= List of schools in the Riverina =

This is a list of schools in the Riverina region of New South Wales, Australia. The New South Wales education system traditionally consists of primary schools, which accommodate students from Kindergarten to Year 6 (ages 5–12), and high schools, which accommodate students from Year 7 to Year 12 (ages 12–18).

== Public schools ==
=== Infants schools (K–2) ===
Name	Suburb	LGA	Opened
Narrandera East Infants School	Narrandera	Narrandera Shire	1960

=== Primary schools (K–6) ===
Name	Suburb	LGA	Opened
Ashmont Public School	Wagga Wagga	City of Wagga Wagga	1966
Binya Public School	Binya	Narrandera Shire	1919
Beckom Publick School	Beckom	Coolamon Shire	1911
Eurongilly Public School	Eurongilly	Junee Shire	1918
Ganmain Public School	Ganmain	Coolamon Shire	1892
Griffith Public School	Griffith	City of Griffith	1920
Griffith East Public School	Griffith	City of Griffith	1960
Griffith North Public School	Griffith	City of Griffith	1953
Hanwood Public School	Hanwood	City of Griffith	1913
Illabo Public School	Illabo	Junee Shire	1884
Junee Public School	Junee	Junee Shire	1880
Kapooka Public School	Kapooka	City of Wagga Wagga	1953
Lake Albert Public School	Lake Albert	City of Wagga Wagga	1868
Leeton Public School	Leeton	Leeton Shire	1912
Marrar Public School	Marrar	Coolamon Shire	1909
Matong Public School	Matong	Coolamon Shire	1899
Narrandera Public School	Narrandera	Narrandera Shire	1873
Parkview Public School	Parkview	Leeton Shire	1971
Red Hill Public School	Tolland	City of Wagga Wagga	1970
Tarcutta Public School	Tarcutta	City of Wagga Wagga	1873
Turvey Park Public School	Turvey Park	City of Wagga Wagga	1953
South Wagga Public School	Wagga Wagga	City of Wagga Wagga	1892
North Wagga Public School	Wagga Wagga	City of Wagga Wagga	1880
Wagga Wagga Public School	Wagga Wagga	City of Wagga Wagga	1861
Wamoon Public School	Wamoon	Leeton Shire	1916
Whitton Murrami Public School	Whitton	Leeton Shire	1884
Yanco Public School	Yanco	Leeton Shire	1909
Yoogali Public School	Yoogali	City of Griffith	1917

=== High schools (7–12) ===
In New South Wales, a high school generally covers Years 7 to 12 in the education system, and a central or community school, intended to provide comprehensive education in a rural district, covers Kindergarten to Year 12. An additional class of high schools has emerged in recent years as a result of amalgamations which have produced multi-campus colleges consisting of Junior and Senior campuses.

While most schools are comprehensive and take in all students of high school age living within its defined school boundaries, some schools are either specialist in a given Key Learning Area, or selective in that they set examinations or other performance criteria for entrance.

Name	Suburb
Albury High School	Albury
Barham High School	Barham
Billabong High School	Culcairn
Coleambally Central School	Coleambally
Cootamundra High School	Cootamundra
Corowa High School	Corowa
Deniliquin High School	Deniliquin
Finley High School	Finley
Hay War Memorial High School	Hay
James Fallon High School	Albury
Junee High School	Junee
Kooringal High School	Kooringal
Mount Austin High School	Mount Austin
Leeton High School	Leeton
Murray High School	Lavington
Murrumbidgee Regional High School	Griffith
Murrumburrah High School	Murrumburrah
Narrandera High School	Narrandera
Temora High School	Temora
Tumbarumba High School	Tumbarumba
Tumut High School	Tumut
Wagga Wagga High School	Wagga Wagga
West Wyalong High School	West Wyalong
Yanco Agricultural High School	Yanco

=== Central schools (K–12) ===
Name	Suburb	LGA	Opened
Ardlethan Central School	Ardlethan	Coolamon Shire	1910
Barellan Central School	Barellan	Narrandera Shire	1911
Coleambally Central School	Coleambally	Murrumbidgee Council	1963

=== Special schools ===
Special schools are public schools designed for children or youth with chronic disabilities or who for other reasons cannot be accommodated in the comprehensive school system.

Name	Suburb	LGA	Opened
The Bidgee School	Turvey Park	City of Wagga Wagga	2006
Gralee School	Gralee	Leeton Shire	1988
Kalinda School	Griffith	City of Griffith	1981
Kandeer School	North Albury	City of Albury	1991
Willans Hill School	Turvey Park	City of Wagga Wagga	1973

=== Defunct primary schools ===
Name	Suburb	LGA	First Opened	Permanently Closed	Notes
Bethungra Public School	Bethungra	Junee Shire	1876	1995	
Calorafield Public School	Calorafield		1929	1987	Also called Yenda Road Provisional School until July 1929. Provisional School from 1929 to 1946 before closing. Reopened as a Provisional School from 1949 to 1957, Public School from 1957 to 1987.
Colando Public School	Colando		1917	1951	
Corbie Hill Public School	Corbie Hill	Leeton Shire	1926	1970	Provisional School from 1926 to 1929 and then a Public School from 1930 to 1970.
Gogeldrie South Public School	Gogeldrie	Leeton Shire	1930	1972	Provisional School from 1930 to 1957. Public school from 1957 to 1972.
Grong Grong Public School	Grong Grong	Narrandera Shire	1883	2013	
Junee Reefs Public School	Junee Reefs	Junee Shire	1884	1944	Provisional School from 1884 to September 1892. Public School from October 1892 to 1941 and then again from April to December 1944.
Merungle Hill Public School	Merungle Hill	Leeton Shire	1927	1974	Provisional School from 1927 to 1929 and then a Public School from 1929 to 1974.
Murrami Public School	Murrami	Leeton Shire	1925	2014	Provisional School from 1925 to 1932 and then a Public School from 1933 to 2015. Merged into Whitton Public School which was renamed Whitton Murrami Public School.
Old Junee Public School	Old Junee	Junee Shire	1880	1967	Called Junee School until 1893. Also known as Jewnee School. Provisional School from 1880 to 1881. Public School from 1881 to 1951 and then again from 1953 to 1967.
Stanbridge Public School	Stanbridge	Leeton Shire	1917	1987	
Stony Point Public School	Stony Point	Leeton Shire	1894	1978	Also called Brobenah School until 1927. Began as a House-To-House School for 1894. Public School from 1895 to 1902. A Half-Time School partnered with Willimbong from 1902 to 1905. Public School again from 1905 to 1906. Returned to the previous Half-Time arrangement from 1910 to 1911 before becoming a Provisional School from 1911 to 1912. A Public School from 1915 to 1978 when the school was closed permanently.
Tarcutta Lower School	Tarcutta	Kyeamba Shire	1873	1943	Half-Time School partnered with Tarcutta Upper (now simply Tarcutta) from 1873 to 1877. Provisional School from 1880 to 1911. Half-Time School partnered with Mundarlo School in January of 1920. Provisional School from 1921 to 1943.
Wantabadgery Public School	Wantabadgery	Coolamon Shire	1879	1971	Half-Time School partnered with Claredon from 1879 to 1880. Provisional School from 1881 to 1884 and then again from 1895 to 1904. Half-Time School partnered with Claredon from March to September 1904. Provisional School again from October 1904 to 1914. Finally a Public School from 1915 to 1971 before closing permanently.
Willimbong School		Yanko Shire	1900	1911	Also called Yanko North until 1903. Provisional School from 1900 to 1901. A Half-Time School partnered with Stony Point from 1902 to 1905 and then again from 1910 to 1911.

=== Defunct high schools ===
Name	Suburb	LGA	Opened	Closed	Notes
Griffith High School	Griffith	City of Griffith	1933	2018	Merged with Wade HS to form Murrumbidgee Regional High School
Wade High School	Griffith	City of Griffith	1971	2018	Merged with Griffith HS to form Murrumbidgee Regional High School

== Private schools ==
Independent or private schools are those schools run by an independent organisation, typically a school board or council.

=== Catholic schools ===
In New South Wales, Catholic primary schools are usually (but not always) linked to a parish. Prior to the 1970s, most schools were founded by religious institutes, but with the decrease in membership of these institutes, together with major reforms inside the church, lay teachers and administrators began to take over the schools, a process completed by approximately 1995. The Catholic Education, Diocese of Wagga Wagga (CEDWW) is responsible for coordinating administration, curriculum and policy across the Catholic school system. Preference for enrolment is given to Catholic students from the parish or local area, although non-Catholic students are admitted if room is available.

==== Catholic primary schools (K–6) ====
Name	Suburb	LGA	Opened
All Saints Primary School	Tumbarumba	Snowy Valleys Council	
St Anne's Primary School	North Albury	City of Albury	
St Brendan's Primary School	Ganmain	Coolamon Shire	
Henschke Primary School Wagga Wagga	Turvey Park	City of Wagga Wagga	
Holy Spirit Primary School	Lavington	City of Albury	
Holy Trinity Primary School	Wagga Wagga	City of Wagga Wagga	
St Joseph's Primary School	Culcairn	Greater Hume Shire	
St Joseph's Primary School	Finley	Berrigan Shire	
St Joseph's Primary School	Junee	Junee Shire	
St Joseph's Primary School	Jerilderie	Murrumbidgee Council	
St Joseph's Primary School	Leeton	Leeton Shire	
St Joseph's Primary School	Lockhart	Lockhart Shire	
St Joseph's Primary School	Narrandera	Narrandera Shire	
St Joseph's Primary School	Wagga Wagga	City of Wagga Wagga	
St Mary's Primary School	Corowa	Federation Council	
St Mary's Primary School	Yoogali	City of Griffith	
Mater Dei Primary School	Wagga Wagga	City of Wagga Wagga	
St Michael's Primary School	Coolamon	Coolamon Shire	
St Patrick's Parish School	Albury	City of Albury	
St Patrick's Primary School	Griffith	City of Griffith	
St Patrick's Primary School	Holbrook	Greater Hume Shire	
St Peter's Primary School	Coleambally	Murrumbidgee Council	
Sacred Heart Primary School	Tocumwal	Berrigan Shire	
Sacred Heart Primary School	Kooringal	City of Wagga Wagga	

==== Catholic high schools ====
Name	Suburb	LGA	Opened
St Francis de Sales Regional College	Gralee	Leeton Shire	1956
Kildare Catholic College	Wagga Wagga	City of Wagga Wagga	2004
Mater Dei Catholic College	Lake Albert	City of Wagga Wagga	2003
St Mary MacKillop College	Jindera	City of Albury	2009
St Mary MacKillop College	Turvey Park	City of Wagga Wagga	
Xavier High School	North Albury	City of Albury	1983

=== Brethren schools (3–12) ===
OneSchool Global operates a number of campuses throughout the Riverina. The school is exclusively for members of the Plymouth Brethren Christian Church and admits students from Year 3 to Year 12.

Campus	Suburb	LGA
Albury	Lavington	City of Albury
Leeton	Parkview	Leeton Shire
Wagga Wagga	Tolland	City of Wagga Wagga

=== Other private schools ===
Name	Suburb	LGA	Opened
Riverina Anglican College	Wagga Wagga	City of Wagga Wagga	1999
Scots School	Albury	City of Albury	1972

=== Special-purpose private schools ===
The Government of New South Wales recognises a registration category known as "Prescribed Non-Government Schools" which serve the same purposes as Special Schools but are privately operated.

Name	Suburb	Opened
Aspect Riverina School	Albury	

== See also ==
- Lists of schools in Australia
- List of schools in New South Wales
