= Irrigation Way =

Road in New South Wales, Australia

Irrigation Way New South Wales
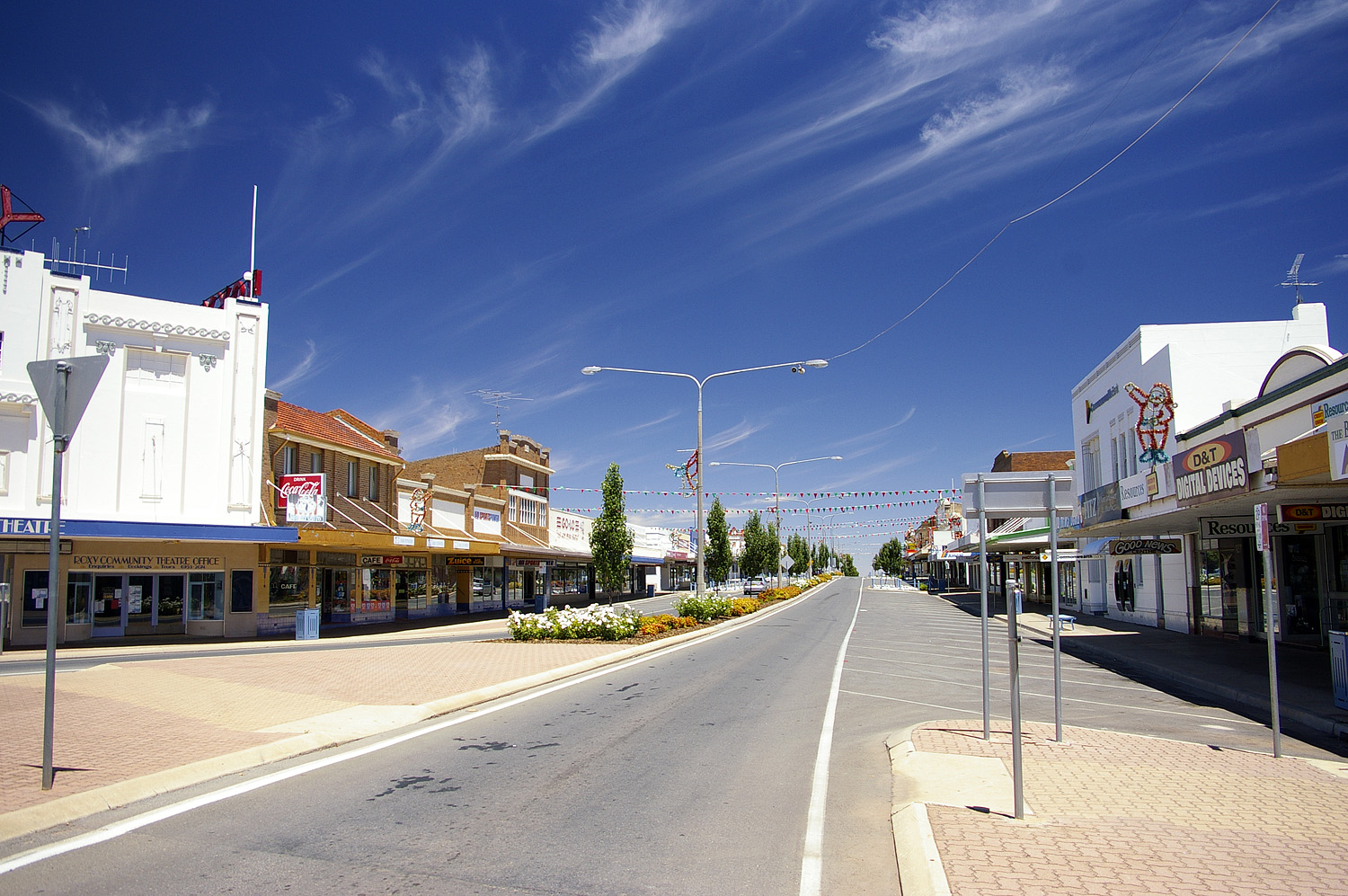
- Leeton's Main Street, part of Irrigation Way

General information
- Type: Rural road
- Length: 84.8 km (53 mi)
- Gazetted: December 1929 (as Main Road 254); March 1938 (as Trunk Road 80)
- Route number(s): B94 (2013–present) (Yoogali–Griffith)
- Former route number: State Route 94 (1974–2013) (Yoogali–Griffith)

Major junctions
- Southeast end: Newell Highway; Narrandera, New South Wales
- Whitton-Darlington Point Road; Burley Griffin Way
- Northwest end: Kidman Way; Griffith, New South Wales

Location(s)
- Major settlements: Leeton, Widgelli

Irrigation Way is a major rural road that runs approximately 85 kilometres (53 mi) through the Murrumbidgee Irrigation Area in south western New South Wales, Australia.

== Route ==
Irrigation Way commences at the intersection with Newell Highway in Narrandera and heads in a north-westerly direction for 29 kilometres (18 mi) before reaching Leeton, continuing another 52 kilometres (32 mi) before ending at the intersection with Kidman Way in Griffith. The road is an important link between the three towns as it is a very productive farming region. Irrigation Way provides a direct route between the national highway network and Griffith. This complements the two state routes that pass through Griffith. The route is most important in linking Leeton to other regions of the state as its only major road.

== History ==
The passing of the Main Roads Act of 1924 through the Parliament of New South Wales provided for the declaration of Main Roads, roads partially funded by the State government through the Main Roads Board (later the Department of Main Roads, and eventually Transport for NSW). With the subsequent passing of the Main Roads (Amendment) Act of 1929 to provide for additional declarations of State Highways and Trunk Roads, Main Road 254 was declared on 5 December 1929, from Griffith via Leeton, Yanco and Narrandera (continuing south to the intersection with Trunk Road 58, later Sturt Highway, at Gillenbah, and north to Hillston).

The Department of Main Roads, which had succeeded the MRB in 1932, declared Trunk Road 80 on 16 March 1938, from Griffith via Leeton to the intersection with State Highway 17 (later Newell Highway), in Narrendera (and continuing westwards via Hillston to Mossgiel), subsuming the alignment of Main Road 254 between Narrandera and Hillston; Main Road 254 was re-declared from Yenda to the intersection with Trunk Road 80 at Wumbulgal as a result.

The passing of the Roads Act of 1993 updated road classifications and the way they could be declared within New South Wales. Under this act, Irrigation Way today retains its declaration as part of Main Road 80, from Narrandera to Griffith.

The route was allocated State Route 94 in 1974 between Yoogali and Griffith. With the conversion to the newer alphanumeric system in 2013, this was replaced with route B94.

== Towns ==
Narrandera: Irrigation Way begins off the Newell Highway near the bridge over the Murrumbidgee River and 2 kilometres (1.2 mi) from the junction with the Sturt Highway. The Narrandera Airport is also located on the Irrigation Way, 10 kilometres (6.2 mi) from Narrandera. Irrigation Way reaches the Shire of Leeton shortly after the airport.

Leeton: Irrigation Way begins in the Leeton Shire between Narrandera Airport and the turn off to Rockdale Beef. After travelling approximately 18 kilometres (11 mi) the small village of Yanco is reached. The Yanco CBD is located on Irrigation Way as Main Street. Leeton is located 3 kilometres (1.9 mi) from Yanco. Leeton's CBD is also found on Irrigation Way. On the southern approach to town there are schools, offices and residential properties before the main streets are reached. On the northern side of town large commercial and industrial properties are found before exiting Leeton. The villages of Wamoon and Whitton are bypassed before entering the City of Griffith Local Government Area.

Griffith: Irrigation Way is short in Griffith. It runs approximately 20 kilometres (12 mi) from Leeton, where it reaches the village of Widgelli before it passes through Yoogali at its junction with Burley Griffin Way, and to eventually end in central Griffith.

== Major intersections ==
LGA	Location	km	mi	Destinations	Notes
Narrandera	Narrandera	0.0	0.0	Newell Highway (A39) – Dubbo, West Wyalong, Jerilderie	Eastern terminus of Irrigation Way, commences as Audley Street
Narrandera	Narrandera	0.9	0.56	Audley Street – Narrandera	
Narrandera	Narrandera	6.3	3.9	Knight Drive – Narrandera Airport	
Leeton	Yanco	22.5	14.0	Euroley Road – Euroley	Irrigation Way continues through Yanco as Main Avenue
Leeton	Leeton	29.3	18.2	Chelmsford Place (Brobendar Road) (northeast) – Barellan; Wade Avenue (southwest) – Leeton	Roundabout; Irrigation Way continues west as Pine Avenue, southeast as Kurrajong Avenue
Leeton	Stanbridge	40.3	25.0	Murrami Road – Murrami, Whitton	
Leeton	Whitton	49.7	30.9	Binyah Street (Whitton-Darlington Point Road) – Whitton, Darlington Point	
Griffith	Widgelli	67.9	42.2	Whitton Stock Route Road – Yenda	
Griffith	Yoogali	81.3	50.5	Burley Griffin Way (B94 northeast) – Yenda, Temora, Bowning; Kurrajong Avenue (southwest) – Hanwood, Darlington Point	Route B94 continues northeast along Burley Griffith Way
Griffith	Griffith	84.8	52.7	Kidman Way (B87) – Darlington Point, Hillston, Cobar	Western terminus of Irrigation Way and route B94 at roundabout, commences as Banna then MacKay Avenues
1.000 mi = 1.609 km; 1.000 km = 0.621 mi: Route transition

== See also ==
- Highways in Australia
- Highways in New South Wales
