= Burley Griffin Way =

Highway in New South Wales, Australia

Burley Griffin Way New South Wales
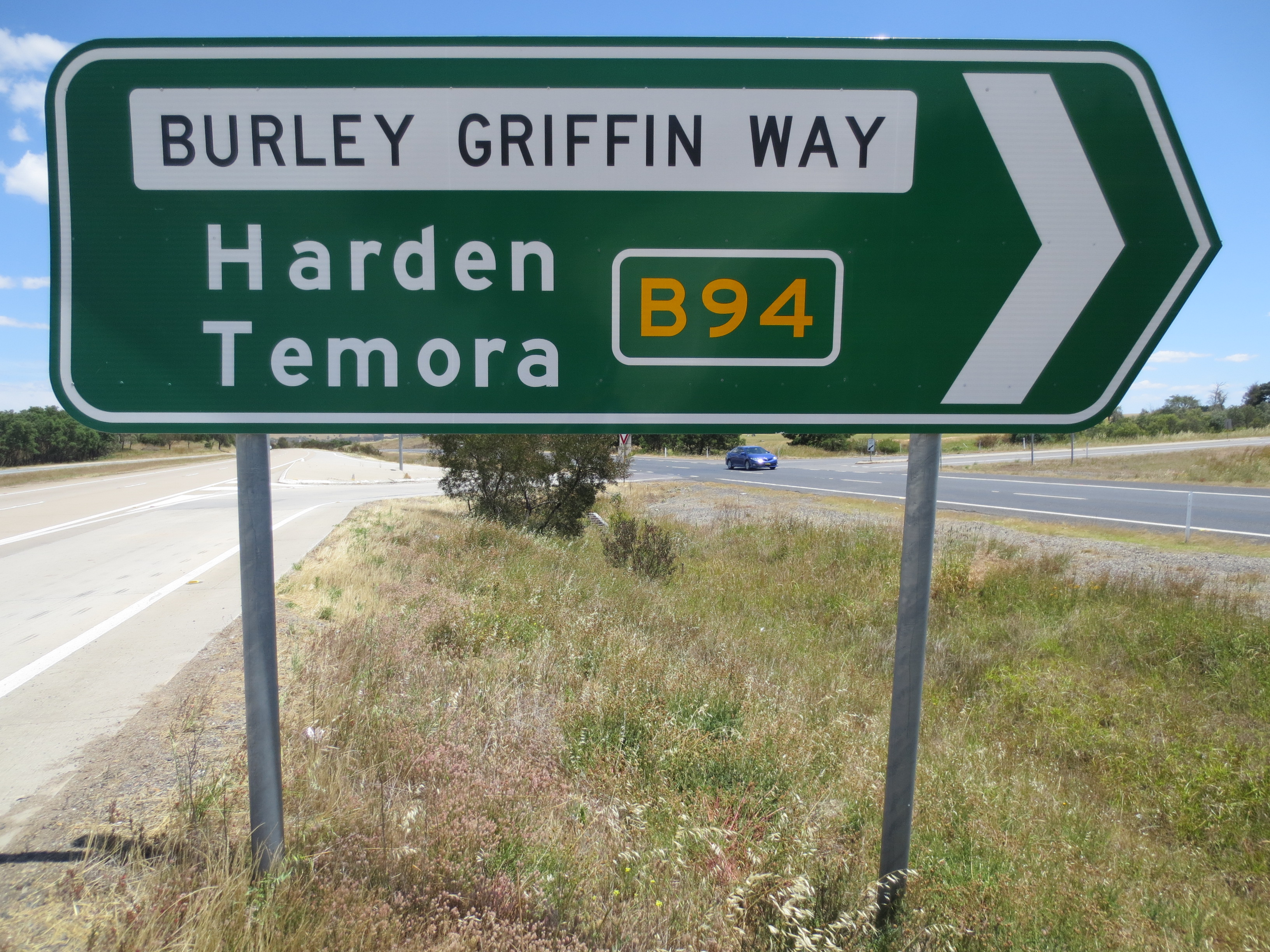
- Burley Griffin Way sign on Hume Highway, at its eastern end
- Coordinates: 34.301716°S 146.083487°E (West end); 34.766327°S 148.762043°E (East end)

General information
- Type: Rural road
- Length: 276 km (171 mi)
- Gazetted: August 1938 (as Main Road 387); August 1949 (as Trunk Road 84)
- Route number(s): B94 (2013–present)
- Former route number: State Route 94 (1974–2013)

Major junctions
- West end: Irrigation Way; Yoogali, New South Wales
- Newell Highway; Goldfields Way; Olympic Highway
- East end: Hume Highway; Bowning, New South Wales

Location(s)
- Major settlements: Yenda, Barellan, Temora, Wallendbeen

Burley Griffin Way is a New South Wales state route, is located in south eastern Australia. Named after the American architect Walter Burley Griffin, designer of the cities of Canberra and Griffith, the road links these two cities via Yass and Barton Highway.

== Route ==
Burley Griffin Way commences at the intersection of Irrigation Way at Yoogali, in the eastern suburbs of Griffith, and heads in an easterly direction, passing through the regional towns of Yenda and Barellan, before meeting Newell Highway at Ardlethan. It recommences at Beckom, running east and crossing Goldfields Way through Temora, Olympic Highway at Wallendbeen, continues through Harden-Murrumburrah and eventually ends at the at-grade interchange with Hume Highway west of Bowning.

Economically it provides a link between the agricultural produce of the western Riverina and Murrumbidgee regions and markets such as Sydney. The area it passes through is one of the richest agricultural areas in Australia. Hence, trucks make up a significant proportion of traffic using the road.

== History ==
The passing of the Main Roads Act of 1924 through the Parliament of New South Wales provided for the declaration of Main Roads, roads partially funded by the State government through the Main Roads Board (MRB). With the subsequent passing of the Main Roads (Amendment) Act of 1929 to provide for additional declarations of State Highways and Trunk Roads, the Department of Main Roads (having succeeded the MRB in 1932) declared Main Road 387 on 24 August 1938, from the intersection with Main Road 254 in Yenda via Barellan to the intersection with State Highway 17 (later Newell Highway) at Ardlethan, then from the intersection from State Highway 17 at Beckom via Temora, Wallendbeen and Harden to the intersection with Hume Highway) in Bowning.

Trunk Road 84 was declared on 24 August 1949, from the intersection with Trunk Road 57 (later Goldfields Way) in Temora via Wallendbeen and Harden to the intersection with Hume Highway) in Bowning, subsuming the alignment of Main Road 387 between Temora and Bowning; Main Road 387 was truncated at Temora as a result.

The passing of the Roads Act of 1993 updated road classifications and the way they could be declared within New South Wales. Under this act, the western end of Main Road 84 (previously Trunk Road 84) was extended to from Temora via Ardlethan, Barellan, Yenda and Yoolgali, subsuming Main Road 387 and a portion of Main Road 254 (which was truncated to meet Main Road 84 at Yenda), and the route was also officially named as Burley Griffith Way, on 2 August 1996. Burley Griffith Way today retains its declaration as Main Road 84.

The route was allocated State Route 94 in 1974. With the conversion to the newer alphanumeric system in 2013, this was replaced with route B94.

In 2007, a bypass was constructed west of Bowning, and Burley Griffin Way was realigned along this road to a new at-grade intersection with Hume Highway. However this intersection can be covered in thick fog in winter, potentially causing accidents for traffic attempting to cross the high-speed dual carriageways of Hume Highway. The area is prone to fog and already had a reputation as a black spot, despite the intersection being opened back in 2007.

=== Wallendbeen Bridge ===
In March 2021, the road over rail bridge at Wallendbeen sustained severe damage from severe weather and had to be dismantled. A temporary single-lane bridge crossing the rail line opened in October 2021. Before this temporary solution was installed, motorists had to take a 40-minute detour. As of 16 December 2024 the temporary bridge has sustained major damage due to a truck accident striking the side of the temporary bridge the 40mins detour is back indefinitely splitting the Burley Griffin way in half again.

Constructing the new Wallendbeen Bridge

Public consultations for the new permanent bridge started in April 2022. The new bridge will feature a 3.9m wide traffic lane and a 2m wide shoulder for each direction, as well as a sefety screen.

During public consultations, the community voiced their need for a pedestrian crossing across the rail line. Construction is progressing with the above-mentioned design, but Transport for NSW is looking into ways to provide this crossing, for example by adding a pedestrian and cyclist crossing to the new bridge when funding and community support is available, or using the infrastructure of the current temporary bridge to create a new, dedicated pedestrian and cyclist bridge.

Construction for the new permanent bridge began in late 2022. From March 2023 onwards, temporary access for plant and equipment was built, and parts were delivered. Pile driving started in late May 2024, and Retaining structures, stormwater drainage, foundations and bridge abutments were constructed from March to August 2024. In September 2024, the bridge girders were lifted into place using a 650t crane.

As of September 2024, Transport for NSW does not expect the bridge to open as planned by mid-2025

As of May 2025 The road approaches are getting built to connect the new bridge to the newly realigned Burley Griffin Way 20 meters west of the temporary bridge.

From Thursday (11 September), traffic heading east and west along Burley Griffin Way will be diverted to a new permanent rail overbridge, signalling the end of the single-lane structure that has served the town and the wider region since the early 1900s.

== Major intersections ==
LGA	Location	km	mi	Destinations	Notes
Griffith	Yoogali	0.0	0.0	Irrigation Way (B94 northwest, unallocated southeast) – Griffith, Leeton, Narrandera	Western terminus of Burley Griffith Way; Route B94 continues northwest along MacKay Ave. Turn left to travel on Irrigation Way. Continues as Kurrajong Avenue
Griffith	Yoogali	0.0	0.0	Kurrajong Avenue (southwest) – Hanwood, Darlington Point	
Griffith	Yenda	16.0	9.9	Whitton Stock Route Road – Widgelli, Leeton	
Coolamon	Ardlethan	80.9	50.3	Newell Highway (A39 south) – Narrandera, Jerilderie	Concurrency with route A39
Coolamon	Beckom	99.2	61.6	Newell Highway (A39 north) – West Wyalong, Dubbo	Concurrency with route A39
Temora	Temora	146.6	91.1	Goldfields Way (B85) – West Wyalong, Old Junee	Roundabout
Temora	Temora	148.6	92.3	Waratah Street, to Milvale Road – Milvale, Young	
Cootamundra-Gundagai	Wallendbeen	207.6	129.0	Main Southern railway line	
Cootamundra-Gundagai	Wallendbeen	208.7	129.7	Olympic Highway (A41) – Albury, Wagga Wagga, Cowra, Bathurst	Roundabout
Hilltops	Murrumburrah	224.2	139.3	Wombat Road – Wombat	
Hilltops	Cunningar	233.3	145.0	Cunningar Road – Boorowa	
Hilltops	Binalong	257.7	160.1	Queen Street, to Hughstonia Road (east) – Boorowa; Stephen Street (north) – Binalong	4-way intersection
Yass Valley	Bowning	276.0	171.5	Hume Highway (M31) – Albury, Yass, Goulburn	Eastern terminus of Burley Griffin Way and route B94; at-grade intersection. Sharp left or turn right to access Hume Highway. No access to 2 Mile Rest Area.
1.000 mi = 1.609 km; 1.000 km = 0.621 mi: Concurrency terminus; Route transition

== See also ==
- Highways in Australia
- List of highways in New South Wales
