= Wattle Hill, New South Wales =

Area of Leeton, New South Wales, Australia

Coordinates: 34°33′S 146°22′E

Wattle Hill
- Suburb
- Country: Australia
- State: New South Wales
- City: Leeton
- LGA: Leeton Shire

Government
  - State electorate: Murray
  - Federal division: Farrer
- County: Cooper
- Parish: Yarangery

Wattle Hill is a north-western suburb of Leeton, New South Wales. Wattle Hill was developed in the 1970s and 1980s as a joint venture between Leeton Shire Council and the New South Wales Department of Housing. Wattle Hill has a large concentration of housing department homes particularly on Gossamer, Wirilda and Blackwood Streets. The rest of the suburb has private residences, a small shopping precinct and three parks, one of which has a large water tower that supplies water to Wattle Hill and Wamoon.

The Geographical Names Board of New South Wales formerly recognised Wattle Hill as a suburb, from 1970 to 1993.

== History ==
During the development of Wattle Hill, it was proposed that a state primary school was to be built in the suburb with land set aside to the west of the suburb, however, the school was built in the nearby suburb of Parkview. Before redevelopment, Wattle Hill was an unofficial low-income housing area for many local families. There were many homes there without floors, constructed from poles, flattened 4-gallon drums and hessian.

A number of young people from the settlement served and died in WW2. During this time, Mrs Gordon, a nearby farm resident and wife of Leeton poet, Jim Gordon ("Jim Grahame") had the only phone in the area, and would often convey messages to the Wattle Hill families of losses of these young people serving.

At the top of the hill was the former site for an open waste metal dump from the Leeton Cannery. This was a play area for local kids, with old "tin lids" from large cans serving as "frisbees". Local farmers would gather the shiny offcuts from the cannery to drape on fruit trees to repel birds. The nearby WCIC channel and branch canal served as the local swimming places for kids from "The Hill" and nearby farms.
