= Stony Point, New South Wales =

Stony Point
- Town
- Coordinates: 34°28′51″S 146°24′55″E
- Country: Australia
- State: New South Wales
- LGA: Leeton Shire
- Location: 9 km (5.6 mi) from Leeton; 10 km (6.2 mi) from Murrami

Government
  - State electorate: Murray
  - Federal division: Farrer
- Postcode: 2705
- County: Caira

Stony Point was a village community in the central part of the Riverina which is now not classified as a place by the Geographical Names Board of New South Wales. It is situated by road, about 9 kilometres north from Leeton and 10 kilometres south from Murrami.
