= Results of the 1941 New South Wales local elections =

1941 New South Wales local elections
- 6 December 1941

These are the results of the 1941 New South Wales local elections which were held across the state on Saturday 6 December 1941.

== Willimbong ==
1941 Willimbong Shire Council election
- 6 December 1941

All 9 seats on Willimbong Shire Council 5 seats needed for a majority
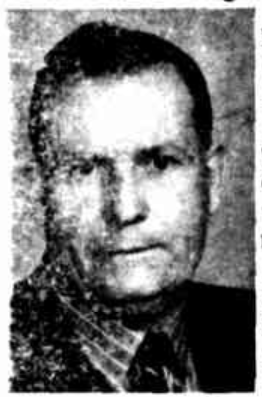
	First party	Second party
	IND
Leader	N/A	Richard Alfred Struck
Party	Independents	Labor
Seats won	6	3
Popular vote	3,702	1,781
Percentage	67.5%	32.5%
Largest party before election
Independents
Largest party after election
Independents

This was the first election held under the new three 3-member-ridings system that increased the size of council by one seat.

The Labor Party ran a full ticket in A Riding which included the incumbent Shire President R. A. Struck and another incumbent councillor in O. J. Washington. The ticket won two of the three seats and returning their incumbent candidates who topped the poll. In B Riding Labor man J. J. O'Donoghue — who was first elected at a 1939 extraordinary election to replace the vacancy left by George Enticknap's departure — was returned to his post at the top of the poll.

A recount was held for C Riding at the request of Herbert Gorey who came in fourth place at a difference of one vote.

=== Willimbong results ===
Riding	Elected councillor	Party
A	Oscar J. "Jack" Washington	Labor
A	Richard Alfred Struck	Labor
A	Michael Joseph Gleeson	Independent
B	John Joseph O'Donoghue	Labor
B	Carey Middleton McClellan	Independent
B	Hector MacPherson Waring	Independent
C	John Sylvester Dooley	Independent
C	William Arbuckle	Independent
C	Arthur Marston	Independent

1941 New South Wales local elections: Willimbong Shire
Party	Votes	%	Swing	Seats	Change
Independents	3,702	67.5		6	▼
Labor	1,781	32.5		3	▲
Total formal votes	5,483	99.8			
Informal votes	12	0.2			
Total ballots	1,856				
Turnout					
Registered voters					

==== A Riding ====
1941 New South Wales local elections: Willimbong (A Riding)
Party	Candidate	Votes	%	±%
Labor	Oscar John "Jack" Washington (elected)	527	23.5	
Labor	Richard Alfred Struck (elected)	525	23.4	
Independent	Michael Joseph Gleeson (elected)	479	21.3	
Independent	Frederick Charles Mountford	353	15.7	
Labor	William Henry Harris	220	9.8	
Independent	Colin Campbell	140	6.2	
Total formal votes		2,244	99.7	
Informal votes		6	0.3	
Total formal ballots		748		
Registered electors				
Turnout				

==== B Riding ====
1941 New South Wales local elections: Willimbong (B Riding)
Party	Candidate	Votes	%	±%
Labor	John Joseph O'Donoghue (elected)	446	21.9	
Independent	Carey Middleton McClellan (elected)	382	18.8	
Independent	Hector MacPherson Waring (elected)	372	18.3	
Independent	Arthur Frederick Thompson	321	15.8	
Independent	William Joseph Lamprell	275	13.5	
Independent	Patrick George Taylor	238	11.7	
Total formal votes		2,034	99.8	
Informal votes		4	0.2	
Total formal ballots		678		
Registered electors				
Turnout				

==== C Riding ====
1941 New South Wales local elections: Willimbong (C Riding)
Party	Candidate	Votes	%	±%
Independent	John Sylvester Dooley (elected)	217	19.0	
Independent	William Arbuckle (elected)	210	18.4	
Independent	Arthur Marston (elected)	196	17.2	
Independent	Herbert John Thomas Gorey	195	17.1	
Independent	James Hubert Marks	178	15.6	
Independent	Samuel James Crozier	146	12.8	
Total formal votes		1,142	99.8	
Informal votes		2	0.2	
Total formal ballots		430		
Registered electors				
Turnout				
