= Corbie Hill, New South Wales =

Locality in New South Wales, Australia

Coordinates: 34°34′S 146°27′E

Corbie Hill is a small locality south-east of Leeton, New South Wales, Australia, in Leeton Shire. It can be accessed by Corbie Hill Road which links to the Irrigation Way at Gralee.

The Leeton Landfill & Recycling Depot is located in Corbie Hill.
