= Results of the 1934 New South Wales local elections =

1934 New South Wales local elections
- 1 December 1934

These are the results of the 1934 New South Wales local elections which were held across the state on Saturday 1 December 1934.

== Willimbong ==
1934 Willimbong Shire Council election
- 1 December 1934

All 8 seats on Willimbong Shire Council 5 seats needed for a majority
	First party	Second party
	IND	IND
Party	Independents	Ind. Labor
Last election	7 seats	1 seat
Seats before	7	1
Seats won	7	1
Seat change	Steady	Steady
Popular vote	1,170	448
Percentage	72.3%	27.7%
Swing	▼21.3	▲18.5 (Note: Based on the 1928 elections as Independent Labor ran only in an uncontested riding in 1934.)
Largest party before election
Independents
Largest party after election
Independents

Elections were held in all ridings except A where the two incumbent councillors were returned unopposed.

Following the election, Cr. Mountford was reëlected Shire President at a margin of 5 votes to 3 over Cr. Enticknap and Cr. Struck was elected Deputy.

=== Willimbong results ===
Riding	Elected councillor	Party
A	F. C. Mountford	Independent
A	Tom J. Ashton	Independent
B	Ambrose George Enticknap	Independent Labor
B	R. A. Struck	Independent
C	John S. Dooley	Independent
C	W. J. Lamprell	Independent
D	T. Darchy	Independent
D	H. L. Tooth	Independent

1934 New South Wales local elections: Willimbong Shire
Party	Votes	%	Swing	Seats	Change
Independents	1,170	72.3	-21.3	7	Steady
Independent Labor	448	27.7	+18.5	1	Steady
Total formal votes	1,618				
Total formal ballots	809				
Informal votes	19				
Turnout					
Registered voters					

==== A Riding ====
1934 New South Wales local elections: Willimbong (Riding A)
Party	Candidate	Votes	%	±%
Independent	F. C. Mountford (elected unopposed)			
Independent	Tom J. Ashton (elected unopposed)			
Total formal votes				
Informal votes				
Registered electors				
Turnout				

==== B Riding ====
1934 New South Wales local elections: Willimbong (Riding B) (Note: Swings based on the 1928 elections as B Riding was uncontested in 1931.)
Party	Candidate	Votes	%	±%
Independent Labor	Ambrose George Enticknap (elected)	329	35.6	+3.3
Independent	R. A. Struck (elected)	291	31.5	−9.6
Independent	M. E. Steen	185	20.0	new
Independent Labor	E. Whybrow	119	12.9	new
Total formal votes		924		
Informal votes				
Registered electors				
Turnout				

==== C Riding ====
1934 New South Wales local elections: Willimbong (Riding C)
Party	Candidate	Votes	%	±%
Independent	John Sylvester Dooley (elected)	151	29.6	−12.2
Independent	W. J. Lamprell (elected)	125	24.5	new
Independent	R. L. Black	61	12.0	new
Independent	L. Jamieson	86	16.9	−11.0
Independent	C. A. McCormack	87	17.1	−13.1
Total formal votes		510		
Informal votes				
Registered electors				
Turnout				

==== D Riding ====
1934 New South Wales local elections: Willimbong (Riding D)
Party	Candidate	Votes	%	±%
Independent	T. Darchy (elected)	79	42.9	+15.9
Independent	H. L. Tooth (elected)	69	37.5	+7.0
Independent	H. G. Lodge	36	19.6	new
Total formal votes		184		
Informal votes				
Registered electors				
Turnout				

== Wyalong ==
1934 Wyalong Municipal Council election
- 1 December 1934

All 9 seats on Wyalong Municipal Council 5 seats needed for a majority
	First party
	IND
Party	Independents
Last election	9 seats
Seats before	9
Seats won	9
Seat change	Steady
Popular vote	964
Percentage	100.0%
Largest party before election
Independents
Largest party after election
Independents

This was the final election held for the Municipality of Wyalong as it was annexed by Bland Shire the next year.

=== Wyalong results ===
1934 New South Wales local elections: (Wyalong)
Party	Candidate	Votes	%	±%
Independent	G. J. Bland	105	10.9	
Independent	P. Curry	105	10.9	
Independent	G. H. Wheeler	104	10.8	
Independent	A. A. Harp	102	10.6	
Independent	M. A. Harp	100	10.4	
Independent	J. T. Wallace	96	10.0	
Independent	J. W. Delaney	96	10.0	
Independent	G. H. Gintrell	88	9.1	
Independent	S. G. Compton	84	8.7	
Independent	J. Smith	84	8.7	
Total formal votes		964		
Informal votes				
Registered electors				
Turnout				
