= Wattle Hill =

Wattle Hill may refer to:

- Wattle Hill, New South Wales
- Wattle Hill, Tasmania
