= Wyalong =

Wyalong New South Wales
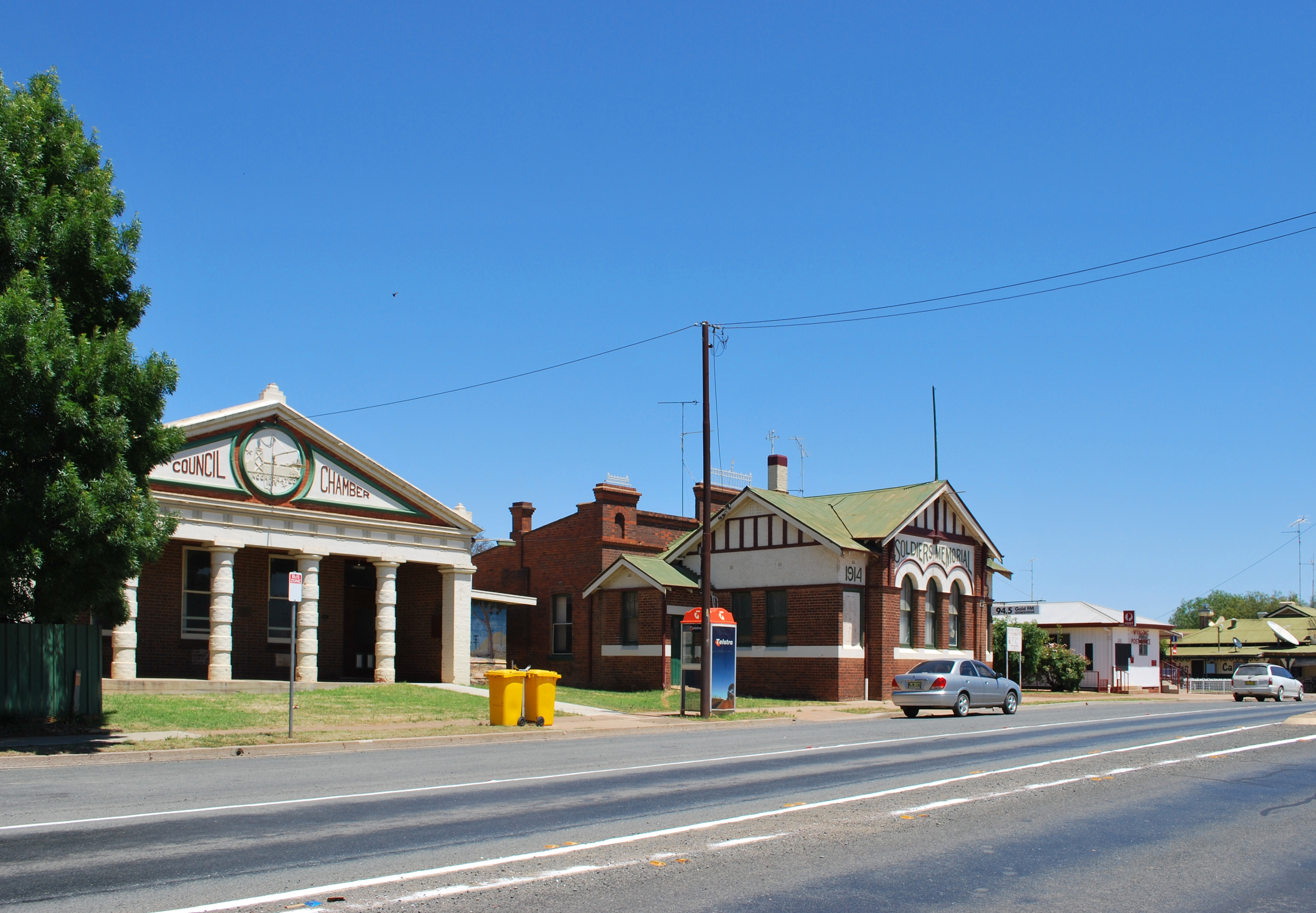
- Neeld St, the main street of Wyalong

- Coordinates: 33°56′S 147°15′E
- Population: 620 (2021 census)
- Postcode(s): 2671
- Elevation: 245 m (804 ft)
- Location: 467 km (290 mi) W of Sydney; 256 km (159 mi) S of Dubbo; 157 km (98 mi) W of Cowra; 167 km (104 mi) NE of Griffith; 5 km (3 mi) E of West Wyalong
- LGA(s): Bland Shire Council
- State electorate(s): Cootamundra
- Federal division(s): Parkes
Mean max temp	Mean min temp	Annual rainfall
23.4 °C; 74 °F	10.0 °C; 50 °F	477.8 mm 18.8 in

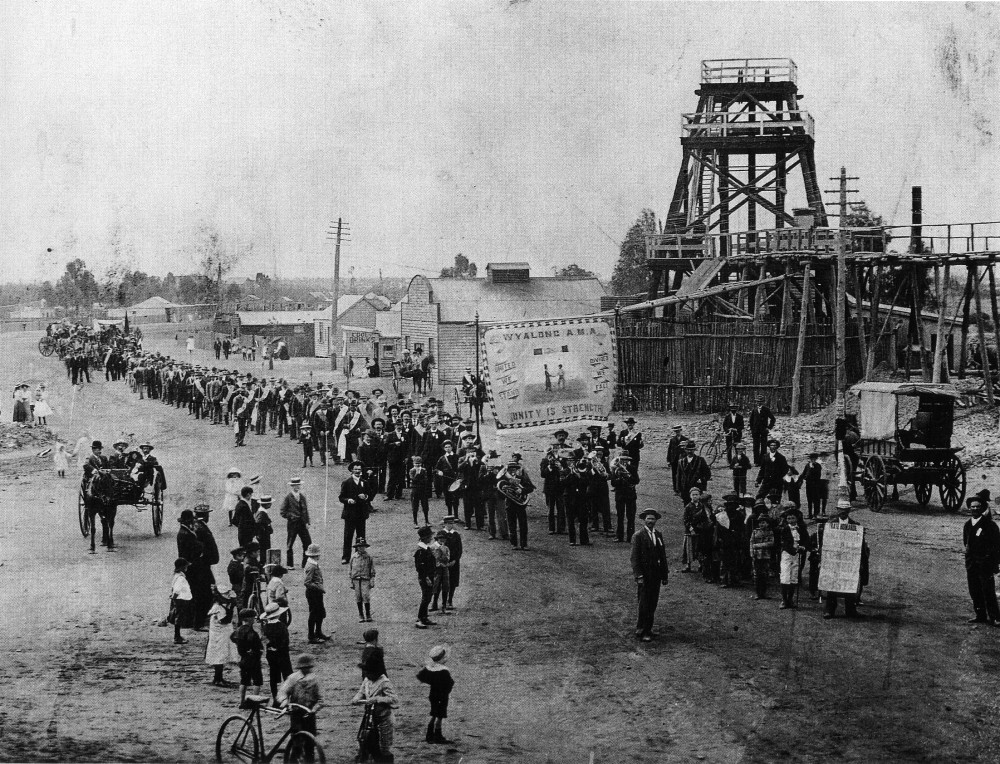
Eight-hour day procession by miners in Wyalong - late 1890s

Wyalong is part of the Bland Shire located in the Northern Riverina Region of New South Wales, Australia. Established as a gold mining town, it is now a quiet town with historic buildings a few kilometres east of West Wyalong, the major district service centre. At the 2021 census, Wyalong had a population of 620.

== History ==
The town of Wyalong was established in 1884.

Gold was discovered at Wyalong in September 1893 by Joseph Neeld. The "Main Camp" was erected on the eastern side of the main diggings with impressive government buildings being erected, now classified by the Heritage Trust as being worthy of preservation. The goldfield was named Wyalong by mining warden William Henry John Slee. At its peak in May 1894 there were more than 12,000 miners on the goldfields, digging deep vertical shafts and tunnels to access the quartz reefs which contained the gold. By the end of 1894 the number of miners had reduced to about 4,200. The Amalgamated Miners' Association of Australasia, a precursor of the Construction Forestry Mining and Energy Union, was active in the area, including organising eight-hour day processions (see Photo).

The Catholic Sisters of Mercy started their first school at St. Patrick's, Wyalong, in 1896 with 196 students and 6 Sisters. In 1899 Wyalong became a municipality with council chambers being erected, a courthouse, police station, post office and school of arts.

Homes and businesses were initially built around the main mining area. In 1895 West Wyalong was developed around the bullock track further west. As mining declined West Wyalong became the main service centre for agriculture in the surrounding district, although for many years there was rivalry between the towns. Both towns wanted the Temora railway line, constructed in 1903, but settled on a compromise of a station midway between the two towns, called Wyalong Central.

Gold mining in the immediate area declined from 1910 and ceased by 1921. Old tailings were reworked by cyanide processing during the 1930s. In 2004 Barrick Gold is undertaking gold mining 43 km west at Lake Cowal through the process of in situ cyanide leaching, a variant of the controversial process of Gold cyanidation.

Development since the 1970s has expanded Wyalong in the direction of West Wyalong with several motels built at Central Wyalong. A shared bicycle and pedestrian track was constructed in 1994 to link Wyalong with West Wyalong.

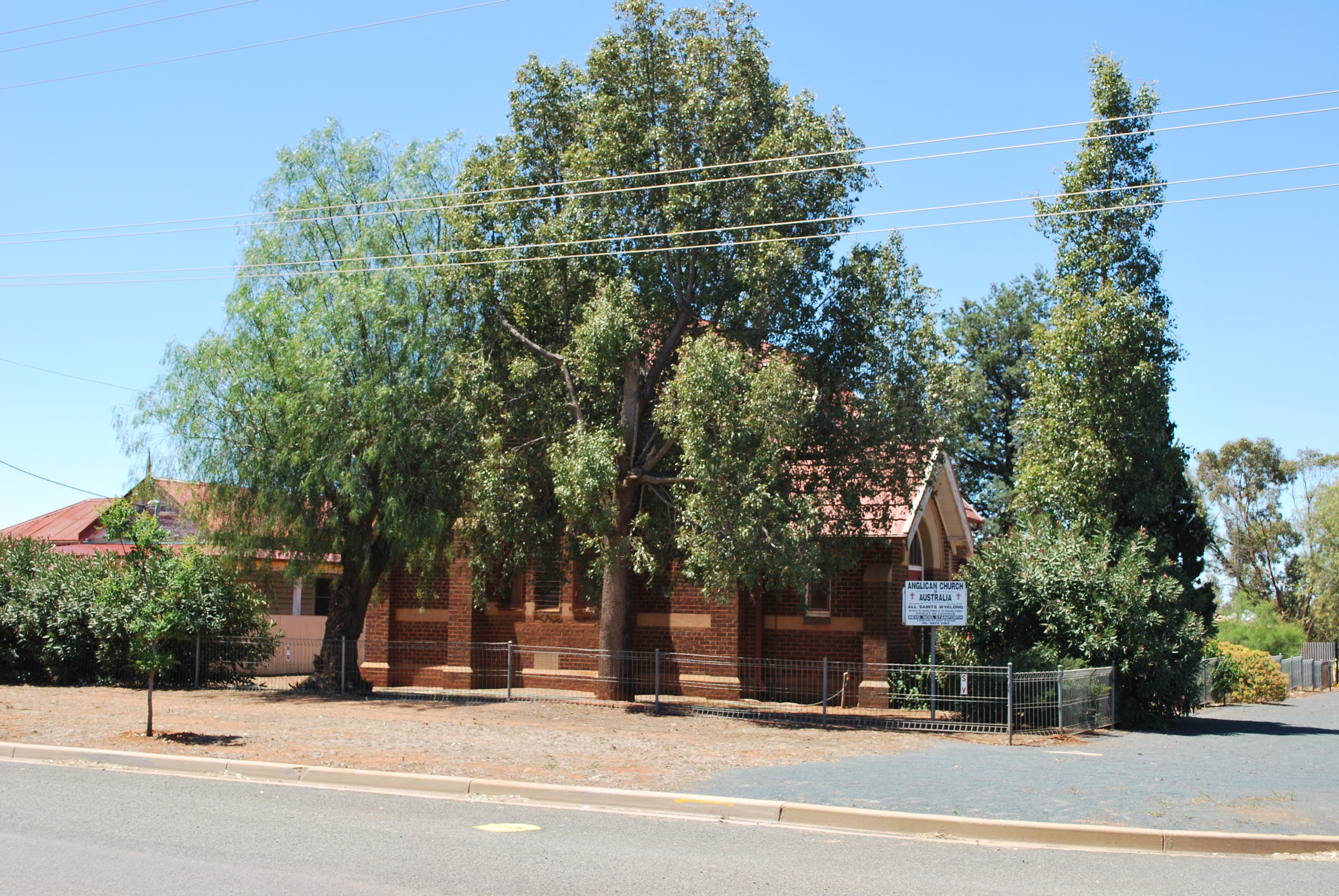
Wyalong Anglican Church
