= Willimbong, New South Wales =

Coordinates: 34°33′S 146°23′E

Willimbong Leeton, New South Wales
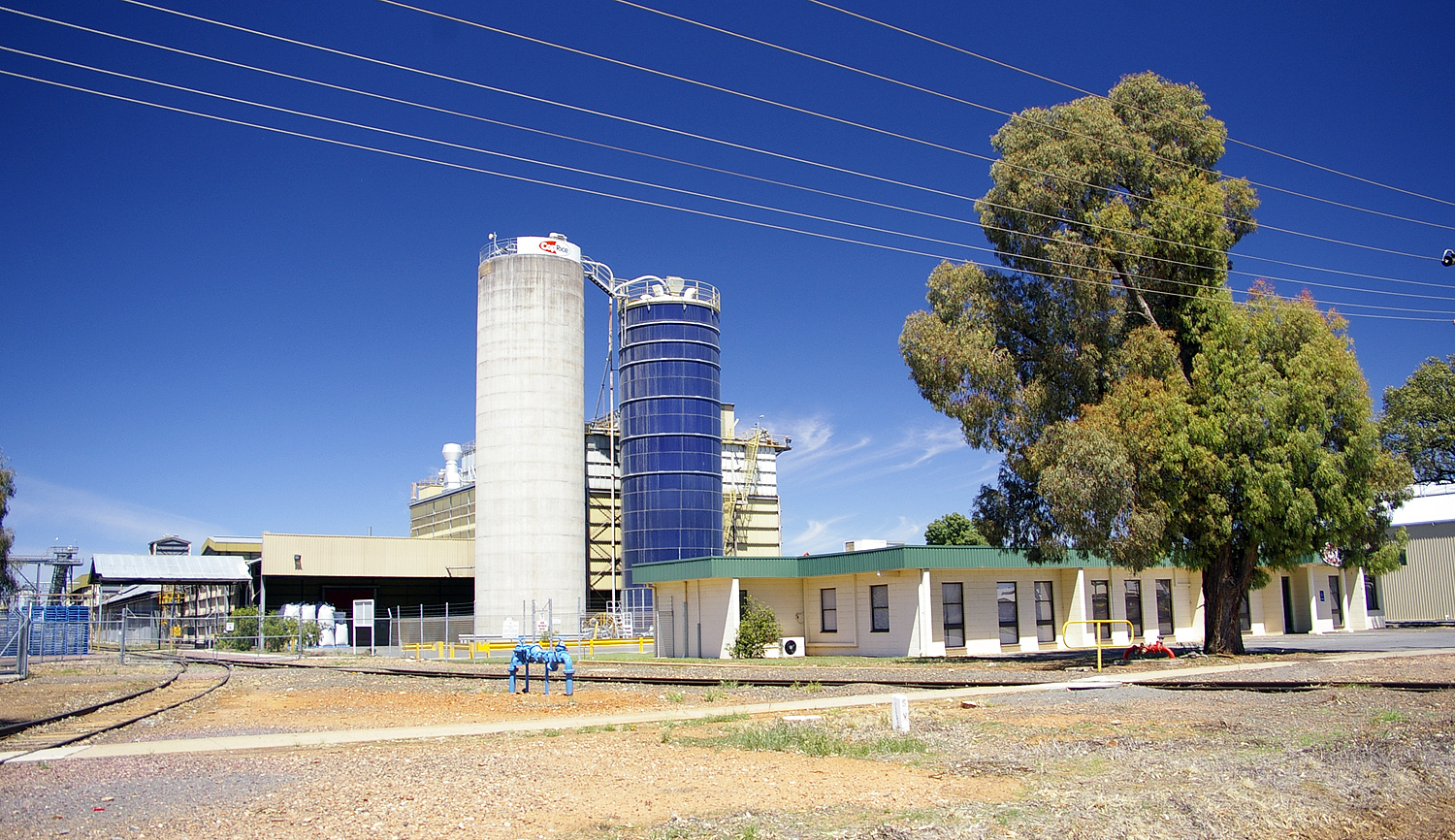
- CopRice Mill
- LGA(s): Leeton Shire
- County: Cooper
- Parish: Yarangery
- State electorate(s): Murray
- Federal division(s): Farrer

Willimbong is a suburb of Leeton, New South Wales, Australia in Leeton Shire. Willimbong has a mix of industrial and residential properties. Leeton's SunRice and Coprice Mills are located in Willimbong as well as the Berri Juice Factory, MIA Rural Services, Cummins and the Country Energy Field Service Centre. Willimbong is also home to a large park known as Waipukurau Park, a corner store and Leeton Pre-School and Leeton Day Care Centre. Residential Streets in Willimbong include, Russet Street, Seville Street, Valencia Street and Elberta Street.

The Geographical Names Board of New South Wales no longer recognises Willimbong as a suburb.
