= Wiradjuri, New South Wales =

Neighbourhood of Leeton, New South Wales, Australia

Coordinates: 34°32′S 146°23′E

Wiradjuri is a subdivision in the rapidly growing Northern area of Leeton, New South Wales in Leeton Shire. Wiradjuri was developed in the 1980s and 90s to cope with Leeton's housing shortage and population boom. The Leeton High School sporting ovals are located to the east.

The Geographical Names Board of New South Wales no longer recognises Wiradjuri as a suburb.
