= Gogeldrie Weir =

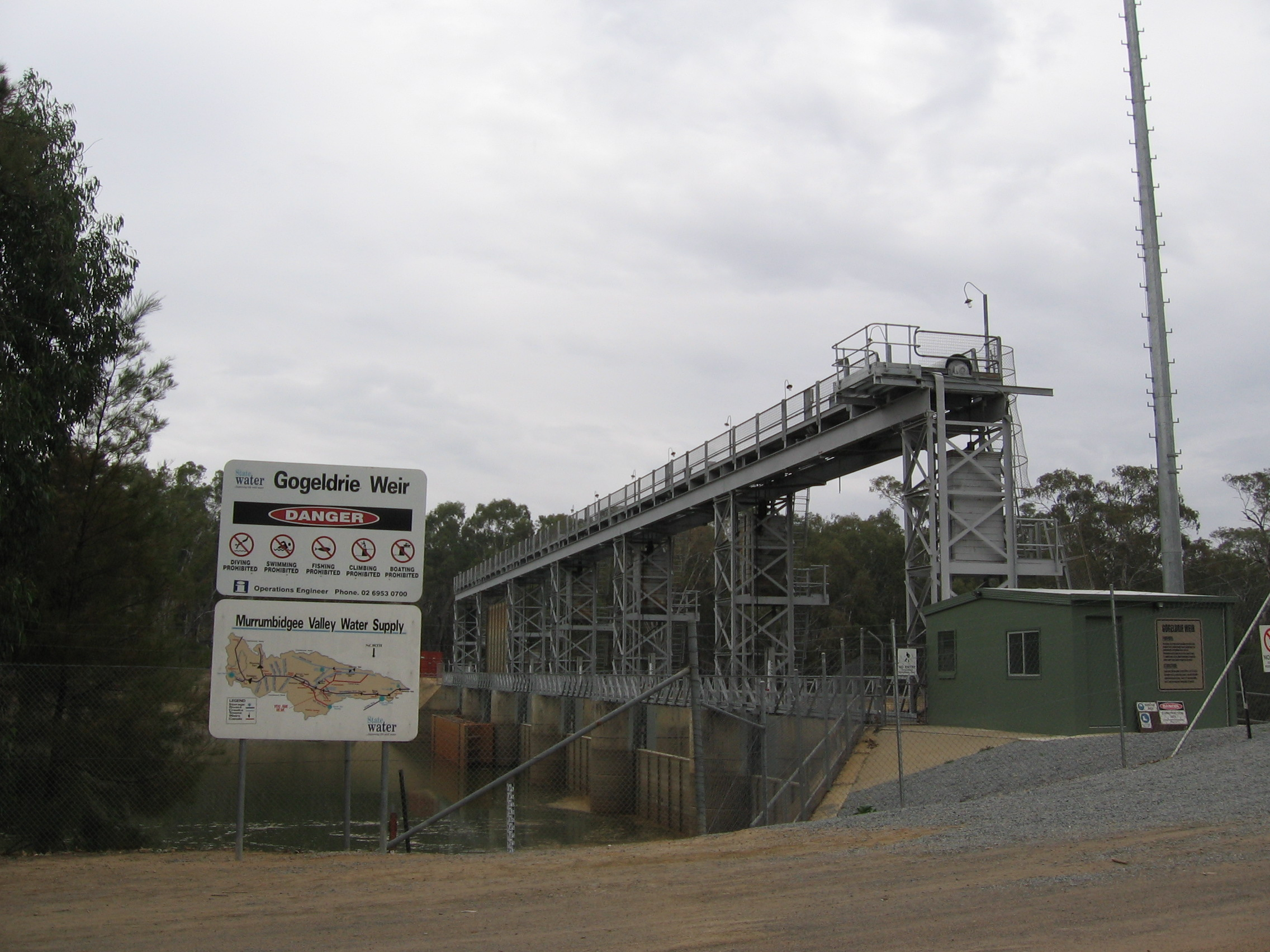

- Location within New South Wales Location within Australia
- 34°36′45″S 146°15′34″E
- Location: Murrumbidgee River, near Narrandera, Leeton Shire, New South Wales, Australia

History
- Built: 1958–1959

Site notes
- Architect(s): WC & IC

New South Wales Heritage Register
- Official name: Gogeldrie Weir
- Type: State heritage (built)
- Designated: 2 April 1999
- Reference no.: 961
- Type: Weir
- Category: Utilities – Water
- Builders: WC & IC

The Gogeldrie Weir is a heritage-listed weir and recreation area on the Murrumbidgee River near Narrandera, in the Riverina region of New South Wales, Australia. It was designed and built by WC & IC from 1958 to 1959. It was added to the New South Wales State Heritage Register on 2 April 1999.

== History ==
The Gogeldrie Weir was completed in 1959 to divert water from the Murrumbidgee River to the Coleambally Irrigation Area via the Coleambally Canal, and to part of the Murrumbidgee Irrigation Areas and associated irrigation districts via the Stuart Canal. The Coleambally Irrigation Scheme was one of the last major schemes into public irrigation by the government to enable agriculture to expand in the Coleambally south of the Murrumbidgee. The scheme utilised the regulated flows from the Snowy Scheme and the Blowering Dam. The mechanics of Coleambally were similar to the MIA, with a major diversionary weir at Gogeldrie on the Murrumbidgee distributing water by gravity through networks of canals and channels. The first farms were taken up in 1960.

== Description ==
The Gogeldrie Weir is one of seven major weirs on the Murrumbidgee River. It is approximately 63 kilometres (39 mi) downstream of Narrandera. The weir is 85.34 metres (280 ft) between abutments. The weir structure comprises concrete sill floor reinforced with steel sheet piling cut-off walls, the floor is surmounted by concrete piers and steel superstructure providing supports for the steel sluice gates. There are six gates each measuring 6.1 metres (20 ft) high and 12.2 metres (40 ft) wide, weighing 24 tonnes (24 long tons; 26 short tons). The gates are opened individually by electric motors placed centrally between piers. The gates move vertically and the counterweights drop into the counterweight wells allowed for in each of the concrete piers. The original gate control meter has been replaced by computerised meter in 1996. The weir provides a pool level suitable for the diversion of water from the Murrumbidgee River into Coleambally Canal supplying the Coleambally Irrigation Area, and via Coononcoocabil Lagoon into the Stuart Canal to supply part of the Murrumbidgee Irrigation Areas and associated irrigation districts. At full supply level, the weir holds 7,400 megalitres (260×10^{6} cu ft). The effective capacity of both canals for long term operation at about 5,500 megalitres (190×10^{6} cu ft) per day.

== Heritage listing ==
As at 6 December 2000, Gogeldrie Weir is associated with the Coleambally Irrigation Area and also part of the Murrumbidgee Irrigation Area. It is a major component in the Coleambally Irrigation Scheme being the diversion weir that controls and diverts water from the Murrumbidgee River to the Coleambally area. The weir is a landmark in the region.

Gogeldrie Weir was listed on the New South Wales State Heritage Register on 2 April 1999.
