= Merungle Hill, New South Wales =

Merungle Hill New South Wales
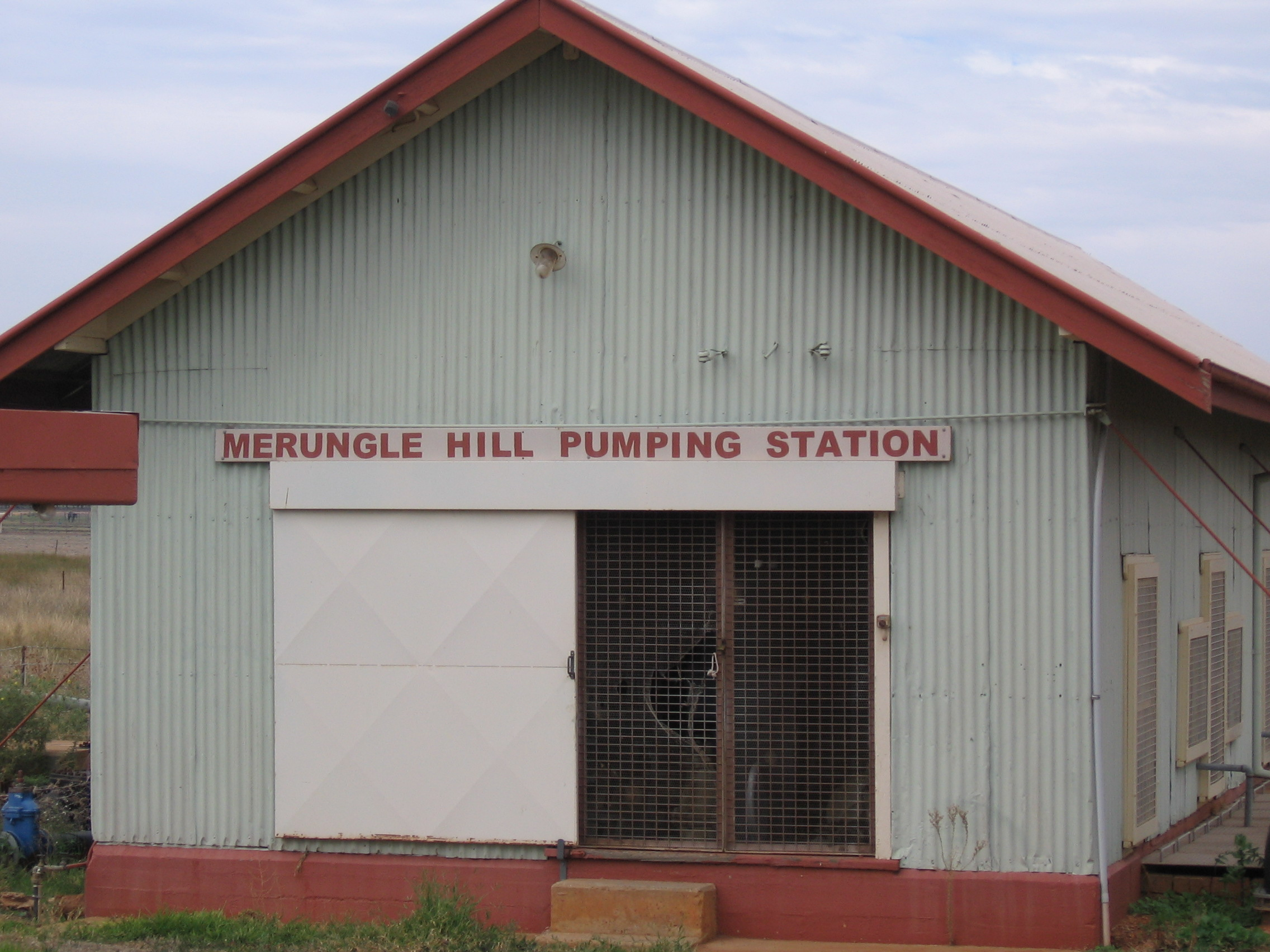
- Irrigation pumping station

- Coordinates: 34°36′S 146°26′E
- Population: 258 (2021 census)
- Postcode(s): 2705
- Location: 3 km (2 mi) from Yanco; 5 km (3 mi) from Leeton
- LGA(s): Leeton Shire
- County: Cooper
- State electorate(s): Murray
- Federal division(s): Farrer

Merungle Hill is a village community in the central north part of the Riverina. It is situated by road, about 3 kilometres north of Yanco and 5 kilometres south east of Leeton. At the 2021 census, Merungle Hill had a population of 258 people.
