= Deniliquin High School =

Location
- Harfleur Street, Deniliquin, Riverina, New South Wales; Australia; 35°32′11″S 144°57′41″E

Information
- Type: Government-funded co-educational comprehensive secondary day school
- Motto: Face the task
- School district: Deniliquin; Rural South and West
- Educational authority: NSW Department of Education
- Principal: Glen Warren
- Teaching staff: 48.6 FTE (2018)
- Years: 7–12
- Enrolment: 432 (2025)
- Slogan: Respect, Responsibility, Co-operation
- Website: deniliquin-h.schools.nsw.gov.au

Deniliquin High School is a government-funded co-educational comprehensive secondary day school, located in Deniliquin, a rural town in the Riverina region of New South Wales, Australia. The school delivers comprehensive education for students from Year 7 to Year 12 and serves as a key learning centre for the wider district community.

The school currently enrols approximately 432 students in 2025, from Year 7 to Year 12, of whom ten percent identified as Indigenous Australians and three percent were from a language background other than English. The school is operated by the NSW Department of Education.

This school's strategic directions are oriented towards quality teaching, by developing a teaching and learning culture towards students; leadership engagement, by consolidating the leadership capacity of students and teachers; and positive relationship, creating positive relationship between the school and the stakeholders.

The school was extensively damaged by fire in November 2025. The fire, one of the most significant incidents in the town’s history, required a large emergency response involving Fire and Rescue NSW, local Rural Fire Service crews, and multiple support agencies. Several core school facilities, including learning spaces, technology resources, and administrative areas, were destroyed or made unusable, causing major disruption to daily operations. There were no serious injuries, and the evacuation procedures implemented by staff ensured all students were safely accounted for. In the weeks that followed, the Deniliquin community, local businesses, and youth support organisations coordinated fundraising, trauma-informed support services, and temporary learning solutions while rebuilding plans were developed. Clean-up operations began immediately under hazardous site conditions, and by early 2026, redevelopment planning entered its next phase, prioritising modernised fire-safe infrastructure, restoration of specialist classrooms, and long-term continuity of education for students. The event demonstrated the resilience of the school and the strength of support from stakeholders across the Riverina region, as recovery efforts continued throughout 2025 and into 2026, shaping a renewed focus on school safety, community cohesion, and future rebuilding goals. Two teenage boys, aged 15 and 16, were subsequently arrested and charged with aggravated break-and-enter and destruction of property by fire.

In 2023, multiple Deniliquin High School students were selected for the Riverina Murray AFL Football Team, a combined regional representative squad competing at the state level. Students Chase Bartlett, Angus Lawson, and Baxter Cowley contributed to the team’s championship success in the AFL NSW/ACT Under‑15 Boys State Championship, where the Riverina Murray side finished as state premiers. Their selection and victory highlighted the school’s strong contribution to regional Australian rules football pathways and marked a notable achievement for local talent progressing into higher levels of the sport.

== See also ==
- List of government schools in New South Wales: A–F
- List of schools in the Riverina
- Education in Australia
