= Mount Austin High School =

Location
- Wagga Wagga, Riverina, New South Wales; Australia; 35°08′32″S 147°21′15″E

Information
- Type: Government-funded co-educational comprehensive secondary day school
- Motto: By hand and mind
- Established: 1964; 62 years ago
- School district: Wagga Wagga; Rural South and West
- Educational authority: NSW Department of Education
- Acting principal: Michelle Wuagh
- Teaching staff: 50.7 FTE (2018)
- Years: 7–12
- Enrolment: 429 (2018)
- Campus type: Regional
- Colours: Green and gold
- Rival: Wagga Wagga High School
- Website: mtaustin-h.schools.nsw.gov.au

Mount Austin High School is a government-funded co-educational comprehensive secondary day school, located in Wagga Wagga, in the Riverina region of New South Wales, Australia.

Established in 1964, the school enrolled approximately 429 students in 2018, from Year 7 to Year 12, of whom 45 percent identified as Indigenous Australians and 8 percent were from a language background other than English. The school is operated by the NSW Department of Education; and the acting principal is Michelle Waugh.

== Notable alumni ==
- Adam Mullavey, detector controls engineer at the Laser Interferometer Gravitational-Wave Observatory, involved in the first observation of gravitational waves.
- Mark Taylor, cricketer
- Cameron Mooney, AFL player

== See also ==
- List of government schools in New South Wales: G–P
- List of schools in the Riverina
- Education in Australia
