= Widgelli, New South Wales =

Widgelli New South Wales
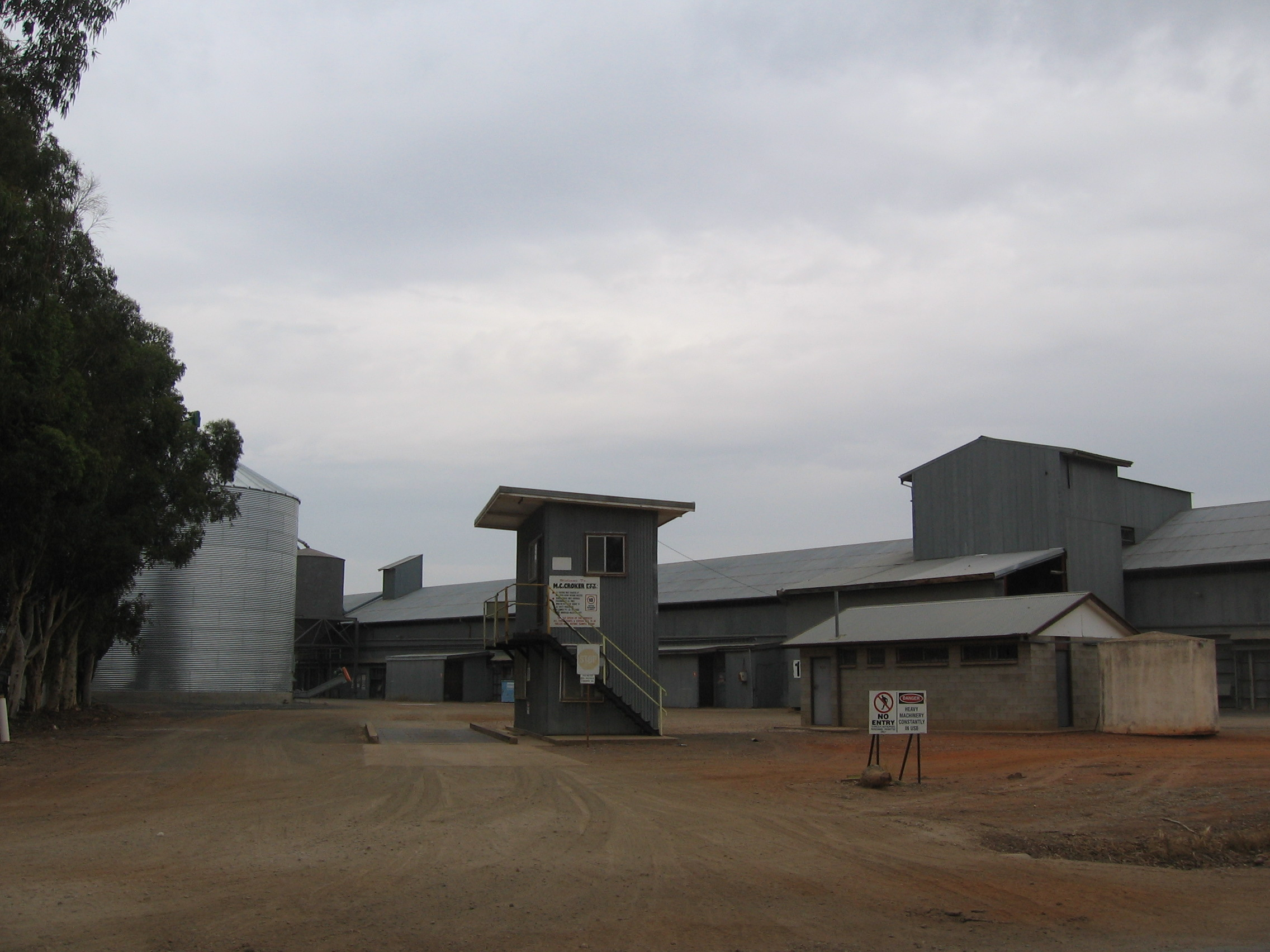
- Silos at Widgelli

- Coordinates: 34°29′S 146°08′E
- Population: 91 (SAL 2021)
- LGA(s): City of Griffith
- County: Cooper
- State electorate(s): Murray
- Federal division(s): Farrer

Widgelli is a small village located in the local government area of the City of Griffith in the Australian state of New South Wales.

Widgelli Post Office opened on 26 October 1953 and closed in 1977.

Preceding station	Former services	Following station
Yoogali towards Griffith	Griffith–Yanco Line	Colchester towards Yanco
