= Gralee, New South Wales =

Coordinates: 34°34′S 146°25′E

Gralee New South Wales
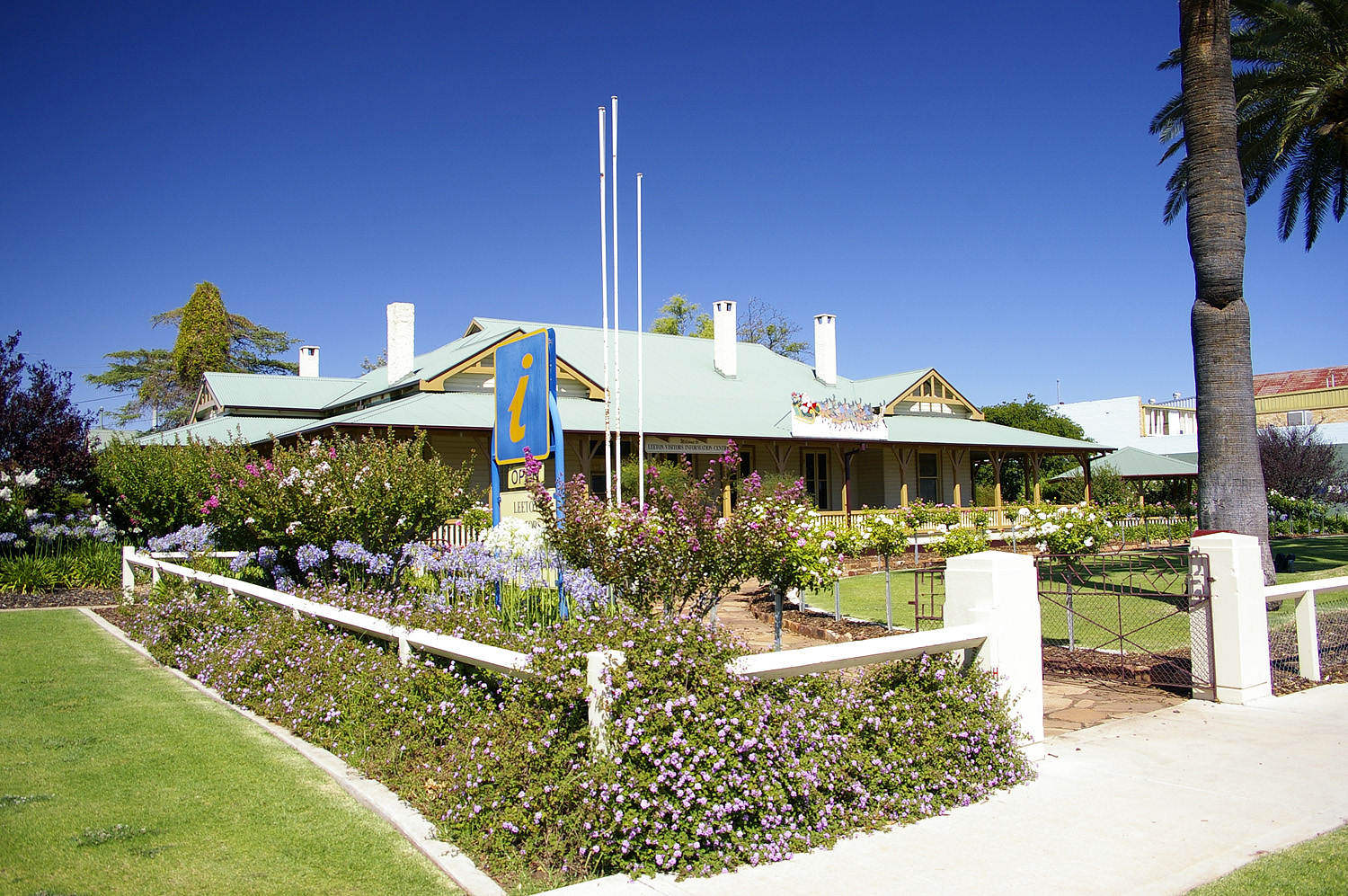
- Leeton Visitors Information Centre.
- LGA(s): Leeton Shire
- County: Cooper
- Parish: Yarangery
- State electorate(s): Murray
- Federal division(s): Riverina

Gralee is a suburb of Leeton, New South Wales in Leeton Shire. Gralee facilities include:

- St Francis De Sales Regional College
- Gralee Special School
- Ricegrowers Co-operative Limited Headquarters
- Leeton Caravan Park
- Leeton Soldiers Club
- Riverina Motel
- Heritage Motor Inn
- Leeton Visitors Information Centre
- Leeton Coach Terminal
- Lutheran Church
- Scout Hall
- Grahame Park
- Leeton Golf Course
- Leeton Veterinary Hospital
- Gralee Store

Gralee (Gra + Lee) was named after Leeton poet, "Jim Grahame" (J. W. Gordon), as was Grahame Park.

The Geographical Names Board of New South Wales no longer recognises Gralee as a suburb.
