= Parkview, New South Wales =

Area of Leeton, New South Wales, Australia

Coordinates: 34°34′S 146°24′E

Parkview Leeton, New South Wales
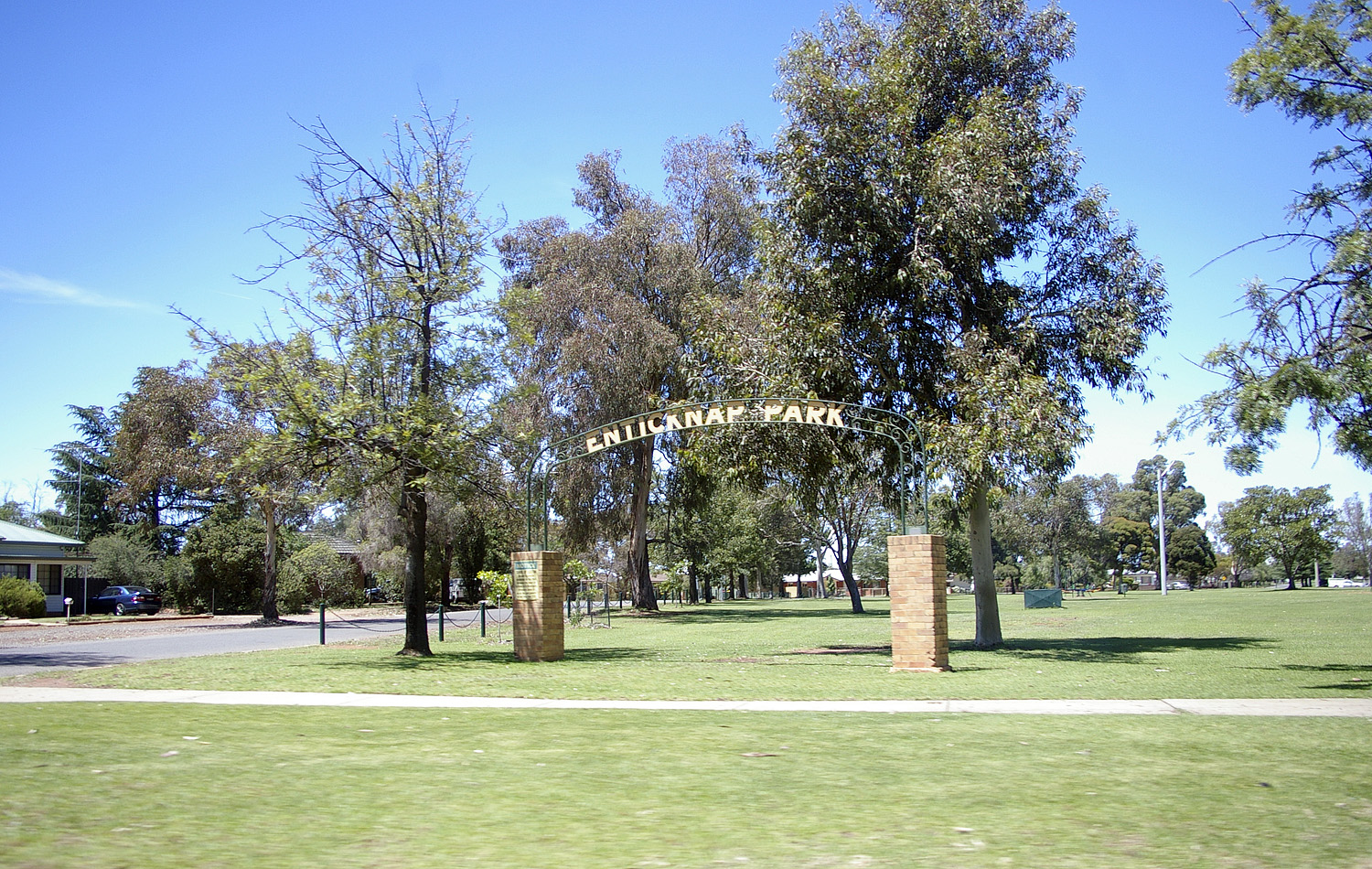
- Enticknap Park in Parkview.
- LGA(s): Leeton Shire
- County: Cooper
- Parish: Yarangery
- State electorate(s): Murray
- Federal division(s): Farrer

Parkview is a residential suburb of Leeton, New South Wales in Leeton Shire. Parkview is located to the south west of town, and can be accessed via the Oak Street Bridge. Parkview is home to Leeton's second state school, Parkview Public School, a takeaway food shop and butcher, two churches, and an array of sporting facilities such as tennis and basketball courts. Leeton's showground, racecourse and the MIA Sports Club are located to the east of the suburb across the railway track.

The Geographical Names Board of New South Wales formerly recognised Parkview as a suburb, from 1970 to 1993.
