= Municipality of Wyalong =

Municipality of Wyalong New South Wales
- Coordinates: 33°56′S 147°15′E
- Established: 2 December 1899
- Abolished: 1 October 1935
- Council seat: Wyalong
- Region: Riverina
- State electorate(s): Lachlan

The Municipality of Wyalong was a local government area of New South Wales centred around the town of Wyalong. It existed for 36 years from 1899 to 1935 when it was absorbed into Bland Shire.

== Council ==
Wyalong Municipal Council

Type
- Type: Unicameral

History
- Founded: 2 December 1899
- Disbanded: 1 October 1935
- Succeeded by: Bland Shire Council

Leadership
- Mayors: List: Jeremiah Moriarty; Ald. Sully; Dr. F. C. S. Shaw; G. J. Bland
- Deputy Mayors: List: P. H. Curry

Structure
- Seats: 9
- Length of term: 3 years (renewable)
- Council Clerks: List: J. Smethurst; V. G. Manning

Elections
- First election: 1900
- Last election: 1934

Meeting place
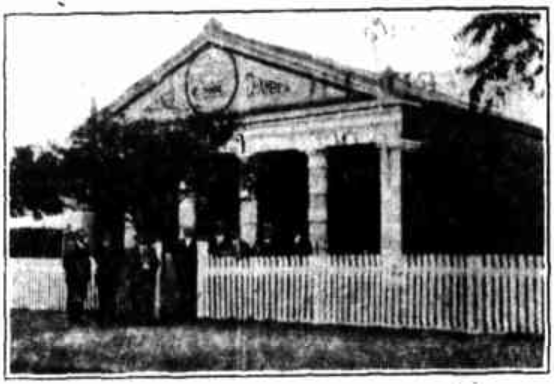
- Wyalong Municipal Chambers; 66 Newell Highway, Wyalong; New South Wales

=== First Council ===
The first Wyalong Municipal Council was elected on the 3rd of March 1900 and met for the first time two days later to elect a mayor on Thursday the 5th of March 1900. The council privately elected Jeremiah Moriarty.

The first meeting of council was held at the Wyalong Courthouse. Mr. J. Smethurst, who was the returning officer for the election and the one who called the meeting, was appointed temporary Council Clerk and the newly elected Mayor was given the responsibility of exploring a suitable building for council business to take place in.

First Council
Alderman	Party	Notes
Jeremiah Moriarty	Unaligned	Mayor
George Davis	Unaligned	
Ernest A. Neeld	Unaligned	
William T. James	Unaligned	
Edward E. Tyler	Unaligned	
G. S. Duncan	Unaligned	
James McDonell	Unaligned	
Edward J. Pike	Unaligned	
James Hodge	Unaligned	

=== Third Council ===
The third council was elected in 1906. The Mayor was Alderman Sully. The Council Clerk was Mr. V. G. Manning who received a salary of £13.

Third Council
Alderman	Party	Notes
Ald. Sully	Unaligned	Mayor
Ald. Channon	Unaligned	
Ald. Butler	Unaligned	
Ald. Aiken	Unaligned	
Ald. Campbell	Unaligned	
Ald. Moody	Unaligned	
Ald. Brookman	Unaligned	
	Unaligned	
	Unaligned	

=== Final Council ===
The final Wyalong Municipal Council was elected in 1934 and served for exactly 10 months, being elected on the 1st of December 1934 and being abolished on the 1st of October 1935.

The Mayor was G. J. Bland who went on to serve as Wyalong's only representation on the Provisional Council that governed the new amalgamated shire for 6 months until an election was held. Alderman P. H. Curry served as Deputy Mayor.

Alderman Compton who was elected last tied with the only excluded candidate in the poll at 84 votes each but was the one elected after a draw.

The council held its final meeting on Thursday, the 26th of September 1935. All aldermen, excepting M. Hart, as well as the Town Clerk, Mr. S. N. Drew, were in attendance. Additionally, the Bland Shire Clerk, Mr. S. M. Smith, was present at the meeting to make some suggestions to the council in regards to the merger and relief work and services associated with it before the council was dissolved and the provisional council took over.

Final Council
Alderman	Party	Notes
G. J. Bland	Unaligned	Mayor
P. H. Curry	Unaligned	Deputy Mayor
G. H. Wheeler	Unaligned	
A. A. Hart	Unaligned	
M. A. Hart	Unaligned	
J. T. Wallace	Unaligned	
J. W. Delaney	Unaligned	
G. A. Grintell	Unaligned	
S. G. Compton	Unaligned	

== Election results ==
=== 1934 ===
1931 New South Wales local elections: (Wyalong)
Party	Candidate	Votes	%	±%
Independent	G. J. Bland	105	10.9	
Independent	P. Curry	105	10.9	
Independent	G. H. Wheeler	104	10.8	
Independent	A. A. Harp	102	10.6	
Independent	M. A. Harp	100	10.4	
Independent	J. T. Wallace	96	10.0	
Independent	J. W. Delaney	96	10.0	
Independent	G. H. Gintrell	88	9.1	
Independent	S. G. Compton	84	8.7	
Independent	J. Smith	84	8.7	
Total formal votes		964		
Informal votes				
Registered electors				
Turnout				
