= Wamoon =

Wamoon New South Wales
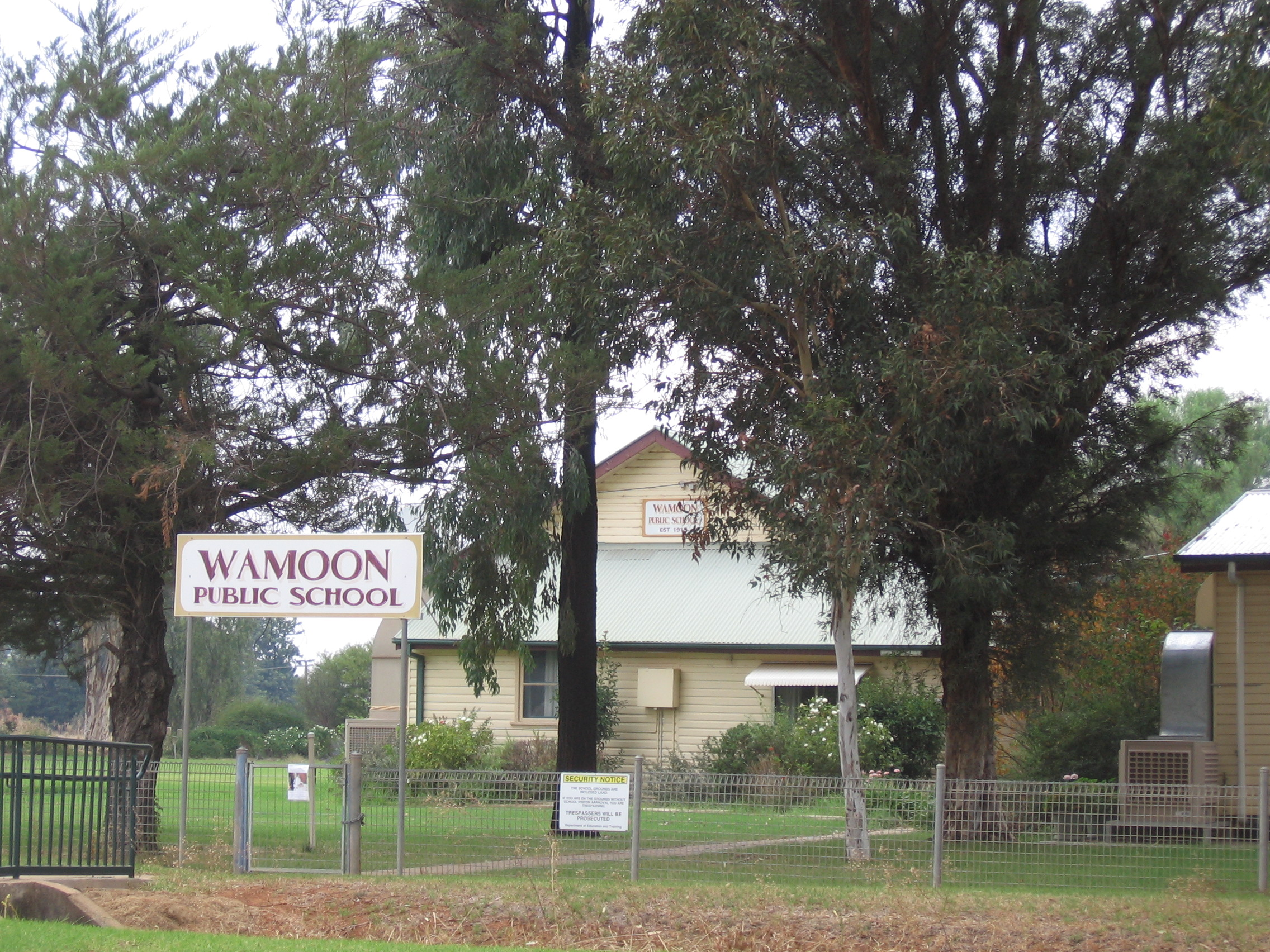
- Wamoon Public School

- Coordinates: 34°31′47″S 146°19′54″E
- Population: Counted as part of Leeton (approx. 200)
- Location: 8 km (5 mi) from Leeton
- LGA(s): Leeton Shire Council
- County: Cooper
- Parish: Tuckerbil
- State electorate(s): Murray
- Federal division(s): Farrer

Wamoon is a village in Leeton Shire in the Riverina region of New South Wales, Australia. Wamoon is located 8.8 kilometres (5.5 mi) from Leeton along the Irrigation Way to the Leeton CBD and Henry Lawson Drive to the Leeton suburb of Wattle Hill. Wamoon provides a village of homes to the farmers of northern Leeton and there is a small primary school known as Wamoon Public School.

Wamoon Post Office opened in July 1920 and closed in 1983.

In 1993 Geographical Names Board of New South Wales deleted Wamoon when the village was removed from official government publication of locality names. In May 2006 the Geographical Names Board of New South Wales approved the reinstatement of Wamoon as a village.

== Sports ==
The town has a team in the Group 20 Rugby League competition with neighbouring village Yanco, the Yanco-Wamoon Hawks. They are renowned for winning five successive titles from 1992-1996, a competition record. The club briefly merged with rivals Narrandera from 2012-2014 as the Bidgee Hurricanes, but the sides demerged ahead of the 2015 season.
