= Yoogali =

- Town
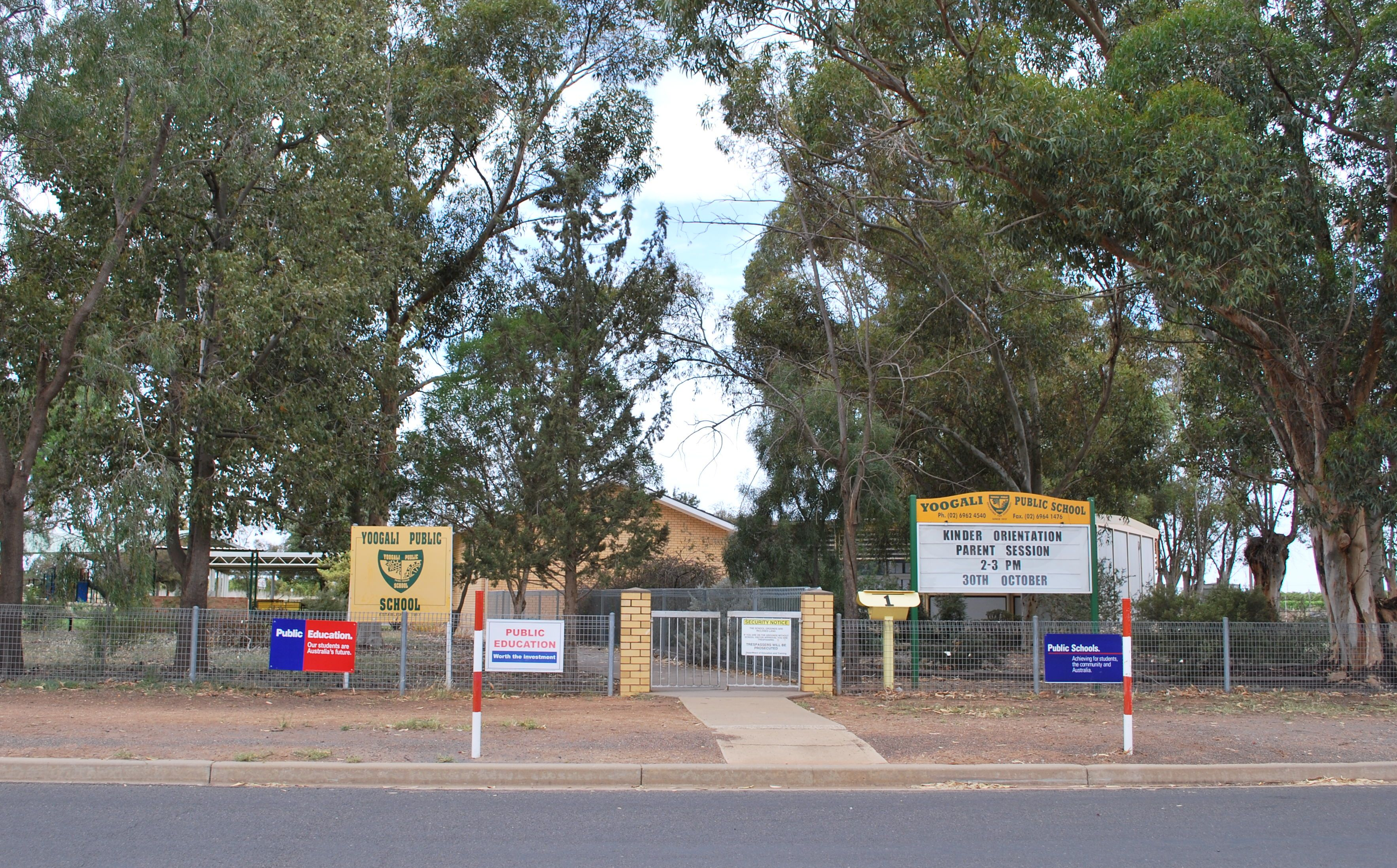
- Public school

- Coordinates: 34°18′0″S 146°05′0″E
- Country: Australia
- State: New South Wales
- LGA: City of Griffith
- Location: 569 km (354 mi) SW of Sydney; 463 km (288 mi) N of Melbourne; 4 km (2.5 mi) E of Griffith

Government
  - State electorate: Murray
  - Federal division: Farrer

Population
  - Total: 1,334 (2021 census)
- Postcode: 2680
- County: Cooper

Yoogali is a small town and suburb of Griffith in the Riverina region of the Australian state of New South Wales. It is located in the City of Griffith local government area. It is situated between Griffith and Yenda, just outside the Mooreville Industrial Estate. At the 2021 census, Yoogali had a population of 1,334.

== History ==
Yoogali Post Office opened on 17 March 1924 and closed in 1991.

== Today ==
It currently houses a club, beautician & hairdresser salon, a specialty hairdresser salon, a cafe, 2 car dealerships, a vet, 2 plant nurseries, a public school, a private school and a special education school.

== Heritage listings ==
Yoogali has a number of heritage-listed sites, including:

- Edon Street: Our Lady of Pompeii Roman Catholic Church

Preceding station	Former services	Following station
Griffith Terminus	Griffith–Yanco Line	Widgelli towards Yanco
