= Stanbridge, New South Wales =

Stanbridge
- Town
- Coordinates: 34°31′3″S 146°14′8″E
- Country: Australia
- State: New South Wales
- LGA: Leeton Shire
- Location: 6 km (3.7 mi) from Whitton; 8 km (5.0 mi) from Gogeldrie

Government
  - State electorate: Murray
  - Federal division: Farrer
- Elevation: 144 m (472 ft)

Population
  - Total: 204 (2021 census)
- Postcode: 2705
- County: Cooper

Stanbridge is a town/community in Leeton Shire, New South Wales, Australia. It is in the central part of the Riverina. It is situated by road, about 6 kilometres (3.7 mi) east from Whitton, 8 kilometres (5.0 mi) north west from Gogeldrie and 20 kilometres (12 mi) west of Leeton. At the 2021 census, Stanbridge had a population of 204 people.

A major local employer is Freedom Foods, a maker of health foods including cereals, biscuits, and bars. The company moved to Stanbridge from Melbourne in 2009 and employs about 76 people.
