= Murrami, New South Wales =

Murrami
- Town
- Coordinates: 34°26′0″S 146°18′0″E
- Country: Australia
- State: New South Wales
- LGA: Leeton Shire

Government
  - State electorate: Murray
  - Federal division: Farrer

Population
  - Total: 288 (2021 census)
- Postcode: 2705
- County: Cooper

Murrami is a village in the Leeton Shire in New South Wales, Australia. The name comes from an aboriginal word for 'crayfish'.
