= City of Griffith =

- Local government area
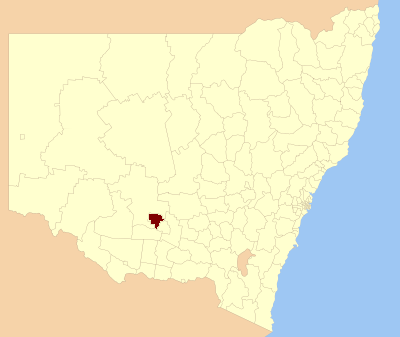
- Location in New South Wales

- Interactive map of City of Griffith
- Coordinates: 34°17′24″S 146°2′24″E
- Country: Australia
- State: New South Wales
- Region: Riverina
- Council seat: Griffith

Government
  - Mayor: Doug Curran
  - State electorate: Murray
  - Federal division: Farrer

Area
  - Total: 1,639.9 km^{2} (633.2 sq mi)

Population
  - Totals: 25,641 (2016); 26,882 (2018 est.)
  - Density: 15.6357/km^{2} (40.4963/sq mi)
- Website: City of Griffith
LGAs around City of Griffith
Carrathool	Carrathool	Narrandera
Carrathool	City of Griffith	Leeton
Murrumbidgee	Murrumbidgee	Leeton

The City of Griffith is a local government area in the Riverina region of south-western New South Wales, Australia. The area comprises 1,640 square kilometres (630 sq mi) and is located in the Murrumbidgee Irrigation Area and on Kidman Way.

The mayor of the City of Griffith Council is Clr. Doug Curran, an unaligned politician.

== Main towns and villages ==
In addition to Griffith, the area includes the towns and villages of Willbriggie, Hanwood, Beelbangera, Bilbul, Yoogali, Widgelli, Yenda, Lake Wyangan, Tharbogang and Warburn and the suburbs of Collina, Driver, North Griffith, East Griffith, West Griffith, South Griffith, Murrumbidgee, Mayfair, Pioneer Mooreville and Wickhams Hill.

== Demographics ==
At the 2011 census, there were 24,364 people in the City of Griffith local government area, of these 50.2 per cent were male and 49.8 per cent were female. Aboriginal and Torres Strait Islander people made up 4.1 per cent of the population, which was higher than the national and state averages of 2.5 per cent. The median age of people in the City of Griffith LGA was 36 years, which was slightly lower than the national median of 37 years. Children aged 0 – 14 years made up 22.5 per cent of the population and people aged 65 years and over made up 19.8 per cent of the population. Of people in the area aged 15 years and over, 53.7 per cent were married and 9 per cent were either divorced or separated.

Population growth in the City of Griffith between the 2011 census and the 2011 census was 0.97 per cent. When compared with total population growth of Australia for the same period, being 12.73 per cent, population growth in the City of Griffith local government area was significantly lower than the national average. The median weekly income of $1056 for residents within the City of Griffith was lower than the national average of $1,234.

== Economy ==
The agricultural industry and value added food and beverage manufacturing / processing underpins the strength of the region. The area is a major wine grape growing area, prune, rice and citrus with emerging industries such as; nuts (Almonds and Walnuts), chicken breeding, growing and processing, cotton, cereals, mixed farming, fruit (melons, pumpkins, onions, cherries, tomatoes, olives) and aquaculture.

The Griffith area relies on the gravity fed irrigation scheme, managed by privately owned Murrumbidgee Irrigation. The region's red loam soils and Mediterranean climate are conducive to growing conditions for most crops. Agriculture is an important industry economically for the region in terms of value, the number of people the industry employs, innovation, value added processing and the global and dynamic business that exists here because of agriculture. Griffith is a major service centre for the agricultural sector (among others) and services a region with a population of 50,000 people.

Griffith has 12 wineries – 5 of which are on the top 10 exporters list for Australia, all of which are family owned and run businesses. Griffith's largest winery, Casella Family Wines employs 650 people, employment in the wine industry increases during the vintage season (December through to April). The region supplies 75% of NSW wine grapes and exports over $800m worth of wine each year.

Griffith has two large juice companies – Real Juice and Harvey Fresh which supports the Valencia growers in the region, as well as carrots, beetroot, apple and pear. The region supplies 70% of NSW citrus, many of the navels and mandarins grown here are exported.

Treetops Olives Plantation also process olives in brine for the table market. Many of these are sold to a local food processor who marinades, makes tapenade as well as other sauces and product.

Griffith producers 25% of Australia's poultry with an emphasis on growth. Baiada Poultry purchased Bartters and the Steggles brand 5 years ago and has identified Griffith as one of the major centre's for chicken production in Australia. The plan is to double production from processing 750,000 birds a week to 1.5million a week. This phenomenal growth will require addition broiler chicken farms in the order of 200 sheds in the region. Baiada Poultry is the largest employer in Griffith, employing close to 700 people and with their growth plans complete will employ close to 900 people with up to 200 external jobs created.

The broader region supplies Australia with 90% of their rice and an above average year for rice would produce more than 1,000,000 tonnes of rice, there is also major processing of rice at Sunrice in Leeton, Coleambally and Deniliquin who are a major employer with a global footprint.

== Health and education ==
Griffith is a major centre for health services with a facility in Griffith Base Hospital and the addition of St Vincent's Community Private Hospital soon to be built to cater for day surgeries and specialist appointments. The recently opened St Vincent's Private Hospital currently employs 35 staff, 40 at full capacity.

An MOU was recently signed with Deakin University, TAFE NSW – Riverina Institute, Griffith, Wagga and Albury Councils to encourage degree pathways through TAFE and research collaborations with local industry. An existing MOU is also in place with CSU.

== Council ==
Griffith City Council

Type
- Type: Unicameral

History
- Founded: 1928 (as a council); 1 July 1987 (elevated to city)
- Preceded by: Wade Shire Council (1928–1982); Griffith Shire Council (1982–1987)

Leadership
- Mayor: Doug Curran, Independent since 2024
- Deputy Mayor: Anne Napoli, Anne Napoli Team since 26 September 2024

Structure
- Seats: 12 (11 elected councillors and 1 directly elected mayor)
- Political groups: Independents (8); Chris Sutton Team (2); Anne Napoli Team (1); Independent Liberal (1)
- Length of term: 3 years (renewable)
- Salary: $21,733 (councillors) $46,040 (mayor)

Elections
- Voting system: Undivided proportional (councillors); Preferential voting (mayor)
- First election: 1928
- Last election: 2024

Meeting place
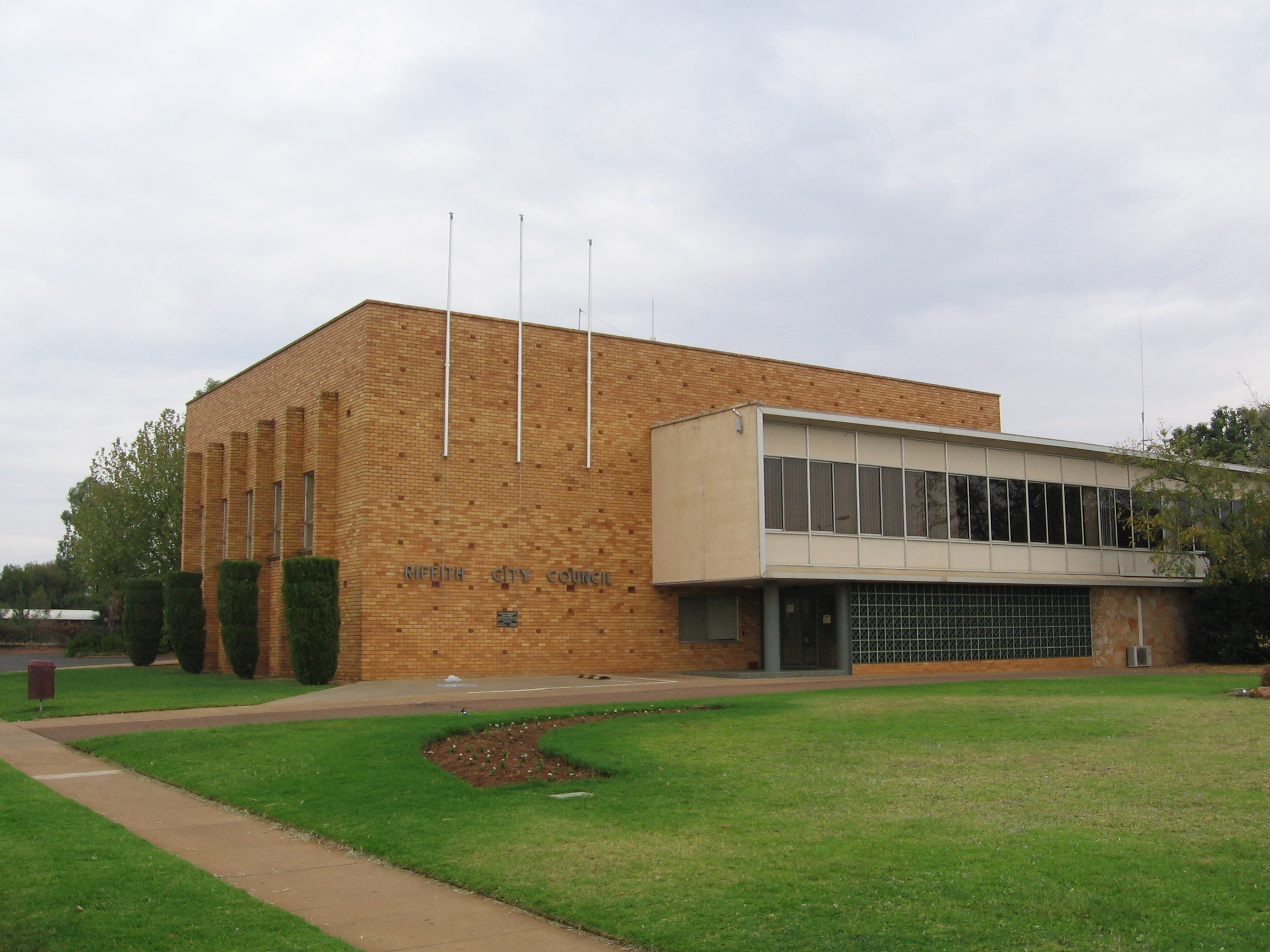
- Griffith City Council Chambers; 1 Benerembah Street, Griffith; New South Wales

=== Current composition and election method ===
Griffith City Council is composed of twelve councillors, including the mayor, for a fixed four-year term of office. The mayor is directly elected while the eleven other Councillors are elected proportionally as one entire ward. The most recent election was held on 10 September 2016, and the makeup of the council, including the mayor, is as follows:

Party	Councillors
Independents	8
Chris Sutton Team	2
Anne Napoli Team	1
Independent Liberal	1
Total	12

The current Council, elected in 2021, is:

Councillor	Party	Notes
Doug Curran	Independent	Mayor
Glen Andreazza	Independent	Deputy Mayor
Shari Blumer	Independent	
Simon Croce	Independent	
Jenny Ellis	Independent	
Manjit Singh Lally	Independent	
Melissa Marin	Chris Sutton Team	
Anne Napoli	Anne Napoli Team	
Christine Stead	Independent Liberal	
Chris Sutton	Chris Sutton Team	
Laurie Testoni	Independent	
Dino Zappacosta	Independent	

== Election results ==
=== 2024 ===
2024 New South Wales local elections: Griffith
Party	Candidate	Votes	%	±%
Independent	1. Doug Curran (elected mayor); 2. Shari Blumer (elected 5)	2,588	19.9	−8.7
Independent	1. Anne Napoli (elected 1); 2. Melissa Marin; 3. Tony O'Grady (elected 8)	2,583	19.9	+5.2
Independent	1. Jenny Ellis (elected 4); 2. Damien Thorne	1,679	12.9	+8.6
Independent	1. Satwinder Singh; 2. Graeme Cotton; 3. Mark Dal Bon (elected 6)	1,590	12.2	
Independent	1. Christine Stead (Ind. Lib) (elected 3); 2. Dino Zappacosta	1,531	11.8	+6.5
Independent	1. Laurie Testoni (elected 2); 2. Glen Andreazza	1,243	9.6	
Independent	1. Manjit Lally; 2. Christopher Sutton; 3. Darshna Surana	863	6.6	
Independent	Scott Groat (elected 7)	849	6.5	
Independent	Bill Graeme	64	0.5	
Total formal votes		12,990	88.4	
Informal votes		1,704	11.6	
Turnout		14,694	86.6	

=== 2021 ===
Elected councillor	Party
Laurie Testoni	Independent (Group B)
Shari Blumer	Independent (Group B)
Chris Sutton	Chris Sutton Team
Melissa Marin	Chris Sutton Team
Anne Napoli	Anne Napoli Group
Dino Zappacosta	Independent (Group D)
Manjit Singh Lally	Independent (Group D)
Simon Croce	Independent (Group C)
Jenny Ellis	Independent
Christine Stead	Independent (Group E)

2021 New South Wales local elections: Griffith
Party	Candidate	Votes	%	±%
Independent (Group B)		3,589	28.6	
Chris Sutton Team		2,580	20.5	
Anne Napoli Group		1,850	14.7	
Independent (Group D)		1,171	9.3	
Independent (Group C)		779	6.2	
Independent (Group E)		664	5.3	
Independent	Jenny Ellis	536	4.3	
Independent (Group G)		530	4.2	
Independent	Rina Mercuri	445	3.5	
Independent	Michael Crump	334	2.7	
Independent	Robert Campbell	78	0.6	
Total formal votes		12,556	84.8	
Informal votes		2,250	15.2	
Turnout		14,806	88.1	

=== 2016 ===
2016 New South Wales local elections: Griffith
Party	Candidate	Votes	%	±%
Independent (Group C)	1. Doug Curran (elected 1); 2. Mike Neville (elected 3); 3. Brian Simpson (elected 7); 4. Craig Burley	3,229	26.57	
Independent (Group A)	1. Dino Zappacosta (elected 2); 2. Leon Thorpe	1,281	10.54	
Independent (Group E)	1. Simon Croce (elected 4); 2. John Dal Broi (ineligible)	2,219	18.26	
Independent (Group F)	1. Christine Stead (elected 5); 2. Ricky Chugha	1,156	9.51	
Independent (Group D)	1. Anne Napoli (elected 6); 2. Deb Longhurst (elected 10); 3. Rina Mercuri (elected 11)	1,553	12.78	
Independent (Group B)	1. Paul Snaidero (elected 8); 2. Edwin Mardon (elected 9); 3. Andy Armstrong; 4. Michele Devery	1,589	13.08	
Independent	Paul Rossetto	469	3.86	
Independent	Tom Mackerras	294	2.42	
Independent (Group G)	1. George Youssef; 2. Mohannad Suleiman	226	1.86	
Independent	Max Buljubasic	81	0.67	
Independent	Lance Perry	34	0.28	
Independent	Franz Krogh	21	0.17	
Total formal votes		12,152	88.31	
Informal votes		1,609	11.69	
Turnout		13,761	81.61	

== Sister cities ==
Griffith has sister city relations with the following cities:

- Harbin, China
- Treviso, Italy
- City of Fairfield, New South Wales, Australia
