= Narrandera Shire =

- Local government area
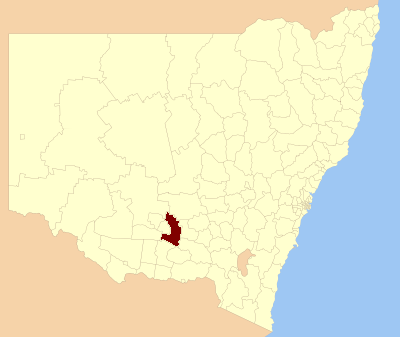
- Location in New South Wales

- Interactive map of Narrandera Shire
- Coordinates: 34°45′S 146°33′E
- Country: Australia
- State: New South Wales
- Region: Riverina
- Established: 1 January 1960
- Council seat: Narrandera

Government
  - Mayor: Neville Kschenka (Independent)
  - State electorate: Cootamundra
  - Federal division: Farrer

Area
  - Total: 4,116.2 km^{2} (1,589.3 sq mi)

Population
  - Totals: 5,853 (2016); 5,931 (2018 est.)
  - Density: 1.42194/km^{2} (3.6828/sq mi)
- Website: Narrandera Shire
LGAs around Narrandera Shire
Carrathool	Bland	Coolamon
Leeton	Narrandera Shire	Wagga Wagga
Murrumbidgee	Federation	Lockhart

Narrandera Shire is a local government area in the Riverina region of south-western New South Wales, Australia. The Shire is located adjacent to the Sturt and Newell Highways.

The present Narrandera Shire was formed on 1 January 1960 by an amalgamation of the previous Narrandera Municipality and Yanko Shire. The first Narrandera Municipality was incorporated on 18 March 1885. Narrandera Shire is a large shire in the geographical centre of the Riverina, with over 1,500 kilometres (930 mi) of roads within its boundaries.

The Shire includes the town of Narrandera and the villages of Grong Grong, Binya and Barellan.

The mayor of Narrandera Shire is Neville Kschenka, an independent politician.

== Council ==
Narrandera Shire Council

History
- Founded: 1 January 1960
- Preceded by: Narrandera Municipal Council; Yanko Shire Council

Leadership
- Mayor: Neville Kschenka, Independent since September 2016
- Deputy Mayor: Sue Ruffles, Independent since 2022

Structure
- Seats: 9
- Political groups: Independents (9)
- Length of term: 4 years (renewable)

Elections
- Last election: 2024
- Next election: 2028

Meeting place
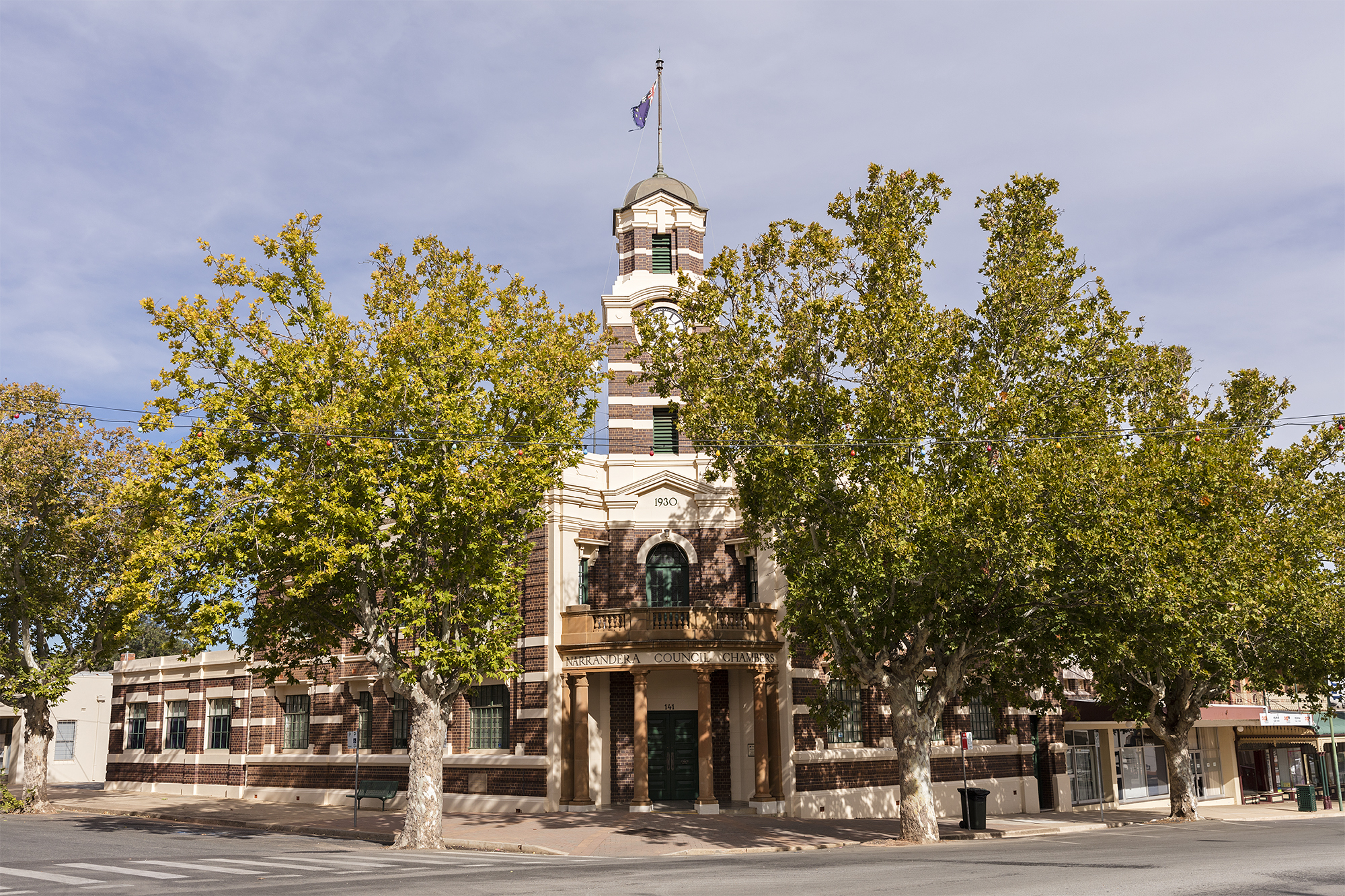
- Narranderra Council Chambers; 141 East St, Narrandera; New South Wales

=== Current composition and election method ===
Narrandera Shire Council is composed of nine councillors elected proportionally as a single ward. All councillors are elected for a fixed four-year term of office. The mayor and deputy mayor are elected by the councillors to two year terms at the first meeting of the council.

== Election results ==
=== 2024 ===
2024 New South Wales local elections: Narrandera
Party	Candidate	Votes	%	±%
Independent	Neville Kschenka (elected)	497	15.0	+0.3
Independent	Susan Ruffles (elected)	418	12.6	+3.5
Independent	Cameron Rouse (elected)	321	9.7	
Independent	Bob Manning (elected)	316	9.5	+5.7
Independent	Braden Lyons (elected)	288	8.7	−3.6
Independent	Peter Dawson (elected)	261	8.2	−0.1
Independent	Jenny Clarke (elected)	264	8.0	−0.7
Independent	Anthony Marsh	259	7.8	
Independent	Tracey Lewis (elected)	250	7.5	−3.0
Independent	Cameron Lander (elected)	242	7.3	−0.2
Independent	Narelle Payne	136	4.1	−0.1
Independent	Andrew Jamieson	54	1.6	
Total formal votes		3,316	94.7	
Informal votes		187	5.3	
Turnout		3,503	81.3	

=== 2016 ===
2016 New South Wales local elections: Narrandera
Party	Candidate	Votes	%	±%
Independent	Jenny Clarke (elected 1)	567	16.82	
Independent	Tracey Lewis (elected 2)	492	14.60	
Independent	Kevin Morris (elected 3)	337	10.00	
Independent	Barbara Bryon (elected 4)	292	8.66	
Independent	David Fahey (elected 5)	277	8.22	
Independent	Neville Kschenka (elected 6)	211	6.26	
Independent	Wesley Hall (elected 7)	151	4.48	
Independent	Tammy Galvin (elected 8)	137	4.06	
Independent	Narelle Payne (elected 9)	119	3.53	
Independent	Cameron Lander	140	4.15	
Independent	Michelle Henderson	123	3.65	
Independent	Robert Manning	94	2.79	
Independent	Des Edwards	94	2.79	
Independent	David Marwood	81	2.40	
Independent	Anthony French	73	2.17	
Independent	Anthony Marsh	72	2.14	
Independent	Scott Mitchell	61	1.81	
Independent	Barry Mayne	36	1.07	
Independent	Zuzana Crook	14	0.42	
Total formal votes		3,371	96.42	
Informal votes		125	3.58	
Turnout		3,496	80.39	

== Mayors ==
=== Mayors of Narrandera Council (1885–1959) ===
The list of mayors of Narrandera Council (1885–1959) appears below.

Mayor	Term
Robert Heatie Ferrier	1885
Henry Daniel Adams	1886
John Armstrong	1887
James Moulton	1888
Bruce Kennedy	1988–1989
James Bowes	1889 (February–March)
John Fleming Willans (1st term)	1890–1893
Michael Cohen	1894
John Fleming Willans (2nd term)	1894 (July)
Peter Sullivan	1895
James Armstrong	1896
Lewis S Abrahams	1897
Thomas Henry Elwin (1st term)	1898
Fred Allan Smith (1st term)	1899–1900
James Joseph Quirk	1901
Fred Allan Smith (2nd term)	1902–1903
Ebenezer C H Matthews (1st term)	1904–1906
Thomas Henry Elwin (2nd term)	1907–1913
James Charles Little	1914
Thomas Henry Elwin (3rd term)	1915–1916
Ebernezer C H Matthews (2nd term)	1916 (November)
John Anderson McPherson	1917–1919
Robert Henry Hankinson (1st term)	1920–1921
George Norman Dixon	1922–1923
Robert Henry Hankinson (2nd term)	1924
William H Harden	1924 (April), 1925
Robert Henry Hankinson (3rd term)	1926
Samuel Henry Barker	1927
Robert Henry Hankinson (4th term)	1928–1930
Frederick Thelwell Yeoman (1st term)	1930 (August), 1931
Thomas Henry Mancy	1932–1934
Frederick Thelwell Yeoman (2nd term)	1935
Alexander Baird	1936–1937
Frederick Thelwell Yeoman (3rd term)	1938
Ralph E R Skinner	1939
Francis Charles Garner (1st term)	1940
Thomas Gordon (1st term)	1941
Richard Eric Blamey	1942
Thomas Gordon (2nd term)	1943–1944
George F Hepburn	1945
William Joseph Gammage	1946
John Archer Lorimer	1947
Francis Charles Garner (2nd term)	1948–1950
Robert Henry Hankinson (5th term)	1951
William George Armstrong	1951 (June), 1959

=== Mayors of Narrandera Shire (1960–present) ===
The list of mayors of Narrandera Shire Council (1960–present) appears below.

Mayor	Term
Richard Percival Broad	1960–1961
Edward Gilbert Day (1st term)	1962
Archibald Herbert McIntosh	1963–1965
Edward Gilbert Day (2nd term)	1966–1968
Ronald Sydney Stivens	1969–1973
September elections commenced
Kenneth Lionel Kiesling (1st term)	1973–1975
Bruce Charles (1st term)	1975–1977
Kenneth Lionel Kiesling (2nd term)	1977–1979
Bruce Charles (2nd term)	1979–1980
Warwick John Heckendorf (1st term)	1980–1984
John Browne Driscoll	1984–1987
Warwick John Heckendorf (2nd term)	1987–1990
Shirley Ann Hocking (1st term)	1990–1991
Desmond Joseph Edwards (1st term)	1991–1994
Shirley Ann Hocking (2nd term)	1994–1996
John Beattie (1st term)	1996–1999
Desmond Joseph Edwards (2nd term)	1999–2000
John Beattie (2nd term)	2000–2002
Desmond Joseph Edwards (3rd term)	2002–2007
John William Sullivan	2007–2008
Graham Eipper (1st term)	2008–2009
Wesley Munro Hall	2009–2010
Graham Eipper (2nd term)	2010–2011
Jennifer Clare Clarke	2011–2016
Neville Raymond Kschenka	2016–present
