= Leeton Shire =

- Local government area
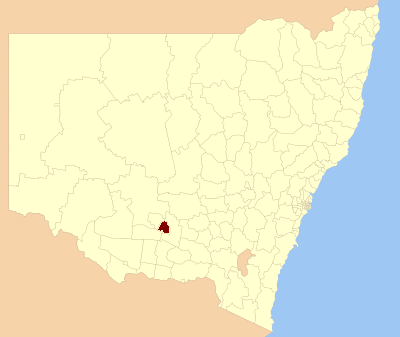
- Location in New South Wales

- Interactive map of Leeton Shire
- Coordinates: 34°33′S 146°24′E
- Country: Australia
- State: New South Wales
- Region: Riverina
- Established: 6 January 1928
- Council seat: Leeton

Government
  - Mayor: Cr George Weston
  - State electorate: Murray
  - Federal division: Farrer

Area
  - Total: 1,167 km^{2} (451 sq mi)

Population
  - Totals: 11,168 (2016); 11,438 (2018 est.)
  - Density: 9.570/km^{2} (24.786/sq mi)
- Website: Leeton Shire
LGAs around Leeton Shire
Carrathool	Narrandera	Narrandera
Griffith	Leeton Shire	Narrandera
Murrumbidgee	Narrandera	Narrandera

Leeton Shire is a local government area in the Riverina region of New South Wales, Australia. The Shire is located adjacent to the Murrumbidgee River and falls within the Murrumbidgee Irrigation Area.

The Shire includes the town of Leeton and the small towns of Yanco, Gogeldrie, Whitton, Wamoon, Stoney Point, Murrami, Corbie Hill, Amesbury, Merungle Hill, Fivebough and Stanbridge and the suburbs of Parkview, Wattle Hill, Wiradjuri, North Leeton, Gralee and Willimbong.

The shire was created on 6 January 1928 under the provisions of the Irrigation Act 1912 from land previously part of Yanko Shire and was originally called Willimbong Shire. It was renamed as Leeton Shire on 10 July 1946.

The mayor of Leeton Shire is Cr George Weston.

== Council ==
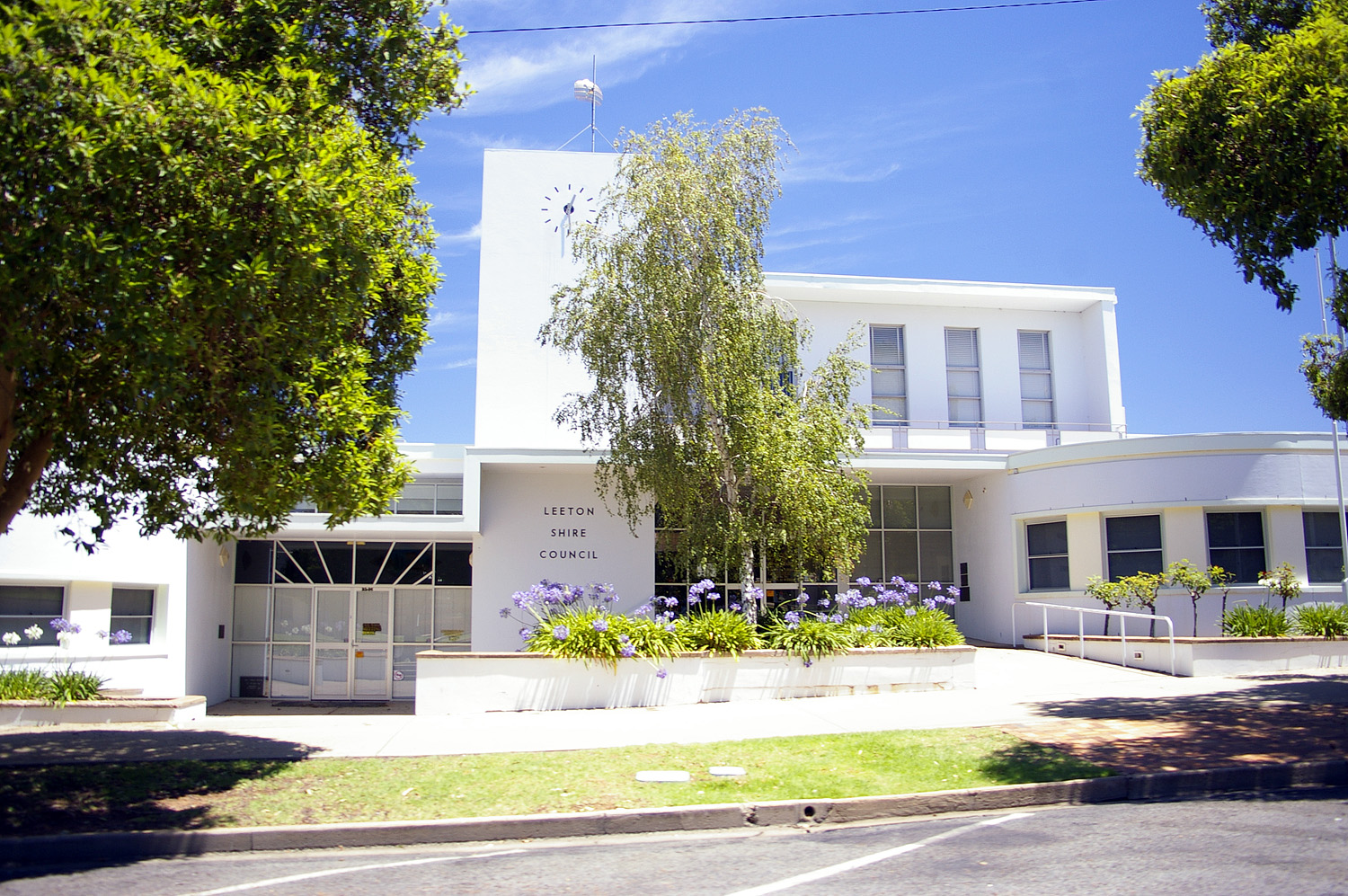
Leeton Shire Council Chambers

=== Current composition and election method ===
Leeton Shire Council is composed of nine councillors elected proportionally as a single ward. All councillors are elected for a fixed four-year term of office. The mayor is elected by the councillors at the first meeting of the council. The most recent election was held on 14 September 2024, and the makeup of the council is as follows:

Party	Councillors
Independents and Unaligned	7
Independent Labor	1
Independent Liberal	1
Total	9

The current Council, elected in 2024, in order of election, is:

Councillor	Party	Notes
Stephen Tynan	Independent	
Sandra Nardi	Independent	
George Weston	Independent	Mayor
Krystal Maytom	Independent	
Michael Kidd	Independent Labor	Deputy Mayor
Tracey Morris	Independent	
Boston Edwards	Independent Liberal	
Sarah Tiffen	Unaligned	
Nicholas Wright	Left-Wing Independent	

== History ==
The first election of council took place on 8 December 1928, electing eight councilors from four ridings (A through D). The first mayor of Willimbong Shire President was Major J.S. Dooley (1874–1946), who was elected at the council's first meeting by "draw from the hat" after the council vote between himself and Mr. W.J. Adams resulted in a tie.

== Election results ==
=== 2024 ===
2024 New South Wales local elections: Leeton
Party	Candidate	Votes	%	±%
Independent	Stephen Tynan (elected)	962	16.54	+16.54
Independent	Nicholas Wright (elected)	194	3.34	+3.34
Independent	Bill Robertson	155	2.67	+2.67
Independent	Sandra Nardi (elected)	845	14.53	+5.85
Independent	George Weston (elected)	938	16.13	+5.84
Independent	Sarah Tiffen (elected)	169	2.91	+2.91
Independent	Krystal Maytom (elected)	674	11.59	+2.60
Independent Labor	Michael Kidd (elected)	886	15.23	+6.91
Independent	Tracey Morris (elected)	545	9.37	+4.00
Independent Liberal	Boston Edwards (elected)	448	7.70	+7.70
Total formal votes		5,711		
Informal votes		491	7.92	
Turnout		6,202		

=== 2021 ===
2021 New South Wales local elections: Leeton
Party	Candidate	Votes	%	±%
Independent	Paul Smith (elected)	845	13.84	+5.58
Independent	George Weston (elected)	628	10.29	+5.08
Independent	Tony Reneker (elected)	823	13.48	+5.66
Independent	Krystal Maytom (elected)	548	8.98	+8.98
Independent	Tony Ciccia (elected)	512	8.39	+2.07
Independent	Sandra Nardi (elected)	530	8.68	+3.16
Independent Labor	Michael Kidd (elected)	508	8.32	+2.28
Independent	Tracy Morris (elected)	345	5.65	+0.48
Independent	Matthew Holt (elected)	308	5.05	+5.05
Independent	Brian Conroy	210	3.44	+3.44
Independent	Patricia Bowles	190	3.11	+0.79
Independent	Daryl Odewahn	176	2.88	+2.88
Independent	Emerson Doig	156	2.56	−0.33
Independent	Lynsey Reilly	152	2.49	+2.49
Independent	Bill Barwick	101	1.65	−0.41
Independent	Jo Roberts	73	1.20	+1.20
Total formal votes		6,105	96.08	−0.12
Informal votes		249	3.92	+0.12
Turnout		6,354	82.54	+0.05

=== 2016 ===
2016 New South Wales local elections: Leeton
Party	Candidate	Votes	%	±%
Independent	Paul Maytom (elected 1)	2,374	38.75	
Independent	George Weston (elected 2)	319	5.21	
Independent	Paul Smith (elected 3)	506	8.26	
Independent	Tony Reneker (elected 4)	479	7.82	
Independent	Tracey Morris (elected 5)	317	5.17	
Independent Labor	Michael Kidd (elected 6)	370	6.04	
Independent	Tony Ciccia (elected 7)	387	6.32	
Independent	Sandra Nardi (elected 8)	338	5.52	
Independent	Peter Davidson (elected 9)	188	3.07	
Independent	Emerson Doig	177	2.89	
Independent	Michael Ierano	209	3.41	
Independent	Patty Bowles	142	2.32	
Independent	William Barwick	126	2.06	
Independent	Maryann Vitelli	112	1.83	
Independent	Arnah Garwood	82	1.34	
Total formal votes		6,126	96.20	
Informal votes		242	3.80	
Turnout		6,368	82.49	

=== 1934 ===
Riding	Elected councillor	Party
A	F. C. Mountford	Independent
A	Tom J. Ashton	Independent
B	Ambrose George Enticknap	Independent Labor
B	R. A. Struck	Independent
C	John S. Dooley	Independent
C	W. J. Lamprell	Independent
D	T. Darchy	Independent
D	H. L. Tooth	Independent

1934 New South Wales local elections: Willimbong Shire
Party	Votes	%	Swing	Seats	Change
Independents	1,170	72.3	-21.3	7	Steady
Independent Labor	448	27.7	+18.5 (Note: Based on the 1928 elections as Independent Labor ran only in an uncontested riding in 1934.)	1	Steady
Total formal votes	1,618				
Total formal ballots	809				
Informal votes	19				
Turnout					
Registered voters					

=== 1931 ===
1931 New South Wales local elections: Willimbong Shire
Party	Votes	%	Swing	Seats	Change
Independents	1,307	93.6	+2.8	7	Steady
Labor	89	6.4	+6.4	0	Steady
Independent Labor	0	0.0	N/A (Note: Independent Labor only ran in Riding B where a vote was not held and the candidates who stood were elected unopposed)	1	Steady
Total formal votes	1,396				
Total formal ballots	698	100.0			
Informal votes					
Turnout	698	60.7			
Registered voters	1,149 (Note: Excluding Riding B which was uncontested)				

=== 1928 ===
Riding	Elected councillor	Party
A	A. T. McKay	Independent
A	W. J. Adams	Independent
B	R. Struck	Independent
B	Ambrose George Enticknap	Independent Labor
C	A. Jamieson	Independent
C	John S. Dooley	Independent
D	F. J. Blackmore	Independent
D	J. McCleary	Independent

1928 New South Wales local elections: Willimbong Shire
Party	Votes	%	Swing	Seats	Change
Independents	1,484	90.8	new	8	▲8
Independent Labor	150	9.2	new	1	▲1
Total formal votes	1,634				
Total formal ballots					
Informal votes					
Turnout					
Registered voters					

== Heritage listings ==
Leeton Shire has a number of heritage-listed sites, including:

- Gogeldrie Weir
- Hydro Hotel
- Koonadan Historic Site
- Leeton District Lands Office
- Leeton District Office artefacts
- Leeton railway station
- Roxy Community Theatre
- Yanco Weir
