= Cooper County, New South Wales =

Cooper New South Wales
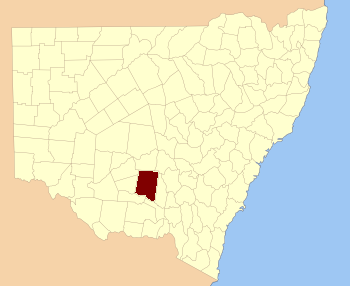
- Location in New South Wales
Lands administrative divisions around Cooper:
Dowling	Dowling	Gipps
Sturt	Cooper	Bourke
Boyd	Mitchell	Mitchell

Cooper County is one of the 141 cadastral divisions of New South Wales. It contains the town of Barellan. The Murrumbidgee River is the southern boundary.

Cooper County was named in honour of the merchant and philanthropist Sir Daniel Cooper (1821–1902).

== Parishes within this county ==
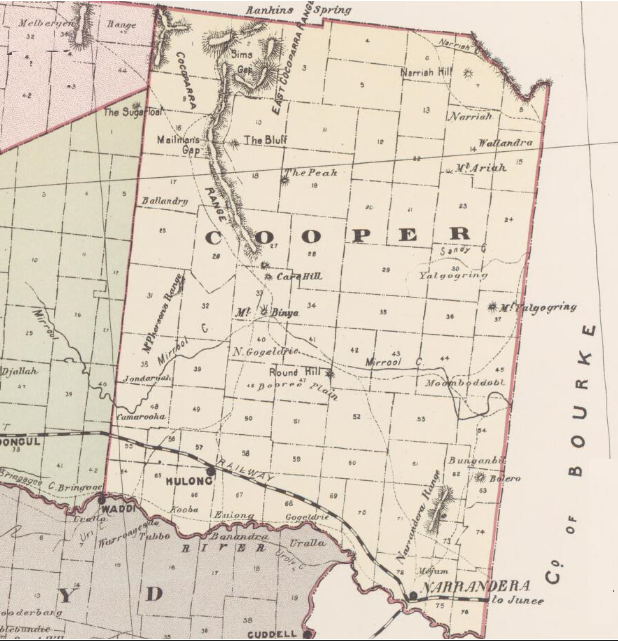
Cooper County NSW as shown on John Sands 1886 map)

A full list of parishes found within this county; their current LGA and mapping coordinates to the approximate centre of each location is as follows:

Parish	LGA	Coordinates
Ariah	Bland Shire Council	34°03′54″S 146°42′04″E
Barellan	Narrandera Shire Council	34°13′54″S 146°29′04″E
Barralong	Narrandera Shire Council	34°20′54″S 146°33′04″E
Beremabere	Narrandera Shire Council	34°32′54″S 146°34′04″E
Bingar	Carrathool Shire Council	34°07′54″S 146°12′04″E
Binya	Carrathool Shire Council	34°12′54″S 146°18′04″E
Bogolong	Narrandera Shire Council	34°39′54″S 146°43′04″E
Bolaro	Narrandera Shire Council	34°27′54″S 146°44′04″E
Bondi	Leeton Shire Council	34°21′54″S 146°16′04″E
Bourke	Bland Shire Council	33°56′54″S 146°24′04″E
Bourke	Carrathool Shire Council	33°56′54″S 146°25′04″E
Bringan	Carrathool Shire Council	34°27′54″S 146°09′04″E
Brobenah	Narrandera Shire Council	34°26′54″S 146°28′04″E
Bundidgerry	Narrandera Shire Council	34°43′54″S 146°38′04″E
Bunganbil	Narrandera Shire Council	34°26′54″S 146°37′04″E
Bygoo	Bland Shire Council	34°07′54″S 146°48′04″E
Camarooka	Carrathool Shire Council	34°23′54″S 146°02′04″E
Cocoparra	Carrathool Shire Council	33°46′54″S 146°09′04″E
Colaragang	Carrathool Shire Council	34°31′54″S 146°00′04″E
Colchester	Carrathool Shire Council	34°23′54″S 146°09′04″E
Conapaira	Carrathool Shire Council	33°50′54″S 146°16′04″E
Conapaira East	Bland Shire Council	33°49′54″S 146°23′04″E
Conapaira South	Carrathool Shire Council	33°55′54″S 146°17′04″E
Cuba	Carrathool Shire Council	34°32′54″S 146°05′04″E
Cudgel	Leeton Shire Council	34°37′54″S 146°29′04″E
Cudjello	Narrandera Shire Council	34°37′54″S 146°34′04″E
Dallas	Carrathool Shire Council	34°35′54″S 146°14′04″E
Dowling	Bland Shire Council	34°05′54″S 146°36′04″E
Edon	Leeton Shire Council	34°26′54″S 146°22′04″E
Euratha	Bland Shire Council	33°46′54″S 146°32′04″E
Euratha South	Bland Shire Council	33°52′54″S 146°31′04″E
Garoolgan	Narrandera Shire Council	34°10′54″S 146°33′04″E
Gibbs	Narrandera Shire Council	34°21′54″S 146°22′04″E
Gogeldrie	Leeton Shire Council	34°36′54″S 146°20′04″E
Gorton	Carrathool Shire Council	34°20′54″S 146°10′04″E
Grong Grong	Narrandera Shire Council	34°45′54″S 146°42′04″E
Gurragong	Bland Shire Council	33°54′54″S 146°38′04″E
Hebden	Leeton Shire Council	34°25′54″S 146°15′04″E
Hulong	Carrathool Shire Council	34°34′54″S 146°08′04″E
Jondaryan	City of Griffith	34°18′54″S 146°04′04″E
Kolkilbertoo	Bland Shire Council	33°58′54″S 146°32′04″E
Kolkilbertoo East	Bland Shire Council	33°59′54″S 146°36′04″E
Kolkilbertoo South	Bland Shire Council	34°05′54″S 146°30′04″E
Lewes	Bland Shire Council	33°58′54″S 146°43′04″E
Mejum	Narrandera Shire Council	34°38′54″S 146°39′04″E
Moombooldool	Narrandera Shire Council	34°21′54″S 146°40′04″E
Moombooldool North	Narrandera Shire Council	34°16′54″S 146°40′04″E
Moura	Narrandera Shire Council	34°17′54″S 146°23′04″E
Munduburra	Bland Shire Council	33°49′54″S 146°38′04″E
Munduburra	Bland Shire Council	33°50′54″S 146°38′04″E
Narrandera	Narrandera Shire Council	34°42′54″S 146°33′04″E
Narriah	Bland Shire Council	33°51′54″S 146°44′04″E
Narriah	Bland Shire Council	33°50′54″S 146°44′04″E
Naunton	Carrathool Shire Council	34°27′54″S 146°06′04″E
North Bolaro	Narrandera Shire Council	34°21′54″S 146°45′04″E
Oxley	Narrandera Shire Council	34°07′54″S 146°24′04″E
Patterson	Narrandera Shire Council	34°12′54″S 146°24′04″E
Pulletop	Carrathool Shire Council	33°56′54″S 146°08′04″E
Sandy Creek	Bland Shire Council	34°09′54″S 146°41′04″E
Sims Gap	Carrathool Shire Council	33°51′54″S 146°08′04″E
Stanbridge	City of Griffith	34°15′54″S 146°11′04″E
Stanley	Carrathool Shire Council	34°06′54″S 146°18′04″E
Tabbita	Carrathool Shire Council	34°06′54″S 146°06′04″E
Tabbita North	Carrathool Shire Council	34°01′54″S 146°08′04″E
Tenningerie	Leeton Shire Council	34°29′54″S 146°15′04″E
The Bluff	Carrathool Shire Council	34°01′54″S 146°16′04″E
The Peak	Carrathool Shire Council	34°02′54″S 146°25′04″E
Tuckerbil	Leeton Shire Council	34°30′54″S 146°20′04″E
Wallandry	Bland Shire Council	34°00′54″S 146°48′04″E
Wallandry North	Bland Shire Council	33°54′54″S 146°50′04″E
Wammera	Narrandera Shire Council	34°33′54″S 146°40′04″E
Watti	Narrandera Shire Council	34°34′54″S 146°44′04″E
Waugh	Narrandera Shire Council	34°20′54″S 146°29′04″E
Willbriggie	Carrathool Shire Council	34°27′54″S 146°01′04″E
Willimbong	Leeton Shire Council	34°32′54″S 146°28′04″E
Wyangan	City of Griffith	34°12′54″S 146°05′04″E
Yalgogoring	Bland Shire Council	34°14′54″S 146°47′04″E
Yarangery	Leeton Shire Council	34°36′54″S 146°25′04″E
Yenda	City of Griffith	34°17′54″S 146°17′04″E
