= Irrigation Record =

Masthead of Irrigation Record, 1913–1917.

The Irrigation Record was a fortnightly newspaper published in Leeton, New South Wales, Australia from 15 February 1913 to 15 June 1917 by the NSW Water Conservation and Irrigation Commission. Its purpose was to educate new settlers of the fledgling Murrumbidgee Irrigation Area (MIA), about agricultural methods, irrigation techniques, crops, stock and machinery.

== History ==
The first issue of the Irrigation Record for the dissemination of practical information among the farmers of the irrigation areas, has a significance of unusual interest to this State. It marks an epoch in the producing power of the country. It is an evidence that a large territory of highly fertile land is being rescued for the agriculturist and orchardist from the uncertainty of production always associated with a dependence on the ordinary rainfall.

— J G Youll, editor of Irrigation Record, in the first issue of the newspaper on 15 February 1913

Leeton was the first town to be planned under the Murrumbidgee Irrigation Area scheme. The Irrigation Record commenced publication in 1913 and its stated aim was to educate the local residents about irrigation and farming.

Articles covered developments in the area such as the establishment of the town including churches, schools, police stations and the agricultural industry. The editor of the Irrigation Record was Mr J G (John Gibson) Youll, later a Councillor of the Shire of Wade. Feature articles by Walter Burley Griffin about the planning of Leeton and Griffith were published in May and June 1915.

The last issue of the Irrigation Record was published on 15 June 1917. The economic constraints of World War I were cited in the penultimate edition as one reason for its closure, along with the belief that the journal had served its purpose to educate new settlers.

== Availability ==
The Irrigation Record was microfilmed by W. & F. Pascoe onto 1 reel of 35mm microfilm. The microfilm can be viewed at the State Library of New South Wales, and the National Library of Australia.

The project to digitise the Irrigation Record 1913–1917 was jointly funded by Griffith City Council, McWilliam's Wines and Murrumbidgee Irrigation Limited. The newspaper is part of the Australian Newspapers Digitisation Program of the National Library of Australia.

== See also ==
- List of newspapers in Australia
- List of newspapers in New South Wales
- The Murrumbidgee Irrigator – newspaper published in Leeton from 1915 onwards
