= Norm Houghton =

Norm Houghton may refer to:

- Norm Houghton (magician) (1909–1998), Canadian magician
- Norm Houghton (historian) (born 1948), Australian historian and archivist
- Norm Houghton (pioneer irrigator) (died 2014), rice farmer in Australia
