= Leeton District Lands Office =

Australian historic building in Leeton, New South Wales

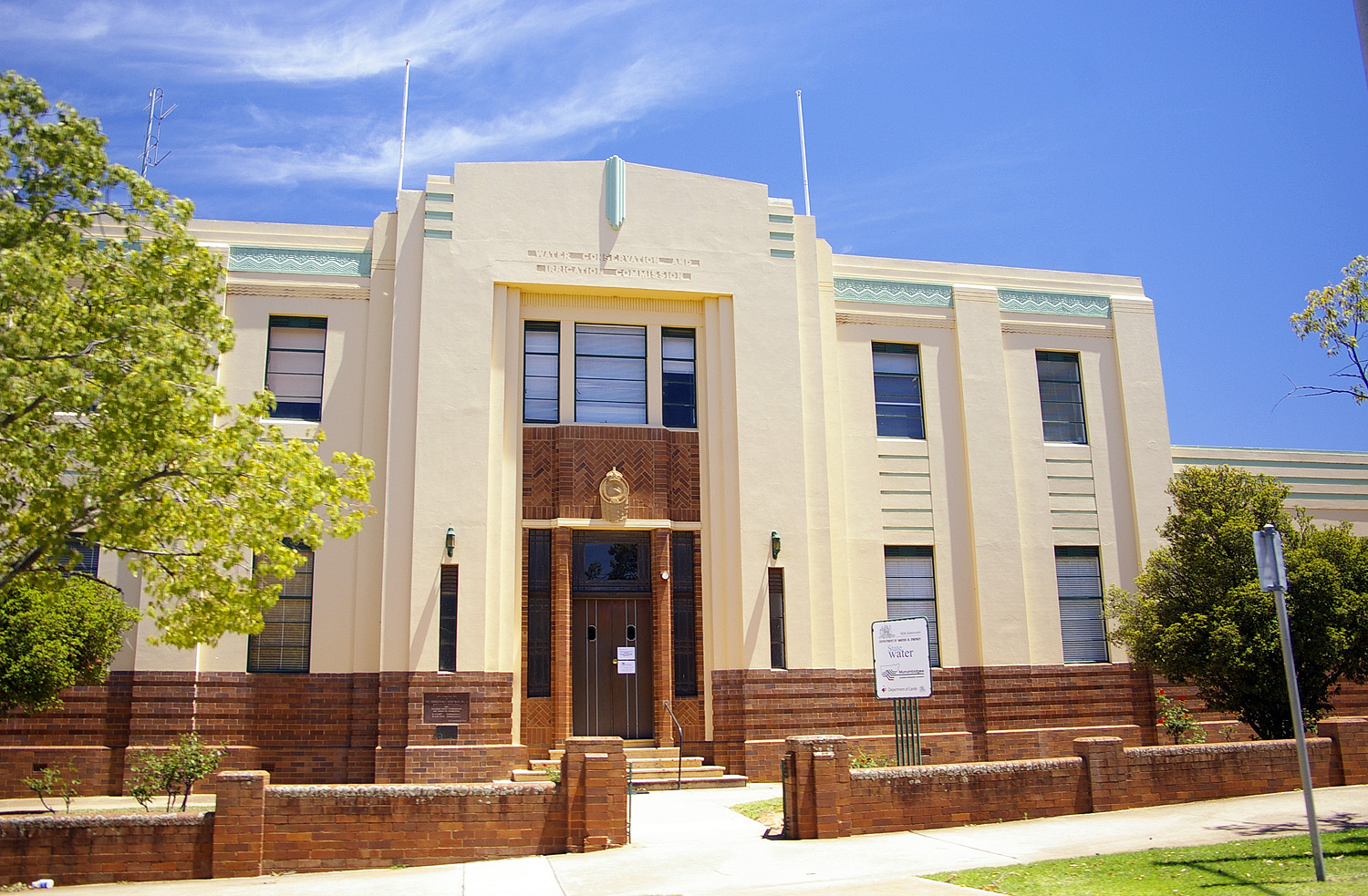
- The former Water Conservation and Irrigation Commission building in December 2008.

- Location within New South Wales Location within Australia
- 34°33′01″S 146°24′23″E
- Location: Chelmsford Place, Leeton, Leeton Shire, New South Wales, Australia

History
- Built: 1937
- Built for: Water Conservation and Irrigation Commission

Site notes
- Architect(s): J. M. S. Woore, Water Conservation and Irrigation Commission
- Architectural style: Art-deco
- Restored: 2019-2020
- Owner: Leeton Shire Council

New South Wales Heritage Register
- Official name: Leeton District Lands Office; WCIC office
- Type: State heritage (built)
- Designated: 2 April 1999
- Reference no.: 965
- Type: Administration Office
- Category: Government and Administration

The Leeton District Lands Office is a heritage-listed administration office at Chelmsford Place, Leeton, within the Leeton Shire local government area of New South Wales, Australia. It was also known as the WCIC office, referencing the Water Conservation and Irrigation Commission. Added to the New South Wales State Heritage Register on 2 April 1999, the property is now owned by Leeton Shire Council.

== History ==
=== Construction and early use (1937–1938) ===
In March 1937, the WCIC sought tenders for the construction of “Office Buildings at Leeton”. Completed in 1938, the building became the Commission's regional offices. The design is attributed to J. M. S. Woore, under Chief Engineer F. Brewster.

The building’s early use relates to irrigation and water management administration in the Murrumbidgee Irrigation Area.

=== Heritage listing ===
The Leeton District Lands Office was listed on the New South Wales State Heritage Register on 2 April 1999. The listing notes its association with the development of Leeton, the administration of the WCIC, and describes it as a valued Art Deco office building in the townscape.

=== Use and Ownership ===
After a new office opened in 2010, no staff remained at the Leeton District Lands Office.

In October 2018, after unsuccessful auctions in 2015 and 2017, the Department of Planning and Infrastructure, a department of the Government of New South Wales, sold the building to Leeton Shire Council for $1.

The building has been restored for cultural use and now houses the Leeton Museum and Art Gallery, with office space for community organisations such as Western Riverina Arts, Miil Miil Productions and the Leeton Family & Local History Society.

== Description ==
Situated opposite the historic Leeton Hydro Hotel, the building exemplifies Art-deco with a symmetrical frontage and a stepped silhouette. It is partly single- and partly two-storey, featuring a basement on the southwest side and a 1980s extension at the northwest corner. The front facade features pronounced vertical piers and horizontal lines, with ornamentation concentrated on the upper portion of the building. The entrance is monumental, incorporating textured brickwork and two sets of ornate double doors. The external windows are metal-framed. Inside, original joinery and decorative detail endure. A central terrazzo staircase leads to the upper floor while rendered walls and ceilings display stylised low-relief motifs typical of the period.

== See also ==
- Leeton District Office artefacts
