= The Irrigator =

Weekly newspaper in Leeton, New South Wales, Australia

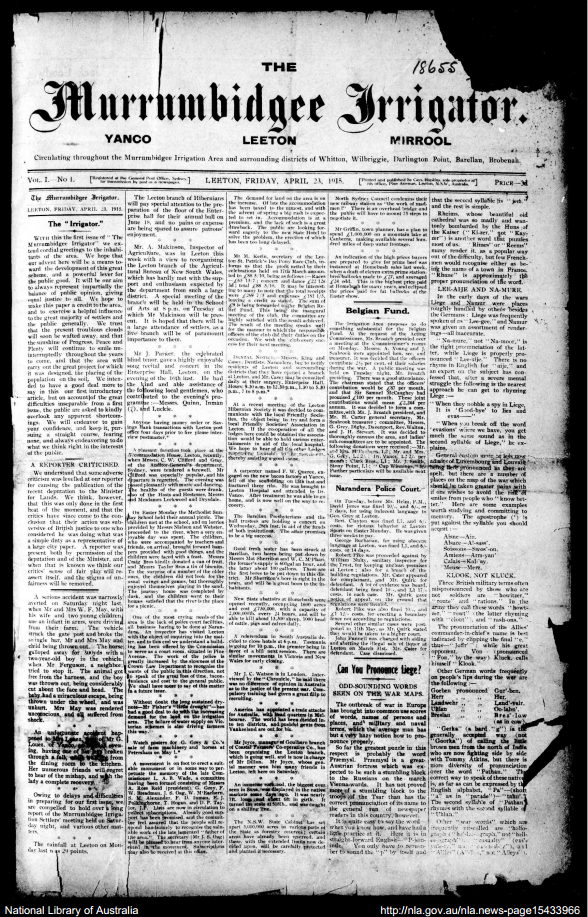
Front page of The Murrumbidgee Irrigator for its first issue on 23 April 1915

The Irrigator, formerly The Murrumbidgee Irrigator, is a weekly newspaper published in Leeton, New South Wales, Australia, since 1915.

== History ==
The Murrumbidgee Irrigator was first published on 23 April 1915 only a few years after the establishment of the town. Its circulation included Barellan, Brobenah, Darlington Point, Leeton, Mirrool, Whitton, Willbriggie, and Yanco. It changed hands a number of times. John Joseph Sullivan owned the paper early in its history, while it was later acquired by Rupert Henderson, who was first general manager of John Fairfax & Sons and later managing director.

In November 2001, it was renamed The Irrigator and remains in publication under this name. In February 2025, Australian Community Media reduced the printed edition to weekly.

== Digitisation ==
The paper has been digitised as part of the Australian Newspapers Digitisation Program of the National Library of Australia.

== See also ==
- Irrigation Record – newspaper published in Leeton, 1913-1917
- List of newspapers in Australia
- List of newspapers in New South Wales
