= Kurt Aylett =

Australian rules footballer (born 1992)

Personal information
- Born: 2 April 1992 (age 34); Leeton, New South Wales
- Original team: Leeton-Whitton (Riverina Football League)
- Height: 189 cm (6 ft 2 in)
- Weight: 77 kg (170 lb)
- Position: Utility

Playing career^{1}
Years	Club	Games (Goals)
2012–2013	Greater Western Sydney	1 (0)
2014–2015	Essendon	2 (0)
2021	Carlton	0 (0)
Total		3 (0)
- ^{1} Playing statistics correct to the end of 2021.

Kurt Aylett (born 2 April 1992) is a former Australian rules footballer who played for the Greater Western Sydney Giants, Essendon Football Club and Carlton Football Club in the Australian Football League (AFL).

He was recruited in mid 2010 by Greater Western Sydney through zoning concessions. Aylett made his AFL debut in round 17, 2012 against Fremantle. In October 2013 he was traded to Essendon along with Shaun Edwards for pick 48. Aylett made his Essendon debut in round 8 of the 2014 and started as the substitute.

Aylett was delisted at the conclusion of the 2014 season, however, he was re-drafted by Essendon in the rookie draft. He was delisted again at the conclusion of the 2015 season. In 2019 he signed for Essendon VFL.

In 2021, Aylett was signed by the Carlton Football Club to its senior list. He did not play an AFL game for the club and subsequently retired from football.
