= Leeton District Office artefacts =

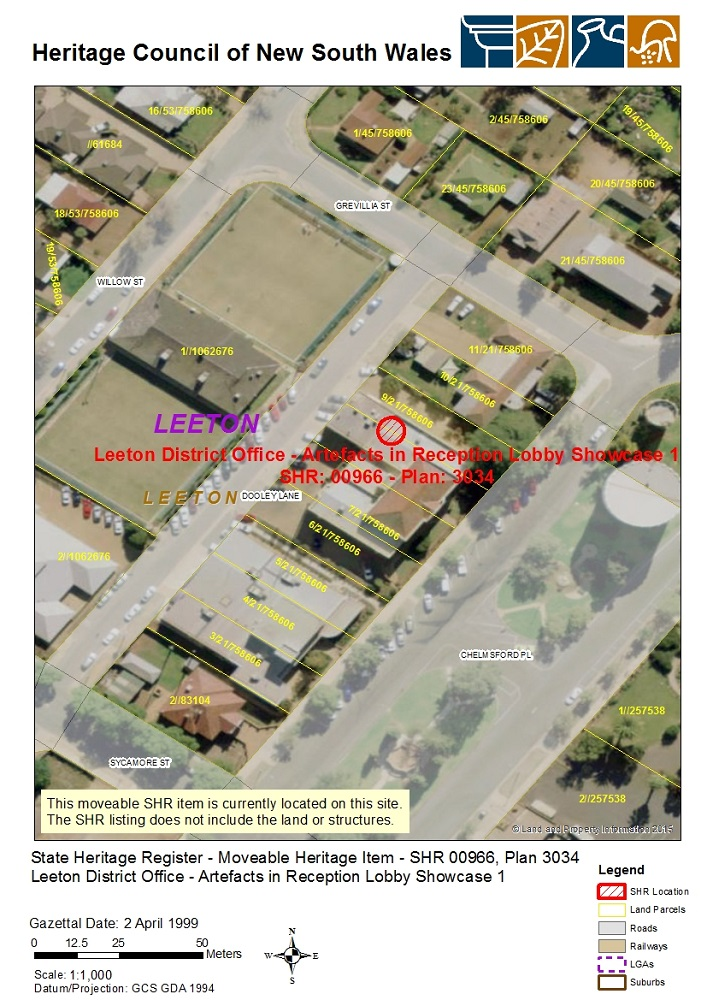
- Heritage boundaries

- Location within New South Wales Location within Australia
- 34°33′01″S 146°24′24″E
- Location: Chelmsford Place, Leeton, Leeton Shire, New South Wales, Australia

Site notes
- Owner: Department of Planning and Infrastructure

New South Wales Heritage Register
- Official name: Leeton District Office - Artefacts in Reception Lobby Showcase 1
- Type: State heritage (movable / collection)
- Designated: 2 April 1999
- Reference no.: 966
- Type: Other - Utilities - Water
- Category: Utilities - Water

The Leeton District Office artefacts is a heritage-listed collection of artefacts at a waterworks at Chelmsford Place, Leeton in the Leeton Shire local government area of New South Wales, Australia. It is also known as Leeton District Office - Artefacts in Reception Lobby Showcase 1. The property is owned by Department of Planning and Infrastructure, an agency of the Government of New South Wales. It was added to the New South Wales State Heritage Register on 2 April 1999.

== History ==
The artefacts in Showcase No. 1 consist of objects which are associated with the Murrumbidgee Irrigation Scheme, the Water Conservation and Irrigation Commission (WC&IC), and history of the local community. The artefacts include working model used in the planning and construction of the Berembed Weir, and examples of items produced or manufactured locally under Water Conservation & Irrigation Commission, such as bottle fruit can and fruit can labels. The WC & IC Cannery at Leeton and Yanco started production in 1914 and the produce was marketed until 1935 when the cannery was transferred to Leeton Co-operative Cannery Ltd.

== Description ==
The items in Showcase 1 fall into two groups: objects and documents. They include:

- Collapsible Wickets Model: a cast brass model on a timber base demonstrating how the wickets at Berembed Weir functioned.
- Bottle: a clear glass bottle with inscription "THIS BOTTLE ALWAYS REMAINS THE PROPERTY OF THE WATER CONSERVATION AND IRRIGATION COMMISSION N.S.WALES".
- Dethbridge Wheelcounter, x 2: meters used for measuring the quantity of water entering a property.
- Cigarettes Tin: an old tin box with label "CAPSTAN" Navy Cut Cigarettes, W.D. & H.O. Wills (Australia) Ltd. Sydney.
- Fruit Can: A tin used for canned fruit from the WC & IC Cannery at Leeton and Yanco. It is not known where this can was produced or used but it comes from the site of Leeton Cannery which is now closed (1996).
- Fruit Can Labels: Printed paper labels with identifiable brand names used to market canned fruit from the WC & IC Cannery at Leeton and Yanco. The labels displayed included "MELBA" Canned Plums, "OCNAY" Bartlett Pears, "HYDRO" Apricots, "IBIS" Canned Plums.

=== Further information ===
The provenance and ownership of the collection needs to be ascertained. Paper elements should be encapsulated in Mylar sleeves. The corroded fruit can requires urgent conservation.

== Heritage listing ==
As at 11 December 2000, the artefacts are relics of the period during the planning and construction of the Murrumbidgee Irrigation Scheme. The locally produced items are representatives of the period under the control of the Water Conservation & Irrigation Commission. (DLWC S170 Register)

Leeton District Office artefacts was listed on the New South Wales State Heritage Register on 2 April 1999.

== See also ==
- Leeton District Lands Office
