= Koonadan Historic Site =

- Location within New South Wales
- Location: New South Wales
- Nearest city: Leeton
- Coordinates: 34°29′47.8″S 146°21′43.2″E
- Area: 0.22 km^{2} (0.085 sq mi)
- Established: November 1983
- Governing body: NSW National Parks & Wildlife Service
- Website: Official website

Koonadan Historic Site is a Wiradjuri ceremonial and burial grounds, and designated Aboriginal Place, located 9 km northwest of Leeton, New South Wales. The site has a picnic shelter with signs that tell the story of the site, with artwork by local Aboriginal people.

== Overview ==
Prior to European colonisation of Australia and the encroachment of settlers into Wiradjuri lands, the Koonadan lunette dune served as a hunting and fishing ground for Wiradjuri people due to its location next to Tuckerbil Swamp. A bora ground was also located between the Koonadan dune and Tuckerbil Swamp, but evidence of it has been erased by changes in land use. In the late 19th century, many Wiradjuri were removed from the Koonadan area to Warangesda and Euabalong, not returning until the gradual closing of missions and Aboriginal reserves between the mid-1920s to 1950s, when many settled in Leeton and Narrandera.

After the 1950s, the site was cleared of trees, and Tuckerbil Swamp was drained, which has greatly diminished the areas food resources.

In the early 1980s, sand mining of the Koonadan dune unearthed skeletal remains associated with two different skeletons, which were then reburied by the local Aboriginal community. The recommencement of sand mining led to protests and blockading of the site by the local Wiradjuri community, leading to the end of sand mining at Koonadan. An agreement between the landholder and NSW government saw the eventual purchase of the southern part of the Koonadan dune, which was then declared an 'Aboriginal place' under the NSW National Parks and Wildlife Act.
