= ABC Riverina =

Coordinates: 35.105147°S 147.369093°E

- Australia
- Broadcast area: Riverina and Murrumbidgee Irrigation Area
- Frequencies: 675 kHz AM Riverina; 89.9 mHz FM East Riverina; 100.5 mHz FM Grifith and MIA; 102.7 mHz FM Wagga Wagga

Programming
- Format: Talk

Ownership
- Owner: Australian Broadcasting Corporation

History
- First air date: 16 December 1931

Links
- Website: https://www.abc.net.au/riverina/

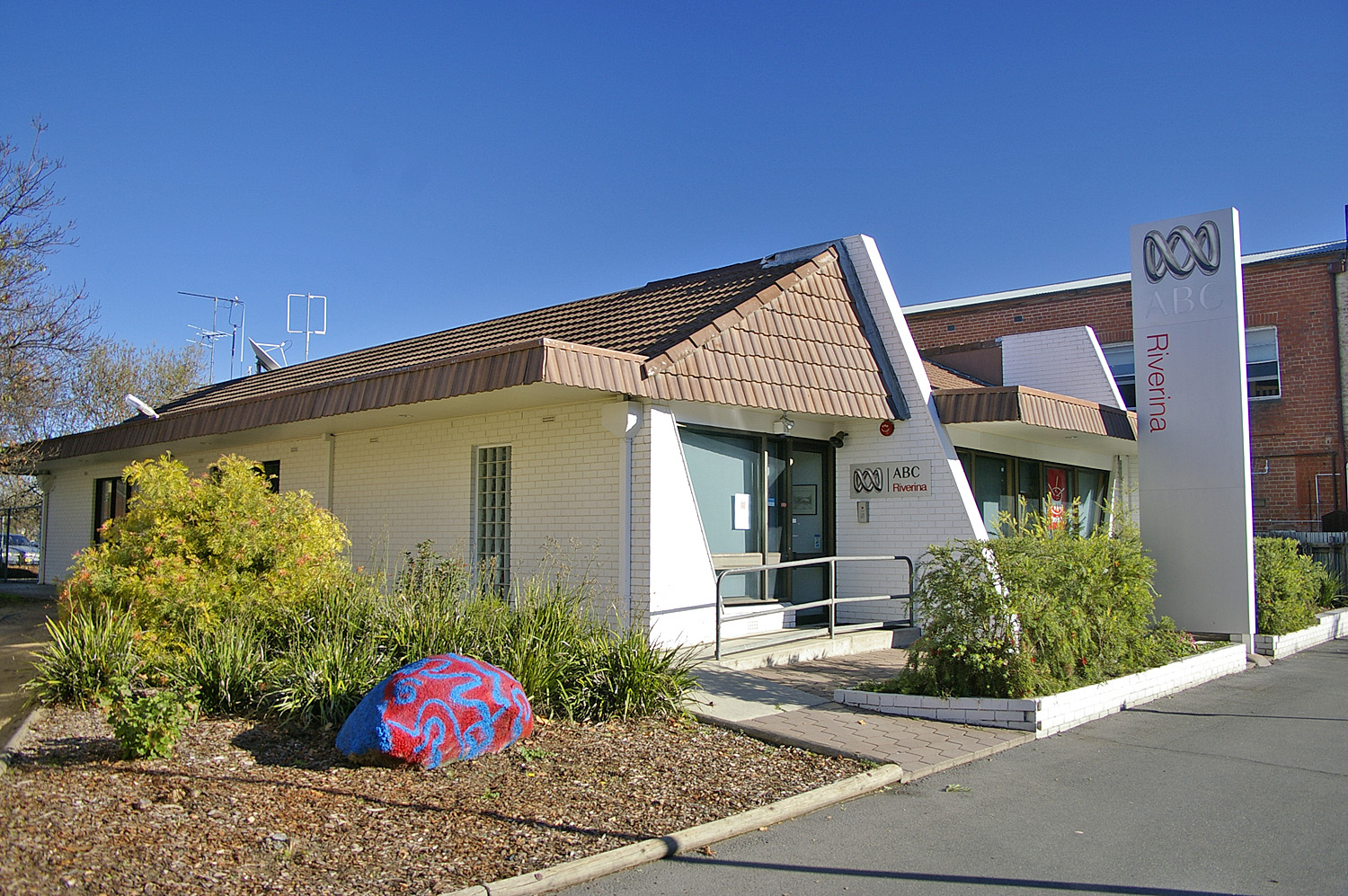
ABC Riverina studios.

ABC Riverina is an ABC Local Radio station based in Wagga Wagga and broadcasting to the Riverina and Murrumbidgee Irrigation Area regions in New South Wales. This includes the towns and cities of Griffith, Leeton and Hay.

The station began as 2CO in 1931, originally based in Albury, broadcasting from an AM transmission mast on the outskirts of Corowa, covering south-west New South Wales and north-east Victoria. The station operated only as an opt-out service in Wagga Wagga until 1987. New studios and transmitters were opened and the region was split into two. 2CO was reoriented to serve the Riverina region, while the Albury-based station moved to Wodonga and became 3MRR, now ABC Goulburn Murray.

The transmitter originally installed at 2CO was a STC 6.5/7 kW model manufactured in Sydney from imported components. The final output stage had a pair of water-cooled 4220-B triodes. These needed a 12,000 volt supply. This was driven by a pair of type 4015-A triode valves cooled by air. The power supply for this was only 5,000 volts. The power supply was three phase using three 4222-A vacuum diodes also water-cooled. The water cooling was at a rate of 37 litres per minute and had a 450-litre tank and heat exchanger outside the building.

The station is heard on these main AM and FM frequencies along with a number of low-power FM repeaters:

- 2CO 675 AM
- 2RVR 89.9, 100.5 and 102.7 FM

During Australian rules football and rugby football season, the station offers a split service, with AFL games airing on the main transmitter and NRL and Super Rugby games airing on the FM repeaters. This decision was made because ABC Riverina's service territory is split by the Barassi Line, which separates the traditional centres for Australian rules football and rugby.

== See also ==
- List of radio stations in Australia
