= Gogeldrie, New South Wales =

Gogeldrie New South Wales
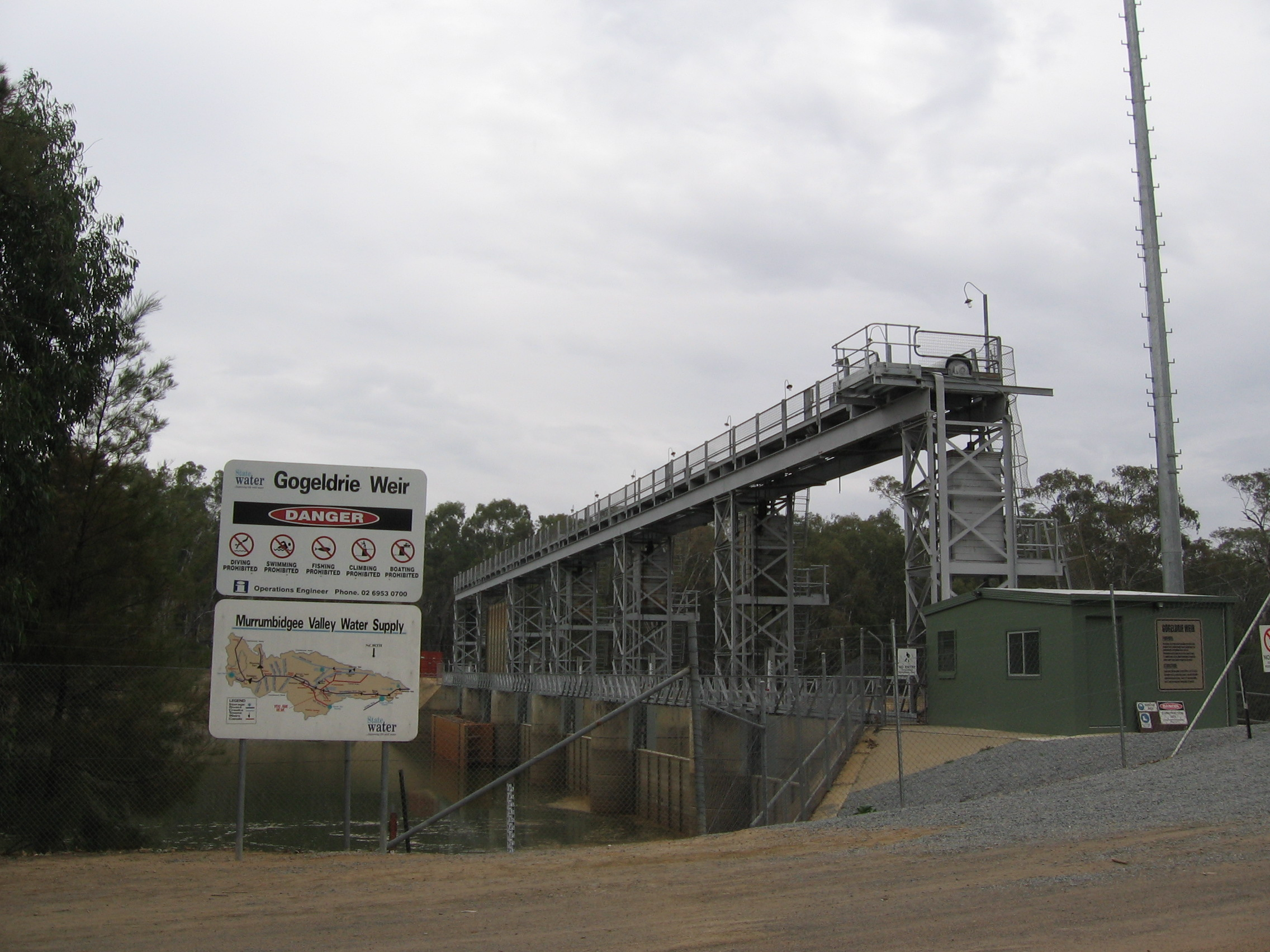
- Gogeldrie Weir

- Coordinates: 34°33′20″S 146°16′58″E
- Population: 65 (2021 census)
- Postcode(s): 2705
- Elevation: 148 m (486 ft)
- Location: 11 km (7 mi) from Leeton; 11 km (7 mi) from Whitton
- LGA(s): Leeton Shire
- County: Cooper
- State electorate(s): Murray
- Federal division(s): Farrer

Gogeldrie is a town community in the central north part of the Riverina and situated about 11 kilometres west of Leeton and 11 kilometres east of Whitton. At the 2021 census, Gogeldrie had a population of 65 people.

Gogeldrie Post Office opened on 15 May 1933 and closed in 1945.

== Notes and references ==
Preceding station	Former services	Following station
Whitton towards Hay	Hay Line	Yanco towards Junee
