= SunRice =

Australian public company

- Company type: Public
- Traded as: ASX: SGLLV
- Industry: Food and Beverage Manufacturing
- Founded: 1950
- Founder: NSW Rice farmers
- Headquarters: Leeton, Australia
- Key people: Laurie Arthur, (Chairman); Paul Serra, (CEO)
- Products: Bulk Rice, Rice Products
- Revenue: $1.9 billion (2024)
- Net income: $69 million (2024)
- Number of employees: 2,139 (April 2024)
- Website: www.sunrice.com.au

SunRice is one of the largest rice food companies in the world and one of Australia's leading branded food exporters.

The SunRice Group comprises multiple businesses, assets and operations across Australia, New Zealand, the Middle East, the United States, the Pacific Islands and Asia. It has around 35 major brands in approximately 50 global markets and employs over 2,000 people.

Australian rice production is based in regional southern New South Wales. The company's head office is located in Leeton (with a corporate office also in Sydney), and it has rice mills in Leeton, Deniliquin, and Coleambally. SunRice also operates stockfeed plants in Leeton, Tongala and Cobden.

In 2020, its CopRice business converted the Coleambally Mill into a ruminant feed mill, the largest of its kind in Australia.

Today, the SunRice Group has operations across Australia, the United States, Singapore, United Arab Emirates, New Zealand, Solomon Islands, Japan, Jordan, Vietnam and Papua New Guinea.

== Products ==
SunRice manufactures more than 700 products - from table rice and rice flour, snacks and rice meals, to companion animal and livestock products.

Around 80% of the Australian crop is exported as branded product in an average year to key markets including Asia, the Pacific and the Middle East.

During the 2017 financial year, the Company experienced significant market share growth in the domestic Australian snack foods sector due to increasing sales of microwave rice meals.

To complement its Australian operations to ensure reliability of supply in low crop years, while enabling Riverina growers to focus on premium varieties that provide higher farm-gate returns, SunRice is establishing sustainable and secure global sourcing and supply chains. In 2016/17, SunRice sourced 320,000 paddy tonnes from Vietnam and has opened a representative office in the country.

== Business units and brands ==
=== CopRice ===
CopRice has been supplying animal feed for over 30 years through its plants in Leeton, Tongala and Cobden. The CopRice business was originally established in response to the availability of rice by-products, such as rice pollard: a feed which is high in energy and protein. Rice now represents only one of the many ingredients used by CopRice. CopRice also operates a pet food business.

=== Riviana Foods ===
Riviana Foods is a gourmet food distribution, sales and marketing company owned by SunRice. It has the largest share of olives and pickled vegetables in the retail channel in Australia. In its grocery business, important brands include Always Fresh, Felhbergs, Admiral, Captain, Riviana and Mahatma. Riviana Foods also has a strong presence in the food service sector and an extensive portfolio of brands including Riviana, Menu Master, Garden Supreme and Ocean Supreme.

=== Trukai Industries ===
Trukai is a rice product packaging, distribution, sales and marketing company that is two-thirds owned by SunRice, with the remaining interest held by the people of Papua New Guinea through the Pacific Balanced Fund.

Registered in 1970 by SunRice, Trukai has a number of well-established brands including Trukai and Roots Rice. Trukai's head office and processing base is located in Lae, with a marketing office in Port Moresby and distribution facilities located throughout Papua New Guinea. Trukai employs over 1,000 people throughout the country.

=== SolRice ===
Solrice, located in the Solomon Islands, is a distribution, sales and marketing company wholly owned by SunRice.

=== SunFoods ===
SunFoods is a rice milling, distribution and marketing company that was established in 2008 and now owned by SunRice. SunFoods is the owner of the Hinode brand, which was created by the California based Rice Growers Association in the 1930s. The Hinode brand is very strong in medium-grain rice markets throughout the US, and is stocked in retail outlets including Walmart, WinCo Foods Stores and Kruger. SunFoods’ head office and milling base is located in Woodland, California.

=== AGS ===
SunRice's wholly owned subsidiary AGS owns and operates Riverina-based grain storage infrastructure with capacity exceeding one million tonnes.

=== RRAPL ===
Rice Research Australia Pty Ltd (RRAPL), a wholly owned subsidiary of SunRice, undertakes rice varietal and agronomic research and development in partnership with the NSW Department of Primary Industries and the Rural Industries Research and Development Corporation. RRAPL operates a leased farm in the Riverina for its activities.
