= Fivebough and Tuckerbil Wetlands =

Wetland sites in New South Wales, Australia

Designations

Ramsar Wetland
- Official name: Fivebough and Tuckerbil Swamps
- Designated: 21 October 2002
- Reference no.: 1224

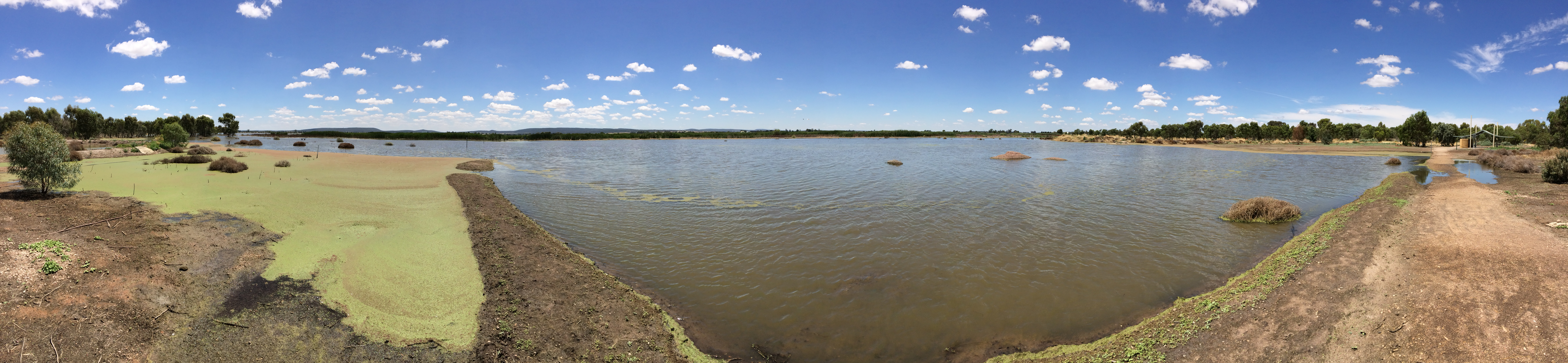
Panorama from Wetlands Walk at Fivebough Wetlands, which is still underwater after the wet Winter and Spring in 2016

Fivebough and Tuckerbil Wetlands are two wetland sites within the Riverina and Murrumbidgee Irrigation Area (MIA), near Leeton in New South Wales, Australia. Both Fivebough and Tuckerbil sites form Crown reserve number 1030008 managed by NSW Department of Industry, for ecological conservation and public recreation. The reserve was recognised as being a Wetland of International Importance through designation under the Ramsar Convention on 21 October 2002 as Ramsar Site 1224

== Description ==
Fivebough Wetlands (34°31′50″S 146°25′55″E) lies 4 km north-east of Leeton. It has an area of 400 ha, is a seasonal, shallow, fresh to brackish wetland in its east and north-west, with permanent water in the south-west of its basin.

Tuckerbil Wetlands (34°29′05″S 146°20′55″E) lies 10 km north-west of Leeton and is a 289 ha seasonal, shallow, brackish to saline wetland.

== History ==
Fivebough and Tuckerbil Wetlands were recognised for their environmental values as early as 1920 when ornithologist Samuel Albert White reported to the MIA Commissioner that Fivebough Swamp should be proclaimed a sanctuary, and Tuckerbil Swamp a reserve. Keith Collingwood McKeown (1892-1952) entomologist, naturalist, and author, during his time in Leeton (1915-1921) recorded the first bird observations (acknowledged in S. A. White's reports) in Leeton and the Murrumbidgee Irrigation Area, including Fivebough and Tuckerbil Wetlands. McKeown later became assistant curator entomology (1929-1952) at the Australian Museum. In the late 1970s Fivebough Swamp, along with Tuckerbil swamp during the 1990s, became known for their birdwatching qualities. During 1994-1997 both Fivebough and Tuckerbil Wetlands using set methodology were surveyed as part of the RAOU (Birds Australia) Murray-Darling Basin Waterbird Project. The results from the project identifying the wetlands as qualifying under five of the nine Ramsar Convention criteria as Wetlands of International Importance, based on waterbird species diversity, populations, and nationally threatened species. From September 1997 to January 1998 the wetlands were managed by a sub committee of the Murrumbidgee Field Naturalists under the direction of the NSW Department of Land and Water Conservation after which time, a formal management committee was appointed by the NSW Department of Land and Water Conservation. This management committee in 2000 became the Fivebough and Tuckerbil Wetlands Management Trust. The Trust developed, 2001–2002, in consultation with the Leeton community and others the nomination of Fivebough and Tuckerbil Wetlands as a Wetland of International Importance and submitted it to the NSW State and Commonwealth Governments May 29, 2002, together with a comprehensive plan of management for the wetlands. Amongst the objectives of the plan of management are waterbird conservation, education and eco-tourism, with acknowledgment and respect for the cultural significance of the wetlands to the local Wiradjuri people.

== Ramsar values ==
The wetlands were recognised as being of international importance because of the presence, abundance and diversity of their waterbirds, including migratory waders and threatened species. Both wetlands act as waterbird habitat and refuge within an agricultural landscape, gaining some of their habitat values from human uses of the site, such as livestock grazing, flood mitigation and sewage treatment.

== Birds ==
Some of the land covered by the two wetlands has been identified by BirdLife International as a 328 ha Important Bird Area because it supports significant numbers of the endangered Australasian bittern and over 1% of the world populations of glossy ibis and sharp-tailed sandpiper. The wetlands also provide habitat for the Australian painted snipe and Tuckerbil serves as an important flocking area for brolgas.
