= Vance Industrial Estate =

Vance Estate is a large industrial subdivision located in Leeton, New South Wales. The estate houses both large and small businesses including:

- Leetoria
- Southern Central Engineering
- Hi-Marq Engineering
- Market Express
- Teerman's Transport
- Leeton Shire Council Depot
- Celair Malmet
- Riverina Cheese

In late 2016, the area was connected to high speed broadband via the National Broadband Network.

The estate has doubled its size in recent years to increase capacity. It is located on the western approach from Griffith. There are entrances off both Wamoon Ave (Irrigation Way) and Vance Road.
