= Hydro Hotel =

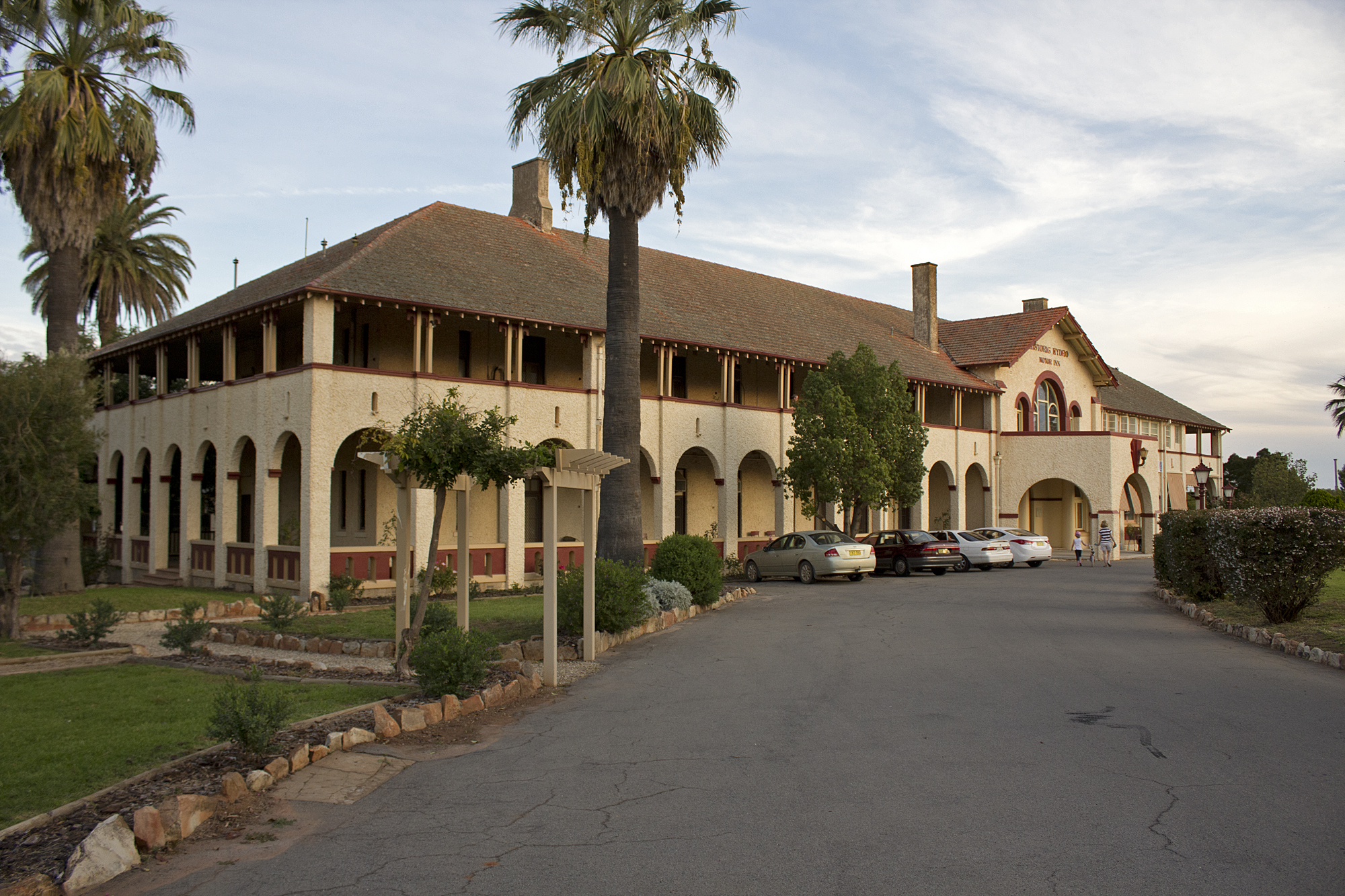
- Hydro Hotel, pictured in 2012.

- Location within New South Wales Location within Australia
- 34°33′03″S 146°24′27″E
- Location: Chelmsford Place, Leeton, Leeton Shire, New South Wales, Australia

New South Wales Heritage Register
- Official name: Hydro Hotel
- Type: State heritage (built)
- Designated: 2 April 1999
- Reference no.: 247
- Type: Hotel
- Category: Commercial

The Hydro Hotel is a heritage-listed hotel located at Chelmsford Place, Leeton in the Riverina region of New South Wales, Australia. It was added to the New South Wales State Heritage Register on 2 April 1999.

== History ==
The Hydro Hotel was completed on 28 August 1919, initially serving as accommodation for senior personnel involved in developing the Murrumbidgee Irrigation Area (MIA). It expanded and gained a licence in 1924 following the repeal of prohibition in the MIA. Originally designed by government architect Mr Whitcomb, but, due to its planning and use of unsatisfactory materials, it was then redesigned by George McRae with the assistance of Gorrie McLeish Blair. Built by the contractor Andrew Eaton at the highest point in the centre of town, the hotel stands as a significant Leeton landmark. The hotel's history is intertwined with the broader development of the MIA, a major agricultural initiative inspired by Sir Samuel McCaughey and executed through extensive government-supported irrigation schemes.

== Heritage listing ==
Hydro Hotel was listed on the New South Wales State Heritage Register on 2 April 1999.

== Gallery ==
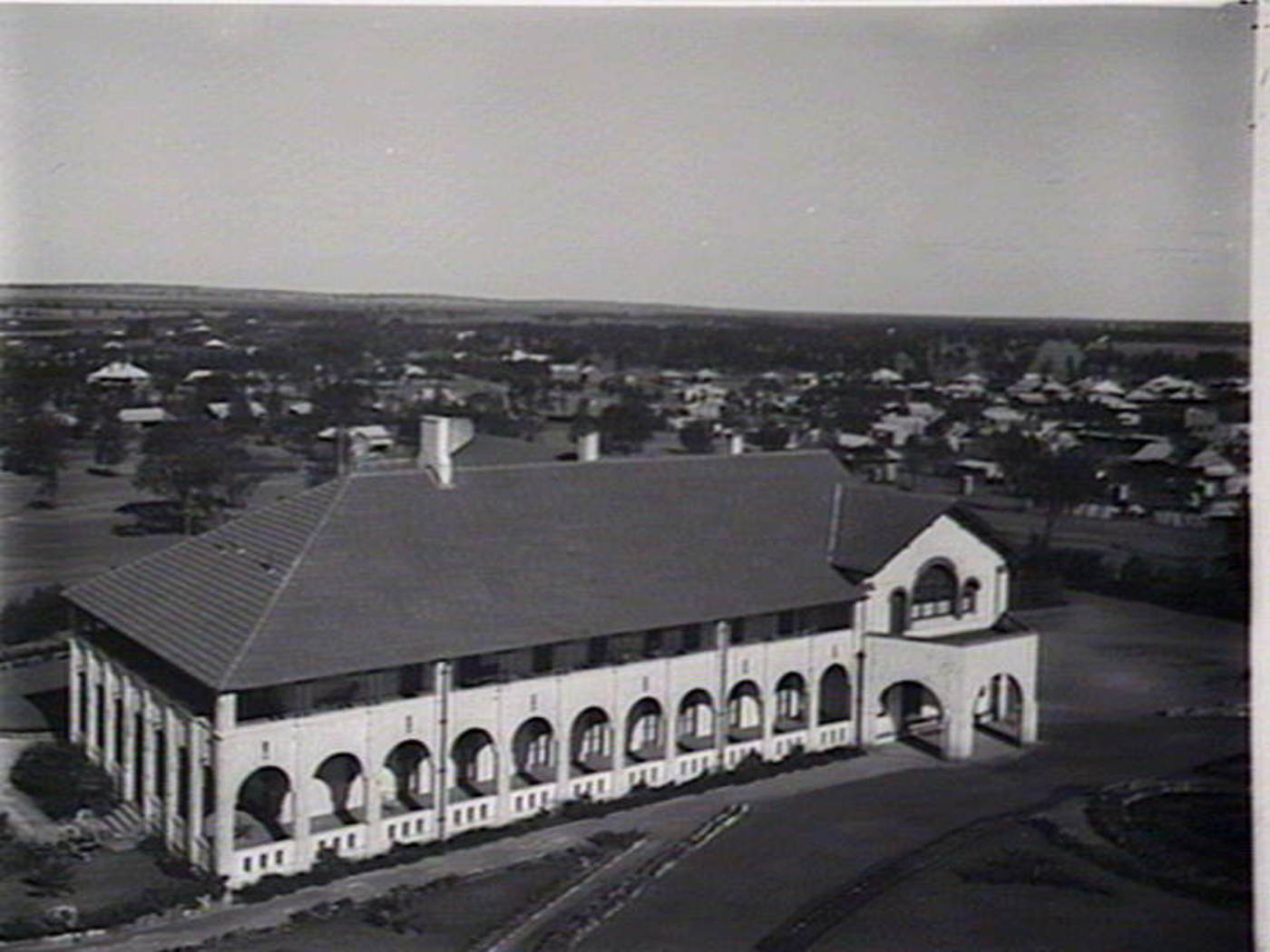
Hydro Hotel circa 1920s (soon after opening and before completion of wing)

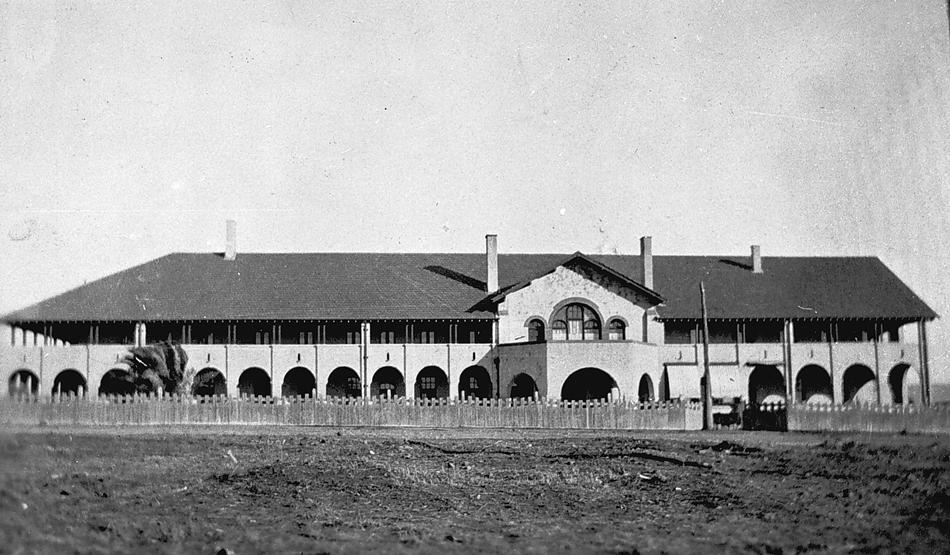
Hydro Hotel in 1925

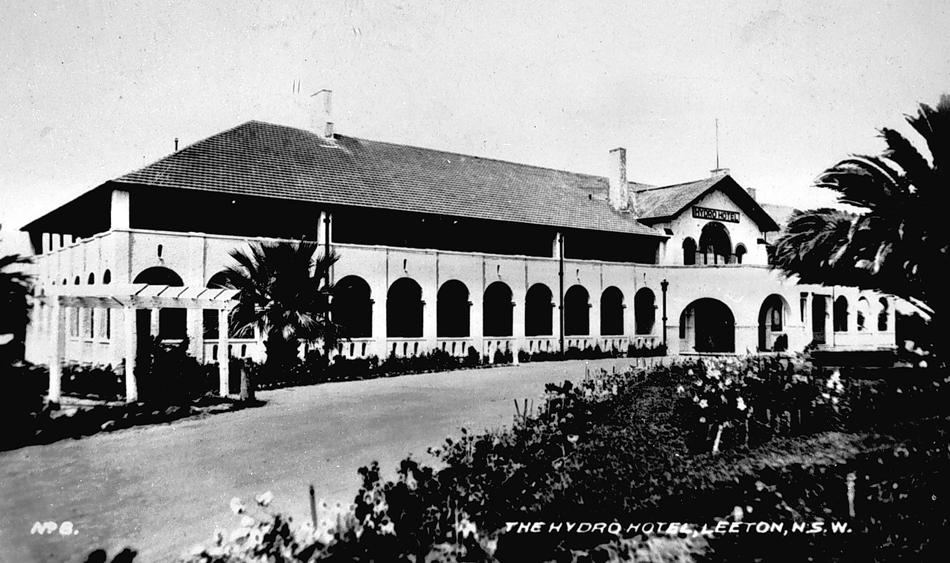
Hydro Hotel in 1936

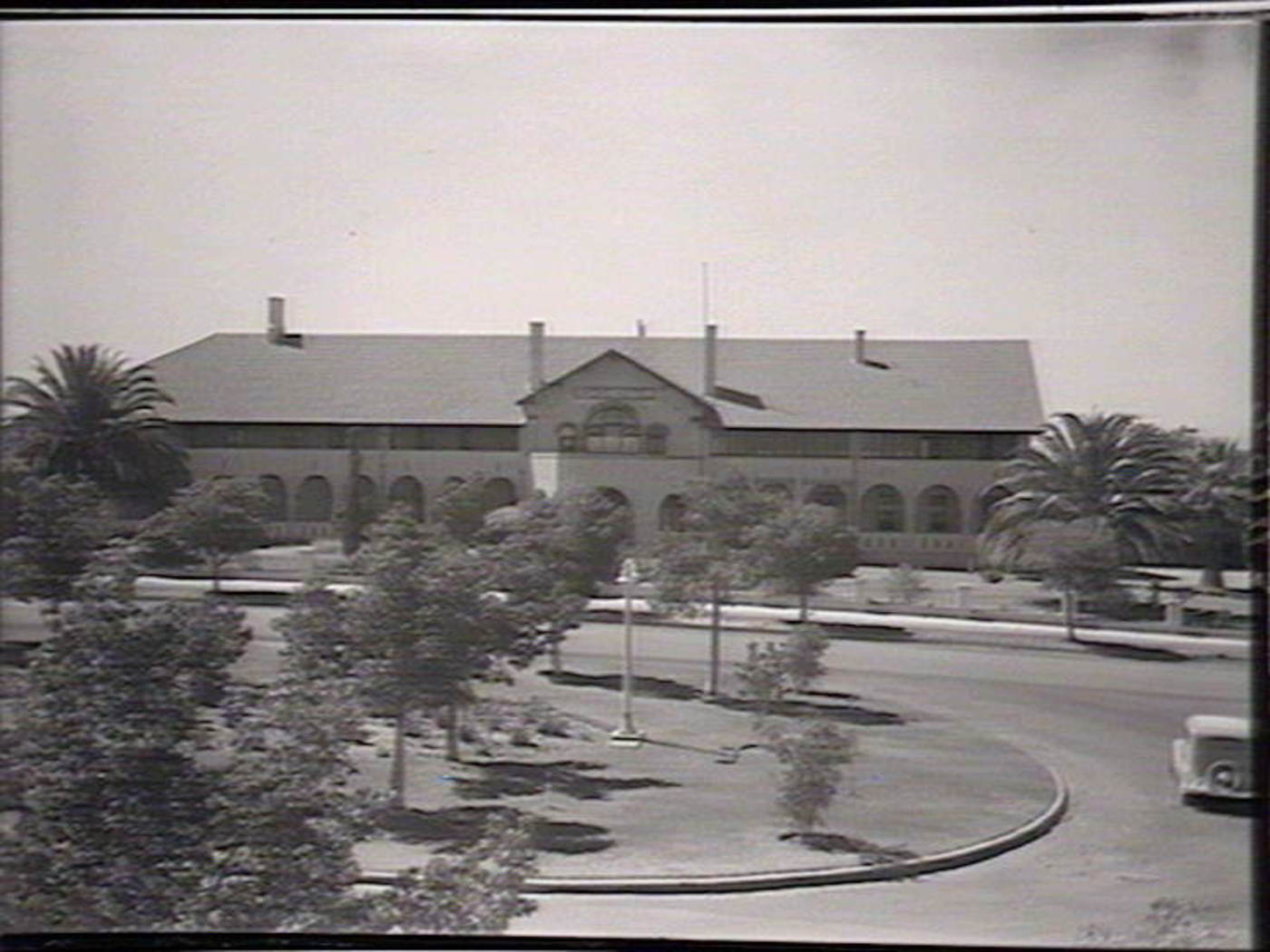
Chelmsford Place and Hydro Hotel in 1946

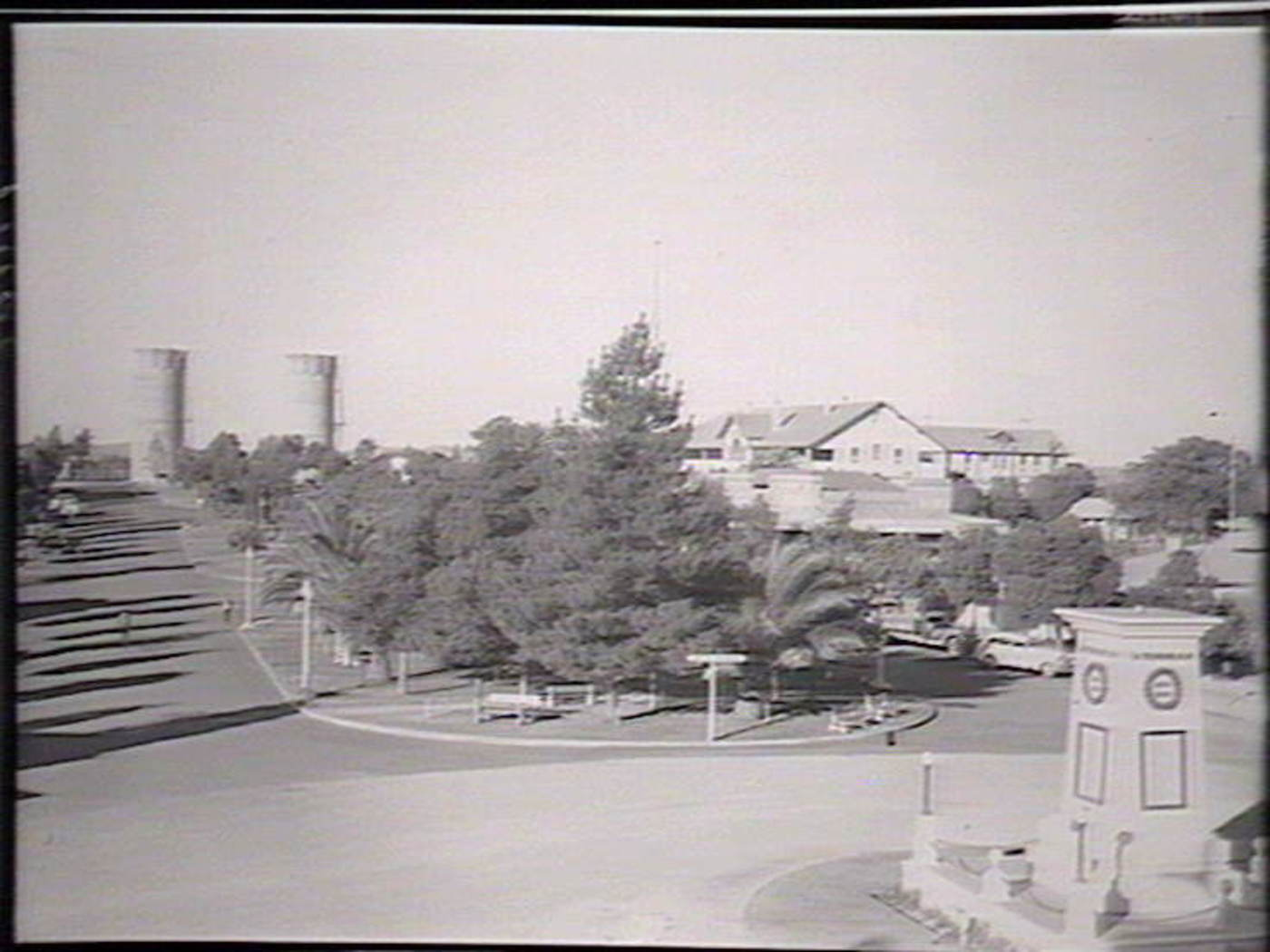
Chelmsford Place and War Memorial in 1946 (with Hydro Hotel in the background)

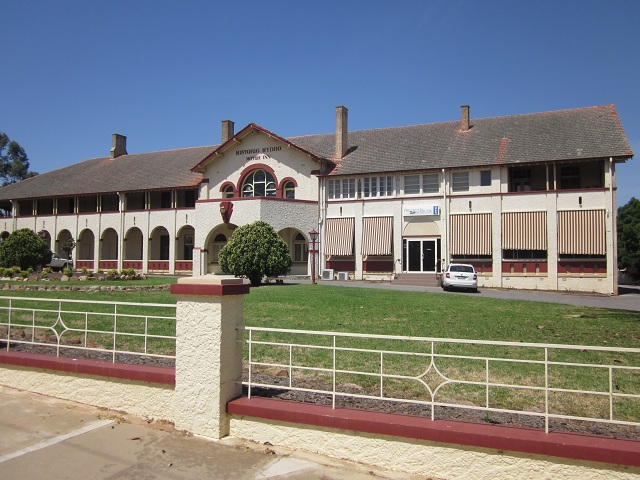
Hydro Hotel 2019

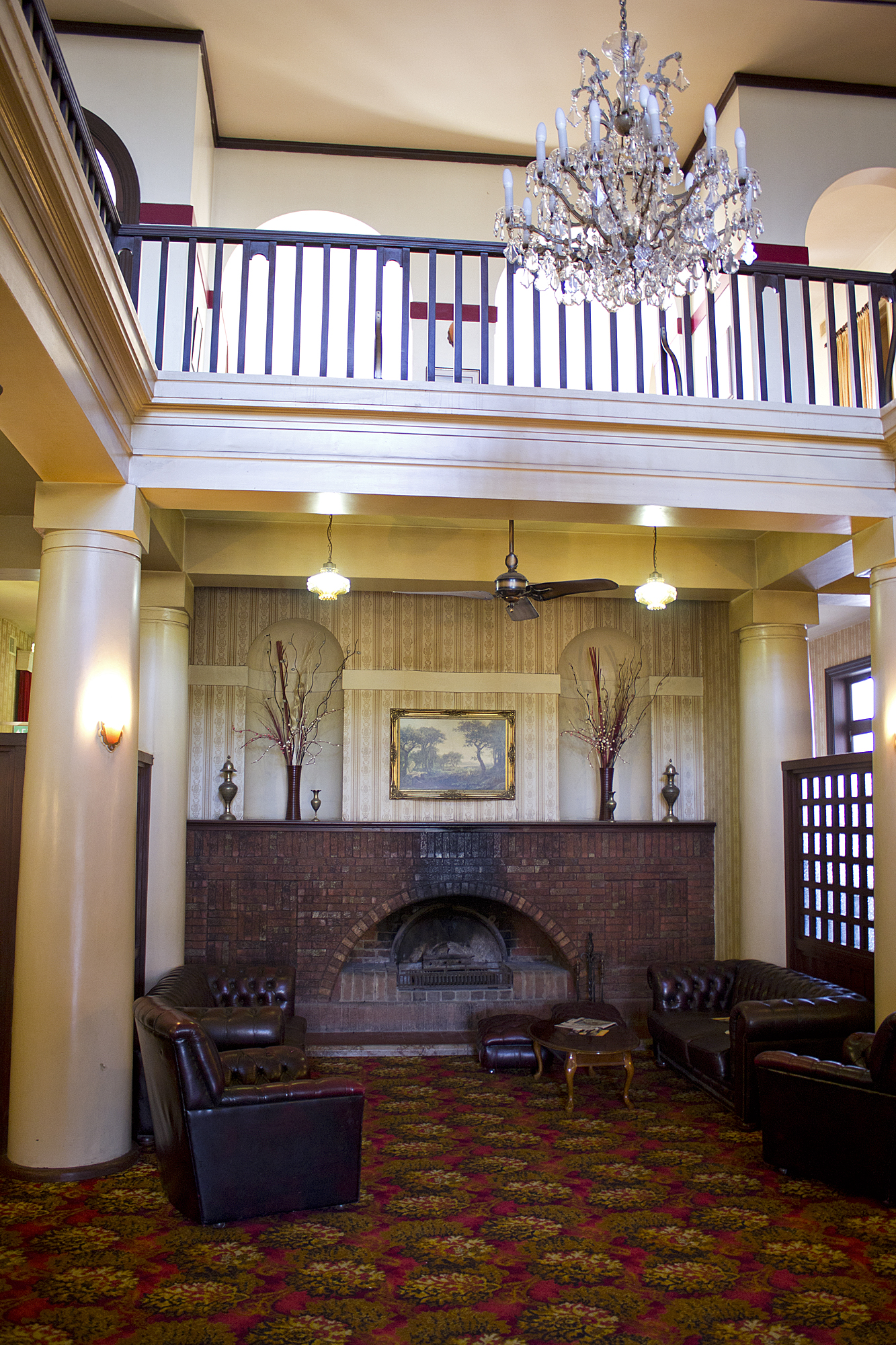
Historic Hydro foyer 2012

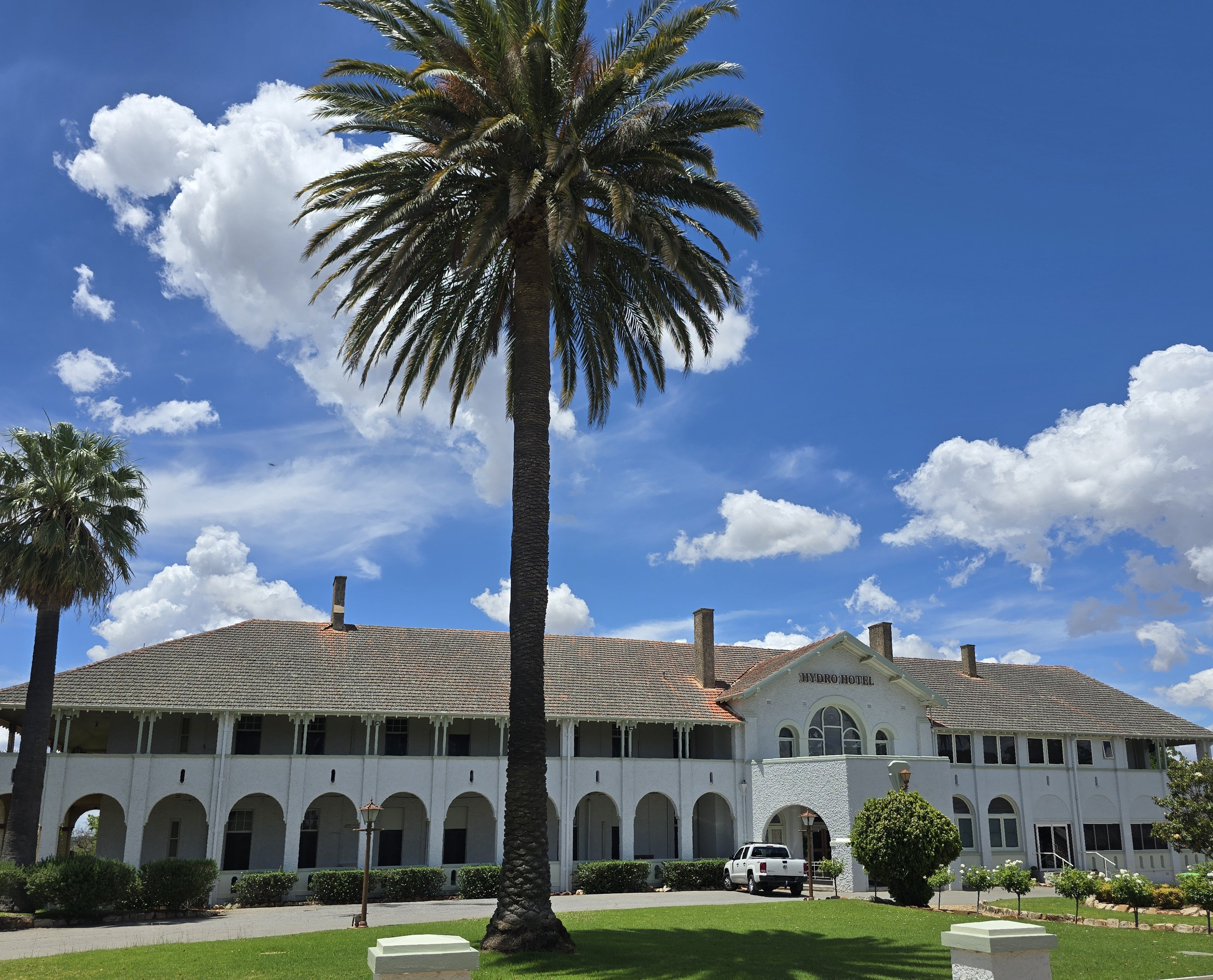
Hydro Hotel in December 2024
