= Leeton, New South Wales =

Leeton
- Town
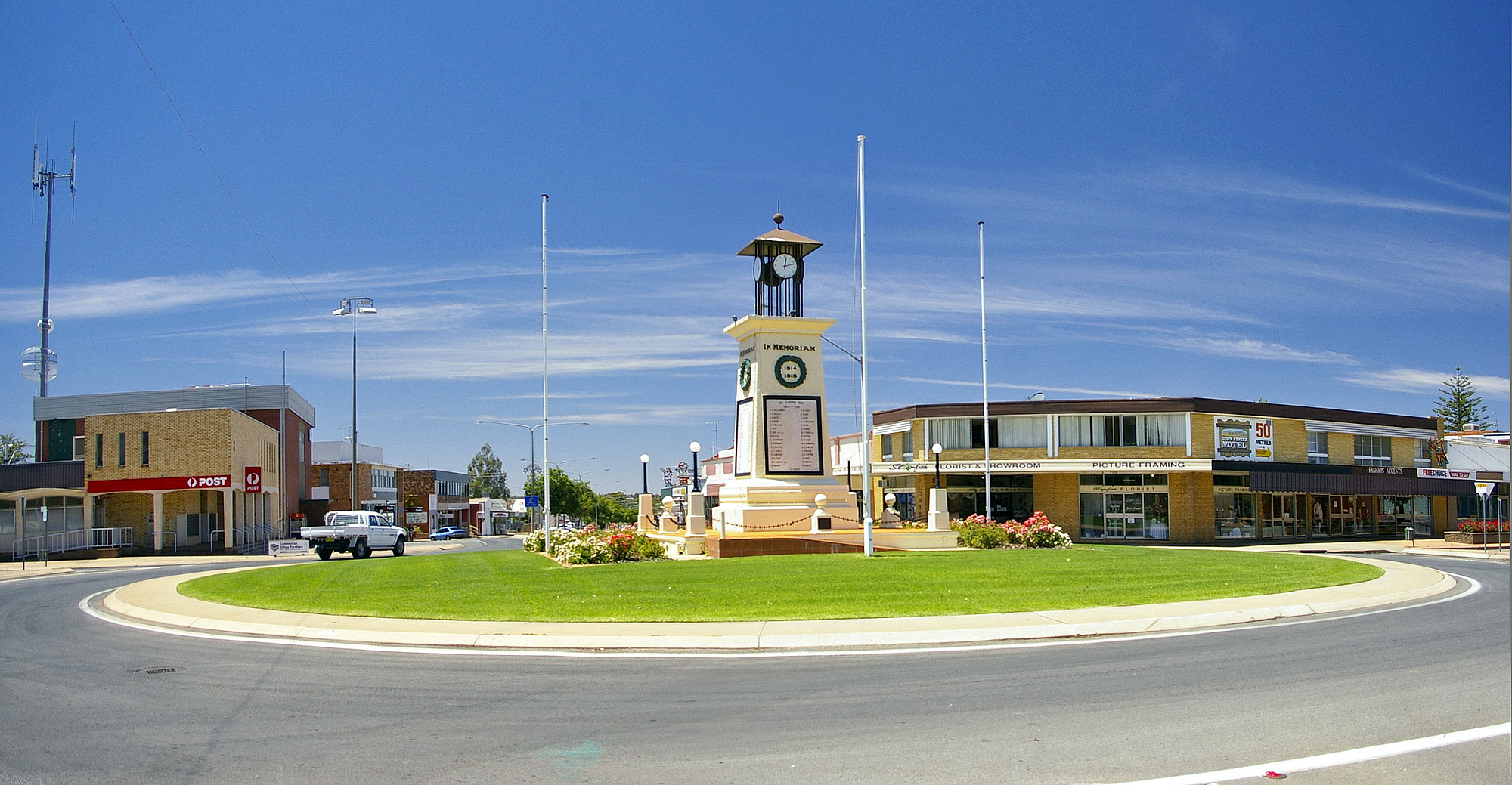
- Leeton War Memorial

- Coordinates: 34°34′0″S 146°24′0″E
- Country: Australia
- State: New South Wales
- LGA: Leeton Shire
- Location: 579 km (360 mi) from Sydney; 457 km (284 mi) from Melbourne; 369 km (229 mi) from Canberra; 129 km (80 mi) from Wagga Wagga
- Established: 2 April 1913

Government
  - State electorate: Murray
  - Federal division: Farrer
- Elevation: 138.3 m (454 ft)

Population
  - Total: 7,437 (2021 census)
- Postcode: 2705
- County: Cooper
- Parish: Willimbong
- Mean max temp: 23.0 °C (73.4 °F)
- Mean min temp: 10.3 °C (50.5 °F)
- Annual rainfall: 432.0 mm (17.01 in)

Leeton is a town in the Riverina region of New South Wales, Australia. It is situated in the Murrumbidgee Irrigation Area. It is the administrative centre of the Leeton Shire Council local government area, which includes neighbouring suburbs, towns and localities such as Yanco, Wamoon, Whitton, Gogeldrie, Stanbridge and Murrami.

The town was designed by Walter Burley Griffin and built for the New South Wales government early 20th century irrigation schemes. Leeton is home to citrus, rice, cotton, grape, walnut, and wheat farming. It is known as Australia's Rice Capital, as well as The Heart of SunRice Country, as it is home to the headquarters of SunRice corporation, one of Australia's largest food exporters. Other industry includes Arnott's Biscuits (previously Freedom Foods), Webster Limited, and Murrumbidgee Irrigation Limited.

== History ==
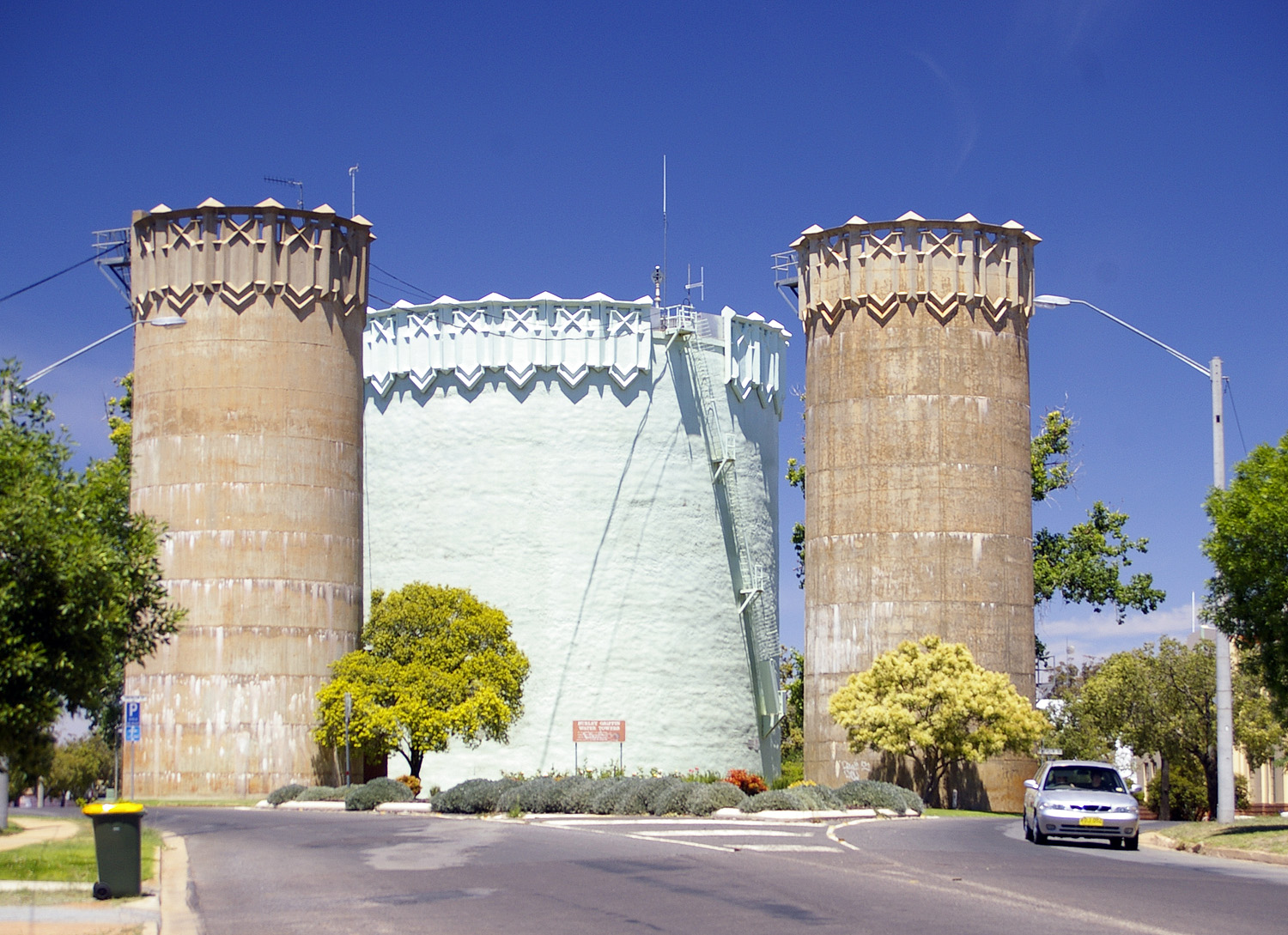
Burley Griffin Water Towers

Prior to European colonisation, the area was inhabited by the Wiradjuri people. The town is named after Charles Alfred Lee, a Minister for Public Works in New South Wales from 1904 to 1910.

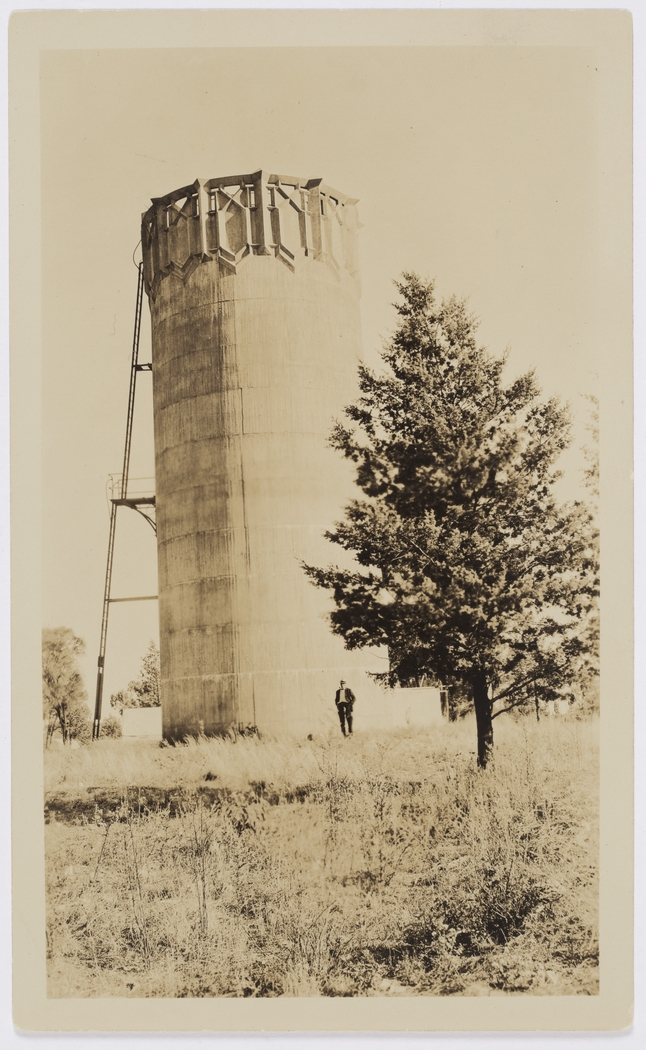
Single Burley Griffin Water Tower in 1912/1913

In 1912 a water tower was built to supply water to the town. Leeton Post Office opened on 6 September 1912.

When the Water Conservation and Irrigation Commission of New South Wales was formed on 1 January 1913, Leeton was a canvas town, with the only houses being on farms built by settlers or the Commission-built homes for officers.

On 22 January 1913, under the provisions of the Crown Lands Act of 1884, Leeton was declared a town by the Department of Lands, Sydney.

The first block of land was sold in the town April 3, 1913. In1913, a Kurrajong tree (later known as Pioneers' Tree), was planted as a central feature on the eponymous Kurrajong Avenue, and a butter factory was established in the town. In August of the same year, Walter Burley Griffin visited the town to complete its design.

In 1914, World War I broke out; of the town's population of 2,000 people, 200 men were serving in the military. During 1914 and 1915 an abattoir and canning factory were established in the town.

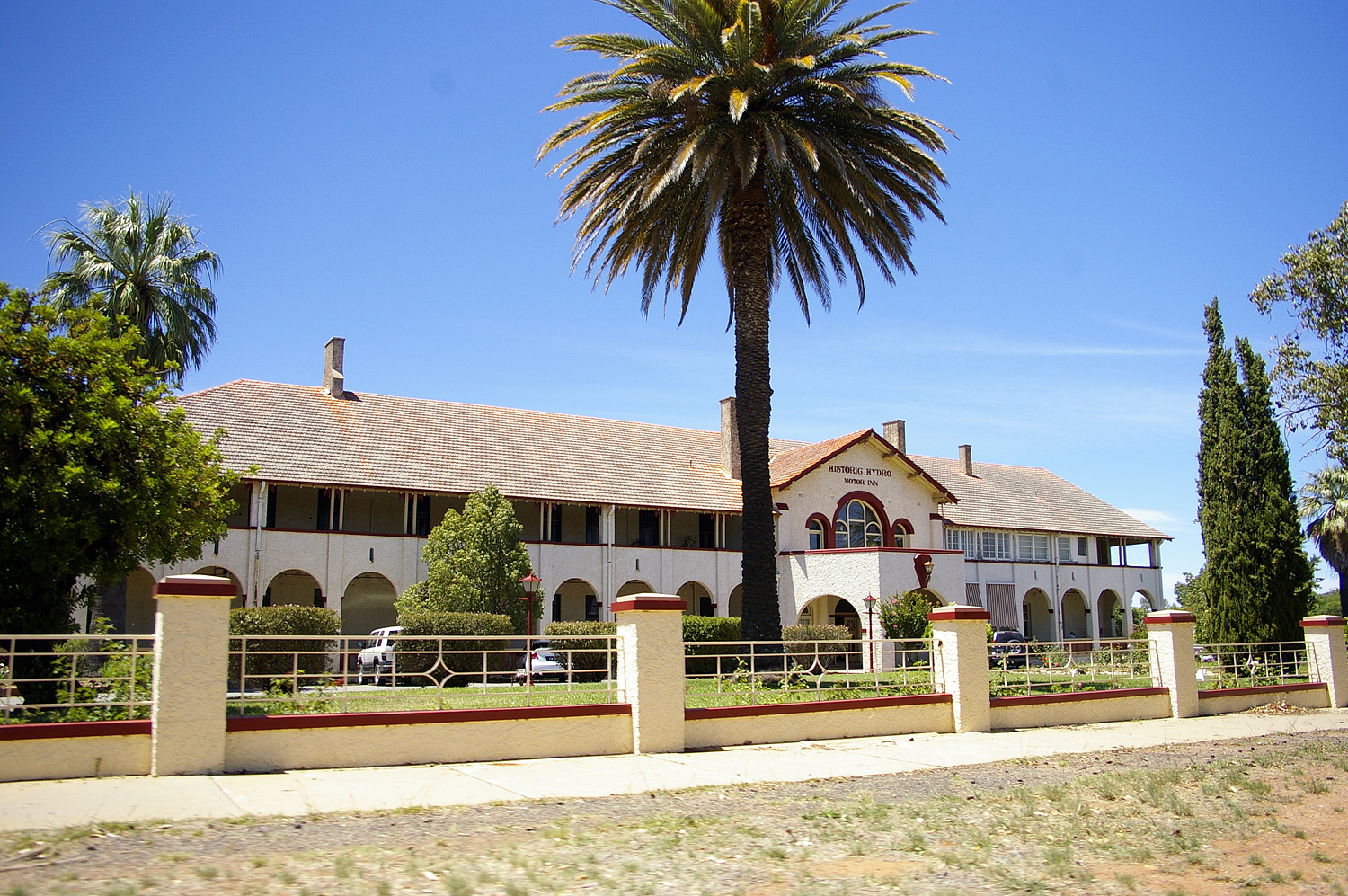
Historic Hydro Hotel

In 1919, the Hydro Hotel was constructed for Water Conservation and Irrigation Commission executives to stay whilst in Leeton, but was not licensed to sell alcohol until 1924 when the alcohol prohibition in the Murrumbidgee Irrigation Area was lifted.

During 1920, the Water Conservation and Irrigation Commission of New South Wales began to pressure the Government for relief for being responsible for providing civic and local government services with the Commission stating "revenue which comes mainly from rents and water charges, having remained unchanged, is insufficient to cover the cost of local government services now that the weekly wage is more than double the figure paid when the settlement started". The Commission chose and appointed an advisory board which was made up of pioneer farmers which already had been in operation in the Yanco area since 1913. In June 1925 the Commission released its annual report stating that a Royal Commission recommended setting up of local government bodies within the Murrumbidgee Irrigation Area but no date had been decided.

1 January 1928, the Willimbong Shire was formed with the name "Willimbong" being retained until 19 July 1946 when it was renamed as Leeton Shire.

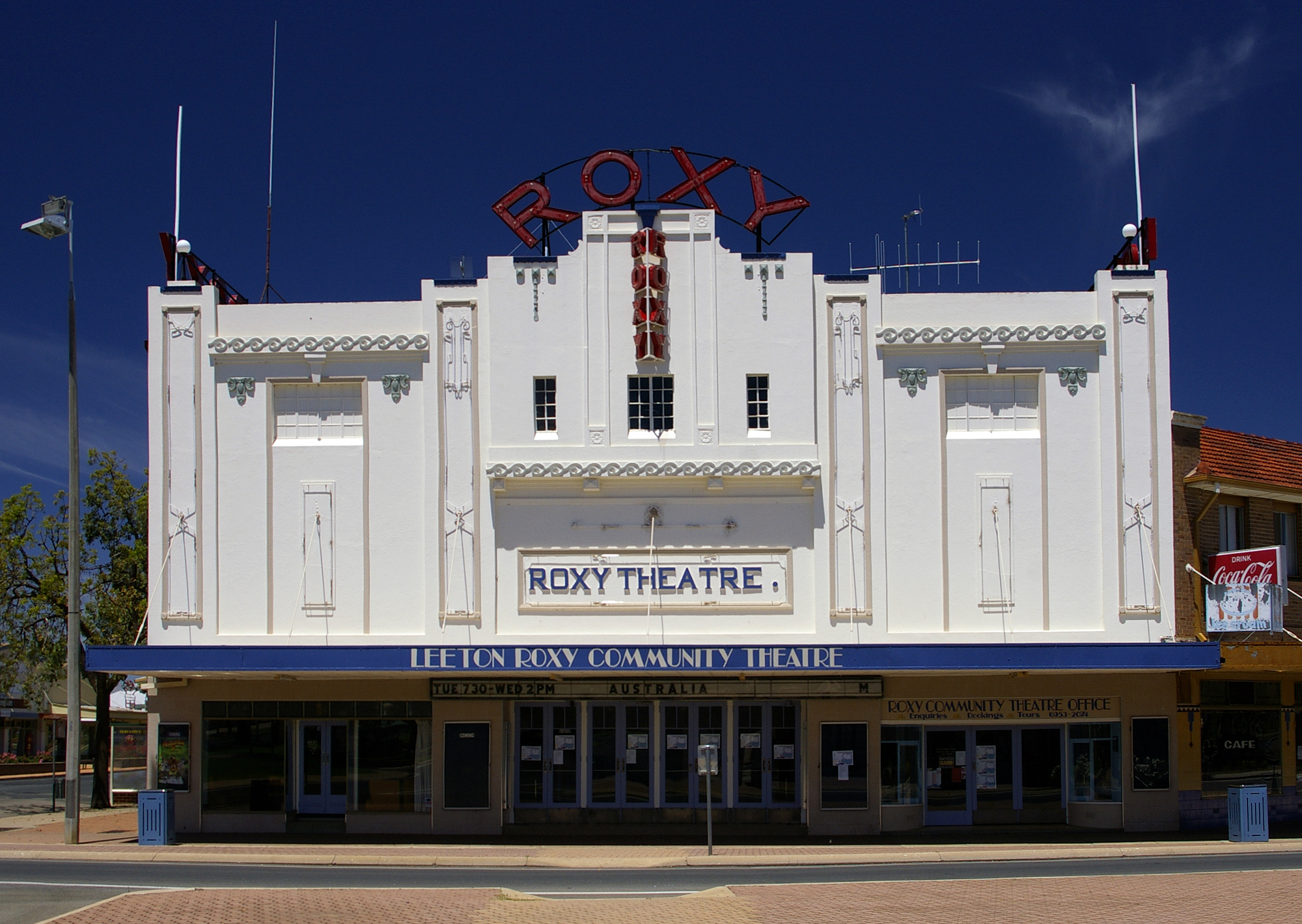
Roxy Theatre

In 1929 the Roxy Theatre was built on a large vacant block of land on the corner of Wade and Pine Avenue and was completed and opened in April 1930.

In 1930 Willimbong Shire become the trustee of the Leeton Racecourse, established in 1912, when the land was appropriated as a reserve for racing, public recreation and aviation. In August 1931 Southern Cross became the first aircraft to officially land at the aerodrome. During 1935, the aerodrome was refurbished to the standard that qualified it to base and fly commercial . In August 1935, Western and Southern Provincial (W.A.S.P.) Airlines commenced an air service between Leeton and Sydney. However the service was ended in 1936 when a Tugan Gannet aircraft used by W.A.S.P. Airlines crashed on 26 February 1936 in the Cordeaux Dam area.

In July 1938 it was proposed to the Willimbong Shire by the Civil Aviation Board that the area around Fivebough could be developed into an aerodrome since the Leeton Aerodrome at the race course was too small and could only operate on a restricted license. Willimbong Shire agreed to lease the land with preliminary work carried out on the site but the aerodrome was never used by any commercial airline.

During World War II, the Royal Australian Air Force established a training school in the nearby town of Narrandera which was a large aerodrome. After this, a report from the Department of Civil Aviation stated that Fivebough was eminently suitable as an aerodrome but strongly recommended that they should consider jointly operating the aerodrome with Narrandera Shire.

During the early part of the 1930s Willimbong Shire took over the town water supply when it became apparent that the town needed a second water tower which was completed next to the first tower on 27 March 1937.

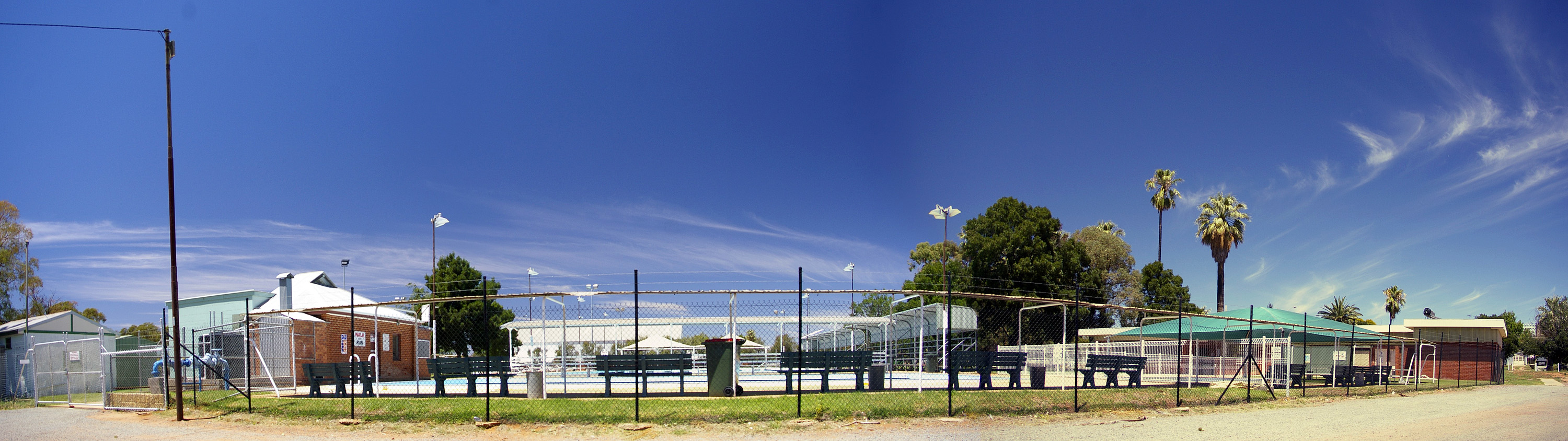
Leeton & District Memorial Swimming Pool

The swimming baths in Leeton were constructed by voluntary labour and were completed on 24 February 1932. The Leeton Swimming Club made a request that the swimming baths be replaced by a modern swimming complex. In 1959 money was raised though the Irrigana Festival, a biennial festival in the town, and the Leeton Shire obtained a loan. On 17 November 1962 the Leeton & District Memorial Swimming Pool was opened.

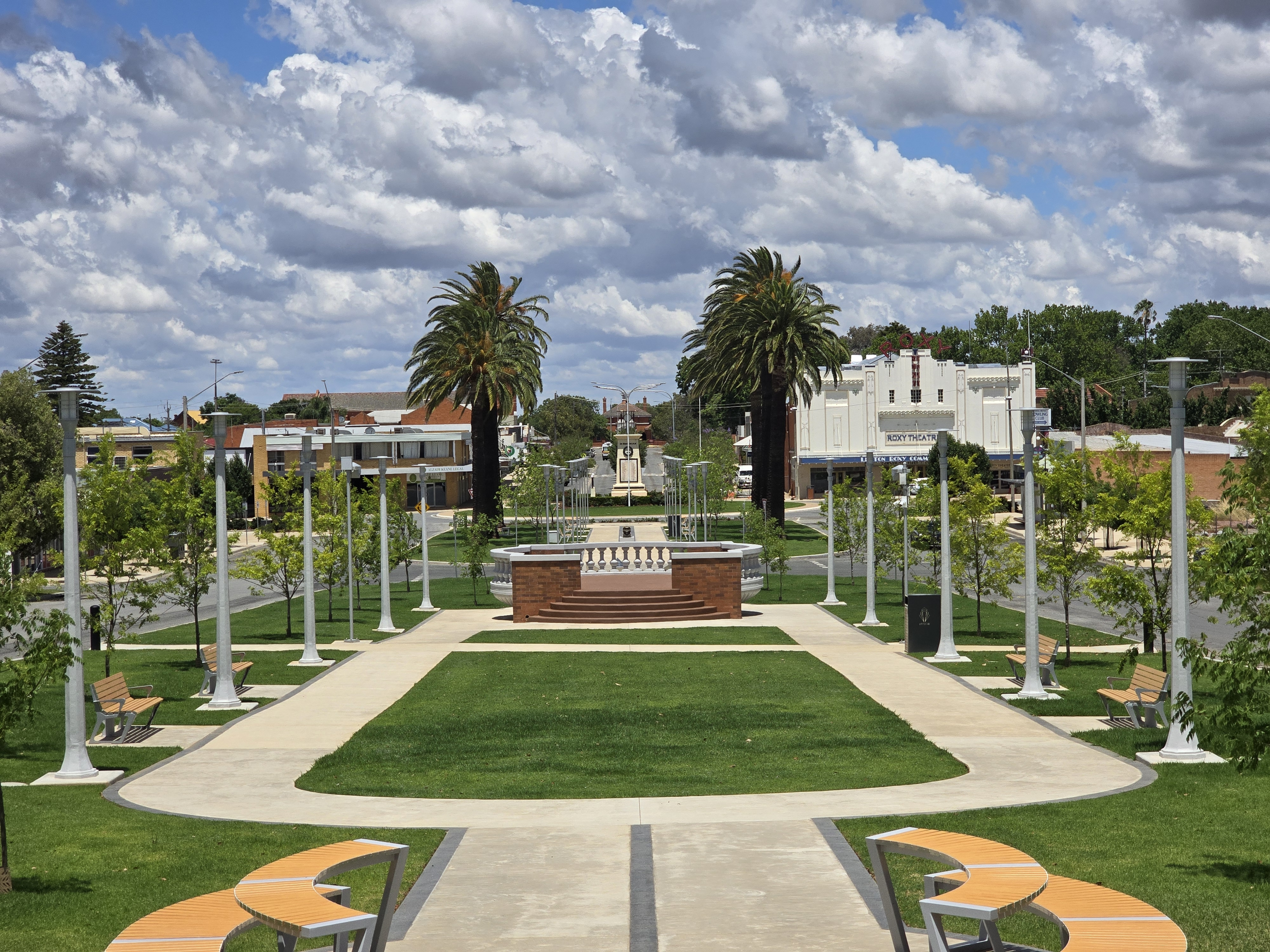
Chelmsford Place, Leeton NSW, December 2024

Rice growing became a major industry during World War II, under government promotion to help supply food for troops. A number of local farmers, such as teenager Norm Houghton, pioneered the planting of new varieties to suit the local conditions. The Irrigana Festival began in 1959 as a biennial event but was short lived due to a lack of strong publicity value. The name "Irrigana" was chosen from a competition in the Murrumbidgee Irrigator. In 1970 a similar festival returned in the town, known as the "Rice Bowl Festival", and by 1988 the festival was renamed to "Sunwhite Rice Festival" with sponsorship from SunRice.

=== Heritage listings ===
Leeton has a number of heritage-listed sites, including:

- Hydro Hotel
- Koonadan Historic Site
- Leeton District Lands Office
- Leeton District Office artefacts
- Leeton railway station
- Roxy Community Theatre

== Education ==
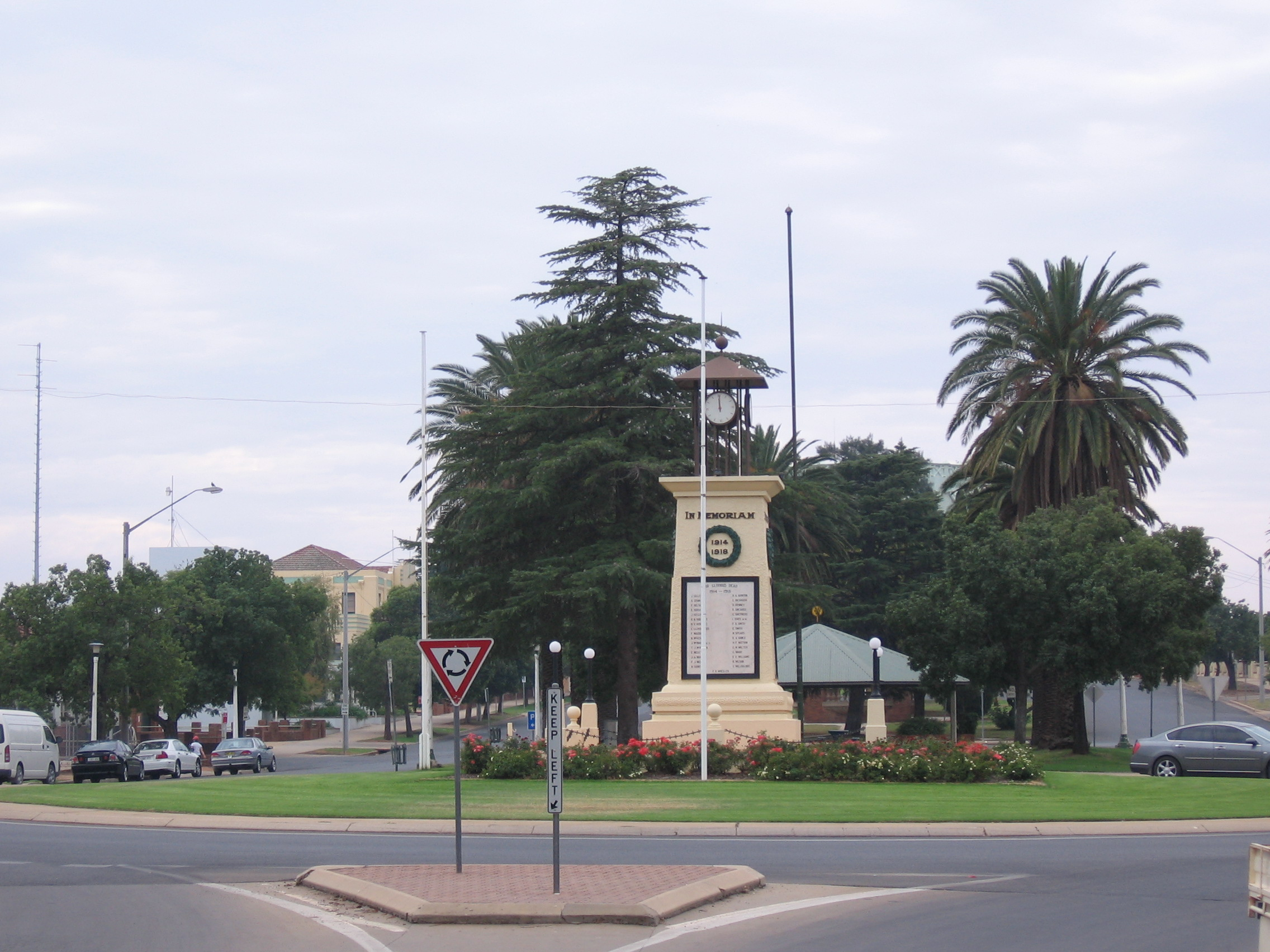
War memorial

Leeton is the second largest educational centre in the Riverina after Wagga Wagga.

Leeton Shire has three secondary schools:

- Leeton High School
- St Francis de Sales Regional College
- Yanco Agricultural High School

Leeton Shire has six primary schools:

- Leeton Public School
- Parkview Public School
- St Joseph's Primary School
- Wamoon Public School
- Yanco Public School
- Whitton Public School

Other education includes:

- TAFE NSW Riverina Institute
- Murrumbidgee College of Agriculture
- Gralee Support School
- MET School (Leeton Campus)
- Leeton Pre-School
- Leeton Early Learning Centre
- Goodstart Early Learning

== Climate ==
Leeton has a cold semi-arid climate (BSk), with hot, dry summers and cool, partly cloudy winters. It features 137.7 clear days annually.

Climate data for YANCO AGRICULTURAL INSTITUTE (1957−2026); 164 m AMSL; 34.62° S, 146.43° E
Month	Jan	Feb	Mar	Apr	May	Jun	Jul	Aug	Sep	Oct	Nov	Dec	Year
Record high °C (°F)	46.6 (115.9)	46.1 (115.0)	41.6 (106.9)	37.4 (99.3)	29.6 (85.3)	22.00 (71.60)	22.0 (71.6)	30.0 (86.0)	37.5 (99.5)	38.6 (101.5)	43.3 (109.9)	46.6 (115.9)	46.6 (115.9)
Mean daily maximum °C (°F)	34.0 (93.2)	32.6 (90.7)	29.2 (84.6)	24.3 (75.7)	19.1 (66.4)	15.1 (59.2)	14.6 (58.3)	16.5 (61.7)	20.6 (69.1)	24.8 (76.6)	28.7 (83.7)	31.3 (88.3)	24.2 (75.6)
Mean daily minimum °C (°F)	18.8 (65.8)	18.2 (64.8)	14.615 (58.31)	11.7 (53.1)	7.7 (45.9)	5.6 (42.1)	4.8 (40.6)	5.4 (41.7)	7.6 (45.7)	10.6 (51.1)	14.2 (57.6)	16.3 (61.3)	11.4 (52.5)
Record low °C (°F)	8.7 (47.7)	8.2 (46.8)	6.0 (42.8)	2.8 (37.0)	0.0 (32.0)	−3.0 (26.6)	−1.8 (28.8)	−2.8 (27.0)	−0.6 (30.9)	1.0 (33.8)	3.0 (37.4)	5.9 (42.6)	−3.0 (26.6)
Average precipitation mm (inches)	32.4 (1.28)	30.6 (1.20)	36.3 (1.43)	32.0 (1.26)	37.9 (1.49)	36.6 (1.44)	35.3 (1.39)	37.4 (1.47)	38.0 (1.50)	39.1 (1.54)	35.1 (1.38)	32.7 (1.29)	423.3 (16.67)
Average rainy days	4.8	4.0	5.0	5.5	8.4	11.7	13.0	11.7	9.3	7.5	6.4	5.7	93.0
Source: https://reg.bom.gov.au/climate/averages/tables/cw_074037_All.shtml

== Transport ==
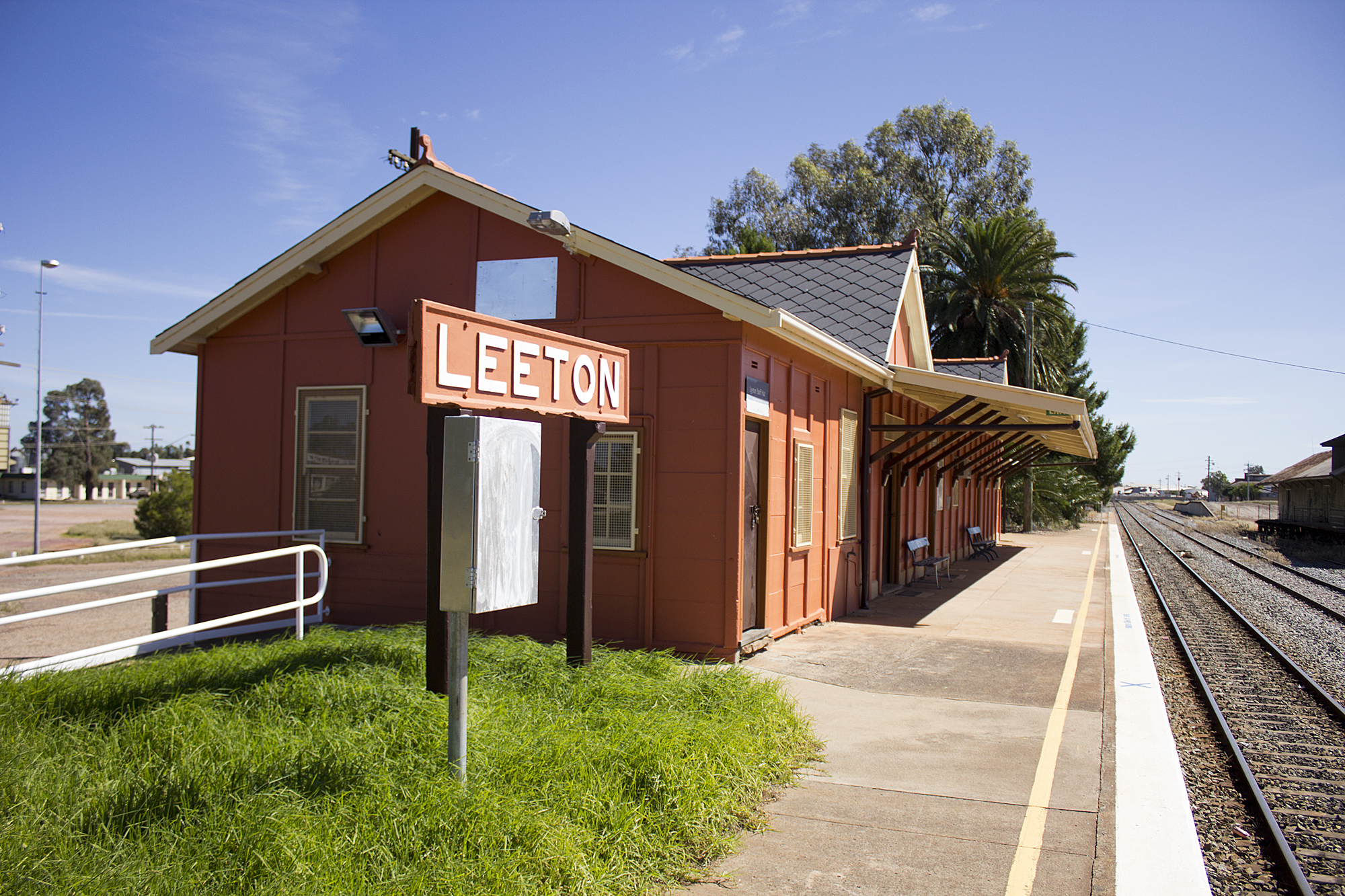
Leeton railway station sign

Leeton is approximately 450 km from Melbourne along the Newell, Goulburn Valley and Hume Highways and 550 km from Sydney along the Sturt and Hume Highways. There are daily flights leaving Narrandera Airport, operated by Regional Express. The airport is located near the shire boundary, approximately 20 km from the CBD. There are coach services to Sydney and Adelaide, leaving Leeton Coach Terminal in Gidgee Street daily. NSW TrainLink also operates coach services to Wagga Wagga connecting with XPT services to Sydney and Melbourne. An Xplorer service to Griffith calls at Leeton railway station on Wednesday and Saturday, with the return service to Sydney calling on Thursday and Sunday.

== Industry ==
The processing of agricultural products comprises Leeton's largest industry. SunRice is Leeton's largest employer. Its international headquarters are located in the town, as well a rice mill and manufacturing plants. Other major companies include The Daily Juice Company, JBS Australia (as a subsidiary of JBS S.A.), Murrumbidgee Irrigation Limited, Pacific Fresh,Toorak Wines, Lillypilly Wines and Southern Central Engineering, as well as the Arnott's Group, located in Stanbridge, and Southern Cotton, located in Whitton.

The Vance Industrial Estate houses many smaller scale industrial companies.

== Attractions ==
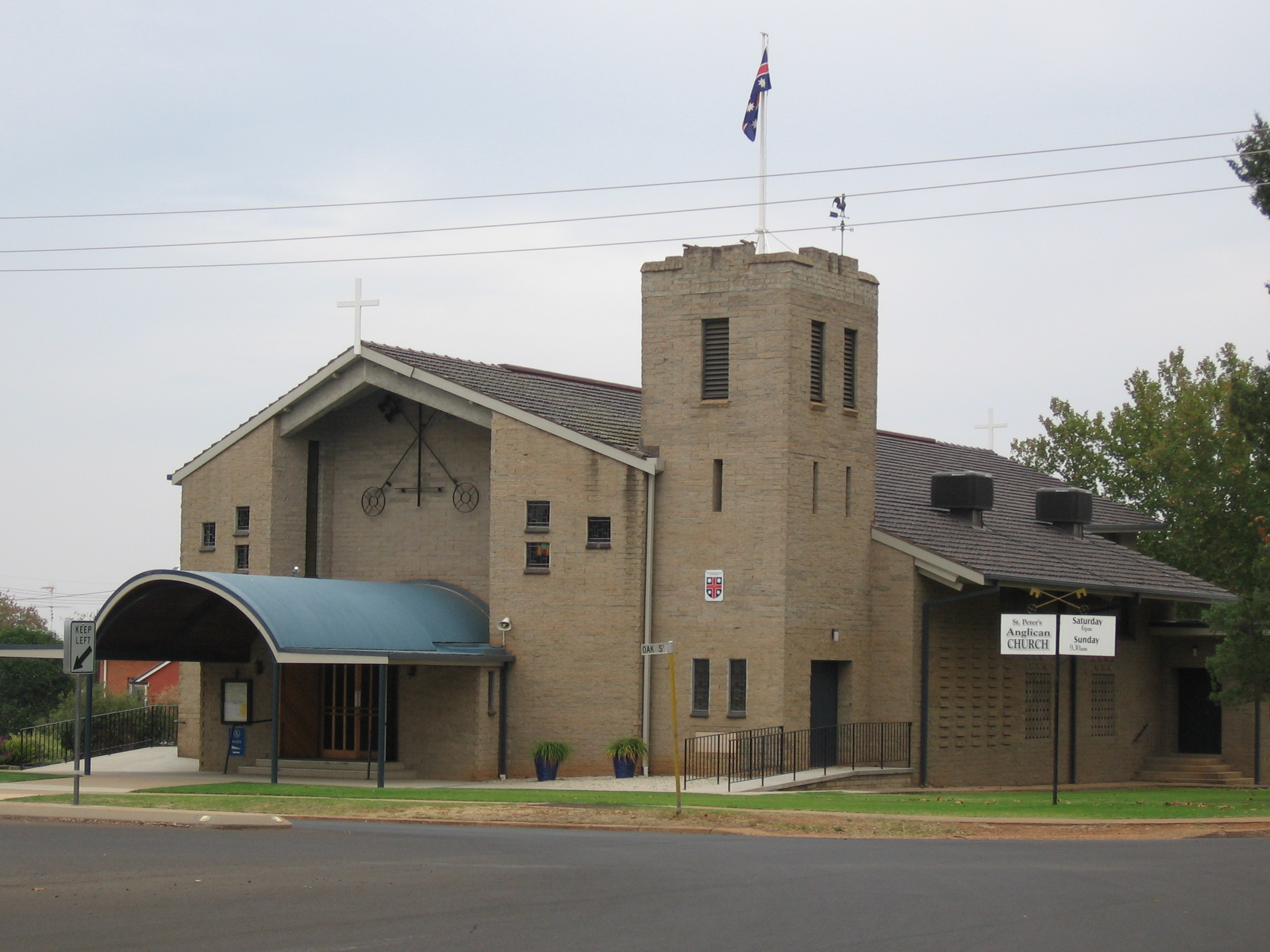
St Peter's Anglican Church

Leeton has a number of town landmarks, including the Roxy Theatre, War Memorial, Madonna Place, St Peter's Church and The Burley Griffin water towers.

=== Outdoors ===
The Ramsar-listed Fivebough and Tuckerbil Wetlands as well as the nearby Murrumbidgee River and Murrumbidgee Valley National Park provide ample opportunities for bushwalking and birdwatching.

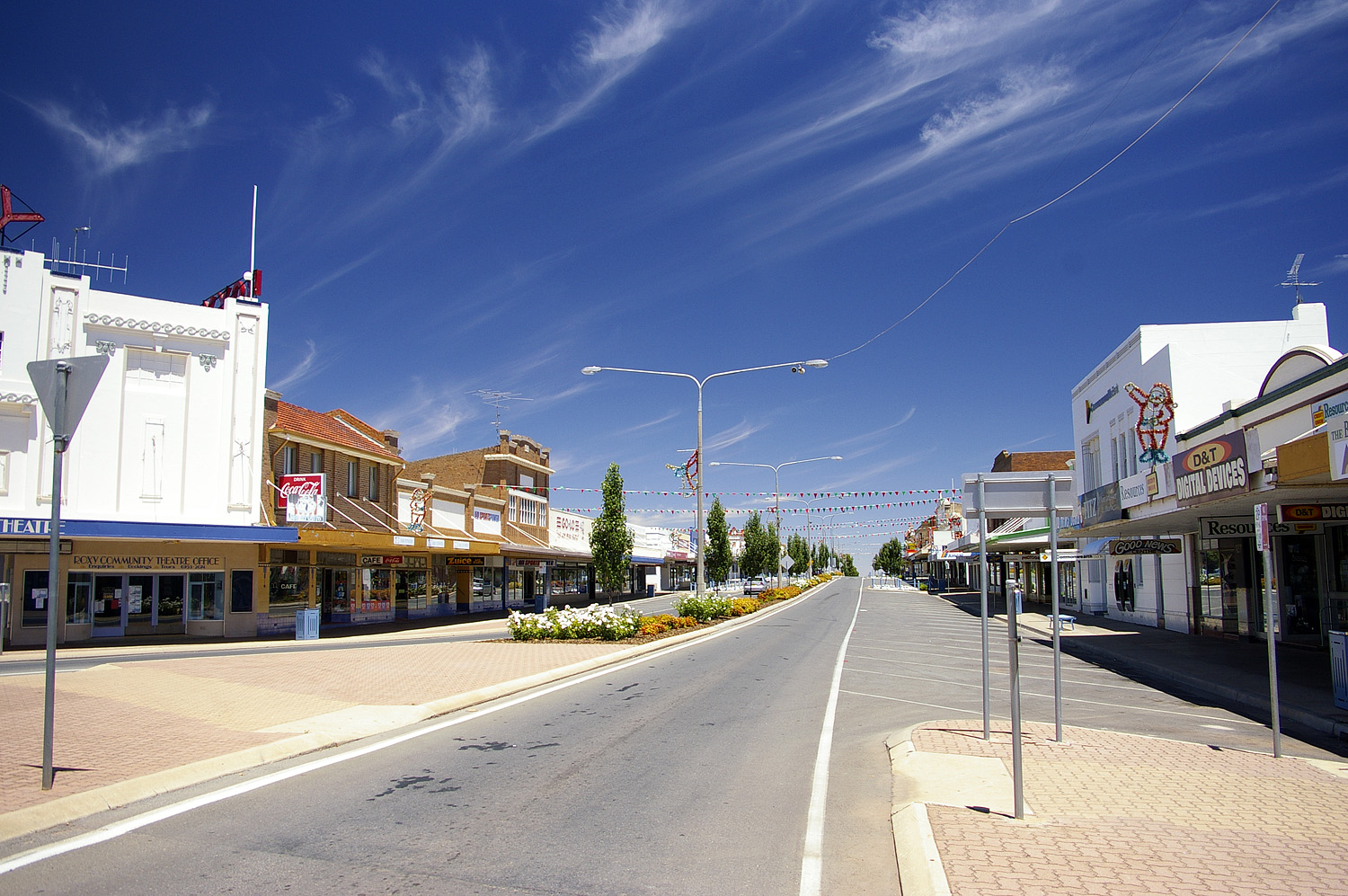
Pine Avenue forms part of the main street of Leeton

== Media ==
Leeton's town newspaper The Irrigator (formerly known as The Murrumbidgee Irrigator) is released throughout the region on Saturday. Local radio stations are ABC Riverina on 100.6 FM, Star FM on 99.7 FM and 2RG. WIN Television also broadcasts the local news of the Riverina on weeknights.

== Sport ==
The Leeton Greens play rugby league in the Group 20 Rugby League competition and have won eight premierships. The club was founded in the 1920s and play on Leeton No 1 Oval. They are the current reigning premiers as of 2022.

The Leeton-Whitton Crows play Australian rules football in the Riverina Football League and were formed by a merger of the Leeton Redlegs and Whitton-Yanco Tigers in 1995. They won their first premiership since the merger in 2017, breaking a 39-year premiership drought.

Leeton United Football Club play soccer in the Griffith District Football Association and were formed in 1962.

== Notable citizens ==
Notable citizens originating from Leeton include:

- Kurt Aylett (Australian rules footballer)
- Linda Burney (Former Minister for Indigenous Australians and MP for the Division of Barton, and former NSW Labor deputy leader and MLA for Canterbury)
- John Faulkner (Australian Labor Party Senator)
- Matthew Dunn (Three-time Olympic swimmer (Barcelona 1992, Atlanta 1996, Sydney 2000) and seven-time Commonwealth Games gold medallist)
- Ross Elwin, Australian rules footballer
- Rod Maybon (National Rugby League footballer)
- Robert McLachlan (professional road bicycle racer)
- Peter Peters (National Rugby League footballer and commentator)
- Jay Bandy (former National Rugby League player)
- Mathew Feagai (National Rugby League player)
- Max Feagai (National Rugby League player)
- Clint Halden (former National Rugby League player)
- Jeff Robson (former National Rugby League player)
- Mark Taylor (Former captain of the Australia national cricket team, cricketer, and commentator)
- Helen Wellings (consumer advocate)
- Craig Nettelbeck (Former Australian Football League footballer)
- Max Kruse (Former VFL footballer)
- Jacob Hopper (AFL footballer)
- Cooper Sharman, Australian rules footballer
- Jacob Townsend (Former AFL and current VFL footballer).
- Marika Vunibaka, former rugby union player

Australian poet and writer Henry Lawson lived in Leeton for two years, from 1916 to 1917. Lawson had been hired to write about the Murrumbidgee Irrigation Area to attract settlers to the area.
