= Norm Houghton (magician) =

Canadian magician (1909–1998)

- Born: Norman DeBlois Houghton; 3 February 1909; Montreal, Quebec, Canada
- Died: 4 March 1998
- Known for: Flushtration Count

Norman DeBlois Houghton (February 3, 1909 – March 4, 1998) was a Canadian magician, who was best known as the creator of the card sleight known as the Flushtration Count.

Houghton was born in Canada, settled in Toronto and joined the Canadian Army during World War II, serving in Italy.
