= Norm Houghton (pioneer irrigator) =

Australian rice farmer (d. 2014)

Norm Houghton (pioneer irrigator) (died 2014), was a rice farmer in Leeton, New South Wales, who pioneered the irrigation rice growing in the district.

At the age of 15 Houghton took over running the family farm while his brother was in the army and his father was too sick to work. In response to government needs for rice to feed the troops, local growers, including teenagers such as Houghton, pioneered special varieties that were suited to districts where previously vegetable and dairy farmers had struggled. Houghton joined the Rice Growers' Association in 1955 and made a substantial contribution to the organisation over 50 years, which was recognised at the Association's 80th Annual Conference in Leeton in 2010. He played a significant role in The Yanco Irrigation Area Agricultural Society while his irrigation properties were held up as difinitive examples of the achievement in the Yanco Irrigation Inquiry. He also was prominent in the development of the Murrumbidgee Club in Narrandera, which he subsequently authored the definitive history

Houghton was a professional football player with the Canterbury team, but gave up a promising career to run his farm and raise his family. He had eight children. He was also member of the Leeton Rotary Club for more than 50 years, including a stints as president and various other officer bearer, a long-standing member of the Assumption Villa, and Eventide Homes Board of directors. He married Yvonne his wife of more than 60 years on 7 February 1953 and had eight children and 27 grandchildren.

Houghton was presented with the lifelong citizen award in the Australia Day honours in 2013 in Leeton, New South Wales.
