= Whitton, New South Wales =

Whitton
- Town
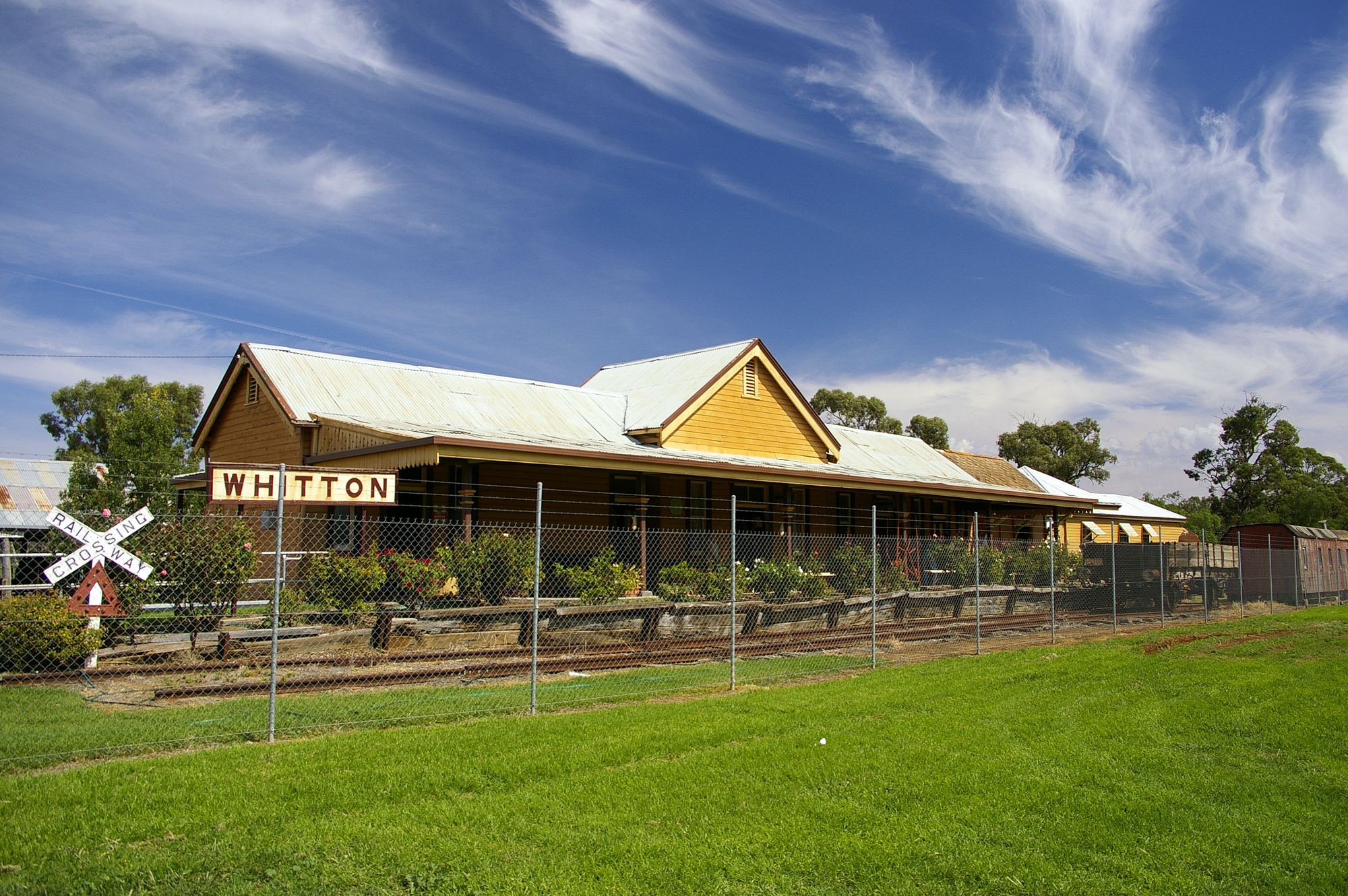
- Train station, now disused and relocated to the town museum

- Coordinates: 34°30′54″S 146°11′06″E
- Country: Australia
- State: New South Wales
- LGA: Leeton Shire
- Location: 11 km (6.8 mi) from Gogeldrie; 22 km (14 mi) from Leeton

Government
  - State electorate: Murray
  - Federal division: Farrer
- Elevation: 147 m (482 ft)

Population
  - Total: 523 (2021 census)
- Postcode: 2705
- County: Cooper

Whitton is a small town located in Leeton Shire in the Australian state of New South Wales and is located 23 km (14 mi) west of the Leeton township. Founded in 1850, it is named after John Whitton (1820–98), Engineer-in-Charge of the New South Wales Government Railways. The railway reached Whitton in 1881. At the 2021 census, Whitton had a population of 523.

== History ==
Whitton was originally named "Hulong" and is the oldest town in the Murrumbidgee Irrigation Area. It developed on a main teamster route transporting goods to the South-West of New South Wales. Hulong was renamed to Whitton in 1883.

== Services ==
The Whitton township contains the Ricebowl Hotel, a general store, a post office, St Carthage Catholic Church (closed), Whitton Uniting Church (closed), St John's Anglican Church, a fire station, a bowling club, a primary school, a public swimming pool and a number of houses.

Whitton also supports several Agribusiness manufacturing business such as Southern Cotton's Cotton gin and Voyager Malt's craft Malt production facility, as well as a regional tourist attraction, the Whitton Malt House that was opened in late 2020.

== Sport ==
Whitton formerly had a rugby league team competing in the Group 17 Rugby League competition, known as the Whitton Bulls. They won the competition in 1998 and 2001, and reached numerous Grand Finals around this period, before folding in the mid 2000s. The club's home ground, the Whitton Sports Ground, has since been abandoned and fallen into a state of disrepair. The site, which still contains the timekeeper's box, rusted rugby league goalposts and the remains of the clubrooms amongst the overgrown weeds, has become a site frequented by curious explorers. The ground is located on the Whitton-Darlington Point Road, about 100 m (300 ft) south of the intersection on the bend of the Irrigation Way.

The town nominally has a merged Australian Rules Football team, the Leeton-Whitton Crows, who play in the Riverina Football League, although the club has not played in Whitton for many decades. Prior to merging with Leeton, the town had a team with Yanco, known as the Whitton-Yanco Tigers.

== Notable people ==
- Bill Box, Australian rules footballer
- Linda Burney, member of the Australian House of Representatives for Barton and Minister for Indigenous Australians
- Stan Lloyd, Australian rules footballer

== Gallery ==
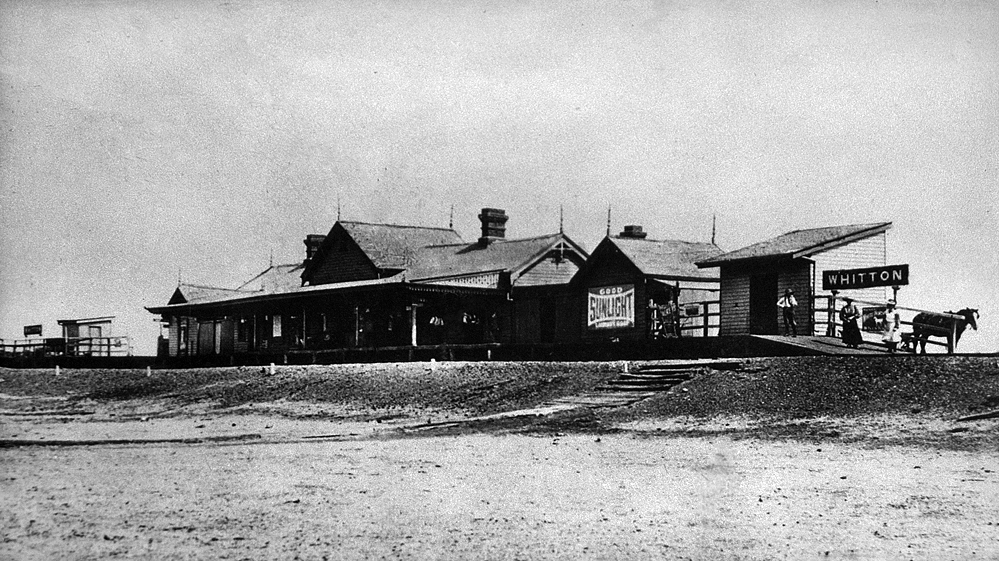
Whitton Railway Station (1899-1925)

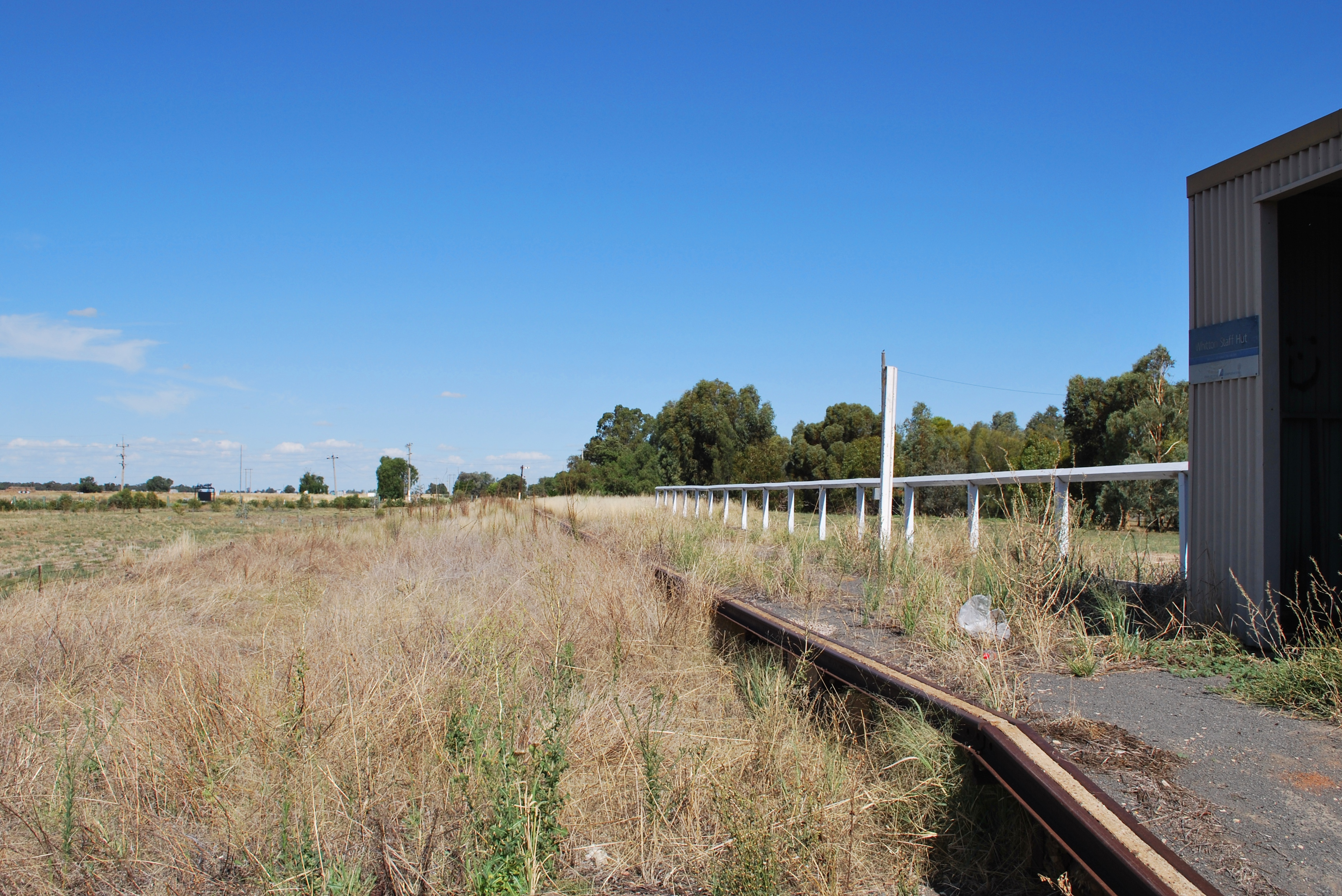
Whitton Railway Station

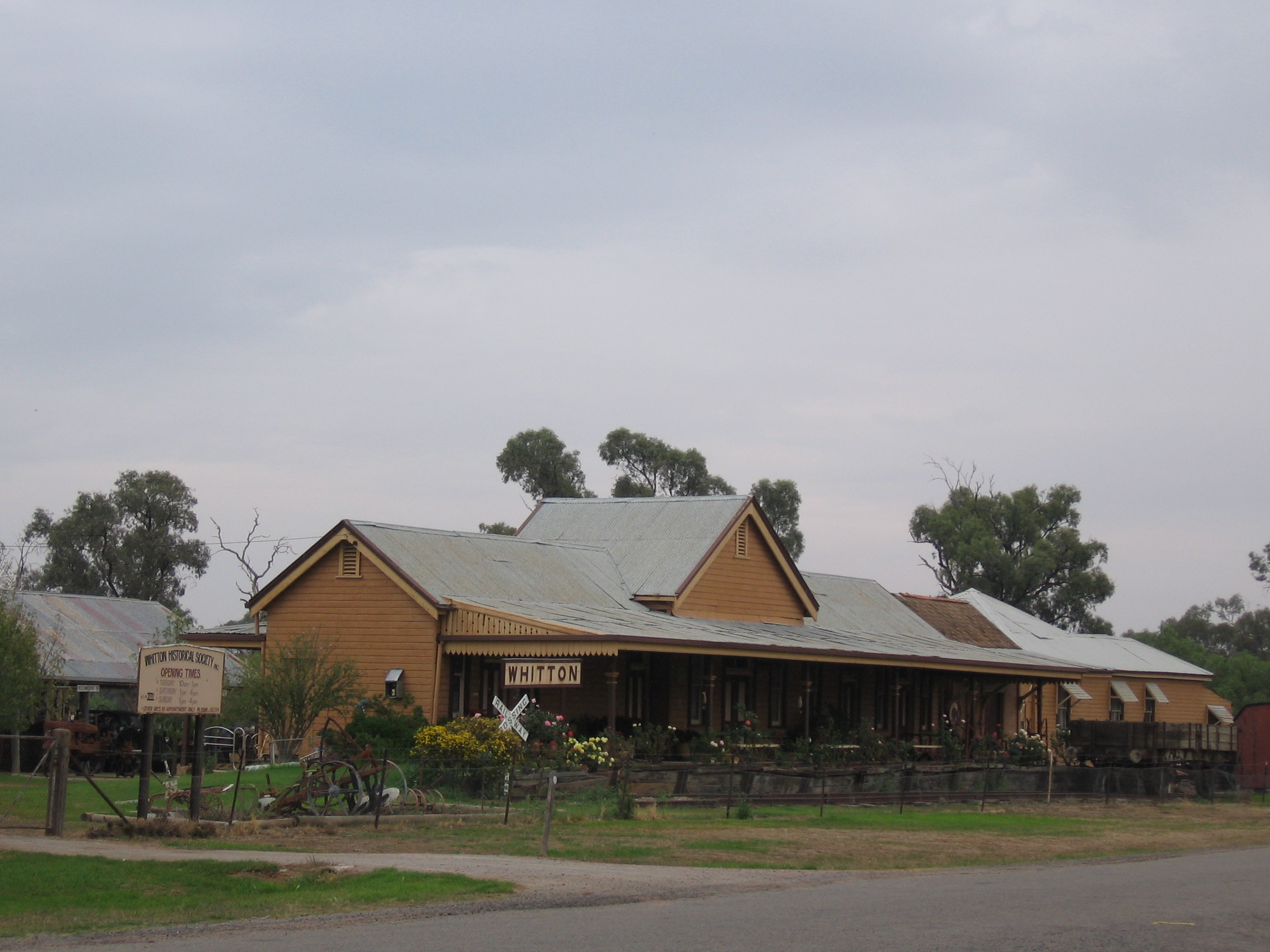
Whitton Railway Station

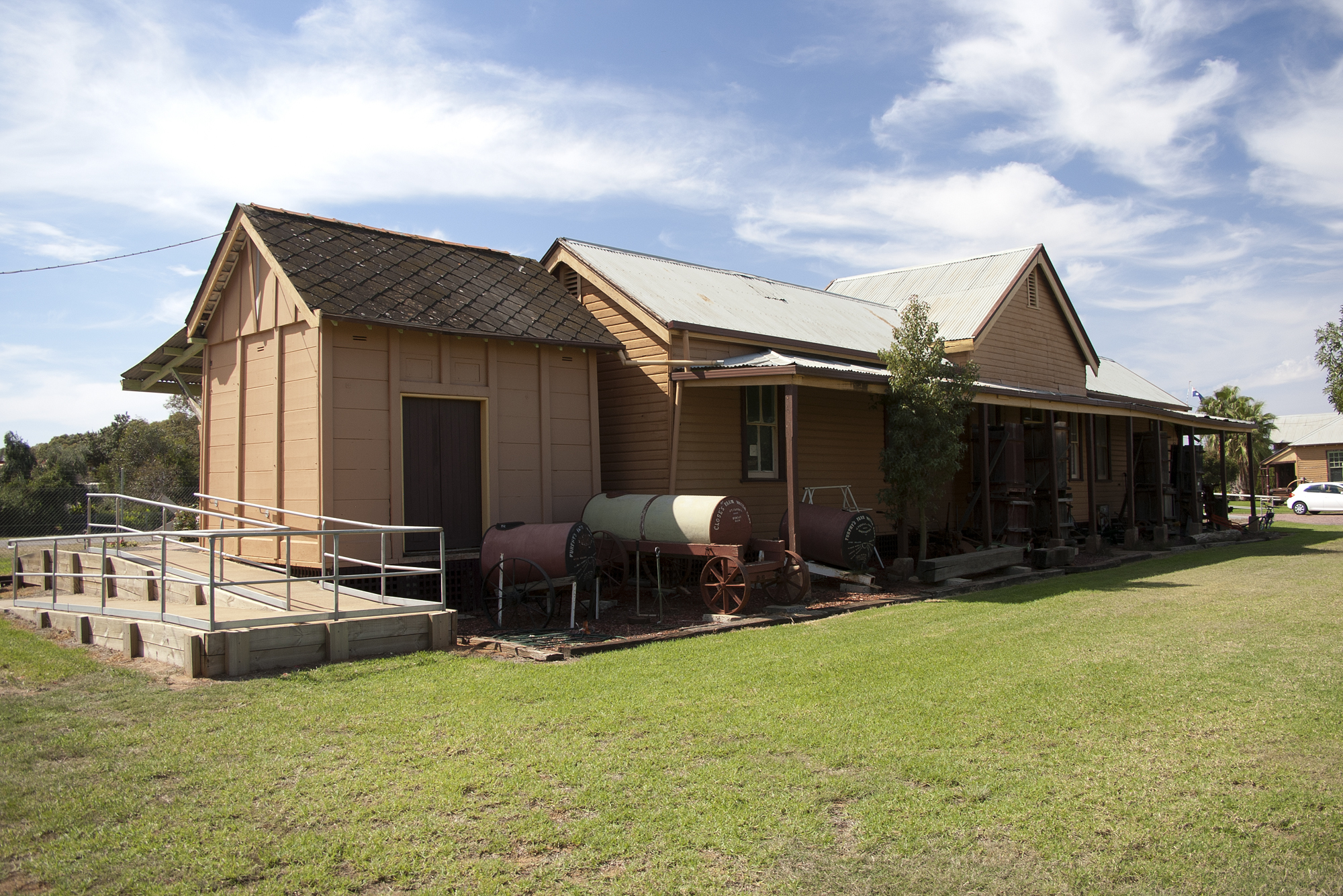
Whitton Railway Station

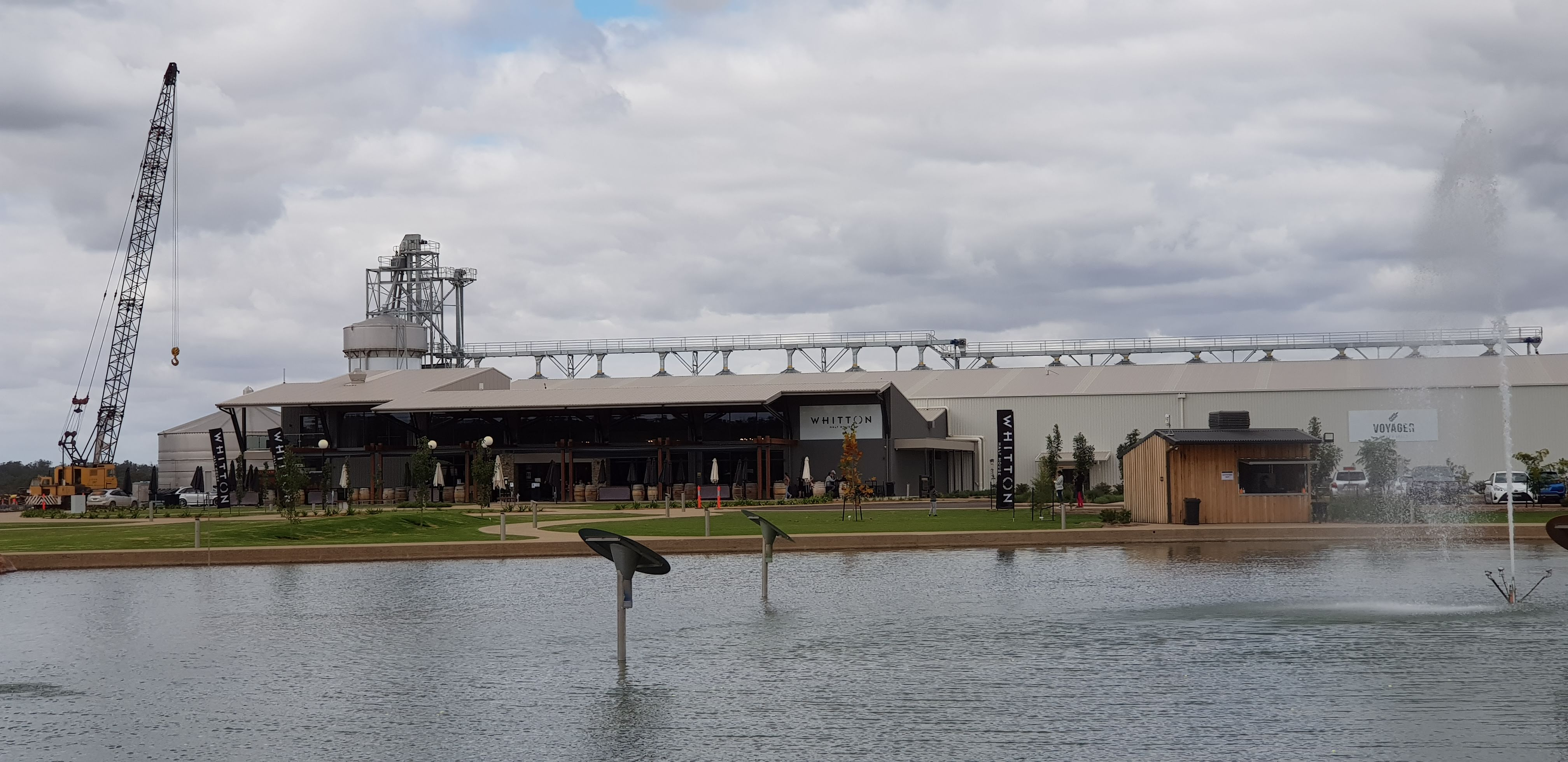
Whitton Malt House venue in front of the Voyager Craft Malt factory (2021)

Preceding station	Former services	Following station
Willbriggie towards Hay	Hay Line	Gogeldrie towards Junee
