= Murrumbidgee Irrigation =

Australian company

Murrumbidgee Irrigation Limited
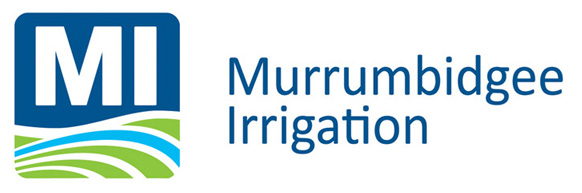
- Company type: Unlisted Public Company
- Industry: Irrigation Water Management
- Founded: 1999
- Headquarters: Griffith, New South Wales, Australia
- Key people: Tracey Valenzisi, Chair; Philip Holliday, Chief Executive Officer
- Products: Irrigation Water
- Number of employees: 160
- Website: www.mirrigation.com.au

Murrumbidgee Irrigation Limited (MI) is one of five privately owned irrigation companies in New South Wales, Australia. It provides irrigation water and drainage services to an area known as the Murrumbidgee Irrigation Area (MIA). MI manages A$500 million of infrastructure assets, has an annual turnover of $40 million, and services over A$2.5 billion in water entitlements.

== History ==
The Murrumbidgee Irrigation Area (MIA) was established in 1912 following the commissioning of Burrinjuck Dam in the New South Wales Snowy Mountains. The MIA was originally conceived primarily as a gravitational irrigation system near the Murrumbidgee River at Yanco, New South Wales. Further expansion occurred in the 1970s with the completion of the Snowy Mountains Scheme and the construction of the Blowering Dam. In 1999 the MIA and Districts were formally separated from the ownership by the Government of New South Wales and now operate as an unlisted public company (limited by permanent shares owned by its customers - the local irrigators). The company builds the Roach’s Surge Reservoir near Yanco, holding up to 5 million tonnes of water.
