= Murrumbidgee Irrigation Area =

Food production system in south east Australia

Coordinates: 34°19′10″S 146°04′02″E

Irrigation in the Riverina area of New South Wales, Australia
- Irrigated area: 660,000 hectares (1,600,000 acres)
- Water sources for irrigation: Murrumbidgee River via the Burrinjuck Dam; Tumut River via the Blowering Dam
- Annual investment in irrigation: A$5 billion

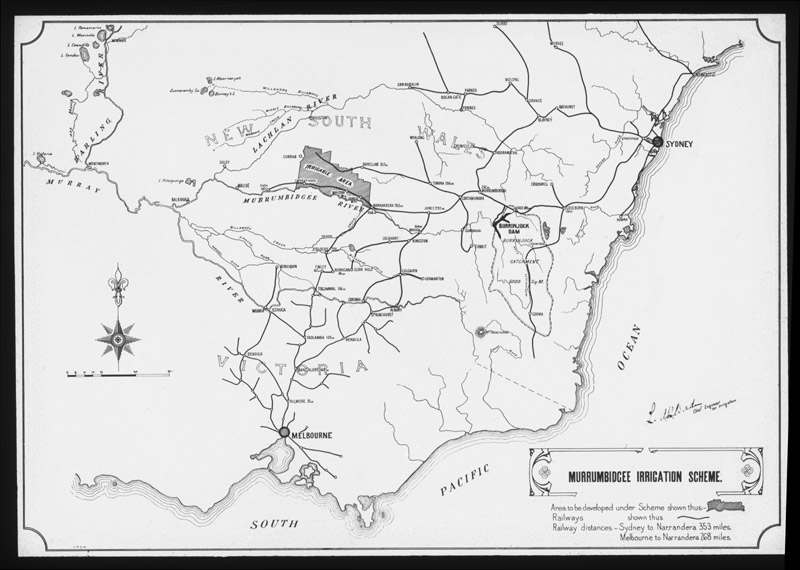
1908 map of the Murrumbidgee Irrigation Area

The Murrumbidgee Irrigation Area (MIA) is geographically located within the Riverina area of New South Wales. It was created to control and divert the flow of local river and creek systems for the purpose of food production. The main river systems feeding and fed by the area are the Murrumbidgee and the Tumut. It is one of the most diverse and productive regions in Australia contributing over A$5 billion annually to the Australian economy.

As a result of the New South Wales Royal Commission into the Conservation of Water in the 1880s, the establishment of the MIA commenced in 1903 with the construction of canals west of Narrandera and the construction of Burrinjuck Dam.

The MIA was formally established in 1912 after the commissioning of the Burrinjuck Dam on the Murrumbidgee River. Further expansion occurred in the 1970s with the completion of the Snowy Mountains Scheme and construction of Blowering Dam on the Tumut River, which meets the Murrumbidgee near Gundagai. Subsequent expansion of Burrinjuck Dam led to further expansion of the MIA and as well as the capacity to generate hydro-electricity.

The system is still regarded as a major engineering achievement comprising an elaborate series of weirs, canals and holding ponds (fed by upstream rivers and dams).

Many of the towns within the area which include Leeton and Griffith were purpose built and designed for the project and remain as thriving communities today. The two towns are growing at a rapid rate due to sustainable employment. The growth of inland centres is unusual for central New South Wales which displays the uniqueness of the MIA.

The layout of the towns of Griffith and Leeton were designed in 1914 by Walter Burley Griffin, an American architect and town planner who had just won the competition for the plan for Canberra in 1912.

== See also ==
- Murrumbidgee Irrigation Limited
- Irrigation in Australia
- Snowy Mountains Scheme
- Burrinjuck Dam
- Blowering Dam
- Leeton
- Griffith
