= Commercial Hotel =

Commercial Hotel or The Commercial Hotel may refer to:

== Australia ==
- Commercial Hotel, Albury, New South Wales
- Commercial Hotel, Fremantle, Western Australia

== United Kingdom ==
- Commercial Hotel, Knaresborough, North Yorkshire

== United States ==
(by state then city)

- Commercial Hotel, Flomaton, Alabama, (also known as the Hart Hotel) listed on the National Register of Historic Places (NRHP) in Escambia County
- Commercial Hotel (Fort Smith, Arkansas), NRHP-listed in Sebastian County
- Commercial Hotel (Mountain View, Arkansas), NRHP-listed in Stone County
- Commercial Hotel (Granite, Colorado), NRHP-listed in Chaffee County
- Hotel Wapello, Wapello, Iowa, also known as Commercial Hotel, NRHP-listed in Louisa County
- Commercial House Hotel, Spring Valley, Minnesota, NRHP-listed in Fillmore County
- Commercial Hotel (Wabasso, Minnesota), NRHP-listed in Redwood County
- Commercial Hotel (Wadena, Minnesota), NRHP-listed in Wadena County
- The Commercial Hotel (Verdigre, Nebraska), NRHP-listed in Knox County
- Commercial Hotel (DuBois, Pennsylvania), NRHP-listed in Clearfield County
- Hotel Washington (Madison, Wisconsin), previously known as the "Commercial Hotel"
- Commercial Hotel (Prairie du Chien, Wisconsin), NRHP-listed in Crawford County
