= CWA Rest House =

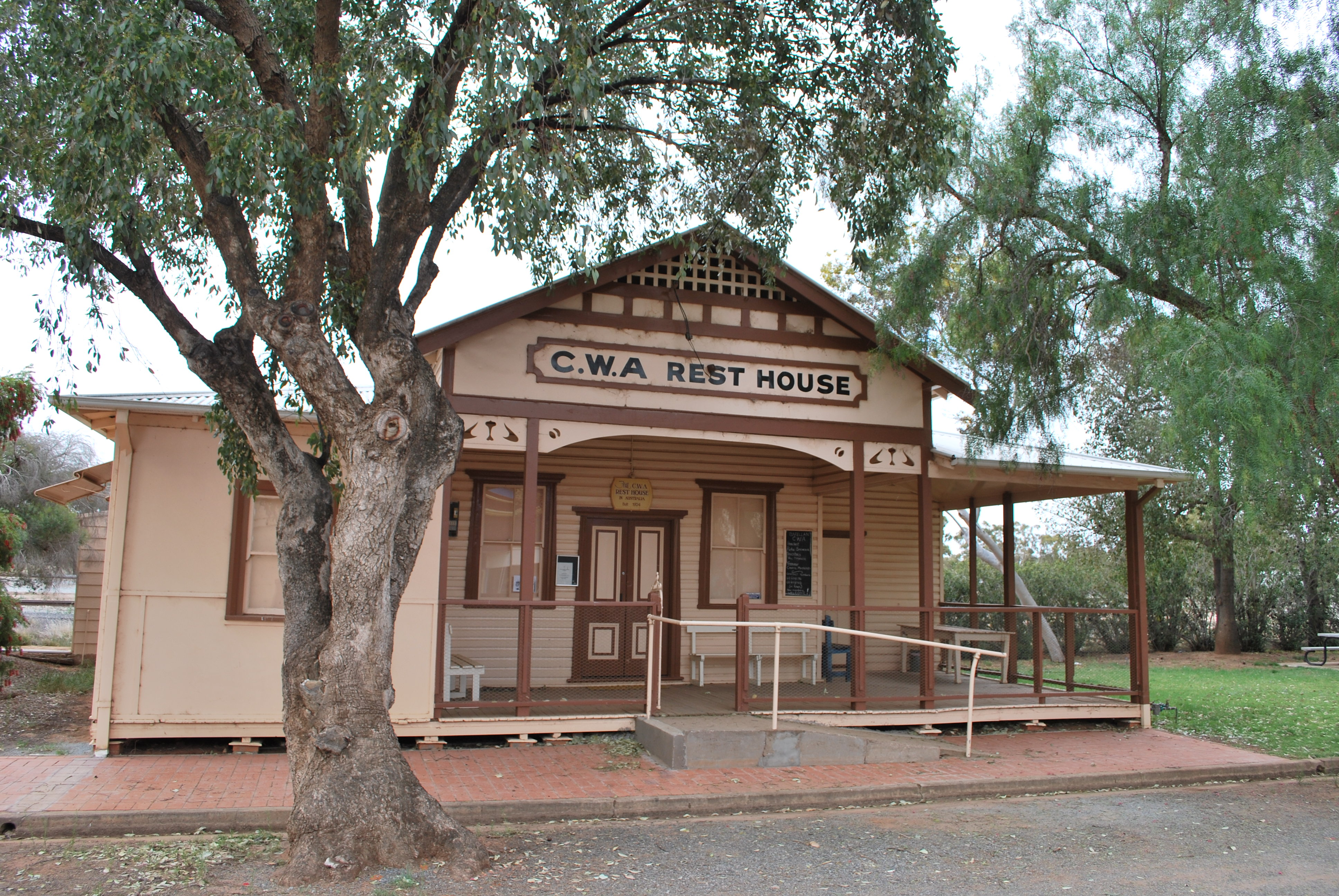

- Location within New South Wales Location within Australia
- 34.2845°S 146.5727°E
- Location: Yapunyah Street, Barellan, Narrandera Shire, New South Wales, Australia

History
- Built: 1924–1924

Site notes
- Architect: George William Welch

New South Wales Heritage Register
- Official name: CWA Rest House; Country Womens Association hall; Country Women's Association meeting rooms
- Type: state heritage (built)
- Designated: 18 November 2011
- Reference no.: 1876
- Type: Hall Country Women's Association
- Category: Community Facilities

CWA Rest House is a heritage-listed Country Women's Association rest house in the Riverina region of New South Wales, Australia. It is located on Yapunyah Street, Barellan and was designed by George William Welch, built in 1924. It is also known as Country Women's Association hall and Country Women's Association meeting rooms. It was added to the New South Wales State Heritage Register on 18 November 2011.

== History ==
=== History of the CWA ===
The Country Women's Association (CWA) of New South Wales, the first such group in Australia, was founded at a Bushwomen's Conference held in conjunction with the Royal Agricultural Show in Sydney in 1922. It began and has remained a non-sectarian, non-party-political, non-profit lobby group and service association working in the interests of women and children in rural areas. Although in practice the group has tended to bolster conservative politics, historically it has also been a progressive force in many ways. While it has defended traditional gender roles, it has also advocated a greater public role for country women. As early as 1936 the NSW branch passed a resolution in favour of equal pay for women. Although its influence has declined in recent years the CWA with its large membership and longevity was arguably the most influential twentieth century women's organisation in New South Wales.

The brief of the CWA which formed out of the 1922 conference was to improve the conditions of women on the land. They adopted the motto "Honour to God, Loyalty to Throne, Service to the Country, Through Country Women, For Country Women, By Country Women." The association expanded rapidly. By 1924 there were 120 branches with 4500 members and 21 rest rooms had been financed and fitted out. By 1927 membership had more than doubled and there were 191 branches. By 1928 it was the largest women's organisation in the state. By 1937, there were more than 17,000 members, 345 branches and 133 Younger Sets. By 1953 there were 28,000 members and 517 branches, 182 rest rooms, 157 baby health centres, holiday homes, rest homes, hospitals, school hostels and playgrounds.

The CWA rest rooms in New South Wales country towns were the base of CWA activity. It was intended to be a "home away from home, where they could put their feet up, allow the kids to roam free, make a cup of tea and conduct meetings in dignity and comfort". The rest rooms were a source of community pride and continued to be built over the decades.

Although the specific activities of individual branches varied, among other endeavours they supported the Bush Nursing Association, the Far West Children's Health Scheme, the Bush Book Club, Girl Guides, and Boy Scouts, Travellers Aid and the Flying Doctor Service. From the 1930s handicrafts featured prominently among the association's activities, and they also produced numerous cookbooks. Association news was regularly reported in the Stock and Station Journal and in 1937 the CWA's own journal was established.

During World War II, many CWA activities were directed to supporting the war effort. They entertained and fed men in country training camps, supported the Australian Comforts Fund and knitted garments for soldiers. They particularly took on the task of making camouflage netting for the army from 1942. Over 400 camouflage netting circles were established, producing hundreds of thousands of nets by early 1944. In Barellan, the Younger Set made "Housewife" sewing kits which were sent to servicemen. Many women members were already stretched, having been left to run the family farm while their husbands were away fighting.

In the postwar years the CWA took an interest in welcoming new migrants - meeting at least two ships a month and providing catering for 1000-2500 migrants at a time. They also helped families settle and invited women to branch meetings. Special services were set up for migrant women living in the Snowy Mountains. In the late 1950s some branches began to encourage Aboriginal women to join, although they have never been prominent among the membership.

Although the CWA has in many ways defended traditional gender roles, it has advocated a greater public role for country women. It has also been outspoken on environmental issues. The women of the CWA, while believing deeply that their role in the family is vitally important, have been initiators, fighters and lobbyists. They have made localities into communities by providing social activities and educational, recreational and medical facilities. . . "They are radicals, insisting on better community facilities, yet the conservative guardians of traditional values."

From the late 1960s the numerical strength and influence of the CWA began to decline, although there has been some recent revival. In 2004 the Association had over 13,000 members and 500 local branches.

=== The Barellan Branch of the CWA and its Rest Home ===
The Barellan Branch of the CWA was formed at a meeting on 15 August 1922 held in the Barellan School of Arts. Mrs G. Gow was elected president, Mrs Sullivan secretary, and Mrs Cracknell treasurer. It was the ninth branch to be formed in New South Wales.

Initially meetings were held monthly at Mrs Sullivan's home with an attendance of six to twelve. The decision to build the centre followed a motion by a Mrs Field at a meeting on 12 April 1923. A place of rest and refreshment was needed by women and their children while in town during their husband's business related town visits; Barellan at that time only had one seat in the main street and summer weather could be particularly trying. The construction of the building is also indicative of the town's rapid growth at that time in response to the mid-1920s wheat boom.

Throughout 1923 and 1924 the Barellan Branch of the CWA held socials, euchre parties, dances and a bazaar to help finance the building. Some locals attributed the success of these early functions to the fact that they tended to be held on evenings with a full moon so that those attending could drive their horses home safely at night. By November 1923 plans were ready to build a weatherboard Rest House at a cost of 650 pounds. The architect was G. W. A. Welch of Leeton who gave his services freely. The original cost of construction was 520 pounds and the contractors were probably Kinlock Brothers.

The July 1924 edition of Gow's Gazette stated: "These ladies are to be congratulated on being a lively body, On their own initiative they set to work and build the first Rest Rooms in NSW. They had no funds to start with so with a series of dances etc, they raised 400 pounds".

'By July 1924, the Rest House was ready for opening and members held a tea party to entertain all who had assisted with the erection of their meeting room. It was decided to serve afternoon tea to the public every Saturday afternoon to help pay off the remaining debt. The charge was sixpence (6d.) for members, nine pence (9d.) for non-members. In this way the building was cleared of debt by May 1929.'

Probably buoyed with their initial success, in May 1929 the Barellan Branch embarked on the greater project of building a hospital for the town - about six months before the stockmarket crash which marked the commencement of the Great Depression. Although a concrete hospital was erected by June 1930 and leased to a Dr Rutherford, it took many more years of hard work to pay off the building, helped by donations contributed from branches around NSW. Eventually in 1938 the hospital was handed over to the Hospitals Commission, to be administered by Griffith District Hospital. The building on Mulga Street is now occupied as a private residence.

In 1934 establishing an occasional Baby Health Centre in the building became a priority. Purchasing the necessary furniture from donations, the centre was officially opened on 9 October 1934. The centre, with a Nursing Sister in attendance twice monthly, was finally moved to the Community Health Centre during the 1980s.'

In December 1934 Barellan Branch also decided to form a Younger Set, inaugurated in March 1935. The Younger Set meeting room was added to the Rest House in 1941 at a cost of 31 pounds. This room is now part of the main meeting room. One of the major projects of Younger Set members was to raise money to purchase a piano for the parent branch at a cost of 317 pounds. The piano was proudly presented at the December meeting in 1953. In 2008 this piano was restored and repaired at a cost of $3000. The Younger set disbanded in 1963 owing to a decline in members.

'During the war years, members assisted the war effort, making camouflage nets, spinning wool, knitting socks and despatching pelts to the Sheepskin Vest committee. . . Over 500 articles were forwarded to the Comforts Fund.'

Barellan members were also interested in handicrafts, holding cake decoration schools and craft displays. They succeeded in winning group trophies on many occasions. There was also keen interest in group activities such as International and Cultural Days, and participation in The Land cookery contest. In 1995 the branch began publishing a Community Phone Book, which has been a successful fund raising initiative

The 50th anniversary of the Barellan Branch was celebrated in 1972 with a luncheon at the School of Arts, where the formative meeting had been held. Almost 200 members were present and a tree was planted in the Evonne Goolagong Park just to the east of the CWA Rest House, to commemorate the occasion (unfortunately, after a long drought this tree toppled onto one of the CWA chimney's during a storm in early 2011, luckily with little damage to the building - however the tree has been cut down to a stump). In 1988 the park adjacent to the Rest House was extended up to the western side of the building and named the Bicentennial Garden. Research conducted in this year by secretary Doreen Bewes-Pearson in 1988 confirmed that the Rest House was the first in Australia and a board was placed above the front entrance door to commemorate the 1924 opening of the Rest House. In 2002 the 80th birthday of the branch was celebrated at the Rest House, with many visitors and guests on the day. The 85th birthday of the branch was celebrated in 2007 with lunch at the Commercial Hotel.

The CWA Rest House has been extensively used by other local organisations over the years. In 1928 the Golf Club made it their headquarters. Since then Women's Bowls, Red Cross, Hospital Auxiliary, Senior Citizens, Far West Scheme, Lodges and the Show society have all held regular meetings there. In 1992 the Branch received a Sydney Morning Herald Community Service award for Narrandera Shire.

Membership of the Barellan Branch has varied from around 20 in the 1920s to around 80 in the 1940s and around 50 in the 1960s. There were 27 members in 2011.

Following research by secretary Doreen Bewes-Pearson in 1988, it was confirmed that the Rest House was the first to have been built in Australia, based on responses from each state branch of the CWA to the barellan branch's letter asking when their first rest house had been constructed. There was one rest room finished earlier, at Urana, but it was an existing room donated to the branch for their use, not a purpose-built CWA Rest House, since burnt down. A board was placed above the front entrance door to commemorate its opening in July 1924. In 2004 a larger sign was unveiled beside the Rest House in Bicentennial Garden, courtesy of the Narrandera Shire.

In 1988 the park adjacent to the CWA Rest House was extended to the eastern side of the building and named the Bicentennial Garden. The same year the meeting room was enlarged by removing a dividing wall. A plaque was unveiled, stating "Dedicated to our pioneer members by the members of 1988". A leather covered Honour Roll book was made. An amplifier system was installed in the meeting room. The members organised the erection of a street stall shelter which is used by community groups on regular basis.

During the past 15 years, Barellan CWA has received various grants, including an Australian Heritage Commission Grant. With money received, and the help of the local community, they have been able to replace the roof of the Rest House, paint and repair the building, lay new carpet, purchase and install new blinds and curtains. New chairs were obtained in 2007 while in 2008 pavers were laid to allow easier access to the Rest House.

=== George William Welch, architect ===
GWA Welch was born in 1887 in Hull, England and studied at the Royal Technical Institute at Salford in Lancashire 1908–11. He married Maude Hatcher in 1909 and migrated to Australia in 1912. He settled in Leeton where he worked on the construction of a pise church for the Anglicans; on sections of the cannery; dining room extensions at the Hydro Hotel; a new shop for H. Harmon now Wades Pharmacy and McGregors Newsagent; he designed St Mary's Convent (1926) and Richards & Co store (1938); was overseer for the Roxy Theatre and Wade Hotel (1930s). Early in the 1940s he moved with his family to Roseville in Sydney and became engaged in the war effort as a camouflage expert. After his son died in WWII he retired to Panania where he kept a small practice for local building works, ready to assist returned soldiers with their homes. He died in 1959, aged 79.

== Description ==
The building is located on a lot owned by the CWA of NSW and run by the Barellan Branch of the CWA.

The original structure built in 1924 was constructed in weatherboard with a gabled, corrugated iron roof and a verandah across the front and front sides of the building. The facilities initially included a large reading room, dressing room, store room and toilet.

The west side verandah was enclosed in 1941 to make a separate meeting room for the "Younger Set". In 1988 the dividing wall (originally the external wall to the west) between the main room and the Younger Set meeting room was removed, resulting in a single large, L-shaped meeting room. There is now also a kitchen, store room and toilet. There are two chimneys which were rebuilt in 1999 using an Australian Heritage Commission National Estates Grant. The interiors feature intact patterned ceilings and cornices.

Moveable heritage includes:

- Piano donated by Younger Set in 1953, restored 2008;
- Baby Health Centre relics including baby weigh scales, weighing child's chair, bassinet (the Barellan Branch of the CWA mentioned they are considering * giving these to the local museum where they can be more readily displayed to the public).
- 'CWA' tea cups and saucers dating from the 1930s.
- Trophies for cooking, craft and other activities.
- Framed black and white photograph of the CWA Rest House Barellan in its early days.
- Plaque dating from 1988 dedicated to pioneers.
- Honour Roll dating from 1988

The building was reported to be in good condition as at 15 August 2011, following conservation works carried out in 1999 under an Australian Heritage Commission National Estates Grant (consisting largely of conserving chimneys, replacing roof, painting interiors and exterior). A tree situated to the immediate east of the building was associated with the site for many years but unfortunately was uprooted in a storm in early 2011 and had to be removed.

=== Modifications and dates ===
- 1928: The back of the Rest House painted and a sign erected, "CWA Rest House".
- 1934: Baby Health Centre facilities are installed to allow for twice monthly clinics on the premises.
- 1936: A new kitchen, stove and chimney are added behind the east verandah.
- 1941: The west verandah is enclosed and clad in fibro to provide a room for "Younger Set" meetings.
- 1940s: A disability ramp is added to the front verandah.
- 1951: Electricity is connected.
- 1953: A piano is donated by the Younger Set after considerable fund-raising efforts.
- 1972: 50th anniversary celebrated with a tree planting in Evonne Goolagong Park.
- 1988: The park adjacent to the Rest House is extended up to the western side of the building and named the Bicentennial Garden. The main meeting room is enlarged by removing the dividing wall to the former "Younger Set" meeting room. A plaque is unveiled, stating "Dedicated to our pioneer members by the members of 1988". A leather covered Honour Roll book is made. Following research by secretary Doreen Bewes-Pearson in 1988, it was confirmed that the Rest House was the first in Australia and a board is placed above the front entrance door to commemorate the 1924 opening of the Rest House.
- Late 1970s: Amplifier system installed in the meeting room.
- 1993: The Rest House is added to the Register of the National Estate (Australian Heritage Commission)
- 1999: The roof is replaced, chimneys restored, exterior painted.
- 2000: Building interiors painted.
- 2001–02: New blinds installed in 2001 and curtains installed in 2002.
- 2004: New carpet laid.
- 2007: New chairs obtained.
- 2008: Piano is restored and repaired at a cost of $3000. Pavers are laid to allow easier access to the Rest House.

== Heritage listing ==
The Country Women's Association Rest House in Barellan, dating from July 1924, is of State significance for being one of the first "CWA rest houses" purpose-built by local country women in Australia. It is of State significance for its associations with the foundation years of this nationally important women's group which was formed in New South Wales in 1922 in order to "improve the conditions of women on the land". The building demonstrates various efforts made to meet the needs of country women and children. It is also of State significance for its representative role in providing an example of the facilities constructed and adapted for different community uses by a CWA branch throughout the twentieth century, usually as a result of local fundraising. It is representative of the enthusiasm that accompanied the formation of the CWA, demonstrated by the fact that by the time the Barellan Rest House was open in mid-1924 there were 120 branches, 4500 members and 20 rest rooms under construction.

The CWA Rest House in Barellan is likely to be of local significance for its aesthetic contribution to the streetscape as a historic weatherboard community facility and for its role in contributing to community life in the town throughout the twentieth century.

CWA Rest House was listed on the New South Wales State Heritage Register on 18 November 2011 having satisfied the following criteria.

The place is important in demonstrating the course, or pattern, of cultural or natural history in New South Wales.

The Country Women's Association Rest House in Barellan, opened in July 1924, is of State significance for being one of the first "CWA rest houses" purpose built by local country women in Australia. The building demonstrates various efforts made to meet the needs of country women and children, and to ameliorate the harsh living conditions of the bush.

The place has a strong or special association with a person, or group of persons, of importance of cultural or natural history of New South Wales's history.

The Country Women's Association Rest House in Barellan is of State significance for its associations with the early, foundation years of this important nationwide women's group which was formed in New South Wales in 1922 in order to "improve the conditions of women on the land".

The place is important in demonstrating aesthetic characteristics and/or a high degree of creative or technical achievement in New South Wales.

The Country Women's Association Rest House in Barellan is of local significance for its aesthetic contribution to the streetscape as a historic weatherboard community facility.

The place has a strong or special association with a particular community or cultural group in New South Wales for social, cultural or spiritual reasons.

The Country Women's Association Rest House in Barellan of local significance for its role in contributing to community life in the town throughout the twentieth century.

The place is important in demonstrating the principal characteristics of a class of cultural or natural places/environments in New South Wales.

The Country Women's Association Rest House in Barellan is of State significance for its representative role in providing an example of the facilities constructed by a CWA branch in the 1920s as a result of local fundraising and then adapted for different community uses throughout the twentieth century. It is representative of the enthusiasm that accompanied the formation of the CWA, demonstrated by the fact that by the time it was open in mid-1924 there were 120 branches, 4500 members and 20 rest rooms under construction.
