= Colinroobie =

- Town
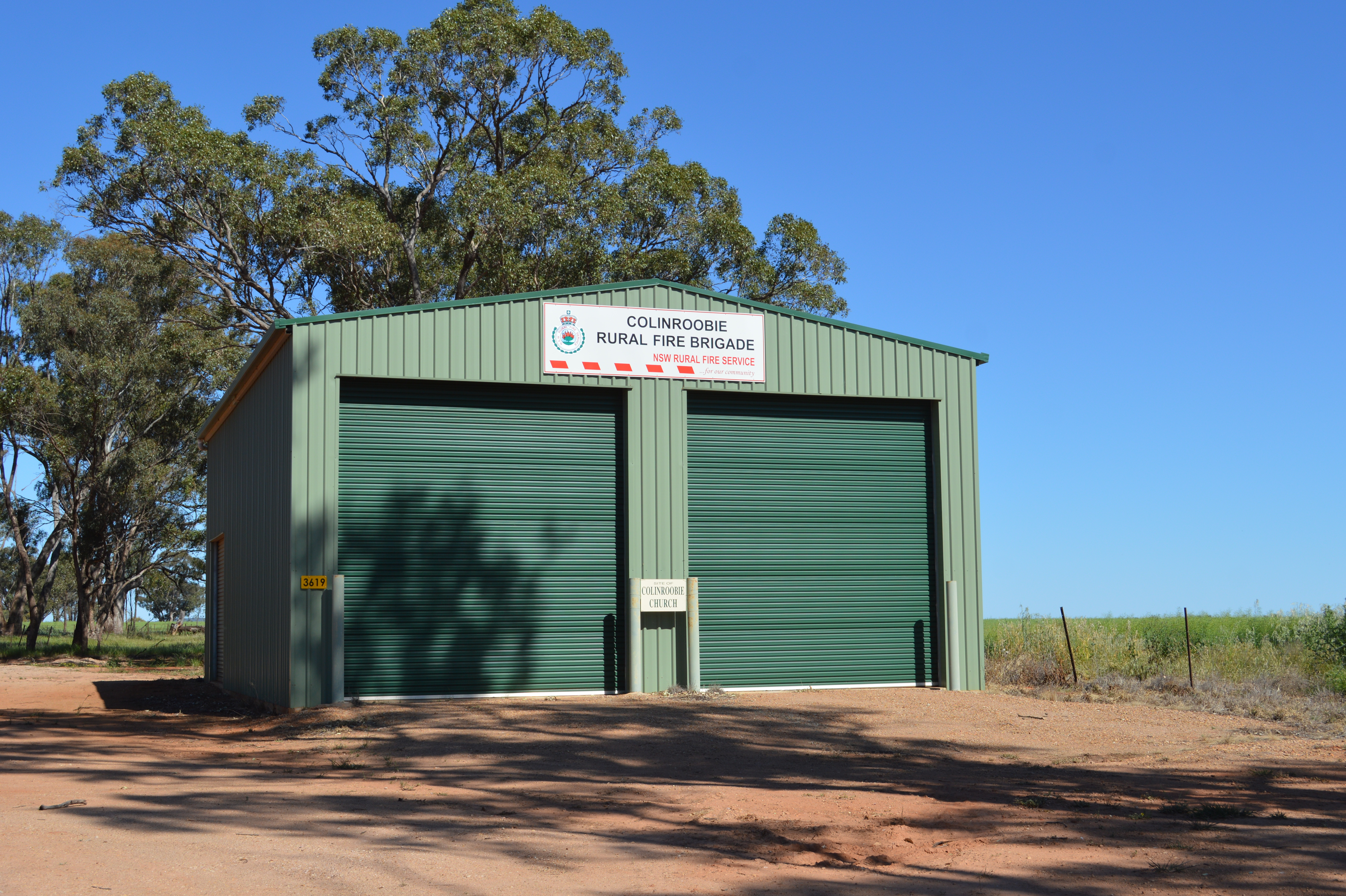
- Rural Fire Service shed

- Coordinates: 34°32′19″S 146°35′36″E
- Country: Australia
- State: New South Wales
- LGA: Narrandera Shire
- Location: 579 km (360 mi) from Sydney; 79 km (49 mi) from Griffith; 28 km (17 mi) from Barellan; 24 km (15 mi) from Narrandera

Government
  - State electorate: Cootamundra
  - Federal division: Farrer
- Elevation: 291 m (955 ft)

Population
  - Total: 51 (SAL 2021)
- Postcode: 2700
- County: Cooper

Colinroobie is a rural community in the central part of the Riverina in southern New South Wales, Australia. Previously referred to as Bents Hill its name was changed in January 2005.

It is situated by road, about 33 kilometres (21 mi) north of Narrandera and 27 kilometres (17 mi) south of Barellan.

Colinroobie Post Office opened on 5 November 1895 and closed in 1952.
