= 3 for Bedroom C =

1952 film by Milton H. Bren

Three for Bedroom "C"
- Theatrical release poster
- Directed by: Milton H. Bren
- Written by: Milton H. Bren
- Based on: Three for Bedroom "C" by Goddard Lieberson
- Produced by: Edward L. Alperson
- Starring: Gloria Swanson; James Warren; Fred Clark; Hans Conried; Margaret Dumont
- Cinematography: Ernest Laszlo
- Edited by: Arthur Hilton
- Music by: Heinz Roemheld
- Distributed by: Warner Bros. Pictures
- Release date: June 26, 1952
- Running time: 74 minutes
- Country: United States
- Language: English

Three for Bedroom "C" (sometimes written as 3 for Bedroom "C") is a 1952 American comedy film released by Warner Bros. Pictures. It was directed by Milton H. Bren, who also wrote the screenplay. The film stars Gloria Swanson as an aging movie star. Music by Heinz Roemheld.

== Plot ==
Ann Haven, an aging movie actress, receives an urgent wire demanding that she immediately return to Hollywood to star in a new film.

She is not thrilled with the idea, but decides to go anyway. She plans to leave New York for Los Angeles by train, bringing along her bold young daughter, Barbara.

Unfortunately, the train is full so they have no choice but to stow away in a sleeping compartment. The berth belongs to a shy and introverted biochemistry professor from Harvard, Ollie J. Thrumm. He ends up boarding the train in Chicago. Romance and complications ensue — including havoc from Ann's agent Johnny Pizer.

== Cast ==
- Gloria Swanson as Ann Haven
- James Warren as Professor Ollie J. Thruman
- Fred Clark as Johnny Pizer
- Hans Conried as Press agent Jack Bleck
- Steve Brodie as Conde Marlowe
- Janine Perreau as Barbara Haven
- Margaret Dumont as Mrs. Agnes Hawthorne
- Ernest Anderson as Railroad Porter (uncredited)

== Background ==
Riding high after the critical and financial success of Sunset Boulevard (1950), Swanson was offered more film roles. According to her, they were all pale imitations of Norma Desmond, her character in the hit film.

Reluctant to accept the roles, in fear of being typecast as a faded actress, she agreed to be in Three for Bedroom "C" because it offered something different — it was a comedy. This was her first film in color, and she was also costume designer for the project. Swanson hoped to duplicate her previous success. Unfortunately, the film underperformed with critics and with audiences.
