= Ernest Anderson =

Ernest Anderson may refer to:

== Entertainment ==
- Ernest Anderson (actor) (1915–2011), American film actor
- Ernie Anderson (1923–1997), American voice actor
- Ernest Anderson III, American jazz guitarist and bassist

== Sports ==
- Ernest Anderson (American football) (born 1960), American football running back
- Ernest Anderson (footballer) (1877–1943), Australian rules footballer
- Ernie Anderson (ice hockey) (1898–1977), Canadian ice hockey player

== Others ==
- Ernest Anderson (bishop) (1859–1945), Anglican bishop of Riverina, New South Wales, Australia
- Ernest P. Anderson (1897–1955), American businessman and politician
- Ernest Anderson (Minnesota politician) (1902–1992), American farmer and politician
- Ernest Masson Anderson (1877–1960), Scottish geologist

== See also ==
- Earnest Andersson (1878–1943), American polymath
