= Commercial Hotel (Wadena, Minnesota) =

- U.S. National Register of Historic Places
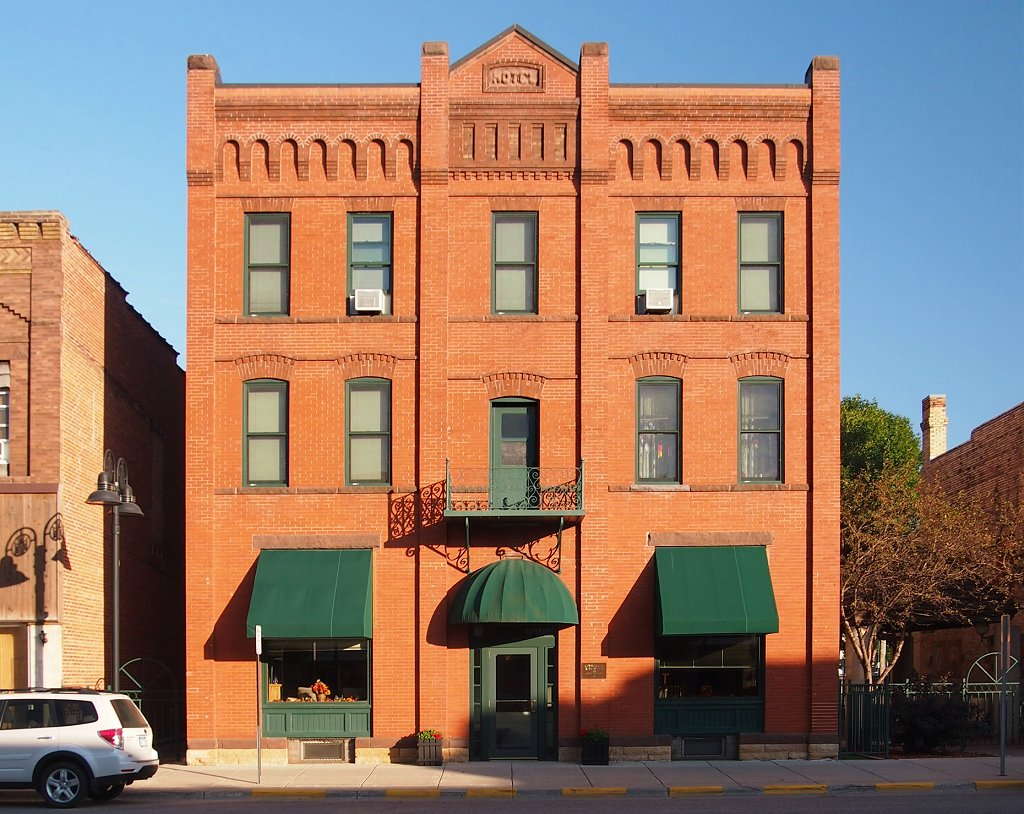
- The Commercial Hotel from the northwest

- Location within Minnesota Location within the United States
- Location: 218 Jefferson Street South, Wadena, Minnesota
- Coordinates: 46°26′22.5″N 95°8′15.5″W
- Area: Less than one acre
- Built: c. 1885, c. 1925
- Built by: William King
- Architectural style: Commercial Queen Anne
- NRHP reference No.: 88003010
- Designated: December 22, 1988

The former Commercial Hotel is a historic hotel building in Wadena, Minnesota, United States, built circa 1885. It was listed on the National Register of Historic Places in 1988 for having local significance in the theme of commerce. It was nominated for being an excellent example of the lodging facilities built in anticipation of Wadena's late-19th-century economic growth.

== Description ==
The Commercial Hotel is a three-story brick building on Wadena's main commercial street. Part of the coursed stone foundation is visible, punctuated by two small basement windows. Pilasters flank the centrally placed entrance and rise the full height of the façade. The slightly recessed entrance has five-panel sidelights and a fanlight. The bays on either side of the door each contain a large window with decorated panels below and a transom topped with a stone lintel above. The second story has four sash windows with stone windowsills and decorative brick arches highlighted by a string course. The windows of the third floor have stone sills like the second floor but flat brick lintels. Above this are panels and pilasters of corbelled brick. At the center of the cornice is a gable projection sporting a stone that is carved with the word "HOTEL".

The building originally occupied only half of its long, narrow lot. However a three-story addition around 1925 extended the building to the rear. The addition closely matches the original wing in scale and fenestration.

The layout of the ground floor originally consisted of a parlor and office facing the street, beyond which was a large dining room, and a kitchen at the rear.

== History ==
By 1881 Wadena had become a substantial town of about a thousand residents, but possessed only one hotel. Around 1885, though, the Commercial Hotel opened, despite being three and a half blocks from the Wadena Depot while its competitor was directly across the railroad tracks. The new hotel, however, was built of brick rather than the more common—and flammable—wood, lending itself an advantageous reputation as a more modern facility. In fact when Wadena's worst fire struck in 1888, 18 buildings were destroyed but the Commercial Hotel survived.

In 1901 an English immigrant named Joseph Askew purchased the hotel. He also served in local politics but died in an accident ten years later. Askew's widow and two daughters continued operating the hotel, doubling it in size around 1925 with the rear addition. This greatly increased the Commercial Hotel's popularity, and its distance from the train station was mitigated by its central location in Wadena's main business district and proximity to other transportation corridors. Many of the hotel's guests were traveling salesmen.

At the time of the building's nomination to the National Register in 1987 it had been vacant "for many years" but was being acquired by the city of Wadena for adaptive reuse as senior housing. This long period of vacancy, however, was credited with leaving the Commercial Hotel as one of the least altered late-19th/early-20th-century buildings in downtown Wadena.

== See also ==
- National Register of Historic Places listings in Wadena County, Minnesota
