= Wadena, Minnesota =

City in Minnesota, United States

Wadena
- City
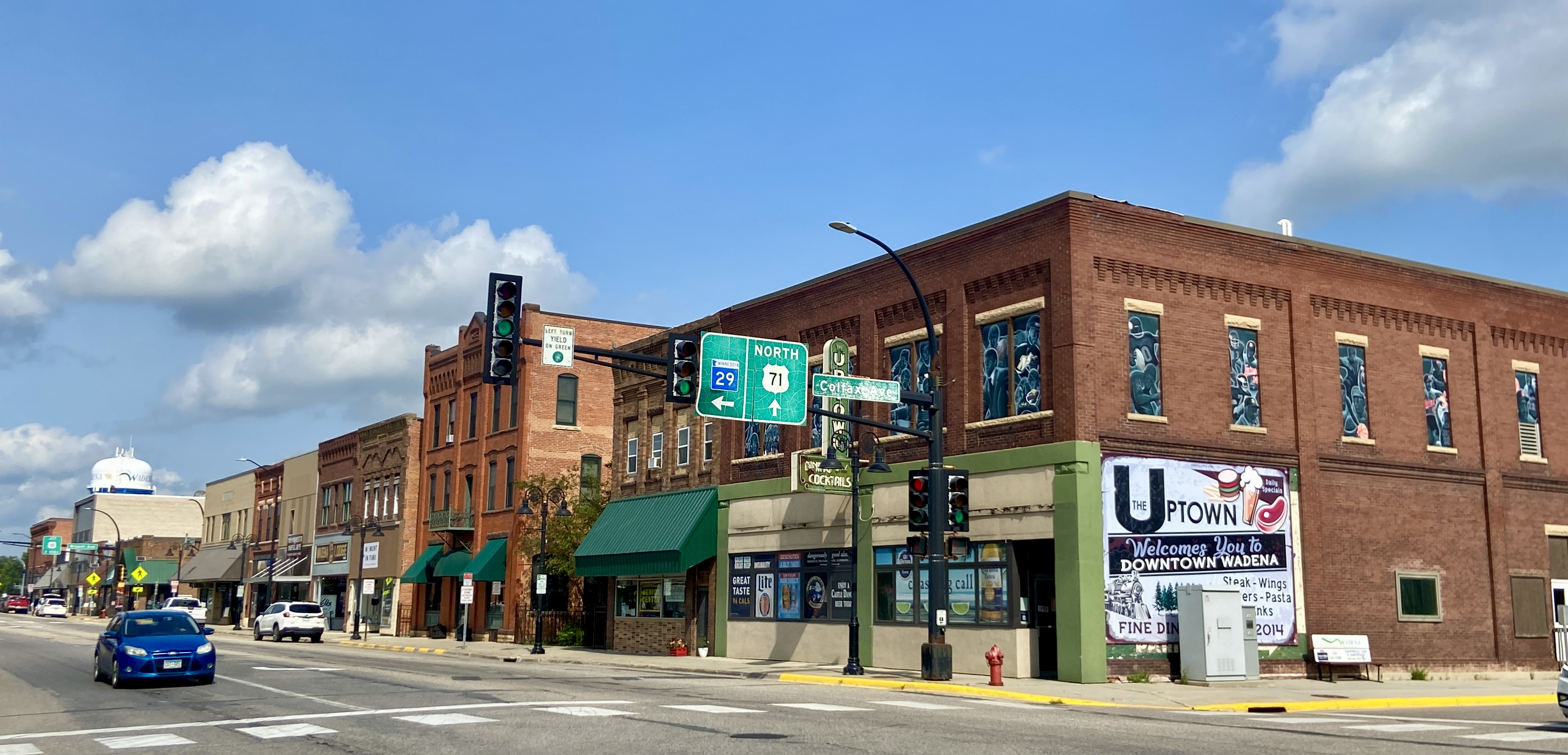
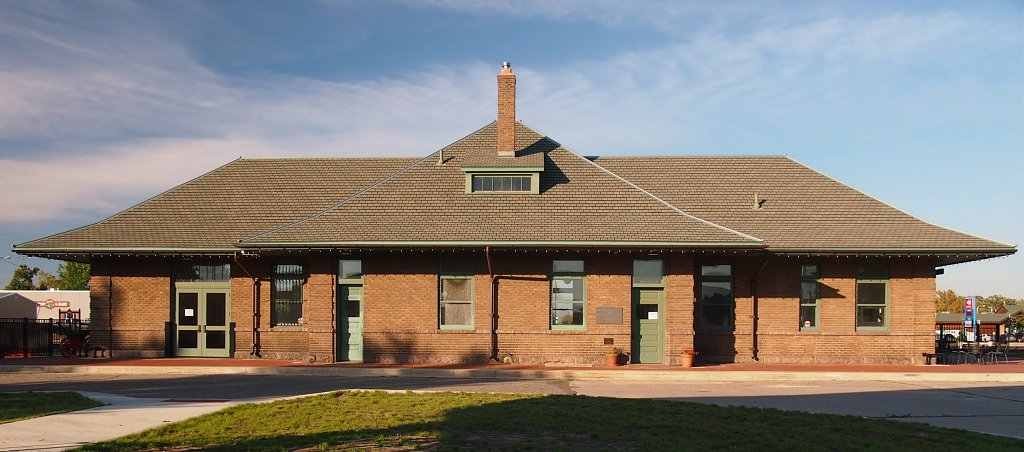
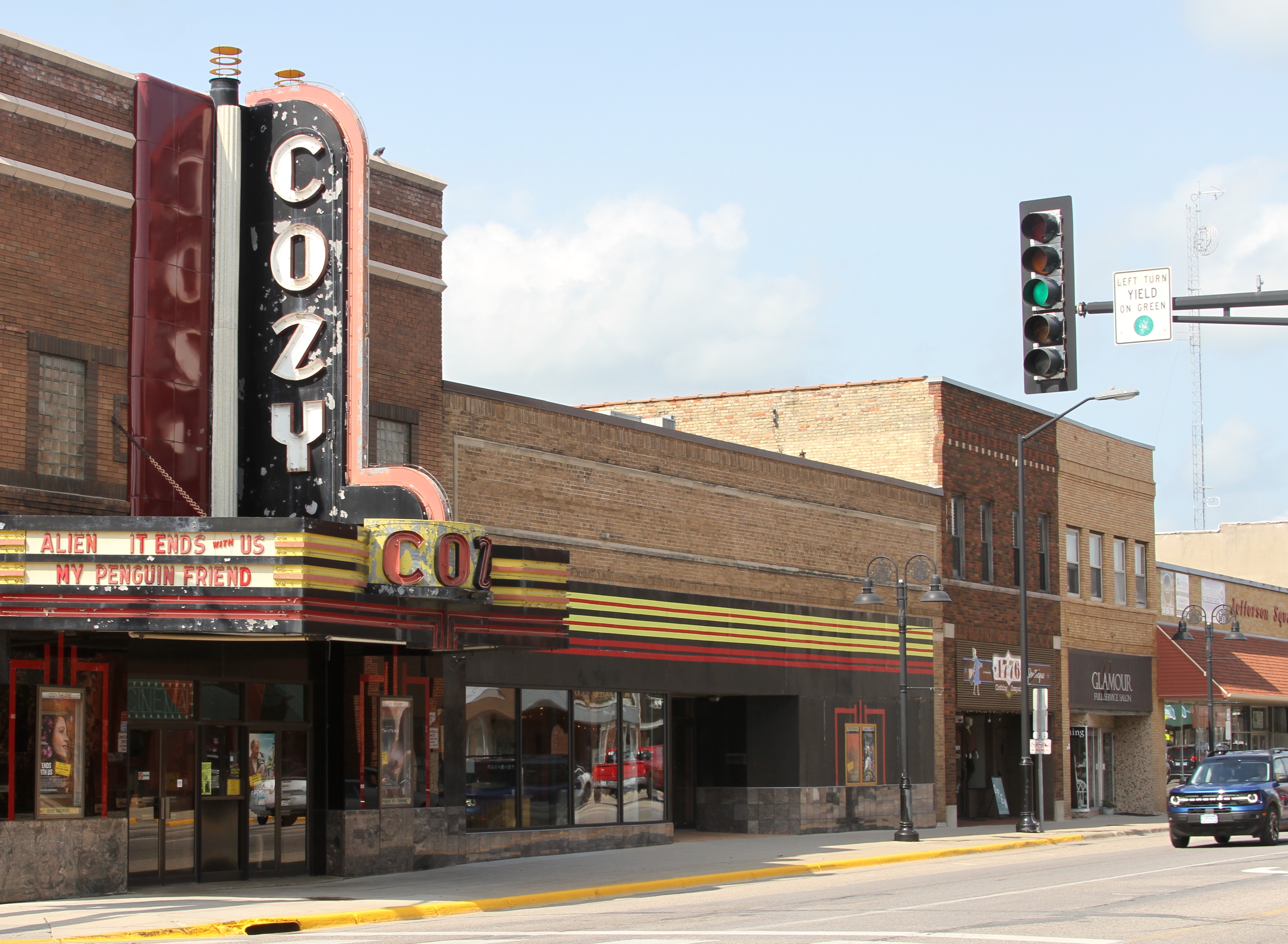
- Jefferson Street at Colfax Avenue Wadena Depot Cozy Theater

- Location of the city of Wadena within Wadena County, Minnesota
- Coordinates: 46°26′42″N 95°07′42″W
- Country: United States
- State: Minnesota
- Counties: Wadena, Otter Tail
- Founded: 1871
- Incorporated: 1881

Area
  - Total: 5.38 sq mi (13.93 km^{2})
  - Land: 5.38 sq mi (13.93 km^{2})
  - Water: 0.0039 sq mi (0.01 km^{2})
- Elevation: 1,339 ft (408 m)

Population (2020)
  - Total: 4,325
  - Estimate (2021): 4,335
  - Density: 804.3/sq mi (310.54/km^{2})
- Time zone: UTC-6 (CST)
  - Summer (DST): UTC-5 (CDT)
- ZIP code: 56482
- Area code: 218
- FIPS code: 27-67504
- GNIS feature ID: 2397160
- Website: wadena.org

Wadena (/wəˈdiːnə/ wə-DEEN-ə) is a city in Otter Tail and Wadena counties in the state of Minnesota. It is about one hundred sixty miles northwest of the Minneapolis – Saint Paul metro area. The population was 4,325 at the 2020 census. It is the county seat of Wadena County.

Wadena is an agricultural community and serves as a region hub for the Tri county area. Wadena is located at the crossroads of Highway 10 and Highway 71.

== History ==
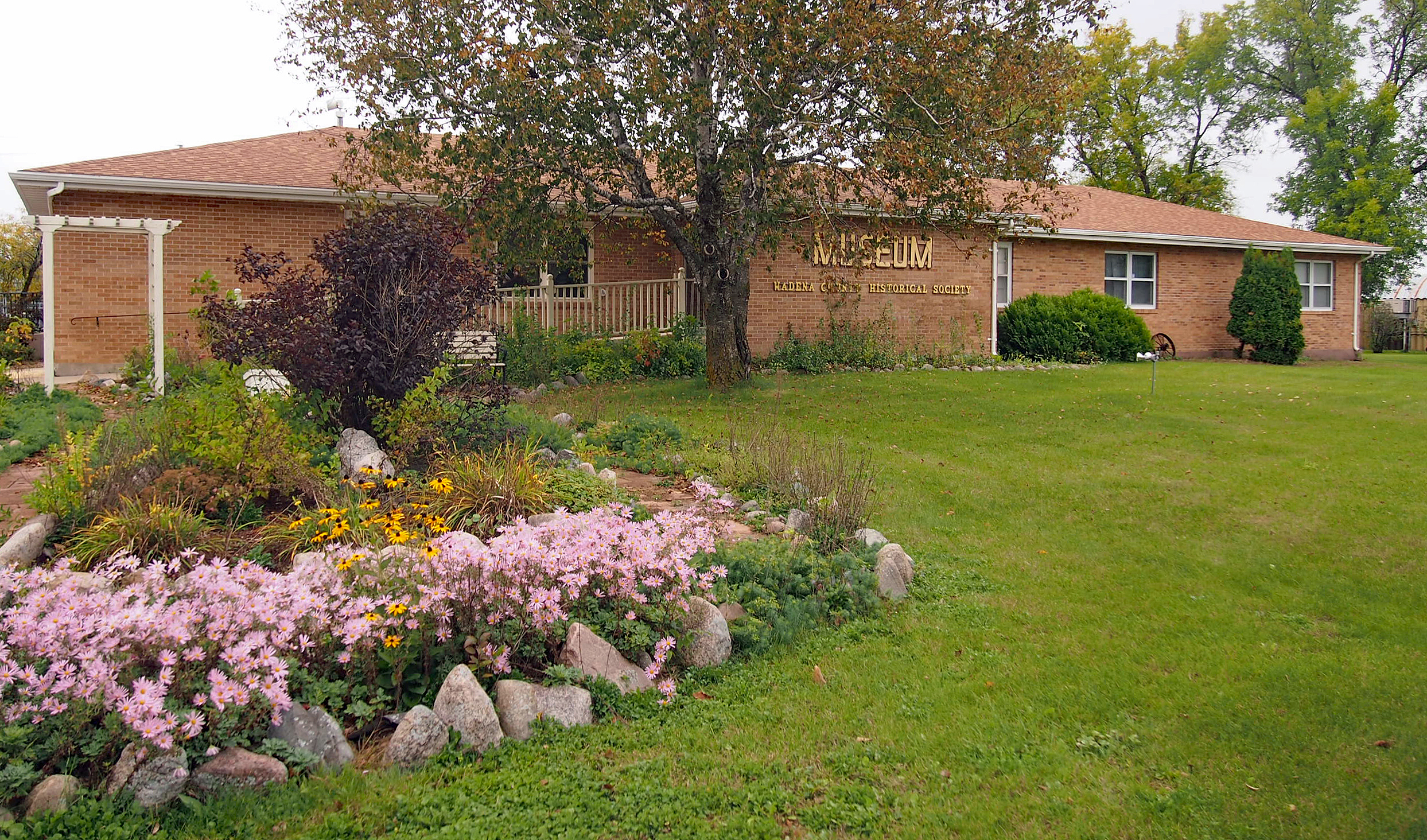
Wadena County Historical Society Museum

The first permanent settlement at Wadena was made in 1871. The city is named after Chief Wadena, an Ojibwe Indian chief of the late 19th century in northwestern Minnesota. A post office has been in operation at Wadena since 1873. Wadena was incorporated in 1881. Four properties in Wadena are listed on the National Register of Historic Places: the Commercial Hotel built circa 1885, the Wadena Fire and City Hall built in 1912, the Northern Pacific Passenger Depot built in 1915, and the Peterson-Biddick Seed and Feed Company built 1916–1936.

=== 2010 tornado ===
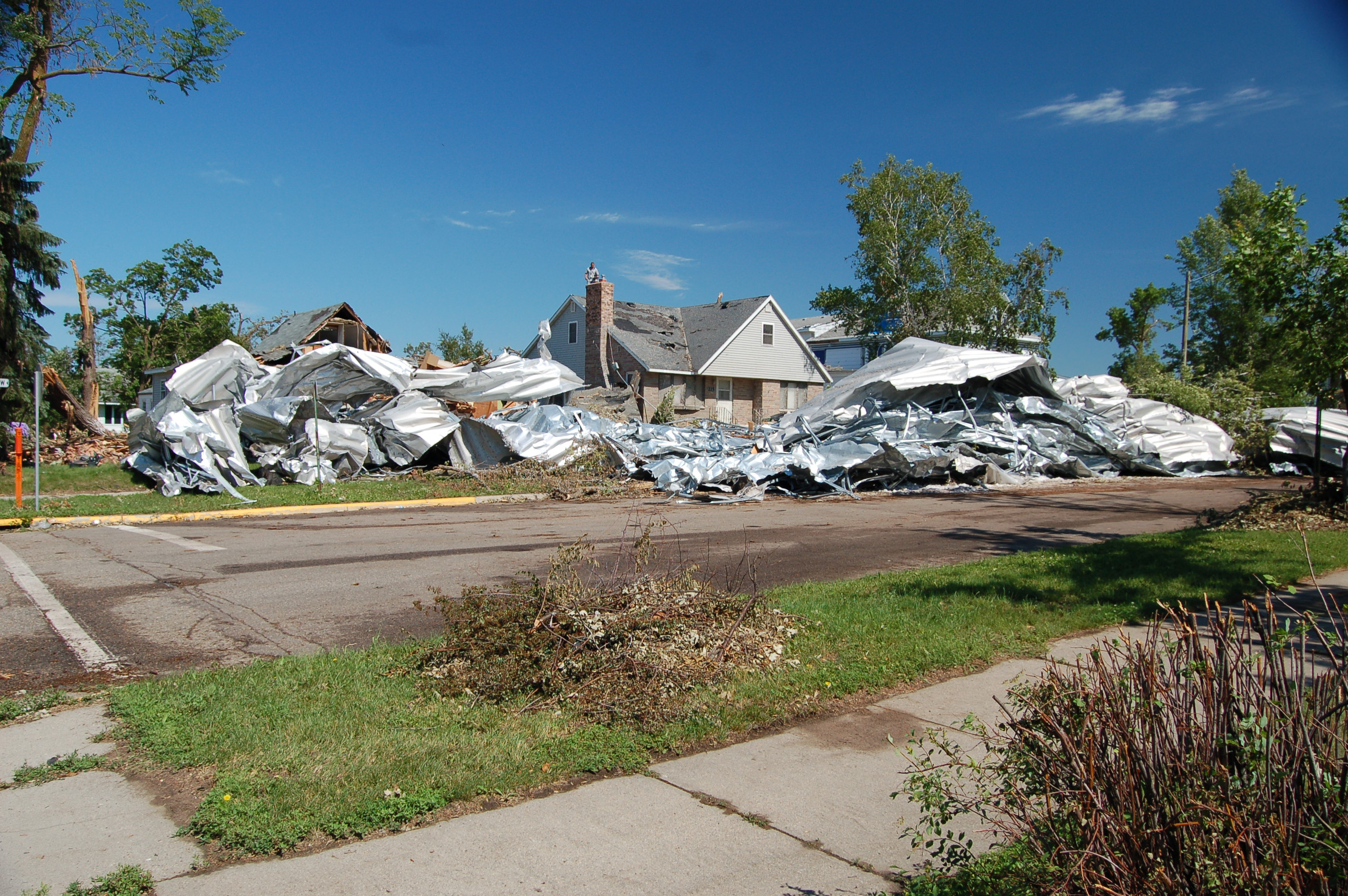
Damage from the tornado

On June 17, 2010, Wadena was hit by a damaging EF4 tornado. tornado that cut a quarter-mile-wide path of destruction through the town. The Wadena tornado was part of the largest single day tornado outbreak in Minnesota state history, 48 tornados were recorded that day. The tornado that struck Wadena was over a mile wide at its peak, packed winds of up to 170 miles per hour, and was on the ground for about 10 miles. At least 232 homes were damaged in the city accounting for roughly 30% of homes in the city. Though no one in the town was killed, 34 people were treated for injuries at local hospitals. The Community Center was damaged "beyond repair", and the high school was also severely damaged. Both were later torn down and rebuilt. The city continues to recover with roughly 20 lots abandoned throughout the city. City officials are encouraging rebuilding by offering tax free land incentives. The Wadena Tornado was covered extensively on the December 1, 2010, episode of the Discovery Channel series Storm Chasers.

In the aftermath of the tornado, students from the high school attended classes at the Wadena campus of Minnesota State Community and Technical College, at a school that was previously no longer in use in nearby Deer Creek (Deer Creek having consolidated with Wadena in 1991), and at the Wadena Elementary School. In order to accommodate the high school students, some early childhood classes at the Elementary School were further moved to Saint Ann's Catholic School. Outdoor athletics were largely unaffected, but home volleyball and basketball games were played in the Elementary School gymnasium. In fall of 2012, a new Middle-High School was opened.

== Geography ==
According to the United States Census Bureau, the city has a total area of 5.38 square miles (13.93 km^{2}), all of it land.

U.S. Highways 10 and 71 and Minnesota State Highway 29 are three of the main routes in the city.

== Demographics ==
Historical population
Census	Pop.	Note	%±
1880	307		—
1890	895		191.5%
1900	1,520		69.8%
1910	1,820		19.7%
1920	2,186		20.1%
1930	2,512		14.9%
1940	2,916		16.1%
1950	3,958		35.7%
1960	4,381		10.7%
1970	4,640		5.9%
1980	4,699		1.3%
1990	4,131		−12.1%
2000	4,294		3.9%
2010	4,088		−4.8%
2020	4,325		5.8%
2021 (est.)	4,335		0.2%
U.S. Decennial Census; 2020 Census

=== 2020 census ===
As of the 2020 census, Wadena had a population of 4,325. The median age was 39.7 years. 25.2% of residents were under the age of 18 and 22.8% of residents were 65 years of age or older. For every 100 females there were 90.8 males, and for every 100 females age 18 and over there were 86.9 males age 18 and over.

94.0% of residents lived in urban areas, while 6.0% lived in rural areas.

There were 1,917 households in Wadena, of which 25.6% had children under the age of 18 living in them. Of all households, 35.9% were married-couple households, 21.7% were households with a male householder and no spouse or partner present, and 34.9% were households with a female householder and no spouse or partner present. About 43.4% of all households were made up of individuals and 21.3% had someone living alone who was 65 years of age or older.

There were 2,132 housing units, of which 10.1% were vacant. The homeowner vacancy rate was 2.4% and the rental vacancy rate was 10.0%.

Racial composition as of the 2020 census
Race	Number	Percent
White	3,931	90.9%
Black or African American	70	1.6%
American Indian and Alaska Native	39	0.9%
Asian	31	0.7%
Native Hawaiian and Other Pacific Islander	5	0.1%
Some other race	41	0.9%
Two or more races	208	4.8%
Hispanic or Latino (of any race)	121	2.8%

=== 2010 census ===
As of the census of 2010, there were 4,088 people, 1,840 households, and 1,013 families living in the city. The population density was 759.9 inhabitants per square mile (293.4/km^{2}). There were 2,010 housing units at an average density of 373.6 per square mile (144.2/km^{2}). The racial makeup of the city was 95.6% White, 1.6% African American, 0.3% Native American, 0.4% Asian, 0.2% from other races, and 1.8% from two or more races. Hispanic or Latino of any race were 1.4% of the population.

There were 1,840 households, of which 26.3% had children under the age of 18 living with them, 39.0% were married couples living together, 11.7% had a female householder with no husband present, 4.3% had a male householder with no wife present, and 44.9% were non-families. 40.2% of all households were made up of individuals, and 20.1% had someone living alone who was 65 years of age or older. The average household size was 2.14 and the average family size was 2.86.

The median age in the city was 42 years. 22.1% of residents were under the age of 18; 9.5% were between the ages of 18 and 24; 21% were from 25 to 44; 24.3% were from 45 to 64; and 23% were 65 years of age or older. The gender makeup of the city was 47.3% male and 52.7% female.

=== 2000 census ===
As of the census of 2000, there were 4,294 people, 1,871 households, and 1,062 families living in the city. The population density was 818.4 inhabitants per square mile (316.0/km^{2}). There were 1,964 housing units at an average density of 374.3 per square mile (144.5/km^{2}). The racial makeup of the city was 97.88% White, 0.84% African American, 0.28% Native American, 0.19% Asian, 0.02% Pacific Islander, 0.16% from other races, and 0.63% from two or more races. Hispanic or Latino of any race were 0.61% of the population.

There were 1,871 households, out of which 25.4% had children under the age of 18 living with them, 44.6% were married couples living together, 9.2% had a female householder with no husband present, and 43.2% were non-families. 37.8% of all households were made up of individuals, and 20.3% had someone living alone who was 65 years of age or older. The average household size was 2.20 and the average family size was 2.92.

In the city, the population was spread out, with 23.4% under the age of 18, 10.2% from 18 to 24, 22.1% from 25 to 44, 20.2% from 45 to 64, and 24.1% who were 65 years of age or older. The median age was 41 years. For every 100 females, there were 90.9 males. For every 100 females age 18 and over, there were 84.7 males.

The median income for a household in the city was $26,947, and the median income for a family was $39,511. Males had a median income of $28,286 versus $21,297 for females. The per capita income for the city was $15,452. About 10.3% of families and 15.6% of the population were below the poverty line, including 15.9% of those under age 18 and 13.4% of those age 65 or over.

== Media ==
=== Television ===
Wadena is served by three local TV stations:

- KCCW Ch. 12 CBS (Walker)
- KAWB Ch. 22 PBS (Brainerd)
- KSAX Ch. 42 ABC (Alexandria)

The local cable TV providers are Spectrum Cable and Arvig Communications.

=== Radio ===
Wadena is served by three local radio stations:

Radio stations
Frequency	Call sign	Name	Format	Owner
920 kHz	KWAD	Classic Hit Country	Classic country	Hubbard Broadcasting
1430 kHz	KNSP	The Fan	Sports radio	Hubbard Broadcasting
105.9 MHz	KKWS	Superstation K106	Country music	Hubbard Broadcasting

=== Newspapers ===
- Wadena Pioneer Journal

== Arts and culture ==
With over 100 hand-painted murals decorating downtown buildings, Wadena depicts 1,000 years of Minnesota history known as the "Largest Puzzle in the World". The Alley Arts Committee beautified the alleys while creating an interesting tourist attraction. Over 40 artists worked together to finish the collection of 100 puzzle panels. Group guided tours are available along with a map at the train depot.

During the 2015 Christmas season, Wisconsin-based group Freedom From Religion threatened legal action against the city of Wadena over the display of a city-owned nativity in a city park. To avoid a lawsuit, the city sold the nativity to a private buyer who was able to feature it in an even more prominent, privately owned location. As a result of the actions of the Freedom From Religion, many nativity scenes sprang up around the city, estimated to be over 1,000 in total. The former site of the city-owned nativity was rented out a day at a time by individuals who were legally able to display a nativity. The story captured the attention of national media outlets.

Wadena is home to the Cozy Theatre, which in addition to showing contemporary films, hosts a film festival.

== Economy ==
The city's economy is largely driven by a mix of manufacturing, agriculture, and small businesses, which collectively contribute to its growth and resilience. Wadena is home to several trucking logistics companies as its strategic location along major transportation routes, facilitates the distribution of goods and services. The manufacturing sector in Wadena encompasses a range of businesses, including laser machinery manufacturing and outdoor furniture.

== Notable people ==
- Don A. Anderson, businessman and Minnesota state legislator
- Ernest P. Anderson, businessman and Minnesota state legislator
- Frank C. Mars, founder of Mars, Incorporated, was born in Hancock, Minnesota but lived in Wadena around the time of his son Forrest's birth in 1904.
- Forrest Mars Sr., son of Frank C. Mars and eventual owner of Mars, Incorporated and M&M's, was born in Wadena but moved away as a child.
- Jack McBride, Alaskan legislator, born in Wadena

== Transportation ==
Amtrak’s Empire Builder, which operates between Seattle/Portland and Chicago, passes through the town on BNSF tracks, but makes no stop. The nearest station is located in Staples, 18 miles (29 km) to the southeast.

== Images ==
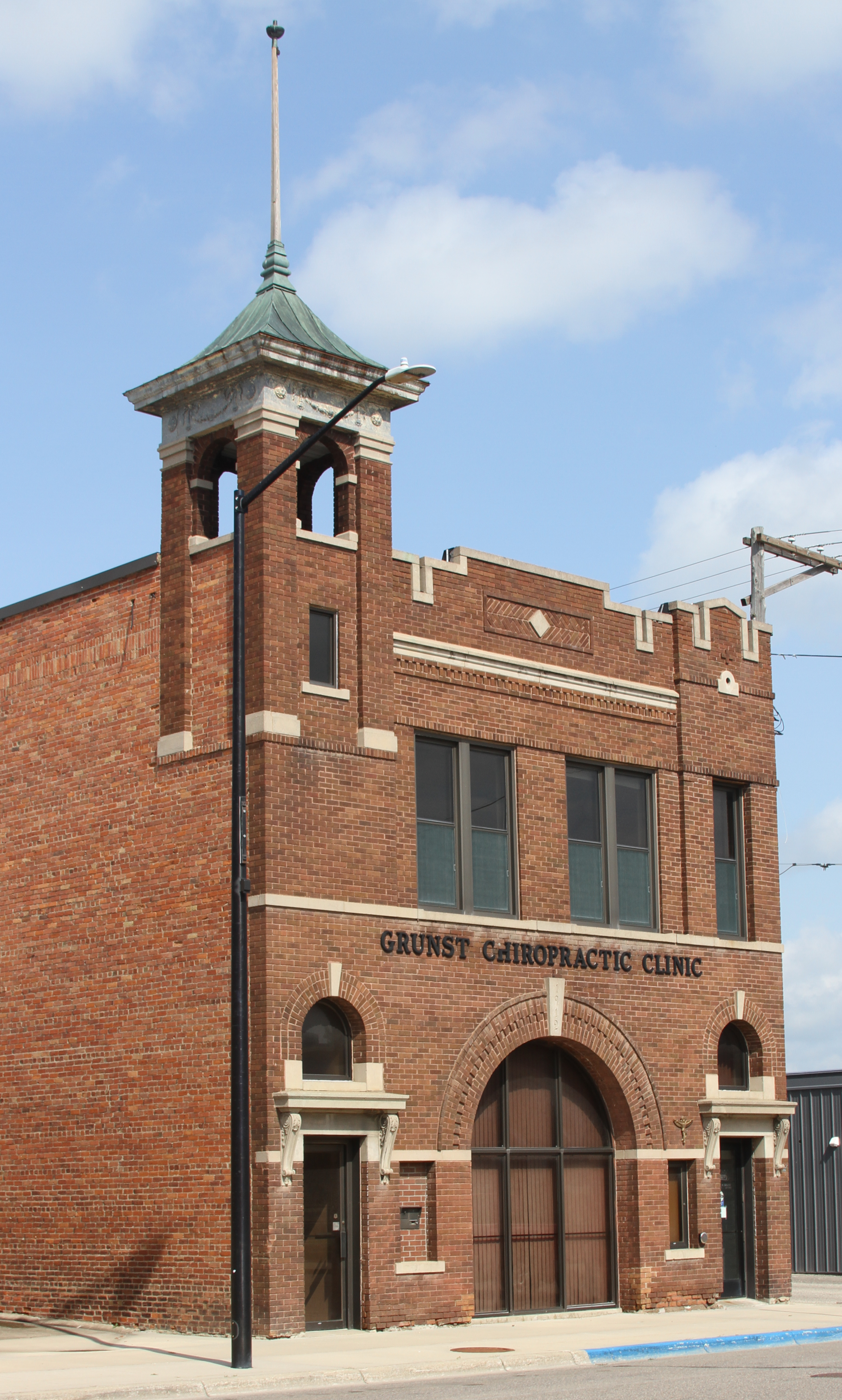
Old Fire and City Hall

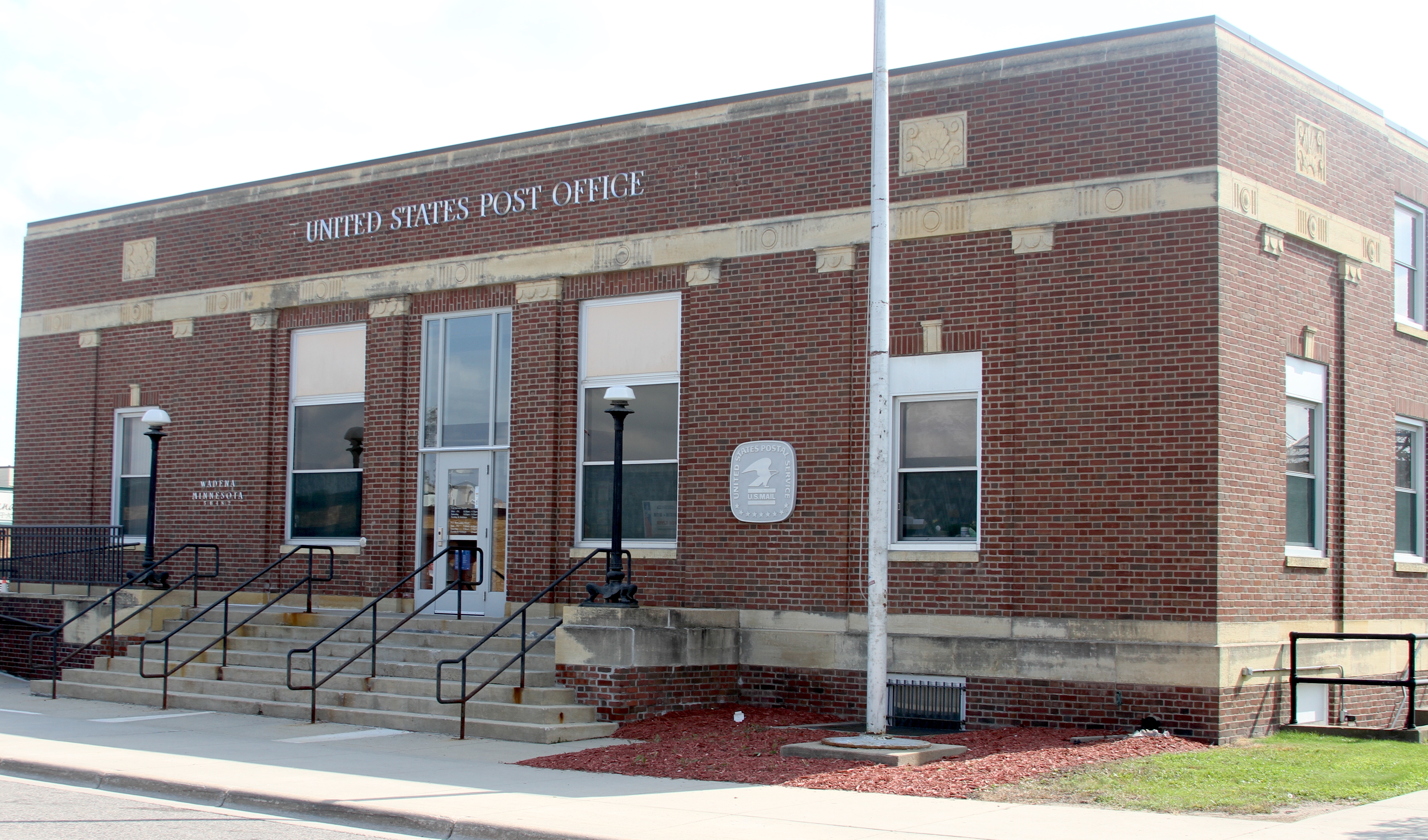
Post Office

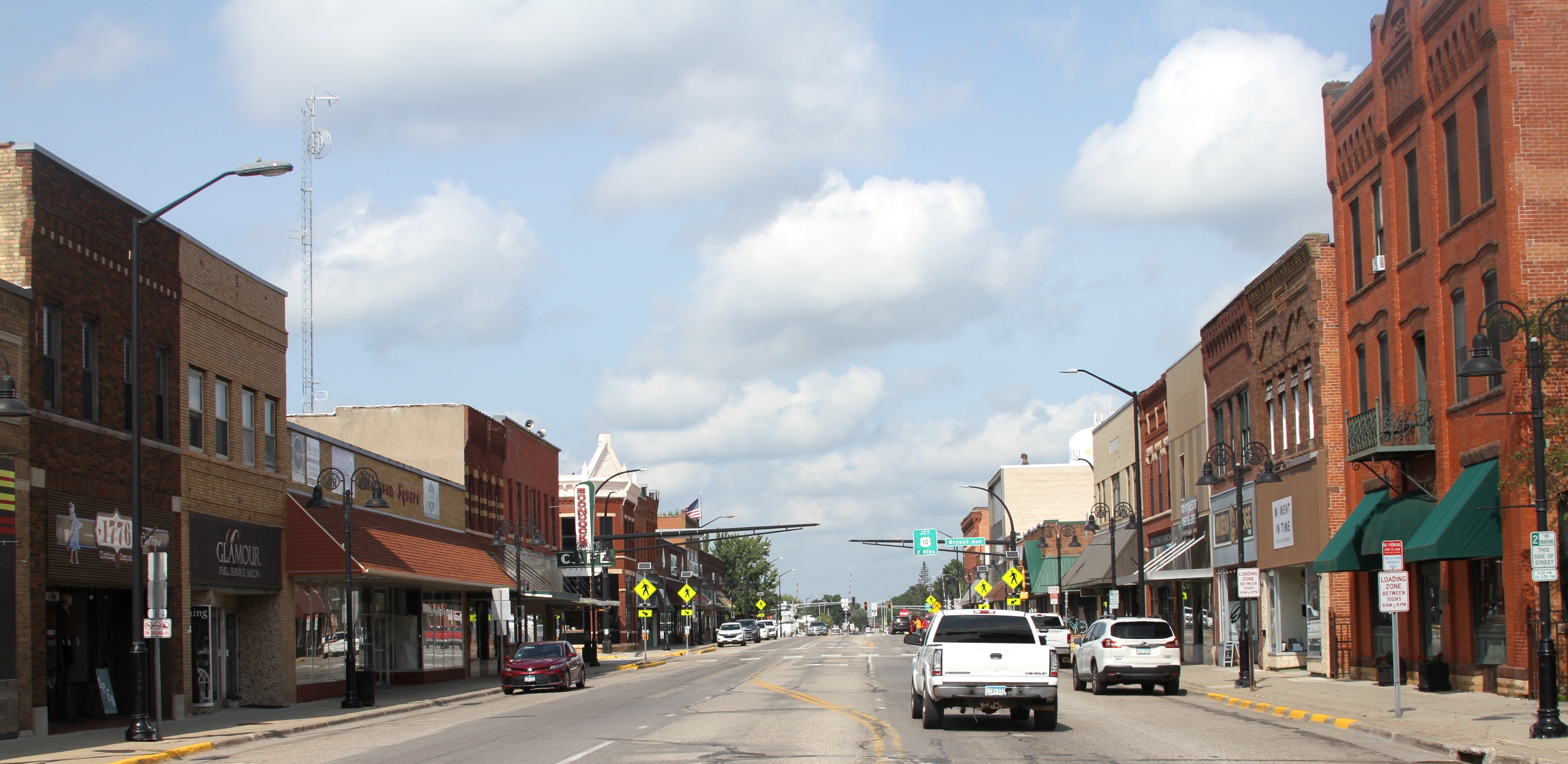
Jefferson Street looking N at Bryant Avenue

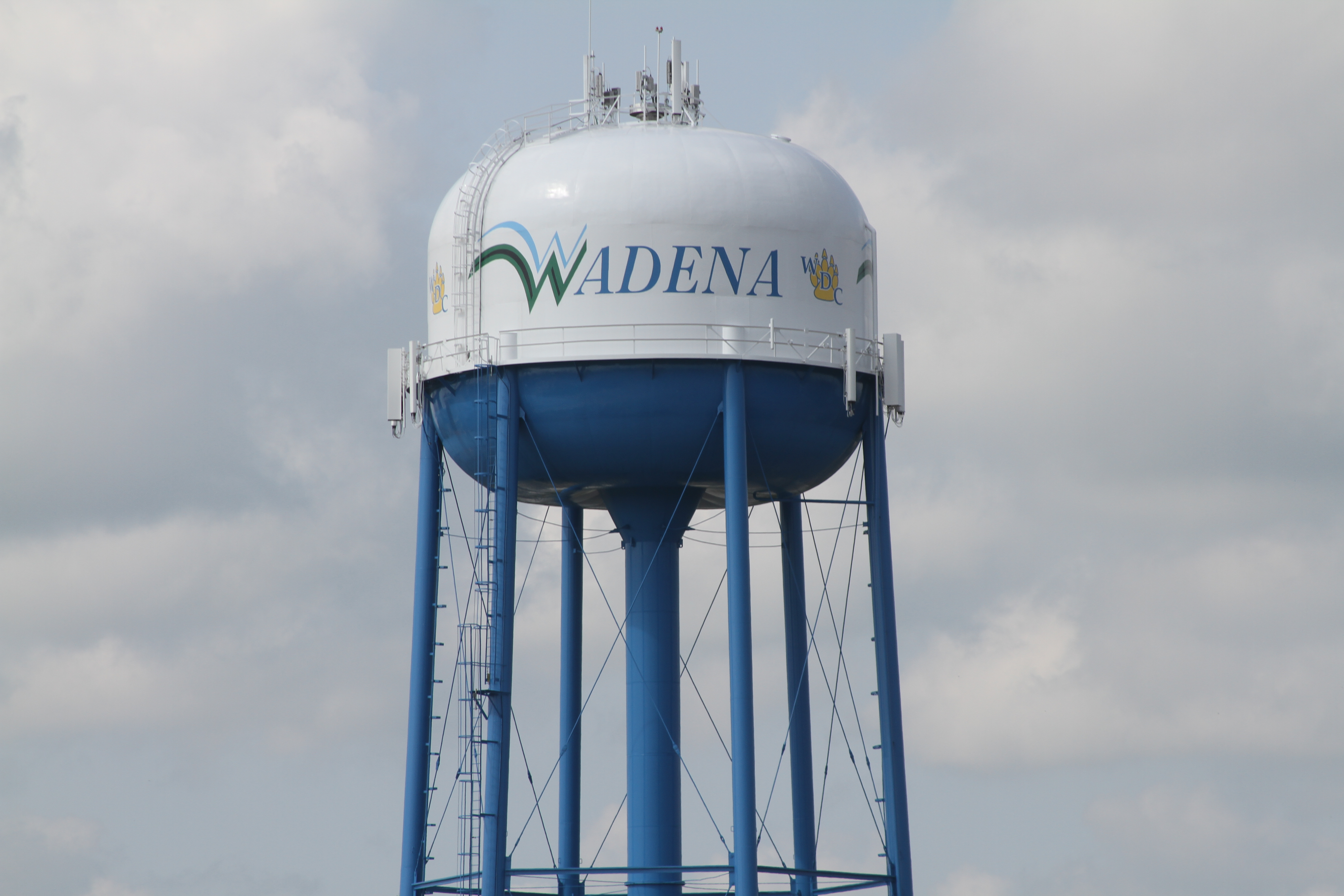
Water tower
