= Commercial Hotel, Fremantle =

Historic pub/hotel in Fremantle, Australia

Commercial Hotel
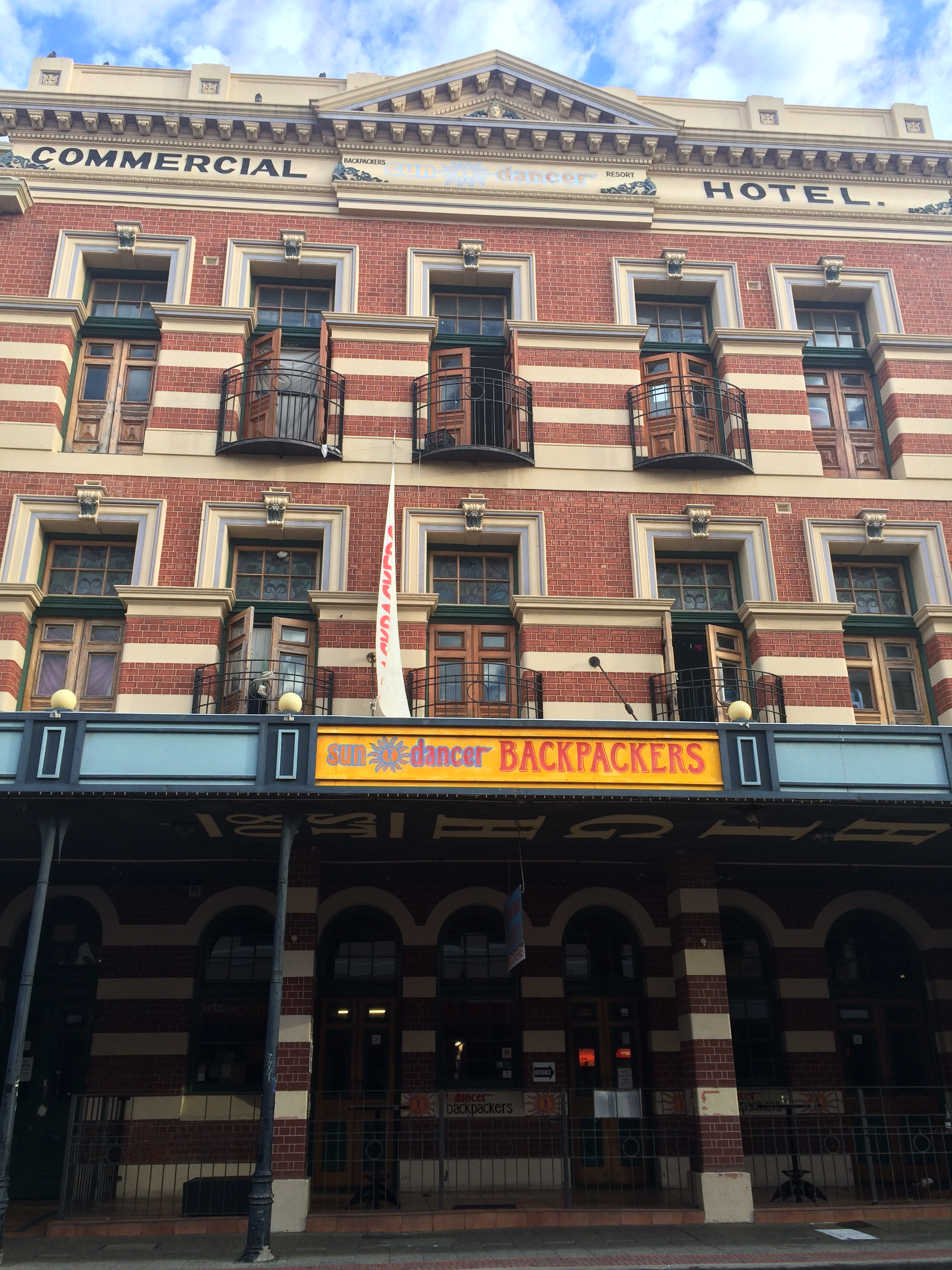
- Commercial Hotel in 2017
- Interactive map of the Commercial Hotel area
- Former names: Albert Hotel; Southern Cross Hotel; Sundancer Backpackers Hostel

General information
- Architectural style: Inter-War Free Classical style
- Location: 80 High Street, Fremantle, Western Australia
- Coordinates: 32.05461°S 115.74537°E
- Completed: 1840
- Renovated: 1908

Height
- Architectural: Federation Free Classic

Technical details
- Floor count: 3

Design and construction
- Architect: John McNeece
- Architecture firm: John McNeece and son

Website
- sundancerbackpackers.com

Western Australia Heritage Register
- Type: State Registered Place
- Designated: 1
- Part of: West End, Fremantle (25225)
- Reference no.: 921

The Commercial Hotel is a hotel at 80 High Street in Fremantle, Western Australia. The current building is of three storeys in the Federation Free Classic style, and was registered on the Register of the National Estate in 1978. It is now the Sundancers Backpackers Hostel.

== History ==
In 1840 Captain John Thomas built the Southern Cross Hotel, and his wife managed it while he was away at sea. It was later renamed the Albert Hotel and then later the Commercial Hotel.

In 1891 the publican of the Commercial Hotel was E. Jonas.

The hotel was re-built in 1908, and possibly renovated the same year. At this time, a number of other old buildings in nearby lots were being demolished – a newspaper of 1907 reports that:

Fremantle's 'rat castles' and microbe homes are gradually coming down. Some have already been erased, and the 'rodents' resort' next the Commercial Hotel is in course of demolition.

== Current usage ==
In about 2000 the hotel was converted into the Sun Dancer Resort backpackers' hostel.
