= The Commercial Hotel (Verdigre, Nebraska) =

- Commercial Hotel, The
- U.S. National Register of Historic Places
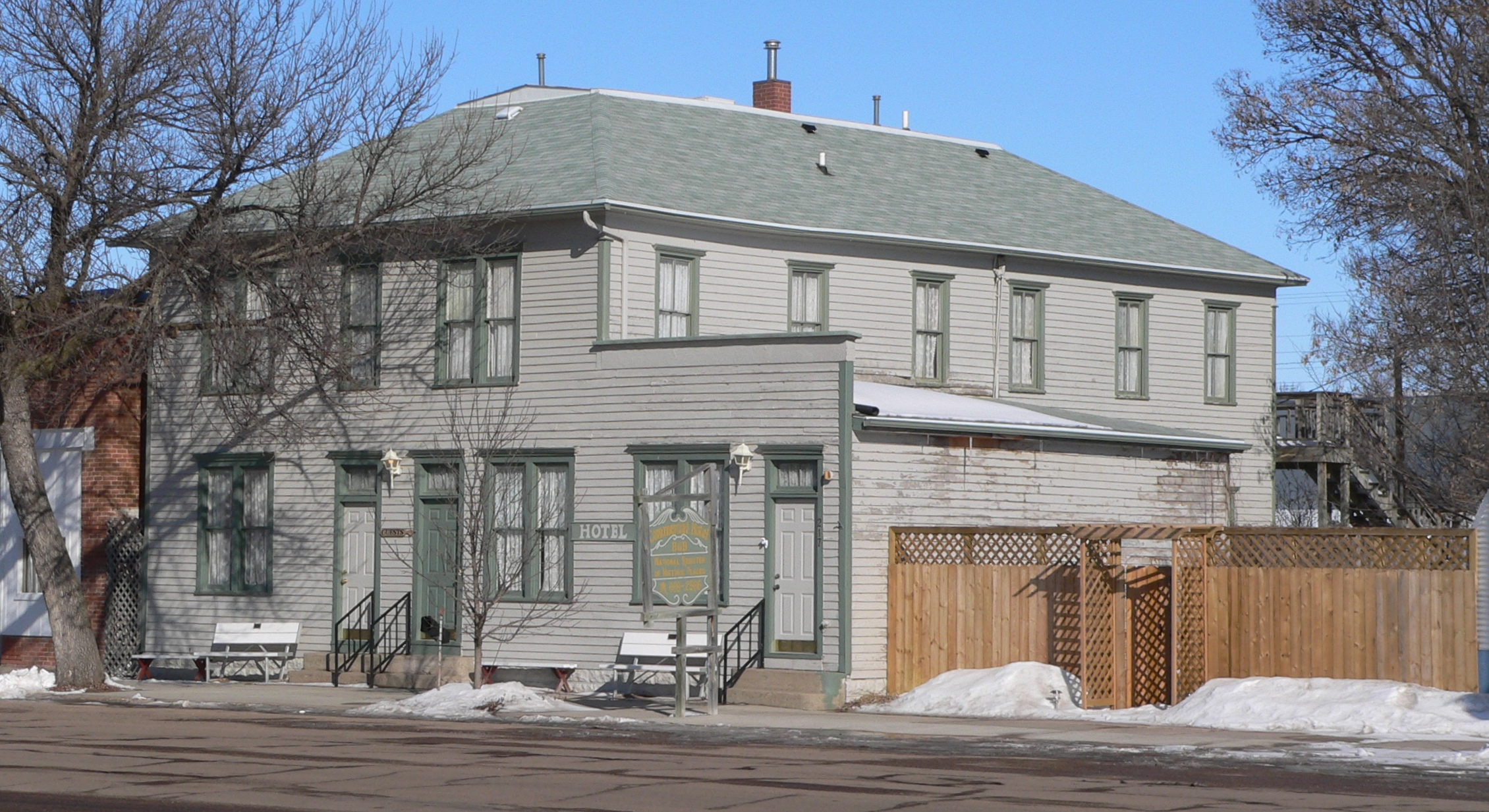

- Location within Nebraska Location within the United States
- Location: 117 Main St., Verdigre, Nebraska
- Coordinates: 42.6°N 98.033333°W
- Area: less than one acre
- Built: 1900
- NRHP reference No.: 90000563
- Added to NRHP: April 5, 1990

The Commercial Hotel in Verdigre, Nebraska, also known as the Verdigre Hotel, is a hotel built in 1900 without indoor plumbing and without gas or electricity, but rather with use of kerosene lamps for lighting. With Verdigre the end of a railroad line and the hub of hog drives, the town needed more hotel space than was supplied by two hotels built previously.

The hotel was listed on the National Register of Historic Places in 1990. It was deemed to be an "excellent representative of first generation hotels, built between 1854 and 1900" in Nebraska.
