= Barellan =

- Town
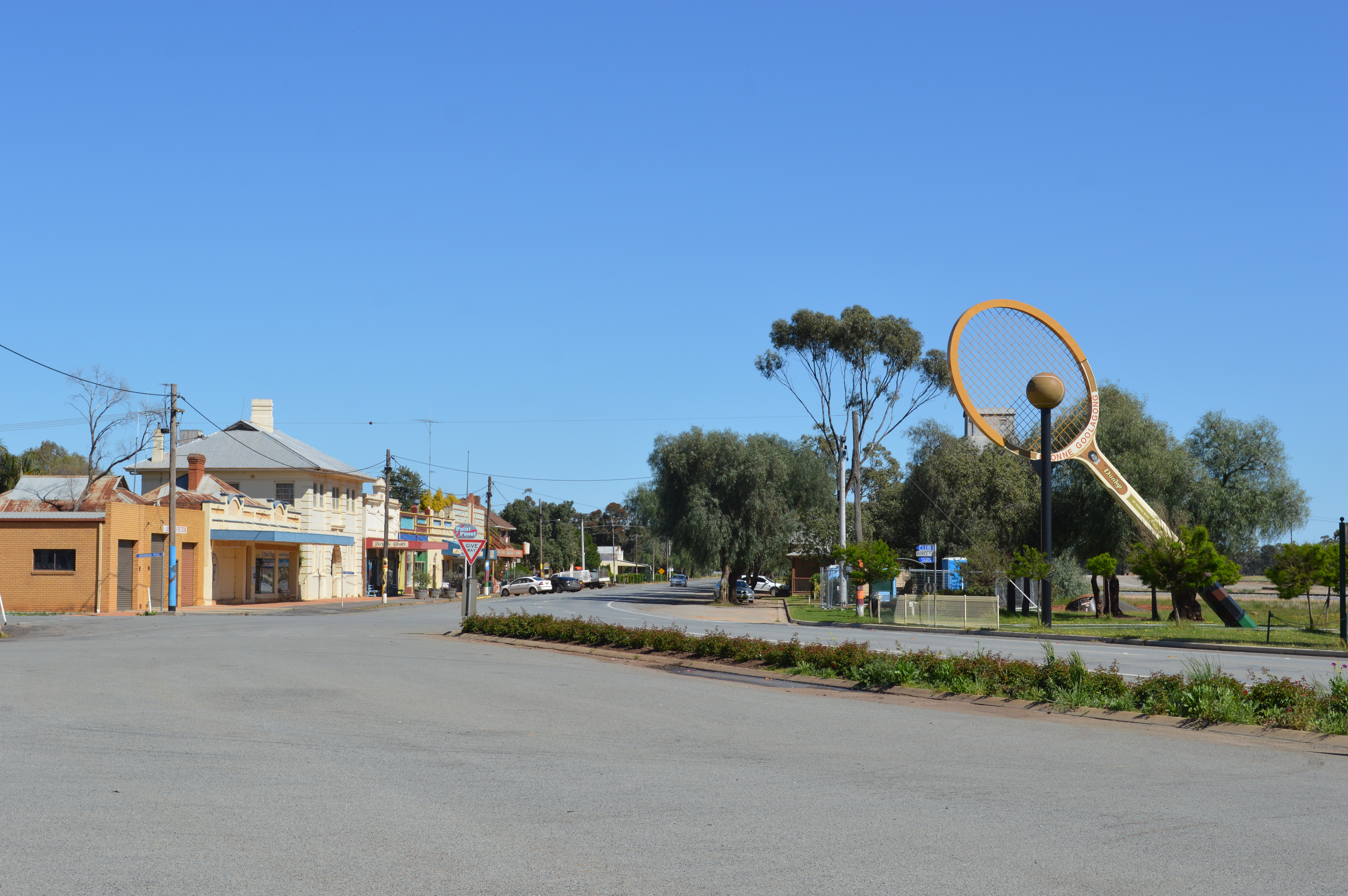
- Barellan, looking along Burley Griffin Way towards Griffith.

- Coordinates: 34°17′0″S 146°34′0″E
- Country: Australia
- State: New South Wales
- LGA: Narrandera Shire
- Location: 521 km (324 mi) from Sydney; 52 km (32 mi) from Griffith; 22 km (14 mi) from Binya; 9 km (5.6 mi) from Moombooldool

Government
  - State electorate: Cootamundra
  - Federal division: Farrer

Population
  - Total: 276 (2021 census)
- Postcode: 2665
- County: Cooper

Barellan /bɑːˈrɛlən/ is a small town in Narrandera Shire in the Riverina region of New South Wales, Australia. On Census night 2021, Barellan had a population of 276. It is a quiet Riverina wheat town on the Burley Griffin Way, with characteristic silos, and functions primarily as a service centre for the surrounding agricultural area.

== History ==
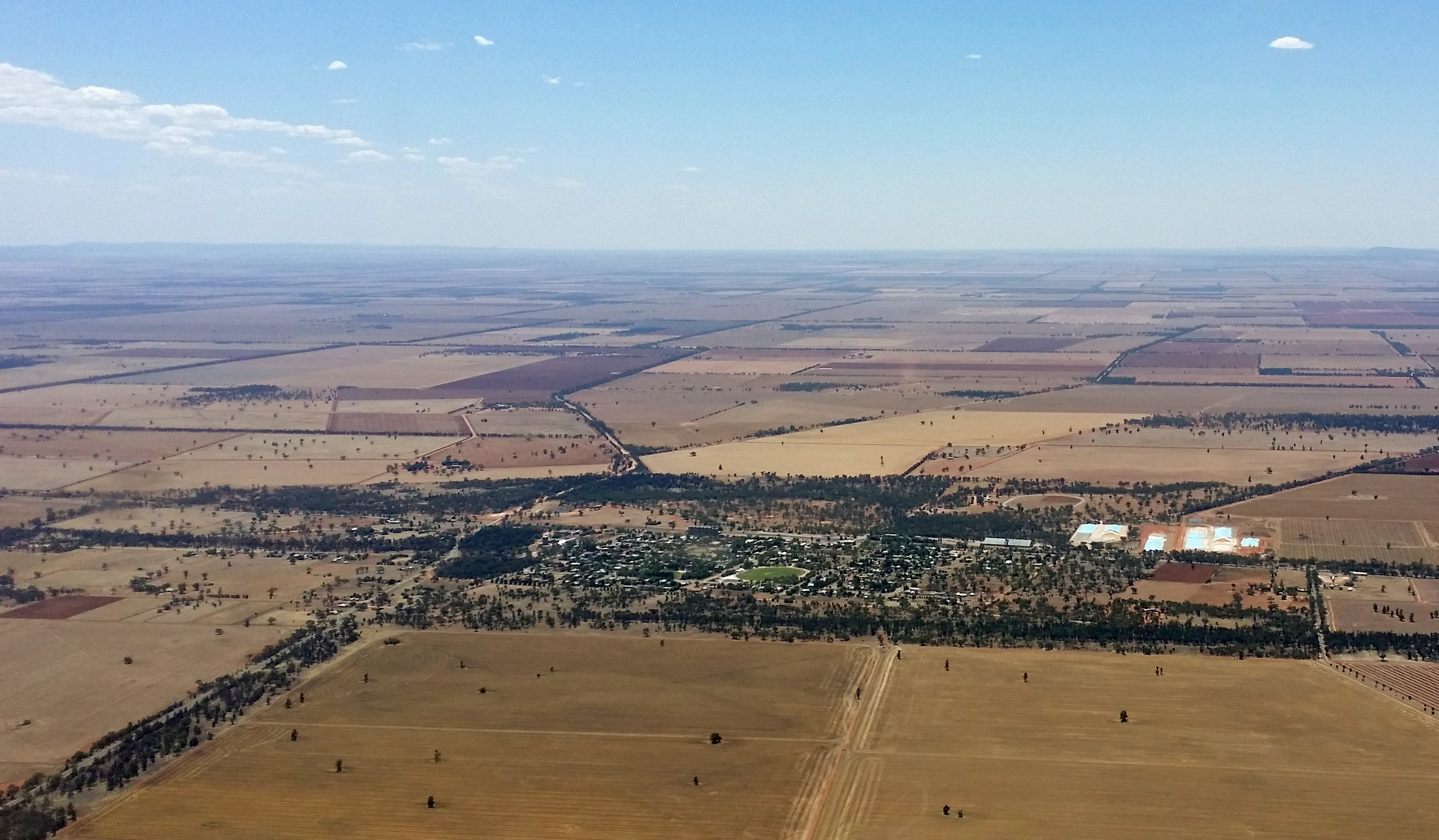
An aerial view of Barellan in February 2014.

The name of Barellan is an Aboriginal expression that literally means the meeting of the waters.

The railway reached Barellan in 1908 and a post office was opened on 1 April 1909.

The Commercial Hotel, "a typically large and rather gracious hotel with an impressive upper verandah", was built in 1924.

Barellan was also the first town to have a Country Women's Association (CWA) rest house (CWA Rest House), built in 1924, the same year as the hotel.

In 2009, Barellan celebrated its centenary.

=== Demography ===
Until recently, the population numbers have remained relatively constant, evidenced as follows:

Selected historical census data for Barellan
Census year		2001	2006	2011	2016
Population	Estimated residents on Census night	359	366	328	334

== Heritage listings ==
Barellan has a number of heritage-listed sites, including:

- Yapunyah Street: CWA Rest House

== Evonne Goolagong ==
Barellan is notable as the childhood home of the tennis player Evonne Goolagong (now Evonne Goolagong Cawley). There is a small plaque honouring her in the main street. Evonne Goolagong was born in nearby Griffith on 31 July 1951 and attended Barellan Primary School. Although Aboriginal people faced widespread discrimination in rural Australia at this time, Evonne was able to play tennis in Barellan from childhood thanks to Bill Kurtzman, a kindly resident, who saw her peering through the fence at the local courts and encouraged her to come in to play. Goolagong left Barellan to attend Willoughby Girls High School in Sydney where she developed her tennis-playing skills.

=== The Big Tennis Racquet ===
A 13.8 metres (45 ft) long replica of a tennis racquet used by Evonne Goolagong has been built in Evonne Goolagong Park. Goolagong unveiled the exact scale model of the wooden Dunlop racquet during Barellan's centenary celebrations on 3 October 2009.

== Barellan Central School ==
Barellan Central School serves students from kindergarten to year 12 and has an enrollment of 53 students. The school employs both primary and secondary teaching staff and participates in the Riverina Access Program (RAP), which facilitates joint sporting activities with other small schools.

== Sport ==
=== Rugby League ===
The Barellan Rams compete in the Group 17 Rugby League competition. They were Clayton Cup winners as the best local team in the state in 1999 and 2002.

=== Australian Rules Football ===
The Barellan "Kangaroos" competed in the Central Riverina Football League from 1973 to 1981, then joined the Riverina Football League in 1982, but were relegated to the Riverina District Football League in 1983, after finishing on the bottom.

In 1984, the Riverina District Football League changed its name back to the Farrer Football League and Barellan competed in this league from 1984 to 1992, when they joined the Northern Riverina Football League in 1993 and had a great run of success with senior football premierships in – 1994, 1995, 1996, 1997, 1998 and 2011.

The Barellan United "Two Blues" re-joined the Farrer Football League in 2015, with a Seniors and Reserves team, alongside their netball teams.

=== Netball ===
The Barellan United Football and Netball Club, or "Two Blues" have 5 netball teams playing in the FFNL; A Grade, A Reserve Grade, B Grade, C Grade and 17s.

=== Tennis ===
Barellan has four all-weather tennis courts located on Mulga Street. This is also the location of the Evonne Goolagong-Cawley Wall, a place where as a young tennis player, Evonne Goolagong-Cawley would spend hours hitting a ball against the wall.

== Gallery ==
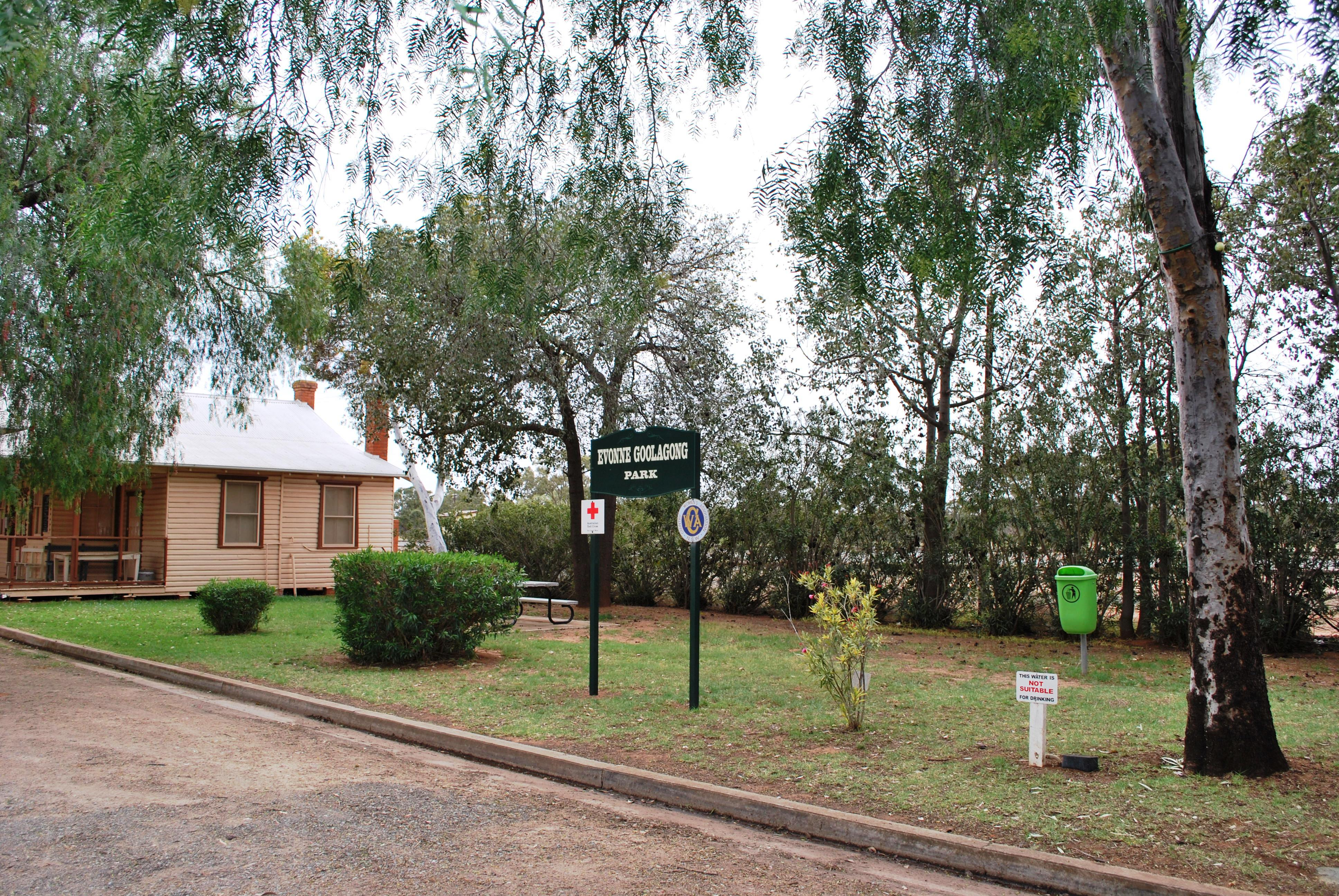
Evonne Goolagong Park, Barellan

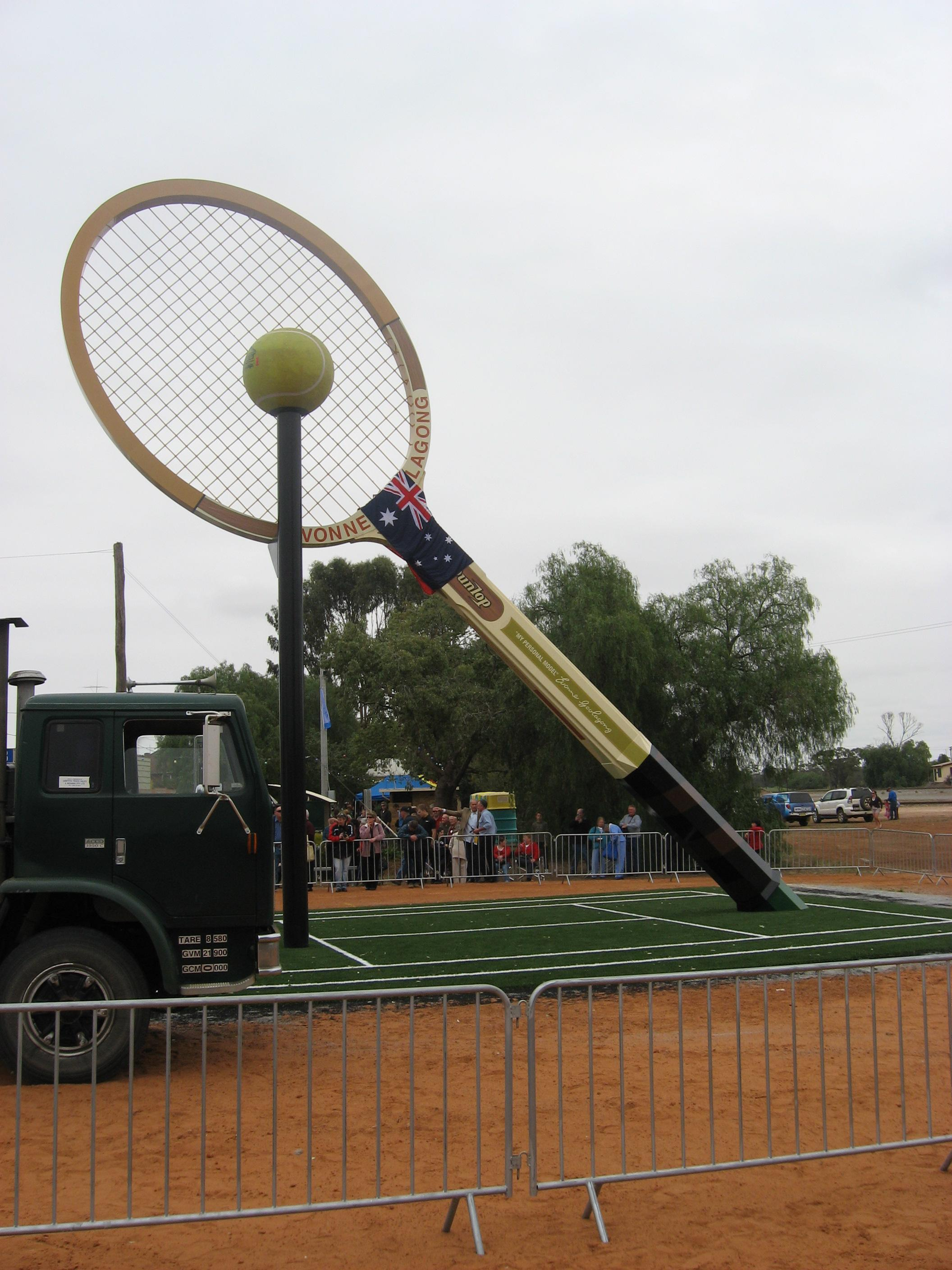
Big Tennis Racket prior to unveiling, 3 October 2009, Barellan

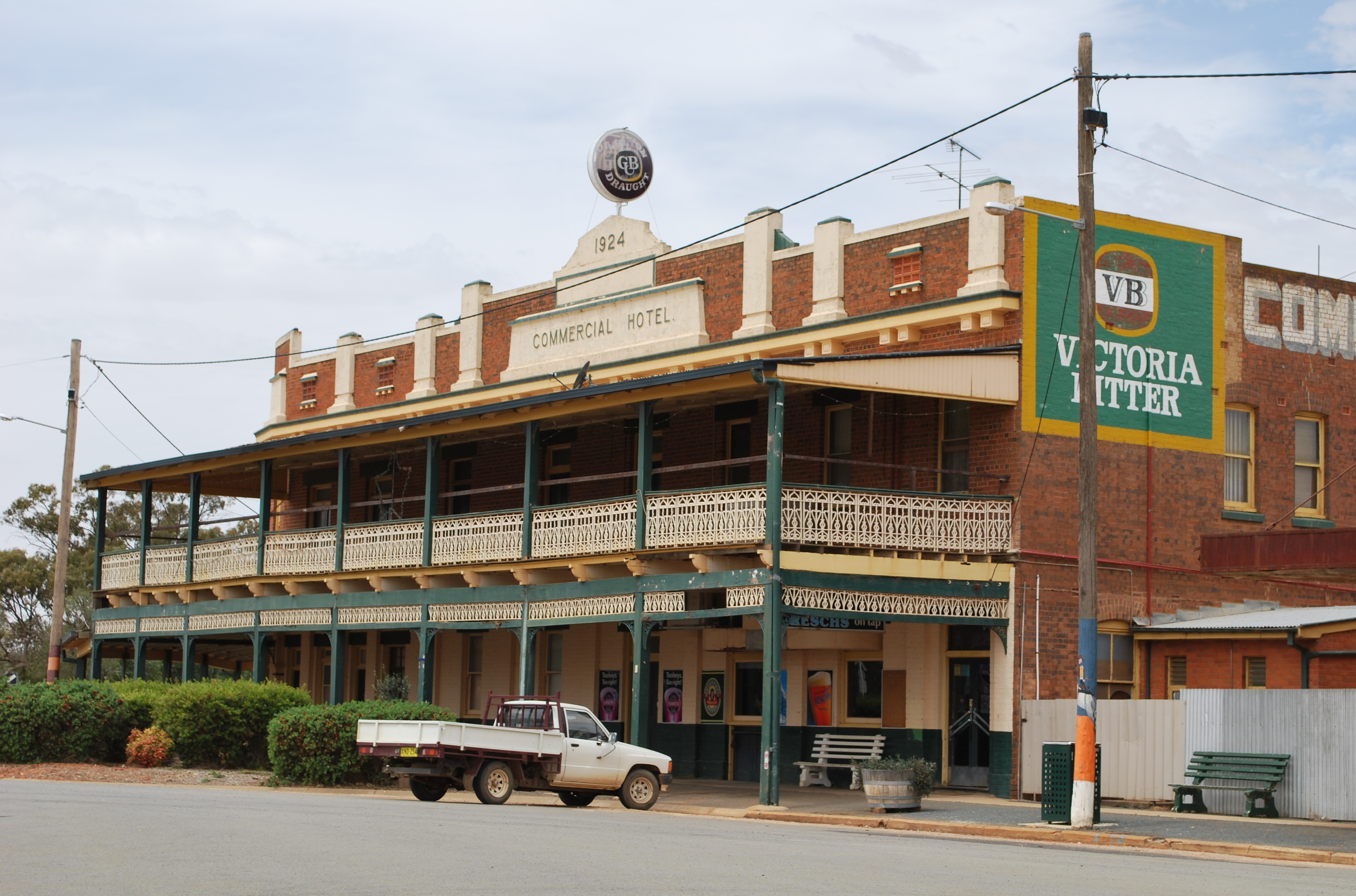
The Commercial Hotel at Barellan
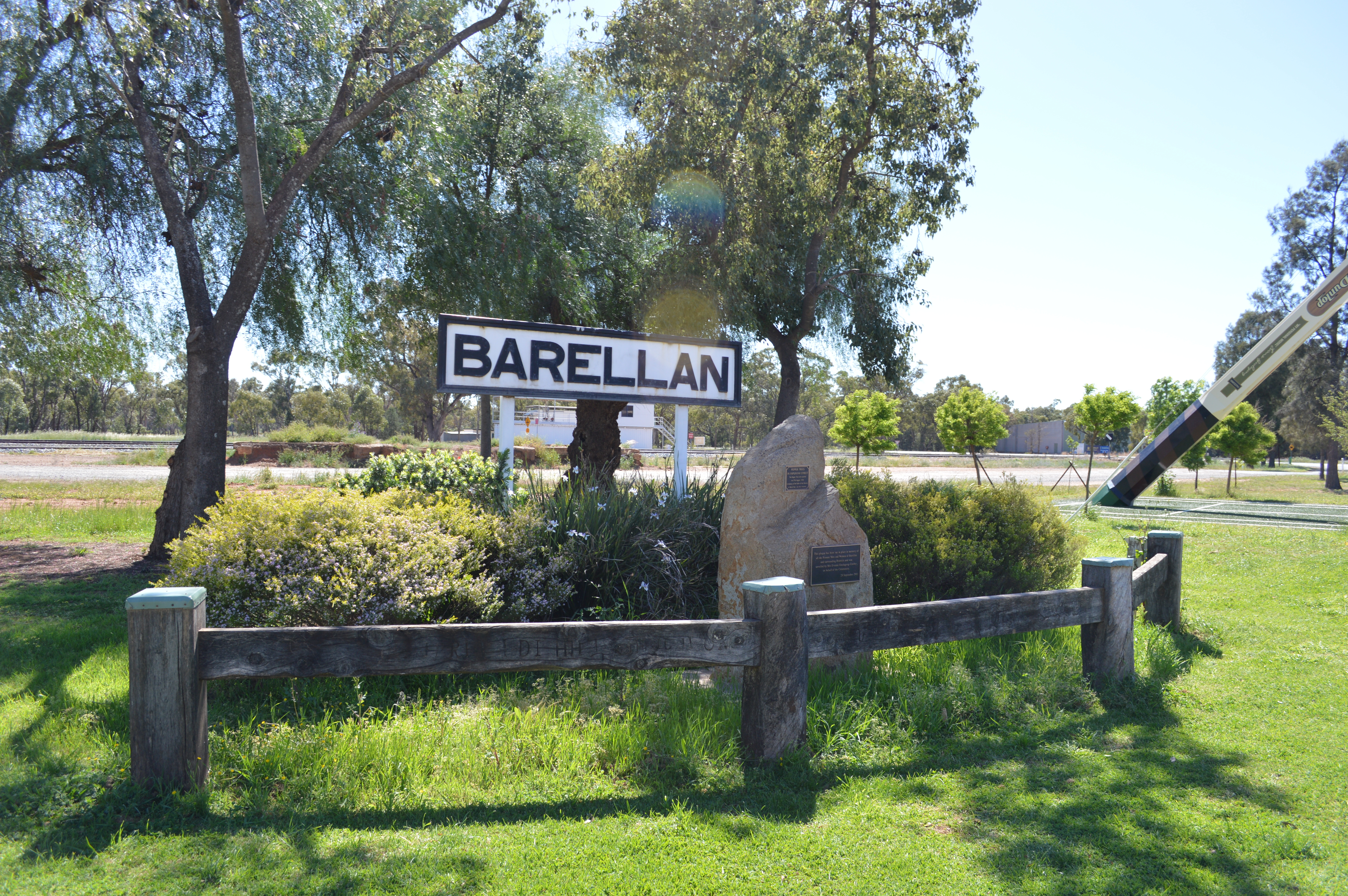

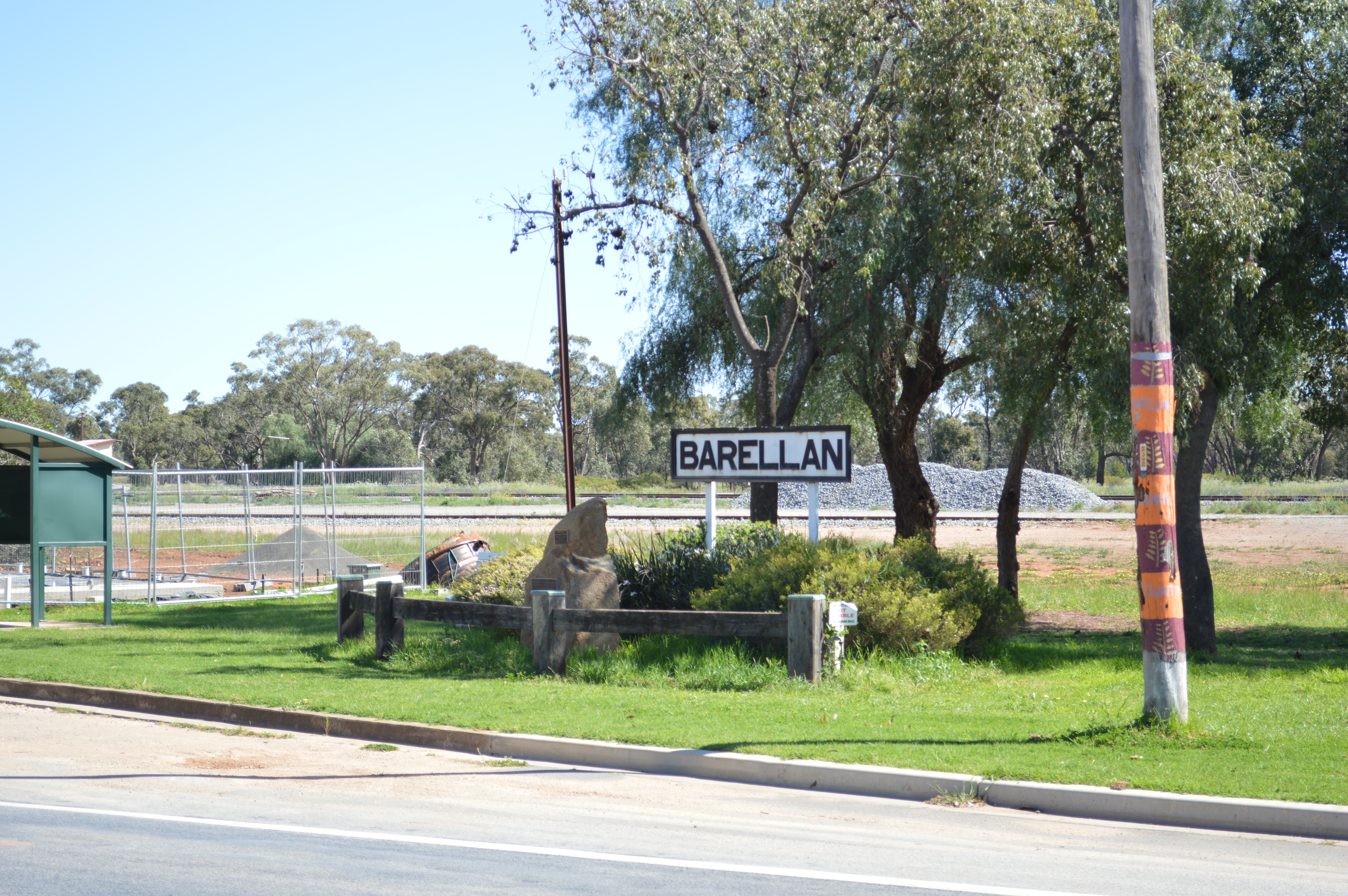

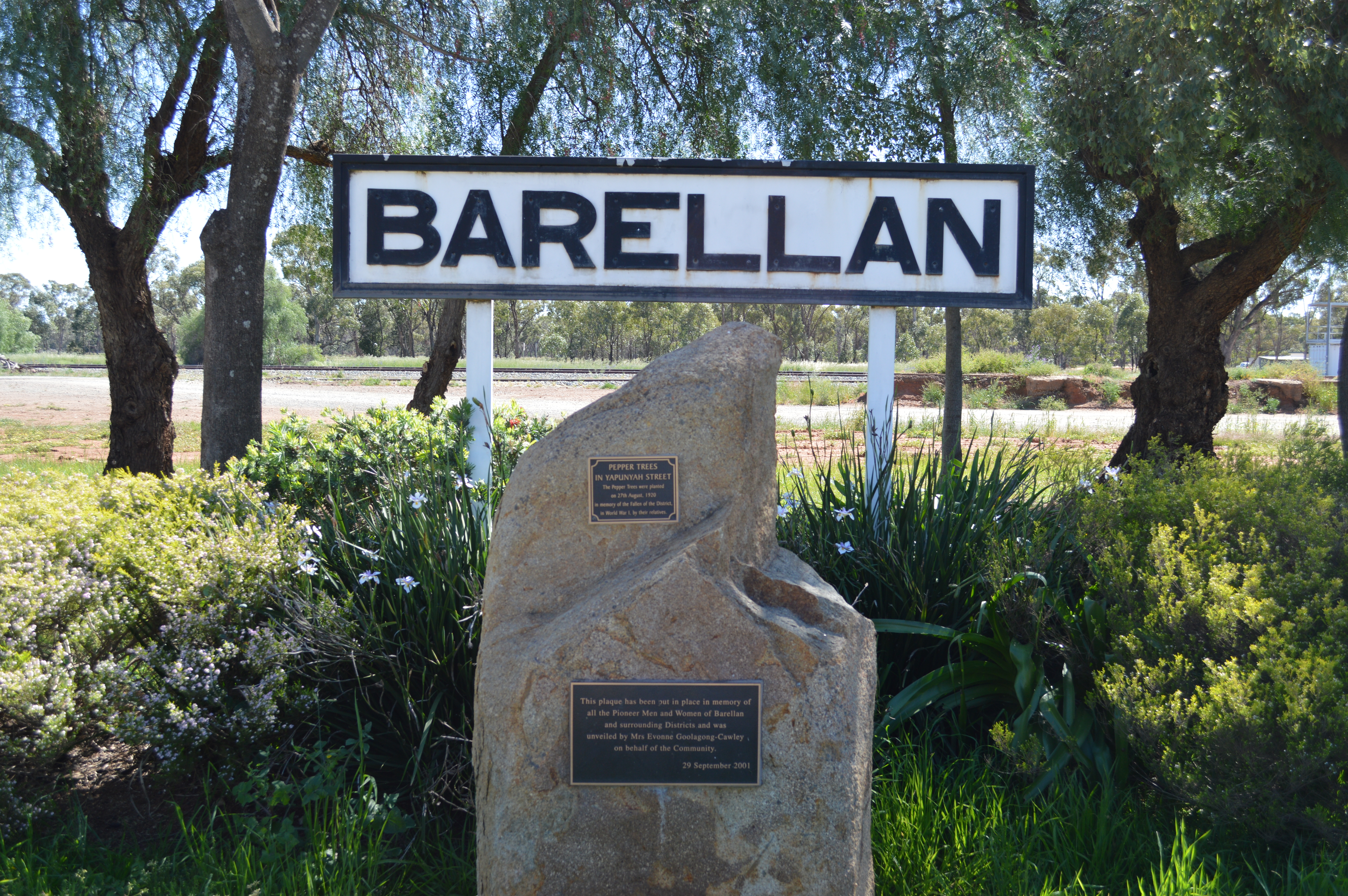

Preceding station	Former services	Following station
Garoolgan towards Roto	Temora–Roto Line	Moombooldool towards Temora
