= Commercial Hotel, Flomaton =

- Commercial Hotel-Hart Hotel
- U.S. National Register of Historic Places
- Alabama Register of Landmarks and Heritage
- Location within Alabama Location within the United States
- Location: 120 Palafox St., Flomaton, Alabama
- Coordinates: 31°0′6″N 87°15′33″W
- Area: less than one acre
- Built: 1905
- Built by: Joseph T. Fleming
- Architect: Unknown
- Architectural style: Queen Anne
- NRHP reference No.: 86001160

Significant dates
- Added to NRHP: May 22, 1986
- Designated ARLH: April 11, 1984

The Commercial Hotel, later known as the Hart Hotel and Flomaton Hotel, was a historic hotel building in Flomaton, Alabama, United States. The two-story wood-frame structure was built from 1904 to 1905 in the Queen Anne style. It had a brick pier foundation. Fish scale shingle patterns decorated the front of each gable end. The front facade featured a full-width porch with neoclassical columns. The hotel contained 18 guest rooms, all with a fireplace. The interior retained its original woodwork throughout. The Flomaton Hotel was significant for its associations with the early growth and development of Flomaton, Alabama. Initially a railroad junction (Pensacola Junction) serving as the intersection of two major lines, Flomaton, AL was one of several small towns that sprang up along the L & N Railroad lines during its rapid expansion beginning in 1879. The Flomaton Hotel was one of five hotels that pre-dated the 1908 incorporation of the town, and survives as the only hotel building of that era in the county.

The Flomaton Hotel was also significant for its associations with commercial growth and development in Flomaton, Alabama. The 1904-05 construction of the hotel (then known as The Commercial Hotel) was a venture to relocate business near the depot in hope of directly tapping the railway passenger traffic and crews. One of the first and most successful hotels in the town, the Flomaton Hotel depended on the railway passenger traffic until the 1930s. In the early and mid-teens the hotel was noted as a favorite hideaway for honeymooners and quiet family vacations. In the 1920s under new management and a new name (The Hart Hotel), the hotel gained a good reputation for its fine "tablespreads," attracting the Pensacola affluent to Flomaton for Sunday dinner and a fifty-mile train outing. The 1930s depression and the advent of the automobile retarded the passenger train patronage, as well as the business of the hotel; however, during WII, the hotel was greatly patronized by servicemen awaiting train connections to overseas ports. Once again under new management, and gaining yet another name (The Flomaton Hotel), the hotel's character and patronage changed to that typical of "residential hotels," accommodating primarily the employees of the local oil companies. The owner planned to restore the hotel as a Guest House, targeting the patronage of antique buffs attracted to the local auctions.

The hotel was destroyed by fire in late 1986. It has been replaced by a local church.
