= Wadena station =

Wadena Depot
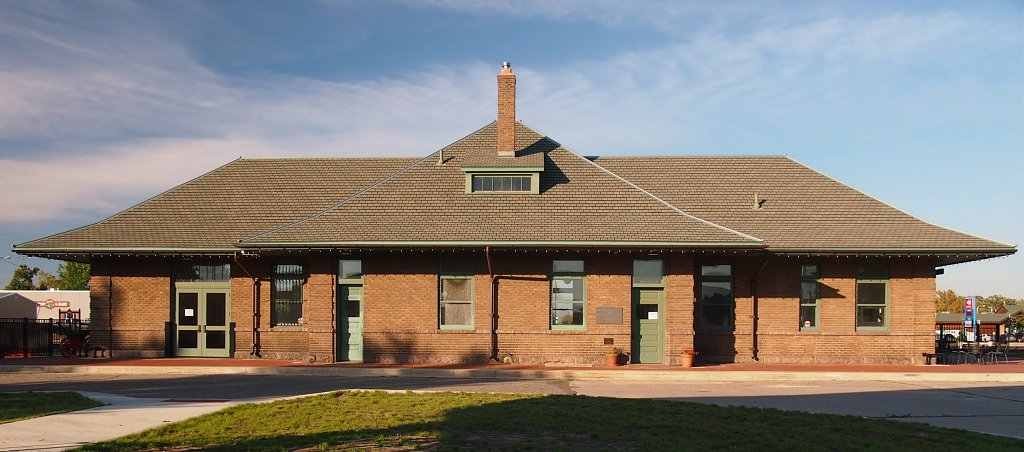
- The Northern Pacific Passenger Depot from the southwest

General information
- Location: 100 Aldrich Avenue Southwest, Wadena, Minnesota
- Coordinates: 46°26′31.5″N 95°8′17″W

History
- Opened: 1915
- Closed: 1971
- Northern Pacific Passenger Depot
- U.S. National Register of Historic Places
- Area: Less than one acre
- Built: 1915
- Built by: Nelson & Nelson
- Architect: Northern Pacific Railway
- NRHP reference No.: 88003012
- Designated: January 3, 1989
Location
- Location within Minnesota

The Wadena Depot is a historic former railway station in Wadena, Minnesota, United States, operated by the Northern Pacific Railway from 1915 to 1971. The station was listed on the National Register of Historic Places in 1989 under the name Northern Pacific Passenger Depot for its local significance in the theme of transportation. It was nominated for representing the impact of the Northern Pacific Railway on the establishment and development of Wadena.

Passenger service ceased in 1971, though the adjacent rail line remains in active use by the BNSF Railway. The building was restored in 2008 and now serves as a visitor center, railroad museum, and event venue.

== See also ==
- National Register of Historic Places listings in Wadena County, Minnesota

Preceding station	Northern Pacific Railway	Following station
Bluffton toward Seattle or Tacoma	Main Line	Verndale toward St. Paul
Deer Creek toward Oakes	Fergus Falls Branch	Terminus
