= Commercial Hotel (Prairie du Chien, Wisconsin) =

- U.S. National Register of Historic Places
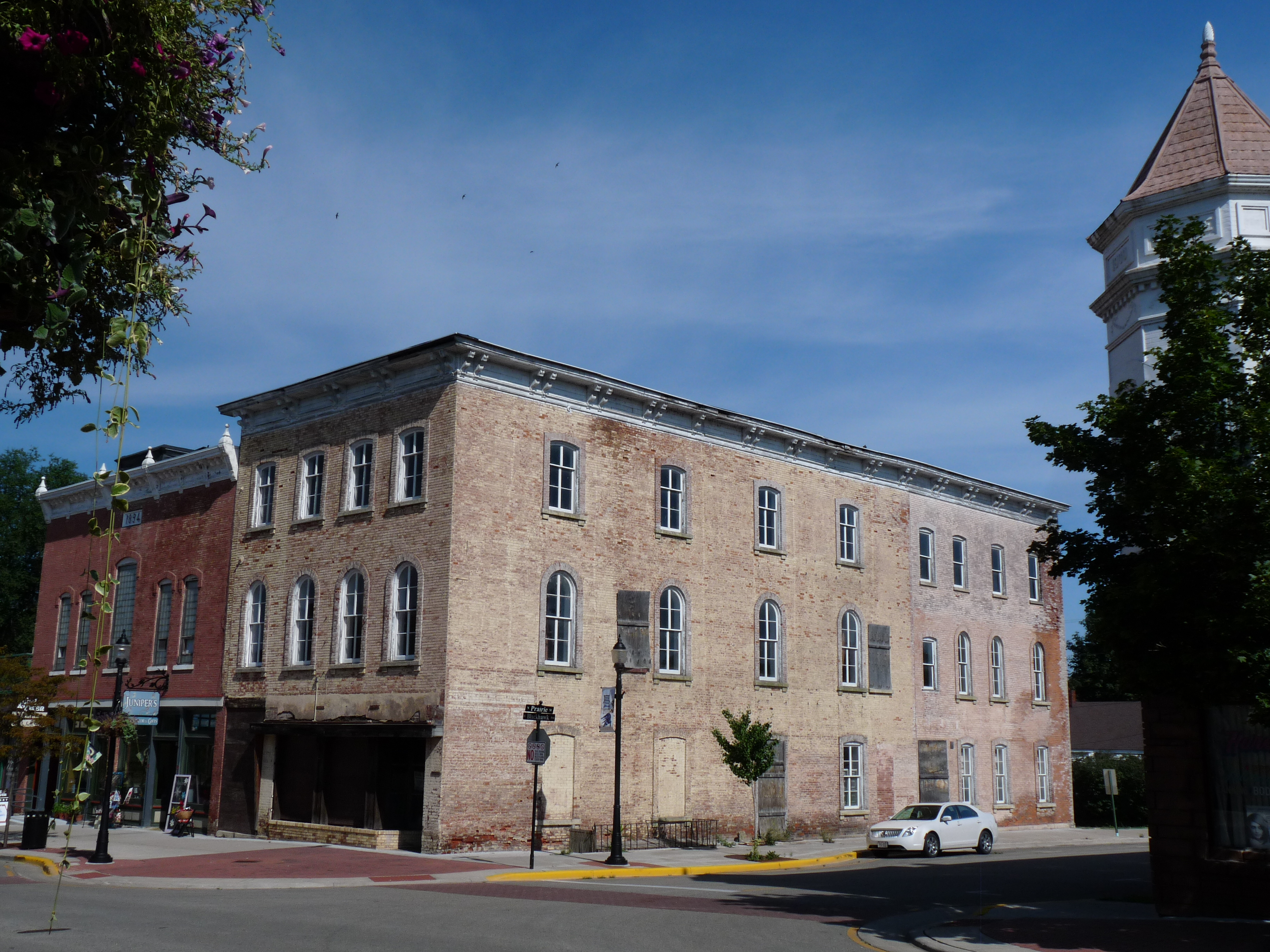
- Commercial Hotel
- Location: 201 W. Blackhawk Ave., Prairie du Chien, Wisconsin
- Coordinates: 43°03′06″N 91°08′52″W
- Area: less than one acre
- Architectural style: Italianate
- NRHP reference No.: 02001342
- Added to NRHP: November 15, 2002

The Commercial Hotel is located in Prairie du Chien, Wisconsin.

== History ==
Originally known as the Schweizer Block, this Italianate-styled building first housed retail, offices and storage. It later became the Commodore Hotel, the Commercial Hotel, and the Fort Crawford Hotel. The building was added to the State and the National Register of Historic Places in 2002.
