= Commercial Hotel (Fort Smith, Arkansas) =

- U.S. National Register of Historic Places
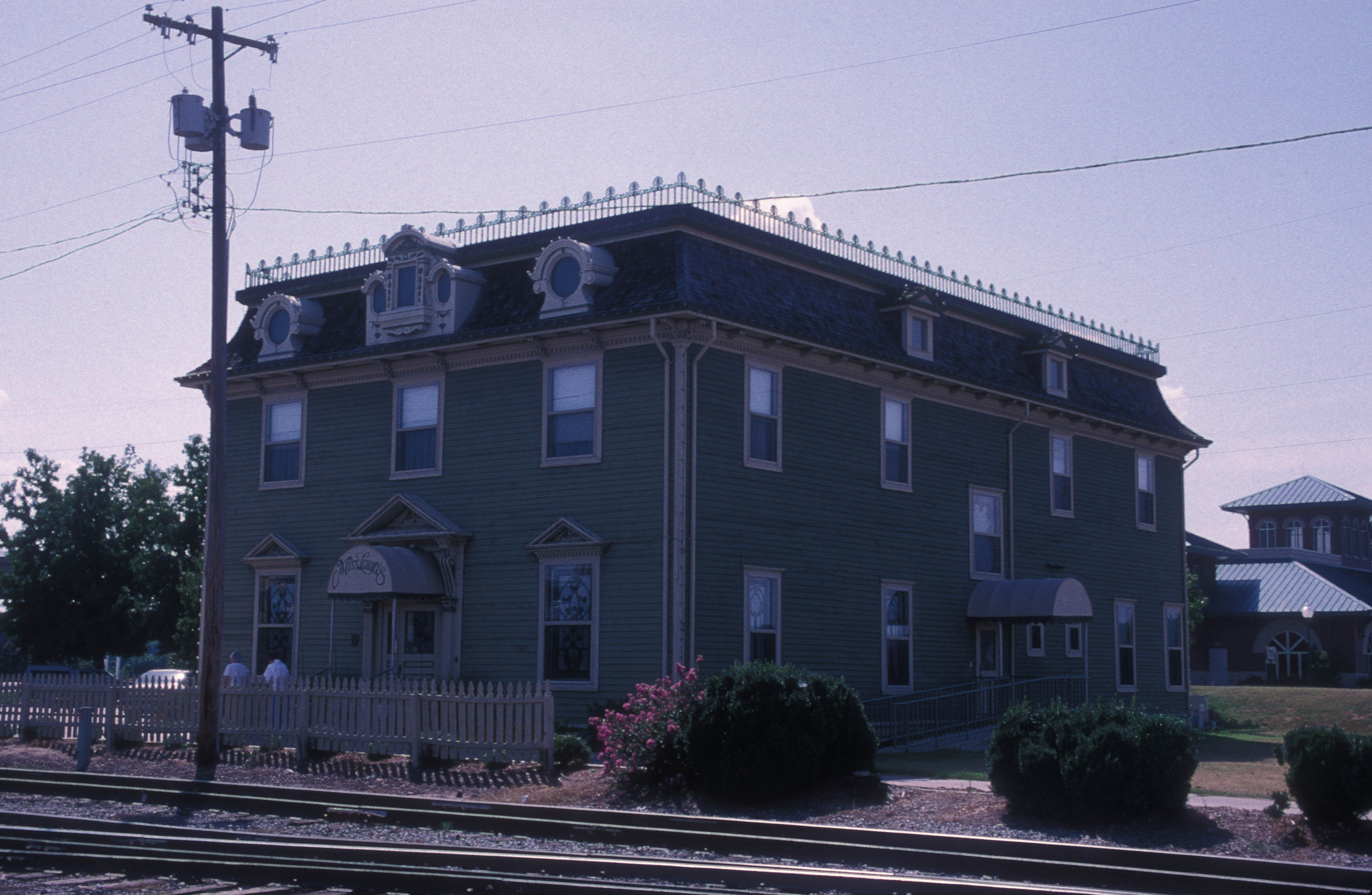

- Location within Arkansas Location within the United States
- Location: 123 N. 1st St., Fort Smith, Arkansas
- Coordinates: 35°23′24″N 94°25′44″W
- Built: 1898
- Architectural style: Victorian Baroque
- NRHP reference No.: 73000391
- Added to NRHP: May 7, 1973

The Commercial Hotel, also known as the River Front Hotel, is a historic former hotel building at 123 North 1st Street in Fort Smith, Arkansas. The three-story hotel is constructed of wood with a mansard roof, third-floor dormers, and wrought iron cresting, which are all characteristic of the Second Empire style. The hotel was built in 1898–99, when Fort Smith was a frontier town at the edge of Indian Territory (now Oklahoma). Following Oklahoma statehood in 1907, the hotel declined in significance and eventually closed. The building now hosts "Miss Laura's Social Club", and serves as Fort Smith's visitors center.

The building was listed on the National Register of Historic Places in 1973.
