= Ernest P. Anderson =

American politician (1897–1955)

Ernest P. Anderson (March 2, 1897 – April 30, 1955) was an American businessman and politician.

Anderson was born in Summit, Roberts County, South Dakota. In 1903, he moved to a farm with his family near Clarissa, Todd County, Minnesota and went to the Minnesota public schools. Anderson served in the United States Marine Corps during World War I. He lived in Wadena, Minnesota with his wife and family and was involved with the Wadena Silo Company. Anderson served in the Minnesota Senate from 1945 to 1954.
