= Hotel Wapello =

- Commercial Hotel
- U.S. National Register of Historic Places
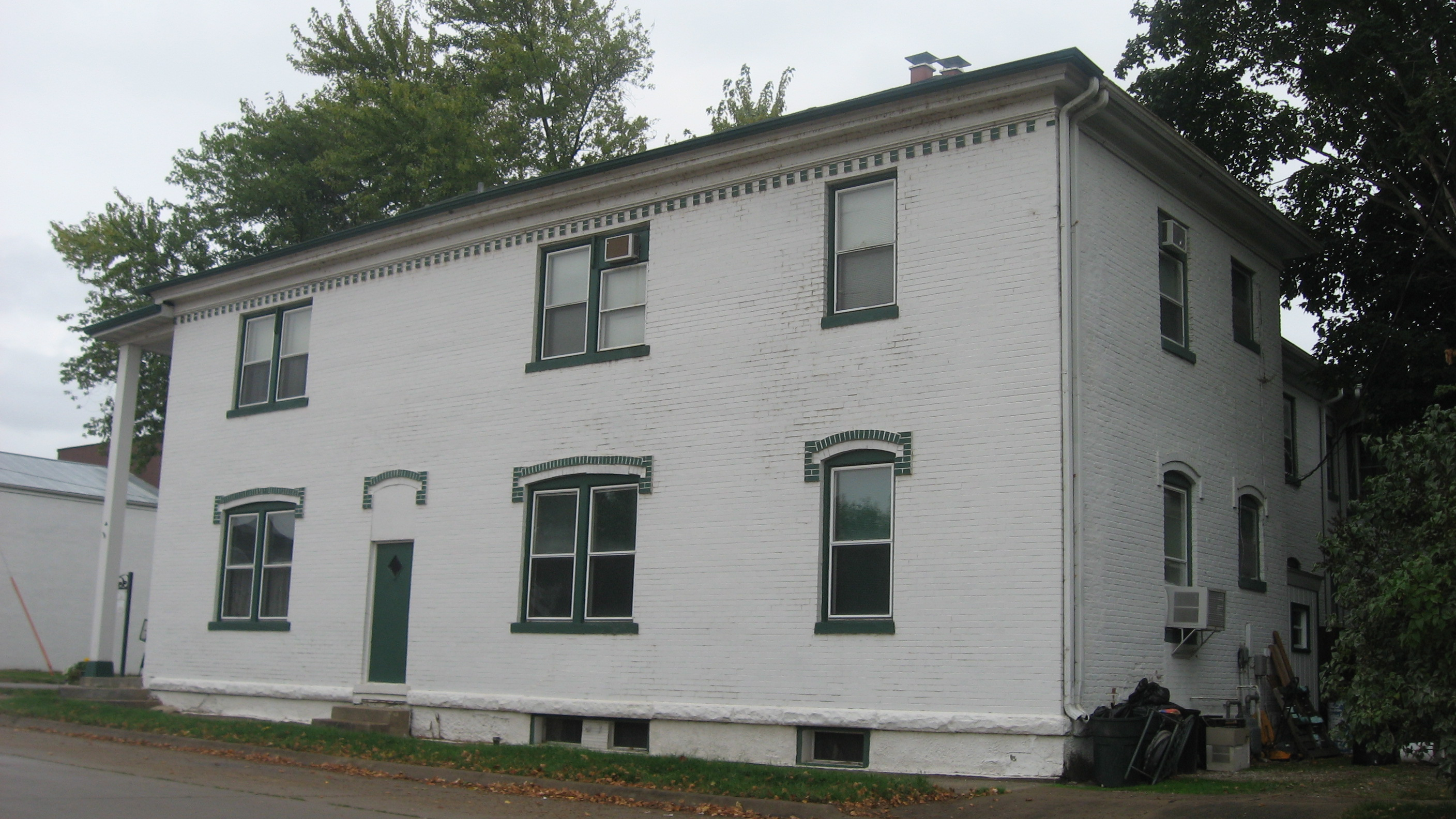

- Location within Iowa Location within the United States
- Location: 227 N. Main St. Wapello, Iowa
- Coordinates: 41°10′52″N 91°11′13″W
- Area: less than one acre
- Built: 1853, 1906
- Built by: H.O. Pease
- Architectural style: Late 19th and 20th Century Revivals; Late Victorian
- NRHP reference No.: 01000912
- Added to NRHP: August 30, 2001

The Hotel Wapello is a historic building located in Wapello, Iowa, United States. It was listed on the National Register of Historic Places in 2001 as Commercial Hotel.

The hotel opened in 1906 as the Commercial Hotel. It is actually a combination of two buildings. The older section is at the end of the building in the middle of the block. It was built as a school in 1853 and served that purpose until 1879. In 1887 the second floor became the law office of F. W. Tatlock, and he rented out the first floor. Gus Tiemeyer bought the building in 1901 and operated a livery stable, which was located on the corner where the newer section of the building stands. Wapello had one good hotel and the Traveling Man's Hotel served that purpose until it was destroyed in a fire in 1905. Wapello architect and contractor H. O. Pease designed the hotel wing. It, like the older school building, is two stories tall. The two buildings are joined with a door into the hallway of the hotel wing. The hotel wing is an L-shaped frame structure covered with a brick veneer and capped with a hip roof. It originally had a wraparound porch on the first floor. It was replaced with the present two-story porch, possibly in the late 1930s. The inside originally housed 21 sleeping rooms, a lobby, office, dining room, kitchen, pantry, storeroom, laundry, and sample room. It was subsequently converted into 12 sleeping rooms, each with their own bathroom. The former dining room and kitchen area were converted into an apartment.
