= Commercial Hotel, Albury =

Commercial Hotel
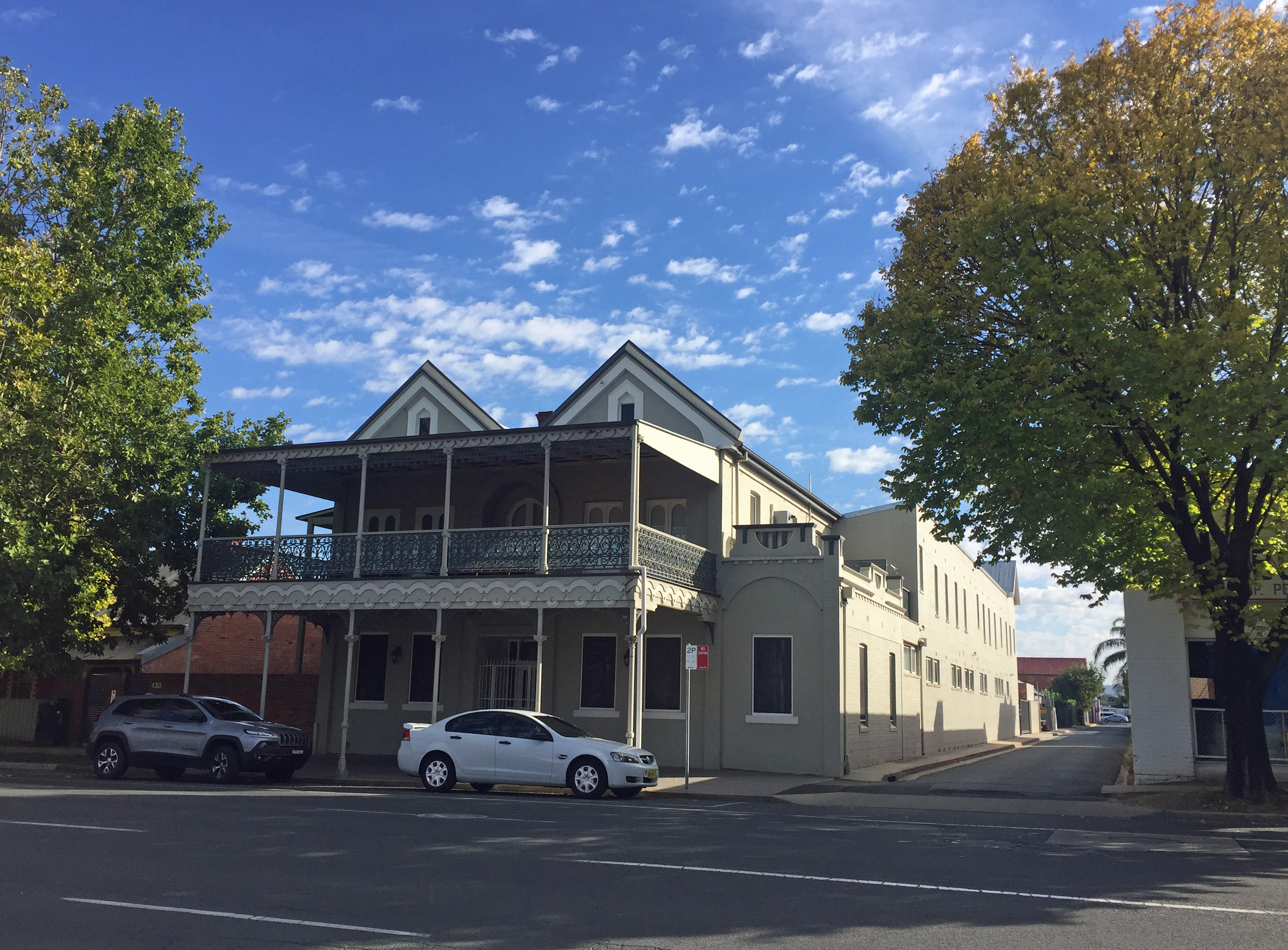
- The Commercial Hotel in 2019

- Location within New South Wales Location within Australia
- 36.0832°S 146.9223°E
- Location: 430–436 Smollett Street, Albury, New South Wales, Australia

Site notes
- Architects: Gordon & Gordon (1880s); Louis Harrison (1920s)
- Owner: Cohalan & Mitchell Roofing Pty Ltd; Lavington Plaster Linings Pty Ltd; Layisa Pty Ltd; Waterstreet Property Pty Ltd

New South Wales Heritage Register
- Official name: Commercial Hotel & Cottage; Waterstreet Hotel
- Type: state heritage (built)
- Designated: 2 April 1999
- Reference no.: 538
- Type: Hotel
- Category: Commercial

Commercial Hotel is a heritage-listed former hotel at 430–436 Smollett Street, Albury, New South Wales, Australia. It was formerly known as Waterstreet Hotel. The property is owned by Cohalan & Mitchell Roofing Pty Ltd, Lavington Plaster Linings Pty Ltd, Layisa Pty Ltd and Waterstreet Property Pty Ltd. It was added to the New South Wales State Heritage Register on 2 April 1999.

== History ==
The hotel is believed to have been constructed in c. 1854, forming the oldest surviving public hotel in Albury. Another source says it was built even earlier, in 1844, by James Wyse.

Modifications were made to the hotel in c. 1880s when a two-storey front verandah was constructed with timber floors and cast iron fretwork. In c. 1912 an architect-designed two-storey rear accommodation wing was constructed. In c. 1950s the ground floor windows were replaced with P&O style fenestration and concrete awning.

The hotel was owned by Mrs Waterstreet in 1914, giving its eponymous title. In 1929 it was reported that the Waterhouse family leased the hotel.

During 2003 and 2005, unsympathetic prior alterations to the building interiors were removed, such as suspended ceilings, exposing original ceiling heights and plaster detailing.

The hotel was later sold and converted into apartments.

== Heritage listing ==
The Commercial Hotel was listed on the New South Wales State Heritage Register on 2 April 1999.

The hotel, dating from the 1850s with an 1880s verandah and 1912 architect-designed accommodation wing, is believed to be the oldest public hotel in Albury. It was described as an early commercial response to the railway and as a good example of a late colonial style country hotel.
