= Results of the 1928 New South Wales local elections =

← 1925	1 December 1928	1931 →

This is a list of local government area results for the 1928 New South Wales local elections.

== Bland ==
1928 Bland Shire Council election
← 1925	1 December 1928	1931 →

All seats on Bland Shire Council

Councillor Ryenford was elected Shire President.

== Bowral ==
1928 Bowral Municipal Council election
← 1925	1 December 1928	1931 →

All seats on Bowral Municipal Council

Alfred Stephens was re-elected as mayor.

== Dorrigo ==
1928 Dorrigo Shire Council election
← 1925	1 December 1928	1931 →

All 6 seats on Dorrigo Shire Council 4 seats needed for a majority

=== Dorrigo Results ===
==== Riding A ====
1928 New South Wales local elections: Riding A
Party	Candidate	Votes	%	±%
	Albert Johnson (re-elected)	80	66.7	
	W. J. Allison	40	33.3	
Total formal votes		120		
Informal votes				
Turnout				

==== Riding B ====
1928 New South Wales local elections: Riding B
Party	Candidate	Votes	%	±%
	W. S. Scott (elected unopposed)			
Total formal votes				
Informal votes				
Turnout				

==== Riding C ====
1928 New South Wales local elections: Riding C
Party	Candidate	Votes	%	±%
	J. J. Boultwood (re-elected)	139	74.3	
	G. Everingham	48	25.7	
Total formal votes		187		
Informal votes				
Turnout				

==== Riding D ====
1928 New South Wales local elections: Riding D
Party	Candidate	Votes	%	±%
	Thos. Mulhearn (elected unopposed)			
Total formal votes				
Informal votes				
Turnout				

==== Riding E ====
1928 New South Wales local elections: Riding E
Party	Candidate	Votes	%	±%
	H. T. Short (elected unopposed)			
Total formal votes				
Informal votes				
Turnout				

==== Riding F ====
1928 New South Wales local elections: Riding F
Party	Candidate	Votes	%	±%
	J. A. Kirkland (elected)	77	53.8	
	F. Long	66	46.2	
Total formal votes		143	100	
Informal votes		0	0	
Turnout		143		

== Eastwood ==
1928 Eastwood Municipal Council election
← 1925	1 December 1928	1931 →

All 9 seats on Eastwood Municipal Council 5 seats needed for a majority

=== Eastwood Results ===
==== Central ====
1928 New South Wales local elections: Central Ward
Party	Candidate	Votes	%	±%
	Reginald Duthill Havelock Ball (elected unopposed)			
	Peter Stewart McBeath (elected unopposed)			
	Francis Myers (elected unopposed)			
Total formal votes				
Informal votes				
Turnout				

==== East ====
1928 New South Wales local elections: East Ward
Party	Candidate	Votes	%	±%
	Gabriel Dunlop (elected)	unopposed		
	John Churchman Matthews (elected)	unopposed		
	Reginald John Small (elected)	unopposed		
Registered electors				

==== West ====
1928 New South Wales local elections: West Ward
Party	Candidate	Votes	%	±%
	William Poole (elected)			
	Sydney George Small (elected)			
	Ernest Percy Woodford (elected)			
Total formal votes				
Informal votes				
Turnout				

== Gilgandra ==
1928 Gilgandra Shire Council election
← 1925	December 1928	1931 →

All seats on Gilgandra Shire Council

Councillor E. Townsend was elected Shire President.

== Maclean ==
1928 Maclean Shire Council election
← 1925	December 1928	1931 →

All seats on Maclean Shire Council

Oswill Kelly was elected mayor.

== Narromine ==
1928 Narromine Municipal Council election
← 1925	December 1928	1931 →

All seats on Narromine Municipal Council

A. R. Dundas was re-elected as mayor.

== Petersham ==
1928 Petersham Municipal Council election
← 1925	December 1928	1931 →

All seats on Petersham Municipal Council

T. Casserly was elected mayor.

== Rockdale ==
1928 Rockdale City Council election
← 1925	December 1928	1931 →

All seats on Rockdale City Council

E. G. Barton was elected mayor, defeating J. Hayes and E. Gardiner.

Hopetoun Ward alderman Frank Skinner was unable to ascend his seat after the elections, causing a vacancy which was to be filled through an extraordinary election held on either 23 December 1928 or 30 December 1928.

Other aldermen included Fortescue, Levey, and Baxter.

=== Rockdale Results ===
==== Arnclifff ====
1928 New South Wales local elections: Arnclifff Ward
Party	Candidate	Votes	%	±%
	J. Hayes (elected)			
Total formal votes				
Informal votes				
Turnout				

==== Hopetoun ====
1928 New South Wales local elections: Hopetoun Ward
Party	Candidate	Votes	%	±%
	E. Gardiner (elected)			
	Frank Skinner (elected)			
Total formal votes				
Informal votes				
Turnout				

==== Scarborough ====
1928 New South Wales local elections: Scarborough Ward
Party	Candidate	Votes	%	±%
	E. Barton (elected)			
Total formal votes				
Informal votes				
Turnout				

== Willimbong ==
1928 Willimbong Shire Council election
December 1928	1931 →

All 8 seats on Willimbong Shire Council 5 seats needed for a majority
- Turnout: (%)
	First party	Second party
	IND	IND
Party	Independents	Ind. Labor
Seats won	7	1
Seat change	▲7	▲1
Popular vote	1,484	150
Percentage	90.8%	9.2%
Largest party before election
Independents
Subsequent largest party
Independents

This was the first election for Willimbong Shire Council, which was incorporated in January 1928. Following the election, Major John Dooley was elected Shire President by the inaugural council.

=== Willimbong Results ===
Riding	Elected councillor	Party
A	A. T. McKay	Independent
A	W. J. Adams	Independent
B	R. Struck	Independent
B	Ambrose George Enticknap	Independent Labor
C	A. Jamieson	Independent
C	John S. Dooley	Independent
D	F. J. Blackmore	Independent
D	J. McCleary	Independent

1928 New South Wales local elections: Willimbong Shire
Party	Votes	%	Swing	Seats	Change
Independents	1,484	90.8	new	8	▲8
Independent Labor	150	9.2	new	1	▲1
Total formal votes	1,634				
Total formal ballots					
Informal votes					
Turnout					
Registered voters					

==== Riding A ====
1928 New South Wales local elections: Riding A
Party	Candidate	Votes	%	±%
Independent	A. T. McKay (elected)	157	31.7	
Independent	W. J. Adams (elected)	137	27.6	
Independent	W. C. Barker	127	25.6	
Independent	P. M. Lynch	75	15.1	
Total formal votes		496		
Informal votes				
Turnout				

==== Riding B ====
1928 New South Wales local elections: Riding B
Party	Candidate	Votes	%	±%
Independent	R. Struck (elected)	191	41.1	
Independent Labor	George Enticknap (elected)	150	32.3	
Independent	T. E. Wright	74	15.9	
Independent	P. E. Errey	50	10.8	
Total formal votes		465		
Informal votes				
Turnout				

==== Riding C ====
1928 New South Wales local elections: Riding C
Party	Candidate	Votes	%	±%
Independent	A. Jamieson (elected)	198	40.4	
Independent	John Sylvester Dooley (elected)	128	26.1	
Independent	W. Newman	113	23.1	
Independent	A. Marston	51	10.4	
Total formal votes		490		
Informal votes				
Turnout				

==== Riding D ====
1928 New South Wales local elections: Riding D
Party	Candidate	Votes	%	±%
Independent	F. J. Blackmore (elected)	58	31.7	
Independent	J. McCleary (elected)	45	24.6	
Independent	A. McDowell	44	24.0	
Independent	T. Darchy	36	19.7	
Total formal votes		183		
Informal votes				
Turnout				
