= Petersham Town Hall =

Town hall in Australia

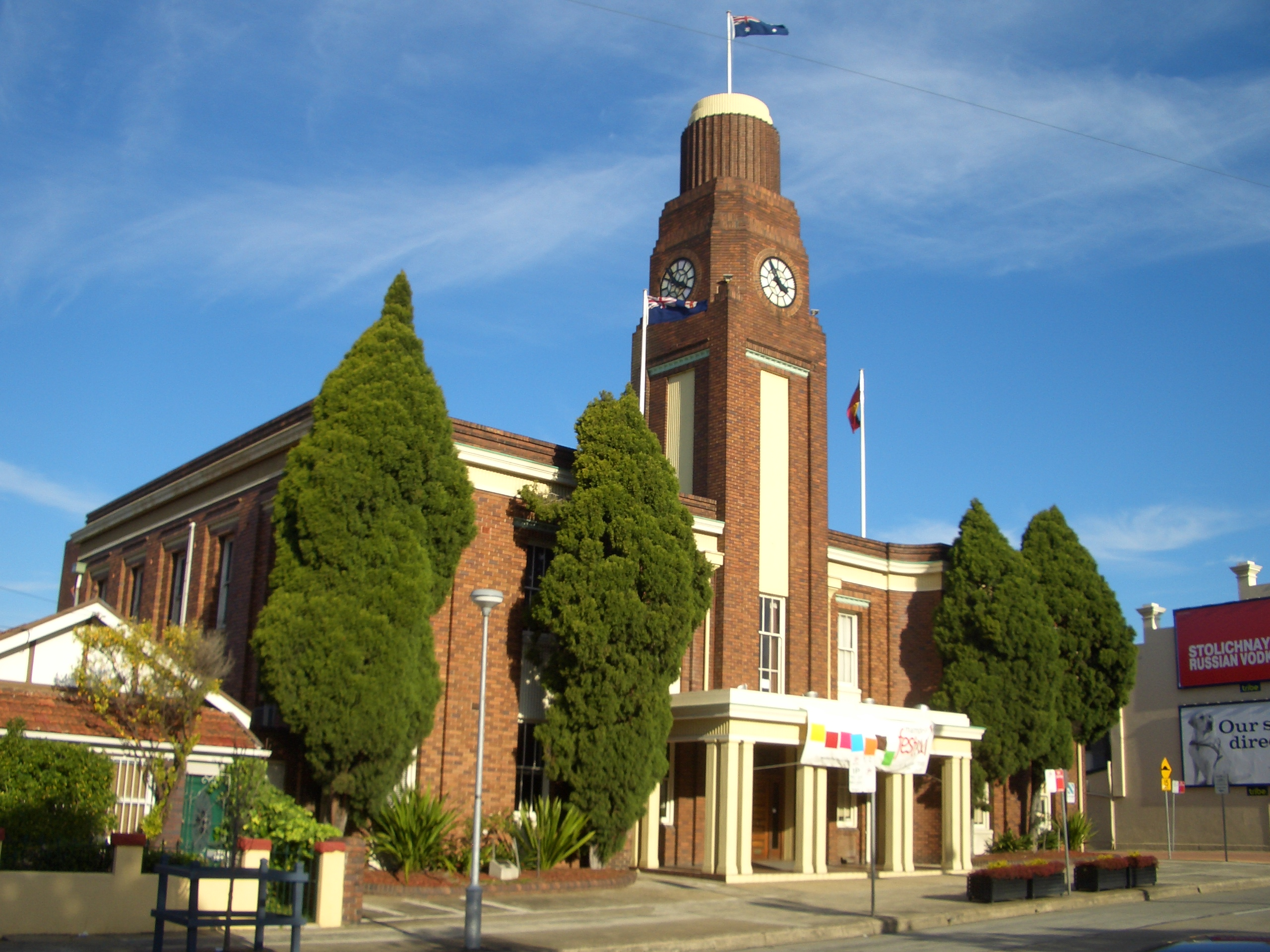
- Petersham Town Hall in 2006.
- Interactive map of the Petersham Town Hall area

General information
- Type: Government town hall
- Architectural style: Inter-War Stripped Classical
- Location: 107 Crystal Street, Petersham, New South Wales, Australia
- Coordinates: 33.8949°S 151.1574°E
- Construction started: 1937
- Completed: 1938
- Client: Petersham Municipal Council
- Owner: Inner West Council (current)

Design and construction
- Architecture firm: Rudder & Grout
- Main contractor: Hutcherson Bros

The Petersham Town Hall is a heritage-listed town hall located at 107 Crystal Street in Petersham, a suburb in the Inner West of Sydney, Australia. It was built in 1937–38 in the Inter-War Stripped Classical architectural style by architects Rudder & Grout, and replaced the first Petersham Town Hall on the site, which was designed in the Victorian Renaissance Revival style by Thomas Rowe in 1880–1882. The Town Hall was the seat of Petersham Municipal Council from 1938 to 1948 and from 1948 to 1974 was the seat of the Municipality of Marrickville, which absorbed Petersham. When the council moved to new offices across the street in 1974, the town hall has primarily been used as a meeting hall, community centre, filming location and archival office.

== First Town Hall, 1880–1937 ==
The foundation stone for the town hall was laid by mayor M. McMahon on 18 December 1880, with W. H. Pigott MLA opening proceedings. The Italianate structure was designed by Thomas Rowe, and the completed building was officially opened by the mayor, John Gelding, on 19 April 1882. The building, of brick on stone foundations, was completed in eighteen months, and included a library, masonic meeting room, caretaker's residence and on the upper floor a hall capable of seating 700 people, with a large stage and various ante-rooms, approached by three staircases. Its cost was estimated at £4000. The hall was demolished in 1937 as a cheaper alternative to remodelling.

The hall is of interest to aficionados of Gilbert and Sullivan, as the site of Australia's first production of Ruddigore, by the Petersham Choral Society, on 4–7 August 1908. It was not until 23 June 1927 that it was staged professionally, at the Theatre Royal, Adelaide by James Hay for J. C. Williamson's.

== Second Petersham Town Hall ==
The town hall's distinctive architecture and largely intact Art Deco interiors has made it a popular filming location for film and television, including Baz Luhrmann's Strictly Ballroom (1992), A Place to Call Home, 60 Minutes and Paper Giants.

== Heritage listing and conservation ==
The Town Hall was first listed in 2001 under the Marrickville Local Environment Plan (updated 2011) as "a good example of Art Deco civic architecture of the late 1930s. The strong vertical elements and exposed brickwork make it a dominant element within the area which developed as the municipal centre of Petersham from the 1880s. The Town Hall has been associated with a stream of influential people and continues to be an actively used and recognised resource to the local community. It is considered by the NSW RAIA to be an important twentieth century civic building. [...] Its stately Art Deco design, its location opposite the Marrickville Council administration building and Council Chambers make the Petersham Town Hall building an identifiable and actively used landmark within the municipality."

== Gallery ==
The first Town Hall c. 1890 prior to southern addition.

The first Town Hall showing trophy gun and 1892 Frederick St side addition, 11 September 1921.

== See also ==
- List of town halls in Sydney
- Architecture of Sydney
