= Spencer Hayman =

Australian rules footballer (1885–1946)

Personal information
- Full name: Spencer Lewis Hayman
- Born: 6 January 1885; Petersham, New South Wales
- Died: 14 September 1946 (aged 61); Bendigo, Victoria
- Original team: Scotch College

Playing career^{1}
| Years | Club | Games (Goals) |
| 1906 | Melbourne | 6 (0) |
- ^{1} Playing statistics correct to the end of 1906.

Spencer Lewis Hayman (6 January 1885 – 14 September 1946) was an Australian rules footballer who played with Melbourne in the Victorian Football League (VFL).

== Family ==
The son of Henry Hunt Hayman (1855–1925), and Rachel Hayman (−1913), née Solomon, Spencer Lewis Hayman was born in Petersham, New South Wales on 6 January 1885.

He married Agnes Lindsay Paltridge (1887–1962) on 22 January 1913.

One of their children, Captain Peter Spencer Hayman (1916–1942), served in the Second AIF with the 2nd/24th Infantry, was awarded the Military Cross in 1941, and was killed in action, in Libya, on 11 July 1942.

== Education ==
He attended Scotch College, Melbourne for four years (1897 to 1900), and played in the school's 1900 premiership-winning First XVIII.

== Football ==
=== North Adelaide (SAFA) ===
He was cleared from Melbourne to the North Adelaide Football Club in the South Australian Football Association (SAFA) in April 1910.

== Death ==
He died in Bendigo, Victoria, on 14 September 1946.
