= List of mayors of Petersham =

People who served as the mayor of the Municipality of Petersham are:

Mayors	Party	Term start	Term end	Notes
William Pigott	n/a	14 February 1872	10 February 1880	
Michael McMahon	n/a	10 February 1880	10 February 1881	
William Henry Paling	n/a	10 February 1881	15 February 1882	
John Gelding	n/a	15 February 1882	15 February 1884	
Henry Hughes	n/a	15 February 1884	11 February 1885	
William Davis	n/a	11 February 1885	10 February 1886	
John Wheeler	n/a	10 February 1886	11 February 1891	
Llewellyn Jones	n/a	11 February 1891	13 February 1894	
Alfred Rofe	n/a	13 February 1894	12 February 1897	
Percy Hordern	n/a	12 February 1897	10 February 1899	
Joseph Wetherill Cockbaine	n/a	10 February 1899	15 February 1901	
Henry Davis	n/a	15 February 1901	9 February 1903	
Percy Hordern	n/a	9 February 1903	16 February 1905	
Frederick Lawrence Langdon	n/a	16 February 1905	February 1908	
Percy Hordern	n/a	February 1908	February 1910	
Tom Hoskins	n/a	February 1910	February 1912	
Richard Barry	n/a	February 1912	17 September 1912	
John Wheeler	n/a	20 September 1912	31 January 1914	
Charles Henry Crammond	n/a	3 February 1914	2 February 1915	
Tom Hoskins	n/a	2 February 1915	February 1916	
John Henry Albert Weekley	n/a	February 1916	11 February 1918	
Richard Gendle	n/a	11 February 1918	February 1920	
Abraham Cropper	n/a	February 1920	December 1920	
John Allworth Clark	n/a	December 1920	December 1921	
William John Bastion	n/a	December 1921	7 December 1922	
David Robert Cooper	n/a	7 December 1922	December 1923	
Joseph Johnson	n/a	December 1923	December 1924	
Walter Lawrence Maundrell	n/a	December 1924	December 1925	
John Henry Albert Weekley	n/a	December 1925	December 1926	
Gilbert Barry	n/a	December 1926	December 1927	
Arthur Whiteley	n/a	December 1927	December 1928	
Thomas Casserley	n/a	December 1928	December 1929	
James Bain	n/a	December 1929	December 1930	
Ernest Albert McKinley	n/a	December 1930	January 1932	
Arthur Whiteley	n/a	January 1932	December 1932	
Joseph Johnson	n/a	December 1932	December 1933	
Jacob Lauder Raith	n/a	December 1933	December 1934	
Walter Lawrence Maundrell	n/a	December 1934	December 1935	
John Alexander Stewart	n/a	December 1935	December 1936	
Robert John Hoskins	n/a	December 1936	December 1937	
Joseph Johnson	n/a	December 1937	December 1938	
Walter Lawrence Maundrell	n/a	December 1938	December 1939	
Fred Cahill	Labor	December 1939	December 1940	
Sydney Hastie Bain	Labor	December 1940	December 1941	
John Friel Laxton		December 1941	December 1943	
Hilton Gregory Clifford		December 1943	December 1944	
John Friel Laxton		December 1944	31 December 1948	
