= Results of the 1931 New South Wales local elections =

- 5 December 1931

This is a list of local government area results for the 1931 New South Wales local elections.

== Cootamundra ==
1931 Cootamundra Municipal Council election
- 5 December 1931

All 9 seats on Cootamundra Municipal Council 5 seats needed for a majority

Of the 9 members of the previous council, 8 sought reëlection. Alderman E. C. Bartley, who was the previous Mayor and had served on the council for 40 years, did not seek reëlection. Aldermen Dickson, Barr, Conkey, and Brady were successful. Aldermen Nicholson, Rankin, Legge, and J. Mitchell were unsuccessful.

Several of the candidates not elected were members of the ALP, however P. Frain was the only one to publicly announce his allegiance to the Lang Plan.

=== Cootamundra Results ===
1931 New South Wales local elections: Municipality of Cootamundra
Party	Candidate	Votes	%	±%
Independent	F. R. Dickson (elected)	973		
Independent	R. Barr (elected)	969		
Independent	F. Mitchell (elected)	892		
Independent	L. Conkey (elected)	881		
Independent	D. Maxwell (elected)	735		
Independent	J. Brady (elected)	731		
Independent	R. F. Gibson (elected)	664		
Independent	A. Elphick (elected)	662		
Independent	J. W. Kirley (elected)	637		
	T. Nicholson	623		
	J. T. Rankin	586		
	F. Holden	546		
	J. T. Renehan	531		
	F. C. Legge	507		
	J. Holihan	443		
	J. M. Walsh	423		
	P. M'Ternan	333		
	W. A. Resch	311		
	H. A. Schofield	300		
Lang Plan	P. Frain	261		
	J. Mitchell	237		
	J. Reardon	141		
	E. E. Evans	101		
	R. Matheson	78		
Total formal votes				
Informal votes				
Registered electors				
Turnout				

== Corowa ==
1931 Corowa Municipal Council election
- 5 December 1931

All 9 seats on Corowa Municipal Council 5 seats needed for a majority

All incumbent aldermen were re-elected with the exception of G. Handasyde who was replaced by W. Fraser. Fraser and E. Dawe were the only newcomer candidates.

=== Corowa Results ===
1931 New South Wales local elections: Corowa Municipality
Party	Candidate	Votes	%	±%
Independent	J. Chivell (elected)	446		
Independent	F. J. Sammons (elected)	436		
Independent	T. J. Nagle (elected)	411		
Independent	H. G. Norton (elected)	392		
Independent	R. W. E. Fraser (elected)	389		
Independent	G. H. Sackrell (elected)	365		
Independent	D. H. Dawborn (elected)	360		
Independent	A. G. Phillips (elected)	328		
Independent	J. M'Donald (elected)	326		
Independent	G. M. Handasyde	308		
Independent	E. J. Dawe	280		
Total formal votes				
Informal votes				
Registered electors				
Turnout				

== Hay ==
1931 Hay Municipal Council election
- 5 December 1931

All 9 seats on Hay Municipal Council 5 seats needed for a majority
- Registered: ~1,700
- Turnout: 733
	First party	Second party
	IND	ALP
Party	Independents	Labor
Seats won	7 (Note: Two of the elected candidates ran on both the Independent and the Labor tickets)	4 (Note: Two of the elected candidates ran on both the Independent and the Labor tickets)
Largest party before election
Independents
Largest party after election
Independents

Three of the incumbent aldermen – Messrs. J. McKinney, H. Lugsdin, and J. A. Smith – chose not to seek reëlection. The candidates consisted of the remaining incumbent aldermen – Messrs. W. Hill, W. Murray Jr., J. Spence, E. Wilkinson, J. Speer, and J. Morgan – and ten others who were mostly newcomers but also included former alderman W. G. Miles.

There were two lists on the ballot, a Labor list and an independent list. As a result of the lists not each having enough candidates to fill their ranks on the ballot, two candidates agreed to appear on both lists. These were J. J. Spence and C. G. Keyes. It was noted by commentators at the time that the electors did not follow the lists when casting their votes, however it was also suggested that Mr. Keyes's success in being elected was in part due to his appearance on the two lists.

Notably, a number of the new candidates contesting the election held qualifications in engineering, a useful asset to council and one that, according to many, made these candidates very desirable to the ratepayer and council. However, this also caused some controversy as allegations were made that one of these candidates would give preferential treatment to his employer if elected in the contracting of council services.

The election was, at the time, the municipality's greatest ever turnout result. Of approximately 1,700 registered electors, 733 ballots were cast. Of those ballots, 13 were informal and 720 (equal to 6,480 votes) were formal.

Mr. T. F. Cook, who also served as Town Clerk, was the returning officer for the election.

The election resulted in 7 members of the Independent ticket and 4 members of the Labor ticket being elected, including both of the dual ticket candidates. Of these, 4 were incumbents who were returned to their posts.

Ald. Wilkinson was returned to his position as Mayor following the election.

=== Hay Results ===
1931 New South Wales local elections: Municipality of Hay (Note: Sources are unclear on the party affiliations of many candidates.)
Party	Candidate	Votes	%	±%
Independent	John McN. Spence (Note: Appeared on both the independent and the Labor tickets) (elected)	598		
Labor	John McN. Spence (elected)	598		
	John C. Wilkinson (elected)	561		
	James Speer (elected)	628		
Independent	Edward W. Wilkinson (elected)	509		
	J. Alan Gibson (elected)	498		
	Jack Morgan (elected)	466		
	William G. Miles (elected)	429		
	Allan C. Sandow (elected)	418		
Independent	Charles G. Keyes (elected)	400		
Labor	Charles G. Keyes (elected)	400		
	Wentworth M. Hill	379		
	Charles L. Lincolne	345		
	Edward G. Cansdell	343		
	Ronald G. Baker	334		
	Will O'Donnell	301		
	William J. Murray Jr.	214		
	John P. Sloan	158		
Total formal votes		6,480		
Informal ballots		13		
Registered electors		~1,700		
Turnout		733		

== Junee ==
1931 Junee Municipal Council election
- 5 December 1931

All 9 seats on Junee Municipal Council 5 seats needed for a majority
	First party	Second party
	IND	ALP
Party	Independents	Labor
Seats won	8	1
Largest party after election
Independents

Ronald Cuttle (who served as mayor during the previous term) C. J. O'Sullivan, F. A. Commins, R. A. Matheson, and J. D. Purcell were all re-elected. Three alderman – Harris, Keast, and Martin – did not run for re-election, and were replaced by W. J. Hiscock, A. S. Leahy, A. W. Slater, and P. J. Benham.

The Labor Party endorsed five candidates, with only P. J. Benham successful.

=== Junee results ===
1931 New South Wales local elections: Junee Municipality
Party	Candidate	Votes	%	±%
Independent	C. J. O'Sullivan (elected)	803		
Independent	F. A. Commins (elected)	795		
Independent	Ronald Cuttle (elected)	774		
Independent	W. J. Hiscock (elected)	738		
Independent	R. A. Matheson (elected)	726		
Independent	J. D. Purcell (elected)	681		
Independent	A. W. Slater (elected)	583		
Labor	P. J. Benham (elected)	551		
Independent	A. S. Leahy (elected)	539		
Labor	L. W. Hopkins	483		
Labor	H. J. Pead	398		
Labor	W. M. Peacock	372		
Labor	A. J. Carroll	367		
Independent	P. J. O'Sullivan	320		
Total formal votes		8,130		
Informal votes				
Registered electors				
Turnout		902		

== Narrandera ==
1931 Narrandera Municipal Council election
- 5 December 1931

All 9 seats on Narandera Municipal Council 5 seats needed for a majority
	First party	Second party
	IND	LANG
Party	Independents	Lang Plan
Seats won	9	0
Popular vote		1,323
Largest party before election
Independents
Largest party after election
Independents

Incumbent aldermen Yeoman, Barker, Beard, Kent, Harden, Newth, and Maney were all re-elected, alongside newcomers Babbs and Thomas. Aldermen R. H. Hankinson and E. Edwards did not seek re-election.

=== Narandera results ===
1931 New South Wales local elections: Municipality of Narrandera
Party	Candidate	Votes	%	±%
Independent	F. T. Yeoman (elected)	723		
Independent	F. H. Barker (elected)	686		
Independent	J. B. Beard (elected)	661		
Independent	J. Babbs (elected)	650		
Independent	J. Thomas (elected)	586		
Independent	W. C. Kent (elected)	564		
Independent	W. Harden (elected)	561		
Independent	J. D. Newth (elected)	538		
Independent	T. H. Maney (elected)	501		
Lang Plan	E. W. Bray	358		
Lang Plan	A. Baird	349		
Lang Plan	J. S. Dick	339		
Lang Plan	O. F. Pippen	277		
Total formal votes				
Informal votes				
Registered electors				
Turnout				

== Temora ==
1931 Temora Municipal Council election
- 5 December 1931

All 9 seats on Temora Municipal Council 5 seats needed for a majority
	First party	Second party	Third party
	IND	UCP	ALP
Leader	N/A	W. Giles	L. G. Morton
Party	Independents	United Country	Labor
Seats won	9	0	0
Largest party after election
Independents

Seven of the eight members of the preceding council who ran for reëlection were successful. These were Aldermen Gibson, Bland, Nixon, Ryan, Callaghan, and Nicholson.

W. Giles, who was mayor during the previous council term but was unsuccessful in seeking reëlection, was president of the Temora branch of the United Country Party. Candidate L. G. Morton was president of the Temora ALP branch.

=== Temora Results ===
1931 New South Wales local elections: Temora Municipality
Party	Candidate	Votes	%	±%
Independent	W. Gibson (elected)	792		
Independent	T. J. Meagher (elected)	786		
Independent	N. W. Bland (elected)	783		
Independent	W. Nixon (elected)	771		
Independent	H. C. Brady (elected)	760		
Independent	W. T. Ryan (elected)	628		
Independent	W. Callaghan (elected)	626		
Independent	A. W. Denyer (elected)	595		
Independent	H. Nicholson (elected)	488		
United Country	W. Giles	483		
Independent	F. T. Hingerty	453		
Labor	L. G. Morton	413		
Total formal votes				
Informal votes				
Registered electors				
Turnout				

== Tumut ==
1931 Tumut Shire Council election
- 5 December 1931

All 8 seats on Tumut Shire Council 5 seats needed for a majority
	First party	Second party
	IND	LANG
Party	Independents	Lang Plan
Last election	Council did not exist	Council did not exist
Seats won	8	0
Seat change	▲8	Steady
Popular vote	4,793	55
Largest party before election
Independent
Largest party after election
Independents

This was Tumut Shire's first election after the Municipality of Tumut and Gadara Shire were amalgamated in 1928 and a provisional council was placed in charge.

Harry Godfrey, who served as Shire President on the previous council, was re-elected to his seat on the council in B Riding at the new council's first meeting on Thursday, the 17th of December.

After the election Cr. Elphick was returned to his post as Deputy President unanimously on the motion of Councillors Herring and Baker.

At that same meeting, Cr. Crain announced that he would move a motion at the next meeting, which was set to be on the 31st of January, "that the matter of equal representation for each riding on an adult franchise be submitted to the Minister for Local Government for his consideration".

=== A Riding ===
1931 New South Wales local elections: Tumut Shire (A Riding)
Party	Candidate	Votes	%	±%
Independent	R. J. Benson (elected)	406		
Independent	S. Brain (elected)	405		
Independent	J. Young	369		
Independent	W. Hassett	354		
Independent	Thos. P. Arragon	280		
Independent	J. Roche	142		
Total formal votes		1,956		
Informal votes		13		
Registered electors				
Turnout				

=== B Riding ===
1931 New South Wales local elections: Tumut Shire (B Riding)
Party	Candidate	Votes	%	±%
Independent	Harry Godfrey (elected)	246		
Independent	G. Clout (elected)	213		
Independent	F. B. Turnbull	95		
Total formal votes		554		
Informal votes		9		
Registered electors				
Turnout				

=== C Riding ===
1931 New South Wales local elections: Tumut Shire (C Riding)
Party	Candidate	Votes	%	±%
Independent	T. J. O'Brien (elected)	374		
Independent	A. E. Herring (elected)	314		
Independent	A. N. Stacey	258		
Independent	F. J. Bourke	156		
Total formal votes		1,102		
Informal votes		15		
Registered electors				
Turnout				

=== D Riding ===
1931 New South Wales local elections: Tumut Shire (D Riding)
Party	Candidate	Votes	%	±%
Independent	F. L. Baker (elected)	492		
Independent	J. Alphick (elected)	393		
Independent	A. N. Fuller	204		
Independent	D. Quinn	92		
Lang Plan	J. E. Madigan	55		
Total formal votes		1,236		
Informal votes		11		
Registered electors				
Turnout				

== Wagga Wagga ==
1931 Wagga Wagga Borough Council election
- 5 December 1931

All 12 seats on Wagga Wagga Borough Council 7 seats needed for a majority
- Registered: 6,072
- Turnout: 3,939 (65%)
	First party	Second party	Third party
	CITZ	LANG	IND
Party	Citizens	Lang Plan	Independents
Last election	Did not exist
Seats before	5
Seats won	12	0
Seat change	▲7
Popular vote	35,993	5,740	4,426
Largest group after election
Citizens

Wagga Wagga Borough Council was composed of a single ward electing 12 aldermen. A Citizens' Committee, formed prior to the election to endorse candidates (including five incumbent aldermen), won all seats.

=== Wagga Wagga results ===
1931 New South Wales local elections: Borough of Wagga Wagga
Party	Candidate	Votes	%	±%
Citizens	Henry Dedrick Lampe (elected)	3,307		
Citizens	Henry McDonough (elected)	3,177		
Citizens	Edward Collins (elected)	3,134		
Citizens	William John Stevenson (elected)	3,134		
Citizens	Ernest Frank Sleff (elected)	3,019		
Citizens	Walter Slade Hardy (elected)	3,024		
Citizens	Arthur Cecil Morgan (elected)	3,012		
Citizens	Hughie Leslie Condon (elected)	2,959		
Citizens	Richard Giltinan (elected)	2,889		
Citizens	Ernest Arthur Shoemark (elected)	2,850		
Citizens	John Henry Victor Scott (elected)	2,777		
Citizens	Edwin Fenn Lusher (elected)	2,711		
Lang Plan	Lynden Regan	766		
Lang Plan	Charles H. Jensen	709		
Lang Plan	Kenneth Campbell	604		
Lang Plan	Walter Henry Mitchell	545		
Lang Plan	George Finn	533		
Lang Plan	Alexander Alfred Argus	482		
Lang Plan	Frederick Hannam Phillips	480		
Lang Plan	Albert Ernest Bloomfield	450		
Lang Plan	Edward Thomas Rudd	425		
Lang Plan	Leonard William Wilcox	412		
Lang Plan	James Knight	334		
Independent	William James Peacock	1,636		
Independent	Frederick Stuart Middlemiss	1,442		
Independent	Charles Clegg	788		
Independent	Sydney Henry Broad	560		
Total formal votes		43,765		
Informal votes				
Registered electors		6,072		
Turnout		3,939	65.0	

== Willimbong ==
1931 Willimbong Shire Council election
- 5 December 1931

All 8 seats on Willimbong Shire Council 5 seats needed for a majority
- Registered: 1,149 (Note: Excluding Riding B which was uncontested)
- Turnout: 698 (60.7%)
	First party	Second party	Third party
	IND	IND	ALP
Party	Independents	Ind. Labor	Labor
Last election	7 seats	1 seat	Did not contest
Seats before	7	1	0
Seats won	7	1	0
Seat change	Steady	Steady	Steady
Popular vote	1,307	0 (Note: Independent Labor only ran in Riding B where a vote was not held and the candidates who stood were elected unopposed)	89
Percentage	93.6%	0%	6.4%
Swing	▲2.8	N/A	▲6.4
Largest party before election
Independents
Largest party after election
Independents

Willimbong Shire Council was composed of four two-member wards, totalling eight councillors.

Independents retained a majority, winning seven seats, while Independent Labor councillor Ambrose George Enticknap was re-elected in Riding B.

Following the election, Riding A councillor F. C. Mountford was elected Shire President at a council meeting on 15 December 1931.

=== Willimbong results ===
1931 New South Wales local elections: Willimbong Shire
Party	Votes	%	Swing	Seats	Change
Independents	1,307	93.6	+2.8	7	Steady
Labor	89	6.4	+6.4	0	Steady
Independent Labor	0	0.0	N/A	1	Steady
Total formal votes	1,396				
Total formal ballots	698	100.0			
Informal votes					
Turnout	698	60.7			
Registered voters	1,149				

=== Riding A ===
1931 New South Wales local elections: Willimbong (Riding A)
Party	Candidate	Votes	%	±%
Independent	F. C. Mountford (elected)	250	29.2	+29.2
Independent	Tom J. Ashton (elected)	160	18.7	+18.7
Independent	A. T. McKay	158	18.5	−13.2
Independent	A. T. Cox	122	14.3	+14.3
Independent	William "Bill" J. Adams	77	9.0	−18.6
Labor	W. E. Whybrow	48	5.6	+5.6
Labor	S. P. Dart	41	4.8	+4.8
Total formal votes		856		+
Informal votes		5 or 8 (Note: Conflicting source)		
Registered electors		592		
Turnout		428	72.3	

=== Riding B ===
1931 New South Wales local elections: Willimbong (Riding B)
Party	Candidate	Votes	%	±%
Independent Labor	Ambrose George Enticknap (elected)	unopposed		
Independent	R. Struck (elected)	unopposed		
Registered electors				

=== Riding C ===
1931 New South Wales local elections: Willimbong (Riding C)
Party	Candidate	Votes	%	±%
Independent	John Sylvester Dooley (elected)	142	41.8	+15.7
Independent	C. A. McCormack (elected)	103	30.2	+30.2
Independent	A. Jamieson	95	27.9	−12.5
Total formal votes		340		−
Informal votes		8 or 5		
Registered electors		362		
Turnout		170	47.0	

=== Riding D ===
1931 New South Wales local elections: Willimbong (Riding D)
Party	Candidate	Votes	%	±%
Independent	H. L. Tooth (elected)	61	30.5	+30.5
Independent	T. Darchy (elected)	54	27.0	+7.3
Independent	F. J. Blackmore	47	23.5	−8.2
Independent	J. McCleary	38	19.0	−5.6
Total formal votes		200		+
Informal votes		5		
Registered electors		195		
Turnout		100	51.3	

== Yanko ==
1931 Yanko Shire Council election
- 5 December 1931

All 6 seats on Yanko Shire Council 4 seats needed for a majority
Largest party before election
Independents
Largest party after election
Independents

=== Yanko Results ===
1931 New South Wales local elections: Yanko Shire A Riding
Party	Candidate	Votes	%	±%
Independent	A. J. I. Bull (elected unopposed)	—	—	—
Independent	W. R. Seilley (elected unopposed)	—	—	—
Total formal votes		—	—	—
Informal votes		—	—	—
Registered electors				
Turnout		—	—	—

1931 New South Wales local elections: Yanko Shire B Riding
Party	Candidate	Votes	%	±%
Independent	J. G. F. Nolen (elected)			
Independent	J. Woods (elected)			
Independent	J. Gow			
Independent	J. M'Duff			
Total formal votes				
Informal votes				
Registered electors				
Turnout				
J. Nolen hold				
J. Woods gain from J. Gow				

1931 New South Wales local elections: Yanko Shire C Riding
Party	Candidate	Votes	%	±%
Independent	W. Bickit (elected unopposed)	—	—	—
Independent	A. A. Kool (elected unopposed)	—	—	—
Total formal votes		—	—	—
Informal votes		—	—	—
Registered electors				
Turnout		—	—	—

== Young ==
1931 Young Municipal Council election
- 5 December 1931

All 9 seats on Young Municipal Council 5 seats needed for a majority

Alderman Lazzari who was mayor on the previous council was the only candidate not elected. He faced a defamation allegation from Alderman Stewart who sought a writ of £4,000.

=== Young results ===
1931 New South Wales local elections: Young
Party	Candidate	Votes	%	±%
Independent	T. Steel (elected)	906		
Independent	C. J. Weston (elected)	889		
Independent	T. C. Truscott (elected)	791		
Independent	R. N. Blackett (elected)	786		
Independent	J. Stewart (elected)	642		
Independent	A. M. Rabbetts (elected)	607		
Independent	A. J. M. Purchas (elected)	600		
Independent	J. McInerney (elected)	595		
Independent	H. Bray (elected)	582		
Independent	H. F. Lazzarini	385		
Total formal votes				
Informal votes				
Registered electors				
Turnout				
