= 1931 New South Wales local elections =

Local government elections in New South Wales, Australia

← 1928	5 December 1931	1934 →

254 of the 256 local government areas in New South Wales

The 1931 New South Wales local elections were held on 5 December 1931 to elect the councils of 254 of the 256 the local government areas (LGAs) of New South Wales.

The elections in Camden and Cumberland were postponed until 2 January 1932.

== Electoral system ==
Some councils used proportional representation. For the first time, candidates were grouped on the ballot by political affiliation, rather than in alphabetical order.

In Armidale, the grouping system was not used.

== Candidates ==
The elections took place several months after a split in the New South Wales Labor Party. The state Labor Party endorsed 573 candidates, including many who publicly supported the "Lang Plan". These candidates were required to sign a pledge stating their support for Jack Lang. The federal Labor Party executive also endorsed a number of candidates. In Boorowa, there was a group of Independent Labor candidates.

The Communist Party endorsed 120 candidates across 20 municipalities.

== Results ==
Labor suffered losses across the state.
