= Percy Hordern =

Australian politician & businessman (1864–1926)

The Honourable Percy Hordern

Member of New South Wales Legislative Council
- In office 30 August 1921 – 1 April 1926

Personal details
- Born: 1 January 1864 Darlinghurst, New South Wales
- Died: 7 April 1926 (aged 62) Lewisham, New South Wales
- Party: Labor Party
- Spouse: Annie (née Wright)
- Children: 5 daughters and 5 sons
- Occupation: Draper

Percy Grose Hordern (1 January 1864 – 1 April 1926) was an Australian businessman, politician and a member of the New South Wales Legislative Council for the Labor Party. Hordern was a member of the influential Hordern family and for many years ran a drapery business.

== Family and education ==
Hordern was born in Darlinghurst, Sydney, Australia, the second son of Edward Hordern (1838–1883) and his wife Emily (ca.1842–1865), née Grose. After the death of his mother, his father married again, on 17 November 1866, to Christiana Matilda Stack. His first home was at 676 George Street, then "Milton House", Darlinghurst Road, then "Chatsworth", Potts Point. Percy attended Newington College from 1874 until 1878, whilst the school was situated at Newington House on the Parramatta River.

== Marriage ==
Hordern married Annie Wright (1865–1939) on 17 February 1885. Zanobi, in Petersham, was given to the young couple as a wedding present from his family.

== Business career ==
Hordern assisted in the management of the family business, which prospered and moved to 668–670 George Street and in 1881 his father retired, leaving the business in the hands of his sons Edward jun. and Percy and Mr. Hugh Kittson, trading as Edward Hordern and Sons. In August 1889 he began as a sole trader in a new building at 666 (George Street) Brickfield Hill, promoted as the "modern shop". and employing numerous small punchy advertisements rather than the conventional single, large, detailed panel of information then prevalent. The business prospered and expanded but in 1901 Percy announced his intention to retire, and on 15 February 1902 the shop ceased trading, the premises being taken over by his brother Edward Hordern. As an investor he owned city property and he served as a trustee of Barrack Street Savings Bank. From 1920 he was a member of the Metropolitan Meat Industry Board.

== Public office ==
Hordern was an Alderman on Petersham Council from 1895 until 1917. He served as Mayor from 1897 until 1898, 1903 until 1905, 1908 until 1910. He was a life appointment to the NSW Legislative Council and served for four years, seven months and three days. He was commissioned as a Justice of the Peace in 1899.

Civic offices
Preceded by Alfred Rofe	Mayor of Petersham; 1897 – 1899	Succeeded by Joseph Cockbaine
Preceded by Henry Davis	Mayor of Petersham; 1903 – 1905	Succeeded by Frederick Langdon
Preceded by Frederick Langdon	Mayor of Petersham; 1908 – 1910	Succeeded by Tom Hoskins
