= Petersham Park =

Park in New South Wales, Australia

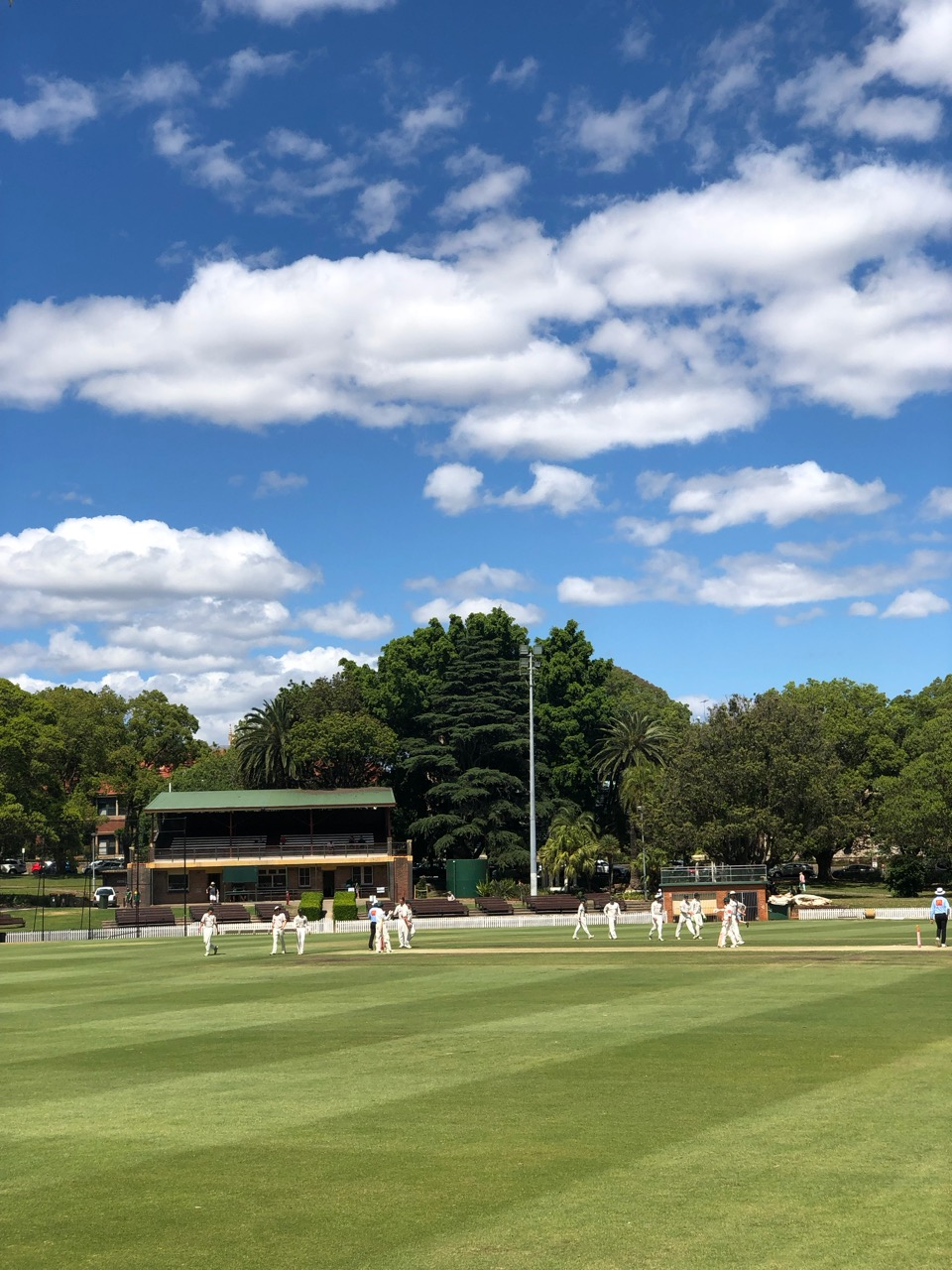
- Cricket in Petersham Park

- Location within Sydney
- Type: urban park, sports ground
- Location: Petersham, Sydney, New South Wales, Australia
- Coordinates: 33°53.5′S 151°09′E
- Opened: 1887

Petersham Park is an urban park located in the Inner West of Sydney, New South Wales, Australia. The park is characterised by well established avenues of brush box and camphor laurel trees.

Facilities in Petersham Park include a cricket oval, a rotunda, a children's playground, and the Fanny Durack Aquatic Centre. The oval is used for cricket in the summer months and baseball in winter.

There are weekly visits to the park by the Inner West Council initiative called the Magic Yellow Bus, which offers free activities for children aged six years and under.

== History ==
Previously a part of William Charles Wentworth's estate, Petersham Park was officially opened on 28 September 1887. Petersham Cricket Club has played at the park since the 1880s.

Originally part of the Petersham Town Hall, the ANZAC Memorial gates at the Brighton Street entrance to the park were re-erected in their current location in 1921.

On 27 November 1926, Donald Bradman scored his first century in grade cricket at Petersham Park as an 18 year old playing for St George against Petersham. The D. Seddon Pavilion on the west side of the oval commemorates Dudley Seddon, and the T.J.E. Andrews scoreboard is named after local player Tommy Andrews.

Petersham Park Swimming Pool opened to the public in September 1962, and was named after Fanny Durack in 1999. Between 2012 and 2014 the pool was closed for a refurbishment, which included replacement of the six lane, 33-metre pool with an eight lane, 25-metre pool.

In February 2015, local residents and community action group Save Petersham Park organised a picnic and hundreds of signed complaints to protest an UrbanGrowth proposal to remove approximately 80 houses and build WestConnex exit roads into the park area.

== Gallery ==
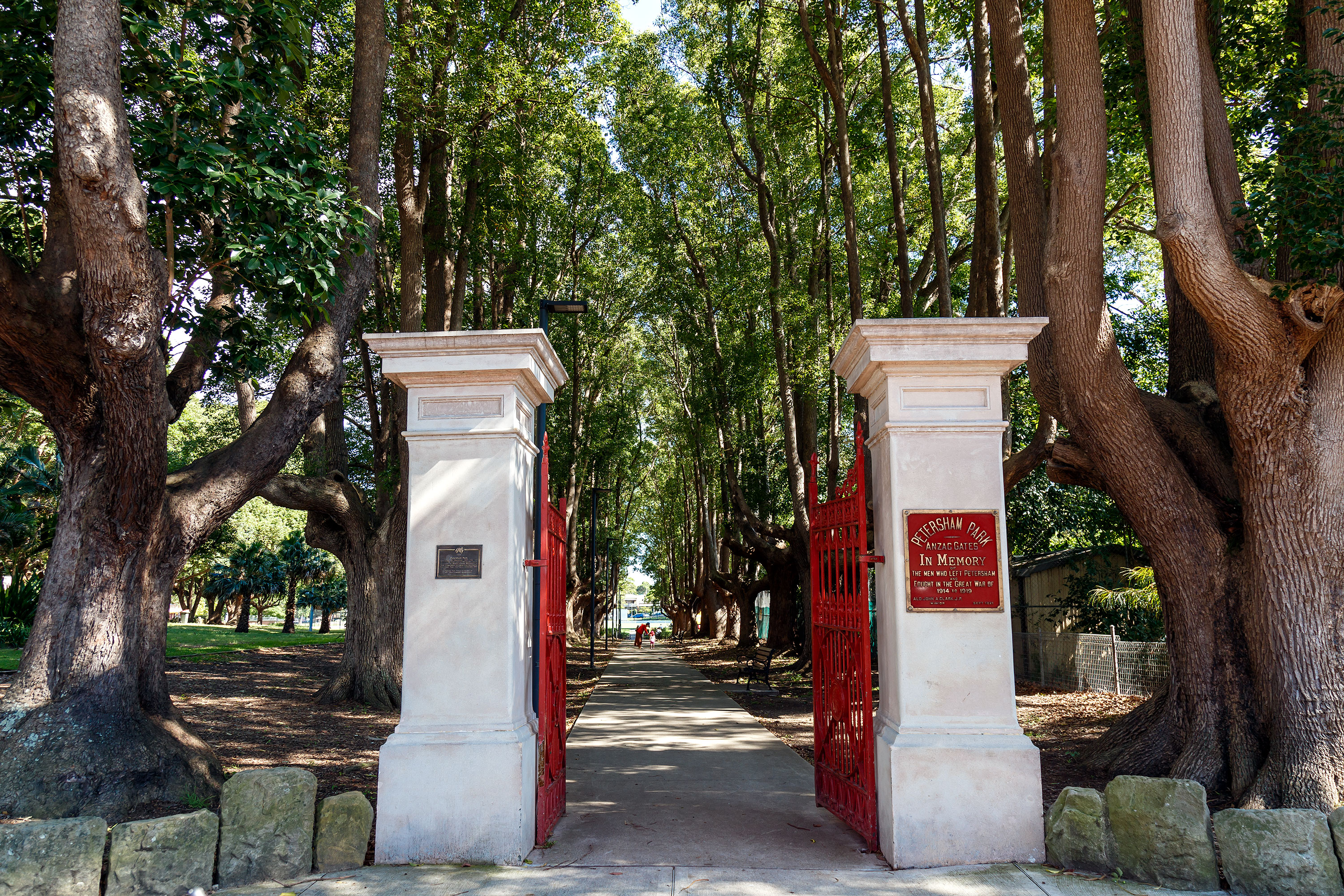
Petersham Park Gate on Brighton Street

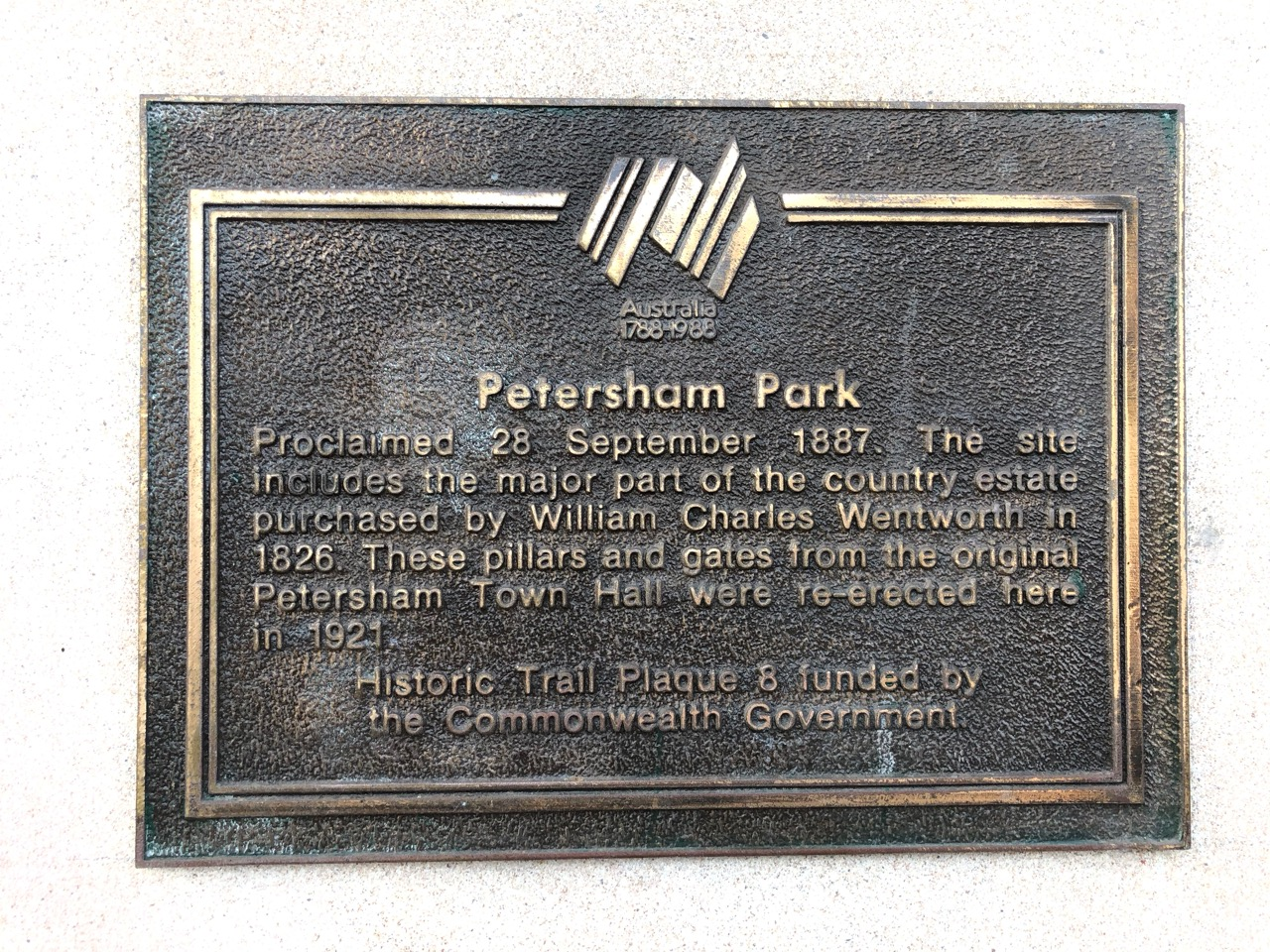
Plaque 1

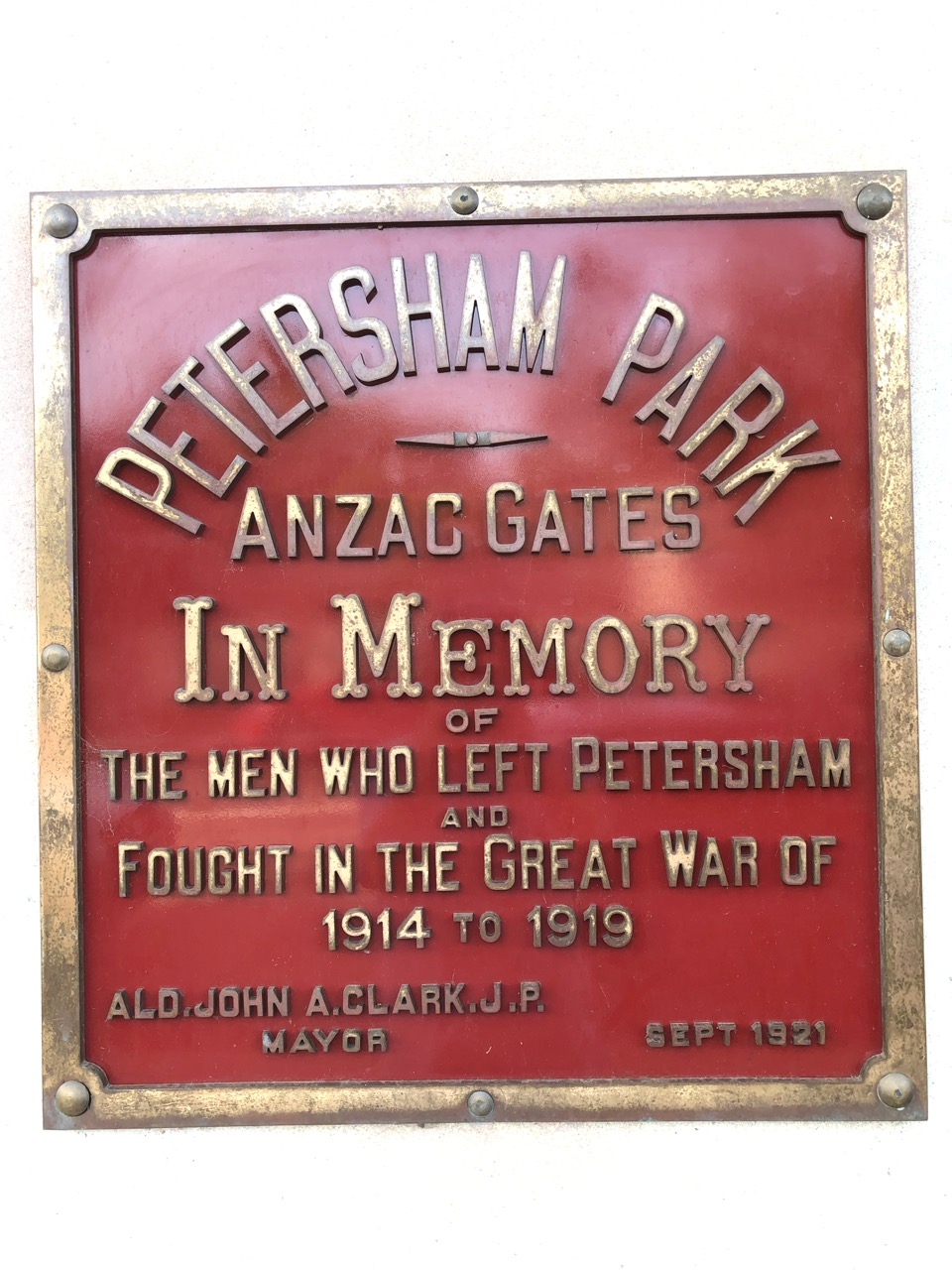
Plaque 2

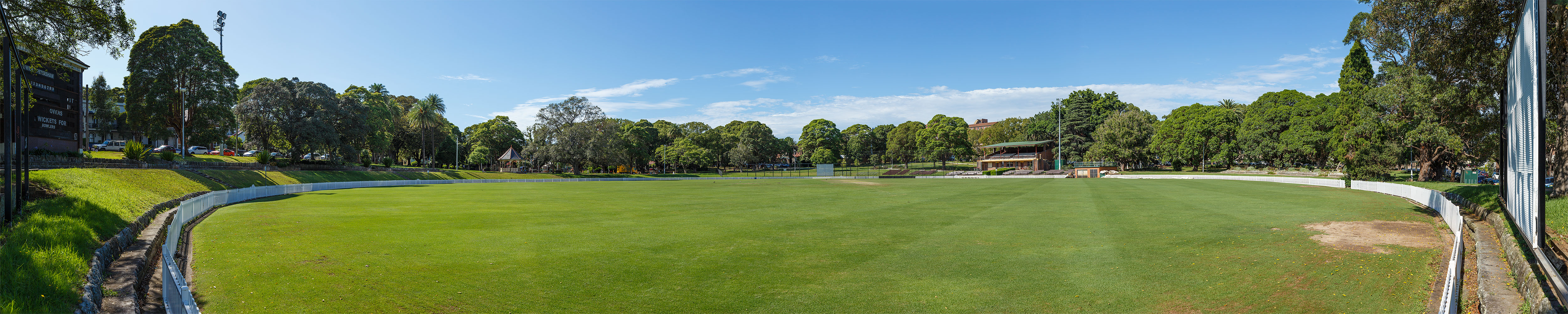
Petersham Oval

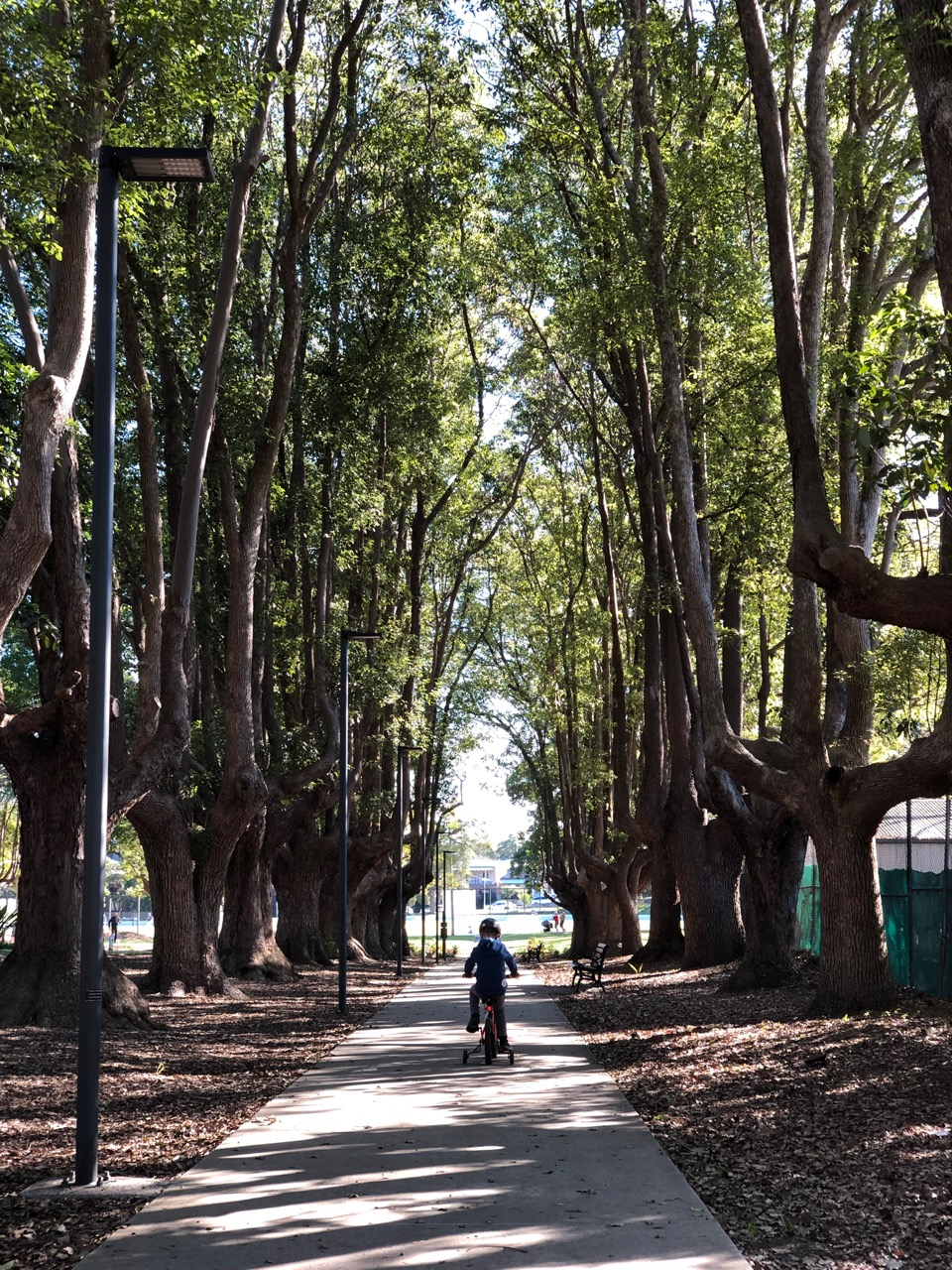
Petersham Park Pathway

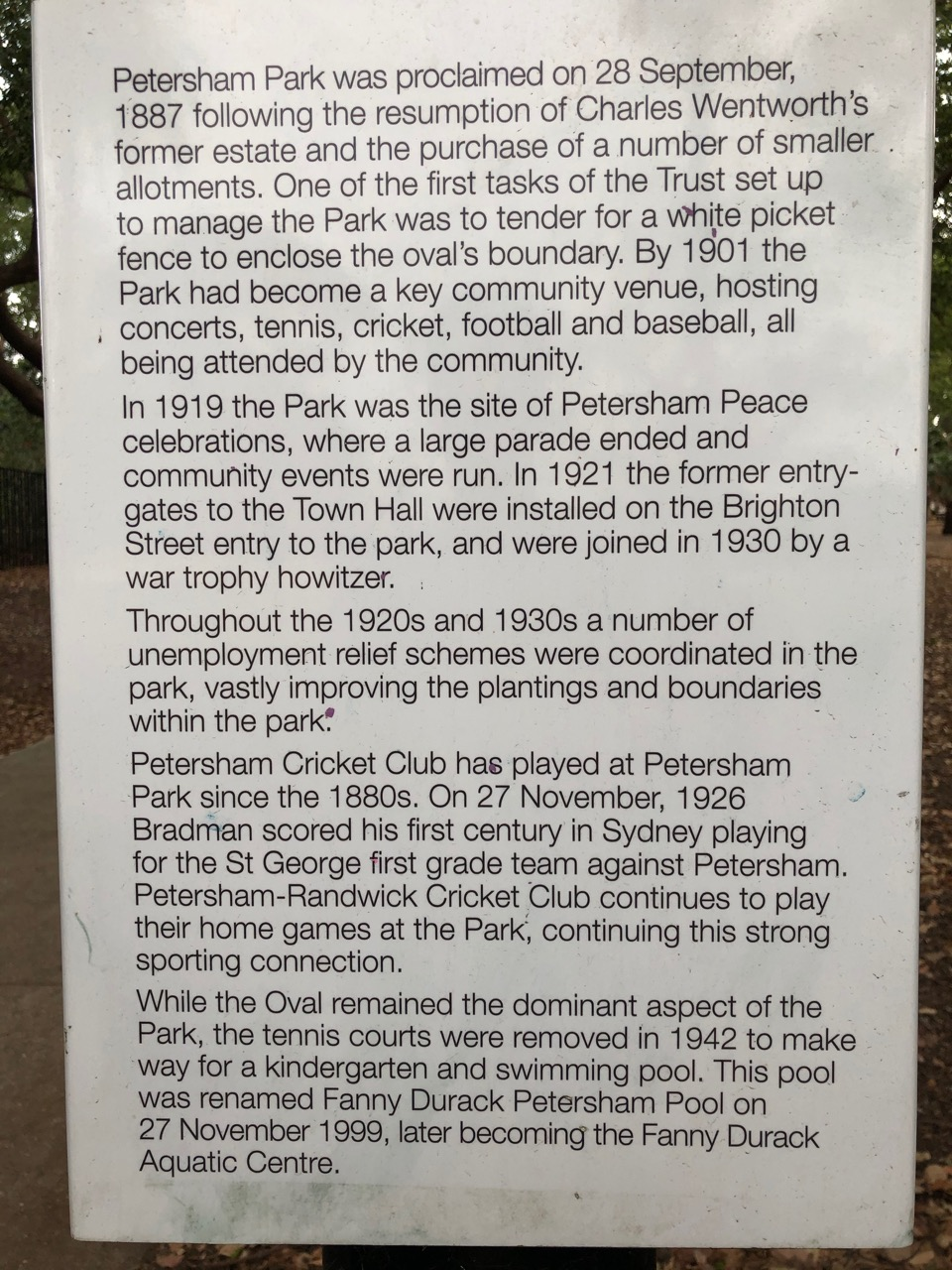
Historical information sign

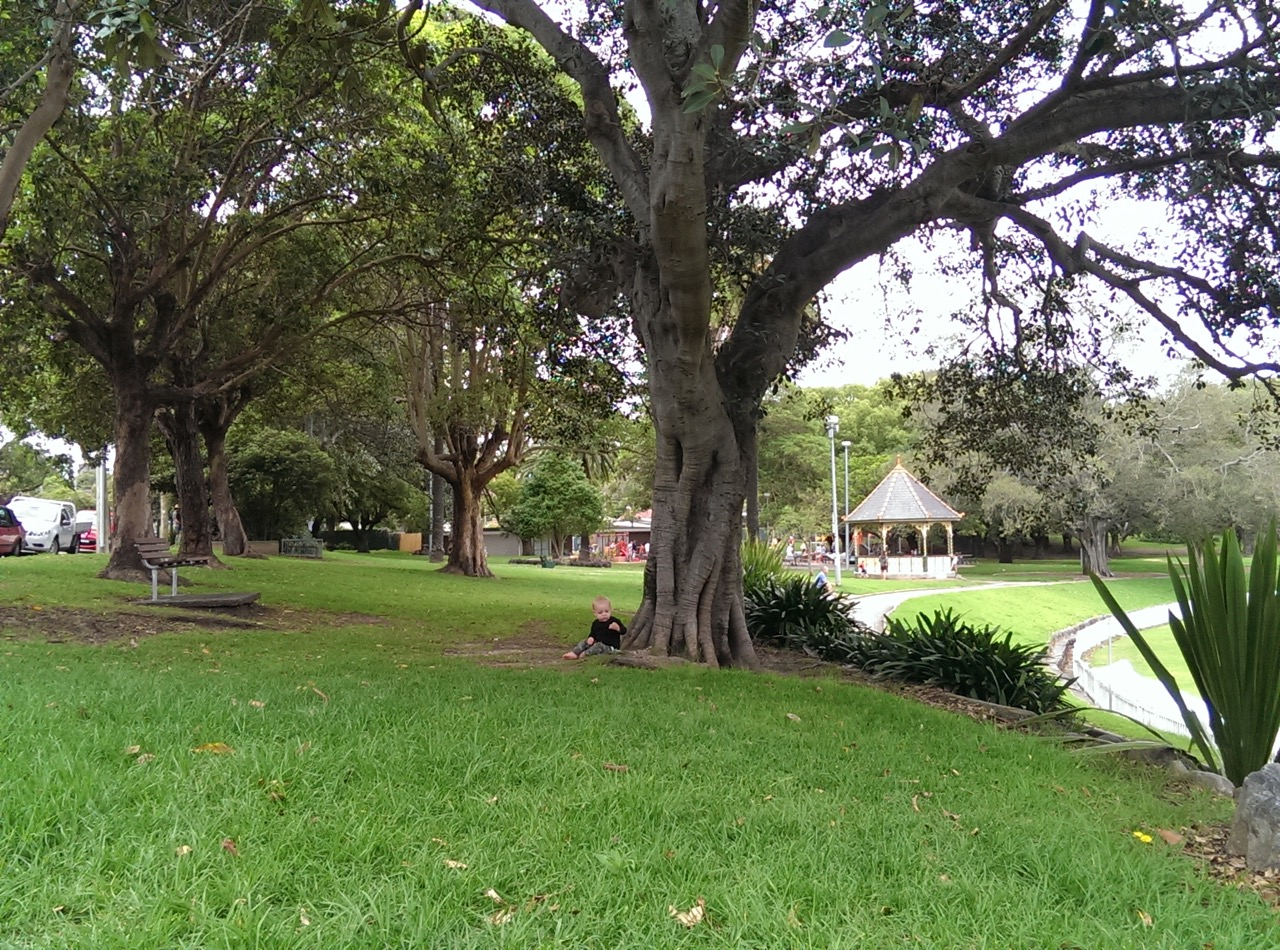
Petersham Park Trees & Rotunda
