= Petersham, New South Wales =

Petersham
- Suburb
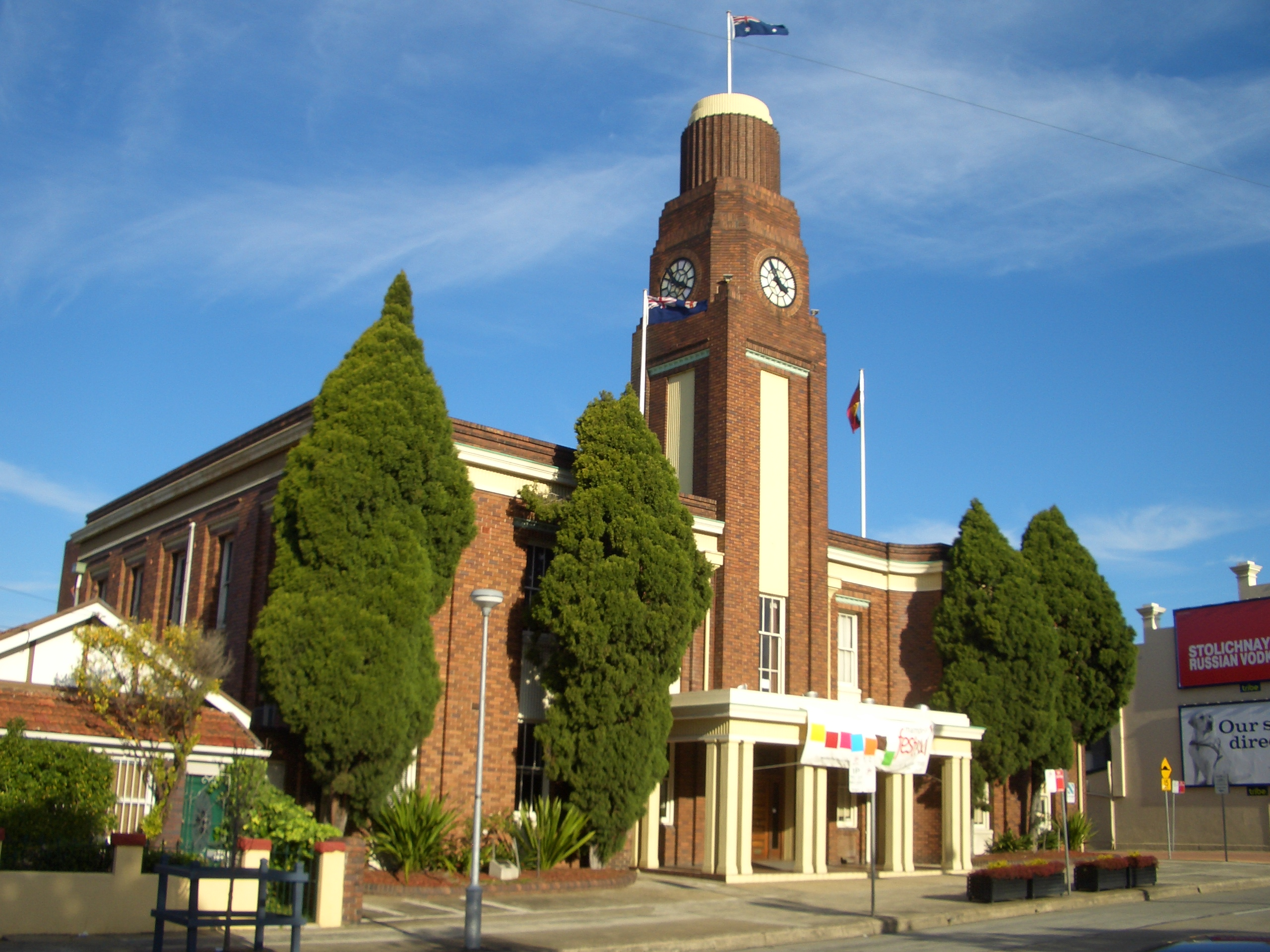
- Petersham Town Hall, Crystal Street

- Interactive map of Petersham
- Country: Australia
- State: New South Wales
- City: Sydney
- LGA: Inner West Council
- Location: 6 km (3.7 mi) south-west of Sydney CBD

Government
  - State electorate: Newtown
  - Federal division: Grayndler

Area
  - Total: 1.29 km^{2} (0.50 sq mi)
- Elevation: 37 m (121 ft)

Population
  - Total: 8,200 (2021 census)
  - Density: 6,360/km^{2} (16,460/sq mi)
- Postcode: 2049
Suburbs around Petersham
Leichhardt	Leichhardt	Annandale
Lewisham	Petersham	Stanmore
Dulwich Hill	Marrickville	Enmore

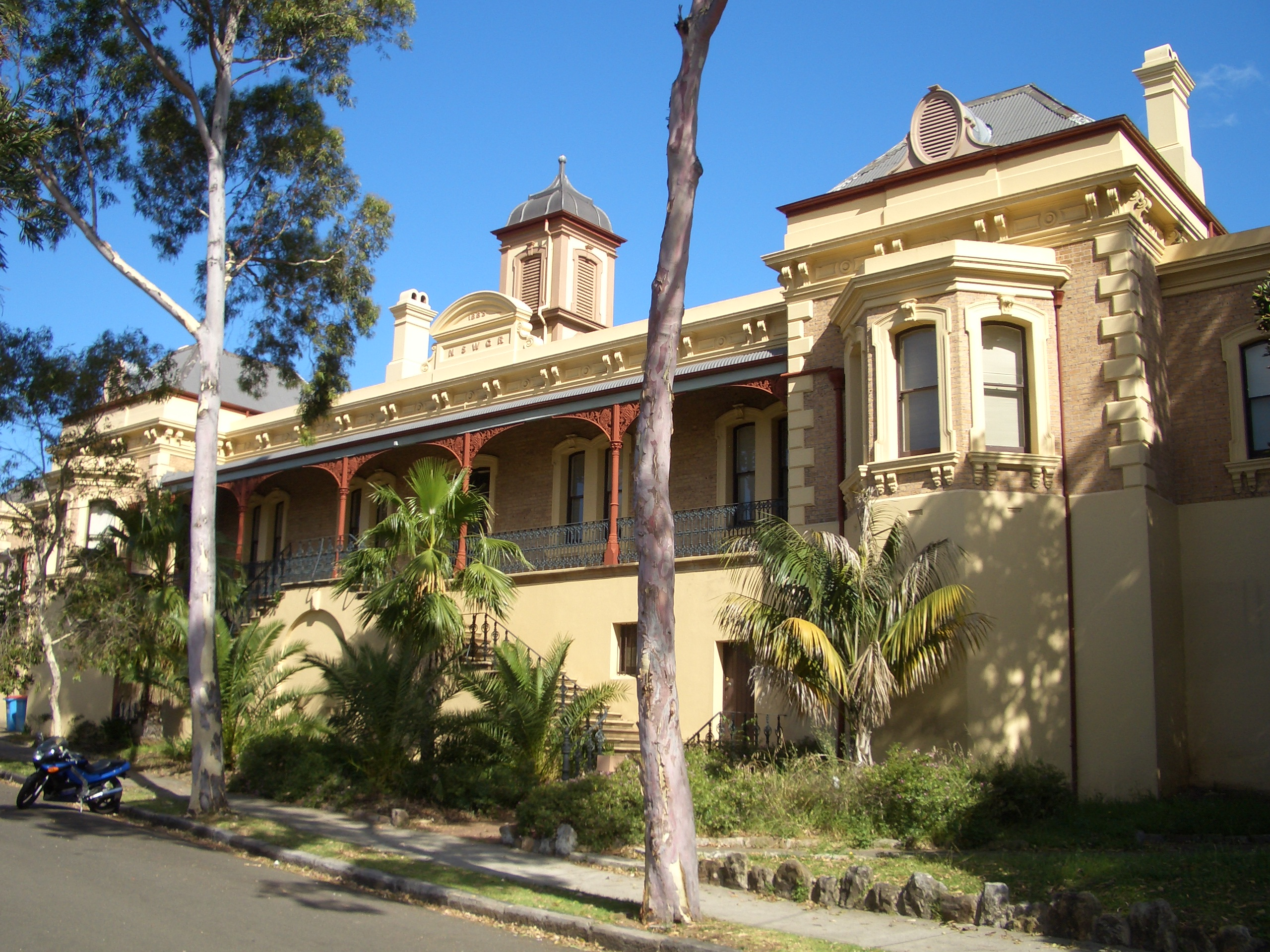
Petersham railway building

Petersham is a suburb in the Inner West of Sydney, in New South Wales, Australia. Petersham is located 6 kilometres south-west of the Sydney central business district, in the local government area of Inner West Council. Petersham is known for its extensive Portuguese businesses, with many Portuguese shops and restaurants, despite only 156 (1.9%) of the population being born in Portugal.

Petersham is bordered by the suburbs of Leichhardt to the north, Stanmore to the east, Marrickville to the south and Lewisham to the west. Taverner's Hill, named after Fred Taverner, is a locality in the western part of the suburb.

== History ==
Before British settlement, the area now constituting Petersham was within the territory of the Indigenous Gadigal people. The area now occupying Petersham was first worked by British settlers in 1793. During a period of food shortage for the new colony, the Lieutenant-Governor Major Francis Grose dispatched convicts to the suburb's south-west to clear the bush for a timber yard and to grow corn and wheat. He named the region Petersham for his native village in Surrey, England, with the name covering a broader region than today. 520 acres were granted to several, including chaplain Richard Johnson, surgeon John White and bricklayer James Bloodsworth. For some time thereafter, Petersham was used for agriculture, and was considered the source of some of the best crops in the colony. It was also a popular site for kangaroo hunting. During the 1820s, inhabitants were terrorized by bushranger Jack Donahue and his gang.

Statesman William Wentworth and his family lived in Petersham for a time. In 1831, barrister Robert Wardell acquired land from Wentworth and several others in the area, until he had all the land in Petersham and beyond, creating a 2,000 acres (8.1 km^{2}) estate that reached the Cooks River. This large estate was subdivided in 1834 upon Wardell's murder by escaped convicts. Over the following years, the area was developed. Stanmore Road was created in 1835, and within seven years had been developed from a bush track. The Cherry Tree, Petersham's first inn was opened by Thomas Weedon on land bought from Wardell's estate. During the 1840s a racetrack was opened and then closed after receiving poor attendance. At this time, travelling to Sydney with bullock (castrated cattle) took a day, and the suburb became a resting stop for travels out to Parramatta and Liverpool.

The 1850s saw developments in transport. By 1857, the first trains were stopping in Petersham on the Sydney to Parramatta line (albeit to no platform), and in 1859 the New Canterbury road was laid. A temporary platform was provided at the station after complaints, and an official structure followed in 1863. During the 1860s the area was considered quiet, hosting a small population across a broad area. Increasingly the population included workers who commuted to the city. Until the end of the century, the community continued to develop: the first post-office was built in 1855, followed by the second in 1870. Petersham municipality was incorporated in 1871, and the first public school was opened later that decade, in 1878. Upon its incorporation, the municipality had a population of 750, occupying 153 houses.

At the end of the 19th and the beginning of the 20th centuries, wealthy families moved to Petersham to get away from the crowded and dirty inner city. They chose the suburb for its parks and trainline, which gave easy access to the city. In Petersham, they built large houses, in Edwardian and Victorian architectural styles, and partook in leisurely walks and horse-riding.

On 2 May 1945 during World War II, a Mosquito HR576 RAF (UK) performing an air test flight disintegrated over Leichhardt and Petersham. The crew of two were killed but no one on the ground was seriously injured. A contemporary newspaper reported two civilian injuries and 18 properties being damaged. It was suspected that a violent pull out from a power dive, with its associated high 'G-forces may have led to the structural failure of the aircraft. The two crew members tried to escape from the aircraft but they were not high enough for their parachutes to open.

In 1948, the local council merged with Marrickville and St Peters to form the Municipality of Marrickville. During the late 20th century, Portuguese immigrants who had initially settled in Paddington moved to Petersham for cheaper accommodation. As housing prices rose later in turn, younger generations of these immigrants in turn moved to suburbs further west. During the early 21st century, the Marrickville Council engaged in a campaign to give the suburb the reputation of "Little Portugal". By 2006, Petersham had become gentrified.

== Heritage listings ==
Petersham has a number of heritage-listed sites, including:

- New Canterbury Road: Petersham Reservoir
- 23-35 New Canterbury Road: Egyptian Room, Royal Arch Masonic Temple
- Terminus Street: Petersham railway station
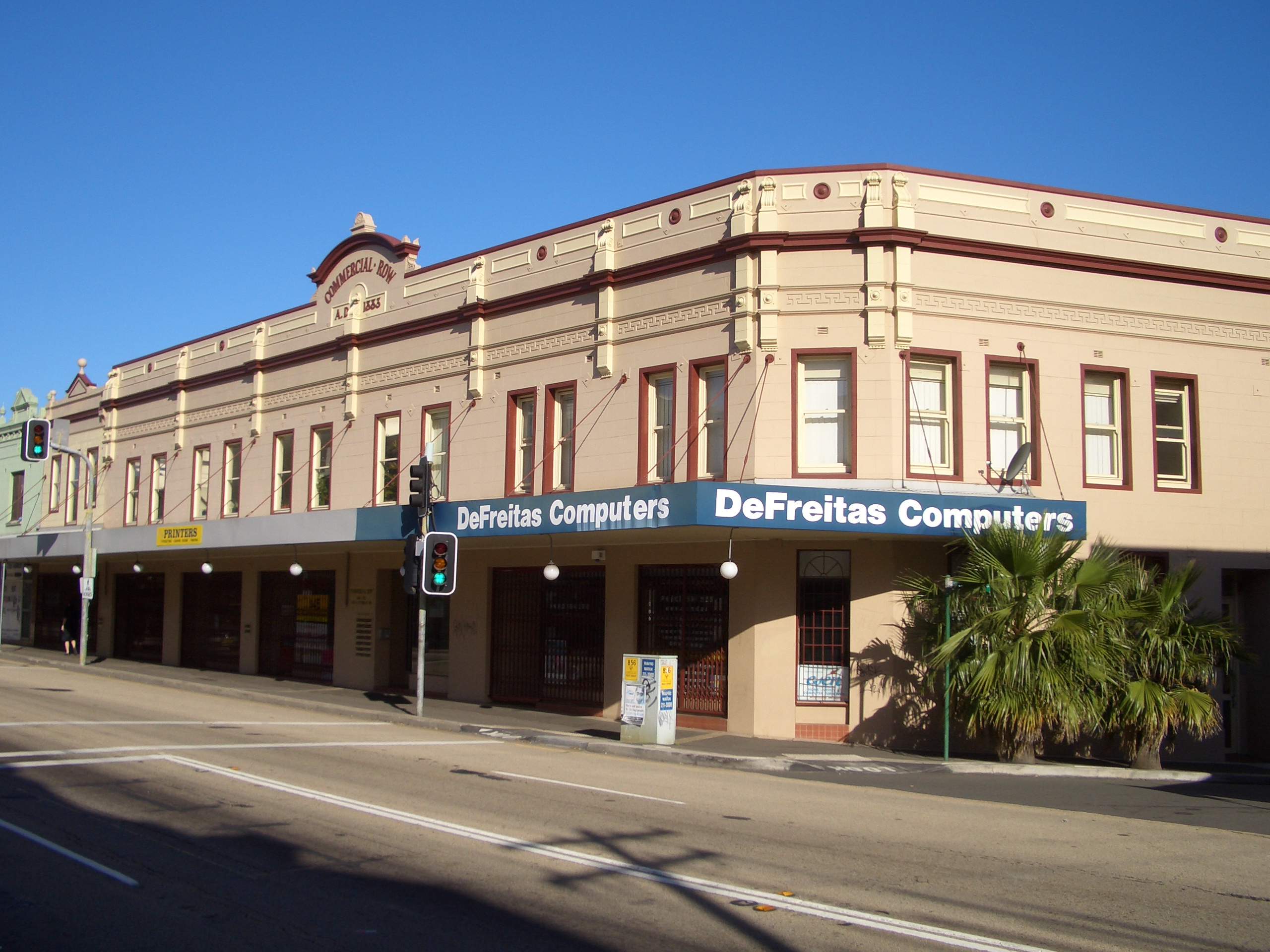
Commercial Row, New Canterbury Road

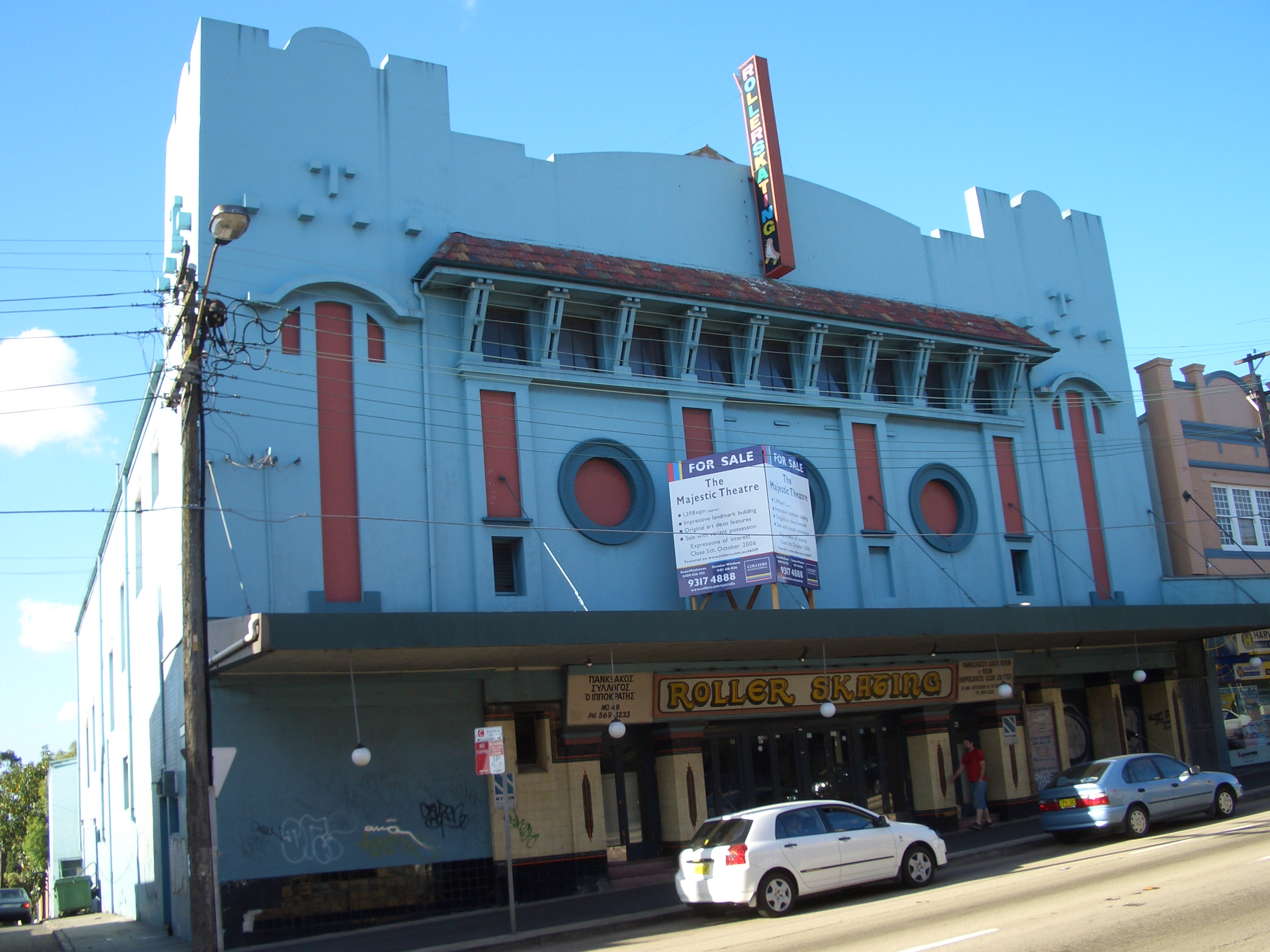
The Majestic Theatre, Petersham

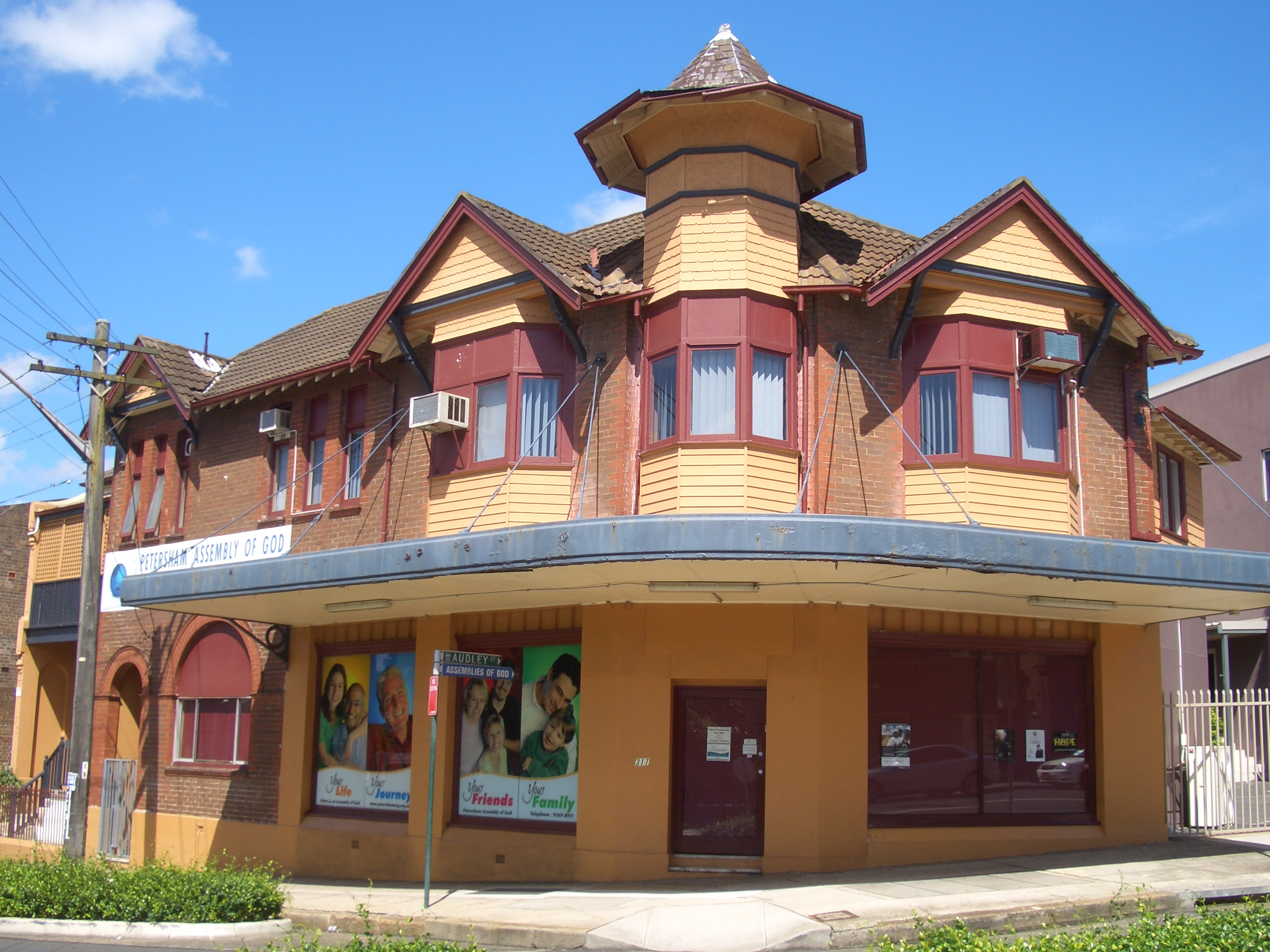
Assembly of God, Trafalgar Street

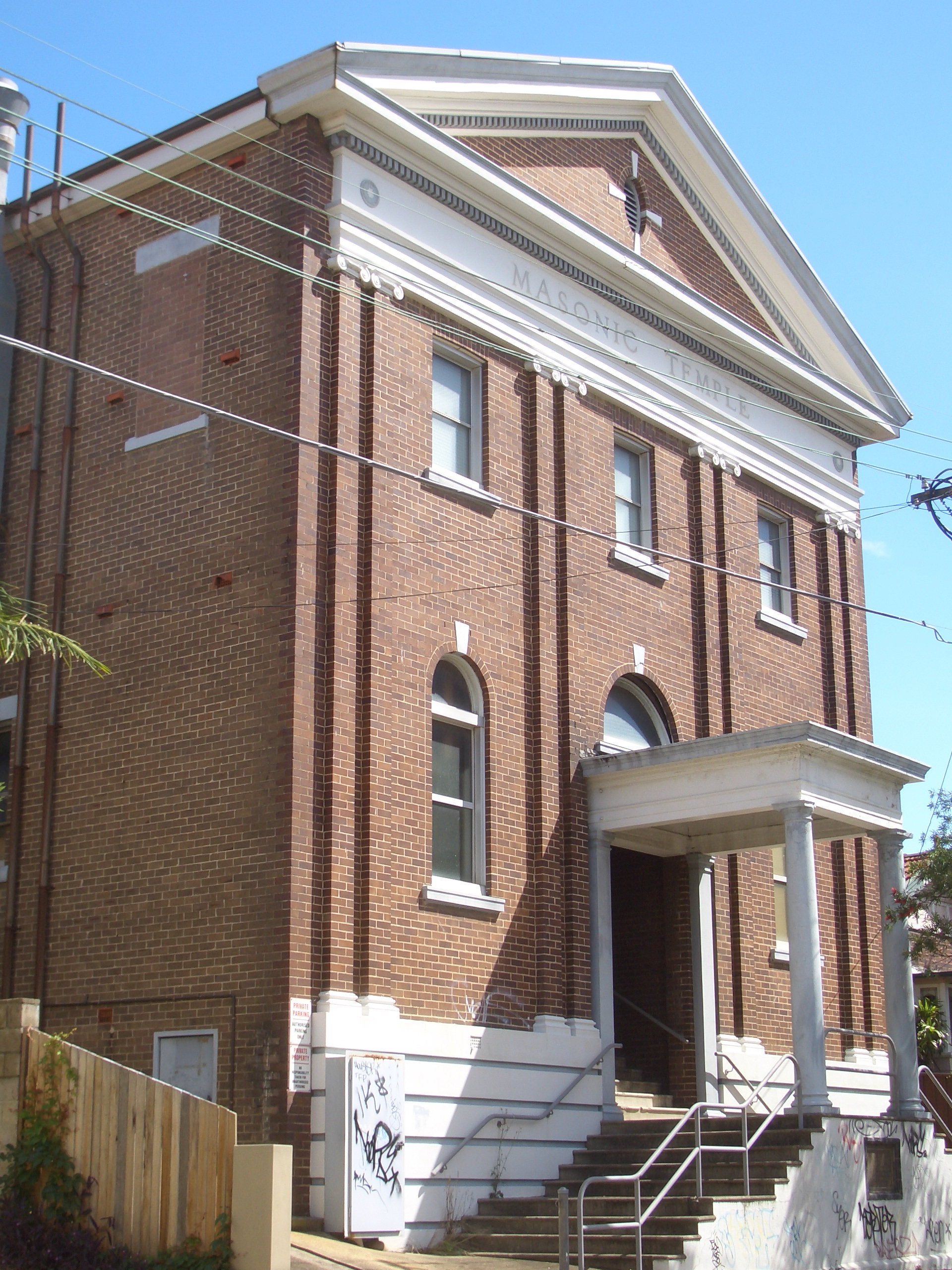
Masonic Temple

== Commercial area ==
A small row of shops and cafes line New Canterbury Road and extends down Audley Street towards the railway station. There are some Portuguese businesses here including several Portuguese restaurants, some of which are renowned for selling traditional styled flame-grilled chicken and cod dishes – Petersham is considered the heart of Sydney's Portuguese community.

Local landmarks include the Petersham Town Hall, the Petersham Reservoir and Petersham Park. Petersham is bordered by Parramatta Road to the north, as well as the training buildings for Transport for NSW railway staff.

== Transport ==
Petersham railway station is on the Leppington & Inner West Line and Liverpool & Inner West Line of the Sydney Trains network. Travelling west, all stations services run from the City Circle to Homebush and Parramatta. The station includes an ornate iron pedestrian bridge over the train line. The old station building was built in 1886 in the Victorian Free Classical style. It has been described as "the largest and grandest of the surviving 19th century railway stations in the Sydney area", and is listed on the Register of the National Estate.

The 428, 444, 445 and 412 buses run through Petersham at different points. The 428 runs from Canterbury to Circular Quay, the 444 and 445 run from Campsie to Balmain, and the 412 runs from Campsie to King Street Wharf in the city.

== Schools ==
Fort Street High School, located on Parramatta Road, is the oldest selective school in New South Wales and has 934 students as of 2013. Petersham Public School sits on the Petersham and Lewisham borders, and has 240 students as at 2014. The old public school building located in Gordon Street goes back to 1878. Along with the church in the grounds, it is listed on the Register of the National Estate. Taverners Hill Public School situated on Elswick Street, is an infants only school with 60 students and recently published its own cook book.

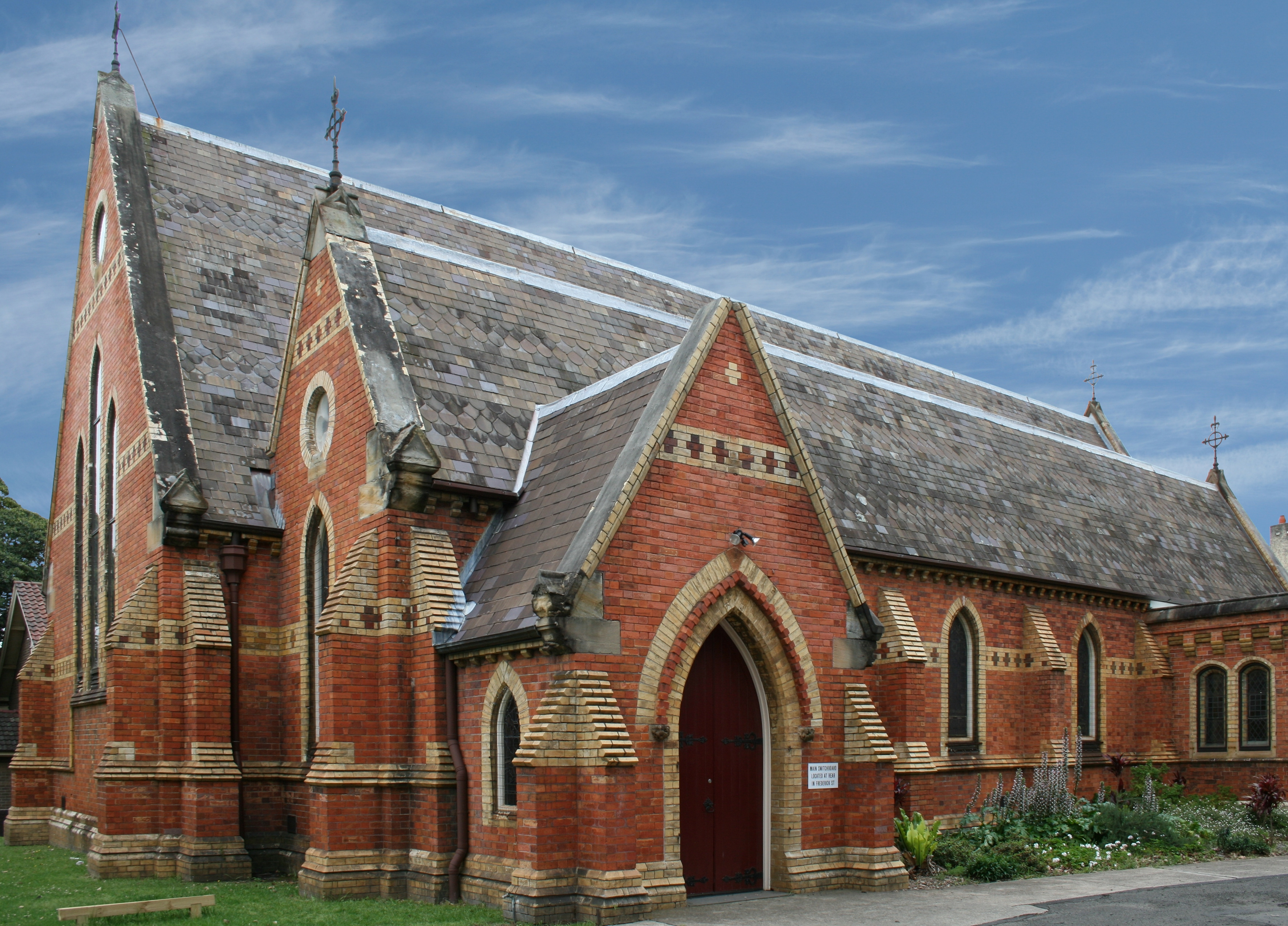
All Saints Anglican Church

== Churches ==
- All Saints Anglican Church, Petersham.
- Petersham Assembly of God, on Audley Street.
- Metropolitan Community Church, Sydney (a church with an outreach to the LGBTQI+ community but open to all).
- Thai Church: "House of Faith" at Petersham Assembly of God.
- Nova Alianca (Portuguese-speaking) at Petersham Assembly of God.

== Architecture ==
Petersham contains several Edwardian and Victorian mansions, built at the end of the 19th and beginning of the 20th centuries. These houses are generally in their original condition, unusual for a suburb so close to the city. Despite this, some have been modified with "pebblecrete" porches, and new windows, and some have been altogether demolished and replaced with apartments. The remaining mansions are concentrated around Petersham Park.

Petersham's houses are predominantly terrace houses, similar to those of Summer Hill and Stanmore on the north side of the railway station near Parramatta Road.

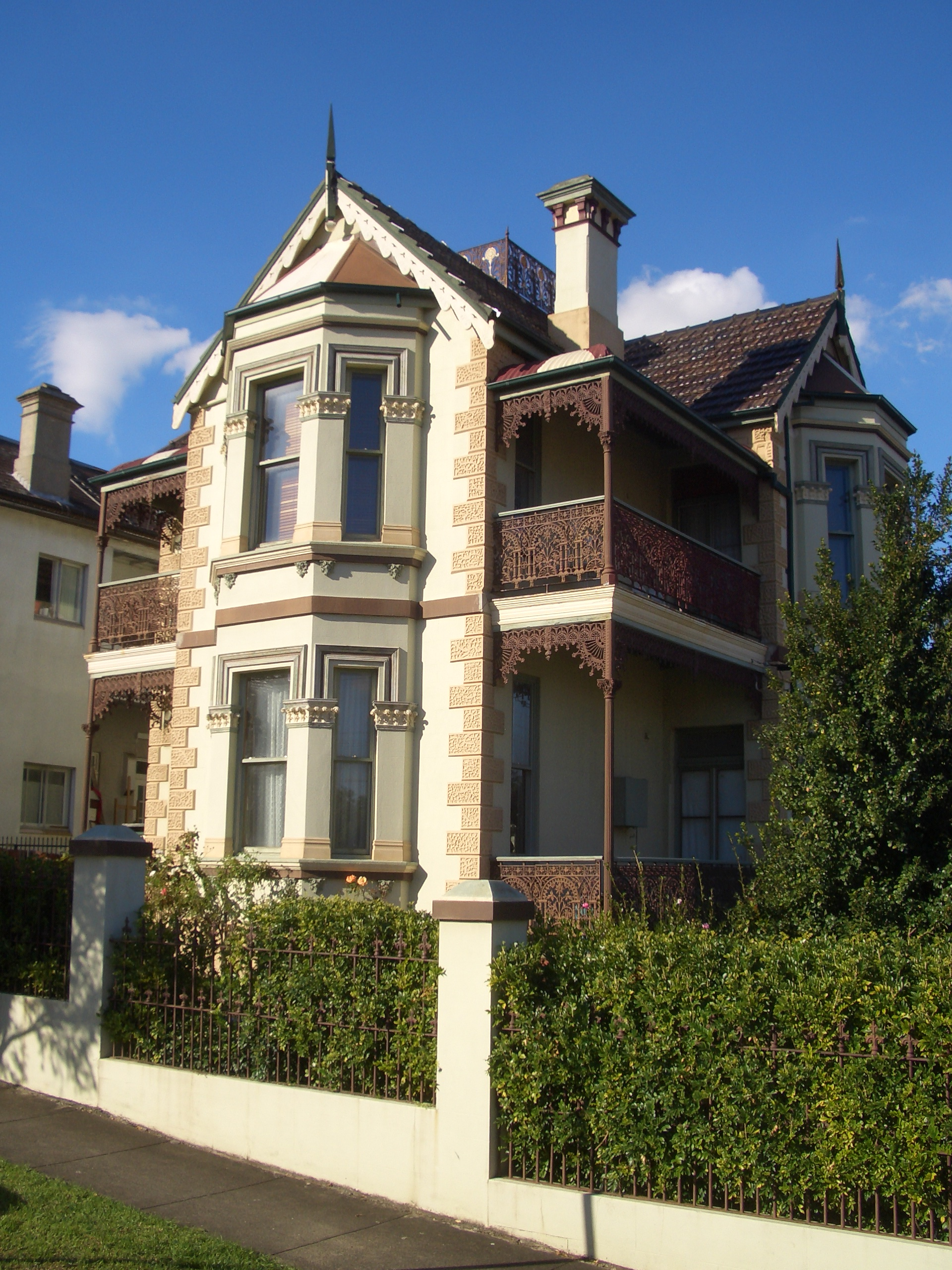
Middleton Street

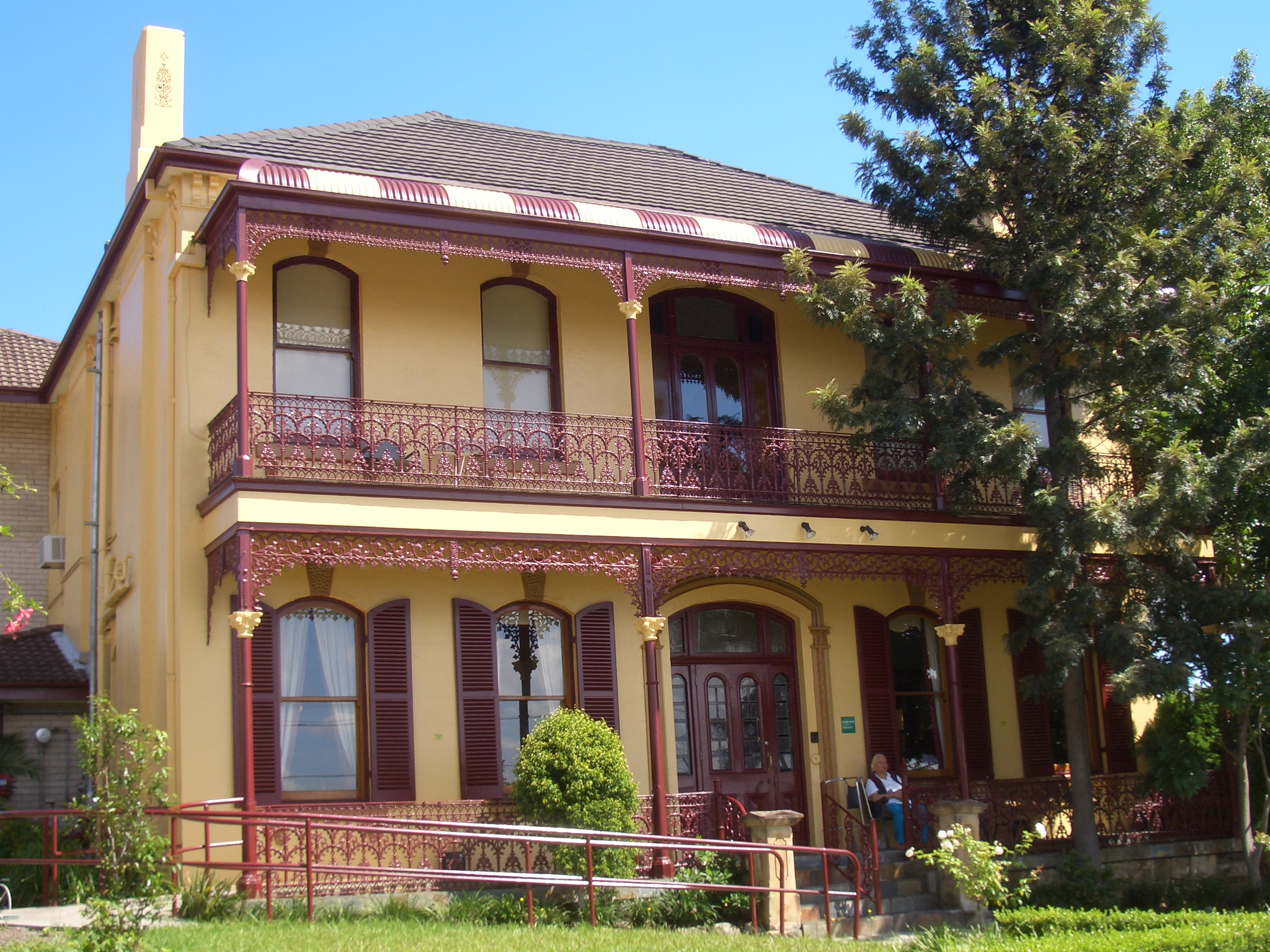
Canterbury Road

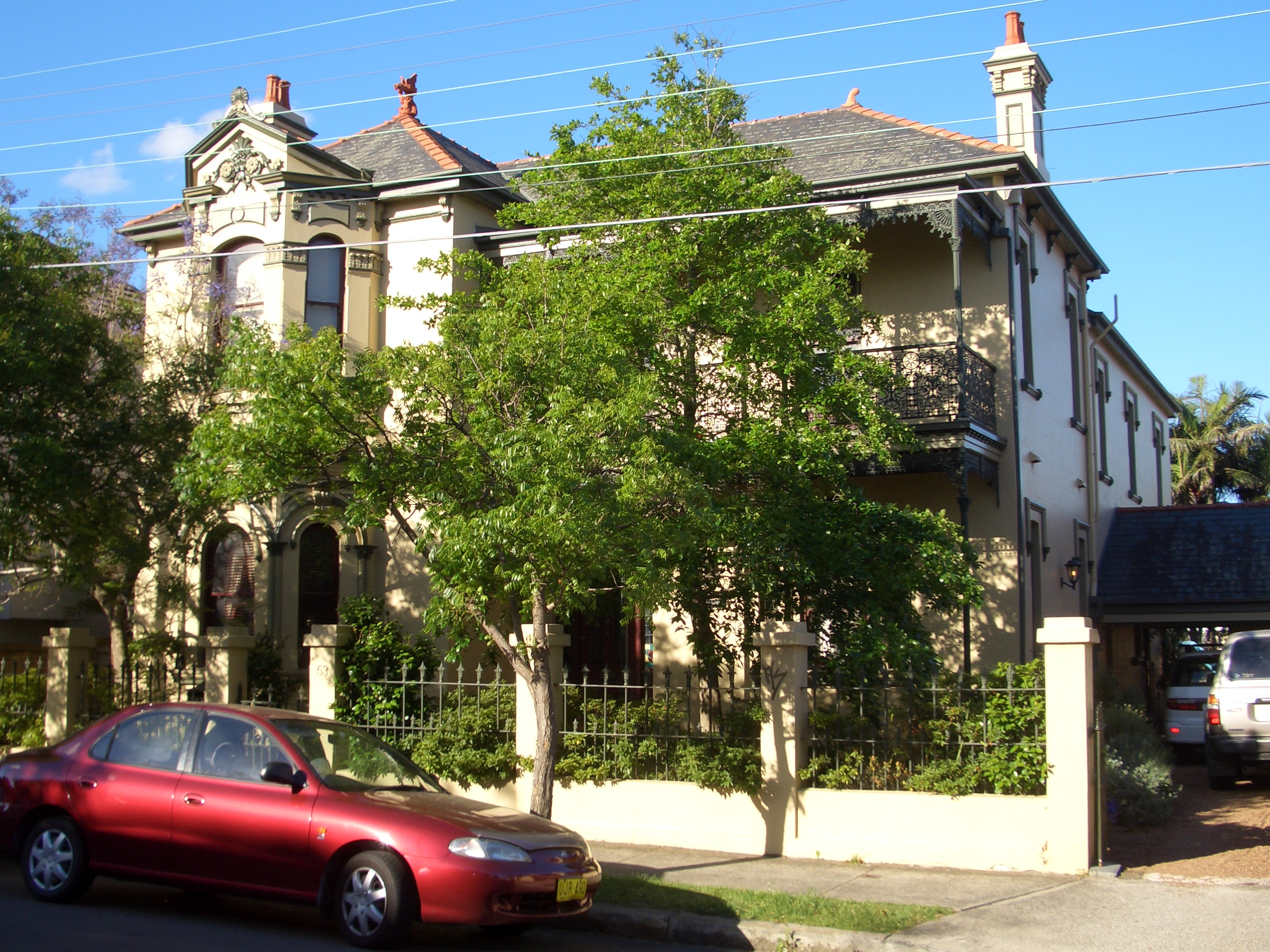
West Street

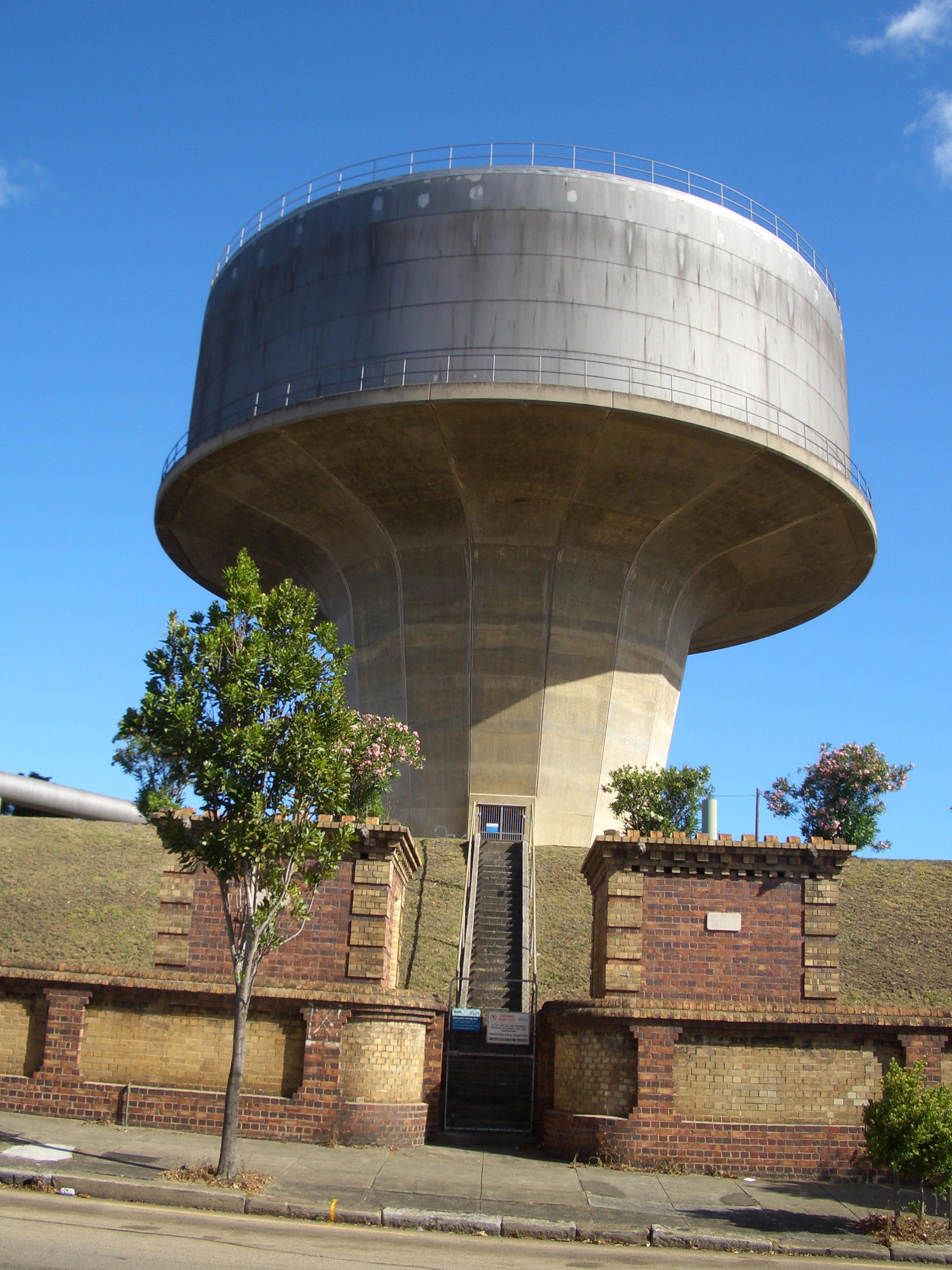
Petersham reservoir

== Demographics ==
Historical population
Year	Pop.	±%
2001	6,567	—
2006	7,391	+12.5%
2011	7,529	+1.9%
2016	8,116	+7.8%
2021	8,200	+1.0%

According to the 2021 census of Population, there were 8,200 people in Petersham.

- 67.2% of people were born in Australia. The most common countries of birth were England 4.5%, New Zealand 2.0%, Portugal 1.8%, China 1.3% and Italy 1.2%.
- 75.1% of people only spoke English at home. Other languages spoken at home included Portuguese 2.6%, Greek 2.0%, Italian 1.8%, Spanish 1.7% and Mandarin 1.6%.
- The most common responses for religion were No Religion 54.4%, Catholic 19.0%, Not stated 6.5%, Anglican 5.3% and Eastern Orthodox 3.6%.

Several families with children attending nearby private schools (such as MLC, Presbyterian Ladies' College and Trinity Grammar School) live in Petersham.

== Notable residents ==
- Milly Alcock, actress and star of Supergirl
- Keith Chisholm MC DFM (1918–1991) was born in Petersham
- Percy Hordern (1864–1926) Alderman and Mayor of Petersham Council and a member of the New South Wales Legislative Council
- Alick Kay, member of the New South Wales Legislative Assembly
- Robert Wardell, barrister and co-founder and inaugural editor of colonial-era newspaper The Australian alongside Wentworth
- William Wentworth, statesman, lived in Petersham in the 1820s

== Culture ==
Local events include the annual Audley Street festival (Bairro Português), which is a celebration of the suburb's Portuguese ties. Petersham is also home to the Petersham Bowling Club and Petersham RSL Club.
