= Paper Giants =

Paper Giants may refer to the following:

- Paper Giants: The Birth of Cleo, a 2011 Australian two part television miniseries about the beginning of Cleo magazine
- Paper Giants: Magazine Wars, a 2013 sequel miniseries
