= Dorrigo Shire =

Former local government area in New South Wales, Australia

- Local government area
- Country: Australia
- State: New South Wales
- Region: Mid North Coast
- Established: 7 March 1906
- Abolished: 1 January 1957
- Council seat: Coffs Harbour

Dorrigo Shire was a local government area in the Mid North Coast region of New South Wales, Australia.

Dorrigo Shire was proclaimed on 7 March 1906, one of 134 shires created after the passing of the Local Government (Shires) Act 1905. The shire was divided to form Nymboida Shire on 5 August 1913.

The shire offices were originally in Coramba but by 1951 had moved to Coffs Harbour. Other towns in the shire included Dorrigo, Woolgoolga and Glenreagh.

Dorrigo Shire was abolished on 1 January 1957 and split between Bellingen Shire and the newly created Coff's Harbour Shire.
