= Municipality of Petersham =

Former local government area in New South Wales, Australia

Coordinates: 33.8949°S 151.1574°E

- Local government area
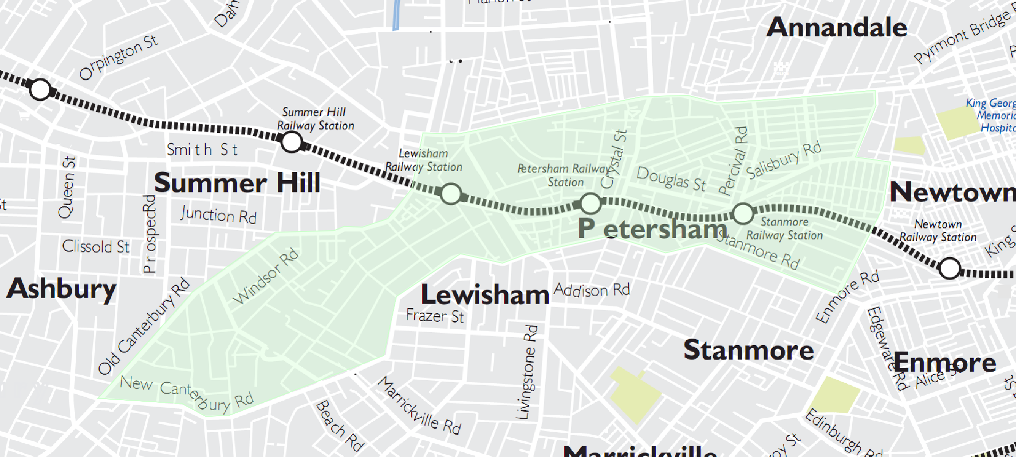
- Country: Australia
- State: New South Wales
- Region: Inner West
- Established: 14 December 1871
- Abolished: 31 December 1948
- Council seat: Petersham Town Hall

Area
  - Total: 3.5 km^{2} (1.4 sq mi)

Population
  - Total: 29,451 (1947 census)
  - Density: 8,410/km^{2} (21,790/sq mi)
- Parish: Petersham
LGAs around Municipality of Petersham
| | Leichhardt | Camperdown |
| Ashfield | Municipality of Petersham | Newtown |
| Canterbury | Marrickville |

The Municipality of Petersham was a local government area of Sydney, New South Wales, Australia. The small municipality was proclaimed as a borough in 1871 and was centred on the suburbs of Lewisham, Petersham and Stanmore. It was bounded by Parramatta Road in the north, Cardigan and Liberty Streets in the east, Stanmore and New Canterbury Roads in the south, and Old Canterbury Road in the west. The municipality was divided into three wards: South Kingston, Annadale and Sydenham, all the names of early farms. The boundaries remained fairly stable, with only minor changes on the east and western sides. The borough became a municipality in 1906. In 1949 under the Local Government (Areas) Act 1948, Petersham council was merged with the larger neighbouring Marrickville Council which was located immediately to the south.

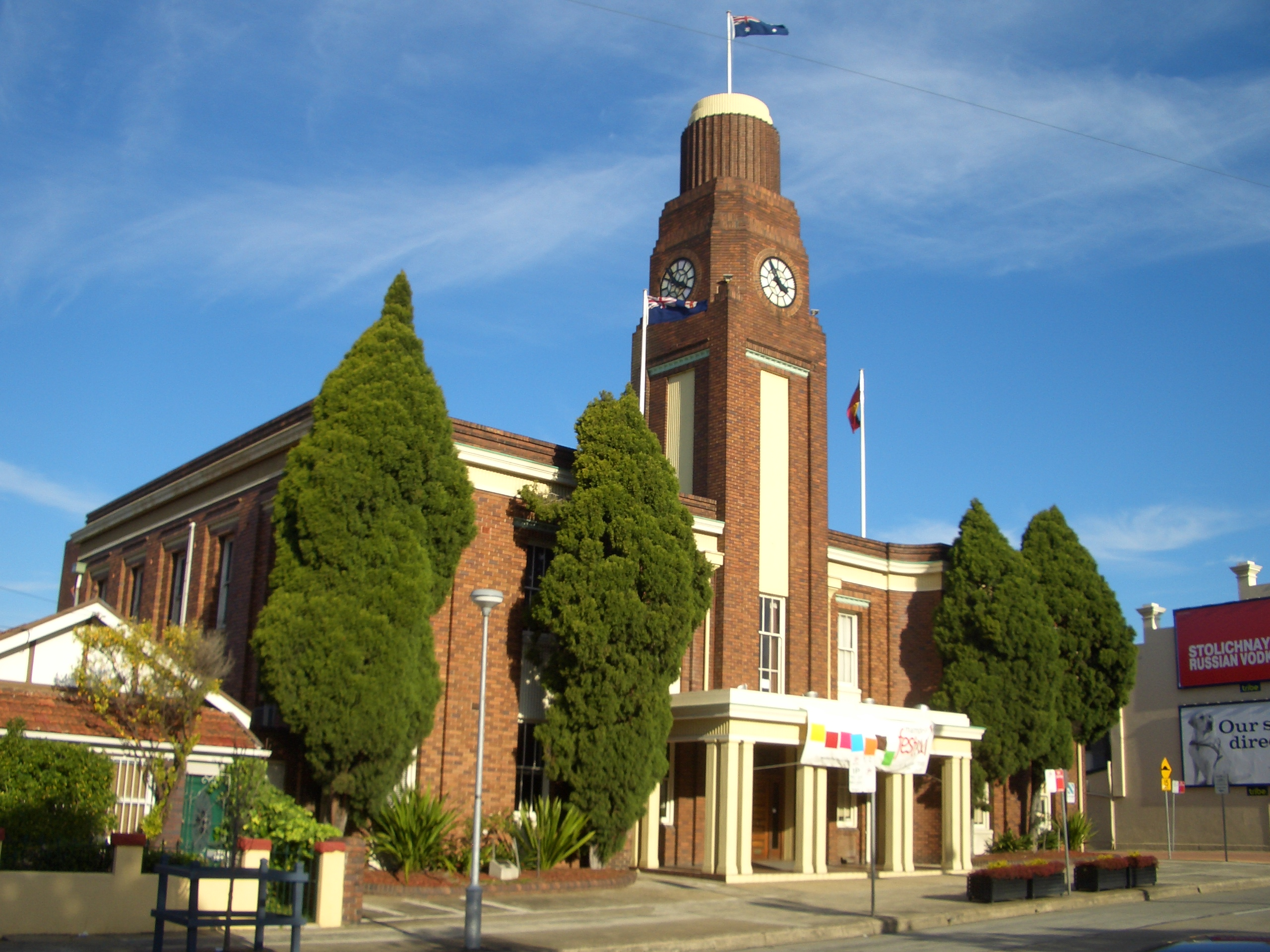
Petersham Town Hall, which replaced an earlier town hall built in 1882, was the seat of the council from 1938 to 1948.

== Mayors ==
| Mayors | Party | Term start | Term end | Notes |
|---|---|---|---|---|
| William Pigott | n/a | 14 February 1872 | 10 February 1880 | |
| Michael McMahon | n/a | 10 February 1880 | 10 February 1881 | |
| William Henry Paling | n/a | 10 February 1881 | 15 February 1882 | |
| John Gelding | n/a | 15 February 1882 | 15 February 1884 | |
| Henry Hughes | n/a | 15 February 1884 | 11 February 1885 | |
| William Davis | n/a | 11 February 1885 | 10 February 1886 | |
| John Wheeler | n/a | 10 February 1886 | 11 February 1891 | |
| Llewellyn Jones | n/a | 11 February 1891 | 13 February 1894 | |
| Alfred Rofe | n/a | 13 February 1894 | 12 February 1897 | |
| Percy Hordern | n/a | 12 February 1897 | 10 February 1899 | |
| Joseph Wetherill Cockbaine | n/a | 10 February 1899 | 15 February 1901 | |
| Henry Davis | n/a | 15 February 1901 | 9 February 1903 | |
| Percy Hordern | n/a | 9 February 1903 | 16 February 1905 | |
| Frederick Lawrence Langdon | n/a | 16 February 1905 | February 1908 | |
| Percy Hordern | n/a | February 1908 | February 1910 | |
| Tom Hoskins | n/a | February 1910 | February 1912 | |
| Richard Barry | n/a | February 1912 | 17 September 1912 | |
| John Wheeler | n/a | 20 September 1912 | 31 January 1914 | |
| Charles Henry Crammond | n/a | 3 February 1914 | 2 February 1915 | |
| Tom Hoskins | n/a | 2 February 1915 | February 1916 | |
| John Henry Albert Weekley | n/a | February 1916 | 11 February 1918 | |
| Richard Gendle | n/a | 11 February 1918 | February 1920 | |
| Abraham Cropper | n/a | February 1920 | December 1920 | |
| John Allworth Clark | n/a | December 1920 | December 1921 | |
| William John Bastion | n/a | December 1921 | 7 December 1922 | |
| David Robert Cooper | n/a | 7 December 1922 | December 1923 | |
| Joseph Johnson | n/a | December 1923 | December 1924 | |
| Walter Lawrence Maundrell | n/a | December 1924 | December 1925 | |
| John Henry Albert Weekley | n/a | December 1925 | December 1926 | |
| Gilbert Barry | n/a | December 1926 | December 1927 | |
| Arthur Whiteley | n/a | December 1927 | December 1928 | |
| Thomas Casserley | n/a | December 1928 | December 1929 | |
| James Bain | n/a | December 1929 | December 1930 | |
| Ernest Albert McKinley | n/a | December 1930 | January 1932 | |
| Arthur Whiteley | n/a | January 1932 | December 1932 | |
| Joseph Johnson | n/a | December 1932 | December 1933 | |
| Jacob Lauder Raith | n/a | December 1933 | December 1934 | |
| Walter Lawrence Maundrell | n/a | December 1934 | December 1935 | |
| John Alexander Stewart | n/a | December 1935 | December 1936 | |
| Robert John Hoskins | n/a | December 1936 | December 1937 | |
| Joseph Johnson | n/a | December 1937 | December 1938 | |
| Walter Lawrence Maundrell | n/a | December 1938 | December 1939 | |
| Fred Cahill | Labor | December 1939 | December 1940 | |
| Sydney Hastie Bain | Labor | December 1940 | December 1941 | |
| John Friel Laxton | | December 1941 | December 1943 | |
| Hilton Gregory Clifford | | December 1943 | December 1944 | |
| John Friel Laxton | | December 1944 | 31 December 1948 | |
