= 1928 New South Wales local elections =

- 1 December 1928

The 1928 New South Wales local elections were held on 1 December 1928 to elect the councils of the local government areas (LGAs) of New South Wales, Australia.

This was the first set of local elections held since the Lang Government's passing of universal adult suffrage in local government elections. Prior to this, only real estate owners were able to vote in the election for an LGA.

This was the first election for several newly-incorporated LGAs, including Willimbong Shire. Inversely, some councils did not hold elections, including the City of Sydney, which was placed under commissioner administration.
