= Daniher =

Daniher may refer to four brothers, Australian rules footballers

- Anthony Daniher (born 1963)
- Chris Daniher (born 1966)
- Neale Daniher (1961–2026)
- Terry Daniher (born 1957)

and two sons of Anthony Daniher, Australian rules footballers

- Darcy Daniher (born 1989)
- Joe Daniher (born 1994)
