= King's Birthday match =

King's (or Queen's) Birthday match may refer to

- King's Birthday match (AFL), annual Australian rules football match on the King's Birthday public holiday
- King's Birthday match (NRL), annual rugby league match held on the King's Birthday public holiday
