= Northern Riverina Football League =

Australian sports league

Northern Riverina Football Netball League
- Current season, competition or edition: 2025
- Sport: Australian rules football Netball
- Founded: May 1924; 102 years ago
- First season: 1924
- CEO: Leanne Imrie
- President: Mark Bryant
- No. of teams: 5
- Country: Australia
- Most recent champion: Tullibigeal (2026)
- Most titles: Tullibigeal (21)
- Website: northernriverinafnl.com.au

The Northern Riverina Football Netball League (NRFNL) is an Australian rules football and netball competition containing five clubs based in the northern Riverina region of New South Wales, Australia. The league features four grades in the Australian rules football competition, with these being Seniors, Under 17s, Under 14s and Under 11s. In the netball competition, there are six grades, with these being A-Grade, B-Grade, C-Grade, C-Reserve, Under 16s and Under 13s.

== History ==
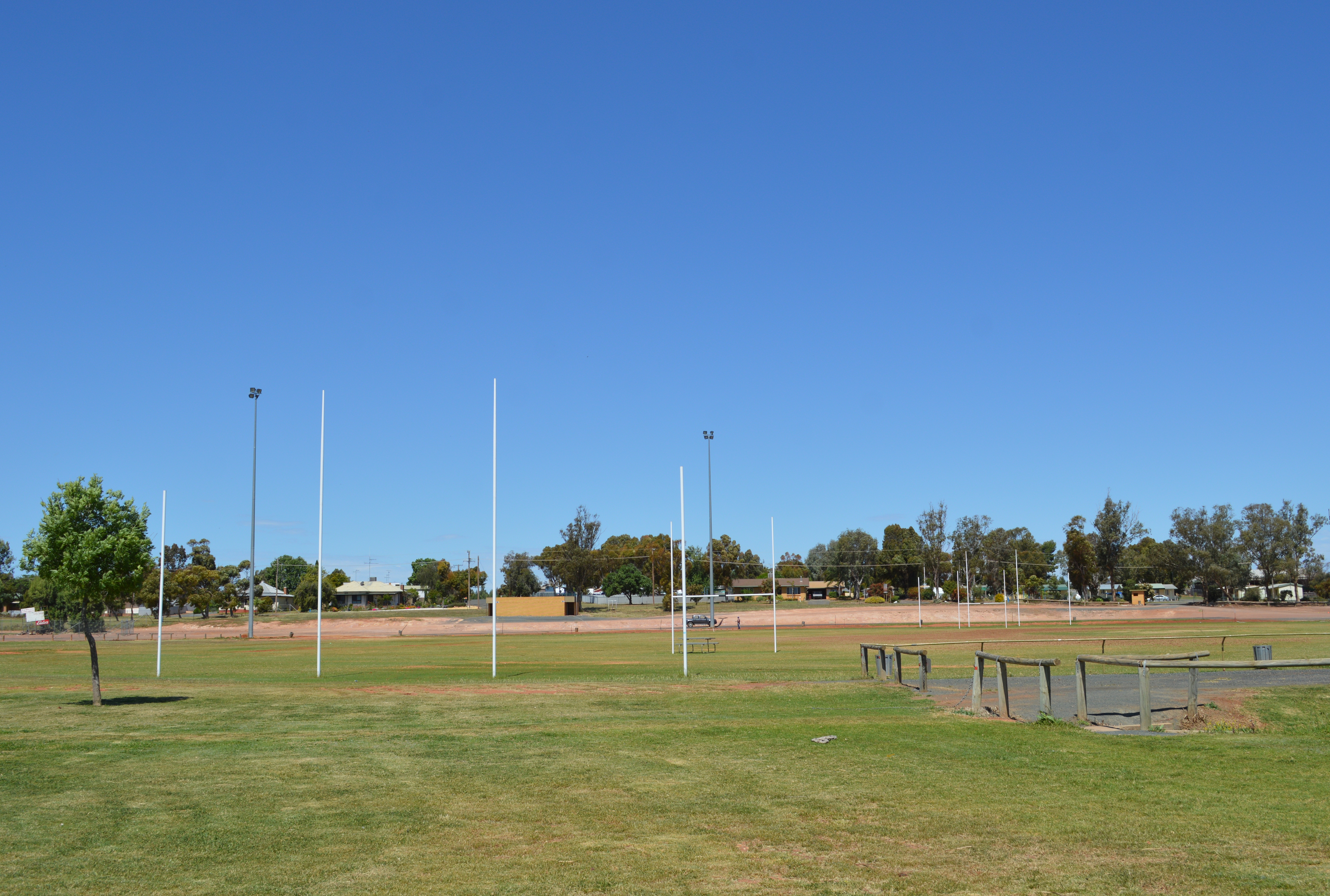
Lake Cargelligo Football Ground

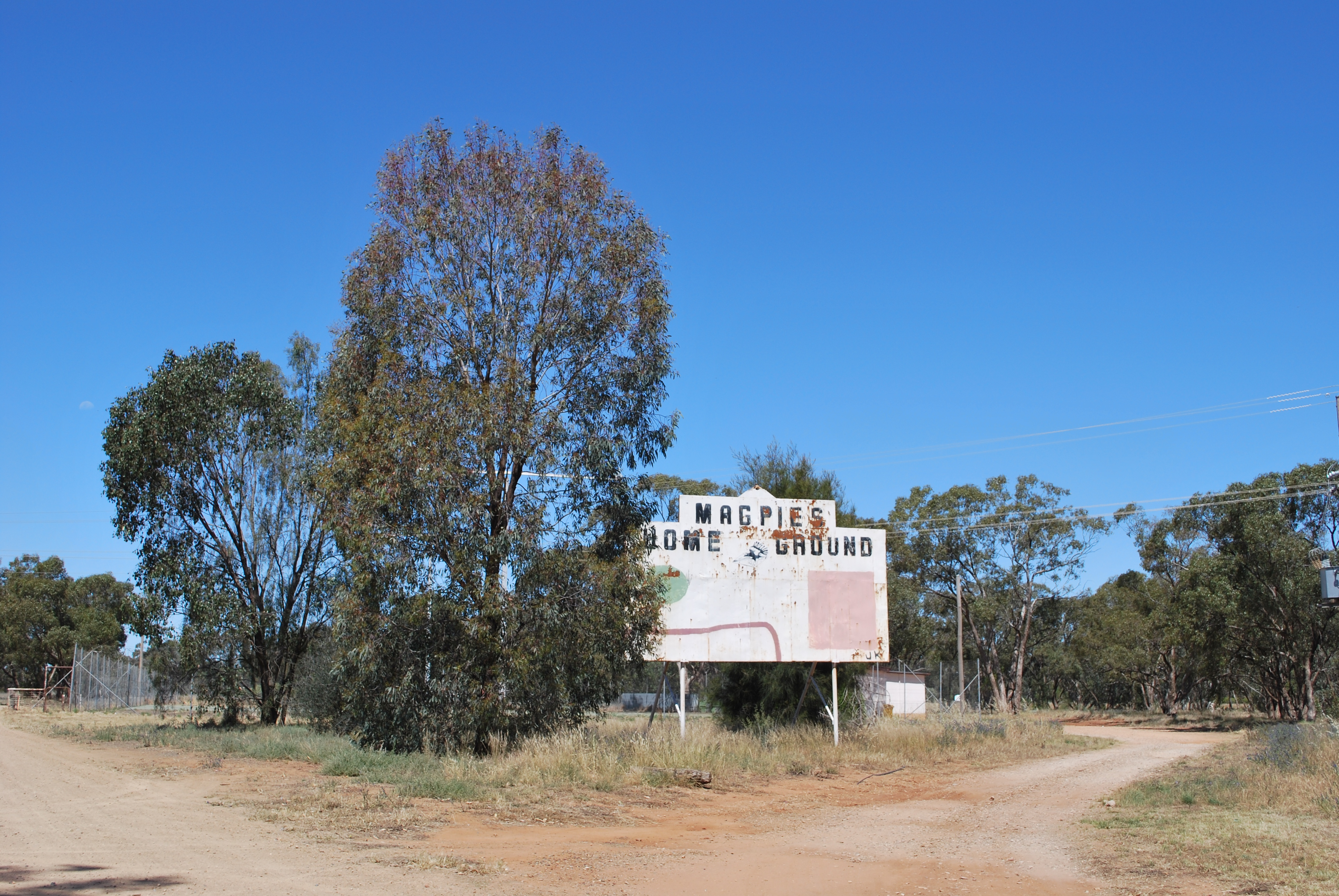
Ungarie_Football_Ground_Entry

The Northern Riverina Football League was formed in May 1924 when the Ungarie Football Association amalgamated with the Lake Cargelligo Football Association to form the Northern Riverina Australian Rules Football Association.

The five foundation club's in 1924 were – Burgooney, Girral, Lake Cargelligo Rovers, Tullibigeal and Ungarie, with Girral defeating Ungarie in the grand final.

Blow Clear entered the competition in 1925, with Tullibigeal losing only one game for the year, but were defeated by Lake Cargelligo in the grand final.

Girral and Blow Clear merged in 1926 and went on to be the premier team. Following a split in the Tullibigeal club, Four Corners was formed in 1927 and went onto be a very competitive club right up until 1994, when they folded.

Calleen joined in 1928 and Four Corners won the premiership in only their second year in the NRFA. while in 1929 Weja joined the competition, which was divided into two divisions of four teams. Four Corners and Girral finishing on top of their divisions, with Four Corners coming out on top in the grand final.

Lake Cargelligo Rovers withdrew in 1930 and the competition went back to one division, with Four Corners defeating minor premiers, Ungarie in the grand final.

Calleen and Girral both withdrew in 1932 and Yelkin entered the competition, with minor premiers, Ungarie losing to Four Corners in the grand final.

Naradhan entered the NRFA in 1933 and Tullibigeal broke through for their first premiership with an eight-point victory over Four Corners in the grand final.

Burgooney won the 1934 flag when they defeated Tullibigeal by points, then Burgooney lost the 1935 grand final when Ungarie's Les Woolsterncroft snapped a goal late in the last quarter, to defeat Burgooney by one point!

West Milby who joined in 1935 and Erigolia who joined in 1936, played off the 1936 grand final, with West Milby winning their one and only premiership. Girral withdrew form the NEFA halfway through the 1936 season.

In 1937, Lake Cargelligo re-join with a blue uniform and West Milby make the grand final from fourth position, but are defeated by Four Corners in the grand final.

Kikoira entered the NRFA in 1938 and Tullibigeal won the flag, after drawing the first semi final against West Milby. Burgooney, minor premiers in 1938, only lost one match throughout the year, then kicked 7.19 – 61 in the grand final to lose by 30 points.

Ungarie dropped out in 1939, there only season they did not field a team, with Burgooney defeating West Milby by three points in the grand final.

Kikoria won the premiership in 1940, and also won it again in 1941, after Four Corner went into recess and some of their players moved across to play with Kikoria's premiership team of 1941.

The NRFA went into recess from 1942 to 1945 due to World War II. Tullibigeal then won three consecutive premierships immediately after the war from 1946 to 1948, under the leadership of George Imrie.

In 1947, Ungarie wore a white jumper with a red sash.

In 1949, the NRFA, best and fairest player was awarded the Griffith P. Evans Cup, Griff Evans was a former West Wyalong player and official and also a local solicitor and NSW State Member for Lachlan, whose family donated the cup.

Rankins Springs and West Wyalong boosted the competition to seven teams when they joined in 1949, but Forrest Vale withdrew.

In 1950, Lake Cargelligo returned to the NRFA and Ungarie won their first premiership since 1935, led by former Forrest Vale captain, Jim Dale.

Tullibigeal had a golden era in the 1950s winning senior football premierships in 1951, 1953, 1955, 1957 and 1958 and well as three of their players winning best and fairest award, the Evans Cup in – David Imrie, Kelth Imrie and Vince Dwyer.

Footballers from the NRFL who have played in the VFL/AFL include the Daniher brothers (Terry, Neale, Anthony and Chris) and Ben Fixter, all hailing from Ungarie.

Pre 1924 Football

Australian rules football was introduced to the Northern Riverina region around in the early 1890s when farm land was being settled and with the discovery of gold at West Wyalong in 1893.

West Wyalong formed a club in 1913, consisting of two teams, the Rovers (maroon & gold) and the Globes (blue), then in 1914, a competition was held between Blow Clear, Hiawatha and West Wyalong. Ungarie was formed in 1916 and played three friendly matches against Blow Clear in their first season.

After World War I, the Bolygamy District Football Association was formed and Australian rules football was really starting to get established in the Northern Riverina area. Lake Cargelligo Rovers Football Club was formed in June 1922.

Premiers / Runners Up

- Nottle Cup
  - 1913: West Wyalong Globes: 1.4 – 10 d West Wyalong Rovers: 1.1 – 7
- Evans Cup
  - 1914: Hiawatha: 3.13 – 31 d Blow Clear: 0.4 – 4
- Football in recess due to World War I
  - 1915 to 1917
- Bolygamy District Football Association: Hodges Cup
  - 1918: Blow Clear: 5.9 – 39 d West Wyalong: 2.11 – 23 (Hodges Cup)
  - 1919: Blow Clear: 5.6 – 36 d Bolygamy: 3.7 – 25 (Hodges Cup)
  - 1920: Blow Clear: d Girral
  - 1921: Girral v Tullibigeal: F J Rath's Ungarie Hotel Cup
  - 1922: Girral Rovers: 6.3 – 39 d Tullibigeal: 4.10 – 34 (Mesdame Wallder – Farrar Cup)
- Ungarie Football Association
  - 1923: Ungarie: 35 d Blow Clear: 0.5 – 5 (J Heffernan – Girral Hotel Gold Medals)
- Lake Cargelligo District Football Association (Tom Crawford's Royal Mail Hotel Cup)
  - 1923: Lake Cargelligo Rovers: 5.4 – 34 d Tullibigeal Ramblers: 4.3 – 27

== Current clubs ==
Locations of the Northern Riverina FNL clubs.

Club	Colours	Nickname	Home Ground	Former League	Est.	Years in NRFNL	NRFNL Senior Premierships	
Club	Colours	Nickname	Home Ground	Former League	Est.	Years in NRFNL	Total	Premiership Years
Hillston		Swans	Stan Peters Oval, Hillston	–	2000	2000-	4	2007, 2019, 2023, 2024
Lake Cargelligo (Lake-Burgooney 1960-71, Lake Tigers 1980-89)		Tigers	Lake Cargelligo Recreation Ground, Lake Cargelligo	–	1960	1960-	16	1962, 1963, 1964, 1965, 1969, 1970, 1971, 1973, 1976, 2002, 2003, 2006, 2008, 2010, 2012, 2025
Tullibigeal		Grasshoppers, Paddymelons	Tullibigeal Recreation Ground, Tullibigeal	UFA	1919	1924-	21	1933, 1938, 1946, 1947, 1948, 1951, 1953, 1955, 1957, 1958, 1968, 1975, 1981, 1982, 2004, 2013, 2014, 2016, 2017, 2018, 2026
Ungarie		Magpies, Angels	Ungarie Recreation Ground, Ungarie	UFA	1916	1924-	16	1935, 1950, 1956, 1959, 1960, 1961, 1974, 1978, 1979, 1983, 1985, 1986, 1999, 2000, 2001, 2015
West Wyalong-Girral (Girral 1977-83)		Bulldogs	McAlister Oval, West Wyalong	–	1977	1977-	9	1987, 1988, 1989, 1991, 1992, 1993, 2005, 2009, 2022

== Former clubs ==
Colours	Club	Nickname	Home Ground	Former League	Est.	Years in NRFNL	NRFNL Senior Premierships		Fate
Colours	Club	Nickname	Home Ground	Former League	Est.	Years in NRFNL	Total	Premiership Years	Fate
Barellan United		Two Blues	Barellan Sportsground, Barellan	FFL	1970	1993-2015	6	1994, 1995, 1996, 1997, 1998, 2011	Returned to Farrer FL in 2015
Blow Clear				BDFA	c.1910s	1925	0	-	Merged with Girral to form Girral-Blow Clear following 1925 season
Burgooney		Tigers	Burgooney Recreation Reserve, Tullibigeal	LCFA	1923	1924-1959	2	1927, 1934	Merged with Lake Cargelligo to form Lake-Burgooney following 1959 season
Calleen (Hiawatha 1928)				–	c.1910s	1928, 1930	0	-	Recess in 1929. Folded after 1930 season
Cobar		Blues	Ward Oval, Cobar	–	1995	1995-2014	0	-	Folded after 2014 season
Condobolin-Milby (West Milby 1935-39, Milby 1940, Forrest Vale 1946-48)	(1935-48)(1953-64)(1965-2018)	Kangaroos	Condobolin Showground, Condobolin	–	1926	1926, 1935-1940, 1946-1948, 1953-1996, 1997-2003, 2015-2018	3	1966, 1967, 1990	Disbanded after Rd.1 in 1996, reformed in 1997. Recess between 1927-34, 1941-45, 1949-52 and 2004-14. Folded after 2018 season
Erigolia		All Blacks	Erigolia Recreation Ground, Erigolia	W&DFA		1936-1937	0	-	Folded after 1937 season
Four Corners		Redbreasts, Redlegs	Four Corners Football Oval, Tullibigeal	–	1927	1927-1994	13	1928, 1929, 1930, 1931, 1932, 1937, 1949, 1952, 1954, 1972, 1977, 1980, 1984	Folded after Round 1, 1994
Girral		Rovers		UFA	c.1910s	1924-1925, 1933, 1936	1	1924	Merged with Blow Clear to form Girral-Blow Clear following 1925 season. Re-formed in 1933, recess from 1934–35, folded after 1936 season
Girral-Blow Clear		Rovers		–	1926	1926-1927	1	1926	Folded after 1927 season
Kikoira		Kornstalks	Kikoira Recreation Ground, Kikoira	–	1938	1938-1942	2	1940, 1941	Did not reform after World War II.
Lake Cargelligo (1)			Lake Cargelligo Recreation Ground, Lake Cargelligo	LCFA	1920s	1924-1929, 1937-1940, 1946-1947, 1950-1955,	3	1925, 1934, 1939,	Entered recess after 1955 season, merged with Burgooney to form Lake-Burgooney (now Lake Cargelligo) in 1960
Lake Cargelligo Swans		Swans	Lake Cargelligo Golf Club Oval, Lake Cargelligo	–	1978	1978-1986	0	-	Folded after 1986 season
Naradhan	(?) Dark with white vee (1953-54)		Naradhan Recreation Ground, Naradhan	NFA	1930	1933-1936, 1948-1949, 1953-1954	0	-	Entered recess after 1936 and 1949, folded after 1954 season
Parkes		Panthers	North Parkes Oval, Parkes	CWAFL	1980	1980-1981, 1991-1996, 2005–2007	0	-	Moved to Central West AFL following 1981 season, returned there in 1997 and 2008.
Tallimba		Hawks	Tallimba Recreation Ground, Tallimba	B&DFL		1980-1986	0	-	Folded after 1986 season
Weethalle-Rankins Springs (Rankins Springs 1949-62)			Rankins Springs Recreation Ground, Rankins Springs	B&DFL	1949	1949-1951, 1961-1969	0	-	Entered recess in 1952, re-formed in Barellan & District FL in 1958. Folded after 1969 season
Weja		Wee Jugglers		–	1929	1929-1936	0	-	Folded after 1936 season
West Wyalong (1)			McAlister Oval, West Wyalong	AP&DFA	1949	1949, 1952-1956	0	-	Moved to Ariah Park & District FA after 1949 season. Folded after 1956.
Yelkin				–	1932	1932-1934	0	-	Folded after 1934 season
Yoogali		Navy Blues	Henderson Oval, Yoogali	B&DFL	1971	1972-1974	0	-	Folded after 1974 season
Young		Saints	Miller-Henry Oval, Burrangong	CRFL	1976	1978-1981	0	-	Moved to Central West AFL after 1981 season

== List of football premiers ==
=== Football ===
Senior Football Grand Final Results

Season	Grand Final Information			Minor Premiers
Season	NRFA – Premiers	Score (Margin)	NRFA – Runners-Up	Minor Premiers
1924	Girral		Ungarie
1925	Lake Cargelligo Rovers	6.13.49 – 1.4.10 (39 points)	Tullibigeal
1926	Girral-Blow Clear	60–40 (20 points)	Tullibigeal
1927	Burgooney	(7 points)	Lake Cargelligo Rovers
1928	Four Corners	98–70 (28 points)	Ungarie
1929	Four Corners		Girral-Blow Clear
1930	Four Corners	7.7.49 – 2.7.19 (30 points)	Ungarie	Ungarie
1931	Four Corners	(won by 36 points)	Burgooney
1932	Four Corners	56–23 (33 points)	Ungarie	Ungarie
1933	Tullibigeal	9.18.72 – 10.4.64 (8 points)	Four Corners	Burgooney
1934	Burgooney	10.9.69 – 3.0.18 (51 point)	Tullibigeal
1935	Ungarie	5.8.38 – 5.7.37 (1 point)	Burgooney
1936	West Milby		Erigolia
1937	Four Corners		West Milby
1938	Tullibigeal	14.7.91 – 7.19.61 (30 points)	Burgooney	Burgooney
1939	Burgooney	(won by 3 points)	West Milby
1940	Kikoira	(won by about 10 points)	Burgooney
1941	Kikoira	(won by 42 points)	Lake Cargelligo
1942–1945				NRFA in recess > World War II
1946	Tullibigeal (undefeated premiers)	6.15.51 – 6.9.45 (28 points)	Four Corners
1947	Tullibigeal (undefeated premiers)	85–52 (28 points)	Four Corners
1948	Tullibigeal		Four Corners
1949	Four Corners	9.9.63 – 8.12.60 (3 points)	Ungarie
1950	Ungarie	12.17.89 – 10.5.65 (24 points)	Tullibigeal
1951	Tullibigeal	12.13.85 – 11.11.77 (8 points)	Four Corners
1952	Four Corners	10.11 – 71 d 5.5 – 35	Ungarie
1953	Tullibigeal	10.12.72 – 5.8.38	Ungarie
1954	Four Corners	97–78 (23 points)	Ungarie
1955	Tullibigeal	11.9 – 75 d 7.7 – 49	Burgooney
1956	Ungarie	8.13 – 61 d 8.7 – 55	Burgooney
1957	Tullibigeal	13.15 – 93 d 8.4 – 52	Ungarie
1958	Tullibigeal	8.13 – 61 d 7.14 – 56	Ungarie
1959	Ungarie	14.12 – 96 d 8.13 – 61	Tullibigeal
1960	Ungarie	10.9 69 7.8 – 50	Lake-Burgooney
1961	Ungarie	9.23 – 77 d 8.9 – 57	Four Corners
1962	Lake-Burgooney	13.12 – 90 d 8.3 – 51	Milby
1963	Lake-Burgooney	9.15 – 69 d 5.11 – 41	Four Corners
1964	Northern Riverina Football League		Northern Riverina Football League
	Lake-Burgooney	10.13 – 73 d 6.13 – 49	Four Corners
1965	Lake-Burgooney	12.12 – 84 d 7.11 – 53	Four Corners
1966	Condobolin-Milby	9.20 – 74 d 5.5 – 35	Four Corners
1967	Condobolin-Milby	14.11 – 95 d 8.2 – 50	Tullibigeal
1968	Tullibigeal	11.14 – 80 d 3.9 – 27	Four Corners
1969	Lake-Burgooney	15.13 – 103 d 9.6 – 60	Four Corners
1970	Lake-Burgooney	10.12 – 72 d 4.9 – 33	Four Corners
1971	Lake-Burgooney	15.11 – 101 d 9.9 – 63	Four Corners
1972	Four Corners	6.17 – 53 d 5.2 – 32	Lake Cargelligo
1973	Lake Cargelligo	16.12 – 108 d 6.7 – 43	Ungarie
1974	Ungarie	12.7 – 79 d 6.7 – 43	Tullibigeal
1975	Tullibigeal	9.14 – 68 d 7.11 – 53	Four Corners
1976	Lake Cargelligo	13.9 – 87 d 6.16 – 52	Tullibigeal
1977	Four Corners	7.14 – 56 d 6.11 – 47	Ungarie
1978	Ungarie (undefeated premiers)	10.11 – 71 d 8.13 – 61	Four Corners
1979	Ungarie (undefeated premiers)	11/17 – 83 d 7.10 – 52	Lake Tigers
1980	Four Corners	9.19 – 73 d 9.13 – 67	Lake Tigers
1981	Tullibigeal	13.8 – 86 d 6.12 – 48	Four Corners
1982	Tullibigeal	14.2.86 – 7.18.60 (26 points)	Ungarie	Ungarie
1983	Ungarie	11.17.83 – 8.10.58 (25 points)	Four Corners	Ungarie
1984	Four Corners	13.7.85 – 7.13.55 (30 points)	Ungarie	Ungarie
1985	Ungarie (undefeated premiers)	14.14.98 – 11.6.72 (26 points)	Tullibigeal	Ungarie
1986	Ungarie (undefeated premiers)	17.12.114 – 9.10.64 (50 points)	Tullibigeal	Ungarie
1987	West Wyalong-Girral	18.11.119 – 11.10.76 (43 points)	Four Corners	West Wyalong-Girral
1988	West Wyalong-Girral	13.8.86 – 13.5.83 (3 points)	Tullibigeal	Four Corners
1989	West Wyalong-Girral	16.15.111 – 11.14.80 (31 points)	Condobolin-Milby	Condobolin-Milby
1990	Condobolin-Milby	21.18.144 – 14.13.97 (47 points)	Ungarie	Ungarie
1991	West Wyalong-Girral	14.8.92 – 9.10.64 (28 points)	Lake Cargelligo	West Wyalong-Girral
1992	West Wyalong-Girral	14.9.93 – 11.7.73 (20 points)	Parkes	Parkes
1993	West Wyalong-Girral	22.11.143 – 7.6.48 (95 points)	Tullibigeal	West Wyalong-Girral
1994	Barellan United	19.18.132 – 8.12.60 (72 points)	Ungarie	Barellan United
1995	Barellan United	16.7.103 – 10.15.75 (28 points)	Ungarie	Ungarie
1996	Barellan United	13.8.86 – 10.8.68 (18 points)	West Wyalong-Girral	Barellan United
1997	Barellan United	9.7.61 – 7.11.53 (8 points)	West Wyalong-Girral	Barellan United
1998	Barellan United	13.7.85 – 12.8.60 (25 points)	Ungarie	Barellan United
1999	Ungarie	25.13.163 – 9.7.61 (102 points)	Barellan United	Ungarie
2000	Ungarie	15.11.101 – 10.4.64 (37 points)	Barellan United	Ungarie
2001	Ungarie	17.14.116 – 4.6.30 (86 points)	Barellan United	Lake Cargelligo
2002	Lake Cargelligo	14.10.94 – 8.10.58 (36 points)	Condobolin-Milby	Lake Cargelligo
2003	Lake Cargelligo	15.11.101 – 13.17.95 (6 points)	Ungarie	Lake Cargelligo
2004	Tullibigeal	16.8.104 – 10.7.67 (37 points)	Lake Cargelligo	Tullibigeal
2005	West Wyalong-Girral	12.13.85 – 9.14.68 (17 points)	Barellan United	West Wyalong-Girral
2006	Lake Cargelligo	15.9.99 – 11.14.80 (19 points)	Barellan United	Barellan United
2007	Hillston	24.12.156 – 9.14.68 (88 points)	Lake Cargelligo	Hillston
2008	Lake Cargelligo	13.18.96 – 10.12.72 (24 points)	Hillston	Tullibigeal
2009	West Wyalong-Girral	16.10.106 – 10.9.69 (37 points)	Lake Cargelligo	West Wyalong-Girral
2010	Lake Cargelligo	16.21.117 – 7.5.47 (70 points)	Hillston	Lake Cargelligo
2011	Barellan United	11.7.73 – 9.15.69 (4 points)	Lake Cargelligo	Barellan United
2012	Lake Cargelligo	13.12.90 – 9.13.67 (23 points)	West Wyalong-Girral	Lake Cargelligo
2013	Tullibigeal (undefeated premiers)	15.13.103 – 7.9.51 (52 points)	Barellan United	Tullibigeal
2014	Tullibigeal (undefeated premiers)	13.9.87 – 6.6.42 (45 points)	Lake Cargelligo	Tullibigeal
2015	Ungarie	14.8.92 – 12.13.85 (7 points)	Lake Cargelligo	Lake Cargelligo
2016	Tullibigeal	13.9.87 – 9.4.58 (29 points)	Lake Cargelligo	Lake Cargelligo
2017	Tullibigeal	11.9.75 – 9.12.66 (9 points)	Lake Cargelligo	Tullibigeal
2018	Tullibigeal (undefeated premiers)	15.5.95 – 9.14.68 (27 points)	Lake Cargelligo	Tullibigeal
2019	Hillston	13.11.89 – 12.14.86 (3 points)	Tullibigeal	Tullibigeal
2020				NRFL in recess due to COVID-19.
2021	Lake Cargelligo (won 2nd Semi Final)		Hillston (won Preliminary Final)	Lake Cargelligo. No grand final played due to COVID-19.
2022	West Wyalong-Girral	14.12.96 d 10.14.74 (22 points)	Hillston	West Wyalong-Girral
2023	Hillston	12.18 (90) d 9.7 (61) (29 points)	Tullibigeal	Hillston
2024	Hillston	16.11 (107) d 13.11 (89) (18 points)	Tullibigeal	Hillston
2025	Lake Cargelligo	15.12 (102) d 11.9 (75) (27 points)	Hillston	Hillston

==== Under 16's ====
- 1959: Tullibigeal d Ungarie
- 1960:
- 1961:
- 1962:
- 1963: Tullibigeal d Murrin Bridge
- 1964: Ungarie d Tullibigeal
- 1965: Lake Burgooney
- 1966: Lake Burgooney d Tullibigeal
- 1967: Condo – Milby d Tullibigeal
- 1968: Tullibigeal d Ungarie
- 1969: Ungarie d Tullibigeal
- 1970: Ungarie d Tullibigeal
- 1971: Ungarie d Tullibigeal
- 1972: Ungarie d Tullibigeal
- 1973: Ungarie d Tullibigeal
- 1974: Ungarie d Tullibigeal
- 1975: Ungarie d Tullibigeal
- 1976: Ungarie d Tullibigeal
- 1977: Ungarie d Tullibigeal

==== Under 17's ====
- 1978: Ungarie d Condo Milby
- 1979: Condobolin-Milby d Ungarie
- 1980: Lake Cargelligo d Condo – Milby
- 1981: Ungarie d Tullibigeal
- 1982: Ungarie – Tallimba
- 1983: Condobolin-Milby d Ungarie
- 1984: Condobolin-Milby d Ungarie
- 1985: Tullibigeal d Ungarie
- 1986: Ungarie d Lake Tigers
- 1987: Ungarie d Condo Milby
- 1988: Lake Cargelligo Tigers d Girral West Wyalong
- 1989: Lake Cargelligo Tigers d Girral West Wyalong
- 1990: Ungarie d Girral West Wyalong
- 1991: Ungarie d Red Bend
- 1992: Ungarie d Tullibigeal
- 1993: Lake Cargelligo d Tullibigeal
- 1994: Lake Cargelligo d Ungarie
- 1995: Ungarie d Lake Cargelligo
- 1996: Ungarie d Lake Cargelligo
- 1997: Lake Cargelligo d Girral West Wyalong
- 1998: Lake Cargelligo d Girral West Wyalong
- 1999: Lake Cargelligo d Tullibigeal
- 2000: Tullibigeal d Girral West Wyalong
- 2001: Tullibigeal d Lake Cargelligo
- 2002: Tullibigeal d Girral West Wyalong
- 2003: Tullibigeal d Girral West Wyalong
- 2004: West Wyalong-Girral d Lake Cargelligo
- 2005: Parkes d West Wyalong-Girral
- 2006: West Wyalong-Girral d Hillston
- 2007: West Wyalong-Girral d Lake Cargelligo
- 2008: West Wyalong-Girral d Ungarie
- 2009: Ungarie d West Wyalong-Girral
- 2010: Lake Cargelligo d West Wyalong-Girral
- 2011: Lake Cargelligo d Ungarie
- 2012: West Wyalong-Girral d Lake Cargelligo
- 2013: Lake Cargelligo: 16.14 – 110 d West Wyalong-Girral: 7.8 – 50
- 2014: Lake Cargelligo: 11.8 – 74 d West Wyalong-Girral: 7.6 – 48
- 2015: West Wyalong-Girral: 18.10 – 118 d Lake Cargelligo: 6.5 – 41
- 2016: Lake Cargelligo: 13.6 – 84 d West Wyalong-Girral: 4.5 – 29
- 2017: Lake Cargelligo: 16.10 – 106 d West Wyalong-Girral: 6.4 – 40
- 2018: West Wyalong-Girral: 13.13 – 91 d Ungarie: 3.3 – 21
- 2019: West Wyalong-Girral: 18.15 – 123 d Ungarie: 4.7 – 31
- 2020: NRFNL in recess > COVID-19
- 2021: Tullibigeal v Hillston (no grand final played > COVID-19)
- 2022: West Wyalong-Girral: 14.21 – 105 d Ungarie: 4.6 – 30
- 2023: Ungarie: 11.9 – 75 d West Wyalong-Girral: 5.4 – 34
- 2024: Ungarie: 15.9 – 99 d Lake Cargelligo: 12.11 – 83
- 2025: Ungarie: 8.2 – 50 d Lake Cargelligo: 5.11 – 41

==== Under 12's ====
- 1981: Ungarie d Lake Tigers
- The Under 12's competition became an U/13's competition in 1982.

==== Under 14's ====
- 1982: Ungarie
- 1983: Ungarie
- 1984: Condobolin-Milby
- 1985: Lake Cargelligo
- 1986: Lake Cargelligo
- 1987: Ungarie
- 1988: Ungarie
- 1989: Condobolin-Milby
- 1990: Lake Cargelligo
- 1991: Lake Cargelligo
- 1992: Ungarie
- 1993: Lake Cargelligo
- 1994: Ungarie
- 1995: Tullibigeal
- 1996: Tullibigeal
- 1997: Tullibigeal
- 1998: Tullibigeal
- 1999: Tullibigeal
- 2000: West Wyalong-Girral
- 2001: Ungarie
- 2002: West Wyalong-Girral
- 2003: West Wyalong-Girral
- 2004: Lake Cargelligo
- 2005: West Wyalong-Girral
- 2006: Ungarie
- 2007: Barellan United
- 2008: Barellan United
- 2009: Lake Cargelligo
- 2010: Tullibigeal
- 2011: Ungarie
- 2012: Lake Cargelligo:
- 2013: Tullibigeal: 9.12 – 66 d Lake Cargelligo: 6.7 – 43
- 2014: Barellan United: 3.4 – 22 d Hillston: 1.3 – 9
- 2015: West Wyalong-Girral: 7.11 – 53 d Ungarie: 2.4 – 16
- 2016: Ungarie: 4.7 – 31 d Lake Cargelligo: 4.6 – 30
- 2017: West Wyalong-Girral: 8.14 – 62 d Ungarie: 1.3 – 9
- 2018: Tullibigeal: 7.5 – 47 d Lake Cargelligo: 4.7 – 31
- 2019: West Wyalong-Girral: 10.13 – 73 d Hillston: 1.0 – 6
- 2020: NRFNL in recess > COVID-19
- 2021: Ungarie v Lake Cargelligo (No grand final played > COVID-19)
- 2022: West Wyalong-Girral: 14.7 – 91 d Ungarie: 3.5 – 23
- 2023: Lake Cargelligo: 5.5 – 35 d Ungarie: 4.4 – 28
- 2024: Ungarie: 10.8 – 68 d Lake Cargelligo: 4.14 – 38
- 2025: West Wyalong-Girral: 9.7 – 61 d Lake Cargelligo: 8.6 – 54

==== Under 11's ====
- 2002: Ungarie d Girral West Wyalong
- 2003: West Wyalong-Girral
- 2004: Barellan United
- 2005: Barellan United
- 2006: Barellan United
- 2007: Lake Cargelligo
- 2008: Barellan United
- 2009: Ungarie
- 2010: Lake Cargelligo
- 2011: Lake Cargelligo
- 2012: West Wyalong-Girral
- 2013: Hillston: 9.6 – 60 d West Wyalong-Girral: 2.5 – 17
- 2014: West Wyalong-Girral: 6.2 – 38 d Hillston: 3.7 – 25
- 2015: Hillston: 3.8 – 26 d West Wyalong-Girral: 3.4 – 22
- 2016: Ungarie: 3.4 – 22 d West Wyalong-Girral: 3.3 – 21
- 2017: Ungarie: 6.3 – 39 d West Wyalong-Girral: 2.9 – 21
- 2018: Lake Cargelligo: 7.7 – 49 d Ungarie: 4.2 – 26
- 2019: West Wyalong-Girral: 9.4 – 58 d Lake Cargelligo: 2.2 – 14
- 2020: NRFNL in recess > COVID-19
- 2021: Lake Cargelligo v West Wyalong-Girral (no grand final played > COVID-19)
- 2022: Lake Cargelligo: 5.3 – 33 d Hillston: 2.3 – 15
- 2023: Hillston: 7.10 – 52 d Lake Cargelligo: 2.1 – 13
- 2024: Hillston: 9.20 -74 d Lake Cargelligo: 2.4 – 16
- 2025: Hillston: 5.9 -39 d Lake Cargelligo: 2.2 – 14

== Netball Premiers ==
The NRNL – A. Grade competition commenced in 1981, with the Under 16's commencing in 1982, which was then dissolved in 1985. In 1984/85 the Under 13's started playing socially, then competitively. B. Grade commenced in 1988 and the Under 10's commenced in 1993. C Grade commenced in 2008, while in 2012 the Under 16's and Under 13's replaced the Under 14's and Under 12's competitions.

=== A-Grade ===
1981 to present day

- 1981: Lake Tigers
- 1982: Tullibigeal
- 1983: Lake Tigers
- 1984: Lake Swans
- 1985: Tullibigeal
- 1986: West Wyalong-Girral
- 1987: Lake Cargelligo
- 1988: Lake Tigers
- 1989: Lake Tigers
- 1990: Lake Tigers
- 1991: Condo – Milby
- 1992: Condo – Milby
- 1993: Ungarie
- 1994: Barellan United
- 1995: Barellan United
- 1996: Barellan United
- 1997: Ungarie
- 1998: Ungarie
- 1999: Ungarie
- 2000: Ungarie
- 2001: Ungarie
- 2002: Lake Cargelligo
- 2003: Barellan United
- 2004: Tullibigeal
- 2005: Ungarie
- 2006: Ungarie
- 2007: Ungarie
- 2008: Ungarie
- 2009: Ungarie
- 2010: West Wyalong-Girral
- 2011: Barellan United
- 2012: West Wyalong-Girral
- 2013: Ungarie
- 2014: Ungarie
- 2015: West Wyalong-Girral
- 2016: Tullibigeal: 65 d West Wyalong Girral: 63
- 2017: Tullibigeal d West Wyalong Girral
- 2018: West Wyalong-Girral
- 2019: Tullibigeal: 51 d Hillston: 48
- 2020: NRFNL in recess > COVID-19
- 2021: Tullibigeal v West Wyalong Girral (no G Final played > COVID-19)
- 2022: Hillston: 58 d West Wyalong-Girral: 38
- 2023:

=== B-Grade ===
1987 to present day

- 1987: Condo-Milby/Ungarie
- 1988: Lake Tigers
- 1989: Lake Tigers
- 1990: Lake Tigers
- 1991: Lake Tigers
- 1992: Four Corners
- 1993: Lake Cargelligo
- 1994: Tullibigeal
- 1995: Ungarie
- 1996: Barellan United
- 1997: Tullibigeal
- 1998: Barellan United
- 1999: Lake Cargelligo
- 2000: Ungarie
- 2001: Lake Cargelligo
- 2002: Barellan United
- 2003: Lake Cargelligo
- 2004: Barellan United
- 2005: Lake Cargelligo
- 2006: Barellan United
- 2007: Barellan United
- 2008: Lake Cargelligo
- 2009: Cobar
- 2010: West Wyalong-Girral
- 2011: Barellan United
- 2012: West Wyalong-Girral
- 2013: Barellan United
- 2014: West Wyalong-Girral
- 2015: Lake Cargelligo
- 2016: Tullibigeal: 47 d West Wyalong Girral: 41
- 2017: Ungarie d Hillston
- 2018: Lake Cargelligo
- 2019: West Wyalong Girral: 41 d Lake Cargelligo: 27
- 2020: NRFNL in recess > COVID-19
- 2021: Ungarie v Lake Cargelligo (no G Final played > COVID-19)
- 2022: Lake Cargelligo: 59 d Hillston: 34
- 2023:

=== C-Grade ===
2008 to present day

- 2008: Lake Cargelligo
- 2009: West Wyalong-Girral
- 2010: Lake Cargelligo
- 2011: Hillston
- 2012: Lake Cargelligo
- 2013: Tullibigeal
- 2014: West Wyalong-Girral
- 2015: Hillston
- 2016: Lake Cargelligo: 52 d Condo Milby: 39
- 2017: West Wyalong Girral d Tullibigeal
- 2018: Tullibigeal
- 2019: West Wyalong Girral: 58 d Hillston: 35
- 2020: NRFNL in recess > COVID-19
- 2021: Lake Cargelligo v West Wyalong Girral (no G Final played > COVID-19)
- 2022: Ungarie: 49 d Hillston: 33
- 2023:

=== C-Reserve Grade ===
2018 to present day

- 2018: West Wyalong Girral
- 2019: West Wyalong Girral: 40 d Tullibigeal: 31
- 2020: NRFNL in recess > COVID-19
- 2021: West Wyalong Girral v Ungarie (no G Final played > COVID-19)
- 2022: West Wyalong Girral: 61 d Ungarie: 49
- 2023:

=== Under 16s ===
Under 16 – 2012 to present day

- 2012: Lake Cargelligo
- 2013: Tullibigeal
- 2014:
- 2015:
- 2016: Lake Cargelligo: 43 d Condo Milby: 37
- 2017: Condo-Milby V Tullibigeal
- 2018:
- 2019: Ungarie: 54 d Lake Cargelligo: 41
- 2020: NRFNL in recess > COVID-19
- 2021: West Wyalong Girral v Hillston (no G Final played > COVID-19)
- 2022: West Wyalong Girral: 47 d Lake Cargelligo: 33
- 2023:

=== Under 14s ===
U/14's – ? to 2011

- 1998: Ungarie
- 1999: Barellan United
- 2000: Barellan United
- 2001: West Wyalong-Girral
- 2002: Lake Cargelligo
- 2003: West Wyalong-Girral
- 2004: Barellan United
- 2005: Lake Cargelligo
- 2006: Lake Cargelligo
- 2007: Lake Cargelligo
- 2008: West Wyalong-Girral
- 2009: West Wyalong-Girral
- 2010: Lake Cargelligo
- 2011: Lake Cargelligo

=== Under 13s ===
U/13's – 1985 to ? then, 2012 to present day

- 2012: Tullibigeal
- 2013: Lake Cargelligo
- 2014:
- 2015:
- 2016: Lake Cargelligo 32 def Unagire 30
- 2017: Ungarie V West Wyalong Girral
- 2018:
- 2019: Hillston: 41 d Lake Cargelligo: 40
- 2020: NRFNL in recess > COVID-19
- 2021: Ungarie v Tullibigeal (no G Final played > COVID-19)
- 2022: Ungarie: 50 d Tullibigeal: 30
- 2023:

=== Under 12s ===
U/12's – ? to 2011

- 2004: Lake Cargelligo
- 2005: Lake Cargelligo
- 2006: West Wyalong-Girral
- 2007: West Wyalong-Girral
- 2008: West Wyalong-Girral
- 2009: Lake Cargelligo\
- 2010: West Wyalong-Girral
- 2011: Tullibigeal

=== Under 10's ===
1993 to ?

- 1993:
- 1994:

== League Best & Fairest Winners ==
Senior Football
Griffith P. Evans Cup

First awarded in 1949. Now awarded the Evans Medal.

Year	Winner	Club	Votes	Runner up	Club	Votes
	Northern Riverina FA					
1949	Jim Daniher	Ungarie		John Delahunty	Burgooney	
1950	Dave Imbrie	Tullibigeal				
1951	Leo Daniher	Ungarie				
1952	No Award	Votes misplaced in 1952				
1953	Keith Imrie	Tullibigeal				
1954	Vince Dwyer &	Tullibigeal				
	John Morris	Naradhan				
1955	Ray Davis	Milby				
1956	Jim Daniher	Ungarie		Dud Ireland	Four Corners	
1957	Cliff McCrum	Four Corners				
1958	Jim Cullen	Ungarie		Vince Dwyer	Tullibigeal	
				Viv Koop	Ungarie	
1959	Jim Daniher	Ungarie				
1960	Norm Frankel	Four Corners				
1961	Keith Willis	Milby				
1962	Roger Thom	Lake Burgooney				
1963	Ron Nancarrow	Weethalle – Rankin Springs			Four Corners	
1964	Northern Riverina FL					
	Ron Nancarrow	Weethalle – Rankins Springs	17	Norm Frankel	Four Corners	13
1965	Barry Glasgow	Four Corners		Neil Noll	Condo – Milby	
1966	Barry Glasgow	Four Corners	23	Neil Noll	Condo – Milby	15
1967	Harry Sanson	Lake Burgooney	24	Vic Hathaway	Weethalle – Rankins Springs	19
1968	Col Groch	Condo-Milby	20	Ross Sanson	Lake Burgooney	18
1969	Richard Devlin &	Condo – Milby				
	Roger Thom	Lake Burgooney				
1970	Bob Sanson	Lake Burgooney	15	Richard Devlin	Condo – Milby	14
1971	Noel Hasse	Tullibigeal	9	Jim Blacker	Lake Burgooney	8
1972	Terry Ireland	Four Corners	29	Bruce Noll	Condo – Milby	18
1973	Terry Ireland	Four Corners	17	Trevor Henley	Ungarie	13
1974	Terry Ireland &	Four Corners	22	Noel Haase	Tullibigeal	15
	Terry Daniher	Ungarie	22			
1975	Noel Hasse	Tullibigeal	25	Terry Ireland	Four Corners	18
1976	Geoff Hanns	Condo – Milby	13	Ian Fyfe	Tullibigeal	11
1977	Lindsay Henley	Ungarie	21	Peter McFadyen	Lake Cargelligo	19
	Terry Ireland*	Four Corners	21			
1978	Terry Ireland	Four Corners	17	Geoff Hanns	Four Corners	14
1979	Peter McFadyen	Lake Cargelligo	19	Keith Rees	Girral	14
				Peter Rooney	Girral	14
1980	Terry Ireland	Four Corners	20	Col Neyland	Girral	18
1981	Gary Koop	Ungarie	18	Col Neyland	Girral	13
1982	Lindsay Henley	Ungarie	14	Colin Dunn	Girral	13
				Terry Fyfe	Tullibigeal	13
				Phil Hague	Four Corners	13
1983	Phillip Poulsen	Ungarie	15	Phil Hague	Four Corners	14
1984	Col Dunn	Girral West Wyalong	14	Gary Koop	Ungarie	12
				Neil Hart	Lake Swans	12
				Col Ward	Tullibigeal	13
1985	Gary Koop	Ungarie	23	Peter McFadyen	Lake Tigers	16
				Col Ward	Tullibigeal	16
1986	John Parnaby	Condo – Milby	23	Barry Beetson	Lake Swans	14
				Jim Prentice	Girral West Wyalong	14
				Shaun Quade	Tallimba	16
1987	Colin Ward	Tullibigeal	24	Mark Daniher	Girral West Wyalong	13
1988	Chris Frankel	Four Corners	14	Mark Daniher	Girral West Wyalong	12
1989	Pat Daniher	Girral West Wyalong	16	Peter McFadyen	Four Corners	15
1990	Malcom Williams	Ungarie	22	Craig Colman	Ungarie	13
				John Parnaby	Tallimba	13
1991	Owen Brown	Lake Cargelligo	18	Peter Daunt	Four Corners	16
1992	Malcom Williams	Ungarie	17	Chris Marlands	Lake Cargelligo	14
1993	Shaun Townsend	Lake Cargelligo	19	Tim Byrne &	Parkes	18
				Mark Daniher	Girral West Wyalong	18
1994	Shane Till	Barellan	20	Glen Carroll	Parkes	16
1995	Kim Block	West Wyalong – Girral	16	Jamie Broadbent	Tullibigeal	15
				Michael Smith	Barellan	15
1996	Gerald Simpson &	Barellan	15	Anton Noble	Girral Wesy Wyalong	14
	Justin Male	Barellan	15			
1997	Peter King	Ungarie	17	Jamie Broadbent	Tullibigeal	15
1999	Peter King	Ungarie	24	Wayne Bodycott	Barellan	19
1999	Jamie Grintell	Ungarie	26	Peter Wilson	Ungarie	14
2000	Chris Daniher	Ungarie	28	Steve Henley	Ungarie	14
2001	Chris Daniher	Ungarie	18	Wade Fullham	Condo – Milby	16
2002	Jamie Broadbent	Tullibigeal	23	Gary Argus	Hillston	22
2003	Chris Daniher	Ungarie	24	Ryan McClintock	Ungarie	10
2004	Chris Daniher	Ungarie	21	Shane Davis	Tullibigeal	16
2005	Hamish Townsend	Lake Cargelligo	18	Jamie Grintell	West Wyalong Girral	17
2006	Brendan Murphy	Hillston	21	Tim Byrne	Parkes	14
				Rod Lemon	West Wyalong	14
2007	Brendan Murphy	Hillston	20	Dan Bendall	Tullibigeal	19
2008	Kaine Malone	Barellan	18	Billy May	Hillston	15
2009	Matt Smith	West Wyalong Girral	18	Josh Ward	Ungarie	14
2010	Josh Smith	Lake Cargelligo	15	Jesse Hampton	West Wyalong Girral	13
				Billy May	Hillston	13
2011	Brenton Brown	Tullibigeal	29	Aaron Hart	Lake Cargelligo	16
				Connor Neyland	Ungarie	16
2012	Ed Wilson	Lake Cargelligo	21	Sonny Bartholomew	Tullibigeal	16
2013	Dean Fair	Tullibigeal	22	Lachlan Rowling	Ungarie	13
2014	Sonny Bartholomew	Tullibigeal	27	Aaron Hart	Lake Cargelligo	21
2015	Aaron Hart	Lake Cargelligo				
2016	Sonny Bartholomew	Tullibigeal				
2017	Kieran Fair	Tullibigeal	34	Mitchell Stubberfield	Tullibigeal	13
2018	Aaron Hart	Lake Cargelligo	20	Sonney Bartholomew	Tullibigeal	18
2019	Tyrone Johnstone	Lake Cargelligo	16	Joshua Smith	Hillston	15
2020	in recess:COVID-19					
2021	Will McMartin	West Wyalong – Girral	20	Bryce McPherson	Lake Cargelligo	19
2022	Bryce McPherson	Lake Cargelligo	24	Will McMartin	West Wyalong – Girral	17

- 1977: Terry Ireland lost on a countback

Junior Football – Best & Fairest Winners

Year	Under 17's	Club	Under 14's	Club	Under 11's	Club
2014	Steven Hart	Lake Cargelligo	Cody Collins	Lake Cargelligo	Tom Roscarel	Ungarie
2019	Cody Collins	Lake Cargelligo	Jack Crofts	Ungarie	Nickolas Cooper	West Wyalong Girral
2020	In recess COVID-19					
2021	Jack Crofts	Ungarie	Lewis Henley	Ungarie	Locky Thopre	Lake Cargelligo

Netball Best & Fairest Winners List

- A. Grade: 1981 to present day
- B. Grade: 1987 to present day
- C. Grade: 2008 to present day
- C. Reserve: 2018 to present day

Year	A. Grade	Club	B. Grade	Club	C. Grade	Club	C. Reserve	Club
1981	Leeanne Henley	Ungarie						
1982	Leanne Riddel	Condo Milby						
1983	Tanya Thorton	Condo Milby						
1984	Cherie Honeysett	Condo Milby						
1985	Chris Turner	Lake Swans						
1986	Diane Hart	Lake Swans						
1987	Diane Hart	Four Corners	Helen Tyack	Tullibigeal				
1988	Sue Sutherland	Lake Tigers	Pam Archibald &	Ungarie				
			Kristy Chatterton	Lake Tigers				
1989	Linda Hague	Four Corners	Marie Fyfe	Tullibigeal				
	Tracy Schulz	Ungarie						
	Cherie Sealey	Condo Milby						
1990	Monique Merrett	Condo Milby	Louise Loftus	Tullibigeal				
1991	Cheryl Spence	Four Corners	Rachel Thomas	Four Corners				
1992	Lee Benson	Lake Tigers	Danielle Meyer	Lake Tigers				
1993	Kerry Johnson	Lake Tigers	Kristen Ireland &	Four Corners				
			Tanya Ireland	Four Corners				
1994	Kathy Bourchier &	Barellan	Michelle Byrne	Parkes				
	K Evans	Barellan						
1995	Kathy Bourchier	Barellan	Josie Thorpe	Lake Tigers				
1996	Jada Bendall	Tullibigeal	Erin Bandy &	Barellan				
			Paige Male	Barellan				
1997	Kathryn Henley &	Ungarie	Sandi Smith	Barellan				
	Robyn Overs	Barellan						
1998	Kathy Bourchier	Barellan	D Johnson	Lake Tigers				
1999	Kathryn Henley	Ungarie	Diane Conlan	Barellan				
2000	Angela Orr	Lake Tigers	Megan Henley &	Condo Milby				
			Kim Rowling	Ungarie				
2001	Lee Alexander	Lake Tigers	Carly Whytcross	Barellan				
2002	Lisa Benson	Lake Tigers	Crystal Fyfe	Tullibigeal				
2003	Jodie Landy	Barellan	Diane Conlan	Barellan				
2004	Nicole Turner	Lake Tigers	Renee Archibald &	Ungarie				
			Danae Lamont	Barellan				
2005	Megan Johnson	Lake Tigers	Renee Morris	Lake Tigers				
2006	Melanie Jamieson &	Barellan	Allison Jardine	Hillston				
	Kelly May	Tullibigeal						
2007	Angela Blampied &	Ungarie	Rebecca Collins	West Wyalong Girral				
	Talisha Brown	Lake						
2008	Kathryn Henley	Ungarie	Michelle Catterson	Tullibigeal	Sue Lesker	Lake Tigers		
2009	Kathryn Currey	Ungarie	Danae Conlan	Barellan	Kathy Bourchier &	Barellan		
					Toni May	Hillston		
2010	Lee Alexander	Lake	Renee Morris	Lake Tigers	Holy Iverach	West Wyalong Girral		
2011	Jackie Ross	Ungarie	Bonnie Quade &	Barellan	Michelle Sarkis	Hillston		
			Sandy Jolly	Barellan				
2012	Joanna Brown	West Wyalong Girral	Danae Conlan	Barellan	Nicole Ring	Lake Tigers		
2013	Maggie Payne	Ungarie	Megan Henley	Tullibigeal	Nikki Gilbert	Cobar		
2014	Erin Bonetti	Barellan	Nicole O'Neill &	Lake Tigers	Jessica Black	West Wyalong Girral		
			Lacey Pettit	West Wyalong Girral				
2015	Leilani Bell	Tullibigeal	Jessica Black &	West Wyalong Girral	Ashlin Imrie	Lake Tigers		
			Kelly Tyack	Tullibigeal				
2016	Leilani Bell	Tullibigeal	Kelly Tyack	Tullibigeal	Nataya Kennedy	Hillston		
2017	Jackie Ross	Ungarie	Hannah Tong	Hillston	Sarah Black	West Wyalong Girral		
2018	Lee Alexander	Lake	Brooke Maslin	West Wyalong Girral	Brittany Fair	Tullibigeal	Hannah Pettit	West Wyalong – Girral
2019	Shayna Bell	Tullibigeal	Eloise Ryan	West Wyalong Girral	Samatha Tough	West Wyalong Girral	Anna Sayring &	West Wyalong – Girral
	Kate O'Connor	Lake					Dannielle Wilson	Tullibigeal
2020	In recess:COVID-19							
2021	Maddison Morris	Hillston	Fiona Bryant	Ungarie	Belinda Duncan	West Wyalong Girral	Lana Maitland	West Wyalong Girral
			Bronte Doyle	Tullibigeal				
			Brooke Kirby	Lake				
2022	Kate O'Connor	Tullibigeal	Katrina Thomas	Ungarie	Renee Morris &	Hillston	Rory Burge &	West Wyalong Girral
					Charlotte Whiley	West Wyalong Girral	Tori Martin	West Wyalong Girral
Year	A. Grade	Club	B. Grade	Club	C. Grade	Club	C. Reserve	Club

== Leading Goalkicker ==
Senior Football
Sanson Trophy

Year	Most Goals	Club	Goals	Finals Goals	Total Goals
1978	Ian Wason	Ungarie	57	4	61
1979	Phil Hague	Four Corners	76	0	76
Sanson Trophy					
1980	Gary Koop	Ungarie	81	7	88
1981	Garry Koop	Ungarie	69	5	74
1982	Phil Hague	Four Corners	59	2	61
1983	Phil Hague	Four Corners	70	9	79
1984	Phil Hague	Four Corners	57	4	61
1985	Adam Noll	Condo Milby	107	9	116
1986	Tim Forster	Girral West Wyalong	43	5	48
1987	Peter Ridley	Four Corners	43	5	48
1988	Ron Finch	Four Corners	58	7	65
1989	Adam Noll	Condo Milby	107	9	116
1990	Phil Hague	Lake Cargelligo	80	5	85
1991	Steven Bennett	Lake Cargelligo	44	4	48
1992	Jason Boneham	Girral West Wyalong	79	6	85
1993	Mark Daniher	Girral West Wyalong	55	12	67
1994	John Dobinson	Parkes	54	0	54
1995	Somin McNeill	Barellan	67	14	81
1996	Gerald Simpson	Barellan	51	9	60
1997	Harry Nicholls	Barellan	57	5	62
1998	Adam Noll	Condo Milby	86	6	92
1999	Jamie Grintell	Ungarie	83	10	93
2000	Wes Kendall	Lake Cargelligo	88	14	102
2001	Wes Kendall	Lake Cargelligo	70	7	77
2002	Jamie Grintell	Girral West Wyalong	62	6	68
2003	Wes Kendall	Lake Cargelligo	80	11	91
2004	Wes Kendall	Lake Cargelligo	73	15	88
2005	Wes Kendall	Lake Cargelligo	60	24	84
2006	Wes Kendall	Lake Cargelligo	55	5	60
2007	Wes Kendall	Lake Cargelligo	64	16	80
2008	Wes Kendall &	Lake Cargelligo	60	19	79
	Troy Glasgow	Tullibigeal	60	9	69
2009	Matt Smith	West Wyalong Girral	62	3	65
2010	Daryl Clayton	Barellan	66	1	67
2011	Daryl Clayton	Barellan	92	13	105
2012	Geoff Walker	West Wyalong Girral	38	8	46
2013	Geoff Walker	West Wyalong Girral	38	8	46
2014	Brenton Browne	Tullibigeal	67	10	77
2015	Jayden Erwin	Ungarie	49	8	57
2016	Mitchell Johnston	Lake Cargellico	66	9	75
2017	Kurt Stubenrauch	West Wyalong Girral	48	0	48
2018	Brant Frankel	Tullibigeal	53	3	56
2019	Joshua Smith	Hillston	70	2	72
2020	in recess COVID-19				
2021	Simon Clarke	West Wyalong Girral	33	1	34
2022	Matthew Pert	West Wyalong Girral	61	3	64
2023	Kevin Newman	Lake Cargelligo	49	7	56
2024	Lachlan Robertson	Lake Cargelligo	51	10	61
2025	Sam Fensom	Hillston	49	4	53

== VFL / AFL Players ==
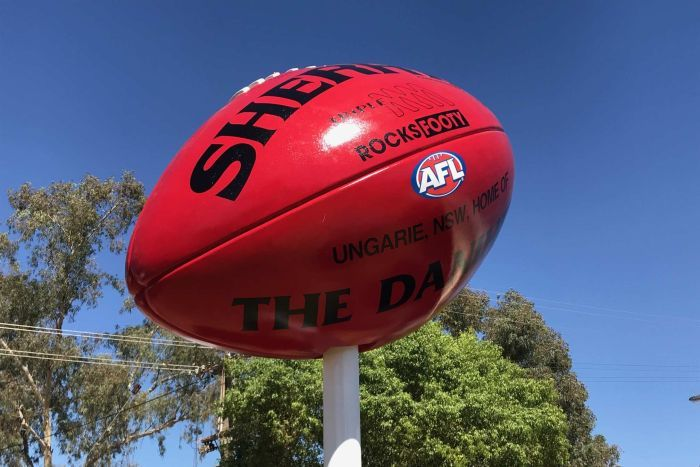
The Big Football, Ungarie, NSW. In honour of the Daniher family.

The following footballers played senior VFL / AFL football, with the year indicating their VFL / AFL debut.

- 1976 – Terry Daniher – Ungarie to South Melbourne
- 1979 – Neale Daniher – Ungarie to Essendon
- 1981 – Anthony Daniher – Ungarie to South Melbourne
- 1987 – Chris Daniher – Ungarie to Essendon
- 2000 – Ben Fixter – Ungarie to Sydney Swans
- 2003 – Kyle Archibald – Ungarie to Richmond (No.81 in 2003 draft, but no senior games).

== Office Bearers ==
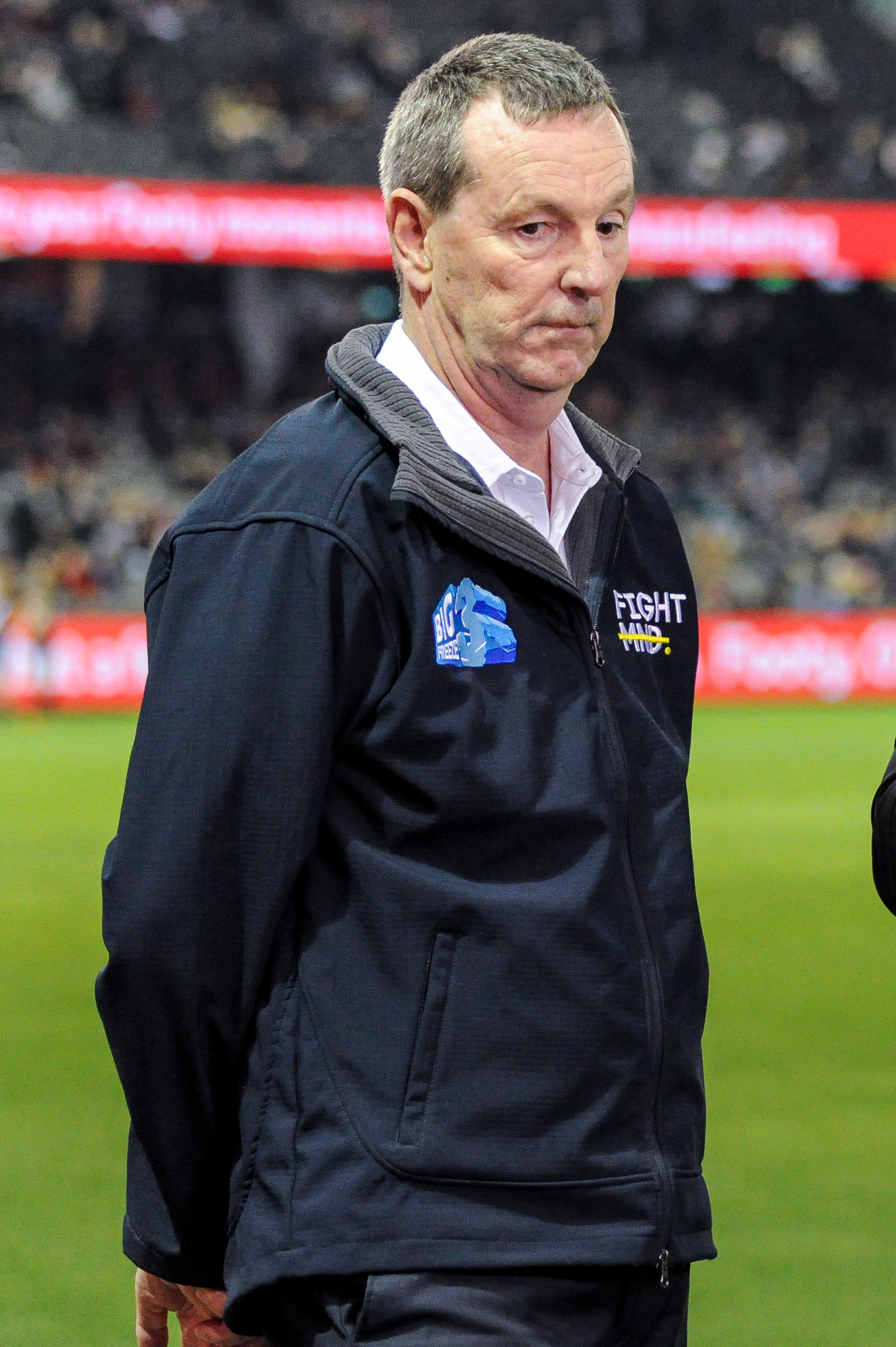
Neale Daniher

Year	President	Secretary	Treasurer	Notes
	Northern Riverina FA			
1924–29	Jack Blair	Arthur W Stidwell	Arthur W Stidwell	
1930–31	Sam D. Lamont	Arthur Stidwell	Arthur Stidwell	
1932–36	M J "Brownie" Vallance	Arthur Stidwell	Arthur Stidwell	
1937	M J "Brownie" Vallance	R J McCann	R J McCann	
1938–39	M J "Brownie" Vallance	H J Harley	H J Harley	
1939	M J "Brownie" Vallance	H J Harley	H J Harley	
1940–41	Tom Alexander	H J Harley	H J Harley	
1942–45				NRFA in recess > World War II
1946	Tom Alexander	H J Harley	H J Harley	
1947	Tom Alexander	G Les Sim	H J Harley	
1948	M J "Brownie" Vallance	G Les Sim	G Les Sim	
1949–50	M J "Brownie" Vallance	Ray A Lampard	Ray A Lampard	
1951–52	George Ward	G Les Sim	G Les Sim	
1953–54	George Ward	Hugh Wales	Hugh Wales	
1955	M J "Brownie" Vallance	Hugh Wales	Hugh Wales	
1956–57	Jim Dale	Ray Preuss	Ray Preuss	
1958–63	Bill Brewer	Cliff Harwood	Cliff Harwood	
1964–71	John E Delahunty	John S Pritchard	John S Pritchard	
1972–80	John E Delahunty	Jim Blacker	Jim Blacker	
1981	Cliff McCrum	Jim Blacker	Jim Blacker	
1982	Cliff McCrum	Maurie Seaton	Donna Tyack	
1983–84	Leo Ward	Maurie Seaton	Donna Tyack	
1985–87	Leo Ward	J Daniher/M Seaton	Daryl Henley	
1988	Leo Ward	Jim Daniher	Daryl Henley	
1989	Stan Hague	Jim Daniher	Daryl Henley	
1990–92	Stan Hague	Jim Daniher	Melva Koop	
1993–94	Stan Hague	Loraine Haase	Melva Koop	
1995–96	Stan Hague	Loraine Haase	Phil Irvine	
1997	Stan Hague	Loraine Haase	Ian Hunter	
1998–2000	Stan Hague	Bill Adams	Ian Hunter	
2001–04	Stan Hague	Leanne Imrie	Ian Hunter	
2005	Stan Hague	Leanne Imrie	Pat Daniher	
2006–10	Pat Daniher	Leanne Imrie	Keith Rees	
2011–14	Peter McFayden	Iam Aubrey	Keith Rees	

== See also ==
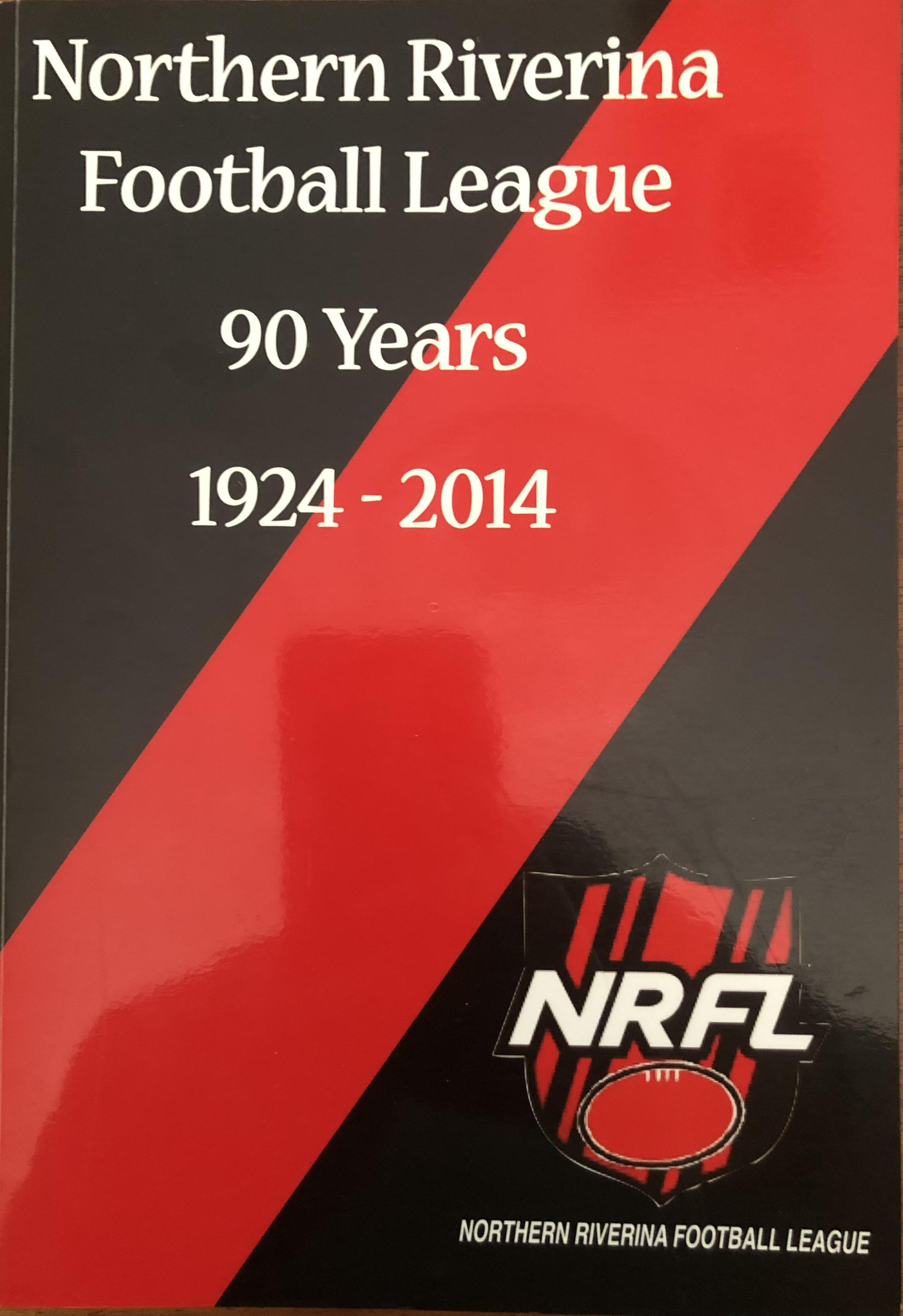
Northern Riverina Football League. 452 page, 90-year history book from 1924 to 2014. By Keith Rees

- AFL NSW/ACT
- List of Australian rules football clubs in Australia
- Australian rules football in New South Wales
- Albury & District Football League
- Central Hume Football Association
- Central Riverina Football League
- Coreen & District Football League
- Farrer Football League
- Faithful & District Football Association
- Hume Football Netball League
- Riverina Football Association
- Riverina Football Netball League
- South West Football League (New South Wales)
- Central West Australian Football League
- Group 20 Rugby League
- Group 17 Rugby League
