= Ungarie Football Club =

Ungarie

Names
- Full name: Ungarie Football Netball Club
- Nickname(s): Magpies

2015 season
- After finals: Premiers
- Home-and-away season: 2nd out of 6 (9 wins, 4 losses)

Club details
- Founded: 1916
- Colours: Black White
- Competition: Northern Riverina Football League
- Premierships: 17 (1923, 1935, 1950, 1956, 1959, 1960, 1961, 1974, 1978, 1979, 1983, 1985, 1986, 1999, 2000, 2001, 2015)
- Ground(s): Ungarie Recreation Ground

Other information
- Official website: Ungarie FNC website

The Ungarie Football Netball Club (nicknamed The Magpies) is an Australian rules football and netball club that plays in the Northern Riverina Football Netball League (NRFNL). Formed in 1916, the Magpies are most famous for producing the Daniher brothers (Terry, Neale, Anthony and Chris), as well as Ben Fixter.

== History ==
=== Formation and early years ===
The Ungarie Football Club was formed in 1916, forty-four years after the founding of Ungarie in 1872.

The Magpies' existence first saw them play against Blow Clear in friendly social games in 1916 and played in the "Cup" competition in 1917 and 1918.

1917 after which the Ungarie-Girral Australian Rules Football Association was formed in 1918. Five years later, the Magpies won their only Ungarie-Girral Australian Rules Football Association premiership in 1923. One year later, the Ungarie-Girral Australian Rules Football Association amalgamated with the Lake Cargelligo Australian Rules Football Association to form the Northern Riverina Australian Rules Football Association (NRARFA).

=== 20th century ===
The Magpies enjoyed their first eighty-four years of existence, winning forty-one premierships across six grades of football and netball, with these being:

- Seniors: 1923, 1935, 1950, 1956, 1959, 1960, 1961, 1974, 1978, 1979, 1983, 1985, 1986, 1999
- Under 16/17s: 1974, 1975, 1976, 1977, 1978, 1981, 1982, 1986, 1987, 1990, 1991, 1992, 1995, 1996
- Under 13s (Football): 1981, 1982, 1983, 1987, 1988, 1992, 1994
- A-Grade: 1993, 1997, 1998, 1999
- B-Grade: 1995
- Under 13s/14s (Netball): 1998

=== 21st century ===
Since the beginning of the 21st century, the Magpies have continued to enjoy their existence, winning nineteen premierships across six grades of football and netball, with these being:

- Seniors: 2000, 2001, 2015
- Under 17s: 2009, 2023
- Under 13s/14s: 2001, 2006, 2011
- Under 12s: 2002, 2009
- A-Grade: 2000, 2001, 2005, 2006, 2007, 2008, 2009, 2013, 2014
- B-Grade: 2000

== Club honours ==
=== Football ===
==== Seniors ====
- Ungarie-Girral Australian Rules Football Association Premierships: (1)

1923

- NRFL Premierships: (16)

1935, 1950, 1956, 1959, 1960, 1961, 1974, 1978, 1979, 1983, 1985, 1986, 1999, 2000, 2001, 2015

- NRFL Runners-Up: (7)

1982, 1984, 1990, 1994, 1995, 1998, 2003

- NRFL Minor Premierships: (11)

1978, 1979, 1982, 1983, 1984, 1985, 1986, 1990, 1995, 1999, 2000

- Undefeated in Home & Away season: (8)

1978, 1979, 1982, 1983, 1984, 1985, 1986, 1995

==== Under 16s/17s ====
- NRFL Premierships: (16)

1974, 1975, 1976, 1977, 1978, 1981, 1982, 1986, 1987, 1990, 1991, 1992, 1995, 1996, 2009, 2023.

- NRFL Runners-Up: (3)

2008, 2011, 2022

- NRFL Minor Premierships: (3)

1991, 2009, 2023.

- Undefeated in Home & Away season: (1)

2009

==== Under 13s/14s ====
- NRFL Premierships: (10)

1981, 1982, 1983, 1987, 1988, 1992, 1994, 2001, 2006, 2011

- NRFL Runners-Up: (2)

2015, 2023.

==== Under 12s ====
- NRFL Premierships: (2)

2002, 2009

- NRFL Runners-Up: (4)

2005, 2006, 2007, 2008

=== Netball ===
==== A-Grade ====
- NRNL Premierships: (13)

1993, 1997, 1998, 1999, 2000, 2001, 2005, 2006, 2007, 2008, 2009, 2013, 2014

- NRNL Runners-Up: (1)

2011

==== B-Grade ====
- NRNL Premierships: (2)

1995, 2000

==== Under 13s/14s ====
- NRNL Premierships: (1)

1998
