= King's Birthday match (AFL) =

Annual AFL match held in Victoria

Coordinates: 37°49′12″S 144°59′00″E

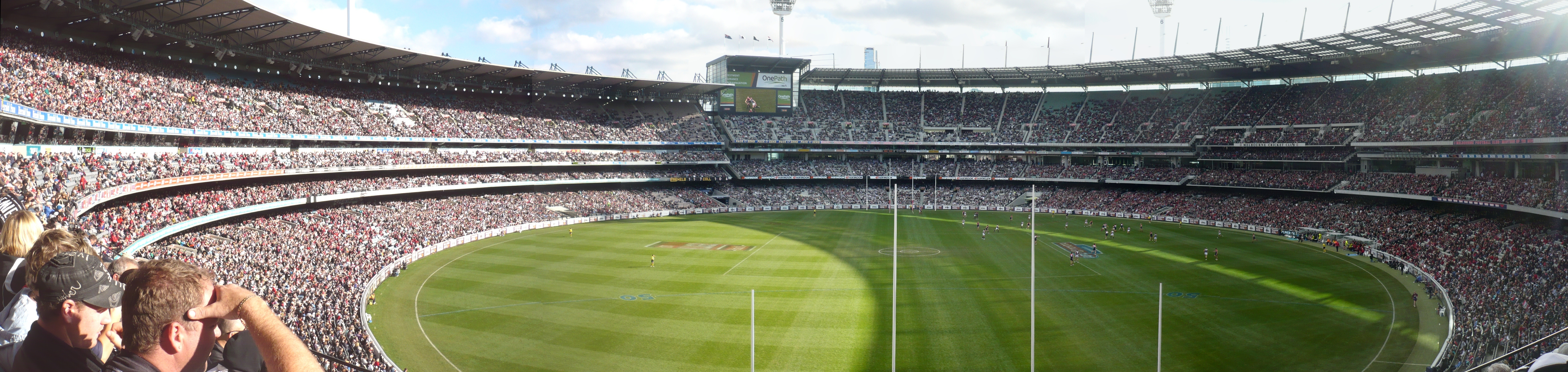
- Panorama of the 2011 Queen's Birthday match

- Collingwood Melbourne
- Other names: Queen's Birthday match (2001–2022)
- Location: Melbourne, Victoria
- First meeting: 11 June 2001
- Latest meeting: 8 June 2026
- Next meeting: 7 June 2027
- Broadcasters: Seven Network (2001, 2012–present); Network Ten (2002–2011)
- Stadiums: Melbourne Cricket Ground

Statistics
- All-time series (Australian Football League only): Collingwood (16 wins); Draw(s) 1 Melbourne (8 Wins)
- Largest victory: Collingwood: 88 points 13 June 2011
- Longest win streak: Collingwood: 5; 2011–2015
- Current win streak: Melbourne: 1; 2026–present

The King's Birthday match, known as the Queen's Birthday match when the reigning monarch is a woman, is an annual Australian rules football match between the Melbourne Football Club and Collingwood Football Club in the Australian Football League (AFL), held at the Melbourne Cricket Ground (MCG) on the King's Birthday public holiday in Victoria (the second Monday in June).

Since 2015, the match has been preceded by the Big Freeze, a charitable event raising funds into research for motor neuron disease (MND) through FightMND. The event sees celebrities slide into a pool of ice water as a curtain-raiser to the match.

== History ==
Football has been played on the Queen's or King's Birthday public holiday since before the first season of the Victorian Football League in 1897. In most years, the VFL scheduled three matches to take place on the public holiday. Since 1936, the public holiday has been set as the second Monday in June.

Melbourne and Collingwood first faced off in a Queen's Birthday fixture in Round 3, 1898, with Melbourne winning by 10 points. The teams have a long-standing rivalry that was solidified in the 1950s and 1960s when the two sides were the dominant forces in the VFL. Having defeated Collingwood in the 1955 and 1956 grand finals, Melbourne was prevented from equalling Collingwood's record four premierships in a row when Collingwood was victorious in the 1958 grand final. That same year, a crowd of 99,256 saw a top-of-the-table match between the two teams on the Queen's Birthday public holiday; as of 2024, that remains a record for the highest ever home-and-away crowd. Melbourne later defeated Collingwood in the 1960 and 1964 grand finals. Almost half of Melbourne's 13 VFL/AFL premierships came against Collingwood, and the teams have met in seven grand finals, the most of any pairing.

Since 2001, the AFL has scheduled Melbourne against Collingwood at the Melbourne Cricket Ground as the only match played on the public holiday each year, and this is considered the start of the modern Queen's Birthday match as a stand-alone event. Prior to this, Melbourne and Collingwood had faced each other on the King's/Queen's Birthday public holiday on ten occasions: 1898, 1950, 1958, 1961, 1964, 1977, 1983, 1993, 1996 and 1999; among those, the 1996 match was the only time it was the sole match scheduled for the day. The round in which the game is played is sometimes referred to as the "King's/Queen's Birthday Round", although Queensland and Western Australia do not celebrate the monarch's official birthday public holiday on the same date as Victoria.

The fixture is traditionally staged at the Melbourne Cricket Ground, which is the home ground for both teams. From 2001 until 2018, the match was always a designated Melbourne home game, resulting in Melbourne receiving a greater portion of the gate and its highest match profit of each season, typically in the order of $800,000 to $900,000. Collingwood, which had a substantially higher membership and more blockbuster fixtures than Melbourne, agreed to and encouraged the deal over that period. Since 2019, when a period of success had seen Melbourne close the financial gap between the clubs, the clubs have agreed to alternate the home team designation between the two clubs each year, with Collingwood's first home game played in 2019.

The COVID-19 pandemic interrupted the game's continuity for two years: the match was not played at all in 2020, and it was relocated to the Sydney Cricket Ground at short notice due to a lockdown in Victoria in 2021.

== Match results ==
This table lists all Queen's/King's Birthday matches since it became an annual fixture between Melbourne and Collingwood in 2001.

	Year	Home team	Score	Away team	Score	Ground	Crowd	Result/Winner	M	H2H	NDT
1	2001	Melbourne	8.9 (57)	Collingwood	19.20 (134)	Melbourne Cricket Ground	62,761	Collingwood	77	+1	Anthony Rocca (Col)
2	2002	Melbourne	10.15 (75)	Collingwood	19.12 (126)	Melbourne Cricket Ground	65,860	Collingwood	51	+2	Chris Tarrant (Col)
3	2003	Melbourne	10.17 (77)	Collingwood	20.13 (133)	Melbourne Cricket Ground	60,010	Collingwood	56	+3	Paul Licuria (Col)
4	2004	Melbourne	12.10 (82)	Collingwood	11.7 (73)	Melbourne Cricket Ground	56,988	Melbourne	9	+2	Josh Fraser (Col)
5	2005	Melbourne	17.15 (117)	Collingwood	10.12 (72)	Melbourne Cricket Ground	65,347	Melbourne	45	+1	Travis Johnstone (Mel)
6	2006	Melbourne	22.9 (141)	Collingwood	14.10 (94)	Melbourne Cricket Ground	78,773	Melbourne	47		Cameron Bruce (Mel)
7	2007	Melbourne	13.16 (94)	Collingwood	11.15 (81)	Melbourne Cricket Ground	70,660	Melbourne	13	+1	Russell Robertson (Mel)
8	2008	Melbourne	13.17 (95)	Collingwood	17.14 (116)	Melbourne Cricket Ground	59,548	Collingwood	21		Tarkyn Lockyer (Col)
9	2009	Melbourne	8.12 (60)	Collingwood	19.12 (126)	Melbourne Cricket Ground	61,287	Collingwood	66	+1	Scott Pendlebury (Col)
10	2010	Melbourne	11.10 (76)	Collingwood	9.22 (76)	Melbourne Cricket Ground	67,454	Draw	0	+1	Aaron Davey (Mel)
11	2011	Melbourne	6.5 (41)	Collingwood	19.15 (129)	Melbourne Cricket Ground	75,998	Collingwood	88	+2	Sharrod Wellingham (Col)
12	2012	Melbourne	13.9 (87)	Collingwood	19.15 (129)	Melbourne Cricket Ground	64,250	Collingwood	42	+3	Dane Swan (Col)
13	2013	Melbourne	5.9 (39)	Collingwood	17.20 (122)	Melbourne Cricket Ground	50,835	Collingwood	83	+4	Dane Swan (Col)
14	2014	Melbourne	3.10 (28)	Collingwood	8.13 (61)	Melbourne Cricket Ground	68,130	Collingwood	33	+5	Bernie Vince (Mel)
15	2015	Melbourne	13.7 (85)	Collingwood	17.8 (110)	Melbourne Cricket Ground	66,120	Collingwood	25	+6	Travis Cloke (Col)
16	2016	Melbourne	16.8 (104)	Collingwood	8.10 (58)	Melbourne Cricket Ground	60,158	Melbourne	46	+5	Max Gawn (Mel)
17	2017	Melbourne	15.14 (104)	Collingwood	15.10 (100)	Melbourne Cricket Ground	70,926	Melbourne	4	+4	Christian Petracca (Mel)
18	2018	Melbourne	14.7 (91)	Collingwood	20.13 (133)	Melbourne Cricket Ground	83,518	Collingwood	42	+5	Mason Cox (Col)
19	2019	Collingwood	15.8 (98)	Melbourne	7.15 (57)	Melbourne Cricket Ground	74,036	Collingwood	41	+6	Adam Treloar (Col)
	2020	No match played due to the COVID-19 pandemic									
20	2021	Melbourne	9.9 (63)	Collingwood	11.14 (80)	Sydney Cricket Ground	16,453	Collingwood	17	+7	Scott Pendlebury (Col)
21	2022	Collingwood	12.10 (82)	Melbourne	8.8 (56)	Melbourne Cricket Ground	76,059	Collingwood	26	+8	Clayton Oliver (Mel)
22	2023	Melbourne	8.18 (66)	Collingwood	9.8 (62)	Melbourne Cricket Ground	83,578	Melbourne	4	+7	Jack Viney (Mel)
23	2024	Collingwood	14.5 (89)	Melbourne	6.15 (51)	Melbourne Cricket Ground	84,659	Collingwood	38	+8	Jack Crisp (Col)
24	2025	Melbourne	10.11 (71)	Collingwood	11.6 (72)	Melbourne Cricket Ground	77,761	Collingwood	1	+9	Josh Daicos (Col)
25	2026	Collingwood	11.9 (75)	Melbourne	12.11 (83)	Melbourne Cricket Ground	88,019	Melbourne	8	+8	Kysaiah Pickett (Mel)

Notes:
Capacity in 2003, 2004 and 2005 was reduced due to the redevelopment of the Melbourne Cricket Ground for the 2006 Commonwealth Games.
Since 2015 the best player afield has been awarded the Neale Daniher Trophy. Names prior to 2015 refer to the player awarded three Brownlow Medal votes.
The 2021 match was played at the Sydney Cricket Ground due to the COVID-19 pandemic and crowd restrictions imposed in Victoria.

== Neale Daniher Trophy ==
In 2015, the Neale Daniher Trophy was first awarded to the best player of the match. It is named after former Melbourne coach Neale Daniher, who succumbed to the disease in 2026 (albeit more than a decade after he was expected to live), two weeks before Big Freeze 12.

== Big Freeze at the 'G ==
In 2014, Daniher made his motor neuron disease (MND) diagnosis public, having been initially diagnosed the year before, and set about helping raise funds for researching the disease. Since then, the Big Freeze at the 'G has a Motor Neuron Disease fundraiser event associated with the King's/Queen's Birthday match. In support of the "Cure for MND Foundation", well known football, sporting, entertainment and media personalities slide into a giant ice pool on the ground before the start of the game. Such personalities usually pledge to raise $10,000 for MND research after being nominated, and once successful at hitting this target, they then get to pass on the challenge and nominate the next personality into the "cold seat". This person in turn will raise funds and agree to "Freeze for MND" if their fundraising goal is met. The challenge will continue right up until the game, with each celebrity challenging the next. The first Big Freeze was held in 2015, and the Neale Daniher Trophy was established in the same year and awarded to the best player on the ground.

As of June 2026, prior to Big Freeze 12, FightMND has directed over A$157 million towards Motor Neurone Disease research and care. This total comprises A$117 million raised directly through public donations—driven heavily by the annual Big Freeze events at the King's Birthday match—bolstered by more than A$40 million in grants from the Australian Government and Victorian State Government.

=== Participants ===
Big Freeze 1 (2015)

Over A$2.2 million was raised.

- Tim Watson, former Essendon player, AFL commentator for the Seven Network.
- Sam Lane, Television and radio personality, journalist and commentator.
- Ross Stevenson, radio personality for 3AW.
- Dermott Brereton, former Hawthorn player, television and radio commentator for Fox Footy and SEN 1116.
- Luke Darcy, former Western Bulldogs player, television and radio commentator.
- Sam Newman, former Geelong player, television and radio personality, host of The Footy Show.
- Brian Taylor, former Collingwood player, television and radio commentator for the Seven Network and Triple M.
- Garry Lyon, former Melbourne player, television and radio commentator, host of The Footy Show.
- Mick Molloy, comedian, television and radio personality for Triple M.
- Mark Robinson, Journalist, television and newspaper personality, host of AFL 360.
- Bryan 'Strauchanie' Strauchan, fictional Collingwood football player portrayed by comedian Peter Helliar, television and radio personality.

Big Freeze 2 (2016)

Over A$4 million was raised.

- Matthew Richardson, former Richmond player, AFL commentator for the Seven Network.
- Matthew Lloyd, former Essendon player, AFL commentator for 3AW.
- Kevin Sheedy, legendary AFL player and coach.
- Eddie McGuire, President of Collingwood, AFL commentator for Fox Footy and Triple M radio.
- David Koch, President of Port Adelaide, host of Sunrise.
- Samantha Armytage, Australian journalist, host of Sunrise.
- Jonathan Brown, former Brisbane Lions player, television and radio personality, Fox Footy and Nova 100.
- Anthony Lehmann, comedian, television and radio personality, Network Ten and Gold 104.3.
- Cameron Ling, former Geelong player, AFL commentator for the Seven Network.
- Gerard Whateley, ABC Sports commentator, host of AFL 360.
- Dave Hughes, comedian, television and radio personality, recurring panellist on The Footy Show.

Big Freeze 3 (2017)

Over A$6.3 million was raised.

- Lleyton Hewitt, Australian tennis champion, former world number 1.
- Steve Hooker, Australian Pole Vaulter, Olympic gold medallist.
- Alisa Camplin, Australian aerial skier, Olympic gold medallist.
- Steven Bradbury, Australian speed skater, Olympic gold medallist.
- Steve Moneghetti, Australian long-distance runner, Commonwealth Games gold medallist.
- Andrew Gaze, Australian basketballer, 2× NBA champion.
- Sharelle McMahon, Australian netballer
- Adam Gilchrist, Australian cricketer

Big Freeze 4 (2018)

Over A$8.2 million was raised.

- Don Pyke, Adelaide senior coach
- Chris Fagan, Brisbane Lions senior coach
- Brendon Bolton, Carlton senior coach
- Nathan Buckley, Collingwood senior coach
- John Worsfold, Essendon senior coach
- Ross Lyon, Fremantle senior coach
- Chris Scott, Geelong senior coach
- Stuart Dew, Gold Coast senior coach
- Leon Cameron, Greater Western Sydney senior coach
- Alastair Clarkson, Hawthorn senior coach
- Simon Goodwin, Melbourne senior coach
- Brad Scott, North Melbourne senior coach
- Ken Hinkley, Port Adelaide senior coach
- Damien Hardwick, Richmond senior coach
- John Longmire, Sydney Swans senior coach
- Alan Richardson, St Kilda senior coach
- Adam Simpson, West Coast Eagles senior coach
- Luke Beveridge, Western Bulldogs senior coach

Big Freeze 5 (2019)

Over A$5.4 million was raised.

- Cyril Rioli, former Hawthorn player
- Lauren Jackson, former basketball player
- Dane Swan, former Collingwood player
- Nick Riewoldt, former St Kilda player
- Brendan Fevola, former Carlton & Brisbane Lions player
- Jimmy Bartel, former Geelong player
- Anna Meares, former Olympic cyclist
- Bianca Chatfield, former netball player
- Jobe Watson, former Essendon player
- Chris Judd, former West Coast & Carlton player
- Liam Picken, former Western Bulldogs player
- Bob Murphy, former Western Bulldogs player
- Sam Mitchell, former Hawthorn & West Coast player
- Brent Harvey, former North Melbourne player

Big Freeze 6 (2020)

Over A$11.9 million was raised. No Queen's Birthday match was played due to the COVID-19 pandemic, but a Big Freeze television event occurred with a player from every club involved.

Big Freeze 7 (2021)

Over A$14 million was raised. Big Freeze 7 was held at the Melbourne Cricket Ground on the day of the Queen's Birthday match, but the match itself was staged at the Sydney Cricket Ground due to the COVID-19 pandemic.

- Abbey Holmes, former Adelaide player
- Billy Brownless, former Geelong player
- Shane Crawford, 1999 Brownlow Medal winner and former Hawthorn player
- Ray Chamberlain, AFL umpire
- Sharni Norder, former netball player and Collingwood player, Bounce panelist
- Russel Howcroft, media personality
- Sarah Jones, Fox Footy host
- Jeff Farmer, former Melbourne and Fremantle player
- Daisy Pearce, Melbourne captain
- Gillon McLachlan, AFL CEO

Craig Bellamy, coach of the Melbourne Storm NRL team was also selected to slide, but was unable to leave his team's hub in Queensland, so instead he did an Ice Bucket Challenge.

Big Freeze 8 (2022)

Over A$19 million was raised.

- Ash Barty, former world No. 1 tennis player
- Eddie Betts, former Adelaide & Carlton player
- Terry Daniher, former Essendon player & older brother to Neale
- Rhonda Burchmore, entertainer & actor
- Hamish Blake, comedian & Melbourne supporter
- Andrew Maher, co-host of The Front Bar
- Rebecca Maddern, Seven News Melbourne presenter
- David Neitz, former Melbourne captain
- Justin Langer, former Australian cricket team coach
- Jakara Anthony, skier & 2022 Winter Olympics gold medallist

Big Freeze 9 (2023)

Over A$15.8 million was raised.

- Mick Fanning, 3× ASP World Champion
- Shaun Burgoyne, former Port Adelaide & Hawthorn player
- Tony Shaw, former Collingwood player
- Michelle Payne, 2015 Melbourne Cup winning jockey
- Eric Bana, actor & St Kilda supporter
- Jason Dunstall, former Hawthorn player and current Fox Footy commentator
- Abbey Gelmi, Seven News Melbourne weekend sports presenter
- Tayla Harris, current Melbourne player
- Aaron Finch, former Australian cricket team ODI and T20I captain

Big Freeze 10 (2024)

Over A$20.1 million was raised.

- Pat Rafter, former Australian tennis player and two-time US Open champion.
- Erin Phillips, former WNBL and WNBA champion, former Adelaide and Port Adelaide player.
- Nic Naitanui, former West Coast player.
- James Brayshaw, former cricketer, current television and radio commentator for the Seven Network and Triple M.
- Joel Selwood, former Geelong captain and four-time premiership player.
- Sally Pearson, former sprinter and hurdler, Olympic gold medallist.
- Meg Lanning, current cricketer.
- Jack Riewoldt, former Richmond player and three-time premiership player.
- Mack Horton, former swimmer, Olympic gold medallist.

Big Freeze 11 (2025)

- Ariarne Titmus, Olympic swimming gold medallist (dressed as Olivia Newton-John)
- Cadel Evans, former professional racing cyclist (dressed as Max Gawn)
- Peter Daicos, former Collingwood player (dressed as Heath Ledger)
- Matt Nable, actor and former professional rugby league footballer (dressed as Angus Young)
- Liz Watson, captain of the Australian Diamonds (dressed as Margot Robbie)
- Matt Shirvington, former Olympic sprinter and television presenter (dressed as Chris Hemsworth)
- Alyssa Healy, Australian cricketer (dressed as Magda Szubanski)
- Aaron Davey, former Melbourne player (dressed as Michael Long)
- Craig Lowndes, Australian racing driver (dressed as Mad Max)
- Mark Taylor, former Australian cricket captain (dressed as Shane Warne)

Big Freeze 12 (2026)

- Nathan Jones, former Melbourne player and current coach (dressed as FISHER)
- Dale Thomas, former AFL footballer (dressed as Mick Malthouse)
- Mark Howard, AFL commentator (dressed as Jason Dunstall)
- Sam Mac, TV personality (dressed as Bluey)
- Andy Lee, comedian (dressed as Wizz, a character from his children's book series "Do Not Open This Book")
- Sam Mostyn, Governor General of Australia (dressed as Neale Daniher)
- Jo Weston, netball champion (dressed as Kylie Minogue)
- Dan Gorringe, ex-footballer and media personality (dressed as Josh Fraser)
- Cooper Woods, Winter Olympian (dressed as Mick Fanning)
- Amy Shark, pop star (dressed as Amy Winehouse)

== See also ==
- King's Birthday match (NRL)
