= FightMND =

Australian not-for-profit researching Motor Neurone Disease

- Formation: 2014; 12 years ago in Melbourne
- Headquarters: Melbourne, Australia
- Fields: Motor neurone disease
- Endowment: AU$155.78 million
- Website: https://fightmnd.org.au/

FightMND is an Australian not-for-profit organisation focused on funding and promoting research into finding effective treatments and ultimately a cure for Motor Neurone Disease (MND), also known as Amyotrophic Lateral Sclerosis (ALS). It is one of Australia's most prominent charities dedicated to this cause and is well known for its annual Big Freeze fundraising campaign, held in conjunction with an Australian Football League (AFL) match at the Melbourne Cricket Ground.

== History ==
FightMND was co-founded in 2014 by the following individuals: Neale Daniher, a former AFL player and coach; Dr. Ian Davis, an MND researcher and patient; and Pat Cunningham, a businessman and advocate. The organisation was launched after Daniher was diagnosed with MND in 2013. Determined to fight the disease not just for himself but for the thousands affected by it, Daniher became the public face of the campaign, inspiring widespread support across Australia.

Motor Neurone Disease is a progressive neurological condition that attacks the motor neurons in the brain and spinal cord, leading to muscle weakness, paralysis, and eventually death. There is currently no known cure or effective long-term treatment, and the average life expectancy after diagnosis is 27 months.

== The Big Freeze ==
One of FightMND’s hallmark events is the Big Freeze, an annual awareness and fundraising campaign launched in 2015. It is held during the King’s Birthday public holiday AFL match in June, typically between the Collingwood Football Club and Melbourne Football Club at the Melbourne Cricket Ground (MCG). The event is best known for the “Big Freeze Slide,” in which well-known Australian celebrities, sportspeople, and media personalities wear quirky costumes and slide into a pool of icy water before the match, symbolising the "freezing" effect that MND has on the body.

The campaign is accompanied by the sale of blue FightMND beanies, which have become iconic symbols of support across the AFL community and beyond. Funds raised from the Big Freeze support clinical trials, research grants, and initiatives to improve the quality of life for people living with MND.

In May 2025, 7NEWS reported on the launch of the Big Freeze campaign outside Melbourne’s Flinders Street Station. The event featured the charity’s blue beanie, described as an “iconic symbol”, with an inflatable version displayed on the station wall. One family member noted that sharing Daniher’s diagnosis publicly helped the family maintain optimism and resilience during his illness. The event was also covered by The Canberra Times, which highlighted the campaign’s national reach ahead of the King’s Birthday AFL match at the MCG. The report included remarks from Daniher encouraging young Australians to develop resilience, and noted his view that the campaign has grown through widespread community support.

== Impact ==
As of May 2026, FightMND has directed over A$157 million towards Motor Neurone Disease research and care. This total comprises more than A$157 million raised directly through public donations—driven heavily by the annual Big Freeze events at the King's Birthday match—bolstered by more than A$40 million in grants from the Australian Government and Victorian State Government, plus a further $40 million donation by private benefactors, construction magnate couple Quentin and Kylie Birt. FightMND's efforts have significantly increased public awareness of MND in Australia, boosted funding for scientific research, and created a sense of solidarity and hope among patients and their families. The organisation collaborates with research institutions nationally and internationally to fast-track the development of new therapies.

Neale Daniher’s advocacy has earned widespread admiration, and he has received multiple honours, including being named a Member of the Order of Australia (AM) and Victorian of the Year, as well as being recognised for the 2025 Australian of the Year for his leadership in the fight against MND.

== See also ==
- Motor Neurone Disease
- Amyotrophic Lateral Sclerosis (ALS)
- Neale Daniher
- Australian Football League (AFL)
