= Ben Fixter =

Australian rules football player

Personal information
- Born: 23 June 1981 (age 45)
- Original teams: Ungarie (Northern Riverina Football League); Wagga Tigers (Riverina Football League)
- Draft: No. 6 in 1999 AFL draft No. 6 in 2006 Pre-season Draft
- Height: 180 cm (5 ft 11 in)
- Weight: 84 kg (185 lb)
- Position: Defender

Playing career^{1}
| Years | Club | Games (Goals) |
| 2000–2005 | Sydney | 27 (8) |
| 2006–2007 | Brisbane | 27 (3) |
| Total | | 54 (11) |
- ^{1} Playing statistics correct to the end of 2007.

Ben Fixter (born 23 June 1981) is an Australian rules football player who played with the Sydney and Brisbane Football Clubs in the Australian Football League (AFL). Ben played with the Charles Sturt University Football Club in the Farrer Football League, a semi-professional football league based in the Riverina region of New South Wales.

== AFL career ==
Ben was recruited by the Sydney Swans as the number 6 draft pick in the 1999 AFL draft from the NSW/ACT Rams. He made his debut for the Swans in Round 18, 2000 against Melbourne. His career at Sydney was plagued by constant injury, limiting him to 27 games over four seasons. After being delisted by the Swans at the end of the 2005 season, Ben was recruited by the Brisbane Lions as the number 6 draft pick in the 2006 Pre-season Draft. He made his debut for the Lions in Round 1, 2006 against Geelong. On 22 September 2007, Ben was delisted by the Lions.

== Post AFL ==
After Ben was delisted by the Lions, AFLQ club Labrador Tigers appointed him as Club Development Manager and player for the 2008 and 2009 seasons. After the 2009 season, Ben returned to New South Wales to play for Ovens and Murray Football League club Albury in 2010 before leaving the district to play for Riverina Football League club Coolamon in 2011 and Farrer Football League club Charles Sturt University in 2012.
