= AFL Central West =

Australian rules football competition

- Sport: Australian rules football
- Founded: 1982; 44 years ago
- Website: aflcentralwest.com.au

The AFL Central West (formerly, Central West Australian Football League) is an Australian rules football competition containing six clubs based in the Central West region of New South Wales, Australia.

All teams qualify for the finals in seniors.

== Clubs ==
=== Locations ===
Locations of the AFL Central West clubs

=== Current ===
Club	Colours	Nickname	Home ground	Former league	Est.	Years in CWAFL	CWAFL Senior Premierships	
Club	Colours	Nickname	Home ground	Former league	Est.	Years in CWAFL	Total	Years
Tier 1
Bathurst		Bushrangers	George Park, Bathurst	–	2004	2004-	10	2004, 2005, 2009, 2012, 2017, 2019, 2020, 2022, 2024, 2025
Bathurst		Giants	George Park 2, Bathurst	–	2014	2014-	1	2023
Dubbo		Demons	South Dubbo Oval, Dubbo	–	1981	1982-	4	1985, 2000, 2003, 2007
Orange		Tigers	Bloomfield Oval, Orange	–	1982	1982-	10	1983, 1991, 1992, 1998, 1999, 2002, 2013, 2014, 2015, 2018
Tier 2
Cowra		Blues	Mulyan Oval, Cowra	–	1982	1982-	7	1986, 1987, 2006, 2008, 2010, 2011, 2016
Parkes		Panthers	North Parkes Oval, Parkes	NRFNL	1980	1982-1990, 1997-	4	1988, 1989, 1990, 2001

=== Former ===
Club	Colours	Nickname	Home ground	Former league	Est.	Years in CWAFL	CWAFL Senior Premierships		Fate
Club	Colours	Nickname	Home ground	Former league	Est.	Years in CWAFL	Total	Years	Fate
Bathurst		Eagles	George Park, Bathurst	–	1982	1982-2003	5	1993, 1994, 1995, 1996, 1997	Merged with Charles Sturt University to form Bathurst Bushrangers following 2003 season
Charles Sturt University (CSU Mitchell 1998)		Bulldogs	Bathurst	–	1998	1998-2002	0	–	Merged with Bathurst to form Bathurst Bushrangers following 2003 season
Coonabarabran		Magpies	Coonabarabran	NWAFL	1993	1994	0	–	Folded after 1994 season
Dubbo Iguanas		Iguanas	South Dubbo Oval, Dubbo	–	2002	2002	0	–	Reserve grade only, folded after 2002 season
Forbes		Cats	Forbes	–	1982	1982-1986	0	–	Folded after 1986 season
Katoomba-Lithgow		Mountain Lions	Katoomba Falls Reserve, Katoomba	–	2003	2003	0	–	Only played invitation matches. Folded after 2003 season
Kelso		Crows	Kelso	–		?	0	–	Folded
Lithgow		Bombers	Lithgow	–	1987	1987-1994	0	–	Folded after 1994 season
Mudgee		Black Swans	Mudgee	–	2001	2001-2012	0	–	Folded after 2012 season
Young	(1982-?)(?-2016)	Saints	Miller-Henry Oval, Burrangong	NRFNL	1976	1982-2016	2	1982, 1984	Folded after 2016 season

== List of premiers ==
=== First-grade/Seniors/Tier 1 ===
Season	Premiers	Score (margin)	Minor premiers	Runners-up
1982	Young			
1983	Orange			
1984	Young			
1985	Dubbo			
1986	Cowra	20.16.136 – 11.10.76 (60 points)	Dubbo	Cowra
1987	Cowra	17.13.115 – 17.7.109 (6 points)	Orange	Orange
1988	Parkes	11.12.78 – 9.17.71 (7 points)	Bathurst Eagles	
1989	Parkes		Dubbo	
1990	Parkes	13.13.91 – 9.4.58 (33 points)	Dubbo	
1991	Orange	8.16.64 – 6.8.44 (20 points)	Dubbo	
1992	Orange	16.13.109 – 10.9.69 (40 points)	Dubbo	
1993	Bathurst Eagles	13.15.93 – 13.12.90 (3 points)	Orange	
1994	Bathurst Eagles	10-12.72 – 6.10.46 (26 points)	Dubbo	
1995	Bathurst Eagles		Orange	
1996	Bathurst Eagles		Orange	
1997	Bathurst Eagles		Orange	
1998	Orange		Bathurst Eagles	
1999	Orange		Dubbo	
2000	Dubbo	19.10.124 – 7.4.46 (78 points)	Parkes	
2001	Parkes	12.11.83 – 12.4.76 (7 points)	Bathurst Eagles	
2002	Orange	14.20.104 – 10.5.65 (39 points)	Dubbo	
2003	Dubbo	16.8.104 – 8.8.56 (48 points)	Cowra	
2004	Bathurst Bushrangers	23.22.160 – 5.8.38 (122 points)	Dubbo	
2005	Bathurst Bushrangers	17.20.122 – 11.10.76 (46 points)	Dubbo	
2006	Cowra	24.13.157 – 13.4.82 (75 points)	Bathurst Bushrangers	Cowra
2007	Dubbo	20.10.130 – 16.12.108 (22 points)	Bathurst Bushrangers	Dubbo
2008	Cowra	15.9.99 – 8.8.56 (43 points)	Bathurst Bushrangers	Cowra
2009	Bathurst Bushrangers	17.12.114 – 10.7.67 (47 points)	Cowra	
2010	Cowra	12.19.91 – 13.7.85 (6 points)	Bathurst Bushrangers	Cowra
2011	Cowra	18.13.121 – 9.7.61 (60 points)	Bathurst Bushrangers	Cowra
2012	Bathurst Bushrangers	14.6.90 – 9.11.65 (25 points)	Cowra	Bathurst Bushrangers
2013	Orange	14.8.92 – 13.11.89 (3 points)	Bathurst Bushrangers	Bathurst Bushrangers
2014	Orange	19.14.128 – 10.10.70 (58 points)	Bathurst Bushrangers	Orange Tigers
2015	Orange	10.11.71 – 10.8.68 (3 points)	Bathurst Bushrangers	Orange Tigers
2016	Cowra	10.11.71 – 7.12.54 (17 points)	Bathurst Bushrangers Outlaws	Bathurst Bushrangers Outlaws
2017	Bathurst Bushrangers Outlaws	13.11.89 – 7.9.51 (38 points)	Orange	Bathurst Bushrangers Rebels
2018	Orange	12.10.82 – 10.19.79 (3 points)	Bathurst Bushrangers Rebels	Orange Tigers
2019	Bathurst Bushrangers Rebels	9.15.69 – 5.9.39 (30 points)	Orange	Bathurst Bushrangers Rebels
2022	Bathurst Bushrangers	11.13 (79) – 10.8 (68) (11 points)	Bathurst Bushrangers	Bathurst Giants
2023	Bathurst Giants	16.17 (113) – 11.9 (75) (38 points)	Bathurst Giants	Bathurst Bushrangers
2024	Bathurst Bushrangers	24.11 (151) – 8.3 (51) (104 points)	Bathurst Giants	Bathurst Bushrangers
2025	Bathurst Bushrangers	14.12 (96) – 8.4 (52) (44 points)	Dubbo	Bathurst Bushrangers

=== Reserve-grade/Tier 2 ===
- 1984: Dubbo
- 1985: Dubbo
- 1986: Dubbo
- 1987: Cowra
- 1988: Lithgow
- 1992: Dubbo
- 1993: Orange
- 1994: Dubbo
- 1995: Bathurst Eagles
- 1996: Orange
- 1997: Parkes
- 1998: Kelso
- 1999: Parkes
- 2000: Dubbo
- 2001: Orange
- 2002: Dubbo
- 2003: Cowra
- 2004: Bathurst Bushrangers
- 2005: Mudgee
- 2006: Cowra
- 2007: Bathurst Bushrangers
- 2008: Cowra
- 2009: Bathurst Bushrangers
- 2010: Young
- 2011: Bathurst Bushrangers
- 2012: Orange
- 2013: Bathurst Bushrangers
- 2014: Bathurst Bushrangers
- 2015: Young
- 2020: Parkes
- 2021: Parkes
- 2022: Parkes
- 2023: Cowra
- 2024: Cowra
- 2025: Bathurst Bushrangers

=== Under 16s/17s/18s ===
- 1983: Young
- 1984: Orange
- 1985: Orange
- 1986: Orange
- 1987: Dubbo
- 1988: Parkes
- 1989: Parkes
- 1990: Parkes
- 1991: Cowra
- 1996: Parkes
- 1997: Parkes
- 1998: Kelso
- 1999: Parkes
- 2000: Parkes
- 2001: Cowra
- 2002: Bathurst Eagles
- 2003: Bathurst Eagles
- 2004: Bathurst Bushrangers
- 2005: Bathurst Bushrangers
- 2006: Bathurst Bushrangers
- 2007: Bathurst Bushrangers
- 2008: Bathurst Bushrangers
- 2009: Bathurst Bushrangers
- 2010: Dubbo
- 2011: Dubbo
- 2012: Dubbo
- 2013: Bathurst Bushrangers
- 2014: Bathurst Bushrangers
- 2015: Bathurst Bushrangers
- 2016: Bathurst Giants
- 2017: Bathurst Giants
- 2018: Bathurst Giants
- 2019: Orange
- 2020: Bathurst Giants
- 2021: Bathurst Giants
- 2022: Bathurst Giants
- 2023: Orange
- 2024: Bathurst Giants Charcoal
- 2025: Bathurst Giants

=== Under 13s/14s/15s ===
- 2000: Parkes
- 2001: Orange
- 2002: Orange
- 2003: Bathurst Eagles
- 2004: Bathurst Bushrangers
- 2005: Bathurst Bushrangers
- 2006: Bathurst Bushrangers
- 2007: Orange
- 2008: Dubbo
- 2009: Bathurst Bushrangers
- 2010: Bathurst Bushrangers
- 2011: Dubbo
- 2012: Young
- 2013: Bathurst Bushrangers
- 2014: Bathurst Giants
- 2015: Bathurst Giants
- 2016: Bathurst Giants
- 2017: Bathurst Giants
- 2018: Cowra
- 2019: Orange
- 2020: Bathurst Bushrangers
- 2022: Orange
- 2023: Bathurst Giants
- 2024: Orange
- 2025: Orange

=== Under 12s/11s ===
- 2011: Bathurst Bushrangers
- 2012: Bathurst Bushrangers
- 2013: Bathurst Bushrangers
- 2014: Orange
- 2015: Bathurst Giants
- 2016: Cowra
- 2017: Orange
- 2018: Cowra
- 2019: Cowra
- 2020: Orange
- 2022: Orange
- 2023: Orange
- 2024: Bathurst Giants
- 2025: Bathurst Giants

=== Women's ===
- 2015: Bathurst Bushrangers
- 2016: Bathurst Bushrangers
- 2017: Bathurst Bushrangers
- 2018: Dubbo
- 2019: Bathurst Giants
- 2022: Bathurst Giants
- 2023: Dubbo
- 2024: Dubbo
- 2025: Dubbo

=== Youth girls ===
- 2018: Orange
- 2019: Bathurst Giants
- 2022: Bathurst Bushrangers
- 2023: Orange
- 2024: Bathurst Bushrangers
- 2025: Bathurst Giants

== 2011 ladder ==
Central West AFL	Wins	Byes	Losses	Draws	For	Against	%	Pts	Final	Team	G	B	Pts	Team	G	B	Pts
Cowra	15	0	0	0	2214	604	366.56%	60	1st Semi	Bathurst	19	13	127	Parkes	8	6	54
Orange	11	0	4	0	1411	1107	127.46%	44	2nd Semi	Cowra	16	16	112	Orange	8	5	53
Bathurst	9	0	6	0	1648	1039	158.61%	36	Preliminary	Bathurst	17	21	123	Orange	12	8	80
Parkes	4	0	11	0	796	1412	56.37%	16	Grand	Cowra	18	13	121	Bathurst	9	7	61
Young	3	0	12	0	917	1725	53.16%	12									
Dubbo	3	0	12	0	706	1805	39.11%	12									

== 2012 ladder ==
Central West AFL	Wins	Byes	Losses	Draws	For	Against	%	Pts	Final	Team	G	B	Pts	Team	G	B	Pts
Bathurst	14	0	1	0	1697	714	237.68%	56	1st Semi	Orange	14	18	102	Parkes	9	10	64
Cowra	13	0	2	0	1596	864	184.72%	52	2nd Semi	Bathurst	16	6	102	Cowra	15	7	97
Orange	6	0	9	0	1251	1402	89.23%	24	Preliminary	Cowra	11	16	82	Orange	5	11	41
Parkes	5	0	10	0	1074	1222	87.89%	20	Grand	Bathurst	14	6	90	Cowra	9	11	65
Dubbo	5	0	10	0	1181	1350	87.48%	20									
Young	2	0	13	0	666	1913	34.81%	8									

== 2013 ladder ==
Central West AFL	Wins	Byes	Losses	Draws	For	Against	%	Pts	Final	Team	G	B	Pts	Team	G	B	Pts
Bathurst	15	0	0	0	2051	571	359.19%	60	1st Semi	Cowra	18	17	125	Dubbo	4	8	32
Orange	9	0	6	0	1687	1242	135.83%	36	2nd Semi	Bathurst	17	15	117	Orange	3	17	35
Cowra	3	0	12	0	948	1557	60.89%	12	Preliminary	Orange	16	12	108	Cowra	14	11	95
Dubbo	3	0	12	0	774	2090	37.03%	12	Grand	Orange	14	8	92	Bathurst	13	11	89

== See also ==
- AFL NSW/ACT
- Australian rules football in New South Wales
