= Anthony Daniher =

Australian rules footballer (born 1963)

Personal information
- Born: 21 January 1963 (age 63); West Wyalong, New South Wales
- Original teams: Ungarie (NRFNL); Turvey Park
- Height: 191 cm (6 ft 3 in)
- Weight: 90 kg (198 lb)
- Position: Full Back

Playing career^{1}
Years	Club	Games (Goals)
1981–1986	South Melbourne/Sydney	115 (62)
1987–1994	Essendon	118 (18)
Total		233 (80)
- ^{1} Playing statistics correct to the end of 1994.

Career highlights
- AFL: All-Australian 1991; New South Wales representative (4 games); NSW/ACT representative (1 game); Sydney Football Club: Sydney Best and Fairest runner-up 1985

Anthony Joseph Daniher (born 21 January 1963) is a former Australian rules footballer who played with the South Melbourne/Sydney and Essendon football clubs in the Australian Football League (AFL). Daniher's brothers, Terry, Neale and Chris, also played for Essendon in the AFL. He is the father of former Essendon and Brisbane Lions player Joe Daniher, who won a premiership at the latter club in his final game.

== Early life and childhood ==
Anthony Daniher was born the fourth child of James "Jim" Daniher and Edna Daniher (née Erwin) on 21 January 1963 at West Wyalong Base Hospital, in New South Wales. Daniher attended St Joseph's Catholic School in Ungarie for his primary education before going to Ungarie Central School until he finished year ten, after which he went to TAFE in Wagga Wagga.

It was during his childhood that Daniher showed his love for sport, namely Australian rules football, playing in the Northern Riverina Football League (NRFL) on Saturdays while playing rugby league at school carnivals. It was during his time in the NRFL that Daniher won several 'best and fairest' awards before he moved to Wagga Wagga for TAFE, where he would play for Turvey Park in the South West Football League. It was in 1980 that both the South Melbourne and Essendon football clubs approached Daniher for his signature. He eventually decided to play for South Melbourne, who were in the process of relocating to Sydney at the time.

== VFL/AFL career ==
From 1981 to 1994 Daniher played for South Melbourne/Sydney and Essendon in the VFL/AFL, playing 233 games and playing in the 1990 Grand Final with Essendon, which they lost to Collingwood. He also made history alongside his brothers when they became the first quartet of brothers to play for the same team in a State of Origin match and in a home-and-away game. It was after the 1994 season that Daniher retired as the last remaining player in the AFL to have played for South Melbourne.

== Retirement and beyond ==
Daniher's son, Darcy, was picked up by Essendon in 2007 under the father-son rule and made his debut for the Bombers on 4 May 2008. He played six games before retiring in 2011 due to persistent injuries. Another son, Joe, was picked up by Essendon in 2012 under the father-son rule and made his debut for the Bombers on Friday 7 June 2013. He would later make the All-Australian team in 2017, before moving to the Brisbane Lions and winning a Premiership in his final year in 2024.

== See also ==
- List of Australian rules football families
