= Neale Daniher =

Australian rules footballer (1961–2026)

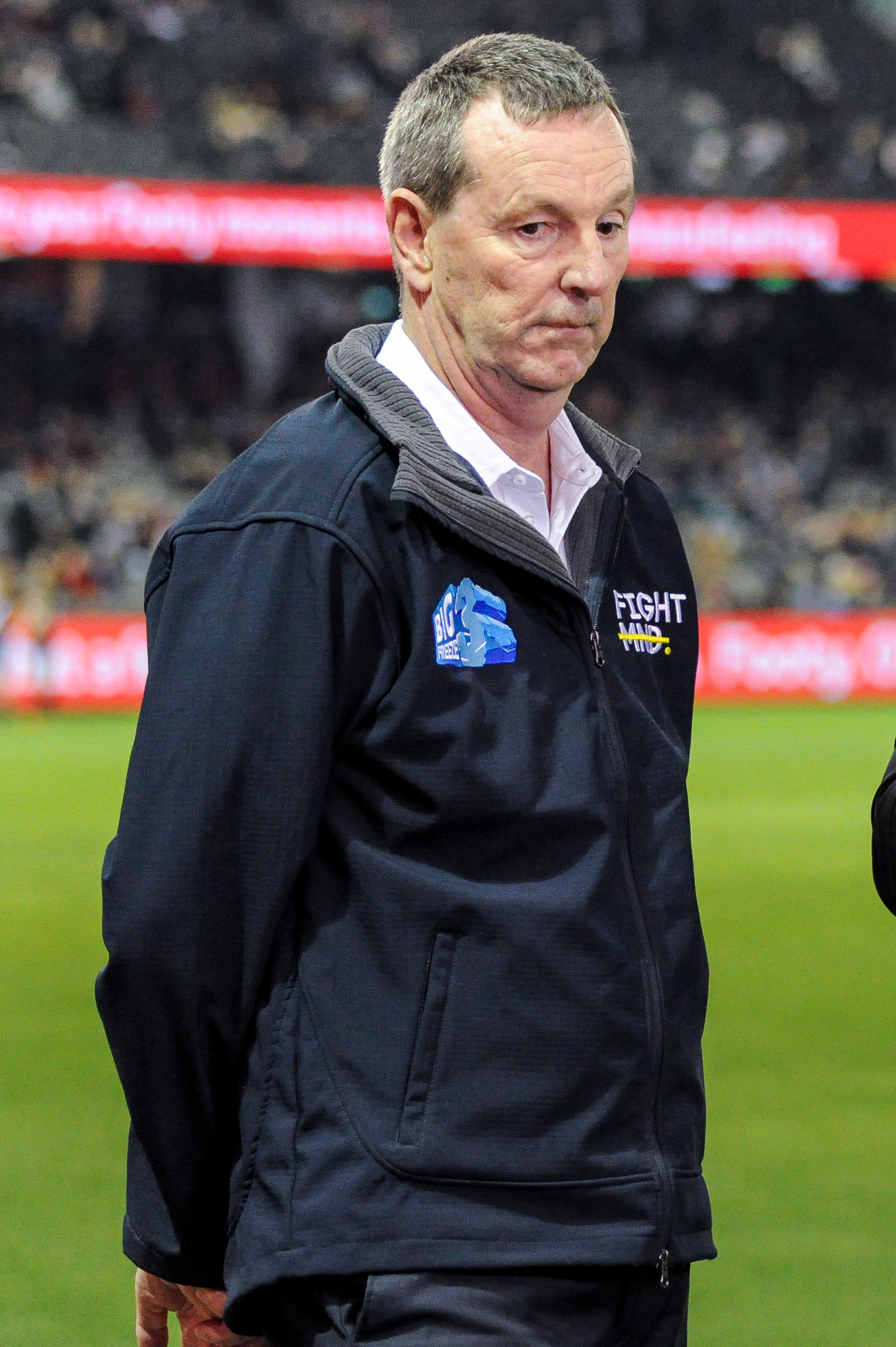
- Daniher in 2017

Personal information
- Full name: Neale Francis Daniher
- Nickname: The Reverend
- Born: 15 February 1961; West Wyalong, New South Wales, Australia
- Died: 25 May 2026 (aged 65); Melbourne, Victoria, Australia
- Original teams: Ungarie (NRFNL); Assumption College
- Height: 188 cm (6 ft 2 in)
- Weight: 84 kg (185 lb)
- Position: Half-back flank

Playing career
Years	Club	Games (Goals)
1979–1990	Essendon	82 (32)
Total		82 (32)

Coaching career
Years	Club	Games (W–L–D)
1998–2007	Melbourne	223 (108–114–1)

Career highlights
- VFL Recruit of the Year 1978; Victoria representative (2 games); New South Wales representative (1 game); Essendon Best and Fairest 1981; Essendon captain 1982

Neale Francis Daniher AO (15 February 1961 – 25 May 2026) was an Australian rules footballer who played with the Essendon Football Club in the Victorian Football League (VFL) / Australian Football League (AFL). He was later the coach of the Melbourne Football Club between 1998 and 2007 and also held coaching positions with Essendon, Fremantle and West Coast. His brothers Terry, Anthony and Chris also played for Essendon.

Daniher was diagnosed with motor neurone disease (MND) in 2013 and became a prominent campaigner for medical research and care for those living with the disease, co-founding the FightMND charity. His unrelenting advocacy resulted in numerous honours, including his appointment as an Officer of the Order of Australia (AO) and being named the 2019 Victorian of the Year and the 2025 Australian of the Year.

== Early life ==
Daniher was born the third of eleven children to James "Jim" and Edna Daniher (née Erwin) on 15 February 1961 at West Wyalong Base Hospital. He grew up in a Catholic family and attended St Joseph's Catholic School, Ungarie, for his primary education before going to St Patrick's College in Goulburn, and later Assumption College, Kilmore, where he finished Year 12. While at Assumption, he captained both the firsts football and cricket sides. He then went to RMIT University (Royal Melbourne Institute of Technology), where he learned about the emerging computer technology of the 1980s, obtaining a computer science degree.

He grew up playing in the Northern Riverina Football League (NRFL). In 1978, both the South Melbourne and Essendon football clubs approached Daniher. Following a legal dispute between the clubs, Essendon won the right to recruit him. South Melbourne had previously signed a contract granting Essendon this option, stemming from the trade of his brother Terry to Essendon in exchange for Neville Fields.

== Playing career ==
=== Essendon ===
From 1979 to 1990, Daniher played for Essendon in the VFL/AFL. His playing career was severely hampered by injury; he underwent three knee reconstructions on his right knee and was restricted to just 82 games over an 11-year period. He was appointed captain in 1982 but never led the side due to his injuries.

On 1 September 1990, Daniher and his three brothers made history by becoming the first and only quartet of brothers to play for the same team in a single VFL/AFL game.

On 22 May 1990, the brothers also played together in a State of Origin match for New South Wales against Victoria.

Daniher retired from the AFL at the end of the 1990 season, but he subsequently played for the Werribee Football Club in the Victorian Football Association (VFA) in 1991.

== Coaching career ==
=== Essendon assistant coach (1992–1994) ===
After his playing career concluded, Daniher began a career in coaching. His first role was as an assistant coach at the Essendon Football Club under senior coach Kevin Sheedy. He remained in the position from 1992 to 1994, a period that included the club's 1993 premiership victory.

=== Fremantle assistant coach (1995–1997) ===
Daniher joined the Fremantle Football Club as an assistant coach under senior coach Gerard Neesham for their inaugural 1995 season, serving in the role until the end of 1997.

=== Melbourne senior coach (1998–2007) ===
Following his stint with Fremantle, Daniher was appointed senior coach of the Melbourne Football Club ahead of the 1998 season. He replaced caretaker senior coach Greg Hutchison, who had stepped in after Neil Balme was sacked midway through the 1997 season. Daniher would go on to coach Melbourne for 10 seasons.

In his first year in charge during the 1998 season, Daniher guided Melbourne to a fourth-place finish on the ladder with a 14–8 record. However, they were eliminated by eventual runners-up North Melbourne in the preliminary final.

The 1999 season proved disappointing; the Demons fell to 14th position on the ladder, managing just six wins and 16 losses.

In the 2000 season, his third at the club, Daniher led Melbourne to the 2000 AFL Grand Final against his former team as a player, Essendon. Melbourne lost the match by 60 points, with a final score of 19.21 (135) to 11.9 (75), albeit the Essendon side had only lost one game for the entire year and were formidable favourites.

Failing to capitalize on their Grand Final appearance, Melbourne slipped out of the top eight in the 2001 season, finishing 11th with a 10–12 record.

In the 2002 season, the Demons returned to the finals. They defeated North Melbourne in an elimination final at the MCG before being knocked out by the Adelaide Crows in the semi-final.

The club dropped back down the ladder in the 2003 season, finishing 14th with only five wins for the year. A nine-game losing streak to close out the season placed Daniher's coaching position under heavy scrutiny.

In 2004, amid Melbourne's on- and off-field struggles, which included low membership and a reliance on the Competitive Balance Fund, Daniher became more outspoken in the media. His "preaching" style during this period earned him the nickname "The Reverend". This approach helped boost the club's membership and public profile, aided by a semi-final appearance in the pre-season Wizard Cup. Translating this form into the 2004 season, Melbourne won 14 of their first 18 games to lead the AFL ladder. However, a late four-game losing streak saw them drop to fifth, and they were eliminated in the first week of finals by Essendon.

The 2005 season saw the Demons enjoy a similar run near the top of the ladder before another late-season fade-out temporarily pushed them out of the eight. Close wins over the Western Bulldogs and Geelong secured seventh place, though they were comprehensively beaten by Geelong in the elimination final, marking a second consecutive first-week finals exit.

The club improved in the 2006 season. Despite losing the first three games of the year, Melbourne finished seventh and eliminated St Kilda in the first week of finals, before falling to Fremantle in the semi-finals.

In the 2007 season, Melbourne started the year with nine straight defeats. They won their next two matches, but a poor showing in a 49-point loss against bottom-ranked Richmond in round 12 left them sitting 15th on the ladder, intensifying the pressure on Daniher. On 27 June 2007, he announced he would resign at the end of the season. Two days later, he brought forward his departure, declaring the round 13 clash against Essendon would be his last. Melbourne lost the game by two points. Daniher was replaced by assistant coach Mark Riley as caretaker senior coach for the remainder of the 2007 AFL season.

== Post-coaching career ==
=== West Coast general manager of football operations (2008–2013) ===
After concluding his coaching career, Daniher served as the general manager of football operations for the West Coast Eagles, beginning in the 2008 season. In September 2013, he stood down from the role for health reasons, keeping his condition private until August 2014.

== Illness and death ==
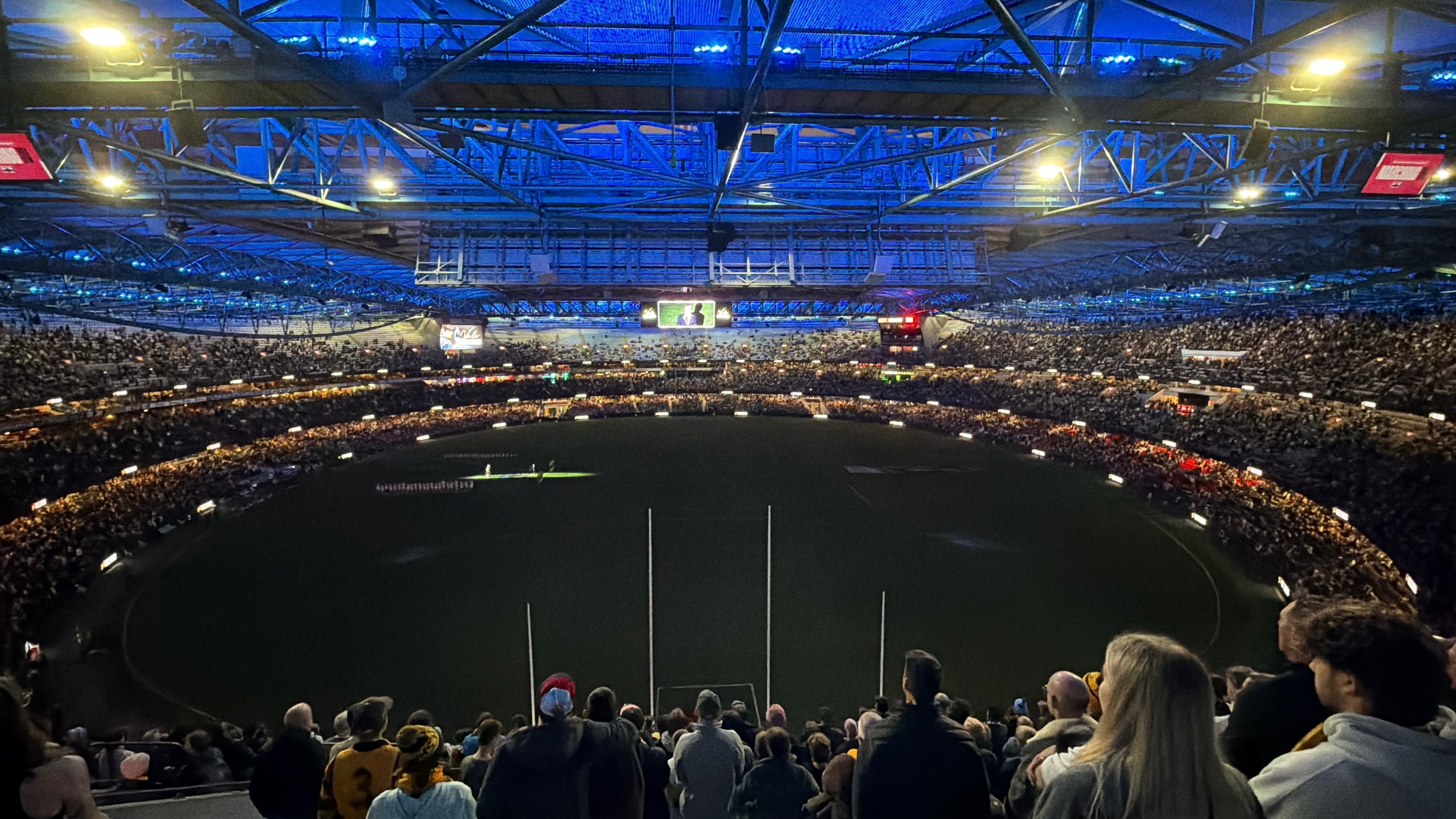
Tribute to Daniher at the St Kilda–Hawthorn AFL match on 28 May 2026

Daniher was diagnosed with motor neurone disease (MND) in 2013, with the diagnosis made public the following year. He became a prominent advocate for motor neurone disease awareness and research, and was the co-founder and patron of the charity FightMND. The organisation raises funds for research and care through major events, direct donations, and the sale of merchandise, most notably blue-and-grey beanies. Since 2015, the annual King's Birthday match between Melbourne and Collingwood has partnered with FightMND's Big Freeze campaign as a fundraiser for MND research. The Neale Daniher Trophy, awarded to the match's best player, is named in his honour.

Daniher died on 25 May 2026, aged 65. Following his death, landmarks across Melbourne were lit in light blue, including the MCG, Flinders Street Station, the CityLink tunnel, Bolte Bridge, and the Arts Centre Melbourne spire.

On 10 June 2026, Daniher was honoured at a state funeral at the MCG. The service was attended by 1,000 people, including the prime minister Anthony Albanese, the Victorian premier Jacinta Allan, and Craig Drummond, the chair of the AFL.

== Honours ==
Daniher was appointed a Member of the Order of Australia (AM) in the 2016 Queen's Birthday Honours list for his efforts in raising awareness of MND and raising funds to help find a cure for the disease. He helped FightMND raise more than A$140 million, with more than A$117 million directly invested into research and care. He was promoted to Officer of the Order of Australia (AO) in the 2021 Queen's Birthday Honours for "distinguished service to people with Motor Neurone Disease and their families through advocacy, public education and fundraising initiatives".

In 2025, Daniher was named Australian of the Year in recognition of his fundraising and determination in fighting MND.

== See also ==
- List of Australian rules football families
