= Darcy Daniher =

Australian rules footballer

Personal information
- Born: 21 September 1989 (age 37); Melbourne, Victoria
- Original team: Aberfeldie / Calder Cannons
- Draft: No. 39 (F/S), 2007 National Draft, Essendon
- Height: 191 cm (6 ft 3 in)
- Weight: 93 kg (205 lb)

Playing career^{1}
Years	Club	Games (Goals)
2008–2011	Essendon	6 (0)
- ^{1} Playing statistics correct to the end of 2009.

Darcy Daniher (born 21 September 1989) is a former Australian rules footballer drafted by the Essendon Football Club at pick 39 under the father–son rule in the 2007 AFL draft. Daniher was a mid-sized, mobile defender originally from TAC Cup club Calder Cannons. He retired from professional football in August 2011 due to injury.

== Draft ==
Daniher was recruited from Calder Cannons in the 2007 National Draft. He was selected by the Essendon Football Club with its third round selection (39th overall) as a father–son recruit in recognition of his father, Anthony Daniher, who played 118 games for Essendon. Prior to the 2007 National Draft, the Sydney, Geelong and North Melbourne Football Clubs had shown interest in recruiting him.

== AFL career ==
Darcy made his AFL debut on 4 May 2008 against Port Adelaide at the Telstra Dome (now known as Marvel Stadium) and played in the next two games before an injury ended his season. He played three games in 2009 before being injured again. Daniher retired from professional football in August 2011 due to ongoing groin problems.
