= Chris Daniher =

Australian rules footballer (born 1966)

Personal information
- Born: 31 March 1966 (age 60); West Wyalong, New South Wales
- Original teams: Ungarie (NRFNL); Ariah Park-Mirrool (RFNL); Coolamon (RFNL)
- Height: 183 cm (6 ft 0 in)
- Weight: 86 kg (190 lb)
- Position: Utility

Playing career^{1}
Years	Club	Games (Goals)
1987–1997	Essendon	124 (40)
- ^{1} Playing statistics correct to the end of 1997.

Career highlights
- AFL: New South Wales representative (3 games); NSW/ACT representative (1 game); Essendon Football Club: Essendon Premiership Team 1993

Christopher James Daniher (born 31 March 1966) is a former Australian rules footballer who played with the Essendon Football Club in the Australian Football League (AFL). His brothers Terry, Neale and Anthony also played for Essendon in the AFL.

== Early life and childhood ==
Chris was born the sixth of eleven children of James "Jim" Daniher and Edna Daniher (née Erwin) on 31 March 1966 at West Wyalong Base Hospital. Chris attended St Joseph's Catholic School, Ungarie for his primary education before going to Ungarie Central School until year ten, after which he became a farmer.

It was during his childhood that Chris showed his love for sport, namely Australian rules football, playing in the Northern Riverina Football League (NRFL) on Saturdays while playing rugby league at school carnivals. It was during his time in the NRFL that Chris won many best & fairest awards before he tore his anterior cruciate ligament in December 1984. After Chris recovered from this injury, he played for Ariah Park-Mirrool and later Coolamon in the Riverina Football League before he was approached by the Essendon Football Club to play for them in 1986.

== VFL/AFL career ==
From 1987 to 1997 Chris played for Essendon in the VFL/AFL, playing 124 games and playing in the 1990 and 1993 Grand Finals, the latter of which he won. He also made history alongside his brothers when they became the first quartet of brothers to play for the same team in a State of Origin match and in a home-and-away game. It was after the 1997 season that Chris retired.

== Statistics ==
Legend
G	Goals	K	Kicks	D	Disposals	T	Tackles
B	Behinds	H	Handballs	M	Marks

Season	Team	No.	Games	Totals							Averages (per game)							Votes
Season	Team	No.	Games	G	B	K	H	D	M	T	G	B	K	H	D	M	T	Votes
1987	Essendon	7	2	0	1	5	8	13	5	3	0.0	0.5	2.5	4.0	6.5	2.5	1.5	0
1988	Essendon	7	2	1	0	16	6	22	8	4	0.5	0.0	8.0	3.0	11.0	4.0	2.0	0
1989	Essendon	7	3	1	2	24	7	31	9	2	0.3	0.7	8.0	2.3	10.3	3.0	0.7	0
1990	Essendon	7	5	1	0	41	24	65	11	19	0.2	0.0	8.2	4.8	13.0	2.2	3.8	0
1991	Essendon	7	9	1	2	69	79	148	15	30	0.1	0.2	7.7	8.8	16.4	1.7	3.3	0
1992	Essendon	7	19	10	5	189	148	337	85	49	0.5	0.3	9.9	7.8	17.7	4.5	2.6	3
1993†	Essendon	7	15	1	3	136	118	254	64	20	0.1	0.2	9.1	7.9	16.9	4.3	1.3	0
1994	Essendon	7	12	2	1	99	62	161	54	12	0.2	0.1	8.3	5.2	13.4	4.5	1.0	0
1995	Essendon	7	21	6	10	137	103	240	69	28	0.3	0.5	6.5	4.9	11.4	3.3	1.3	0
1996	Essendon	7	19	13	6	172	108	280	85	34	0.7	0.3	9.1	5.7	14.7	4.5	1.8	1
1997	Essendon	7	17	4	4	137	103	240	62	34	0.2	0.2	8.1	6.1	14.1	3.6	2.0	3
Career			124	40	34	1025	766	1791	467	235	0.3	0.3	8.3	6.2	14.4	3.8	1.9	7

== Retirement and beyond ==
Shortly after retiring, Chris decided to return to Ungarie to become a farmer. After returning, Chris was approached by several clubs in the Riverina Football League (RFL) to play for them. Chris eventually decided to play with Temora for the 1998 and 1999 seasons.

After the 1999 season, Chris decided to play with Ungarie, which would award him with NRFL premierships in 2000 and 2001, as well as four NRFL and eight Ungarie best & fairest awards.

== See also ==
- List of Australian rules football families
