= Terry Daniher =

Australian rules footballer (born 1957)

Personal information
- Born: 15 August 1957 (age 69); West Wyalong, New South Wales
- Original teams: Ungarie (NRFNL); Ariah Park-Mirrool
- Height: 188 cm (6 ft 2 in)
- Weight: 89 kg (196 lb)
- Position: Centre half forward/centre half back

Playing career^{1}
| Years | Club | Games (Goals) |
| 1976–1977 | South Melbourne | 19 (22) |
| 1978–1992 | Essendon | 294 (447) |
| Total | | 313 (469) |

Representative team honours
| Years | Team | Games (Goals) |
| | Victoria | 11 (12) |
| | New South Wales | 4 (6) |
- ^{1} Playing statistics correct to the end of 1992.

Career highlights
- Northern Riverina FL Evans Medal: 1974; VFL Premiership: 1984, 1985; VFLPA MVP (Leigh Matthews Trophy): 1983; 3x All-Australian Team: 1983, 1985, 1988; All-Australian Team Captain: 1985; Essendon Best & Fairest: 1982; 2x Essendon leading Goal Kicker: 1979, 1983; Essendon Captain: 1983–1988; Wagga Tigers Premiership Captain/Coach: 1993, 1994, 1995, 1997, 1998.; Australian Football Hall of Fame; Essendon Team of the Century: (Half forward flank)

Terrence "Terry" John Daniher (born 15 August 1957) is a former Australian rules footballer best known for his career with Essendon Football Clubs in the Australian Football League (AFL) where he was a dual-premiership player. A New South Welshman hailing from the town of Ungarie, he captained his state in State of Origin during the 1980s and prior to the introduction of State of Origin rules was a key member of the Victorian state side and was 3 time All-Australian representing Australia in International Rules in 1990. Daniher played 19 games for South Melbourne before joining Essendon and was also an assistant coach for the Essendon, Collingwood, St Kilda and Carlton Football Clubs.

Terry is a member of the Australian Football Hall of Fame and the Riverina Sporting Hall of Fame and is a Champion of Essendon.

Terry is a member of the Daniher brothers, a football family who simultaneously played for Essendon, including his brothers Neale, Anthony and Chris.

== Early life and childhood ==
Terry was born the first child of James "Jim" Daniher and Edna Daniher (née Erwin) on 15 August 1957 at West Wyalong Base Hospital. Terry attended St Joseph's Catholic School, Ungarie for his primary education before going to Ungarie Central School until year ten, after which he became a farmer.

It was during his childhood that Terry showed his love for sport, namely Australian rules football, playing in the Northern Riverina Football League (NRFL) on Saturdays while playing rugby league at school carnivals. It was during his time in the NRFL that Terry won several best & fairest award, including the senior football Evans Medal in 1974, before playing with Ariah Park-Mirrool in the South West Football League (New South Wales) for the 1975 season. It was during this season that Terry was approached by the South Melbourne Football Club to play for them.

== VFL/AFL playing career ==
From 1976 to 1992 Terry played for South Melbourne and Essendon in the VFL/AFL, playing 313 games and playing in the 1983, 1984, 1985 and 1990 Grand Finals, two of which his side won. He also made history alongside his brothers when they became the first quartet of brothers to play for the same team in a State of Origin match and in a home-and-away game. It was after the 1992 season that Terry retired.

== Retirement, coaching and beyond ==
After his professional career, Terry returned to the Riverina to play for the Wagga Tigers in the Riverina Football League (RFL), becoming Captain-Coach and leading the Tigers to five premierships out of six Grand Finals.

After this he returned to Melbourne to become an assistant coach for Essendon, coaching a reserves premiership in 1999, and serving as assistant coach of the team that won the 2000 Grand Final. In 2003, Terry became an assistant coach for the Collingwood Football Club before becoming an assistant coach for the St Kilda Football Club, where he would stay from 2004 to 2005. Terry got his final coaching job when he became an assistant coach for the Carlton Football Club, where he stayed from 2006 to 2007. After this, Terry begun his own cleaning business, Terry Daniher Cleaning Services.

== Champions of Essendon ==
In 2002 an Essendon panel ranked him at 11 in their Champions of Essendon list of the 25 greatest players ever to have played for Essendon.

== See also ==
- List of Australian rules football families
