= Riverina Football Netball League =

Sports league in New South Wales, Australia

- Sport: Australian rules football
- First season: 1982
- No. of teams: 9
- Country: Australia
- Most recent champion: Collingullie-Wagga (5) (2025)
- Most titles: GGGM Lions (11); Wagga Tigers (11)
- Website: AFL Riverina Official Website

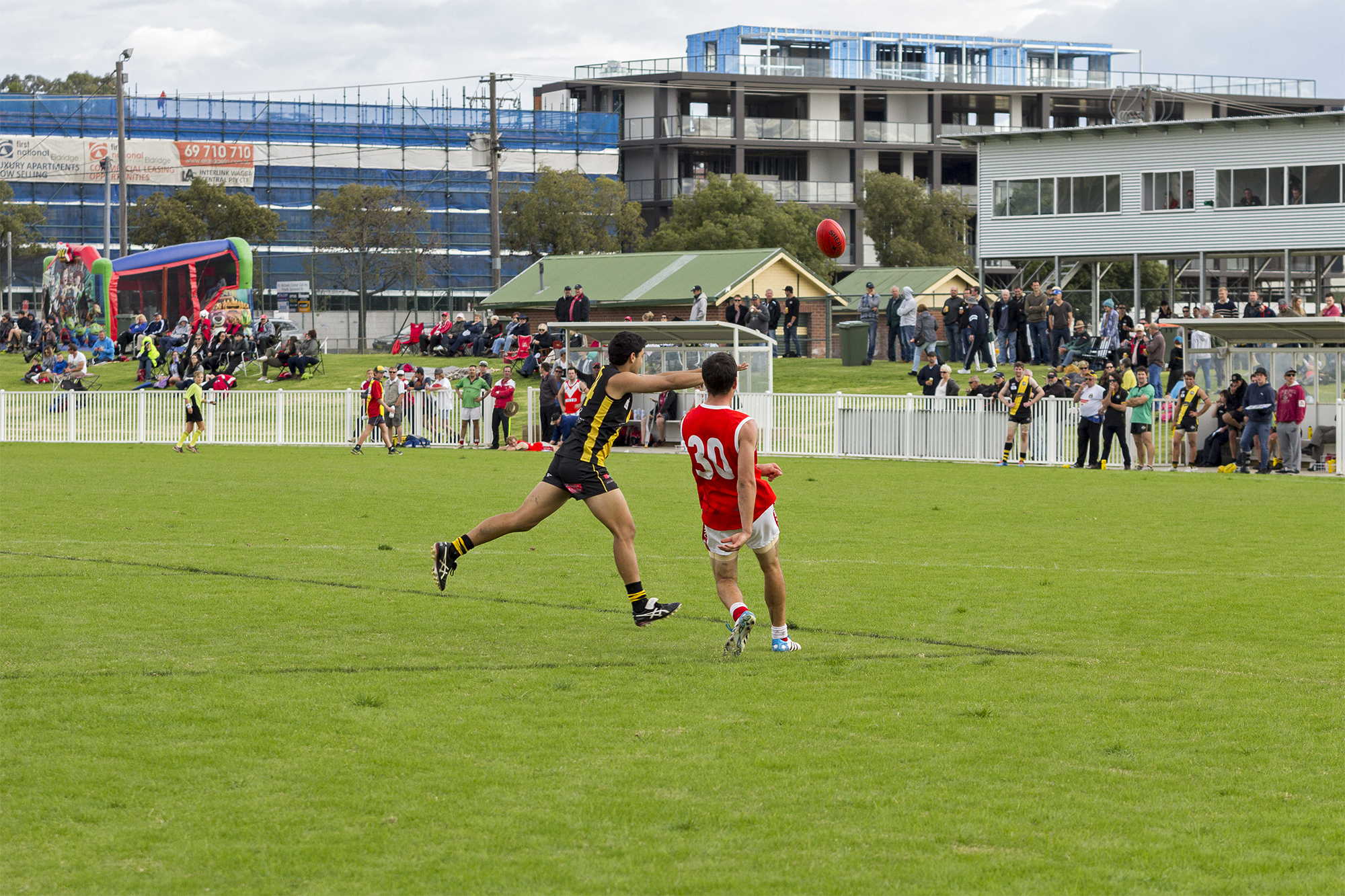
Wagga Tigers vs Collingullie at Robertson Oval in 2015

The Riverina Football Netball League (RFNL) is an Australian rules football and netball competition containing nine clubs based in the Riverina region of New South Wales, Australia. The league features three grades in the Australian rules football competition, with these being First-Grade, Reserve-Grade and Under 17s. In the netball competition, there are five grades, with these being A-Grade, A Reserve-Grade, B-Grade, C-Grade and Under 17s. Governed by AFL Riverina, the league is the only major country league in New South Wales, and was formerly a VFL recruiting zone for South Melbourne from 1968 to 1986.

Currently a home and away season consisting of eighteen rounds is played. The best five teams then play off according to the McIntyre system, culminating in the RFNL Grand Final, which is traditionally hosted by Narrandera.

== History ==
The Riverina Football League was formed in 1982 when the South West Football League (New South Wales), the Central Riverina Football League and the Farrer Football League amalgamated in order to create the Riverina Football League and the Riverina District Football League, with the latter changing its name to the Farrer Football League in 1985.

== Clubs ==
=== Locations ===
Locations of the Riverina FNL clubs.

=== Current ===
Club	Colours	Nickname	Home Ground	Former League	Est.	Years in RFNL	RFNL Senior Premierships	
Club	Colours	Nickname	Home Ground	Former League	Est.	Years in RFNL	Total	Years
Collingullie-Wagga (Collingullie-Ashmont-Kapooka 2011–15; Collingullie-Glenfield Park 2015–23)		Demons	Crossroads Oval, Collingullie	FFL	1998	2011–	5	2014, 2015, 2018, 2024, 2025
Coolamon Rovers		Grasshoppers	Kindra Park, Coolamon	SWDFL	1894	1982–	4	1983, 2000, 2013, 2026
Ganmain-Grong Grong-Matong		Lions	Ganmain Sports Ground, Ganmain	–	1982	1982–	12	1984, 1991, 1992, 1996, 2004, 2005, 2006, 2008, 2009, 2010, 2011, 2022
Griffith		Swans	Griffith Exies Oval, Griffith	SWDFL	1914	1982–	1	2003
Leeton-Whitton		Crows	Leeton Showgrounds, Leeton	–	1995	1995–	1	2017
Mangoplah-Cookardinia United-Eastlakes		Goannas	Mangoplah Sports Ground, Mangoplah	FFL	1955	1995–	0	–
Narrandera Imperial		Eagles	Narrandera Sportsground, Narrandera	SWDFL	1910	1982–	2	1986, 2012
Turvey Park		Bulldogs	Maher Oval, Glenfield Park	SWDFL	1954	1982–	6	1987, 1988, 1989, 1990, 2002, 2023
Wagga		Tigers	Robertson Oval, Wagga Wagga	FFL, AFLC	1928	1982–2001; 2007–	12	1985, 1993, 1994, 1995, 1997, 1998, 1999, 2001, 2007, 2016, 2019, 2020

=== Former ===
Club	Colours	Nickname	Home Ground	Former League	Est.	Years in RFNL	RFNL Senior Premierships		Fate
Club	Colours	Nickname	Home Ground	Former League	Est.	Years in RFNL	Total	Years	Fate
Ardlethan		Stars	Ardlethan Sports Ground, Ardlethan	SWDFL	1907	1982–1986	0	–	Moved to Farrer FL following 1986 season
Ariah Park-Mirrool		Brown Bombers	Ariah Park Recreation Reserve, Ariah Park	SWDFL	1953	1982–1990	0	–	Moved to Farrer FL following 1990 season
Barellan United		Kangaroos	Barellan Recreation Ground, Barellan	CRFL	1970	1982	0	–	Moved to Farrer FL following 1982 season
Collingullie-Ashmont		Demons	Crossroads Oval, Collingullie	FFL	1980	1995–1997	0	–	Merged with Uranquinty-Kapooka to form Collingullie-Ashmont-Kapooka in Farrer FL following 1997 season
East Wagga-Kooringal		Hawks	Gumly Oval, Gumly Gumly	FFL	1946	1982–2009	1	1982	Moved to Farrer FL following 2009 season
Leeton		Redlegs	Leeton Showgrounds, Leeton	SWDFL	1912	1982–1994	0	–	Merged with Whitton-Yanco to form Leeton-Whitton following 1994 season
North Wagga		Saints	McPherson Oval, North Wagga Wagga	FFL	1957	1982, 1995–1997, 2008–2009	0	–	Returned to Farrer FL following 1982, 1997 and 2009 seasons
Osborne		Ostriches	Osborne Recreation Reserve, Osborne	HFNL	1901	2020	0	–	Returned to Hume FNL following 2020 season
Temora		Kangaroos	Nixon Park, Temora	FFL	1949	1995–2001	0	–	Returned to Farrer FL following 2001 season

== Season structure ==
=== Pre-season ===
The Riverina Football League like most country leagues does not have a formal Pre-season competition. As part of their Pre-season preparation clubs will often schedule between one and two practice matches with clubs from other leagues prior to the season beginning. These matches could take on different structures and were primarily conducted on a non-official basis with limited match officials and scores not being recorded.

=== Premiership season ===
The Riverina home-and-away season at present lasts for 18 rounds for a total of 16 matches and 2 byes per team. The season starts in mid April and ends in late August. Each team plays each other team twice – once at home and once away. Teams receive four premiership points for a win or bye and two premiership points for a draw. Ladder finishing positions are based on the number of premiership points won, and "percentage" (calculated as the ratio of points scored to points conceded throughout the season) is used as a tie-breaker when teams finish with equal premiership points.

=== Finals series ===
The Riverina football finals consisted of a 'Top-5' finals system.

The winning team receives a silver premiership cup, a premiership flag – a new one of each is manufactured each year. The flag has been presented since the league began and is traditionally unfurled at the team's first home game of the following season. Additionally, each player in the grand final-winning team receives a premiership medallion.

Due to the COVID-19 pandemic during the 2020 season a number of clubs did not participate. The remaining clubs took part in a six-round season and a 'Top-4' finals structure.

=== Finals structure ===
==== 2024 Finals Series ====
Qualifying and elimination finals
2	Collingullie-Wagga	17.8 (110)
3	MCUE Goannas	7.4 (46)
4	Coolamon	15.10 (100)
5	Griffith Swans	7.9 (51)

Major Semi-final
1	GGGM Lions	9.10 (64)
Collingullie-Wagga	7.8 (50)
Minor Semi-final
MCUE Goannas	6.11 (47)
Coolamon	10.9 (69)

Preliminary final
Collingullie-Wagga	12.13 (85)
Coolamon	8.5 (53)

Grand Final
GGGM Lions	5.12 (42)
Collingullie-Wagga	7.6 (48)

== Notable players ==
The following footballers went onto play senior VFL football from the following clubs / leagues with the year indicating their VFL debut.

South West Football League (New South Wales) (1910–1981)

- 1925: Joseph Plant – Narrandera to Richmond
- 1925: Les Stainsby – Coolamon to Collingwood
- 1928: Jack Haw – Leeton to Melbourne
- 1931: Geoff Neil – Leeton to St. Kilda
- 1933: George Schlitz – Leeton to St. Kilda
- 1934: George Pattison – Narrandera to Essendon
- 1936: Percy Bushby – Narrandrea to Essendon
- 1948: Laurie Carroll – Ganmain to St. Kilda
- 1948: Dudley Mattingly – Ganmain to St. Kilda
- 1955: Peter Curtis – Coolamon, Griffith to North Melbourne
- 1957: Tom Quade – Ariah Park Mirrool to North Melbourne
- 1958: Bill Box – Whitton to Essendon
- 1960: Des Lyons – Leeton to Carlton
- 1961: Jim Carroll – Ganmain to Carlton
- 1961: Tom Carroll – Ganmain to Carlton
- 1966: Mike Quade – Ariah Park Mirrool to North Melbourne
- 1968: Ross Elwin – Leeton to South Melbourne
- 1968: Bruce Reid – Leeton to South Melbourne
- 1970: Frank Gumbleton – Ganmain to North Melbourne
- 1970: Ricky Quade – Ariah Park Mirrool to South Melbourne
- 1971: Jim Prentice – Ariah Park Mirrool to South Melbourne
- 1975: Rod Coelli – Ardlethan to South Melbourne
- 1975: Terry O'Neil – Narrandera to South Melbourne
- 1976: Terry Daniher – Ariah Park Mirrool to South Melbourne
- 1977: Wayne Evans – Grong Grong Matong to South Melbourne
- 1978: Russell Campbell – Gainmain to South Melbourne
- 1979: Wayne Carroll – Ganmain to South Melbourne
- 1979: John Durnan – Narrandera to Geelong
- 1979: Mark Fraser – Turvey Park to South Melbourne
- 1979: Max Kruse – Leeton to South Melbourne
- 1980: Stephen Eather – Turvey Park to South Melbourne
- 1980: Victor Hugo – Narrandera to South Melbourne
- 1980: Greg Smith – Ardlethan to South Melbourne
- 1981: Dennis Carroll – Ganmain to South Melbourne
- 1981: Anthony Daniher – Turvey Park to South Melbourne
- 1981: Jack Lucas – Ariah Park Mirrool to South Melbourne

Riverina Football League (1982–2023)

- 1984 – David Murphy (Turvey Park)
- 1984 – Paul Hawke (Wagga Tigers)
- 1987 – Chris Daniher (Ariah Park-Mirrool & Coolamon)
- 1987 – Matt Lloyd (Mangoplah-Cookardinia United-Eastlakes)
- 1987 – Peter Quirk (Narrandera)
- 1989 – Wayne Carey (North Wagga)
- 1990 – Paul Kelly (Wagga Tigers)
- 1992 – Jason Mooney (Turvey Park)
- 1993 – Mark Pitura (Turvey Park)
- 1994 – Daniel McPherson (Ganmain-Grong Grong-Matong)
- 1994 – Brad Seymour (Wagga Tigers)
- 1999 – Cameron Mooney (Turvey Park)
- 2000 – Ben Fixter (Wagga Tigers & Coolamon)
- 2007 – Matt Suckling (East Wagga-Kooringal and Wagga Tigers)
- 2011 – Isaac Smith (Temora, East Wagga-Kooringal and Wagga Tigers)
- 2012 – Kurt Aylett (Leeton-Whitton)
- 2012 – Harry Cunningham (Turvey Park)
- 2012 – Orren Stephenson (Mangoplah-Cookardinia United-Eastlakes)
- 2012 – Jacob Townsend (Leeton-Whitton)
- 2013 – Zac Williams (Narrandera)
- 2015 – Dougal Howard (East Wagga-Kooringal and Wagga Tigers)
- 2016 – Harrison Himmelberg (Mangoplah-Cookardinia United-Eastlakes)
- 2016 – Jacob Hopper (Leeton-Whitton)
- 2016 – Matthew Kennedy (Collingullie-Glenfield Park)
- 2017 – Harry Perryman (Collingullie-Glenfield Park)
- 2021 – Matthew Flynn (Narrandera)
- 2021 – Cooper Sharman (Leeton-Whitton)
- 2026 – Rasgur Mann (Narrandera)

Wagga United Football Association

- 1899 – Harry Lampe (Wagga Wagga)
- 1924 – Alby Anderson – Royal Stars

Riverina Main Line Football Association

- 1923 – Tim Archer – Mangoplah

Wagga Australian Rules Football Association

- 1929 – Bill Mohr (Wagga Tigers)

Footballers from the Riverina Football League who were drafted AFL, but did not play senior AFL football include:

- Jock Cornell – Geelong: (Mangoplah-Cookardinia United-Eastlakes)
- Max King – Melbourne: (Wagga Tigers)

== Premiers ==
=== First-Grade ===
Season	Grand Final Information			Minor Premiers
Season	Premiers	Score (Margin)	Runners-Up	Minor Premiers
1982	East Wagga-Kooringal	12.8.80 – 10.15.75 (5 points)	Coolamon	Ariah Park-Mirrool
1983	Coolamon	23.11.149 – 16.12.108 (41 points)	East Wagga-Kooringal	Coolamon
1984	Ganmain-Grong Grong-Matong	17.12.114 – 16.12.108 (6 points)	Ariah Park-Mirrool	Ariah Park-Mirrool
1985	Wagga Tigers	(drawn grand final)	Coolamon	Ganmain-Grong Grong-Matong
1985	Wagga Tigers	19.19.133 – 17.13.115 (18 points. grand final replay)	Coolamon	Ganmain-Grong Grong-Matong
1986	Narrandera	19.7.121 – 9.13.67 (54 points)	Ganmain-Grong Grong-Matong	Ganmain-Grong Grong-Matong
1987	Turvey Park	17.5.107 – 14.21.105 (2 points)	Wagga Tigers	Turvey Park
1988	Turvey Park	19.19.133 – 12.7.79 (54 points)	Coolamon	Wagga Tigers
1989	Turvey Park	14.15.99 – 10.12.72 (27 points)	Wagga Tigers	Turvey Park
1990	Turvey Park	14.21.105 – 13.6.84 (21 points)	Wagga Tigers	Turvey Park
1991	Ganmain-Grong Grong-Matong	16.10.106 – 10.8.68 (38 points)	Griffith	Ganmain-Grong Grong-Matong
1992	Ganmain-Grong Grong-Matong	13.9.87 – 13.8.86 (1 point)	Turvey Park	Wagga Tigers
1993	Wagga Tigers	23.9.147 – 14.15.99 (48 points)	Turvey Park	Wagga Tigers
1994	Wagga Tigers	18.10.118 – 8.8.56 (62 points)	Turvey Park	Ganmain-Grong Grong-Matong
1995	Wagga Tigers	15.7.97 – 12.13.85 (12 points)	Turvey Park	Turvey Park
1996	Ganmain-Grong Grong-Matong	18.13.121 – 9.10.64 (57 points)	Wagga Tigers	Wagga Tigers
1997	Wagga Tigers	17.13.115 – 8.7.55 (60 points)	Ganmain-Grong Grong-Matong	Turvey Park
1998	Wagga Tigers	13.9.87 – 12.11.83 (4 points)	Turvey Park	Wagga Tigers
1999	Wagga Tigers	11.14.80 – 9.8.62 (18 points)	Coolamon	Wagga Tigers
2000	Coolamon	20.12.132 – 15.9.99 (33 points)	Ganmain-Grong Grong-Matong	Wagga Tigers
2001	Wagga Tigers	25.18.168 – 10.8.68 (100 points)	East Wagga-Kooringal	Wagga Tigers
2002	Turvey Park	23.6.144 – 20.11.131 (13 points)	Griffith	Griffith
2003	Griffith	20.20.140 – 9.13.67 (73 points)	Turvey Park	Turvey Park
2004	Ganmain-Grong Grong-Matong	18.12.120 – 10.12.72 (48 points)	Griffith	Ganmain-Grong Grong-Matong
2005	Ganmain-Grong Grong-Matong	14.21.105 – 8.7.55 (50 points)	Narrandera	Ganmain-Grong Grong-Matong
2006	Ganmain-Grong Grong-Matong	13.23.101 – 9.8.62 (39 points)	Leeton-Whitton	Ganmain-Grong Grong-Matong
2007	Wagga Tigers	16.17.113 – 6.13.49 (64 points)	Narrandera	Narrandera
2008	Ganmain-Grong Grong-Matong	15.12.102 – 11.13.79 (23 points)	Leeton-Whitton	Ganmain-Grong Grong-Matong
2009	Ganmain-Grong Grong-Matong	16.13.109 – 8.11.59 (50 points)	Coolamon	Coolamon
2010	Ganmain-Grong Grong-Matong	14.8.92 – 7.8.50 (42 points)	Turvey Park	Ganmain-Grong Grong-Matong
2011	Ganmain-Grong Grong-Matong	14.13.97 – 6.7.43 (54 points)	Coolamon	Ganmain-Grong Grong-Matong
2012	Narrandera	12.11.83 – 6.8.44 (39 points)	Collingullie-Ashmont-Kapooka	Collingullie-Ashmont-Kapooka
2013	Coolamon	11.17.83 – 8.12.60 (23 points)	Collingullie-Ashmont-Kapooka	Coolamon
2014	Collingullie-Ashmont-Kapooka	15.10.100 – 14.3.87 (13 points)	Mangoplah-Cookardinia United-Eastlakes	Collingullie-Ashmont-Kapooka
2015	Collingullie-Glenfield Park	18.9.117 – 6.9.45 (72 points)	Mangoplah-Cookardinia United-Eastlakes	Mangoplah-Cookardinia United-Eastlakes
2016	Wagga Tigers	8.8.56 – 7.10.52 (4 points)	Leeton-Whitton	Wagga Tigers
2017	Leeton-Whitton	10.15.75 – 10.9.69 (6 points)	Collingullie-Glenfield Park	Collingullie-Glenfield Park
2018	Collingullie-Glenfield Park	12.8.80 – 12.6.78 (2 points)	Griffith	Griffith
2019	Wagga Tigers	11.9.75 – 8.7.55 (20 points)	Griffith	Coolamon
2020	Wagga Tigers	16.8.104 – 12.11.83 (21 points)	Leeton-Whitton	Leeton-Whitton
2021	Finals cancelled due to COVID-19
2022	Ganmain-Grong Grong-Matong	6.12.48 – 4.7.31 (17 points)	Collingulie-Glenfield Park	Collingulie-Glenfield Park
2023	Turvey Park	13.9.87 – 8.8.56 (21 points)	Griffith	Turvey Park
2024	Collingullie-Wagga	7.6.48 – 5.12.42 (6 points)	Ganmain-Grong Grong-Matong	Ganmain-Grong Grong-Matong
2025	Collingullie-Wagga	10.7.67 – 8.14.62 (5 points)	Ganmain-Grong Grong-Matong	Collingullie-Wagga

=== Reserve-Grade ===
Season	Grand Final Information			Minor Premiers
Season	Premiers	Score (Margin)	Runners-Up	Minor Premiers
1982	Turvey Park	16.14.110 – 10.9.69 (41 points)	Ariah Park-Mirrool	Ariah Park-Mirrool
1983	Coolamon	24.10.154 – 14.10.94 (60 points)	Ganmain-Grong Grong-Matong	Coolamon
1984	Ganmain-Grong Grong-Matong	25.14.164 – 9.12.66 (98 points)	Wagga Tigers	Ganmain-Grong Grong-Matong
1985	Wagga Tigers	25.22.172 – 9.14.68 (104 points)	Ganmain-Grong Grong-Matong	Wagga Tigers
1986	Wagga Tigers	25.14.164 – 11.3.69 (95 points)	Turvey Park	Wagga Tigers
1987	Turvey Park	13.9.87 – 12.7.79 (8 points)	Wagga Tigers	Turvey Park
1988	Turvey Park	26.28.184 – 7.5.47 (137 points)	Wagga Tigers	Turvey Park
1989	Wagga Tigers	16.5.101 – 10.10.70 (31 points)	Turvey Park	Turvey Park
1990	Wagga Tigers	19.6.120 – 14.21.105 (15 points)	Turvey Park	Turvey Park
1991	Turvey Park	18.10.118 – 12.8.80 (38 points)	Wagga Tigers	Turvey Park
1992	Turvey Park	23.9.147 – 10.6.66 (81 points)	Wagga Tigers	Turvey Park
1993	Turvey Park	14.9.93 – 11.7.73 (20 points)	Wagga Tigers	Wagga Tigers
1994	Turvey Park	15.10.100 – 9.14.68 (32 points)	Wagga Tigers	Wagga Tigers
1995	Turvey Park	19.18.132 – 9.8.62 (70 points)	Narrandera	Narrandera
1996	East Wagga-Kooringal	21.12.138 – 9.11.65 (73 points)	Wagga Tigers	Griffith
1997	Griffith	17.18.120 – 9.11.65 (55 points)	Wagga Tigers	Griffith
1998	Turvey Park	17.19.121 – 8.7.55 (66 points)	Wagga Tigers	Wagga Tigers
1999	Turvey Park	16.21.117 – 4.5.29 (88 points)	Temora	Wagga Tigers
2000	Wagga Tigers	17.9.111 – 15.7.97 (14 points)	Griffith	Griffith
2001	Turvey Park	16.5.101 – 12.5.77 (24 points)	Wagga Tigers	Wagga Tigers
2002	Griffith	19.12.126 – 8.9.57 (69 points)	Turvey Park	Griffith
2003	Coolamon	10.10.70 – 6.8.44 (26 points)	Mangoplah-Cookardinia United-Eastlakes	Coolamon
2004	Narrandera	20.13.133 – 5.5.35 (98 points)	Leeton-Whitton	Coolamon
2005	Coolamon	10.12.72 – 9.4.58 (14 points)	Narrandera	Narrandera
2006	Mangoplah-Cookardinia United-Eastlakes	11.13.79 – 9.5.59 (20 points)	East Wagga-Kooringal	Mangoplah-Cookardinia United-Eastlakes
2007	Coolamon	10.12.72 – 9.9.63 (9 points)	Griffith	Griffith
2008	Mangoplah-Cookardinia United-Eastlakes	19.9.123 – 12.6.78 (45 points)	Narrandera	Mangoplah-Cookardinia United-Eastlakes
2009	Mangoplah-Cookardinia United-Eastlakes	12.9.81 – 11.14.80 (1 point)	Coolamon	Ganmain-Grong Grong-Matong
2010	Coolamon	14.11.95 – 6.4.40 (55 points)	Mangoplah-Cookardinia United-Eastlakes	Coolamon
2011	Wagga Tigers	17.13.115 – 7.5.47 (68 points)	Mangoplah-Cookardinia United-Eastlakes	Wagga Tigers
2012	Wagga Tigers	7.10.52 – 5.8.38 (14 points)	Mangoplah-Cookardinia United-Eastlakes	Mangoplah-Cookardinia United-Eastlakes
2013	Collingullie-Ashmont-Kapooka	15.8.98 – 10.10.70 (28 points)	Mangoplah-Cookardinia United-Eastlakes	Collingullie-Ashmont-Kapooka
2014	Wagga Tigers	13.6.84 – 6.17.53 (31 points)	Mangoplah-Cookardinia United-Eastlakes	Wagga Tigers
2015	Collingullie-Glenfield Park	15.16.106 – 13.15.93 (13 points)	Griffith	Collingullie-Glenfield Park
2016	Wagga Tigers	10.3.63 – 4.3.27 (36 points)	Ganmain-Grong Grong-Matong	Wagga Tigers
2017	Collingullie-Glenfield Park	6.6.42 – 5.9.39 (3 points)	Griffith	Griffith
2018	Collingullie-Glenfield Park	10.10.70 – 7.9.51 (19 points)	Griffith	Collingullie-Glenfield Park
2019	Griffith	7.8.50 – 6.9.45 (5 points)	Collingullie-Glenfield Park	Griffith
2020	Mangoplah Cookardinia United Eastlakes	8.6.54 – 4.4.28 (26 points)	Wagga Tigers	Wagga Tigers
2021	Finals cancelled due to COVID-19
2022	Turvey Park	10.11.71 – 7.13.55 (16 points)	Collingullie-Glenfield Park	Collingullie-Glenfield Park
2023	Coolamon Rovers	17.18.120 – 8.6.54 (66 points)	Turvey Park	Coolamon Rovers
2024	Collingullie-Wagga	9.8.62 – 4.12.36 (26 points)	Ganmain-Grong Grong-Matong	Collingullie-Wagga
2025	Turvey Park	6.13.49 – 6.9.45 (4 points)	Collingullie-Wagga	Turvey Park

=== Under 17s/18s ===
==== Under 18s ====
- 1982: Ganmain-Grong Grong-Matong
- 1983: Ganmain-Grong Grong-Matong
- 1984: Leeton
- 1985: Ganmain-Grong Grong-Matong
- 1986: Turvey Park
- 1987: Turvey Park
- 1988: Wagga Tigers
- 1989: Griffith
- 1990: Turvey Park
- 1991: Griffith
- 1992: Wagga Tigers
- 1993: Wagga Tigers
- 1994: Coolamon
- 1995: Wagga Tigers
- 1996: Collingullie-Ashmont
- 1997: Wagga Tigers
- 1998: Wagga Tigers
- 1999: Griffith
- 2000: Turvey Park
- 2001: Wagga Tigers
- 2002: Narrandera
- 2003: Leeton-Whitton
- 2004: Mangoplah-Cookardinia United-Eastlakes
- 2005: Turvey Park
- 2006: Leeton-Whitton
- 2007: Leeton-Whitton
- 2008: Wagga Tigers

==== Under 17s ====
- 2009: Wagga Tigers
- 2010: Leeton-Whitton
- 2011: Turvey Park
- 2012: Wagga Tigers
- 2013: Wagga Tigers
- 2014: Wagga Tigers
- 2015: Mangoplah-Cookardinia United-Eastlakes
- 2016: Griffith Swans
- 2017: Turvey Park

==== Under 17.5s ====
- 2018: Turvey Park
- 2019: Turvey Park
- 2020: Osborne
- 2021: Finals cancelled due to COVID-19 pandemic
- 2022: Griffith Swans
- 2023: Mangoplah Cookardinia United Eastlakes
- 2024: Mangoplah Cookardinia United Eastlakes
- 2025: Narrandera Imperial

== Final standings ==
=== 2008 Ladder ===
Riverina AFL	Wins	Byes	Losses	Draws	For	Against	%	Pts	Final	Team	G	B	Pts	Team	G	B	Pts
Ganmain GGM	14	0	4	0	1803	1115	161.70%	56	Elimination	Leeton-Whitton	11	6	72	Turvey Park	7	12	54
Wagga Tigers	13	0	5	0	1551	1069	145.09%	52	Qualifying	Wagga Tigers	10	9	69	Coolamon	7	11	53
Coolamon	12	0	5	1	1736	1332	130.33%	50	1st semi	Leeton-Whitton	28	11	179	Coolamon	11	14	80
Turvey Park	11	0	7	0	1789	1252	142.89%	44	2nd semi	Ganmain GGM	17	10	112	Wagga Tigers	11	15	81
Leeton-Whitton	11	0	7	0	1598	1268	126.03%	44	Preliminary	Leeton-Whitton	14	12	96	Wagga Tigers	4	13	37
Narrandera	10	0	7	1	1691	1387	121.92%	42	Grand	Ganmain GGM	15	12	102	Leeton-Whitton	11	13	79
Mangoplah CUE	10	0	8	0	1692	1262	134.07%	40									
Griffith	6	0	12	0	1454	1553	93.63%	24									
Eastern Hawks	2	0	16	0	1189	2009	59.18%	8									
North Wagga	0	0	18	0	685	2941	23.29%	0									

=== 2009 Ladder ===
Riverina AFL	Wins	Byes	Losses	Draws	For	Against	%	Pts	Final	Team	G	B	Pts	Team	G	B	Pts
Coolamon	14	0	3	1	1806	1002	180.24%	58	Elimination	Turvey Park	13	7	85	Leeton-Whitton	9	7	61
Ganmain GGM	14	0	4	0	1723	1092	157.78%	56	Qualifying	Ganmain GGM	13	10	88	Wagga Tigers	5	9	39
Wagga Tigers	14	0	4	0	1582	1035	152.85%	56	1st semi	Wagga Tigers	15	14	104	Turvey Park	11	7	73
Turvey Park	13	0	5	0	1708	1070	159.63%	52	2nd semi	Ganmain GGM	11	8	74	Coolamon	7	21	63
Leeton-Whitton	12	0	6	0	1584	1125	140.80%	48	Preliminary	Coolamon	11	11	77	Wagga Tigers	10	7	67
Mangoplah CUE	10	0	7	1	1496	1211	123.53%	42	Grand	Ganmain GGM	16	13	109	Coolamon	8	11	59
Griffith	5	0	13	0	1216	1740	69.89%	20									
Narrandera	4	0	14	0	1164	1941	59.97%	16									
Eastern Hawks	3	0	15	0	1152	1882	61.21%	12									

=== 2010 Ladder ===
Riverina AFL	Wins	Byes	Losses	Draws	For	Against	%	Pts	Final	Team	G	B	Pts	Team	G	B	Pts
Ganmain GGM	18	0	0	0	2141	912	234.76%	72	Elimination	Turvey Park	11	10	76	Wagga Tigers	5	10	40
Coolamon	12	0	6	0	1598	1111	143.83%	48	Qualifying	Mangoplah CUE	8	6	54	Coolamon	7	9	51
Mangoplah CUE	11	0	6	0	1433	1238	115.75%	44	1st semi	Turvey Park	8	10	58	Coolamon	3	5	23
Turvey Park	10	0	7	0	1399	1122	124.69%	40	2nd semi	Ganmain GGM	12	9	81	Mangoplah CUE	7	7	49
Wagga Tigers	7	0	11	0	1284	1492	86.06%	28	Preliminary	Turvey Park	17	7	109	Mangoplah CUE	10	6	66
Leeton-Whitton	5	0	12	1	1110	1636	67.85%	22	Grand	Ganmain GGM	14	8	92	Turvey Park	7	8	50
Narrandera	5	0	13	0	1172	1759	66.63%	20									
Griffith	2	0	15	1	1086	1953	55.61%	10									

=== 2011 Ladder ===
Riverina AFL	Wins	Byes	Losses	Draws	For	Against	%	Pts	Final	Team	G	B	Pts	Team	G	B	Pts
Ganmain GGM	16	2	0	0	2009	796	252.39%	72	Elimination	Wagga Tigers	10	11	71	Narrandera	8	9	57
Coolamon	11	2	5	0	1513	967	156.46%	52	Qualifying	Coolamon	15	9	99	Collingullie AK	12	14	86
Collingullie AK	11	2	5	0	1674	1312	127.59%	52	1st semi	Collingullie AK	17	8	110	Wagga Tigers	10	15	75
Narrandera	11	2	5	0	1640	1293	126.84%	52	2nd semi	Ganmain GGM	16	8	104	Coolamon	5	6	36
Wagga Tigers	7	2	8	1	1326	1277	103.84%	38	Preliminary	Coolamon	13	9	87	Collingullie AK	12	10	82
Griffith	7	2	8	1	1359	1356	100.22%	38	Grand	Ganmain GGM	14	13	97	Collingullie AK	6	7	43
Leeton-Whitton	3	2	13	0	1074	1736	61.87%	20									
Mangoplah CUE	3	2	13	0	951	1750	54.34%	20									
Turvey Park	2	2	14	0	739	1897	38.96%	16									

=== 2012 Ladder ===
Riverina AFL	Wins	Byes	Losses	Draws	For	Against	%	Pts	Final	Team	G	B	Pts	Team	G	B	Pts
Collingullie AK	12	2	4	0	1769	1129	156.69%	56	Elimination	Narrandera	11	16	82	Wagga Tigers	7	12	54
Leeton-Whitton	11	2	5	0	1490	1131	131.74%	52	Qualifying	Coolamon	15	15	105	Leeton Whitton	15	13	103
Coolamon	10	2	6	0	1538	1243	123.73%	48	1st semi	Narrandera	19	21	135	Leeton Whitton	5	8	38
Wagga Tigers	10	2	6	0	1421	1158	122.71%	48	2nd semi	Collingullie AK	13	7	85	Coolamon	8	16	64
Narrandera	9	2	7	0	1663	1275	130.43%	44	Preliminary	Narrandera	16	10	106	Coolamon	14	8	92
Ganmain GGM	7	2	8	1	1560	1448	107.73%	38	Grand	Narrandera	12	11	83	Collingullie AK	6	8	44
Griffith	7	2	9	0	1362	1489	91.47%	36									
Mangoplah CUE	5	2	10	1	1203	1424	84.48%	30									
Turvey Park	0	2	16	0	702	2411	29.12%	8									

=== 2013 Ladder ===
Riverina AFL	Wins	Byes	Losses	Draws	For	Against	%	Pts	Final	Team	G	B	Pts	Team	G	B	Pts
Coolamon	15	2	1	0	1515	861	175.96%	68	Elimination	Wagga Tigers	13	15	93	Mangoplah CUE	12	4	76
Ganmain GGM	13	2	3	0	1661	1096	151.55%	60	Qualifying	Collingullie AK	16	11	107	Ganmain GGM	4	11	35
Collingullie AK	11	2	5	0	1811	1091	165.99%	52	1st semi	Ganmain GGM	15	9	99	Wagga Tigers	8	14	62
Wagga Tigers	10	2	6	0	1345	1093	123.06%	48	2nd semi	Coolamon	9	7	61	Collingullie AK	6	16	52
Mangoplah CUE	9	2	7	0	1341	1282	104.60%	44	Preliminary	Collingullie AK	15	12	102	Ganmain GGM	9	8	62
Leeton-Whitton	5	2	11	0	1243	1262	98.49%	28	Grand	Coolamon	11	17	83	Collingullie AK	8	12	60
Griffith	4	2	12	0	1082	1693	63.91%	24									
Narrandera	3	2	13	0	1007	1694	59.45%	20									
Turvey Park	2	2	14	0	844	1777	47.50%	16									

=== 2014 Ladder ===
Riverina AFL	Wins	Byes	Losses	Draws	For	Against	%	Pts	Final	Team	G	B	Pts	Team	G	B	Pts
Collingullie AK	15	2	1	0	1692	859	196.97%	68	Elimination	Mangoplah CUE	15	11	101	Coolamon	15	3	93
Mangoplah CUE	13	2	3	0	1537	835	184.07%	60	Qualifying	Wagga Tigers	18	9	117	Ganmain GGM	11	8	74
Coolamon	13	2	3	0	1380	995	138.69%	60	1st semi	Coolamon	13	9	87	Wagga Tigers	12	8	80
Wagga Tigers	10	2	6	0	1251	933	134.08%	48	2nd semi	Mangoplah CUE	12	8	80	Collingullie AK	7	11	53
Ganmain GGM	7	2	9	0	1309	1344	97.40%	36	Preliminary	Collingullie AK	7	8	50	Coolamon	4	7	31
Griffith	5	2	11	0	931	1271	73.25%	28	Grand	Collingullie AK	15	10	100	Mangoplah CUE	14	3	87
Turvey Park	4	2	12	0	900	1416	63.56%	24									
Leeton-Whitton	3	2	13	0	935	1509	61.96%	20									
Narrandera	2	2	14	0	948	1727	54.89%	16									

=== 2015 Ladder ===
Riverina AFL	Wins	Byes	Losses	Draws	For	Against	%	Pts	Final	Team	G	B	Pts	Team	G	B	Pts
Mangoplah CUE	12	2	4	0	1524	811	187.92%	56	Elimination	Collingullie GP	10	8	68	Coolamon	6	3	39
Wagga Tigers	12	2	4	0	1345	975	137.95%	56	Qualifying	Wagga Tigers	9	14	68	Leeton Whitton	7	3	45
Leeton-Whitton	11	2	5	0	1405	1089	129.02%	52	1st semi	Collingullie GP	14	10	94	Leeton Whitton	9	13	67
Coolamon	10	2	6	0	1249	1086	115.01%	48	2nd semi	Mangoplah CUE	11	5	71	Wagga Tigers	7	6	48
Collingullie GP	9	2	7	0	1512	1160	130.34%	44	Preliminary	Collingullie GP	11	12	78	Wagga Tigers	11	8	74
Ganmain GGM	8	2	7	1	1348	1253	107.58%	42	Grand	Collingullie GP	18	9	117	Mangoplah CUE	6	9	45
Griffith	6	2	9	1	1254	1368	91.67%	34									
Narrandera	3	2	13	0	868	1453	59.74%	20									
Turvey Park	0	2	16	0	625	1935	32.30%	8									

=== 2016 Ladder ===
Riverina AFL	Wins	Byes	Losses	Draws	For	Against	%	Pts	Final	Team	G	B	Pts	Team	G	B	Pts
Wagga Tigers	15	2	1	0	1833	587	312.27%	68	Elimination	Collingullie GP	21	12	138	Griffith	10	9	69
Mangoplah CUE	12	2	3	1	1384	856	161.68%	58	Qualifying	Leeton Whitton	10	16	76	Mangoplah CUE	7	9	51
Leeton-Whitton	10	2	6	0	1445	963	150.05%	48	1st semi	Mangoplah CUE	17	11	113	Collingullie GP	13	12	90
Griffith	10	2	6	0	1170	1069	109.45%	48	2nd semi	Wagga Tigers	12	9	81	Leeton Whitton	4	14	38
Collingullie GP	9	2	7	0	1381	1011	136.60%	44	Preliminary	Leeton Whitton	13	15	93	Mangoplah CUE	7	10	52
Ganmain GGM	8	2	8	0	1429	1226	116.56%	40	Grand	Wagga Tigers	8	8	56	Leeton Whitton	7	10	52
Coolamon	5	2	10	1	1140	1362	83.70%	30									
Narrandera	2	2	14	0	697	1909	36.51%	16									
Turvey Park	0	2	16	0	610	2106	28.96%	8									

=== 2017 Ladder ===
Riverina AFL	Wins	Byes	Losses	Draws	For	Against	%	Pts	Final	Team	G	B	Pts	Team	G	B	Pts
Collingullie GP	14	2	2	0	1602	831	192.78%	64	Elimination	Griffith	10	16	76	Coolamon	10	5	65
Mangoplah CUE	14	2	2	0	1405	934	150.43%	64	Qualifying	Leeton Whitton	16	14	110	Mangoplah CUE	10	3	63
Leeton-Whitton	12	2	4	0	1444	941	153.45%	56	1st semi	Griffith	11	13	79	Mangoplah CUE	11	5	71
Griffith	10	2	6	0	1265	955	132.46%	48	2nd semi	Leeton Whitton	12	16	88	Collingullie GP	9	7	61
Coolamon	8	2	8	0	1310	1250	104.80%	40	Preliminary	Collingullie GP	17	12	114	Griffith	7	12	54
Wagga Tigers	7	2	8	1	1246	926	134.56%	38	Grand	Leeton Whitton	10	15	75	Collingullie GP	10	9	69
Turvey Park	4	2	11	1	1008	1305	77.24%	26									
Ganmain GGM	2	2	14	0	931	1559	59.72%	16									
Narrandera	0	2	16	0	658	2168	30.35%	8									

=== 2018 Ladder ===
Riverina AFL	Wins	Byes	Losses	Draws	For	Against	%	Pts	Final	Team	G	B	Pts	Team	G	B	Pts
Griffith	16	2	0	0	1526	727	209.90%	72	Elimination	Leeton/Whitton	13	11	89	Mangoplah CUE	10	10	70
Collingullie GP	13	2	3	0	1506	922	163.34%	60	Qualifying	Collingullie GP	10	6	66	Ganmain GGM	8	13	61
Ganmain GGM	11	2	5	0	1370	1125	121.78%	52	1st semi	Ganmain GGM	8	11	59	Leeton/Whitton	8	8	56
Mangoplah CUE	9	2	6	1	1134	976	116.19%	46	2nd semi	Collingullie GP	10	13	73	Griffith	8	12	60
Leeton-Whitton	7	2	8	1	1076	1110	96.94%	38	Preliminary	Griffith	15	7	97	Ganmain GGM	12	8	80
Coolamon	7	2	9	0	1157	1463	79.08%	36	Grand	Collingullie GP	12	8	80	Griffith	12	6	78
Turvey Park	5	2	10	1	937	1196	78.34%	30									
Wagga Tigers	2	2	13	1	940	1402	67.05%	18									
Narrandera	0	2	16	0	1027	1752	58.62%	8									

=== 2019 Ladder ===
Riverina AFL	Wins	Byes	Losses	Draws	For	Against	%	Pts	Final	Team	G	B	Pts	Team	G	B	Pts
Coolamon	13	0	3	0	1506	1121	134.34%	52	Elimination	Mangoplah CUE	18	6	114	Ganmain GGM	10	8	68
Wagga Tigers	12	0	4	0	1431	849	168.55%	48	Qualifying	Griffith	12	4	76	Wagga Tigers	7	9	51
Griffith	12	0	4	0	1330	1034	128.63%	48	1st semi	Wagga Tigers	13	14	92	Mangoplah CUE	6	9	45
Ganmain GGM	10	0	6	0	1455	1193	121.96%	40	2nd semi	Griffith	10	11	71	Coolamon	7	7	49
Mangoplah CUE	9	0	7	0	1172	1021	114.79%	36	Preliminary	Wagga Tigers	15	8	98	Coolamon	7	8	50
Turvey Park	7	0	9	0	1168	1262	92.55%	28	Grand	Wagga Tigers	11	9	75	Griffith	8	7	55
Collingullie GP	4	0	12	0	1157	1367	84.64%	16									
Narrandera	3	0	13	0	984	1618	60.82%	12									
Leeton-Whitton	2	0	14	0	804	1542	52.14%	8									

== 2020 Ladder ==
	Wins	Byes	Losses	Draws	For	Against	%	Pts	Final	Team	G	B	Pts	Team	G	B	Pts
Leeton-Whitton	5	0	1	0	449	334	134.43%	20	Elimination								
Wagga Tigers	5	0	1	0	407	316	128.80%	20	Qualifying								
Ganmain GGM	4	0	2	0	488	294	165.99%	16	1st Semi	Ganmain GGM	11	10	76	Mangoplah CUE	5	16	46
Mangoplah CUE	2	0	4	0	341	382	89.27%	8	2nd Semi	Wagga Tigers	11	13	79	Leeton-Whitton	11	10	76
Osborne	1	0	5	0	266	357	74.51%	4	Preliminary	Leeton-Whitton	12	15	87	Ganmain GGM	5	16	46
Turvey Park	1	0	5	0	254	522	48.66%	4	Grand	Wagga Tigers	16	8	104	Leeton-Whitton	12	11	83

== 2021 Ladder ==
Season abandoned due to the COVID-19 pandemic.

Riverina AFL	Wins	Byes	Losses	Draws	For	Against	%	Pts	Final	Team	G	B	Pts	Team	G	B	Pts
Ganmain GGM	13	0	2	0	1476	645	228.84%	52									
Mangoplah CUE	13	0	2	0	1378	715	192.73%	52									
Wagga Tigers	9	0	6	0	933	832	112.14%	36									
Coolamon	8	0	6	0	1006	889	113.16%	32									
Collingullie GP	8	0	7	0	955	1042	91.65%	32									
Turvey Park	7	0	8	0	1004	1024	98.05%	28									
Leeton-Whitton	5	0	10	0	876	1165	75.19%	20									
Griffith	2	0	13	0	849	1280	66.33%	8									
Narrandera	2	0	13	0	708	1593	44.44%	8									

== 2022 Ladder ==
Riverina AFL	Wins	Byes	Losses	Draws	For	Against	%	Pts	Final	Team	G	B	Pts	Team	G	B	Pts
Collingullie GP	13	0	2	1	1612	825	195.39%	54	Elimination	Turvey Park	14	7	91	Mangoplah CUE	7	7	49
Ganmain GGM	13	0	3	0	1531	747	204.95%	52	Qualifying	Ganmain GGM	11	12	78	Coolamon	10	7	67
Coolamon	12	0	3	1	1384	826	167.55%	50	1st Semi	Coolamon	13	9	87	Turvey Park	9	17	71
Mangoplah CUE	11	0	5	0	1227	959	127.95%	44	2nd Semi	Ganmain GGM	12	14	86	Collingullie GP	6	7	43
Turvey Park	8	0	8	0	1289	1125	114.58%	32	Preliminary	Collingullie GP	10	13	73	Coolamon	8	11	59
Wagga Tigers	5	0	11	0	1099	1075	102.23%	20	Grand	Ganmain GGM	6	12	48	Collingullie GP	4	7	31
Leeton-Whitton	0	0	16	0	654	1707	38.31%	0									
Griffith	5	0	11	0	955	1486	64.27%	20									
Narrandera	4	0	12	0	817	1818	44.94%	16									

== 2023 Ladder ==
Riverina AFL	Wins	Byes	Losses	Draws	For	Against	%	Pts	Final	Team	G	B	Pts	Team	G	B	Pts
Turvey Park	12	0	4	0	1401	845	165.80%	48	Elimination	Collingullie GP	9	14	68	Coolamon	8	16	64
Ganmain GGM	12	0	4	0	1336	955	139.90%	48	Qualifying	Ganmain GGM	9	12	66	Griffith	12	9	81
Griffith	10	0	5	1	1450	939	154.42%	42	1st Semi	Ganmain GGM	11	8	74	Collingullie GP	6	11	47
Collingullie GP	9	0	7	0	1405	1047	134.19%	36	2nd Semi	Griffith	11	8	74	Turvey Park	7	11	53
Coolamon	9	0	7	0	1278	985	129.75%	36	Preliminary	Turvey Park	11	6	72	Ganmain GGM	10	10	70
Wagga Tigers	9	0	7	0	1092	898	121.60%	36	Grand	Turvey Park	13	9	87	Griffith	8	8	56
Mangoplah CUE	8	0	7	1	1130	947	119.32%	34									
Leeton-Whitton	2	0	14	0	580	1876	30.92%	8									
Narrandera	0	0	16	0	781	1961	39.83%	0									

== See also ==
- AFL NSW/ACT
- Australian rules football in New South Wales
- Albury & District Football League
- Central Hume Football Association
- Central Riverina Football League (1949–1981)
- Coreen & District Football League
- Farrer Football League
- Group 9 Rugby League
- Group 20 Rugby League
- Group 17 Rugby League
- Hume Football Netball League
- Riverina Football Association (1924–1929)
- South West Football League (New South Wales) (1910–1981)
