= Colin Hounsell =

Australian rules footballer

Personal information
- Born: 4 September 1955 (age 71); Wagga Wagga, New South Wales
- Original team: Collingullie
- Height: 173 cm (5 ft 8 in)
- Weight: 71 kg (157 lb)
- Position: Centre

Playing career^{1}
Years	Club	Games (Goals)
1975–1979 & 1981–1985	South Melbourne/Sydney	122 (98)
- ^{1} Playing statistics correct to the end of 1985.

Colin Hounsell (born 4 September 1955) is a former Australian rules footballer who played with the South Melbourne/Sydney Football Club in the Victorian Football League (VFL).

Hounsell came from Collingullie, a small town near Wagga Wagga, New South Wales. Hounsell won the 1974 Farrer Football League best and fairest award, the Baz Medal.

He played mostly as a rover or centre. In 1976, his second season, he was involved in a clearance dispute with the Collingwood Football Club, who had been offered his services in the trade which saw Robert Dean join South Melbourne. Hounsell however refused to sign with Collingwood and remained at South Melbourne, until 1979.

After the 1979 season, Hounsell made his way to the Northern Territory and played with NTFL side Nightcliff. The competition came to an end early 1980 and he then signed a two-year contract Woodville in the South Australian National Football League. He made 13 appearances for them before deciding to return to Melbourne during the 1981 season, on the request of his fiancee, despite the protests of Woodville.

He performed well for South Melbourne in 1981, averaging a career high 17 disposals a game. The following year he was on the move again, as South Melbourne relocated to Sydney. He played a further four seasons with the club.

Hounsell won the 1987 - Riverina Football League / Jim Quinn Medal for East Wagga / Kooringal Football Club.
