= Harry Frei =

Australian rules footballer and cricketer

- Born: Harald Frei; 1 March 1951 (age 75); Nuremberg, West Germany
Australian rules football career
Playing career^{1}
Years	Club	Games (Goals)
1973	Footscray	6 (0)
- ^{1} Playing statistics correct to the end of 1973.
- Cricket career

Cricket information
- Batting: Right-handed
- Bowling: Left-arm fast-medium
- Role: Bowler

Domestic team information
- Years: Team
- 1982–1986: Queensland

Career statistics
Competition	First-class	List A
Matches	37	13
Runs scored	489	10
Batting average	13.21	3.33
100s/50s	0/1	0/0
Top score	57	5
Balls bowled	7,330	696
Wickets	91	13
Bowling average	38.00	33.38
5 wickets in innings	2	0
10 wickets in match	0	0
Best bowling	6/52	2/17
Catches/stumpings	19/–	4/–
- Source: CricketArchive, 15 August 2022

Harald Frei (born 1 March 1951) is an Australian former first-class cricketer who represented Queensland.

Frei appeared six times for Australian rules football club Footscray during the 1973 VFL season.

In 1978, Frei played for Lockhart Football Club in the Farrer Football League and played in the NSW Football Championships.

He later played football in the La Trobe Valley Football League and with the North Launceston Football Club, before moving to Brisbane where he played cricket for Toombul District Cricket Club.

It was not until the age of 31 that he made his first-class cricket debut, picked to play against a Bob Willis led England XI. In a match that Queensland won, he dismissed the Test player Graeme Fowler for single figures in both innings as well as David Gower twice. Even though he was picked primarily as a fast-medium bowler, he managed to top score for Queensland in their first innings. His 57 runs, which came off just 36 deliveries and included five sixes, ended when he was bowled by Norman Cowans.

As a result of his strong showing against England, Frei made his Sheffield Shield debut the following week and went on to take 20 wickets at 38.75 for the 1982/83 season. He performed better in Queensland's 1983/84 Shield campaign with 23 wickets at 24.08, helping them to their first final, which they lost to Western Australia. Frei took 30 wickets and played in another final in 1985/86 before his form began deteriorating. He managed just eight wickets at 67.37 the following season and never represented Queensland again.
