= William Box =

William Box may refer to:

- Bill Box (1938–2006), Australian rules footballer for Essendon
- William Draper Box (1841–1904), Australian politician, member of the Queensland Legislative Council
- William Box (American politician), member of the South Dakota House of Representatives
