= Jason Wild =

Australian rules footballer

Jason Wild (footballer)

Personal information
- Born: 10 February 1976 (age 50); Wagga Wagga, New South Wales
- Original team: Collingullie-Ashmont (Farrer Football League)

Playing career^{1}
Years	Club	Games (Goals)
1995–1999	Collingwood	70 (22)
- ^{1} Playing statistics correct to the end of 1999.

Career highlights
- Joseph Wren Memorial Trophy 1999

Jason Wild (born 10 February 1976) is a former Australian rules footballer who played with the Collingwood Football Club in the Australian Football League (AFL).

Selected by the Collingwood Magpies at number 39 in the 1993 National Draft from New South Wales country club Collingullie-Ashmont, Wild made his AFL debut in 1995 on ANZAC Day and would play 12 games in his debut season.

Wild was often praised for his work ethic and determination was at a high level and was a go-to man for Tony Shaw as a run-with type player. Wild played 70 games for the club between 1995 and 1999 before being delisted.

Wild played for Yarrawonga in the Ovens & Murray Football League between 2000 and 2007 and kicked 96 goals during that time and was best on ground in Yarrawonga's 2006 premiership.

Wild won the 2009 Picola & District Football League best and fairest award, the Pearce Medal, when playing for Katamatite and played in their 2012 premiership side.
