= Doug Priest =

Australian rules footballer (born 1947)

Personal information
- Full name: Doug Priest
- Born: 17 November 1947 (age 78)
- Original team: Holbrook
- Height: 188 cm (6 ft 2 in)
- Weight: 89 kg (196 lb)

Playing career^{1}
Years	Club	Games (Goals)
1966–69	South Melbourne	26 (0)
- ^{1} Playing statistics correct to the end of 1969.

Doug Priest (born 17 November 1947) is a former Australian rules footballer who played with South Melbourne in the Victorian Football League (VFL).

Priest began playing for Holbrook in the Farrer Football League in 1962 and was a member of their 1964 premiership team, under Brian Prior.

After his four years with South Melbourne, he returned to coach Ariah Park - Mirrool in the South West Football League (1970 & 1971), then went to Wagga Tigers Football Club as captain coach in 1972 till 1976, leading them to the 1975 premiership over Henty.

He stayed on at Wagga Tigers and played in their 1977 premiership and also won the Farrer Football League best and fairest award, the Baz Medal.
