= Paul Hawke =

Australian rules footballer

Personal information
- Born: 4 July 1964 (age 62); Wagga Wagga, New South Wales
- Original team: Wagga Tigers (RFL)
- Height: 182 cm (6 ft 0 in)
- Weight: 81 kg (179 lb)
- Position: Ruck-rover

Playing career^{1}
Years	Club	Games (Goals)
1984–1987 & 1991	Sydney	73 (72)
1988–1989	Collingwood	41 (30)
Total		114 (102)
- ^{1} Playing statistics correct to the end of 1991.

Paul Hawke (born 4 July 1964) is a former Australian rules football player who played with the Sydney and Collingwood Football Clubs in the Australian Football League (AFL).

A versatile ruck-rover from Riverina Football League (RFL) club Wagga Tigers, Hawke kicked 23 goals in his debut season at Sydney. He represented New South Wales at the 1988 Adelaide Bicentennial Carnival. Hawke played his best football after he crossed to Collingwood and in 1989 averaged 25.89 disposals a game, 41 of them in a win over Richmond. He finished equal seventh in the Brownlow Medal, the best placed Collingwood player, but was runner-up in Collingwood's Best and Fairest Award, the Copeland Trophy. Collingwood broke through for a drought breaking premiership in 1990 but Hawke spent the entire season in the reserves. He returned to Sydney in 1991 but could only manage one appearance with the seniors.
