= Matthew Kennedy (footballer, born 1997) =

Australian rules footballer

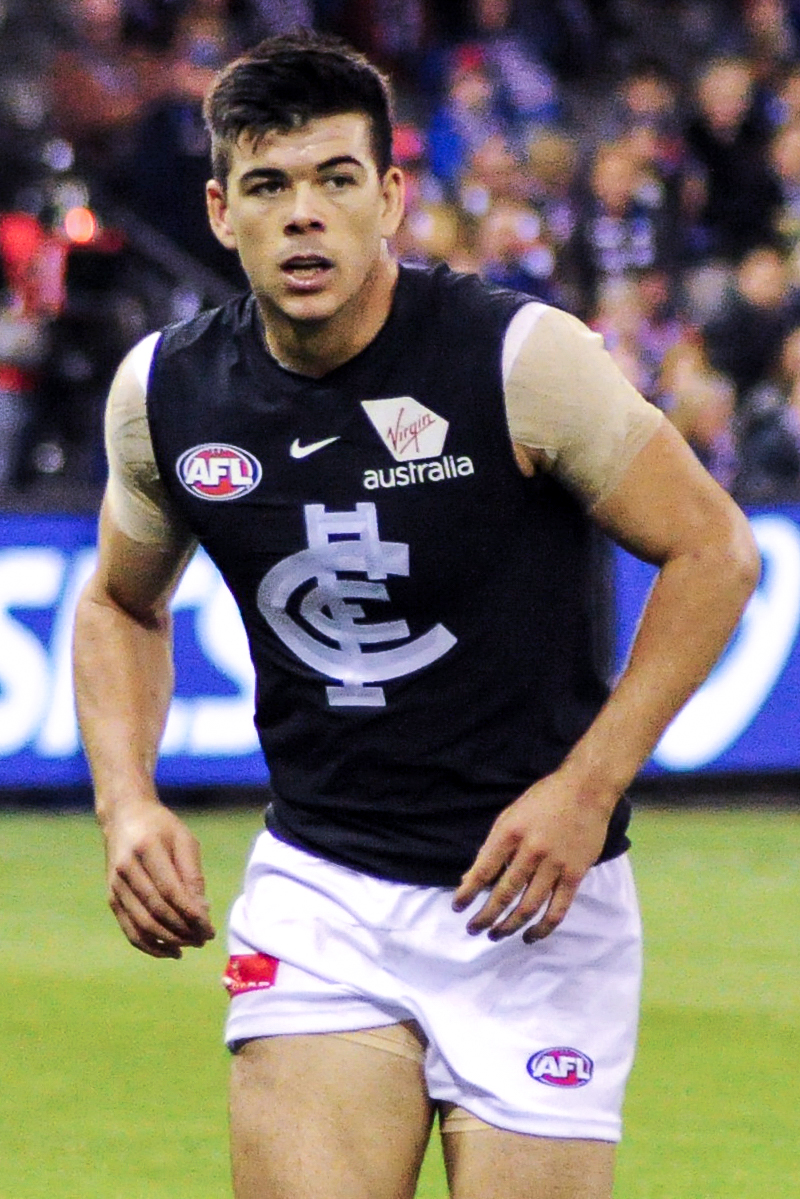

Personal information
- Full name: Matthew Thomas Kennedy
- Born: 6 April 1997 (age 29); San Isidore, New South Wales
- Original teams: Collingullie-Glenfield Park (Riverina FNL), GWS Giants Academy
- Draft: No. 13, 2015 AFL draft
- Height: 190 cm (6 ft 3 in)
- Weight: 90 kg (198 lb)
- Position: Midfielder

Club information
- Current club: Western Bulldogs
- Number: 8

Playing career^{1}
Years	Club	Games (Goals)
2016–2017	Greater Western Sydney	19 (7)
2018–2024	Carlton	99 (50)
2025–	Western Bulldogs	44 (29)
Total		160 (84)
- ^{1} Playing statistics correct to the end of round 22, 2026.

Matthew Thomas Kennedy (born 6 April 1997) is a professional Australian rules footballer playing for the Western Bulldogs in the Australian Football League (AFL). He previously played for the Greater Western Sydney Giants from 2016 to 2017, and the Carlton Football Club from 2018 to 2024.

== Early life ==
Kennedy is from the small town of Collingullie, New South Wales. He participated in the Auskick program at Collingullie. He and former Giants teammate Harry Perryman played together for most of their junior career. Kennedy was recruited from Collingullie-Glenfield Park Football Club in the Riverina Football Netball League, where he played in consecutive senior premierships in 2014 and 2015. A member of the Giants' academy program, he was drafted by the Giants with the thirteenth selection in the 2015 AFL draft, matching a bid from Richmond.

== AFL career ==
=== Greater Western Sydney career (2016–2017) ===
Kennedy made his debut against the Essendon in round 13 of the 2016 AFL season. In an impressive performance, he kicked three goals as the Giants defeated Essendon by 27 points.

=== Carlton career (2018–2024) ===
In October 2017, Kennedy was traded to Carlton.

Carlton demoted Kennedy to the rookie list at the end of the 2020 season to make salary cap space due to the coronavirus pandemic; but after a successful 2021 season he was re-elevated to the senior list for 2022.

=== Western Bulldogs career (2024–) ===
Kennedy was again traded after the 2024 AFL season, this time to the Western Bulldogs.

== Statistics ==
Updated to the end of round 22, 2026.

Legend
G	Goals	K	Kicks	D	Disposals	T	Tackles
B	Behinds	H	Handballs	M	Marks

Season	Team	No.	Games	Totals							Averages (per game)							Votes
Season	Team	No.	Games	G	B	K	H	D	M	T	G	B	K	H	D	M	T	Votes
2016	Greater Western Sydney	15	3	3	1	12	17	29	6	5	1.0	0.3	4.0	5.7	9.7	2.0	1.7	0
2017	Greater Western Sydney	15	16	4	4	119	156	275	52	73	0.3	0.3	7.4	9.8	17.2	3.3	4.6	0
2018	Carlton	7	12	3	3	83	123	206	40	40	0.3	0.3	6.9	10.3	17.2	3.3	3.3	0
2019	Carlton	7	10	11	5	62	45	107	27	16	1.1	0.5	6.2	4.5	10.7	2.7	1.6	1
2020 (Note: The 2020 season was played with 17 home-and-away matches per team (down from 22) and 16-minute quarters with time on (down from 20-minute quarters with time on) due to the impact of the COVID-19 pandemic.)	Carlton	7	7	2	1	63	50	113	26	20	0.3	0.1	9.0	7.1	16.1	3.7	2.9	0
2021	Carlton	7	13	6	2	138	101	239	60	54	0.5	0.2	10.6	7.8	18.4	4.6	4.2	0
2022	Carlton	7	17	7	7	210	206	416	78	69	0.4	0.4	12.4	12.1	24.5	4.6	4.1	4
2023	Carlton	7	16	5	6	157	134	291	58	48	0.3	0.4	9.8	8.4	18.2	3.6	3.0	0
2024	Carlton	7	24	16	10	245	179	424	105	81	0.7	0.4	10.2	7.5	17.7	4.4	3.4	2
2025	Western Bulldogs	8	23	21	8	289	244	533	103	117	0.9	0.3	12.6	10.6	23.2	4.5	5.1	5
2026	Western Bulldogs	8	21	8	10	249	225	474	85	92	0.4	0.5	11.9	10.7	22.6	4.0	4.4	0
Career			162	86	57	1627	1480	3107	640	615	0.5	0.4	10.0	9.1	19.2	4.0	3.8	12
