= Lockhart Football Club =

Lockhart FNC

Names
- Full name: Lockhart Football & Netball Club
- Nickname: Demons

Club details
- Founded: 1898; 128 years ago
- Colours
- Competition: Hume Football League
- Premierships: The Rock & District FA (2): 1934, 1935. Milbrulong & District Football League (1): 1948. Central Riverina Football League (2): 1949, 1956. Farrer Football League (1): 1960. Hume Football League (2): 1982, 2003.
- Ground: Lockhart Recreation Ground

Uniforms
Home

Other information
- Official website: Lockhart Football / Netball Club

The Lockhart Football and Netball Club is situated in the Riverina, New South Wales area and currently plays in the Hume Football League and fields four football and five netball teams in this competition.

== History ==
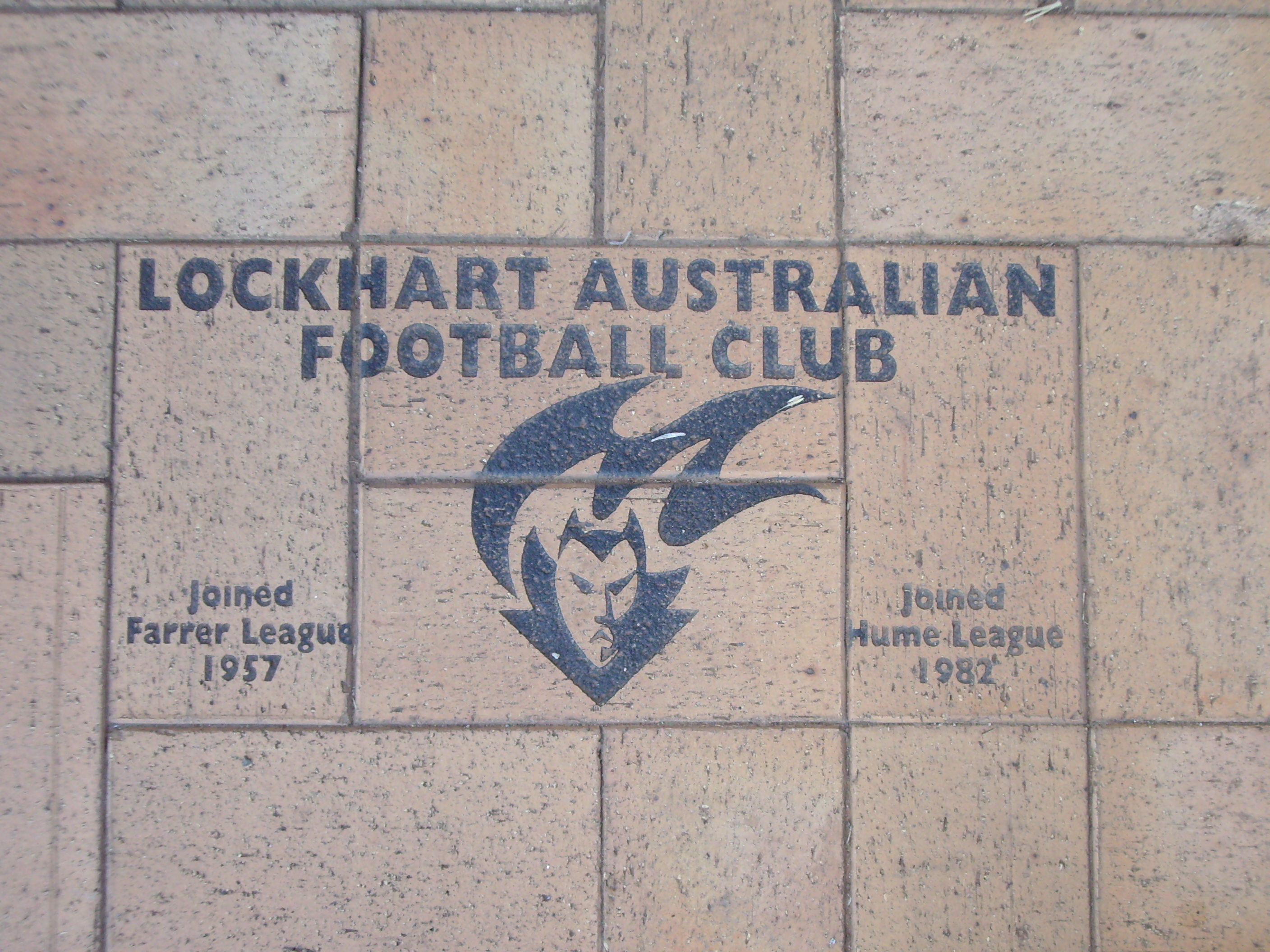
Lockhart Paving Mural

The Lockhart Football Club (Australian rules football) was formed in April 1898, after a meeting at the Lockhart Hotel. and they defeated Urana in their first official game in August 1898.

In 1925, The Urangeline & DFA, had six teams in the competition and both Lockhart FC and Milbrulong FC were expelled from the competition on the eve of the finals series, for refusing to play their final at Urangeline. Urangeline FC were defeated by Osborne FC in the grand final played at Pleasant Hills and won Mrs Maloney's Cup.

In 1931, Lockhart was refused entry into The Rock & DFA

Lockhart played in four consecutive grand finals in The Rock & District Cricket Association between 1933 and 1936, winning two premierships.

== Football Competitions ==
Lockhart FC have played in the following competitions –

- 1905: Lockhart & District Football Association. 1905 Premiers, Napier South
- 1906: Greensgunyah Football Association. 1906 Premiers, Boree Creek
- 1907 – 1909: Lockhart & District Football Association. Premiers: 1907: Boree Creek; 1908: Napier South, 1909: Boree Creek,
- 1910 & 1911: The Rock Football Association. Premiers: 1910 – Milbrulong, finished on top of the ladder., 1911: Milbrulong
- 1912 – 1914: Lockhart & District Football Association: Premiers: 1912 – Boree Creek; 1913: Oaklands 1914: Urana
- 1915 – 1917: Club in recess due to World War I
- 1918 – 1924: Lockhart & District Football Association. Premiers – 1918: Brookdale, 1920: Mt. Pleasant, 1921: Tootool, 1922: Lockhart, 1923: Oaklands, 1924: Oaklands
- 1925 – 1926: Urangeline Football Association
- 1927 & 1928: Osborne & District Football Association
- 1929 – Lockhart Lines Football Association. Premiers: Osborne
- 1930 – 1931: Active but did not play in an official competition. In 1931, Lockhart was refused entry into The Rock & DFA
- 1932 – 1939: The Rock And District Football League. Premiers: 1932 – The Rock; 1933 – Mangoplah, 1934 – Lockhart, 1935 – Lockhart, 1936 – The Rock, 1937 – Osborne, 1938 – Drawn grand final, 1938 – Grand final replay, Osborne won, 1939 – Milbrulong
- 1940: Lockhart & District Football Association. 1940 Premiers: Osborne
- 1941 – 1944: Club in recess due to World War II
- 1945 – 1948: Milbrulong & District Football League
- 1949 – 1956: Central Riverina Football League
- 1957: Albury & District Football League. 1957 Premiers: Wagga
- 1958 – 1981: Farrer Football League
- 1982 – 2025: Hume Football League

== Football Premierships ==
Seniors

- Lockhart Oaklands Lines Football Association
  - 1922: Lockhart: 5.15 – 45 d Milbrulong: 3.3 – 21
- The Rock & District Football Association
  - 1934 – Lockhart: 9.13 – 67 d The Rock: 9.12 – 66
  - 1935 – Lockhart d Milbrulong: by 12 points
- Milbrulong & District Football League
  - 1948 – Lockhart: 9.14 – 68 d Yerong Creek: 9.13 – 67
- Central Riverina Football League
  - 1949 – Lockhart: 15.12 – 102 d Yerong Creek: 7.7 – 49
  - 1956 – Lockhart: d Milbrulong:
- Farrer Football League
  - 1960 – Lockhart: 16.14 – 110 d Wagga Tigers: 14.10 – 94
- Hume Football League
  - 1982 – Lockhart: 13.17 – 95 d Henty: 7.6 – 48
  - 2003 – Lockhart: 19.12 – 126 d Holbrook: 13.6 – 84

Reserves

- Hume Football League
  - 2006

== Football Runners Up ==
Seniors

- Lockhart & District Football Association
  - 1911, 1913, 1921
- Urangeline Football Association
  - 1926
- The Rock & District Football Association
  - 1933, 1936
- Farrer Football League
  - 1959, 1968

== Football Best and Fairest Awards ==
- Farrer Football League – Baz Medal
  - Seniors
    - 1959 – R Haberecht
    - 1968 – John Wright
    - 1972, 1973, 1975 – Jeff Nimmo
- Hume Football League – Azzi Medal
  - Seniors
    - 1982 – Graeme Johnstone
    - 1991 – Warren Sykes
    - 1998 – Shane Lennon
    - 1999 – Paul Scoullar
    - 2009 – Nathan McPherson
    - 2023 – Abe Wooden
  - Reserves
    - 1985 – Peter Hyde
    - 1999 – Rhys Kelly
    - 2015 – Josh Firman

== Leading Goalkicker ==
- Seniors
  - Farrer Football League
    - 1974 – Steven Goodwin: 111
- Seniors
  - Hume Football League
    - 1982 – Warren Sykes: 133
    - 1983 – Warren Sykes: 117
    - 1998 – Michael Hewitt: 82
    - 1999 – Anthony Carroll: 121

== VFL / AFL Players ==
- 1973 – Harry Frei – Footscray
- 1981 – Dennis Carroll – Sydney Swans

== Links ==
- Albury & District Football League
- Central Riverina Football League
- Farrer Football League
- Hume Football League
- Australian rules football in New South Wales
- Albury & DFL & Farrer FL Premiership & Best & Fairest Lists. 1930 to 1979 (page 20)
