= Harry Perryman =

Australian rules footballer for the Collingwood Magpies

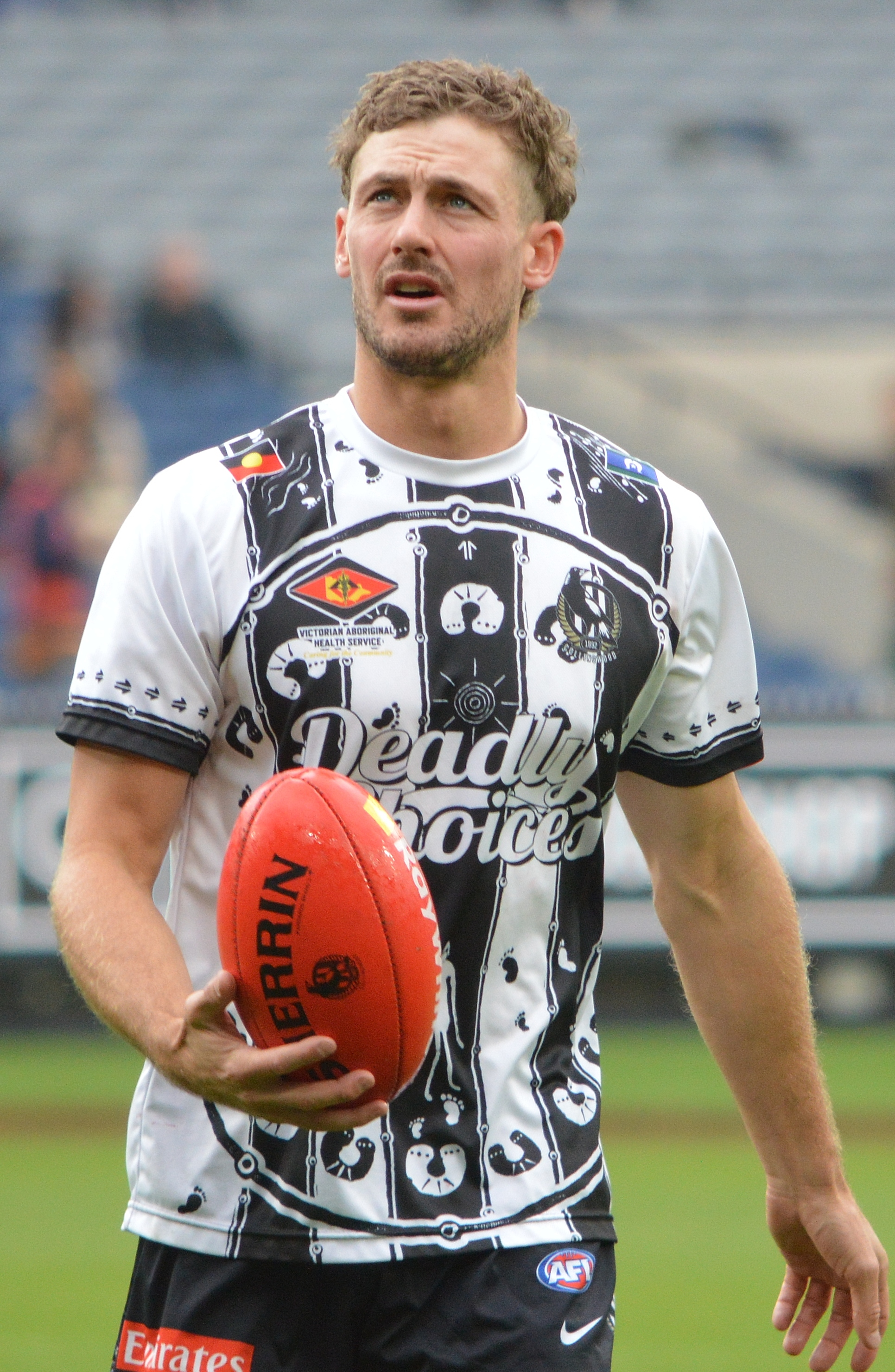
- Perryman playing for Collingwood in May 2025

Personal information
- Full name: Harrison Maxwell Perryman
- Nickname: Pez
- Born: 19 December 1998 (age 27)
- Original team: Collingullie-Glenfield Park (RFNL)/GWS Giants Academy
- Draft: No. 14, 2016 national draft
- Debut: Round 9, 2017, Greater Western Sydney vs. Richmond, at Spotless Stadium
- Height: 186 cm (6 ft 1 in)
- Weight: 84 kg (185 lb)
- Position: Defender

Club information
- Current club: Collingwood
- Number: 12

Playing career^{1}
Years	Club	Games (Goals)
2017–2024	Greater Western Sydney	129 (28)
2025–	Collingwood	41 (4)
Total		170 (32)
- ^{1} Playing statistics correct to the end of the 2026 season.

Harrison Maxwell Perryman (born 19 December 1998) is a professional Australian rules footballer playing for the Collingwood Football Club in the Australian Football League (AFL). Perryman was initially drafted to Greater Western Sydney and played 129 games for the Giants before moving to Collingwood as a free agent during the 2024 AFL Trade Period.

== Early life ==
Perryman was raised in the small Riverina town of Collingullie in country New South Wales and was educated at Riverina Anglican College in Wagga Wagga. He participated in the Auskick program at Collingullie-Glenfield Park Demons and began playing junior football for the club in the Riverina Football Netball League. A standout in his age group, he was placed in Greater Western Sydney's academy program as a teenager and was later drafted by the Giants with their third selection and fourteenth overall in the 2016 national draft.

Perryman is one of two Giants players from the small town of Collingullie, New South Wales, along with Matthew Kennedy, who has also since left the club. The two played together for most of their junior careers.

== AFL career ==
Perryman made his AFL debut during the three point win against Richmond at Spotless Stadium in round nine of the 2017 season. In the match, his outstretched smother proved pivotal as what appeared to be a match-winning goal for Richmond was overturned on review. A minute later, Jeremy Cameron would kick the match-winning goal for the Giants.

After eight seasons with the Giants, Perryman exercised his rights as a free agent and moved to Collingwood at the end of the 2024 AFL season.

== Statistics ==
Updated to the end of round 22, 2026.

Legend
G	Goals	K	Kicks	D	Disposals	T	Tackles
B	Behinds	H	Handballs	M	Marks

Season	Team	No.	Games	Totals							Averages (per game)							Votes
Season	Team	No.	Games	G	B	K	H	D	M	T	G	B	K	H	D	M	T	Votes
2017	Greater Western Sydney	36	8	1	0	56	38	94	34	26	0.1	0.0	7.0	4.8	11.8	4.3	3.3	0
2018	Greater Western Sydney	36	9	1	0	59	76	135	28	24	0.1	0.0	6.6	8.4	15.0	3.1	2.7	0
2019	Greater Western Sydney	36	19	2	7	214	135	349	100	59	0.1	0.4	11.3	7.1	18.4	5.3	3.1	0
2020 (Note: The 2020 season was played with 17 home-and-away matches per team (down from 22) and 16-minute quarters with time on (down from 20-minute quarters with time on) due to the impact of the COVID-19 pandemic.)	Greater Western Sydney	36	16	11	2	170	124	294	61	32	0.7	0.1	10.6	7.8	18.4	3.8	2.0	4
2021	Greater Western Sydney	36	18	4	5	268	132	400	92	39	0.2	0.3	14.9	7.3	22.2	5.1	2.2	0
2022	Greater Western Sydney	36	16	3	0	190	160	350	66	77	0.2	0.0	11.9	10.0	21.9	4.1	4.8	0
2023	Greater Western Sydney	36	22	3	3	224	164	388	66	92	0.1	0.1	10.2	7.5	17.6	3.0	4.2	0
2024	Greater Western Sydney	36	21	3	1	235	143	378	104	59	0.1	0.0	11.2	6.8	18.0	5.0	2.8	0
2025	Collingwood	12	25	4	6	247	136	383	102	65	0.2	0.2	9.9	5.4	15.3	4.1	2.6	0
2026	Collingwood	12	16	0	2	168	93	261	72	44	0.0	0.1	10.5	5.8	16.3	4.5	2.8	0
Career			170	32	26	1831	1201	3032	725	517	0.2	0.2	10.8	7.1	17.8	4.3	3.0	4
