= Farrer Football League =

Australian rules football and netball competition

Farrer Football Netball League
- Sport: Australian rules football Netball
- Founded: 1957; 69 years ago
- First season: 1957
- CEO: Joel Robinson
- COO: Dee Anderson
- President: Greg Fox
- No. of teams: 9
- Country: Australia
- Venues: Maher Oval, Wagga Wagga
- Most recent champion: Temora (2025)
- Most titles: (12) Mangoplah-Cookardinia United
- Website: aflriverina.com.au/farrer

The Farrer Football Netball League (FFNL) is an Australian rules football and netball competition containing nine clubs based in the Riverina region of New South Wales, Australia. The league features three grades in the Australian rules football competition, with these being First-Grade, Reserve-Grade and Under 17s. In the netball competition there are four grades, with these being A-Grade, A-Reserve Grade, B-Grade and C-Grade.

The Farrer FNL is named after William Farrer, a leading English Australian agronomist and plant breeder. Farrer is best remembered as the originator of the "Federation" strain of wheat, distributed in 1903. His work resulted in significant improvements in both the quality and crop yields of Australia's national wheat harvest, a contribution for which he earned the title 'father of the Australian wheat industry'.

Currently a home and away season consisting of eighteen rounds is played. The best five teams then play off according to the McIntyre system, culminating in the FFNL Grand Final, which is traditionally held at Maher Oval in Wagga Wagga.

== History ==
=== Breakaway ===
The Farrer Football League first formed in 1957 as a breakaway from the Albury & District Football League. Culcairn, Henty, Holbrook and Mangoplah-Cookardinia United competed in the first season. In 1958 all remaining clubs from the Albury & District Football League moved across to the new league.

The Farrer FL senior football best and fairest medal was called the Baz Medal, which was first donated in 1952 by Mr. Mick Baz of Culcairn as the award in the Albury & District Football League, which was carried on into the Farrer FL.

In 1976, the Farrer FL won the NSW State Championships series held at Finley in June, defeating the Sydney Football League and the South West District FL.

The name of the best and fairest award from 1982 onwards has been the Gerald Clear Award.

=== Restructure ===
It was in 1982 that the Farrer Football League amalgamated with the South West Football League (New South Wales) and the Central Riverina Football League in order to create the Riverina Football League and the Riverina District Football League, with the latter changing its name to the Farrer Football League in 1985. It was between 1983 and 1994 that the Riverina District/Farrer Football League maintained a two division system, with a promotion / relegation system in force during that time.

=== Timeframe ===
- 1930–1957: Albury & District Football League
- 1957–1981: Farrer Football League
- 1982: Riverina District Football League
- 1983–1984: Riverina District Football League – Division One
- 1983–1984: Riverina District Football League – Division Two
- 1985–1994: Farrer Football League – Division One
- 1985–1994: Farrer Football League – Division Two
- 1995–: Farrer Football League

== Notable players ==
The following former Farrer FL players played senior VFL / AFL football, with the year indicating their VFL / AFL debut.

Farrer Football League

- 1966: Doug Priest – Holbrook to South Melbourne
- 1969: John Pitura – Wagga to South Melbourne
- 1975: Colin Hounsell Collingullie to South Melbourne
- 1979: Wayne Carroll – Mangoplah Cookardinia United to South Melbourne
- 1980: Greg Smith – East Wagga to South Melbourne
- 1981: Brett Scott – The Rock-Yerong Creek to South Melbourne
- 1987: Michael Phyland – Mangoplah Cookardinia United to Sydney
- 1989: Glenn Page – Collingullie to Sydney
- 1995: Jason Wild – Collingullie to Collingwood
- 2000: Ben Fixter – Rivcoll to Sydney
- 2011: Luke Breust – Temora to Hawthorn
- 2011: Issac Smith – Temora to Hawthorn
- 2013: Jake Barrett – Temora to GWS

== Current clubs ==
Locations of the Farrer FL clubs

Club	Colours	Nickname	Home Ground	Former league	Est.	Years in FFL	FFL Senior Premierships	
Club	Colours	Nickname	Home Ground	Former league	Est.	Years in FFL	Total	Years
Barellan United		Two Blues	Barellan Sportsground, Barellan	CRFL, NRFNL	1970	1982-1992, 2015-	1	1987
Charles Sturt University (Rivcoll 1982-2000s)		Bushpigs	Peter Hastie Oval, Charles Sturt University	CRFL	1972	1982-	2	1991, 2001
Coleambally		Blues	Coleambally Sports Grounds, Coleambally	C&DFL	1965	2011-	0	–
East Wagga-Kooringal		Hawks	Gumly Oval, Gumly Gumly	CRFL, RFNL	1946	1977-1981, 2010-	2	2016, 2026
Marrar		Bombers	Langtry Oval, Marrar	CRFL	1918	1982-	5	1995, 1996, 2017, 2018, 2022
North Wagga		Saints	McPherson Oval, North Wagga Wagga	RFNL	1957	1958-1981; 1983-1994, 1998-2006; 2010-	5	1983, 1991, 1992, 1994, 2019
Northern Jets		Jets	Ardlethan Recreation Ground, Ardlethan and Ariah Park Recreation Ground, Ariah Park	–	2004	2004-	2	2005, 2007
Temora		Kangaroos	Nixon Park, Temora	CRFL, RFNL	1949	1961-1994; 2002-	4	2012, 2013, 2014, 2025
The Rock-Yerong Creek		Magpies	Victoria Park, The Rock	–	1962	1962-	10	1986, 1997, 1998, 2000, 2004, 2006, 2011, 2015, 2023, 2024

== Previous clubs ==
Club	Colours	Nickname	Home Ground	Former league	Est.	Years in FFL	FFL Senior Premierships		Fate
Club	Colours	Nickname	Home Ground	Former league	Est.	Years in FFL	Total	Years	Fate
Ardlethan		Stars	Ardlethan Recreation Ground, Ardlethan	RFNL	1907	1987-2003	0	-	Merged with Ariah Park-Mirrool to form Northern Jets following 2003 season
Ariah Park-Mirrool		Brown Bombers	Ariah Park Recreation Ground, Ariah Park	RFNL	1953	1991-2003	0	-	Merged with Ardlethan to form Northern Jets following 2003 season
Boree Creek		Creekers, Magpies	Boree Creak Recreation Reserve, Boree Creek	CRFL	1886	1982	0	-	Folded after 1982 season
Collingullie		Demons	Crossroads Oval, Collingullie	CRFL	1906	1965-1979	2	1969, 1974	Merged with Ashmont to form Collingullie-Ashmont following 1979 season
Collingullie-Ashmont		Demons	Crossroads Oval, Collingullie	–	1980	1980-1994	2	1982, 1984,	Moved to Riverina FNL following 1994 season
Collingullie-Ashmont-Kapooka		Demons	Crossroads Oval, Collingullie	–	1998	1998-2010	6	1999, 2002, 2003, 2008, 2009, 2010	Moved to Riverina FNL after 2010 season
Cootamundra		Blues	Clarke Oval, Cootamundra	SWDFL	1960	1982-2003	2	1989, 1992	Moved to AFL Canberra following 2003 season
Culcairn		Lions	Culcairn Sportsground, Culcairn	A&DFL	1895	1957-1980	2	1963, 1968	Moved to Tallangatta & District FL after 1980 season
Henty		Swans, Swampies	Henty Showground, Henty	A&DFL	1895	1957-1979	0	-	Moved to Hume FL after 1979 season
Holbrook		Brookers	Holbrook Sports Complex, Holbrook	A&DFL	1882	1957-1980	2	1964, 1970	Moved to Tallangatta & District FL after 1980 season
Lavington		Blues	Lavington Sports Ground, Hamilton Valley	HFL	1918	1977-1978	0	-	Moved to Ovens & Murray FL after 1978 season
Lockhart		Bulldogs	Lockhart Recreation Ground, Lockhart	A&DFL	1898	1958-1981	1	1960	Moved to Hume FL after 1982 season
Junee (Junee-Kapooka 1982-86)		Bulldogs	Laurie Daley Oval, Junee	A&DFL, CRFL	1919	1958-1959, 1982-1987, 1996-1997	1	1984	Played in Central Riverina FL between 1960-81. In recess between 1988 and 1995. Folded after 1997 season
Mangoplah Cookardinia United		Goannas	Mangoplah Sports Ground, Mangoplah	A&DFL	1955	1957-1994	12	1957, 1965, 1966, 1967, 1971, 1972, 1974, 1985, 1988, 1989, 1990, 1993	Moved to Riverina FNL after 1994 season
Royal Australian Air Force		Cats	RAAF Base Oval, Forest Hill	CRFL	1948	1982-1996	0	-	Merged with North Wagga to form North Wagga-RAAF following 1996 season
South Wagga-Tolland		Dons	Maher Oval, Glenfield Park	CRFL	1971	1982-1997	4	1983, 1988, 1990, 1994	Folded after 1997 season
The Rock		Magpies	Victoria Park, The Rock	A&DFL	1901	1958-1961	0	-	Merged with Yerong Creek to form The Rock-Yerong Creek following 1961 season
Tumut-Talbingo		Hawks	Tumut Recreation Reserve, Tumut	UMFL	1970	1986-1987	0	-	Folded midway through 1987 season
Uranquinty-Kapooka		Rosellas	Kapooka Oval, Kapooka	CRFL	1921	1985-1998	1	1993	Merged with Collingullie-Ashmont to form Collingullie-Ashmont-Kapooka following 1998 season
Wagga		Tigers	Robertson Oval, Wagga Wagga	A&DFL	1861	1958-1981	9	1958, 1959, 1961, 1962, 1975, 1977, 1978, 1980, 1981	Moved to Riverina FNL after 1981 season
Whitton-Yanco		Tigers	Whitton Recreation Ground, Whitton	CRFL	1890s	1982-1994	3	1985, 1986, 1987	Merged with Leeton to form Leeton-Whitton following 1994 season
Yerong Creek		Blue & Whites	Yerong Creek Sports Ground, Yerong Creek	A&DFL	1910	1957-1961	0	-	Merged with The Rock to form The Rock-Yerong Creek following 1961 season

== Leading & century goal kickers / League Best & Fairest Winners ==
Seniors

The Farrer FL senior football best and fairest medal was called the Baz Medal, which was first donated in 1952 by Mr. Mick Baz of Culcairn Cash Store as the award in the Albury & District Football League, which was carried on into the Farrer FL.

Year	Leading Goalkicker	H&A Goals	Finals Goals	Total Goals	Best & Fairest	Farrer FL Club	Total Votes
	Farrer Football League				Baz Medal		
1957					Hayden Hensel	Culcairn	
1958	Max Vickery (Culcairn)	68		68	Hayden Hensel	Calcairn	
1959	Max Vickery (Culcairn)	98		98	Rod Haberecht	Lockhart	
1960	Tim Robb (Wagga Tigers)	69		69	Les "Sonny" Morrow	Wagga	
1961	R Campbell (Wagga Tigers)	61		61	Harry Gardiner	Culcairn	35
1962	R Richardson (Temora)	52		52	Harry Gardiner	Culcairn	21
1963	Harry Gardiner (Culcairn)	65		65	Brian Czislowski	North Wagga	
1964	John Condon (TRYC)	62		62	Harry Gardiner	Culcairn	23
1965	Rex Burge (MCU)	70		70	Tony Beasley	North Wagga	18
1966	Rex Burge (MCU)	70		70	David Maher	MCU	25
1967	Rex Burge (MCU)	85		85	Allan Tipping	Collingullie	27
1968	Ken Morrow (Collingullie)	72	N/A	72	John Wright	Lockhart	29
1969	Barry Walker (TRYC)	118	N/A	118	Greg Hardie	North Wagga	26
	Ken Morrow (Collingullie)	101					
1970	Ken Morrow (Collingullie)	105			Greg Hardie	North Wagga	24
1971	Rex Burge (North Wagga)	100			John Kew	Collingullie	29
1972	Rex Burge (North Wagga)	73		73	Jeff Nimmo	Lockhart	27
1973	Greg Sheather (Wagga Tigers)	107		107	Jeff Nimmo	Lockhart	25
1974	Steve Goodwin (Lockhart)	111		111	Colin Hounsell	Collingullie	27
1975	Robert "Bob" Driscoll (TRYC)	82		82	Jeff Nimmo	Lockhart	22
1976	Laurie Pendrick (North Wagga)	114	13	127	Peter Elliott	TRYC	27
	R Driscoll (TRYC)	109					
1977	Laurie Pendrick (North Wagga)	133	9	159	Laurie Pendrick &	North Wagga	27
	L Cohalan (MCU)	101			Doug Priest	Wagga	27
1978	Greg Sheather (Wagga Tigers)	136	4	140	Greg Smith	E W K	21
	J Newton (Temora)	127					
	Laurie Pendrick (North Wagga)	102					
1979	Don Elliott (North Wagga)	113	9	122	Richard Hamilton	Holbrook	32
1980	Allan Breust (Temora)	108	0	108	Gary McDougall	Temora	27
1981	Greg Sheather (Wagga Tigers)	92	0	92	George Galvin	E W K	19
	Riverina DISTRICT Football League				Gerald Clear Medal		
1982	Stephen Cole (MCU)	144	5	149	Bruce Rollins	Marrar	
	Riverina DISTRICT FL – Division One				Gerald Clear Medal		
1983	Martin King (North Wagga)	111	0	111	Laurie Pendrick	North Wagga	22
1984	Warren McLoughlin (CA)	85	15	100	Danny Malone	Marrar	21
	Farrer FL: Division One				Gerald Clear Medal		
1985	John McGregor (North Wagga)	102	0	102	Phil Reid	Temora	25
1986	Trevor Ion (MCU)	113	0	113	Danny Malone	Marrar	
1987	Richard Flanigan (TRYC)	76	0	76	Ray Block	Temora	18
1988	Terry Gillett (CAK)	106		106	Ian Lucas	Barellan	19
1989	Stephen Cole (MCU) &	68		68	Mark Hodgson	Barellan	
	Dick Carey (North Wagga)	68		68			
1990	Mark Hofert (North Wagga)	108		108	Michael Condon	TRYC	24
1991	Mark Hofert (North Wagga)	117		117	Paul Irvine	North Wagga	15
1992	Mark Hofert (North Wagga)	116		116	Brian Hawke	MCU	16
1993	Mark Hofert (North Wagga)	70		70	Todd Goldspink	TRYC	17
1994	Paul McCarty (Ardlethan)	126		126	Brett Page	North Wagga	28
	Farrer Football League				Gerald Clear Medal		
1995	Mark Hofert (TRYC)	81	0	81	Shaun Nesbitt	Rivoll	24
1996	John Read (Cootamundra)	159	16	175	Glen Traecy	Ariah Park M	24
1997	John Read(Cootamundra)	75		75	Phil Guthrie	Cootamundra	25
1998	Glenn Bench (Ardlethan)	83		83	Matthew Currie	Ardelthan	27
1999	Jamie Pitt (CAK)	102	5	107	Brad Aiken	CAK	23
2000	Matt Carroll (TRYC)	109	0	109	Kane Johnstone	CAK	22
2001	Anthony Carroll (Rivcoll)	75	0	75	Shane Lenon	CAK	32
2002	Mick McPherson (Temora)	62	0	62	Brad Aiken	CAK	29
2003	Matt Carroll (TRYC)	125	0	125	N McDonald	Rivoll	25
2004	Jason Brown (TRYC)	88	0	88	Brad Aiken	CAK	21
2005	Jason Brown (TRYC)	78	5	83	Matt Robertson	Northern Jets	21
2006	Jason Brown (TRYC)	90	0	90	Chris Gow	CAK	34
2007	Robert Harper (Northern Jets)	107	0	107	Jarrod Gornall	Marrar	20
2008	Marc Geppert (CAK)	85	14	99	Nathan McDonald	TRYC	24
2009	Marc Geppert (CAK)	78	24	102	Brad Aiken	CAK	23
2010	Marc Geppert (CAK)	91	14	105	Brad Langtry	Marrar	24
2011	Christopher Jackson (EWK)	49	0	49	Ryan Bull &	Coleambally	22
					Brad Langtry	Marrar	22
2012	Jason Brown (TRYC)	64	7	71	Chris Block	Temora	16
2013	Luke Webb (TRYC)	60	2	62	Clint Taylor	Marrar	22
2014	Marc Geppert (EWK)	82	13	95	Dean Pound	Coleambally	28
2015	Marc Geppert (EWK)	111	10	121	Cory Watt	North Wagga	20
2016	Marc Geppert (EWK)	101	10	111	Nick Hull	EWK	32
2017	Matt Harpley (Temora)	60	0	60	Mitch Haddrill	Northern Jets	19
2018	Matthew Wallis (Temora)	63	4	67	Nick Hull	EWK	29
2019	Christopher Ladhams (EWK)	61	7	68	Mitch Haddrill	Northern Jets	25
2020	FFNL in recess due to COVID-19.						
2021	Jamie Lawton (Marrar)	78	N/A	78	Harry Fitzsimmons	EWK	17
2022	Nathan Dennis (N Wagga Saints)	55	8	63	Riley Budd	TRYC	23
2023	Matt Wallis (Northern Jets)	68	4	72	Zach Walgers	Marrar	25
2024	James Roberts (TRYC)	63	6	69	Will Reinhold	Temora	
2025	Andrew Swan (EWK)	85	10	95	Will Reinhold	Temora	26
2026	Jack Harper (N Jets)	65	N/A	65	Riley Irvin	(Barellan)	15
2027							
Year	Leading Goalkicker	H&A Goals	Finals Goals	Total Goals	Best & Fairest	Farrer FL Club	Total Votes

== List of football premiers ==
The Farrer Football League's first grand final was in 1957 and the best on ground player now receives the award, which was first awarded in ?. The grand final venue has been played at Robertson Oval, Wagga Wagga since at least 2012 (via the Gameday website).

=== First-Grade ===
Season	Farrer FNL - Senior Football Grand Final Information				Minor Premiers
Season	Premiers	Score (Margin)	Runners-Up	Best on Ground Schmidt-Nitschke Medal	Minor Premiers
	Farrer FL
1957	Mangoplah-Cookardinia United		Holbrook
1958	Wagga	14.11.95 – 11.9.75 (20 points)	Mangoplah-Cookardinia United
1959	Wagga	14.9.93 – 10.9.69 (24 points)	Lockhart
1960	Lockhart	15.14.104 – 14.10 94 (10 points)	Wagga		Wagga: 18 wins/0 losses/0 draws
1961	Wagga	14.17.101 – 11.12.78 (23 points)	Culcairn		Wagga: 17/1
1962	Wagga	8.7.55-3.8 – 26 (29 points)	Culcairn		Culcairn: 15/3
1963	Culcairn	15.12.102 – 8.12.60 (42 points)	Temora		Culcairn: 14/2
1964	Holbrook	14.18.102 – 9.17.71 (31 points)	Temora		The Rock Yerong Creek: 13/3
1965	Mangoplah-Cookardinia United	15.10.100 – 8.11.59 (41 points)	Wagga		Wagga: 14/4
1966	Mangoplah-Cookardinia United	8.9.57 – 4.18.42 (15 points)	Collingullie		Mangoplah-Cookardinia United: 16/2
1967	Mangoplah-Cookardinia United	? (Drawn grand final)	Collingullie		Mangoplah-Cookardinia United: 15/3
1967	Mangoplah-Cookardinia United	8.11.59 – 7.11.53 (6 points: grand final replay)	Collingullie		Mangoplah-Cookardinia United: 15/3
1968	Culcairn	15.15.105 – 9.8.62 (43 points)	Lockhart		Lockhart: 14/4
1969	Collingullie	11.11.77 – 9.8.62 (15 points)	Mangoplah-Cookardinia United		Wagga: 15/3
1970	Holbrook	17.16.118 – 12.17.89 (29 points)	Collingullie		Holbrook: 15/3
1971	Mangoplah-Cookardinia United	20.13.133 – 11.15.81 (52 points)	Henty		Henty: 15/3
1972	Mangoplah-Cookardinia United	18.19.127 – 12.15.87 (40 points)	Wagga		Wagga: 14/4
1973	North Wagga	16.19.115 – 11.9.75 (40 points)	Henty		North Wagga:
1974	Mangoplah-Cookardinia United	18.9.117 – 17.15.117 (drawn grand final)	Collingullie		Collingullie:
1974	Collingullie	16.16.112 – 14.15-99 (grand final replay:13 points)	Mangoplah-Cookardinia United
1975	Wagga	15.19.109 – 10.14.74 (35 points)	Henty		North Wagga:
1976	North Wagga	17.15.117 – 12.14.84 (33 points)	Collingullie		North Wagga: 15/3
1977	Wagga		North Wagga		Wagga: 19/1
1978	Wagga		Mangoplah-Cookardinia United		Wagga: 19/1
1979	East Wagga Kooringal	18.12.120 – 14.19.103 (17 points)	Wagga		East Wagga Kooringal: 17/3
1980	Wagga	13.11-89 – 11.9.75 (14 points)	East Wagga Kooringal		East Wagga Kooringal: 15/3
1981	Wagga	10.17.77 – 11.10.76 (1 points)	Mangoplah-Cookardinia United		Wagga: 17/?
	Riverina DISTRICT FL
1982	Collingullie-Ashmont	14.14.98 – 12.16.88 (10 points)	Mangoplah-Cookardinia United		Mangoplah-Cookardinia United:
	Riverina DISTRICT FL: Division One
1983	North Wagga	25.15.155 – 17.15.117 (38 points)	Mangoplah-Cookardinia United		North Wagga:
1984	Collingullie-Ashmont	16.20.116 – 11.16.82 (34 points)	Mangoplah-Cookardinia United		Mangoplah-Cookardinia United:
	FARRER FL: Division One
1985	Mangoplah-Cookardinia United	16.14.110 – 10.10.70 (40 points)	Collingullie-Ashmont		Mangoplah-Cookardinia United:
1986	The Rock-Yerong Creek	10.8.68 – 9.12.66 (2 points)	Mangoplah-Cookardinia United		The Rock-Yerong Creek:
1987	Barellan United	18.14.132 – 10.8.68 (64 points)	Mangoplah-Cookardinia United		Barellan United:
1988	Mangoplah-Cookardinia United	12.7.79 – 10.9.69 (10 points)	Collingullie-Ashmont		Mangoplah-Cookardinia United:
1989	Mangoplah-Cookardinia United	10.11.71 – 8.11.59 (12 points)	Barellan United		Barellan United:
1990	Mangoplah-Cookardinia United	18.9.117 – 9.11.65 (52 points)	North Wagga		Mangoplah-Cookardinia United:
1991	North Wagga	16.14.110 – 7.14.56 (54 points)	Ariah Park-Mirrool		North Wagga:
1992	North Wagga	10.12.72 – 9.11.65 (7 points)	Mangoplah-Cookardinia United		North Wagga:
1993	Mangoplah-Cookardinia United	19.20.134 – 10.8.68 (66 points)	North Wagga		Marrar:
1994	North Wagga	15.13.103 – 12.9.81 (22 points)	Mangoplah-Cookardinia United		North Wagga:
	Farrer FL
1995	Marrar	12.8.80 – 7.15.57 (23 points)	The Rock-Yerong Creek		Marrar:
1996	Marrar	13.10.88 – 12.8.80 (8 points)	Ariah Park-Mirrool		Marrar:
1997	The Rock-Yerong Creek	16.15.111 – 16.9.105 (6 points)	Ariah Park-Mirrool		Marrar:
1998	The Rock-Yerong Creek	13.13.91 – 8.9.57 (34 points)	Ardlethan		The Rock-Yerong Creek:
1999	Collingullie-Ashmont-Kapooka	19.13.127 – 12.11.83 (44 points)	Ardlethan		The Rock-Yerong Creek:
2000	The Rock-Yerong Creek	9.13.67 – 5.7.37 (30 points)	Marrar		The Rock-Yerong Creek:
2001	Rivcoll	10.10.70 – 9.10.64 (6 points)	Ariah Park-Mirrool		Collingullie-Ashmont-Kapooka:
2002	Collingullie-Ashmont-Kapooka	20.19.139 – 12.12.84 (55 points)	Ardlethan		Collingullie-Ashmont-Kapooka:
2003	Collingullie-Ashmont-Kapooka	12.9.81 – 10.14.74 (7 points)	The Rock-Yerong Creek		Collingullie-Ashmont-Kapooka:
2004	The Rock-Yerong Creek	10.9.69 – 8.9.57 (12 points)	North Wagga		North Wagga:
2005	Northern Jets	13.10.88 – 7.15.57 (31 points)	Collingullie-Ashmont-Kapooka		Northern Jets:
2006	The Rock-Yerong Creek	20.13.133 – 15.9.99 (34 points)	Collingullie-Ashmont-Kapooka		The Rock-Yerong Creek:
2007	Northern Jets	15.22.112 – 15.15.105 (7 points)	Collingullie-Ashmont-Kapooka		Northern Jets:
2008	Collingullie-Ashmont-Kapooka	22.16.148 – 10.7.67 (81 points)	The Rock-Yerong Creek		Collingullie-Ashmont-Kapooka:
2009	Collingullie-Ashmont-Kapooka	12.19.91 – 8.9.57 (34 points)	Marrar		Collingullie-Ashmont-Kapooka:
2010	Collingullie-Ashmont-Kapooka	17.19.121 – 1.3.9 (112 points)	Marrar		Collingullie-Ashmont-Kapooka:
2011	The Rock-Yerong Creek	13.8.86 – 10.12.72 (14 points)	Marrar		Marrar:
2012	Temora	14.7.91 – 12.1.73 (18 points)	The Rock-Yerong Creek		Temora: (14/2)
2013	Temora	12.14.86 – 11.4.70 (16 points)	The Rock-Yerong Creek		The Rock-Yerong Creek: (14/2)
2014	Temora	15.10.100 – 5.10.40 (60 points)	East Wagga-Kooringal		Temora: (12/4)
2015	The Rock-Yerong Creek	12.4.76 – 10.10.70 (6 points)	East Wagga-Kooringal		East Wagga-Kooringal: (16/0)
2016	East Wagga-Kooringal	11.12.78 – 5.8.38 (40 points)	Coleambally		East Wagga-Kooringal: (14/1/1)
2017	Marrar	7.10.52 – 7.6.48 (4 points)	Temora		Marrar: (14/2)
2018	Marrar	8.8.56 – 6.8.44 (12 points)	North Wagga		Marrar: (15/1)
2019	North Wagga	13.8.87 – 10.7.67 (20 points)	East Wagga-Kooringal	Cayden Winter (Nth Wagga)	North Wagga: (14/2)
2020	(Farrer FNL in recess due to COVID-19)
2021	1st: Marrar	No finals series?	2nd: East Wagga-Kooringal		Marrar: (15/1)
2022	Marrar	13.11.89 – 8.2.50 (39 points)	The Rock Yerong Creek	Jordan Headington (Marrar)	Marrar: (14/1/1)
2023	The Rock-Yerong Creek	9.5.59 – 7.10.52 (7 points)	Northern Jets	Liam Lupton (The Rock Yerong Creek)	The Rock-Yerong Creek: (15/1)
2024	The Rock-Yerong Creek	12.8.80 – 9.4.58 (22 points)	Marrar	Don Roberts (The Rock-Yerong Creek)	The Rock-Yerong Creek: (14/2)
2025	Temora	10.13.73 – 9.9.63 (10 points)	East Wagga-Kooringal	Joe Morton (Temora)	East Wagga-Kooringal: (16/0)
2026	East Wagga-Kooringal	13.10.88 - 8.4.52 (36 points)	Marrar	Alex Page (East Wagga-Kooringal)	East Wagga-Kooringal: (16/0)
Season	Premier	Score	Runner Up	Best on Ground	Minor Premier

=== Reserve-Grade ===
- 1957: MCU d Culcairn
- 1958: Wagga d Henty
- 1959: Wagga d Henty
- 1960: Henty d Wagga
- 1961: Henty d The Rock
- 1962: Culcairn d Wagga
- 1963: Henty d Holbrook
- 1964: Wagga d Holbrook
- 1965: Wagga d North Wagga
- 1966: Holbrook d Wagga
- 1967: Lockhart d Wagga
- 1968: Wagga d TRYC
- 1969: TRYC d Wagga
- 1970: Wagga d TRYC
- 1971: Holbrook d Henty
- 1972: TRYC d Culcairn
- 1973: Culcairn d MCU
- 1974: MCU d TRYC
- 1975: Wagga d MCU
- 1976: Wagga d Nth Wagga
- 1977: Wagga d Nth Wagga
- 1978: North Wagga d Wagga
- 1979: EWK d Wagga
- 1980: Wagga d Temora
- 1981: North Wagga d Wagga
- 1982: Junee-Kapooka
- 1983: Mangoplah-Cookardinia United
- 1984: Mangoplah-Cookardinia United
- 1985: Temora
- 1986: Temora
- 1987: Temora
- 1988: Barellan United
- 1989: The Rock-Yerong Creek
- 1990: The Rock-Yerong Creek
- 1991: Mangoplah-Cookardinia United
- 1992: Collingullie-Ashmont
- 1993: North Wagga
- 1994: North Wagga
- 1995: Marrar
- 1996: Ariah Park-Mirrool
- 1997: Cootamundra
- 1998: Ariah Park-Mirrool
- 1999: Ariah Park-Mirrool
- 2000: The Rock-Yerong Creek
- 2001: Collingullie-Ashmont-Kapooka
- 2002: Collingullie-Ashmont-Kapooka
- 2003: Ariah Park-Mirrool
- 2004: North Wagga
- 2005: Northern Jets
- 2006: Northern Jets
- 2007: Northern Jets
- 2008: Collingullie-Ashmont-Kapooka
- 2009: Rivcoll
- 2010: Charles Sturt University
- 2011: Marrar
- 2012: The Rock-Yerong Creek d North Wagga
- 2013: North Wagga d Temora
- 2014: East Wagga-Kooringal d Temora
- 2015: East Wagga-Kooringal d The Rock-Yerong Creek
- 2016: East Wagga-Kooringal d North Wagga
- 2017: North Wagga d Marrar
- 2018: Marrar d North Wagga
- 2019: East Wagga-Kooringal d North Wagga
- 2020: In recess > COVID-19
- 2021: 1st: Marrar. No finals > COVID-19
- 2022: Marrar d Charles Sturt University
- 2023: The Rock-Yerong Creek d Charles Sturt University
- 2024: Charles Sturt University d East Wagga-Kooringal
- 2025: Charles Sturt University d East Wagga-Kooringal
- 2026: The Rock-Yerong Creek d Charles Sturt University

=== Under 19's ===
- 1980: RAAF d EWK
- 1981: MCU d Wagga
- 1982: Mangoplah-Cookardinia United
- 1983: South Wagga-Tolland
- 1984: Mangoplah-Cookardinia United
- 1985: Mangoplah-Cookardinia United
- 1986: The Rock-Yerong Creek
- 1987: Collingullie-Ashmont
- 1988: Collingullie-Ashmont
- 1989: Mangoplah-Cookardinia United
- 1990: Mangoplah-Cookardinia United
- 1991: Mangoplah-Cookardinia United
- 1992: Temora
- 1993: Temora
- 1994: Temora

==== Under 17s/18s ====
- 1995:
- 1996:
- 1997:
- 1998:
- 1999:
- 2000:
- 2001:
- 2002:
- 2003:
- 2004:
- 2005:
- 2006:
- 2007:
- 2008:
- 2009: Northern Jets
- 2010: North Wagga
- 2011: Temora
- 2012: North Wagga d MCU
- 2013: No Competition
- 2014: North Wagga d Northern Jets
- 2015: Northern Jets d North Wagga
- 2016: North Wagga d Marrar
- 2017: Temora d North Wagga
- 2018: Marrar d North Wagga
- 2019: Marrar d East Wagga Kooringal
- 2020: FFNL in recess > COVID-19
- 2021: 1st: North Wagga. No finals > COVID-19
- 2022: Northern Jets d North Wagga
- 2023: Marrar d North Wagga
- 2024: Marrar d North Wagga
- 2025: Coleambally d North Wagga
- 2026: Coleambally d North Wagga

== Riverina District / Farrer FL Division Two Grand Finals ==
Seniors

Season	Grand Final Information			Minor Premiers
Season	Premiers	Score (Margin)	Runners-Up	Minor Premiers
	Riverina DISTRICT FL: Division Two
1983	South Wagga Tolland	23.15.153 d 12.13.85 (68 points)	Junee Kapooka
1984	Junee – Kapooka		Rivcoll
	Farrer FL: Division Two
1985	Whitton		Junee Kapooka	Whitton: 16 wins / 2 losses
1986	Whitton		Cootamundra	Whitton: 12/2
1987	Whitton		Cootamundra	Cootamundra 14/0
1988	South Wagga-Tolland		Cootamundra	Cootamundra: 13/2
1989	Cootamundra		South Wagga-Tolland	South Wagga-Tolland 15/0
1990	South Wagga-Tolland		Cootamundra	Cootamundra: 13/2
1991	Rivcoll		Cootamundra	Rivcoll: 12/3
1992	Cootamundra		RAAF	Cootamundra: 42 points
1993	Uranquinty-Kapooka		Cootamundra	South Wagga Tolland: ?
1994	South Wagga-Tolland		RAAF	South Wagga Tolland: 12/3

- In 1995, the Farrer Football League became a one division senior football competition.

== Leading & century goal kickers / League Best & Fairest Winners ==
Riverina District FL / Farrer FL – Division Two
Seniors

Year	Leading Goalkicker	Club	Goals	Best & Fairest	Club	Total Votes
	Riverina DISTRICT FL: Division 2			Alan Carroll Memorial Medal		
1983	Rob Barrett	Boree Creek	101	Mick Dasey	South Wagga Tolland	20
1984	Ralph Robins	Whitton	59	Ron Nieuwendyk	Cootamundra	13
	Farrer FL: Division 2			Alan Carroll Memorial Medal		
1985	Ralph Robins	Whitton	130	Martin Simpson	Whitton	21
	M Spencer	Junee Kapooka	101			
1986	Scott "Jack" Lang	Boree Creek	74	Gavin Lloyd	Whitton	22
1987	Mark Hofert	South Wagga Tolland	46	Wayne Gardner	South Wagga Tolland	
1988	Eric Frazier	South Wagga Tolland	75	Colin Ingram	Whitton	17
1989	Don Oliver	Cootamundra	64	Errol Boots	Whitton	21
1990	Ian Marston	Uranquinity Kapooka	63?	David Hodge	Rivcoll	16
1991	Neil Lane	Rivcoll	68	Darren McDonald	Uranquinity Kapooka	17
1992	Brad Guthrie	Cootamundra	66	David Hodge	Rivcoll	
1993	Wayne Gardner	South Wagga Tolland	88	Craig McLachlan	South Wagga Tolland	19
1994	Michael Wright	Whitton	48	Danny Jacques	Cootamundra	14

- Goals tally does not include goals kicked in the finals series.
- In 1995, the Farrer Football League became a one division competition.
- MOST GOALS IN A MATCH: 1988 – Eric Frazer – South Wagga Tolland v RAAF at Forest Hill, 13 August 1988.

== 2010 Ladder ==
Seniors

Farrer FL	Wins	Byes	Losses	Draws	For	Against	%	Pts	Final	Team	G	B	Pts	Team	G	B	Pts
Collingullie AK	16	0	0	0	1918	829	231.36%	64	Elimination	Eastern Hawks	9	15	69	Northern Jets	17	9	111
The Rock Yerong Creek	12	0	4	0	1513	1084	139.58%	48	Qualifying	The Rock Yerong Creek	5	7	37	Marrar	10	11	71
Marrar	10	0	6	0	1296	1251	103.60%	40	1st semi	The Rock Yerong Creek	14	12	96	Northern Jets	10	7	67
Eastern Hawks	7	0	9	0	1253	1409	88.93%	28	2nd semi	Collingullie AK	18	6	114	Marrar	12	6	78
Northern Jets	6	0	10	0	1072	1235	86.80%	24	Preliminary	Marrar	8	10	58	The Rock Yerong Creek	3	5	23
North Wagga	6	0	10	0	1063	1350	78.74%	24	Grand	Collingullie AK	17	19	121	Marrar	1	3	9
Temora	4	0	12	0	1218	1696	71.82%	16									
Charles Sturt University	3	0	13	0	896	1475	60.75%	12									

== 2011 Ladder ==
Farrer FL	Wins	Byes	Losses	Draws	For	Against	%	Pts	Final	Team	G	B	Pts	Team	G	B	Pts
Marrar	15	0	1	0	1808	1084	166.79%	60	Elimination	North Wagga	13	16	94	Charles Sturt University	11	14	80
The Rock Yerong Creek	13	0	3	0	1672	1219	137.16%	52	Qualifying	The Rock Yerong Creek	11	14	80	Eastern Hawks	9	5	59
Eastern Hawks	11	0	5	0	1530	1133	135.04%	44	1st semi	Eastern Hawks	17	17	119	North Wagga	15	5	95
North Wagga	8	0	8	0	1322	1509	87.61%	32	2nd semi	Marrar	14	11	95	The Rock Yerong Creek	12	9	81
Charles Sturt University	7	0	8	1	1260	1321	95.38%	30	Preliminary	The Rock Yerong Creek	15	10	100	Eastern Hawks	5	9	39
Temora	4	0	12	0	1373	1758	78.10%	16	Grand	The Rock Yerong Creek	13	8	86	Marrar	10	12	72
Northern Jets	3	0	12	1	1112	1498	74.23%	14									
Coleambally	2	0	14	0	1039	1594	65.18%	8									

== 2012 Ladder ==
Farrer FL	Wins	Byes	Losses	Draws	For	Against	%	Pts	Final	Team	G	B	Pts	Team	G	B	Pts
Temora	14	0	2	0	1729	874	197.83%	56	Elimination	Marrar	9	9	63	North Wagga	9	6	60
The Rock Yerong Creek	13	0	3	0	1532	773	198.19%	52	Qualifying	The Rock Yerong Creek	17	10	112	Eastern Hawks	7	9	51
Eastern Hawks	9	0	7	0	1340	1351	99.19%	36	1st semi	Marrar	13	19	97	Eastern Hawks	5	10	40
Marrar	8	0	8	0	1210	1122	107.84%	32	2nd semi	Temora	14	11	95	The Rock Yerong Creek	8	8	56
North Wagga	6	0	10	0	1081	1363	79.31%	24	Preliminary	The Rock Yerong Creek	10	8	68	Marrar	8	13	61
Charles Sturt University	6	0	10	0	1167	1587	73.53%	24	Grand	Temora	14	7	91	The Rock Yerong Creek	12	1	73
Northern Jets	5	0	11	0	1115	1344	82.96%	20									
Coleambally	3	0	13	0	927	1687	54.95%	12									

== 2013 Ladder ==
Farrer FL	Wins	Byes	Losses	Draws	For	Against	%	Pts	Final	Team	G	B	Pts	Team	G	B	Pts
The Rock Yerong Creek	14	0	2	0	1570	952	164.92%	56	Elimination	Marrar	12	11	83	East Wagga-Kooringal	7	8	50
Temora	13	0	3	0	1700	770	220.78%	52	Qualifying	Temora	16	11	107	Northern Jets	5	8	38
Northern Jets	11	0	5	0	1365	1170	116.67%	44	1st semi	Northern Jets	13	11	89	Marrar	8	10	58
Marrar	9	0	7	0	1066	1201	88.76%	36	2nd semi	Temora	11	9	75	The Rock Yerong Creek	5	8	38
East Wagga-Kooringal	8	0	8	0	1298	1225	105.96%	32	Preliminary	The Rock Yerong Creek	14	7	91	Northern Jets	9	9	63
North Wagga	3	0	13	0	913	1366	66.84%	12	Grand	Temora	12	14	86	The Rock Yerong Creek	11	4	70
Coleambally	3	0	13	0	942	1459	64.56%	12									
Charles Sturt University	3	0	13	0	954	1665	57.30%	12									

== 2014 Ladder ==
Farrer FL	Wins	Byes	Losses	Draws	For	Against	%	Pts	Final	Team	G	B	Pts	Team	G	B	Pts
Marrar	15	0	1	0	1808	1084	166.79%	60	Elimination	North Wagga	13	16	94	Charles Sturt University	11	14	80
The Rock Yerong Creek	13	0	3	0	1672	1219	137.16%	52	Qualifying	The Rock Yerong Creek	11	14	80	East Wagga-Kooringal	9	5	59
East Wagga-Kooringal	11	0	5	0	1530	1133	135.04%	44	1st semi	East Wagga-Kooringal	17	17	119	North Wagga	15	5	95
North Wagga	8	0	8	0	1322	1509	87.61%	32	2nd semi	Marrar	24	22	166	The Rock Yerong Creek	12	9	81
Charles Sturt University	7	0	8	1	1260	1321	95.38%	30	Preliminary	The Rock Yerong Creek	15	10	100	East Wagga-Kooringal	5	9	39
Temora	4	0	12	0	1373	1758	78.10%	16	Grand	The Rock Yerong Creek	13	8	86	Marrar	10	12	72
Northern Jets	3	0	12	1	1112	1498	74.23%	14									
Coleambally	2	0	14	0	1039	1594	65.18%	8									

== 2015 Ladder ==
Farrer FL	Wins	Byes	Losses	Draws	For	Against	%	Pts	Final	Team	G	B	Pts	Team	G	B	Pts
East Wagga-Kooringal	16	2	0	0	1882	649	289.98%	72	Elimination	Coleambally	10	12	72	Temora	9	12	66
The Rock Yerong Creek	11	2	5	0	1542	888	173.65%	52	Qualifying	The Rock Yerong Creek	14	7	91	North Wagga	7	8	50
North Wagga	10	2	6	0	1243	947	131.26%	48	1st semi	North Wagga	15	8	98	Coleambally	6	7	43
Temora	9	2	7	0	1385	938	147.65%	44	2nd semi	The Rock Yerong Creek	13	8	86	East Wagga-Kooringal	10	3	63
Coleambally	8	2	8	0	1249	1153	108.33%	40	Preliminary	East Wagga-Kooringal	13	9	87	North Wagga	5	2	32
Marrar	8	2	8	0	1084	1046	103.63%	40	Grand	The Rock Yerong Creek	12	4	76	East Wagga-Kooringal	10	10	70
Northern Jets	8	2	8	0	1189	1166	101.97%	40									
Charles Sturt University	1	2	15	0	639	2022	31.60%	12									
Barellan United	1	2	15	0	603	2007	30.04%	12									

== 2016 Ladder ==
Farrer FL	Wins	Byes	Losses	Draws	For	Against	%	Pts	Final	Team	G	B	Pts	Team	G	B	Pts
East Wagga-Kooringal	14	2	1	1	1681	719	233.80%	66	Elimination	Northern Jets	13	13	91	Marrar	11	15	81
The Rock Yerong Creek	13	2	2	1	1718	954	180.08%	62	Qualifying	Coleambally	4	12	36	The Rock Yerong Creek	2	3	15
Coleambally	12	2	4	0	1145	846	135.34%	56	1st semi	Northern Jets	10	10	70	The Rock Yerong Creek	9	10	64
Northern Jets	9	2	7	0	1278	1038	123.12%	44	2nd semi	East Wagga-Kooringal	11	17	83	Coleambally	4	8	32
Marrar	8	2	8	0	1005	1089	92.29%	40	Preliminary	Coleambally	11	8	74	Northern Jets	11	7	73
North Wagga	7	2	9	0	1218	1075	113.30%	36	Grand	East Wagga-Kooringal	11	12	78	Coleambally	5	8	38
Temora	5	2	11	0	989	1488	66.47%	28									
Charles Sturt University	2	2	14	0	806	1465	55.02%	16									
Barellan United	1	2	15	0	701	1867	37.55%	12									

== 2017 Ladder ==
Farrer FL	Wins	Byes	Losses	Draws	For	Against	%	Pts	Final	Team	G	B	Pts	Team	G	B	Pts
Marrar	14	0	2	0	1571	794	197.86%	56	Elimination	East Wagga-Kooringal	9	4	58	The Rock Yerong Creek	8	7	55
Temora	12	0	4	0	1515	1044	145.11%	48	Qualifying	Temora	14	10	94	North Wagga	13	8	86
North Wagga	11	0	5	0	1300	904	143.81%	44	1st semi	East Wagga-Kooringal	11	16	82	North Wagga	9	6	60
The Rock Yerong Creek	9	0	7	0	1413	1078	131.08%	36	2nd semi	Temora	12	12	84	Marrar	9	8	62
East Wagga-Kooringal	8	0	8	0	1204	1121	107.40%	32	Preliminary	Marrar	11	10	76	East Wagga-Kooringal	3	11	29
Northern Jets	7	0	9	0	1106	1078	102.60%	28	Grand	Marrar	7	10	52	Temora	7	6	48
Charles Sturt University	6	0	10	0	898	1439	62.40%	24									
Coleambally	3	0	13	0	732	1585	46.18%	12									
Barellan United	2	0	14	0	870	1566	55.56%	8									

== 2018 Ladder ==
Farrer FL	Wins	Byes	Losses	Draws	For	Against	%	Pts	Final	Team	G	B	Pts	Team	G	B	Pts
Marrar	15	2	1	0	1659	705	235.32%	68	Elimination	East Wagga-Kooringal	12	6	78	Charles Sturt University	6	10	46
North Wagga	14	2	2	0	1665	669	248.88%	64	Qualifying	North Wagga	18	10	118	Temora	9	4	58
Temora	11	2	5	0	1477	1007	146.67%	52	1st semi	Temora	7	9	51	East Wagga-Kooringal	6	10	46
East Wagga-Kooringal	10	2	6	0	1153	882	130.73%	48	2nd semi	Marrar	11	8	74	North Wagga	9	9	63
Charles Sturt University	9	2	7	0	1279	1085	117.88%	44	Preliminary	North Wagga	12	14	86	Temora	6	9	45
Northern Jets	5	2	11	0	1025	1263	81.16%	28	Grand	Marrar	8	8	56	North Wagga	6	8	44
The Rock Yerong Creek	4	2	12	0	990	1373	72.10%	24									
Barellan United	3	2	13	0	964	1607	59.99%	20									
Coleambally	1	2	15	0	416	2037	20.42%	12									

== 2019 Ladder ==
Farrer FL	Wins	Byes	Losses	Draws	For	Against	%	Pts	Final	Team	G	B	Pts	Team	G	B	Pts
North Wagga	14	2	2	0	1210	718	168.52%	64	Elimination	Temora	12	8	80	Coleambally	5	4	34
Marrar	14	2	2	0	1382	854	161.83%	64	Qualifying	East Wagga-Kooringal	12	11	83	Marrar	10	6	66
East Wagga-Kooringal	11	2	4	1	1320	963	137.07%	54	1st semi	Marrar	15	11	101	Temora	8	9	57
Temora	10	2	6	0	1190	926	128.51%	48	2nd semi	East Wagga-Kooringal	9	9	63	North Wagga	7	6	48
Coleambally	7	2	9	0	1057	1280	82.58%	36	Preliminary	North Wagga	7	6	48	Marrar	1	10	16
Charles Sturt University	5	2	11	0	1064	1205	88.30%	28	Grand	North Wagga	13	9	87	East Wagga-Kooringal	10	7	67
Northern Jets	5	2	11	0	1060	1562	67.86%	28									
The Rock Yerong Creek	4	2	12	0	1103	1316	83.81%	24									
Barellan United	1	2	14	1	829	1391	59.60%	14									

== See also ==
- AFL Canberra
- AFL NSW/ACT
- Albury & District Football League
- Australian rules football in New South Wales
- Hume Football League
- Northern Riverina Football League
- South West Football League (New South Wales)
- Riverina Football League
- Group 9 Rugby League
- Group 17 Rugby League
