= Geoff Neil =

Australian rules footballer, born 1909

Personal information
- Full name: Geoff Neil
- Born: 3 May 1909
- Died: 7 June 1974 (aged 65)
- Original team: Leeton
- Height: 166 cm (5 ft 5 in)
- Weight: 77 kg (170 lb)
- Position: Wing

Playing career^{1}
Years	Club	Games (Goals)
1931–33	St Kilda	32 (16)
- ^{1} Playing statistics correct to the end of 1933.

Geoff Neil (3 May 1909 – 7 June 1974) was an Australian rules footballer who played with St Kilda in the Victorian Football League (VFL).
