= Greg Smith (Australian footballer) =

Australian rules footballer

Personal information
- Born: 25 March 1957 (age 69); Ardlethan, New South Wales
- Original teams: Ardlethan Stars, East Wagga Wagga
- Height: 180 cm (5 ft 11 in)
- Weight: 73 kg (161 lb)
- Position: Centre

Playing career^{1}
Years	Club	Games (Goals)
1980–1984	South Melbourne/Sydney	96 (64)
1985–1986	Collingwood	31 (7)
1987–1992	Central Districts	100 (90)
Total		227 (161)
- ^{1} Playing statistics correct to the end of 1986.

Greg Smith (born 25 March 1957) is a former Australian rules footballer who played with the South Melbourne/Sydney and Collingwood Football Clubs in the Victorian Football League (VFL) during the 1980s.

Smith played all his junior and senior football with Ardlethan Football Club in the South West Football League (New South Wales), before playing with East Wagga Wagga in 1978 and 1979. Smith won the Farrer Football League best and fairest award, the Baz Medal in 1978, with East Wagga.

Rarely troubled by injury, Smith played at least 18 games in each of his five seasons at South Melbourne, earning him the nickname 'The Bionic Man'. He had come to the club from East Wagga and played his football mostly as a centreman or ruck-rover. Smith kicked 22 goals in 1982, five of them in a win over St Kilda at the SCG. He also polled well in the Brownlow Medal count that year with 11 votes, the second most for his club that season behind Barry Round.

Smith finished his career in the SANFL where he played 100 games and kicked 90 goals for Central District. He debuted for them in 1987 and the following season won their 'Best & Fairest' award. In 1991 and 1992, his final two years with the club, he was captain.
