= Bill Box =

Australian rules footballer

Personal information
- Full name: Williams S. Box
- Born: 11 June 1938
- Died: 8 July 2006 (aged 68)
- Original team: Whitton
- Height: 183 cm (6 ft 0 in)
- Weight: 98 kg (216 lb)
- Position: Centre

Playing career^{1}
Years	Club	Games (Goals)
1958	Essendon	9 (4)
- ^{1} Playing statistics correct to the end of 1958.

Bill Box (11 June 1938 – 8 July 2006) is a former Australian rules footballer who played with Essendon in the Victorian Football League (VFL). He was later captain-coach of Whitton, Culcairn - 1967, Barham, Henty and The Rock.
