= Collingullie =

- Town
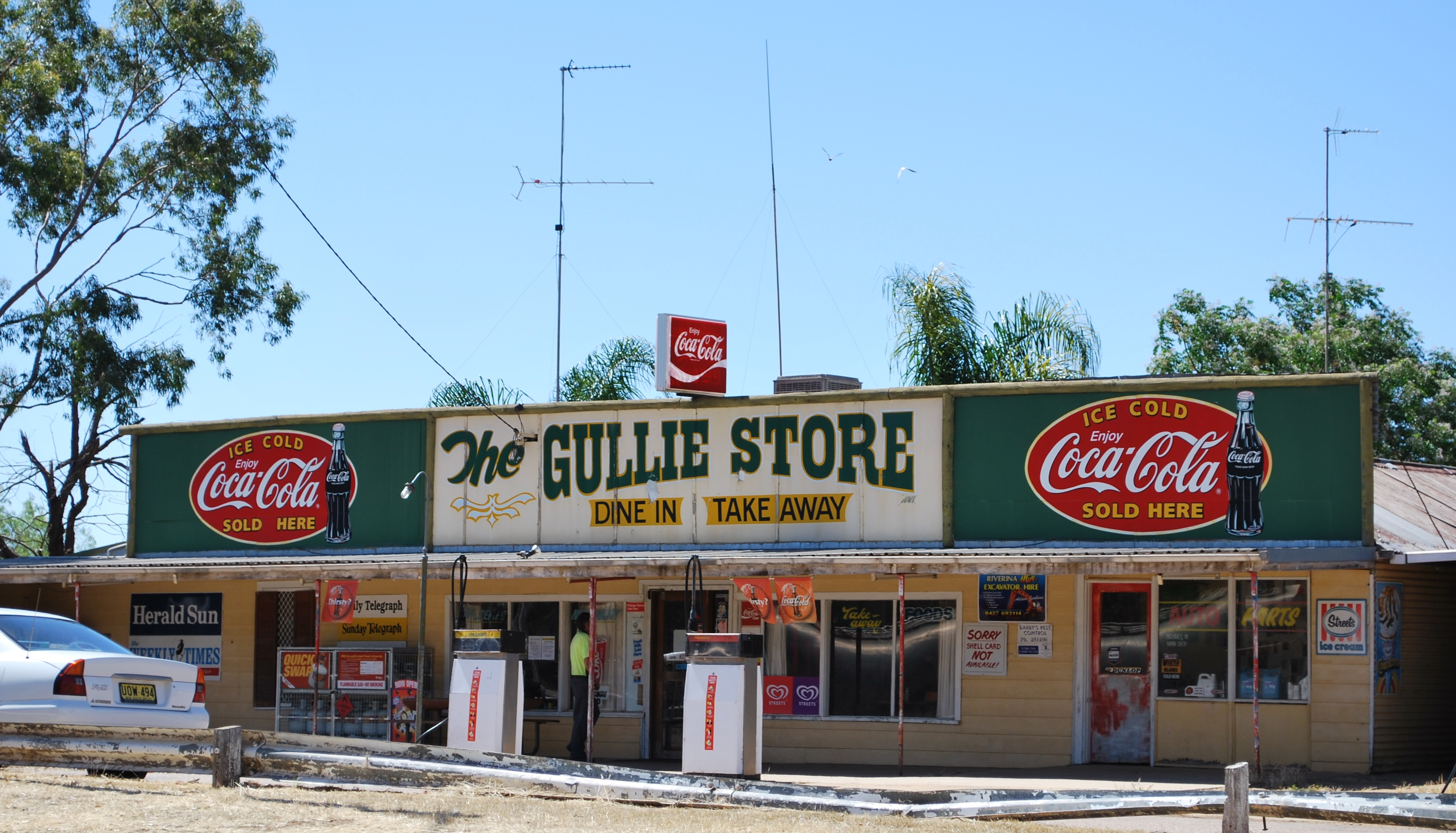
- General Store at Collingullie

- Coordinates: 35°5′19″S 147°7′44″E
- Country: Australia
- State: New South Wales
- LGA: City of Wagga Wagga
- Location: 482 km (300 mi) from Sydney; 27 km (17 mi) from Wagga Wagga; 43 km (27 mi) from Lockhart; 22 km (14 mi) from Galore

Government
  - State electorate: Wagga Wagga
  - Federal division: Riverina
- Elevation: 182 m (597 ft)

Population
  - Total: 258 (2021 census)
- Postcode: 2650
- County: Mitchell

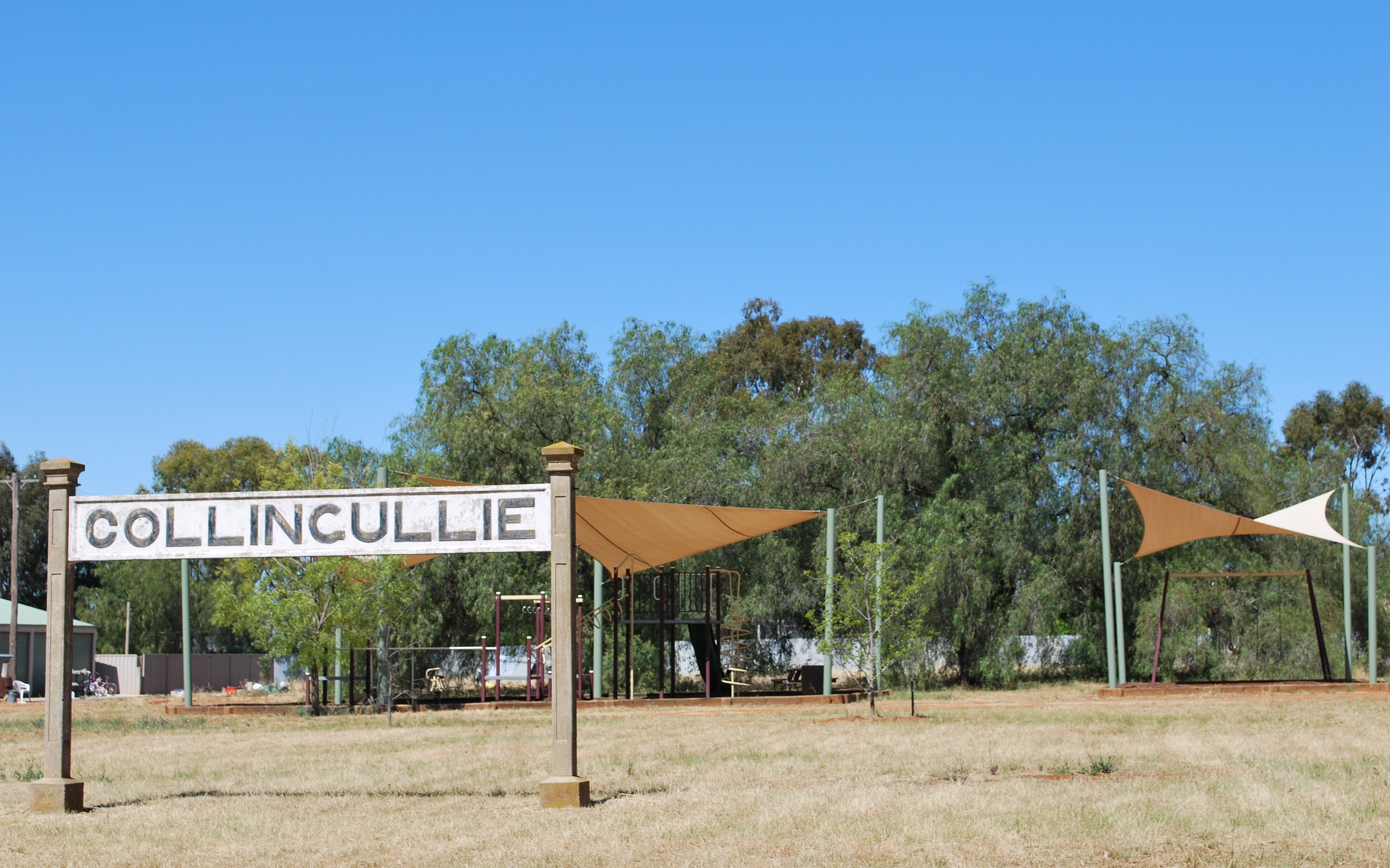
Collingullie Park

Collingullie (/ˈkɒlɪnɡʌli/ KOL-in-gul-ee) is a village 26 kilometres (16 mi) north-west of Wagga Wagga in the Riverina region of New South Wales, Australia. The village is located on the Sturt Highway, between Wagga Wagga and Narrandera, at the crossroads with the road to Lockhart.

At the 2021 census, Collingullie had a population of 258 people. The name, Collingullie, could have derived from an Aboriginal word meaning 'boggy ground'.

Collingullie Post Office opened on 1 August 1879 and closed in 1982. The town's school, Collingullie Public School which has 56 students, is located on Urana Street.

== Popular culture ==
The town was the subject of a song written by Garth Porter and Lee Kernaghan, "Collingullie Station", on the Three Chain Road album.

In recent years the tiny village of Collingullie has produced two Australian Football League draftees – Matthew Kennedy and Harry Perryman, who both played for the Greater Western Sydney Football Club.

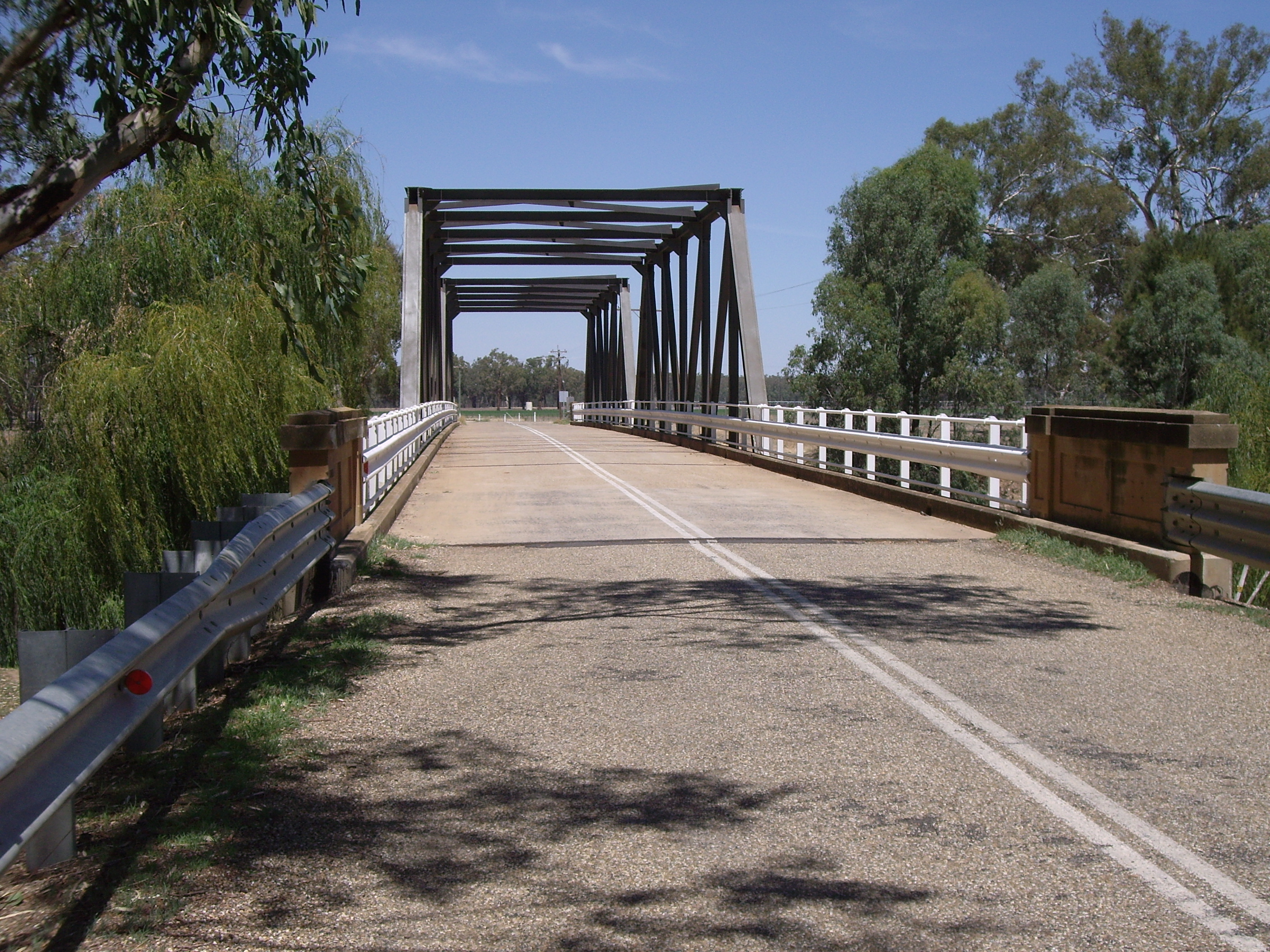
Bridge over Murrumbidgee River on Millwood to Collingullie Road
