= Daniel McPherson =

Australian rules footballer and coach

Personal information
- Born: 5 July 1975 (age 51); Ganmain, New South Wales
- Original team: Ganmain-Grong Grong-Matong (RFL)
- Height: 182 cm (6 ft 0 in)
- Weight: 85 kg (187 lb)

Playing career^{1}
| Years | Club | Games (Goals) |
| 1994–2003 | Sydney | 111 (36) |
- ^{1} Playing statistics correct to the end of 2003.

Career highlights
- AFL Rising Star nominee: 1996

Daniel McPherson (born 5 July 1975) is a former Australian rules footballer who played with the Sydney Swans in the Australian Football League. Originally from Matong, a small town in New South Wales, McPherson played for the Swans between 1994 and 2003. He has served as the forward coach of the Melbourne Football Club since October 2013.

After retiring from playing, he turned to coaching, leading North Shore Australian Football Club in the Sydney AFL in 2005. He then joined the Sydney coaching staff and coached the Sydney reserves in the AFL Canberra league in 2010.
