= Wooden Wicket, Berembed Weir =

Wooden weir in New South Wales, Australia

- Location within New South Wales Location within Australia
- 34.8770°S 146.8371°E
- Location: Murrumbidgee River, Matong, City of Wagga Wagga, New South Wales, Australia

History
- Built: 1910–1910

Site notes
- Owner: Department of Planning and Infrastructure

New South Wales Heritage Register
- Official name: Wooden Wicket - Berembed Weir Site
- Type: state heritage (built)
- Designated: 2 April 1999
- Reference no.: 968
- Type: Weir
- Category: Utilities - Water
- Builders: Fitzroy Dock, Sydney

Wooden Wicket, Berembed Weir is a heritage-listed wooden weir component at Berembed Weir, Murrumbidgee River, Matong, City of Wagga Wagga, New South Wales, Australia. It was made in 1910 at Fitzroy Dock in Sydney. It was added to the New South Wales State Heritage Register on 2 April 1999.

== History ==
The wooden wicket (or shutter) was one of a set of 55 collapsible Chanoine wickets originally incorporated in Berembed Weir. Berembed Weir was part of the scheme launched under Barren Jack and Murrumbidgee Canals Construction Act 1906. The wickets at Berembed Weir were the first weir gate regulators downstream from Burrinjuck Dam, and constituted a manual system of controlling the river flows and water supply to the Murrumbidgee Irrigation Areas.

The whole of the iron and timber work for these wickets was constructed in 1910 at the Fitzroy Dock at Cockatoo Island Dockyard in Sydney. The workmanship and cost received commendations from the then Chief Engineer, L. A. B. Wade. The wickets were manually manipulated from a punt moored upstream of the weir. The wickets continued to be in operation until 1977 when they were replaced by an automated weir system. One of the wickets, after its removal, was incorporated into a memorial in the Berembed Picnic Grounds commemorating the upgrading of the weir in 1977.

== Description ==
The wicket on display at the Berembed Picnic Grounds is the only remaining one of a set of 55 wickets originally operated at Berembed Weir. It is mounted on a concrete plinth. A bronze plaque, commemorating the completion of the upgrading of Berembed Weir was unveiled by Lin Gordon, MLA, Minister for Conservation and for Water Resources on 23 September 1977, and is mounted on the wicket.

The wicket measures 901mm (2' 11.5"")wide, and is made of 6 tallow-wood planks 7602mm (3") thick at the top and 152mm (6") at the bottom. The planks are bolted together and strongly braced, supported at the back by a trestle and a wrought iron spurbrace working in a cast-iron "hurter" or support.

The wicket on display was reported to be showing signs of environmental degradation as at 8 December 2000, with the timber sections at the base suffering from rot.

== Heritage listing ==
The wicket is the only one remaining of a set of 55 Chanoine wickets originally incorporated at the Berembed Weir. It is a good representative of the early river flow control system. The iron and timber work of the wicket is a good example of the excellent workmanship by workers at the then government owned Fitzroy Dock. Now used as a memorial, it commemorates the 1977 upgrading of the weir.

Wooden Wicket, Berembed Weir was listed on the New South Wales State Heritage Register on 2 April 1999.
