= Narrandera Showground Industrial Hall =

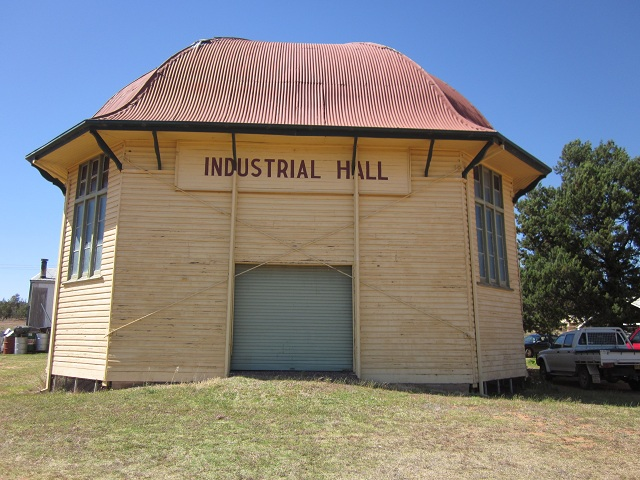

- Location within New South Wales Location within Australia
- 34.7480°S 146.5666°E
- Location: Elizabeth Street, Narrandera, Narrandera Shire, New South Wales, Australia

History
- Built: 1902

Site notes
- Architect: Attributed to Ernest Rees Laver
- Owner: NSW Trade and Investment - Crown Lands Division

New South Wales Heritage Register
- Official name: Narrandera Showground Industrial Hall; The Dome; Narrandera Showground complex
- Type: state heritage (built)
- Designated: 10 August 2015
- Reference no.: 1952
- Type: Exhibition Building
- Category: Community Facilities
- Builders: Englebert Albert Schuller/Charles Bundock

Narrandera Showground Industrial Hall is a heritage-listed showground building at Elizabeth Street, Narrandera, Narrandera Shire, New South Wales, Australia. The design of the building was variously attributed to Ernest Rees Laver or Charles Bundock. It was built in 1902 by Englebert Albert Schuller and Charles Bundock. It is also known as The Dome. It was added to the New South Wales State Heritage Register on 10 August 2015.

== History ==
The early development of Narrandera township on the Murrumbidgee River began in the 1860s with the opening of land to selection. The township's early dependence on the unreliable steamboat trade (that was subject to drought and flood) gave way to a new era of development and prosperity with the extension of the railway line from Junee through Narrandera to Hay in 1882 and in 1884 from Narrandera to Jerilderie. The Borough of Narrandera was proclaimed in 1885. By 1901 its population had doubled to reach 2,255.

Narrandera was one of the most progressive towns in the colony. Its wealth derived from its strong pastoral and agricultural base and its location on a railway junction that gave rise to a diverse range of industries that processed agricultural raw materials: timber, wool scours, soap works, flour-mills and meat chilling.

The first pastoral and agricultural show in Narrandera was held in 1882, (the same year that the Sydney Easter Show moved to the Moore Park Showground). The Sydney Morning Herald of 2 September 1882 described the inaugural Narrandera show as a great success. Following an application to the Minister for Lands, the Narrandera Pastoral and Agricultural Association was granted a site of six ha (15 acres) as a showground. The land was dedicated on 16 March 1883, a further 3.6 ha (nine acres) being added on 14 November 1893, and another four ha (10 acres) on 12 August 1903, making a total of 13.75 ha (34 acres).

The economic depression of the 1890s was followed by drought across eastern Australia. The King Drought of 1895–1903 was the most prolonged since European settlement, its worst year being 1902–03. The Narrandera Argus noted in 1902 that local stock numbers for horses, cattle and sheep had plummeted between 1901 and 1902 and there was concern that the drought would have an adverse impact on the forthcoming 1902 show. The Argus commented: "It must be readily acknowledged that seasons such as the district has passed through must of necessity have a prejudicial effect upon all pastoral and agricultural products. But when it is an accepted fact that of late years those who managed to keep their stock alive are regarded as fortunate, and that few farmers have reaped any produce – even of an inferior quality – it is unreasonable to assume that a show following seven years of drought is properly representative of the fertility of the district". ('Narrandera Argus', January 30, 1902).

Reporting on the 1902 show, the Narrandera Argus claimed that the 20th annual show was "Successful Beyond Anticipation. There was an overall increase in nearly all categories, but most noticeably in the Industrial Arts, where categories included Needle and Fancy Work, Drawing and School Work, Cookery, Painting, Drawing and Photography, and Fruit and Flowers" ('Narrandera Argus', August 1902). The construction of the purpose-built Industrial Hall for the 1902 show arguably assisted in generating the increased number of entries in this category.

Agricultural shows at that time were significant events in the community and special trains were often scheduled to bring visitors from adjacent towns. Narrandera's location on a railway junction and the showground's position within walking distance of the station positioned it well to draw attendance from neighbouring towns as well as the surrounding district. The show was a collective demonstration of a community's ability and played a social, as well as an economic, function. A community that could put on a good show, particularly in the midst of a severe drought, was demonstrating not only its capacity but also its resilience. The purpose of the Industrial Hall was to demonstrate the range of art, craft, domestic skills and school work of the women and children of the district.

Reporting on the 1903 Annual General Meeting of the Narrandera Pastoral and Agricultural Association, the Narrandera Argus noted that the 'improvements on the ground at this time were ring, grandstand, sheep and poultry sheds, fine arts pavilion [presumably the 1902 Industrial Hall], caretaker's cottage, yards and fencing'.

Exhibits were originally displayed on wooden benches. In 1956 the Narrandera builder G. L. (George) Hinchey and his apprenticed son, Ian, built fine, painted timber and glass display cabinets for the Industrial Hall (one, along the eastern wall, is the surviving remnant of the original cabinets). They consisted of a freestanding central cabinet and cabinets lining all the internal walls. They provided a continuous display area with several lift-up glass covers and were used for the display of competition produce such as cakes and jams.

In 1903 it was reported that the "Committee recommend that a new Industrial Hall should be erected (in which class the exhibitions are largely increasing), if the funds of the Association will permit" ('Narrandera Argus', January 30, 1903). Further research of the "Narrandera Argus" up to and including the AGM of January 1904 has revealed no further reference to this second hall. No additional documentary research has been undertaken but it is believed that the second hall was constructed before 1910. Historical photographs show a rectilinear weatherboard and corrugated-iron roofed building abutting the Industrial Hall on the south side. Evidence of this building can also be seen in the Industrial Hall's fabric and in the building's footprint. This second hall was of rougher construction than the 1902 Industrial Hall and was eventually demolished in the 1950s or 1960s.

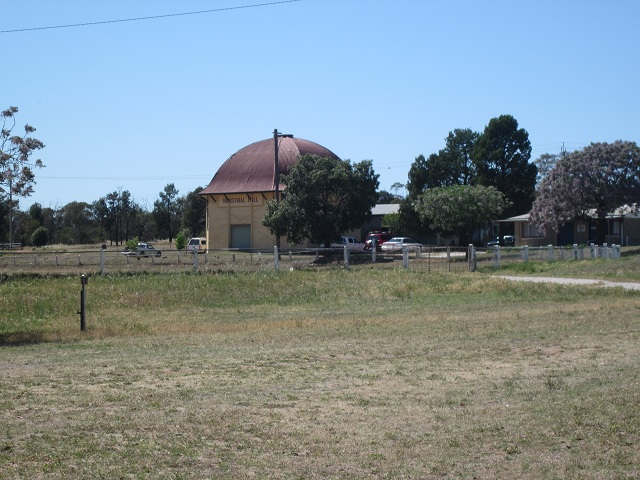
The hall viewed from Elizabeth Street

The designer of the 1902 Narrandera Showground Industrial Hall is disputed. Some oral evidence attributes the building's design to Laver and Schular. Jack Driscoll, the well-regarded local historian advised that the builder of the hall was Charles Bundock. This is also noted on the information board within the Industrial Hall. Builders W. & C. (Charles P.) Bundock were responsible for the construction of many fine buildings in Narrandera including St John's United Church in 1907 (with its copper sheathed spire) and The Star Hotel in 1916.

Ernest Rees Laver was an architect with the Victorian Public Works Department in the 1880s who moved to NSW establishing his practice in Narrandera from 1893 to 1902. Laver was responsible for the design of the Grandstand of Narrandera Showground, built in the same year as the Industrial Hall (but destroyed by fire in 1907) as well as the Nowra Showground Pavilion (1905) and a range of domestic, commercial, religious and public buildings in Narrandera and the surrounding region.

The Industrial Hall is the only building of state significance on the Narrandera Showground site. The 1907 Grandstand (that replaced the 1902 Grandstand) was a cypress pine-framed building with Oregon cladding. It was demolished in the 1970s due to white ant infestation and dry rot. Other buildings on the showground site are of later construction (c. late 1950s–70s).

== Description ==
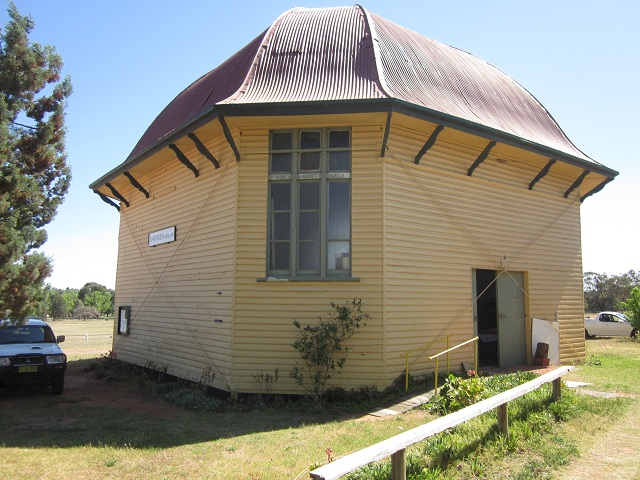
Rear view

The Industrial Hall on Narrandera Showground is an example of the Federation Free Classical style of architecture (a style which dates from c. 1890 to c. 1915) which is characterised by symmetry, classical proportions and absence of detail with a playful quality.

The Narrandera Showground Industrial Hall is a small, single-storey, octagonal, weatherboard building with a bell-curved, domed corrugated iron roof. The building measures 11 m (36 ft) to the top of the dome that was formerly surmounted by a metal, louvred ventilator that was topped with a mini dome and a flagpole (the ventilator, dome and flagpole are now missing). The eaves are supported with curved timber brackets which are set above an external timber cornice.

The building's octagon is not equal sided, but is more in the nature of a square with splayed corners.

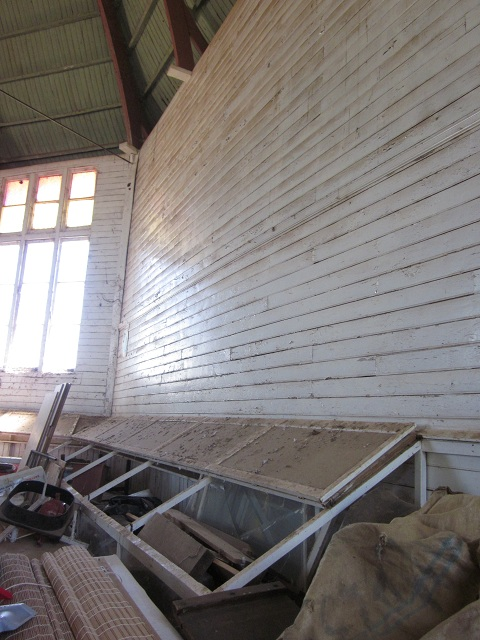
Interior view, showing display cases around the walls

The fifteen-pane windows are mounted in the four shorter sides of the octagon, with sill heights 2.4 m (7 ft 10 in) from ground level to provide a larger area of uninterrupted internal wall space for display. The windows have lintels 4.7 m (15 ft) high and multi-coloured glass in the upper window panes.

There are two doors, in the east and west longer walls. The eastern door, which appears to be original, is solid timber and comprises two units that slide open on an overhead track. The western door is a newer roller door.

The internal walls are of vertical weatherboards to approximately one metre and then horizontal boards to the wall plate, which is about 4.8 metres (16 ft) above the floor. A series of primary and secondary curved laminated timber ribs support the roof and ceiling, which again is composed of horizontal purlins and vertical tongue and grooved boards. The primary ribs meet at a decayed octagonal timber ring beam, which supported the former vent. There is a spoke of steel cross-ties at top plate level.

A painted timber and glass display cabinet fitted to the eastern wall of the building is the surviving remnant of the cabinets constructed in 1956 that originally lined the walls with a freestanding central cabinet. The missing cabinets were probably removed after 1996 due to white ant infestation.

The wooden planks on steel supports along the western wall of the Industrial Hall are not specific to this building but move between it and the Pioneer Hall on the showground.

Internally, the high walls, large high-set windows and the exposed ceiling structure of the domed roof create a remarkable, spacious and well-lit interior.

An information board within the building states: "Building constructed about 1902 – cost 367 pounds – built by Charles Bundock – the only building of this design still in service in Australia. Note there was another building of this design built in Innisfail Queensland which was burnt down some forty years ago. Building is listed by the Heritage Council".

The building was painted in 1993. Previously the roof was unpainted corrugated galvanised iron and the lead ridges were more pronounced.

Prior to the 1970s the building was undermined by rabbits and started to sink. During the 1970s, extensive renovations were carried out. The building was restumped and rests on cement bricks in the centre and pipes embedded in concrete around the sides. It now stands about 20 cm (7.9 in) above ground level, with wire mesh around the bottom. Guttering and down pipes have been renewed. Cross-braced ties have been placed externally on the four main sides.

=== Condition ===
As at 23 May 2006, the building is in fair condition only. From a distance it appears straight and true however, closer inspection reveals potential structural problems. Internally, the roof ribs have started to delaminate and their upper ends, where loads are meant to distribute to the upper ring beam, have been completely eaten away by termites and much of the ring beam is missing. As a consequence the purlins must now be carrying the structural loads. A layer of mesh and plastic has been laid over the internal steel cross-ties to catch falling parts of the decaying structure. Some of the internal lining boards have come loose and need attention, and generally the building needs painting.

There have been minor alterations to the structure, including the addition of the roller door, slight changes to fenestration, introduction of steel bracing rods and the loss of the metal ventilator, mini dome and flagpole. However, the building is largely intact and continues to clearly express a strong sense of architectural design.

=== Modifications and dates ===
A rectilinear weatherboard and corrugated-iron roofed building abutted the Narrandera Showground Industrial Hall on the south side, evidence of which can be seen in diagonal cuts in the eaves bracket cornice and in photographs. The level footprint of this building can still be discerned in the ground. This building was demolished, probably in the 1950s or 1960s.

The building was restumped in the 1970s. As a result, the building's stability was threatened and the internal timber bracing started to pull away. A few years after the restumping (and prior to 1978) the steel rod cross bracing was installed by members of the Show Society. It was probable that internal steel cross-ties were added at this time, although this has not been fully explored. The cement brick piers were retro-fitted when the cross bracing was added.

The former roof ventilator, mini dome and flagpole were removed, probably in the late 1980s. The mini dome and ventilator were affected with dry rot and disintegrated on removal. The flagpole is believed to have survived but its current location is uncertain. A historical photograph shows these removed structures in place, together with a rectilinear weatherboard and corrugated-iron roofed building that abutted the Industrial Hall and which was demolished in the 1950s or 1960s.

The building exterior was painted in 1993.

== Heritage listing ==
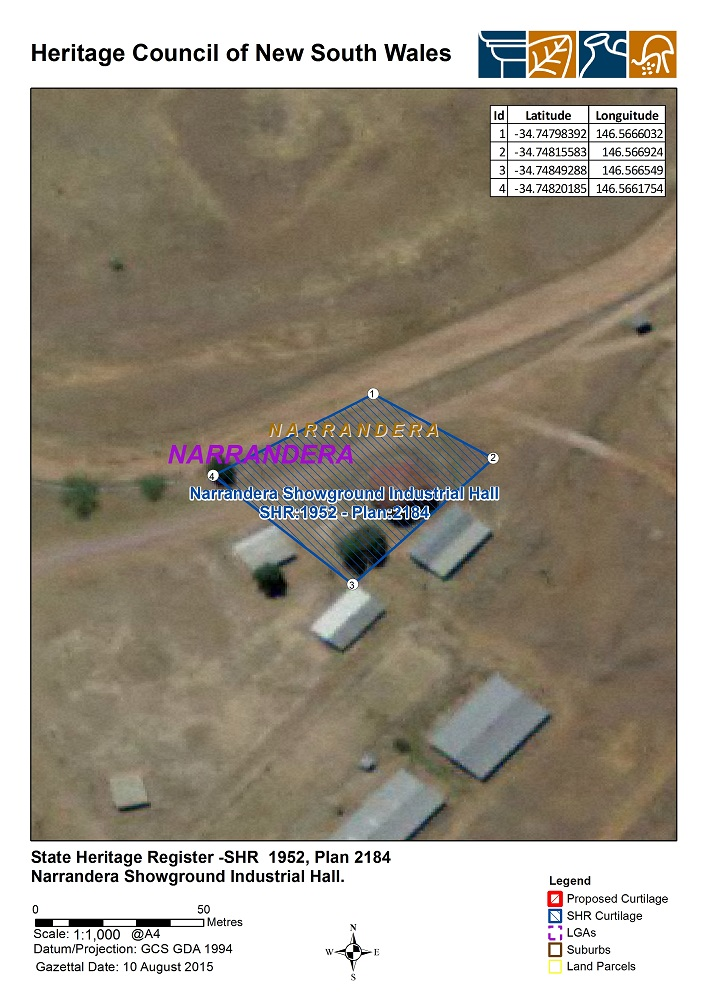
Heritage boundaries

The Narrandera Showground Industrial Hall is of state heritage significance as a rare example of a distinctive design of showground building. It is the only surviving building of its design and type known to exist on a showground in New South Wales. The Narrandera Showground Industrial Hall's distinctive and imposing character derives from its over-sized scale created by an octagonal form with a bell-shaped, domed roof and large, high set windows. Internally, this building form (with its exposed ceiling structure) has created a remarkable, spacious and well-lit interior that served its exhibition function with excellence. A surviving 1956 painted timber and glass display cabinet remains fitted to the eastern wall of the building.

The building design is representative of the Federation Free Classical style of architecture that was characterised by formal classicism with a playful quality and exemplified the stability and prosperity of its occupants. A style that was mainly confined to large urban properties, its use in a small, timber rural structure is uncommon.

The Narrandera Showground Industrial Hall is of state heritage significance as surviving evidence of the resilience and capacity of a rural and regional community during a period of prolonged adversity. Constructed in 1902, the hall was built during the worst year of the Federation Drought (1895–1903), the most protracted and severe drought to affect the eastern region of Australia since European settlement. At a time when Australia's rural prospects were spiralling into a deep slump and rural communities were financially and emotionally devastated, the residents of Narrandera sought to celebrate their district, its people and the future prosperity of the region through the construction of the Narrandera Showground Industrial Hall.

Narrandera Showground Industrial Hall was listed on the New South Wales State Heritage Register on 10 August 2015 having satisfied the following criteria.

The place is important in demonstrating the course, or pattern, of cultural or natural history in New South Wales.

The Narrandera Showground Industrial Hall is of state heritage significance as surviving evidence of the resilience and capacity of a rural and regional community during a period of prolonged adversity. Constructed in 1902, the hall was built during the worst year of the Federation Drought (1895–1903), the most protracted and severe drought to affect the eastern region of Australia since European settlement. An economic and social catastrophe for Australia, the Federation Drought resulted in the decimation of rural communities, crops, livestock and the wider environment and landscape across the country.

At a time when Australia's rural prospects were spiralling into a deep slump, many farmers and rural communities simply walked away from their debts and the devastation of their drought-caused losses. The people of Narrandera, however, sought to celebrate their district, its people and the anticipated future prosperity of the region through the construction of the Narrandera Showground Industrial Hall. Constructed during the worst year of the drought and at a time when rural communities were financially and emotionally devastated, the unique and ambitious structure served to demonstrate the town's prosperity and aspirations and the community's positive outlook in the face of protracted drought.

The place has a strong or special association with a person, or group of persons, of importance of cultural or natural history of New South Wales's history.

The Narrandera Showground Industrial Hall has associations with founding members of the local community, in particular the Narrandera Pastoral and Agricultural Association.

The building also has local significance for its association with the regional architect Ernest Rees Laver. Its design has been attributed to Laver who was a member of the Royal Victorian Institute of Architects and who worked for the Victorian Public Works Department in the 1880s before settling in Narrandera in 1893.

Laver was also responsible for the showground's grandstand (destroyed in 1907) and a number of other civic buildings in the Narrandera area. Laver later moved his practice to Cootamundra in 1902.

The place is important in demonstrating aesthetic characteristics and/or a high degree of creative or technical achievement in New South Wales.

The Narrandera Showground Industrial Hall is of state heritage significance for its aesthetic values. It is a rare example of a distinctive architectural structure among NSW showground buildings of the Victorian and Federation eras.

The distinctive and imposing character of the hall derives from its unusual octagonal form and bell-shaped roof. The over-sized scale of this small building is both intriguing and exemplary for its purpose. It is an example of the Federation Free Classical style of architecture whose principal characteristics are formal classicism with a playful quality as expressed by symmetry, elegantly proportioned shapes and simple detail with elements of variety and surprise. Federation Free Classical was generally an urban style that exemplified the wealth and stability of a civic area and, after a period of severe drought at the turn of the century, the rural community of Narrandera were intent on demonstrating these attributes.

This hall resembles the domes of vast Beaux-Arts buildings, a style that followed French fashions.

Internally, the large curved and laminated ribs of the striking ceiling composition demonstrate technical competence at the time. The combination of octagonal form, high walls, high and diffused glazing and the exposed ceiling structure create a remarkable and well-lit internal space that was an excellent vehicle for the exhibition of arts and crafts.

The design of the building has been attributed to the regional architect Ernest Rees Laver. None of Laver's known surviving buildings reflects the appearance of the Narrandera Showground Industrial Hall, although some similarities with his use of the Federation Free Classical style are evident.

The place has strong or special association with a particular community or cultural group in New South Wales for social, cultural or spiritual reasons.

The Narrandera Showground Industrial Hall has social significance at the local level as it has served the Narrandera community as a display pavilion for more than a century. The major structural work of 1978 and the exterior painting in 1993 demonstrate that the building is valued by its community.

The place has potential to yield information that will contribute to an understanding of the cultural or natural history of New South Wales.

The building is significant at a local level for its capacity to provide distinctive and rare material evidence of the role and contribution of a rural community (and in particular its women and children) to that community's social and economic prosperity following a period of unprecedented adversity.

The site may have archaeological potential of local significance if further investigation of the formally adjoining building is undertaken.

The place possesses uncommon, rare or endangered aspects of the cultural or natural history of New South Wales.

The Narrandera Showground Industrial Hall is of state heritage significance for its rare, distinctive and intriguing architecture amongst other showground buildings in the state. It is the only building of its design and type known to exist in New South Wales.

Several industrial hall buildings were erected on showgrounds in the same period as Narrandera. However it is considered that the hall at Narrandera may be the only surviving building of its architectural nature in the state. An uncommon example of the Federation Free Classical style of architecture, applied to a utilitarian building in a rural setting, the hall is a small building constructed of in a radically different design and scale. Its design has been attributed to the regional architect Ernest Rees Laver. None of Laver's known surviving buildings is similar in appearance to the Industrial Hall.

A similar structure was thought to exist on the showground at Innisfail, Queensland, but it was destroyed by fire many years ago.

The place is important in demonstrating the principal characteristics of a class of cultural or natural places/environments in New South Wales.

The Narrandera Showground Industrial Hall is of state heritage significance for its capacity to demonstrate a significant architectural variation to the usual range of showground buildings in NSW.

Showgrounds often have idiosyncratic and distinctive structures (such as grandstands, pavilions, entry gates and kiosks) which reflect local design skills, available building materials, or a particular historical context. The Narrandera Showground Industrial Hall is representative of this tradition.
