= Narrandera Argus =

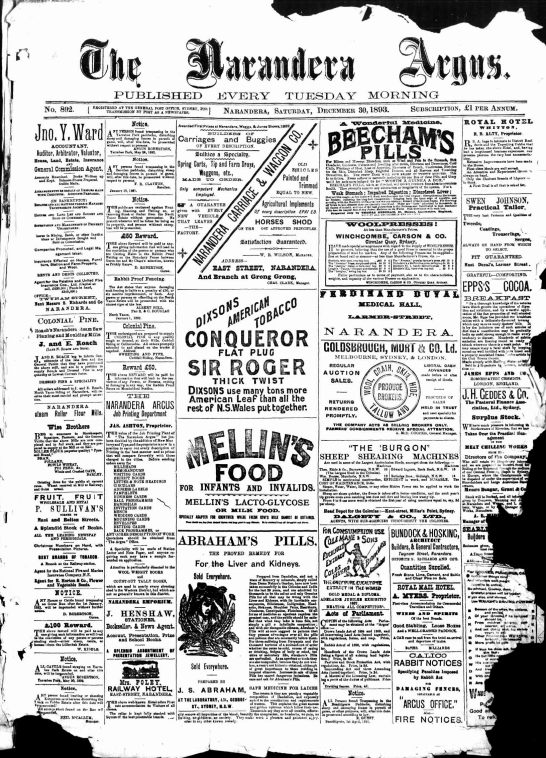
Front page of Narandera Argus and Riverina Advertiser, 30 December 1893

The Narrandera Argus, previously published as The Narandera Argus and Riverina Advertiser, is a weekly, English language, compact format newspaper published in Narrandera, New South Wales.

== History ==
First published in 1880, The Narandera Argus and Riverina Advertiser was published until 1953 when it changed its title to the Narrandera Argus, which is still in publication. It was published by James Ashton from 1892 and later by Donald M'Neil Turner. A rival newspaper, the Narrandera Ensign, was established in 1886. This paper promoted protectionism, while the Argus promoted free trade.

The paper currently has a circulation of 2,000 across Narrandera, Leeton, Yanco, Griffith, Coolamon, Ganmain, Matong and Grong Grong.

== Digitisation ==
Editions of the paper published between 1893 and 1953 have been digitised as part of the Australian Newspapers Digitisation Program project of the National Library of Australia.

== See also ==
- List of newspapers in Australia
- List of newspapers in New South Wales
