= Narrandera Sportsground =

Sports venue in Narrandera, New South Wales

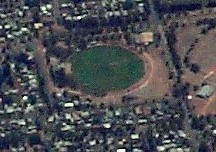
- Narrandera Sportsground in 2007
- Interactive map of Narrandera Sportsground
- Address: 2–32 Victoria Ave; Narrandera, New South Wales
- Coordinates: 34.74680°S 146.56310°E
- Owner: Narrandera Shire Council
- Capacity: 14,000 (300 seated)
- Record attendance: 14,000 (Wagga Kangaroos vs Tumbarumba, late 1962)

Construction
- Opened: 1880s; 145 years ago
- Architect: Bill Talbot

Tenants
- Narrandera Imperials Football Club (1913–); Narrandera Lizards (1921–)

Narrandera Sportsground (sometimes stylised as Narrandera Sports Ground) is an Australian rules football, rugby league and cricket venue located in the New South Wales town of Narrandera. It is the home of the Narrandera Imperials Football Club in the Riverina Football Netball League (RFNL) and the Narrandera Lizards in the Group 20 Rugby League competition.

It has long been regarded as one of the top sporting venues in the Riverina region, with the Narrandera Shire Council saying it is "often referred to as the best ground after the MCG". The Narrandera Argus wrote in 1952 that "no other ground" could accommodate a large crowd as "comfortably" as it could, while in 2017, readers of The Daily Advertiser voted the venue as the region's "best sports ground for big matches".

== History ==
Narrandera Sportsground was designed by Bill Talbot, a local engineer and planner. The first recorded Australian rules football match at the venue took place in 1882. In 1913, the Narrandera Imperials Football Club – which had been formed three years prior – moved to the venue, winning the South West District Football League (SWDFL) premiership the same year.

The grandstand at Narrandera Sportsground was named after Lance Paterson, who played for the Narrandera Imperials in the 1930s and served the club in several off-field roles over a period of 70 years.

In 1962, Narrandera Sportsground's record attendance was set when 14,000 people watched the Group 20 Rugby League grand final between the Wagga Kangaroos and Tumbarumba. Two years later, a crowd of 10,000 people attended the 1963–64 VCFL Country Championship final between the SWDFL and the Hampden Football League.

For the 1986 Country Day, the Sydney Swans played North Melbourne in a Victorian Football League (now AFL) pre-season match at Narrandera Sportsground. Although the start of the match was delayed by 90 minutes because of a flight schedule change in Sydney, the Swans won the match by 83 points in front of a crowd of 9,000 people.

Since 2000, four Australian Football League (AFL) pre-season matches have been played at Narrandera Sportsground. The highest crowd for these matches was during in 2007, when 10,979 people watched Sydney defeat Collingwood.

On 4 July 2026, Narrandera Sportsground hosted its first Victorian Football League (VFL) match, when Greater Western Sydney played Coburg.

== Records ==
=== Attendance ===
#	Crowd	Game	Date	Ref
1	14,000	Wagga Kangaroos vs Tumbarumba (1962 Group 20 Rugby League grand final)	Late 1962	
2	10,979	Sydney vs Collingwood (2007 NAB Challenge)	9 March 2007	
3	10,000	South West District vs Hampden (1963–64 VCFL Country Championship final)	11 July 1964	
