= Grong Grong =

- Town
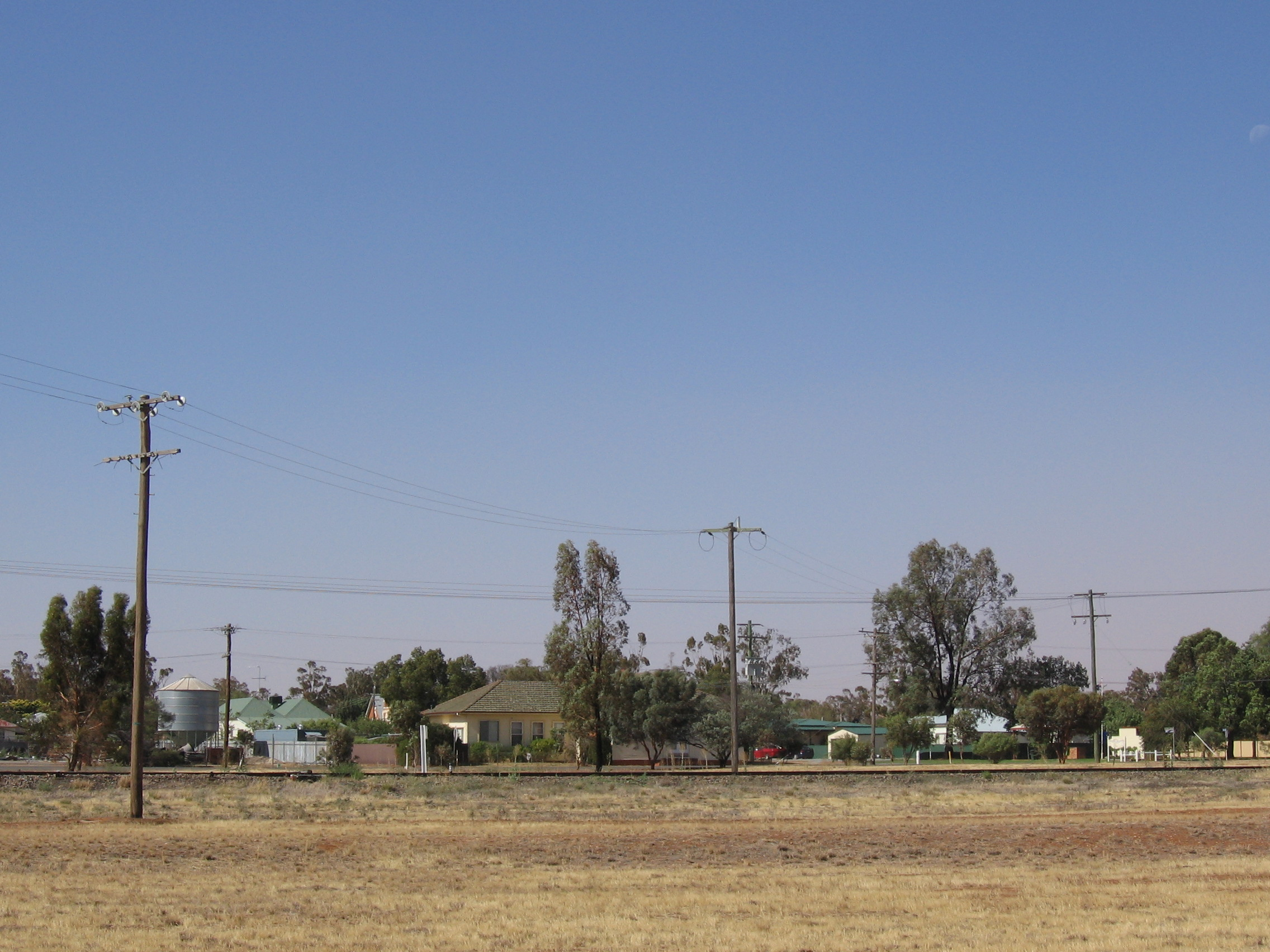
- The town of Grong Grong

- Coordinates: 34°43′0″S 146°47′0″E
- Country: Australia
- State: New South Wales
- LGA: Narrandera Shire
- Location: 510 km (320 mi) SW of Sydney; 457 km (284 mi) N of Melbourne; 82 km (51 mi) NW of Wagga Wagga; 22 km (14 mi) E of Narrandera

Government
  - State electorate: Cootamundra
  - Federal division: Farrer
- Elevation: 162 m (531 ft)

Population
  - Total: 287 (2021 census)
- Postcode: 2652
- County: Bourke

Grong Grong /ˈɡrɒŋ ˈɡrɒŋ/ is a small town that is located in the Riverina region of New South Wales, Australia. The town is situated on the Newell Highway, 23 kilometres (14 mi) east of Narrandera in the Shire of Narrandera.

The name Grong Grong is an Aboriginal term meaning "bad camping ground" or "very bad camping ground".

== Bypass ==
Grong Grong was bypassed in February 2018, to straighten the Newell Highway or A39 by about 2 kilometres and also to eliminate a notorious 25 km/h bend that had caused many accidents, especially trucks overturning.

== Demography ==
Like many rural localities in the area, the population has progressively declined over a number of years, evidenced as follows:

Selected historical census data for Grong Grong state suburb
Census year		2001	2006	2011	2016
Population	Estimated residents on Census night	unavailable	537	391	250

== Facilities ==
The Grong Grong post office was opened on 1 November 1881.

The town has a railway station on the Hay branch off the Main Southern Line. However, the line has closed so with it has the station. Only part of the line is used by a weekly passenger train to Griffith which does not stop at the station. Grong Grong can be accessed by coaches that stop at the town on the way to Hay and Mildura.

Berembed Weir is located 20 km south of the town. The weir diverts water from the Murrumbidgee River into the main canal which flows onto the Murrimbidgee Irrigation Area to serve irrigation farmers in the Leeton and Griffith area. The weir and nearby reserve is popular among local anglers, as well as the various riverside locations situated just 5 km to Grong Grong's south.

== Sport ==
The most popular sport in Grong Grong is Australian rules football, as it lies on the Canola Way, a geographical pocket stretching to nearby Marrar, despite New South Wales being a largely rugby league supporting state. The local team, Ganmain-Grong Grong-Matong, play in the Riverina Football League.

Regular sporting events include golf, tennis and softball, all hosted at the Grong Grong Sports Club.

Grong Grong also hosts annual sporting events such as the Grong Grong Rodeo, Team Penning and Gymkhana.

== Heritage listings ==
Grong Grong has a number of heritage-listed sites, including:

- Murrumbidgee River: Wooden Wicket, Berembed Weir

== Gallery ==
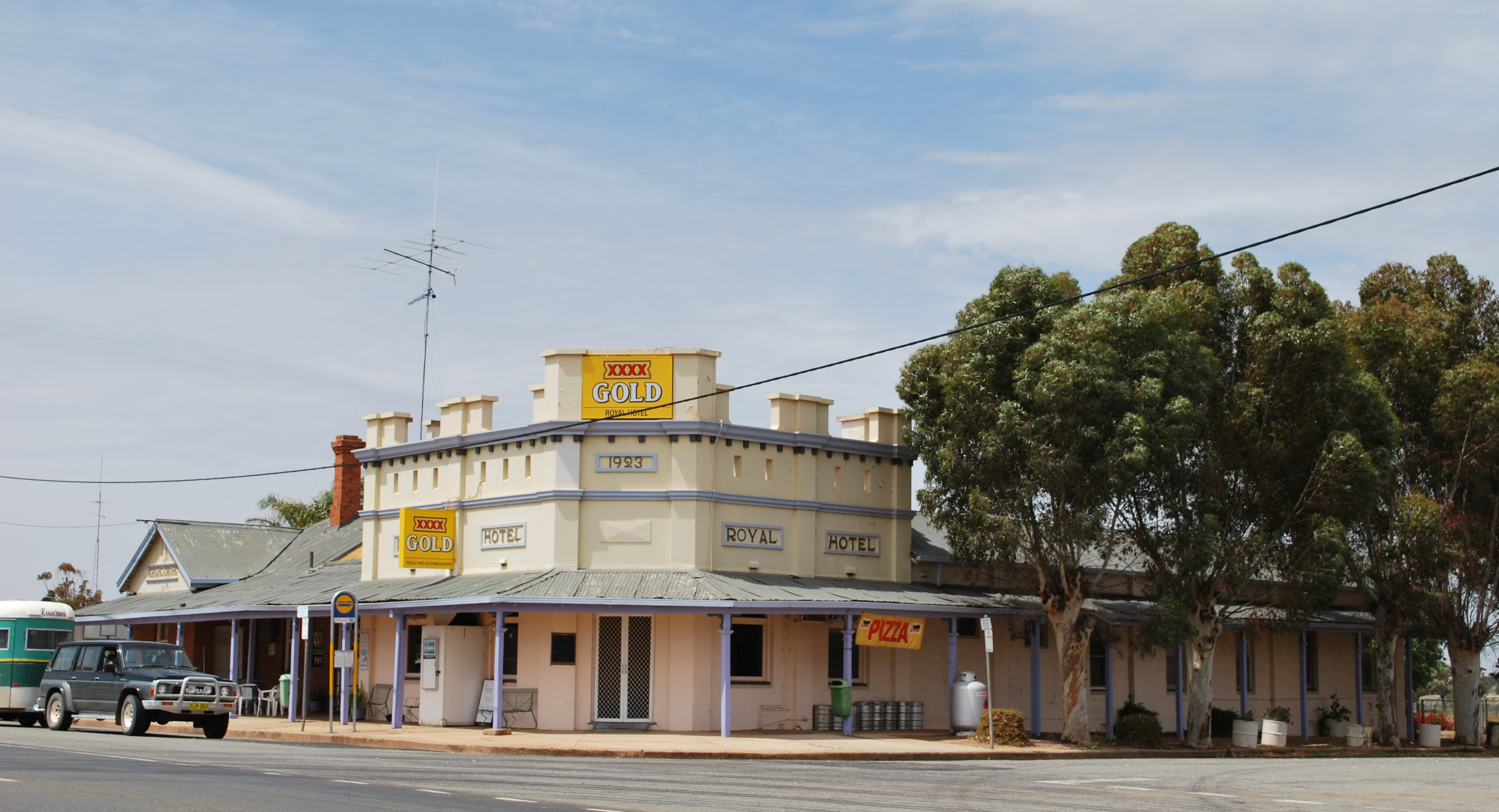
The Royal Hotel at Grong Grong

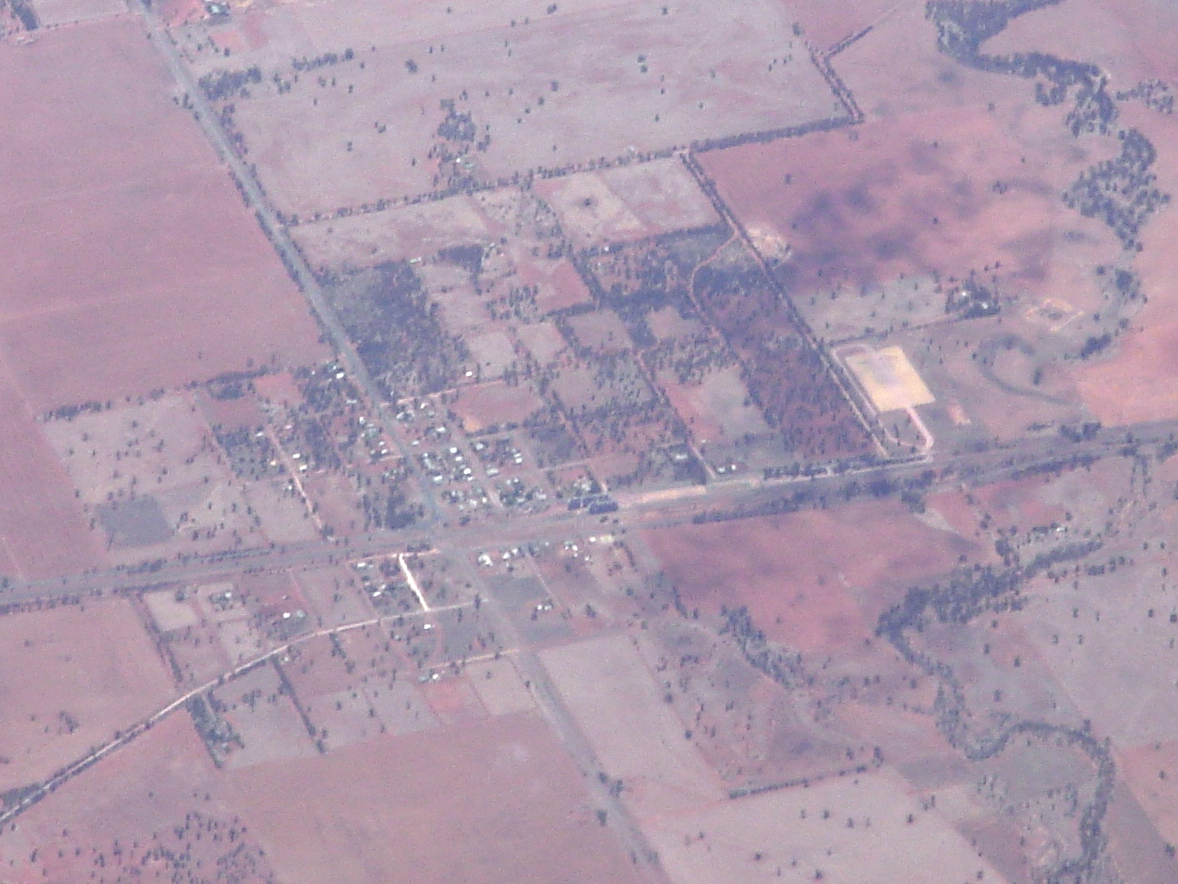
An aerial view of Grong Grong, in 2007

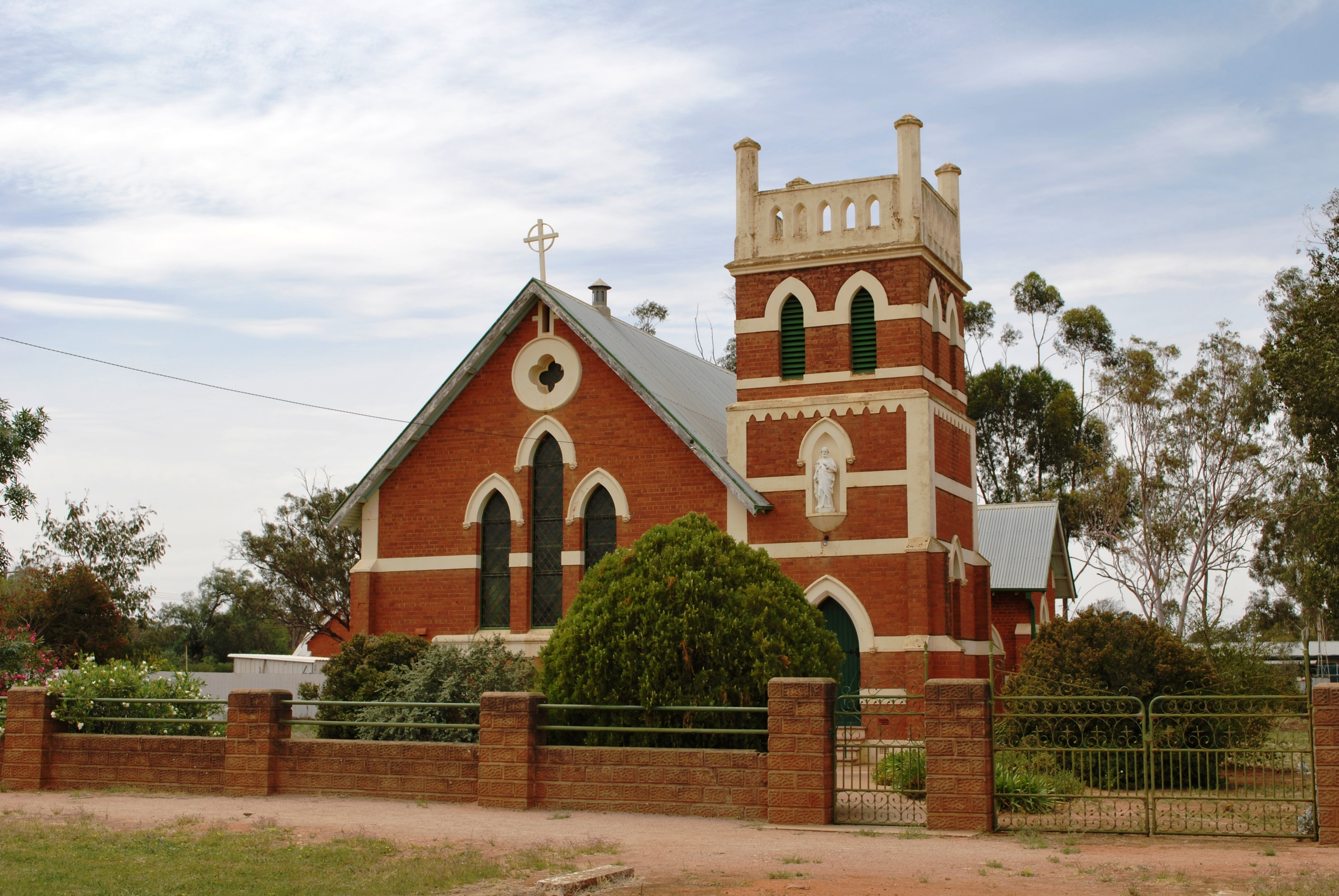
St Patrick's Roman Catholic Church

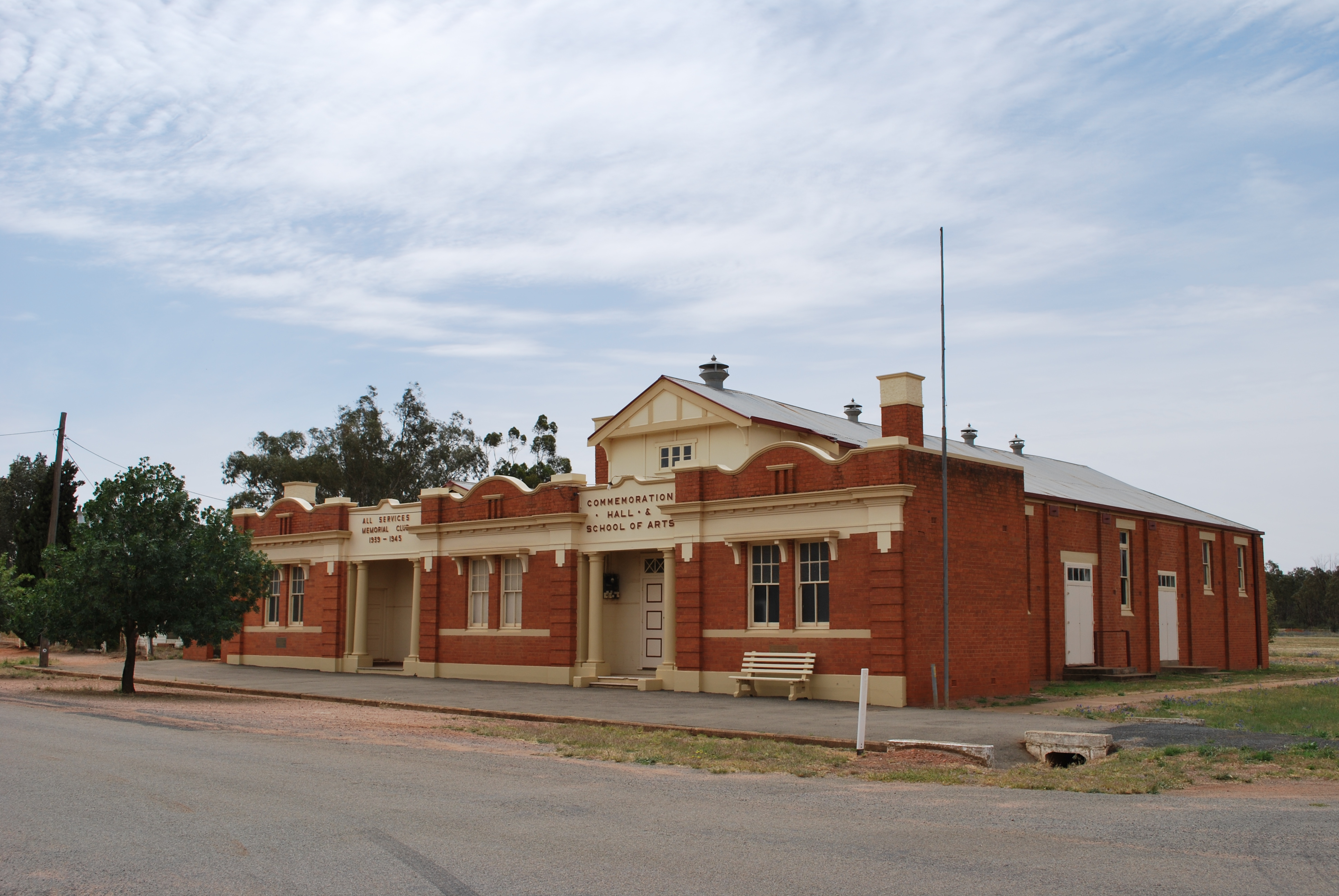
School of Arts hall

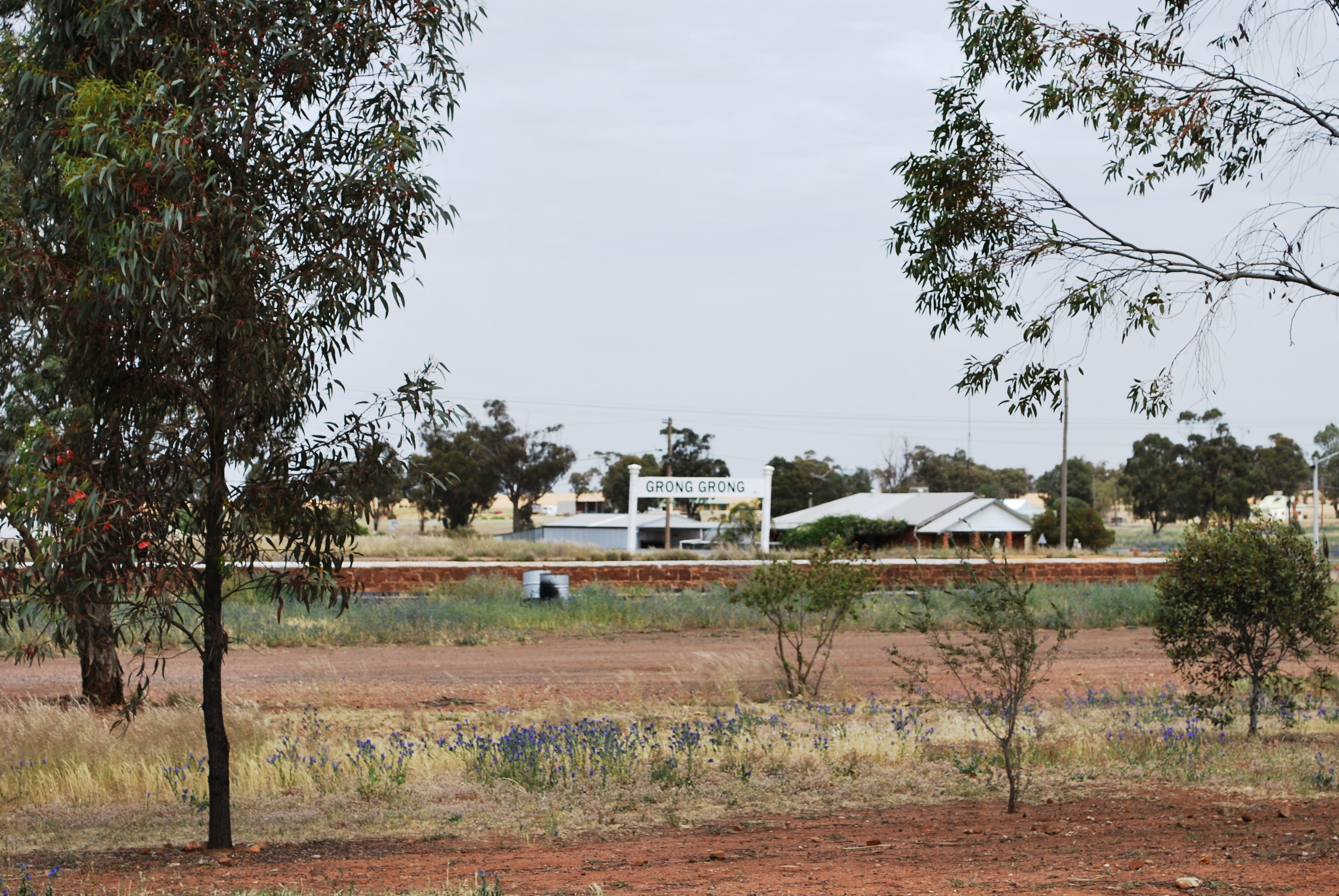
Grong Grong railway siding

== See also ==
- List of reduplicated Australian place names

Preceding station	Former services	Following station
Narrandera towards Hay	Hay Line	Matong towards Junee
