= Derrendi, Narrandera =

Derrendi Cottage
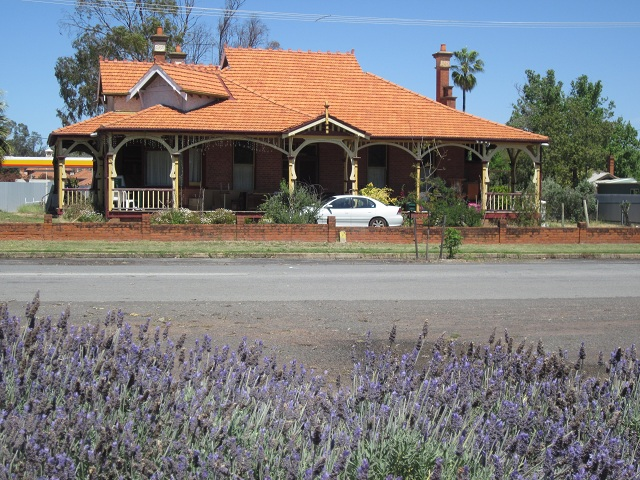

- Location within New South Wales Location within Australia
- 34.7470°S 146.5501°E
- Location: 30–32 Twynam Street, Narrandera, Narrandera Shire, New South Wales, Australia

New South Wales Heritage Register
- Official name: Derrendi Cottage
- Type: state heritage (built)
- Designated: 2 April 1999
- Reference no.: 441
- Type: historic site

Derrendi is a heritage-listed residence at 30–32 Twynam Street, Narrandera, in the Riverina region of New South Wales, Australia. It was added to the New South Wales State Heritage Register on 2 April 1999.

== History ==
Derrendi was designed by Ernest R. Laver and built in 1906.

It is associated with the locally significant Roach family.

== Description ==
It is a red brick residence built in the Queen Anne/Federation style. The essential features of the building remain intact.

== Heritage listing ==
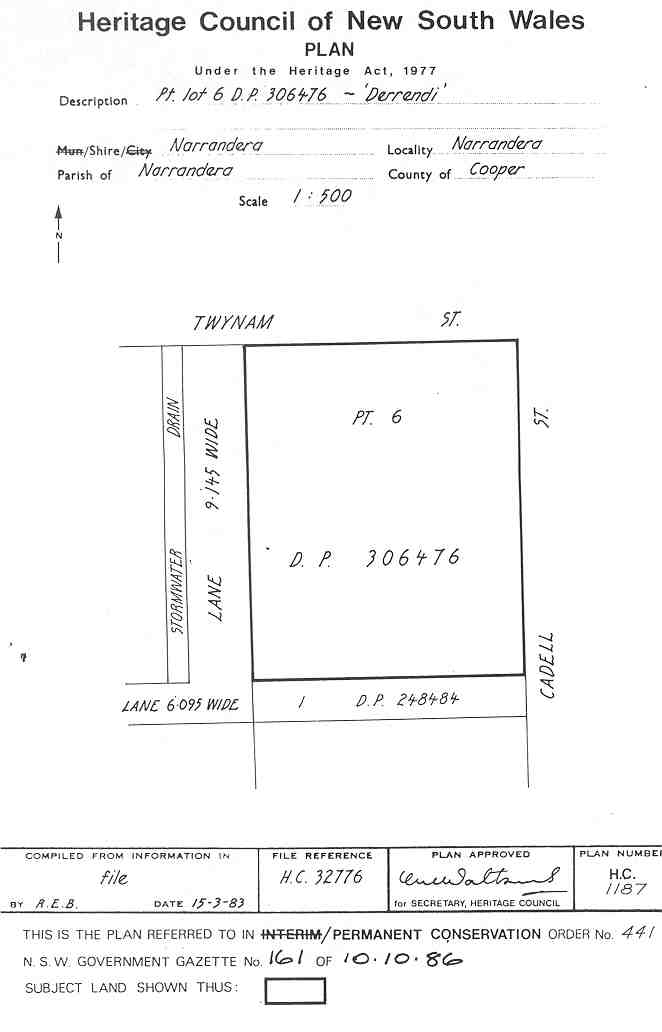
Heritage boundaries

Derrendi was listed on the New South Wales State Heritage Register on 2 April 1999. It is also recognised on the Australian Institute of Architects' register of significant architecture in New South Wales.
