= No. 92 Squadron RAAF =

Royal Australian Air Force squadron

- Active: 1945
- Country: Australia
- Branch: Royal Australian Air Force
- Role: Attack
- Engagements: World War II

Insignia
- Squadron code: OB

Aircraft flown
- Attack: Bristol Beaufort; Bristol Beaufighter
- Trainer: Avro Anson

No. 92 Squadron was a Royal Australian Air Force (RAAF) ground attack squadron of World War II. It was raised in May 1945 to operate Bristol Beaufighter aircraft, but had not completed its training by the end of the war in August and was disbanded the following month.

== History ==
No. 92 Squadron was formed at Kingaroy, Queensland, on 25 May 1945. Its first aircraft, an Avro Anson trainer, was delivered on 19 June followed by a Bristol Beaufort light bomber the next day. The squadron's intended aircraft, Bristol Beaufighter ground attack aircraft, began to arrive on 4 July.

The squadron undertook little flying during the first months of its existence, but began flying training sorties using the Beaufighters from July 1945. The end of the war on 15 August was marked by a two-day stand down and several celebratory events.

The squadron began demobilising shortly after the end of the war. Some flying continued, however, and one of No. 92 Squadron's Beaufighters struck high tension wires and crashed at Narrandera in southern New South Wales on 3 September. This accident resulted in the death of the pilot and six airmen from a RAAF repair and maintenance unit located in the town who were being taken on a joy flight. The Beaufighter had flown from Kingaroy to Narrandera several days earlier to transport another RAAF airman to his mother's funeral. The squadron completed disbanding on 17 September 1945.
