= Berembed Weir =

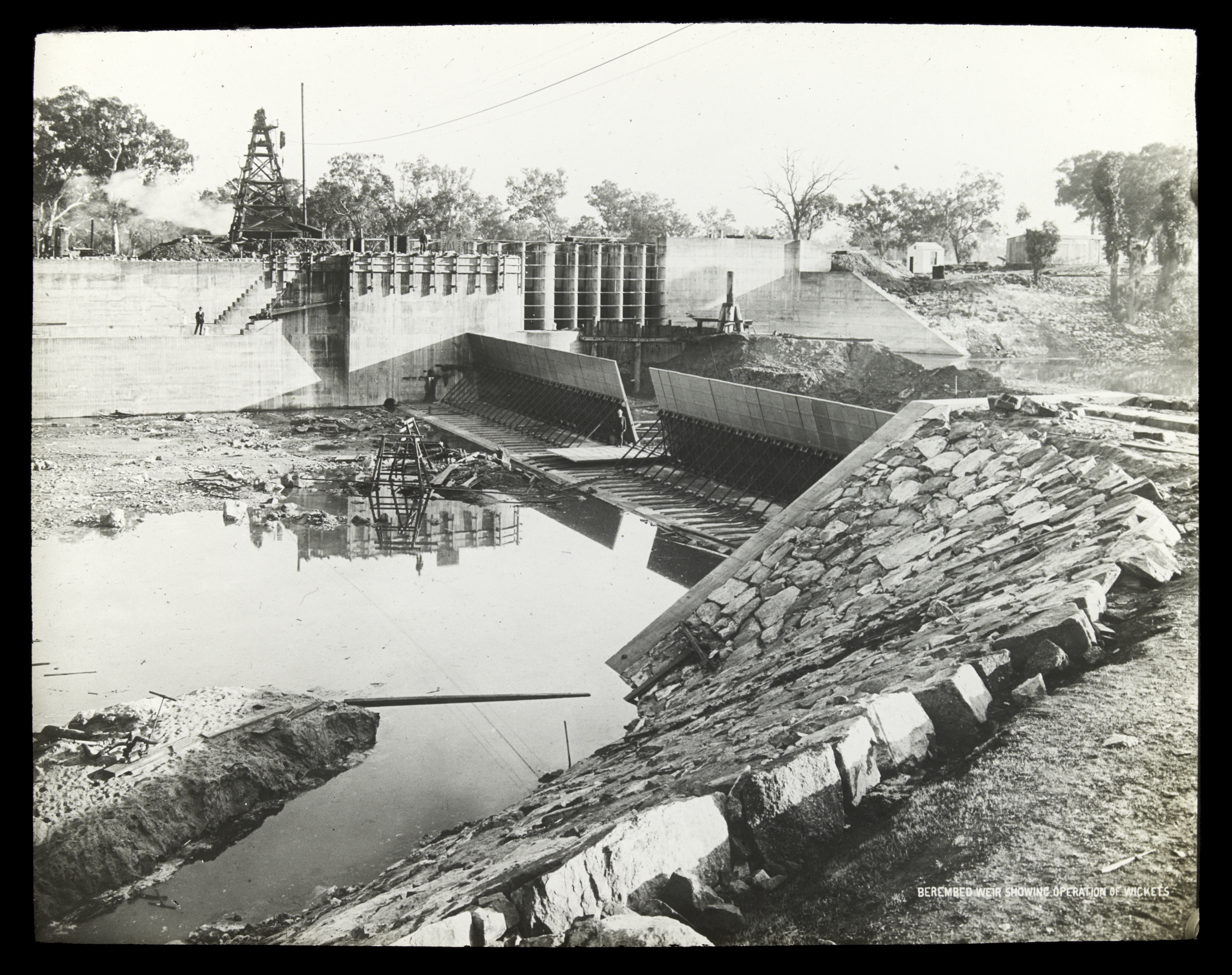
- Berembed Weir is a heritage-listed reservoir in New South Wales, Australia

- Location within New South Wales Location within Australia
- 34.878939°S 146.836386°E
- Location: Murrumbidgee River, Matong, City of Wagga Wagga, New South Wales, Australia

History
- Built: 1909–1910

Site notes
- Architect: E.M de Burgh
- Owner: Department of Planning and Infrastructure

New South Wales Heritage Register
- Official name: Berembed Weir and Site; Berembed Diversion Weir
- Type: state heritage (built)
- Designated: 2 April 1999
- Reference no.: 957
- Type: Weir
- Category: Utilities – Water
- Builders: Department of Public Works

Berembed Weir is a heritage-listed reservoir on the Murrumbidgee River at Matong, in the Riverina region of New South Wales, Australia. It was designed by Ernest de Burgh and built from 1909 to 1910 by the New South Wales Department of Public Works. It is also known as Berembed Diversion Weir. It was added to the New South Wales State Heritage Register on 2 April 1999.

== History ==
Berembed Diversion Weir is the main weir built under the Barren Jack and Murrumbidgee Canals Construction Act 1906. It was to divert water from the Murrumbidgee River into the Main Canal via an offtake regulator. The Weir was designed and its construction supervised by the Rivers Water Supply & Drainage Branch of the New South Wales Department of Public Works in 1909–10.

Berembed is an Aboriginal name for "a heap of rocks". It was where the low hills near the river stood well above the flood levels and a wide granite bar extended under the river bed and banks. The Principal Chief Engineer, L. A. B. Wade, decided that this was a good combination for the siting of a diversion weir to divert water down the main supply canal.

The Diversion Weir comprised a weir proper with 55 collapsible Chanoine wooden wickets, a lock chamber capable of taking barges or steamers up to 100 ft. (30.48m) long, and a sluiceway. An off-take regulator was built at right angle to the weir at the head of the Main Canal.

In 1976–77, the weir was refurbished and the wooden wickets were replaced with fixed concrete which extends across the southern two-thirds of the river's width. In 1977, the Berembed Picnic Grounds was officially opened by Lin Gordon, Minister for Water Resources.

The staff cottage was destroyed by fire in 2012.

== Description ==
The Weir is founded on a solid granite bar extending across the river. It is 82.3m (270') between abutments, and is divided into a sluiceway 12.19m (40') wide, a lock chamber 12.19m (40') wide, and a concrete weir 50.29m (165') wide. The sluiceway and lock chamber area each controlled at their upstream ends by single iron-framed sluice gates of the "Stoney" pattern manufactured by Ransomes & Rapier of Ipswich, England. The total lift of the gates is 10.67m (35'). The original lock-gates at the downstream end of the lock chamber have been removed. The off-take regulator has 10 gates. The gates were originally of tallow-wood and were each in 3 leaves. These gates and the lifting gear were constructed at the Government Fitzroy Dock in Sydney. The gates have since been replaced. The site contains other early structures such as staff cottage, timber pilings, wicket memorial, and rare native flora and fauna.

== Heritage listing ==
Berembed Division Weir is an integral and important part of the ambitious scheme launched under the Barren Jack and Murrimbidgee Canals Act 1906. It is an important structure in the control and diversion of water flow into the Main Canal to the Murrimbidgee Irrigation Area and surrounding districts.

Berembed Weir was listed on the New South Wales State Heritage Register on 2 April 1999.
