= Narrandera =

Narrandera Narrangdhuray
- Town
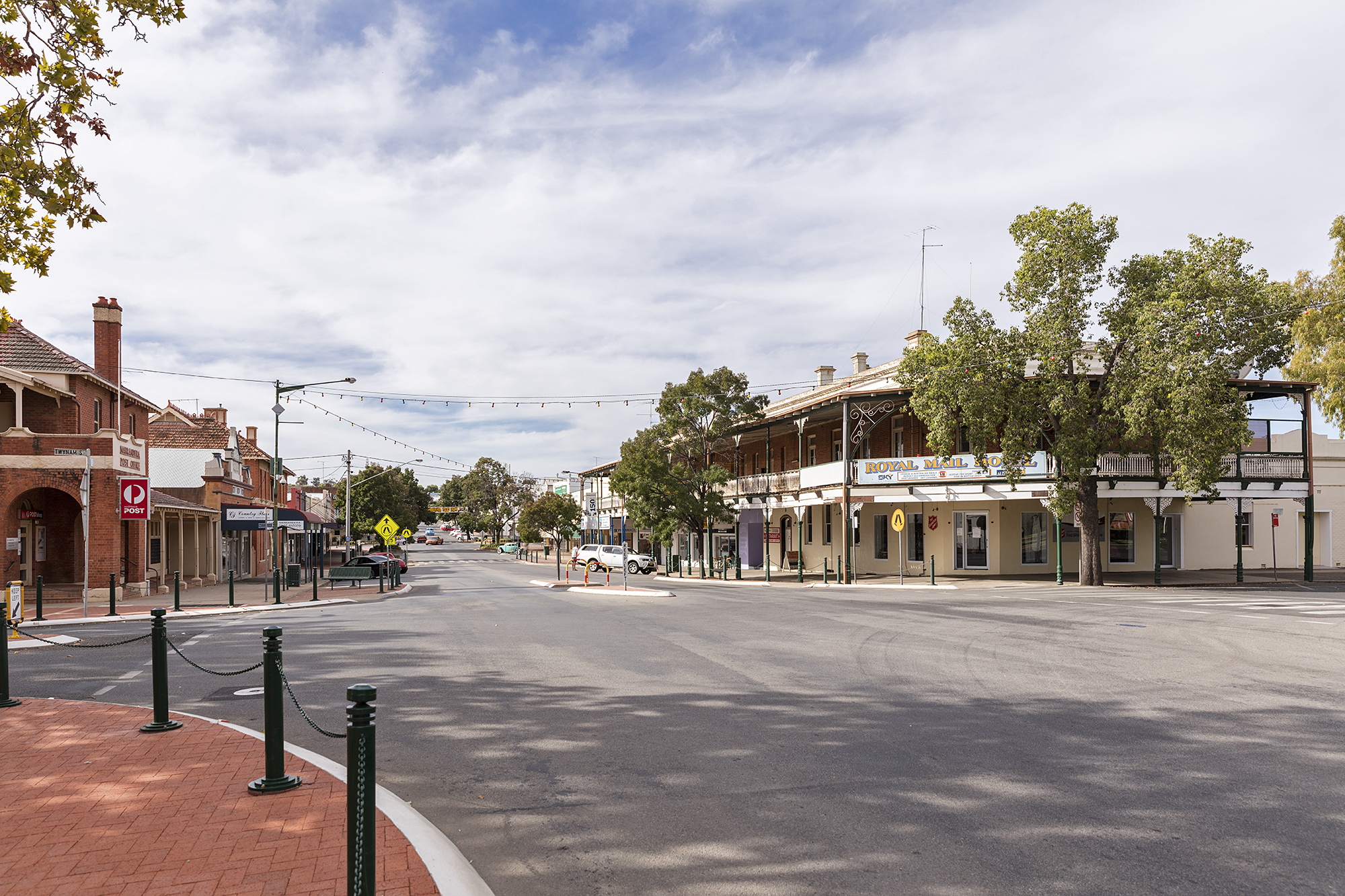
- East Street, main street of Narrandera

- Coordinates: 34°45′0″S 146°33′0″E
- Country: Australia
- State: New South Wales
- LGA: Narrandera Shire
- Location: 549 km (341 mi) from Sydney; 328 km (204 mi) from Melbourne; 98 km (61 mi) from Wagga Wagga; 97 km (60 mi) from Griffith

Government
  - State electorate: Cootamundra
  - Federal division: Farrer
- Elevation: 149 m (489 ft)

Population
  - Total: 3,783 (2021 census)
- Postcode: 2700
- County: Cooper
- Mean max temp: 23.8 °C (74.8 °F)
- Mean min temp: 9.9 °C (49.8 °F)
- Annual rainfall: 444.6 mm (17.50 in)

Narrandera (/nəˈrændərə/ nə-RAN-dər-ə; wiradjuri: Narrangdhuray), until around 1949 also spelled "Narandera", is a town in the central Riverina region of south-western New South Wales, Australia. The town lies on the junction of the Newell and Sturt highways, adjacent to the Murrumbidgee River, and it is considered the gateway to the Murrumbidgee Irrigation Area. At the 2021 census, Narrandera had a population of 3,783.

== History ==
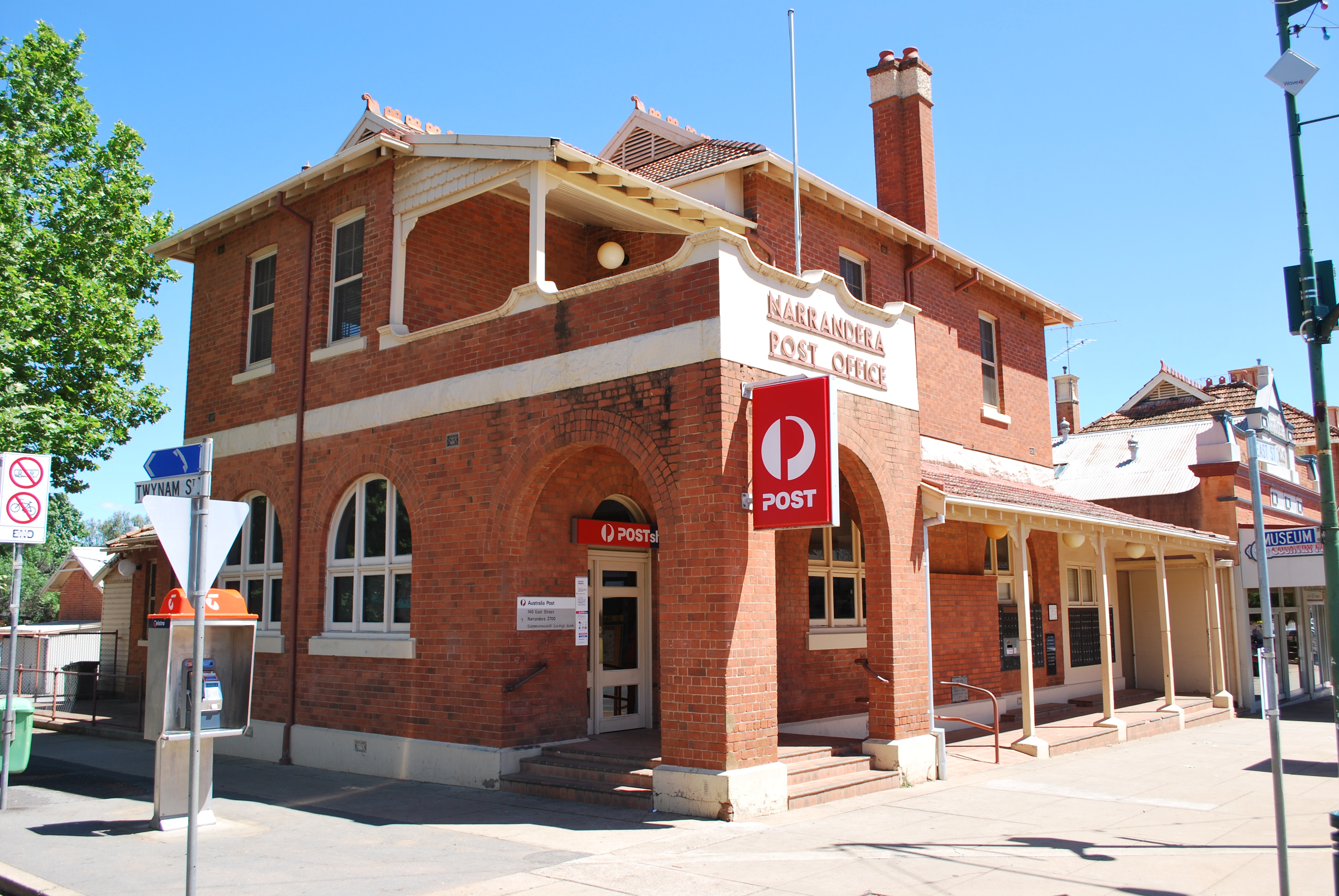
Narrandera Post Office

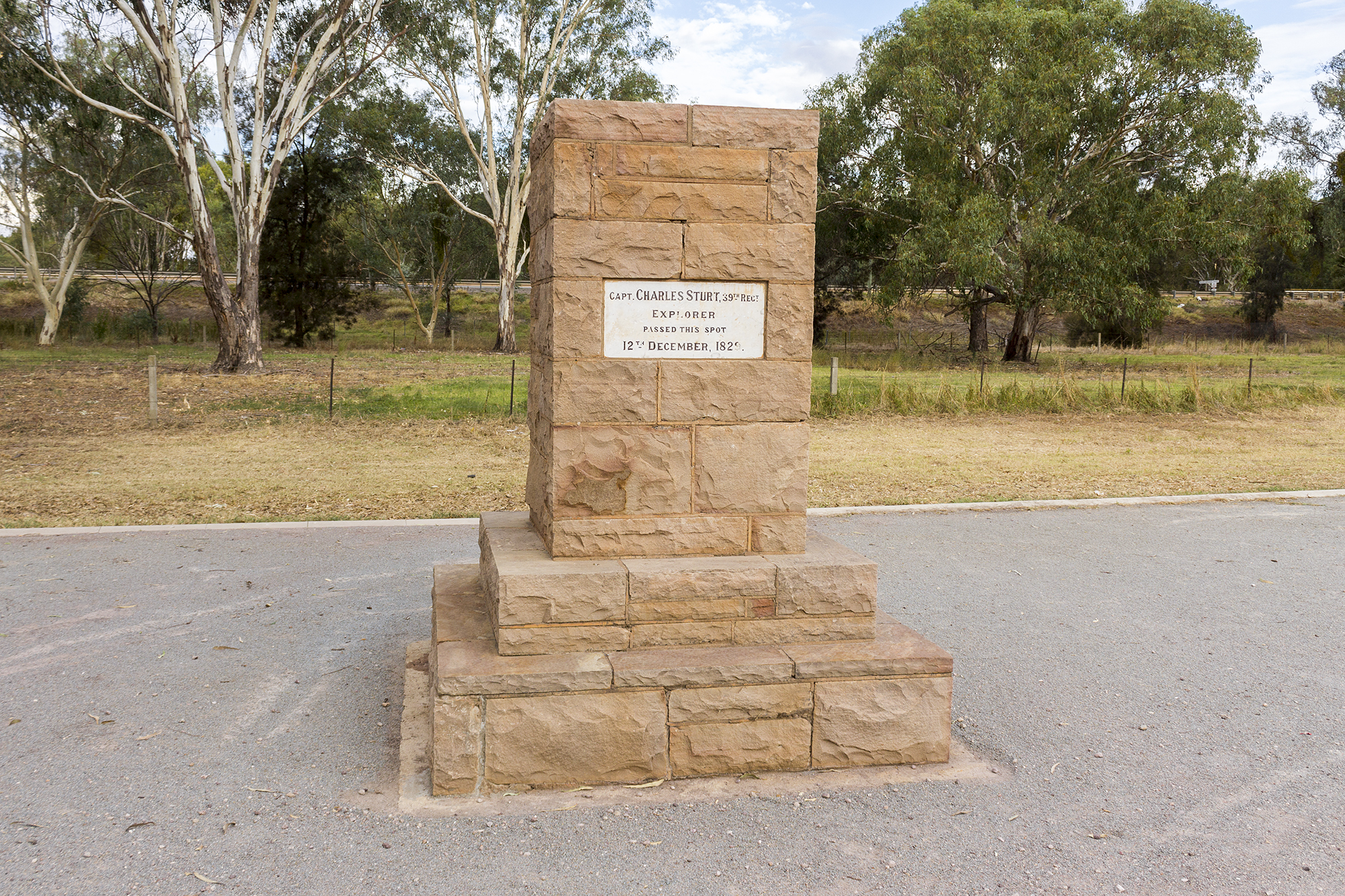
Charles Sturt memorial on the Murrumbidgee River

Narrandera is a river town with a rich heritage. Captain Charles Sturt is credited with being the first European to observe the area that later was to become known as Narrandera. However Sturt, who passed through the district on 12 December 1829, was not the first explorer to cast eyes on the Murrumbidgee River. The upper Murrumbidgee, the "Big Water", was first noted in April 1821 by Charles Throsby. The name Narrandera is derived from the Wiradjuri word nharrang, meaning "frill-necked lizard". and the name of the local Narrungderah clan.

=== Massacre of Narrungderah people ===
The local Aboriginal people of the Wiradjuri nation, were all but destroyed by settlement, disease brought by European settlers, and clashes with the settlers. The last blow was a massacre of the remainder of the Narrungderah clan by a small group of European settlers near what is now referred to as Massacre, or Murdering Island, and is known to have left only one survivor. The people of the Wiradjuri nation who now reside in Narrandera make up ten percent of the population of the town, and predominantly came from the regions south and west of Narrandera, but were dislocated by colonial expansion.

=== Settlement ===
Narrandera had its first recorded mention as a pastoral station or "run" (Narrandera Run) in 1848, at which time the property held by Edward Flood comprised approximately 31,100 hectares (76,800 acres).

In 1850, surveyor James Larmer reserved a site for what would later become Narrandera. The township developed in the early 1860s. Gillenbah post office opened nearby on 1 March 1859 and was replaced by the Narrandera office in 1861. A Gillenbah office was open from 1881 to 1892 and from 1906 to 1941.

The Borough of Narrandera was constituted by proclamation dated 17 March 1885, and gazetted the following day. The centenary of Local Government in Narrandera was celebrated in 1985.

=== 1945 RAAF crash ===
On 3 September 1945, a Royal Australian Air Force Bristol Beaufighter assigned to No. 92 Squadron crashed into the canal at the western end of the town during a joy flight, killing all seven people on board.

=== 2013 sesquicentenary ===
A celebratory weekend event to mark Narrandera's sesquicentenary, named Back to Narrandera 1863 to 2013, was held in early October 2013. The Governor of New South Wales, Marie Bashir AC CVO, who was born in Narrandera, opened the celebrations at a luncheon. During her speech of proclamation she acknowledged the indigenous custodians of the land, and noted that the name Narrandera is a Wiradjuri word for "the place of lizard or goanna". Bashir informed the luncheon guests that 150 years ago 'on this site on the Murrumbidgee River, the beautiful place was officially proclaimed as a town named Narrandera'. Included on the program of events and activities for the celebrations were the Parkside Cottage Museum was open for most of the weekend and displayed many historical artefacts, including archival resources about the P.S. Wagga Wagga; the Murrumbidgee Sheepdog Championships were held; there were Narrandera Cemeteries Heritage Walks; a cocktail party; and a Chinese exhibition. There was also a Railway Memorabilia Display with Vintage Train Rides and the John O'Brien Heritage House was opened to the public; there was a vintage film evening; a classic ball; a Back to the 60's Dance; the Lions Club held a recovery breakfast; and a Ye Olde Town Picnic followed; with other events, including a CWA Devonshire Tea; a farmers' market; and a time capsule was sealed and placed under the Narrandera Clock Tower. The new Rocky Waterholes Bridge was also opened.

== Heritage listings ==
Narrandera has a number of heritage-listed sites, including:

- Elizabeth Street: Narrandera Showground Industrial Hall
- Junee-Hay railway: Murrumbidgee River railway bridge
- Murrumbidgee River: Berembed Weir
- 30–32 Twynam Street: Derrendi
- Whitton Street (Newell Highway): Narrandera railway station
- Murrumbidgee River near: Gogeldrie Weir

== Narrandera today ==
The town of Narrandera is located adjacent to the Murrumbidgee River, at the intersection of the Newell Highway and the Sturt Highway at the centre of a productive agricultural region.

Narrandera now marks the transition between an extensive dry-land area devoted to cereal crops and sheep and wool production to the east, and, to the west, the Murrumbidgee Irrigation Area (MIA) fed by water from the Burrinjuck Dam. The MIA is a region where irrigation has opened the way to a diversity of enterprise, from the growing of rice and other cereals under irrigation to the production of citrus, wine grapes, potatoes, and increasingly, cotton and nuts.

The Narrandera Memorial Gardens include the unusual Hankinson Fountain. Manufactured by the Royal Doulton Company of England, the ceramic fountain is one of only two known to be in existence, the other located in Pakistan. It was given to the people of Narrandera by Alderman and Mrs Hankinson in 1922 in honour of locals who served in World War I.

Narrandera is known for its waterways described below, but in particular for the Lake Talbot Water Park. The waterpark is set in an amphitheatre of shaded lawns. The Water Park features a 50-metre pool, a large children's pool, an infants pool and a water playground as well two giant water-slides. It adjoins Lake Talbot, which is fed by the Bundidgerry Creek. The Lake is used by swimmers water-skiers and canoeists.

The Narrandera Flora and Fauna reserve is home to a Koala Regeneration Reserve. The reserve was set up in the 1970s to return Koalas to the town as they had been wiped out in the region by 1950 through accidental poisoning and through the fur export industry. There are now several hundred healthy Koala in the Reserve and they have bred and spread for many kilometres beyond Narrandera. Kangaroos are also well represented in the Reserve.

Narrandera's immediate surrounds feature a number of waterways, the major waterway being the Murrumbidgee River. Others include Lake Talbot, the Narrandera Wetlands, Bundidgerry Creek, and the ephemeral Lake Coolah.

The town also has number of historic features, such as a fig tree on the corner of King and Cadell Streets, which is thought to be 150 years old; and the Mon Repos, a residence built in a Queen Anne-style, which was built in the 1890s. The Oakbank Brewery Tower located beside the Murrumbidgee on Oakbank Road is a prominent feature, once owned by Lincolns brewers, then by Oakbank Brewery. Its last productive days were as a cordial (soft drink) factory owned by the Webster family of Narrandera.

Narrandera Parkside Museum houses a cloak made from the first bale of Merino wool sent back to England by the MacArthur family.

The Irrigation Canal which flows through the town carries water to the Murrumbidgee Irrigation Area to Narrandera's west. It originates 34 kilometres (21 mi) east at Berembed Weir where water is diverted from the Murrumbidgee River. The canal follows the natural bed of Bundidgerry Creek and in places spreads wide and has no levee banks. Lake Talbot was formed in 1924 when the bank of the Irrigation Canal gave way, flooding the river flat between the canal and Bundidgerry Hill. The shallow body of water was allowed to remain and became an important recreational feature of the town. A wetland has been created off Lizard Drive, only 300 metres (980 ft) from the Murrumbidgee River. The Wetland acts as a collection point for storm water run-off from the town.

== Climate ==
Narrandera has a cold semi-arid climate (BSk) with a substantial range in maximum temperatures throughout the year, typical of the Riverina. Summers are hot and dry with the occasional severe thunderstorm and/or cold front. Winter is cool, partly cloudy and features many days of light, misty drizzle and fog which can persist for multiple days in a row. Snow is virtually unknown in the modern climate, having last occurred on 23 June 1908, 27 July 1901 and 8 August 1899; being some of the lowest-elevation snowfalls recorded in New South Wales (only the snowfall at Hay was lower).

Climate data for Narrandera Airport AWS (1967–2024); 145 m AMSL; 34.71° S, 146.51° E
Month	Jan	Feb	Mar	Apr	May	Jun	Jul	Aug	Sep	Oct	Nov	Dec	Year
Record high °C (°F)	47.4 (117.3)	45.8 (114.4)	41.9 (107.4)	38.1 (100.6)	30.4 (86.7)	23.7 (74.7)	25.3 (77.5)	29.1 (84.4)	38.2 (100.8)	38.2 (100.8)	44.0 (111.2)	45.1 (113.2)	47.4 (117.3)
Mean daily maximum °C (°F)	33.6 (92.5)	32.1 (89.8)	28.7 (83.7)	23.8 (74.8)	18.9 (66.0)	15.1 (59.2)	14.4 (57.9)	16.1 (61.0)	20.0 (68.0)	24.4 (75.9)	28.0 (82.4)	31.1 (88.0)	23.8 (74.9)
Mean daily minimum °C (°F)	17.8 (64.0)	17.2 (63.0)	14.2 (57.6)	9.7 (49.5)	6.4 (43.5)	4.0 (39.2)	3.2 (37.8)	3.7 (38.7)	5.7 (42.3)	9.2 (48.6)	12.5 (54.5)	15.0 (59.0)	9.9 (49.8)
Record low °C (°F)	5.9 (42.6)	6.0 (42.8)	3.0 (37.4)	−0.2 (31.6)	−2.8 (27.0)	−4.6 (23.7)	−6.1 (21.0)	−4.7 (23.5)	−3.5 (25.7)	−0.3 (31.5)	2.3 (36.1)	4.4 (39.9)	−6.1 (21.0)
Average precipitation mm (inches)	39.2 (1.54)	33.8 (1.33)	34.0 (1.34)	34.5 (1.36)	39.2 (1.54)	38.8 (1.53)	35.9 (1.41)	39.1 (1.54)	35.9 (1.41)	41.3 (1.63)	37.9 (1.49)	35.8 (1.41)	444.6 (17.50)
Average precipitation days (≥ 0.2 mm)	5.1	4.1	4.8	5.4	7.3	10.1	11.4	10.7	8.5	7.4	6.5	5.4	86.7
Average afternoon relative humidity (%)	31	36	36	42	54	64	64	55	50	42	34	33	45
Source 1: Narrandera Airport AWS (general data, 1967–2024)
Source 2: Narrandera Golf Club (humidity & integrated extremes, 1970–2014)

== Transport ==
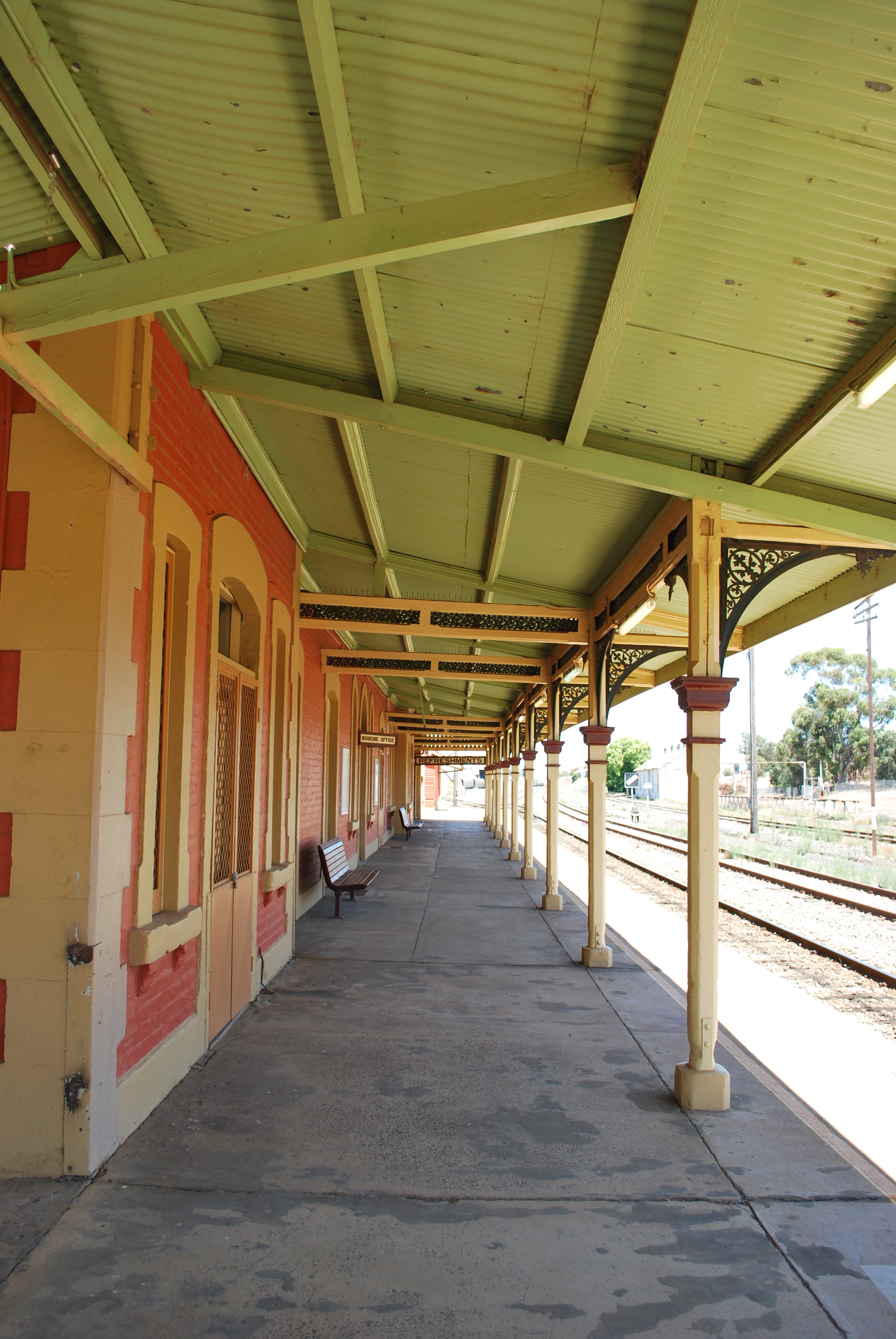
Narrandera railway station

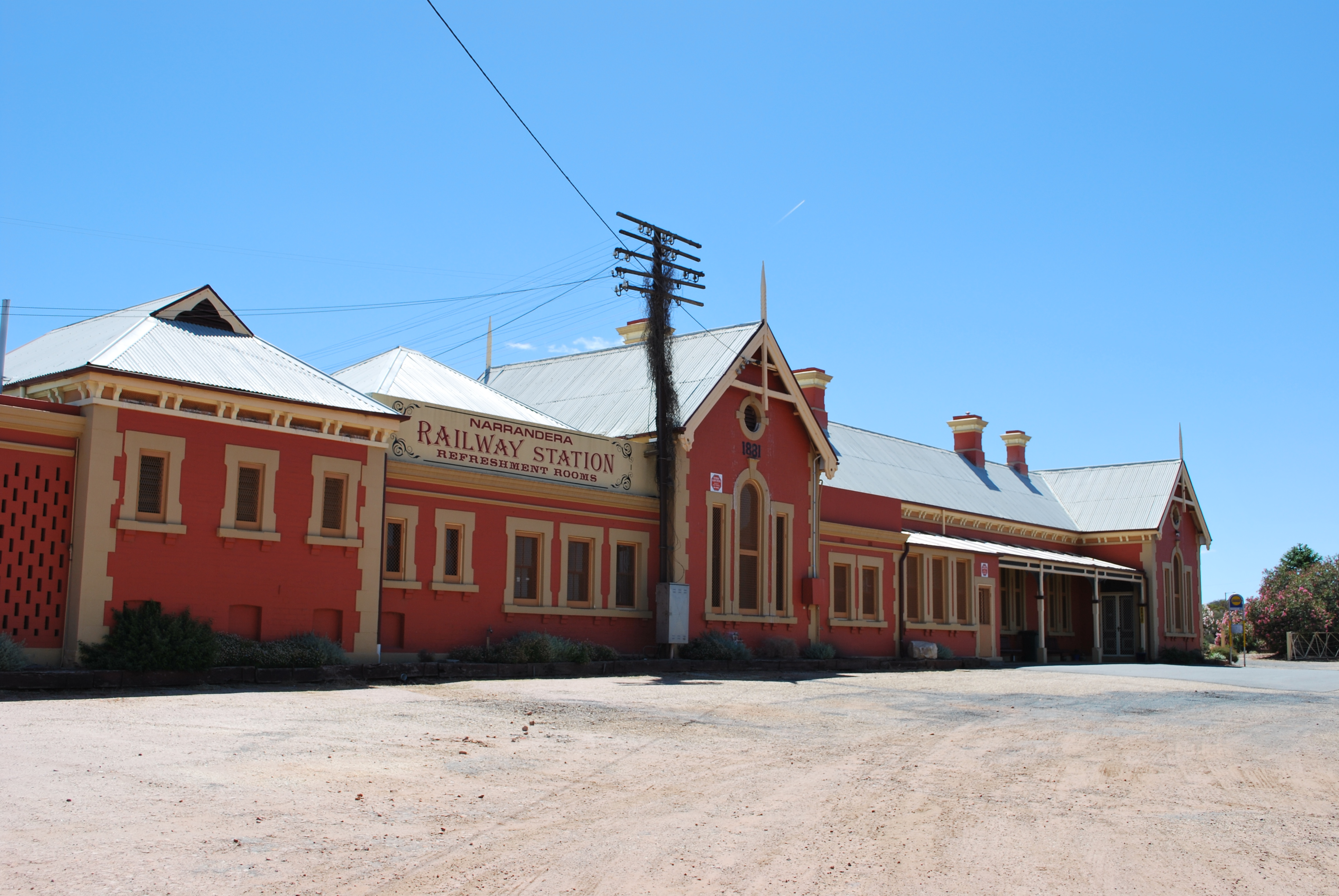
Narrandera railway station

Narrandera is well served for transport. The Sturt Highway and the Newell Highway cross just south of Narrandera. Narrandera Airport is 5 kilometres (3.1 mi) west of the town, and is serviced by Rex Airlines, operating return services daily to Sydney, approximately one hour and 20 minutes' flying time away.

Narrandera is served by a twice-weekly NSW TrainLink Xplorer service operating between Sydney and Griffith. NSW TrainLink also operate a road coach service from Wagga Wagga to Griffith via Coolamon.

== Sports ==
Australian rules football has a long history in Narrandera with a football club formed in 1881 playing matches against Wagga Wagga from 1882 and a strong local competition known as the Central Riverina Football League existing from 1907. The Narrandera Eagles (founded in 1910 as the Narrandera Imperials Football Club) compete in the Riverina Football League, winning premierships in 1986 and 2012. Formerly of the South West competition, the club won 15 titles in that league. The club plays its home games at the Narrandera Sportsground.

Narrandera has a rugby league team competing in the Group 20 competition. Founded in 1921 and known as the Lizards, the club was a foundation member of Group 20 in 1954, fielding teams in the competition every year until the club went into recess at the end of 1999, with the exception of 2003 and 2004. This left the town with no rugby league club from 2005 to 2011 and 2015–17. After briefly amalgamating with neighbouring club Yanco-Wamoon to form Bidgee Hurricanes (2012–14), the club entered recess again before re-forming independently in 2018 and joining the newly re-started Group 17 competition, which it previously played in 2001. After winning back-to-back premierships in 2022 and 2023, the club made the decision to return to Group 20 for the 2026 season, ending a 22-year absence from the competition. The club has won three first grade premierships from their time in Group 20 (1986, 1991, 1999), and plays its home games at the Narrandera Sportsground.

Narrandera also has strong local cricket and basketball competitions.

== Demography ==
Like many rural localities in the area, the population level has progressively declined over a number of years, evidenced as follows:

Selected historical census data for Narrandera urban centre/locality
Census year		2001	2006	2011
Population	Estimated residents on Census night	4,116	3,961	3,871

Historical population
Year	Pop.	±%
1921	2,985	—
1933	4,119	+38.0%
1947	4,186	+1.6%
1954	4,418	+5.5%
1961	4,718	+6.8%
1966	4,914	+4.2%
1971	4,831	−1.7%
1976	4,984	+3.2%
1981	5,013	+0.6%
1986	4,835	−3.6%
1991	4,649	−3.8%
1996	4,678	+0.6%
2001	4,116	−12.0%
2006	3,961	−3.8%
2011	3,871	−2.3%
2016	3,746	−3.2%
2021	3,783	+1.0%
Source: Australian Bureau of Statistics data.

== Notable residents ==
- Dame Marie Bashir, former Governor of New South Wales
- Percy Bushby (1919–1975), Australian rules footballer who played for Essendon in the VFL between 1936 and 1948.
- Daniel Christian, former Australian ODI/T20 International cricketer
- Creswell Eastman AM, endocrinologist, professor of medicine, known for iodine deficiency disorders research.
- Adrian Feint, Australian artist, noted for paintings of flowers and bookplates
- Matt Flynn, Australian rules footballer who is currently a West Coast Eagle, has previously played for GWS Giants.
- Kathleen Gorham, prima ballerina
- Stan Grant Snr, AM, Wiradjuri elder and author who has played a central role in the preservation of the Wiradjuri language
- Sam Groth, Victorian former politician and professional tour tennis player
- Patrick Hartigan, Catholic priest, poet and author who used the pen name, "John O'Brien". The bush ethos celebrated by Hartigan in his writings has been commemorated in the once annual John O'Brien Bush Festival and in the local John O'Brien Heritage Museum.
- Victor Hugo, Australian rules footballer
- Cliff Lyons, former professional rugby league footballer who represented Manly Sea Eagles, the NSW and Australian teams
- Graham Lyons, former professional rugby league footballer who represented South Sydney, Balmain, Penrith and New South Wales
- Terry O'Neill, former Australian rules footballer who played for South Melbourne, Fitzroy and captained Queensland
- Dylan Pietsch, professional rugby union player with Australia and New South Wales Waratahs
- Michael Salafia, former professional rugby league footballer and Italian representative
- Tim Ruffles, former Australian rules footballer for Fremantle
- Zac Williams, Australian rules footballer, who currently plays for Carlton, has previously played for the GWS Giants

== In popular culture ==
The novel Jessica, by Bryce Courtenay, mentions Narrandera several times as the main town near the place where the book is set.

== Gallery ==
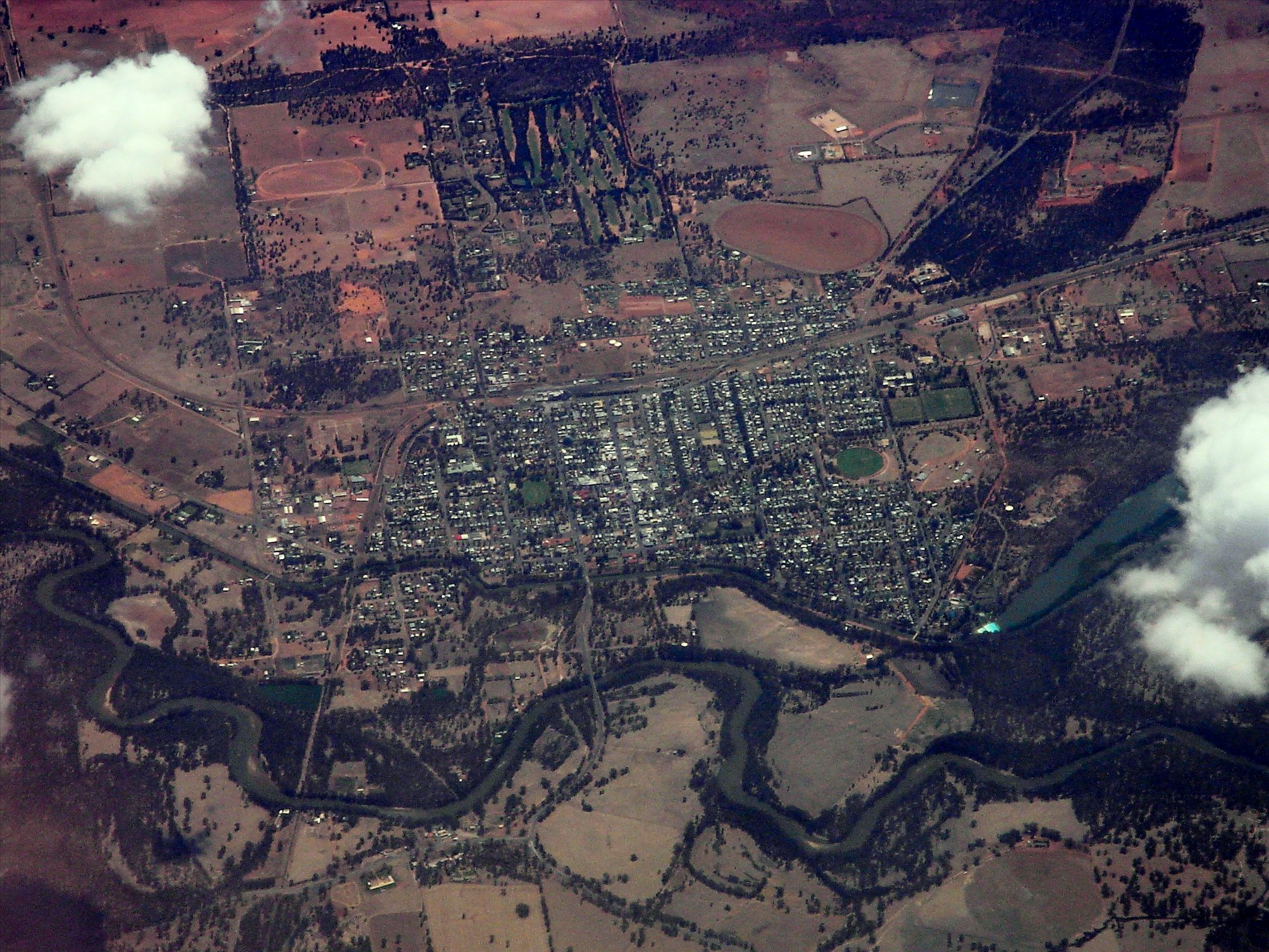
Aerial view of Narrandera
