= Matong =

- Town
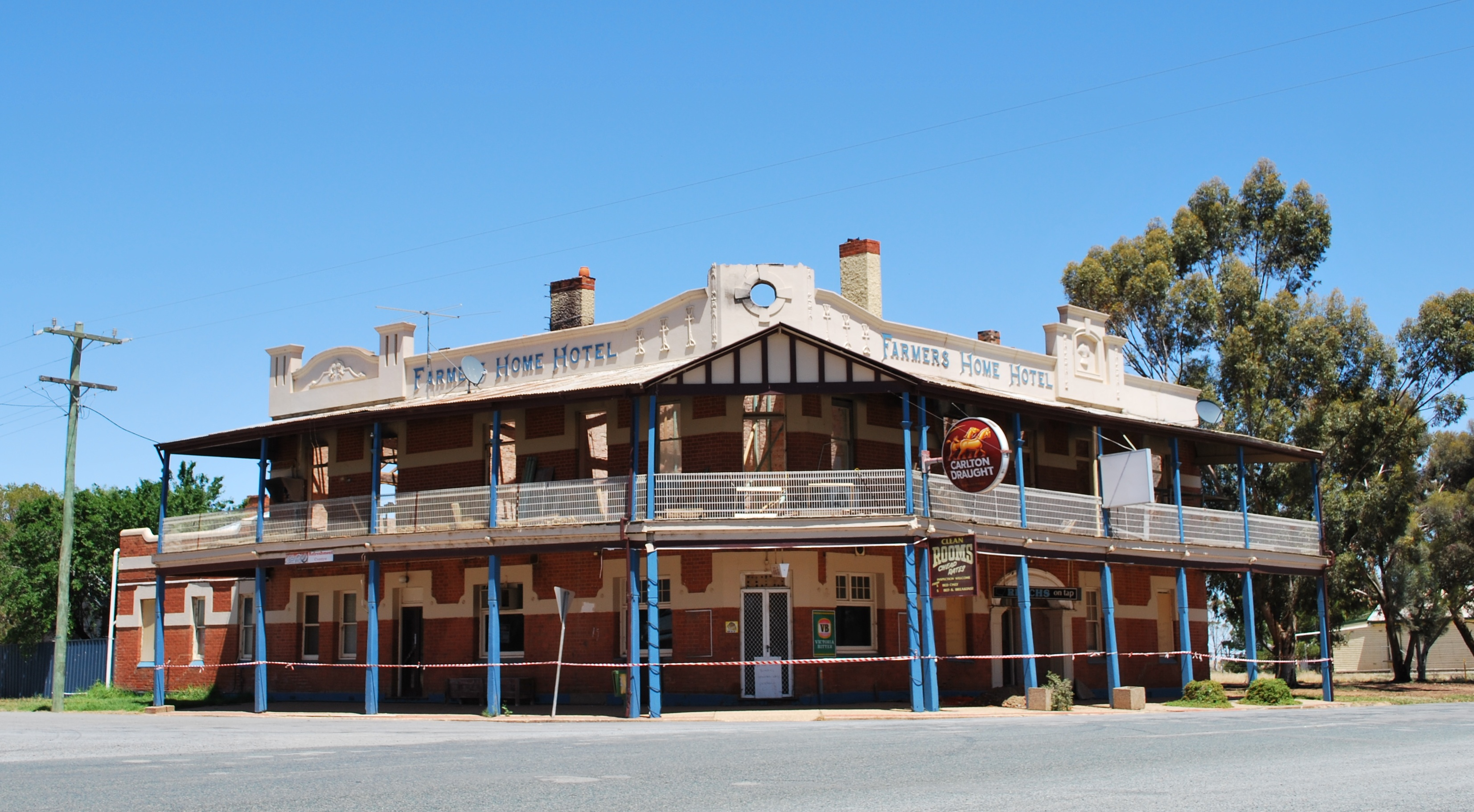
- The Farmers Home Hotel being rebuilt after a fire

- Coordinates: 34°46′0″S 146°55′0″E
- Country: Australia
- State: New South Wales
- LGA: Coolamon Shire
- Location: 496 km (308 mi) SW of Sydney; 492 km (306 mi) NW of Melbourne; 70 km (43 mi) NW of Wagga Wagga; 36 km (22 mi) E of Narrandera; 11 km (6.8 mi) W of Ganmain

Government
  - State electorate: Cootamundra
  - Federal division: Riverina
- Elevation: 192 m (630 ft)

Population
  - Total: 159 (SAL 2021)
- Postcode: 2652
- County: Bourke

Matong /məˈtɒŋ/ is a town in the central east part of the Riverina region of New South Wales, Australia. The town is 37 kilometres (23 mi) east of Narrandera and 26 kilometres (16 mi) west of Coolamon. At the 2016 census, Matong had a population of 164 people. At the 2021 census, Matong had a population of 159.

== Sport ==
The most popular sport in Matong is Australian rules football, as it lies on the Canola Way, a geographical pocket stretching from Grong Grong and Marrar, in which Australian football retains a strong following, despite New South Wales being a largely rugby league supporting state. The local team, Ganmain-Grong Grong-Matong, plays in the Riverina Football Netball League.

== Gallery ==
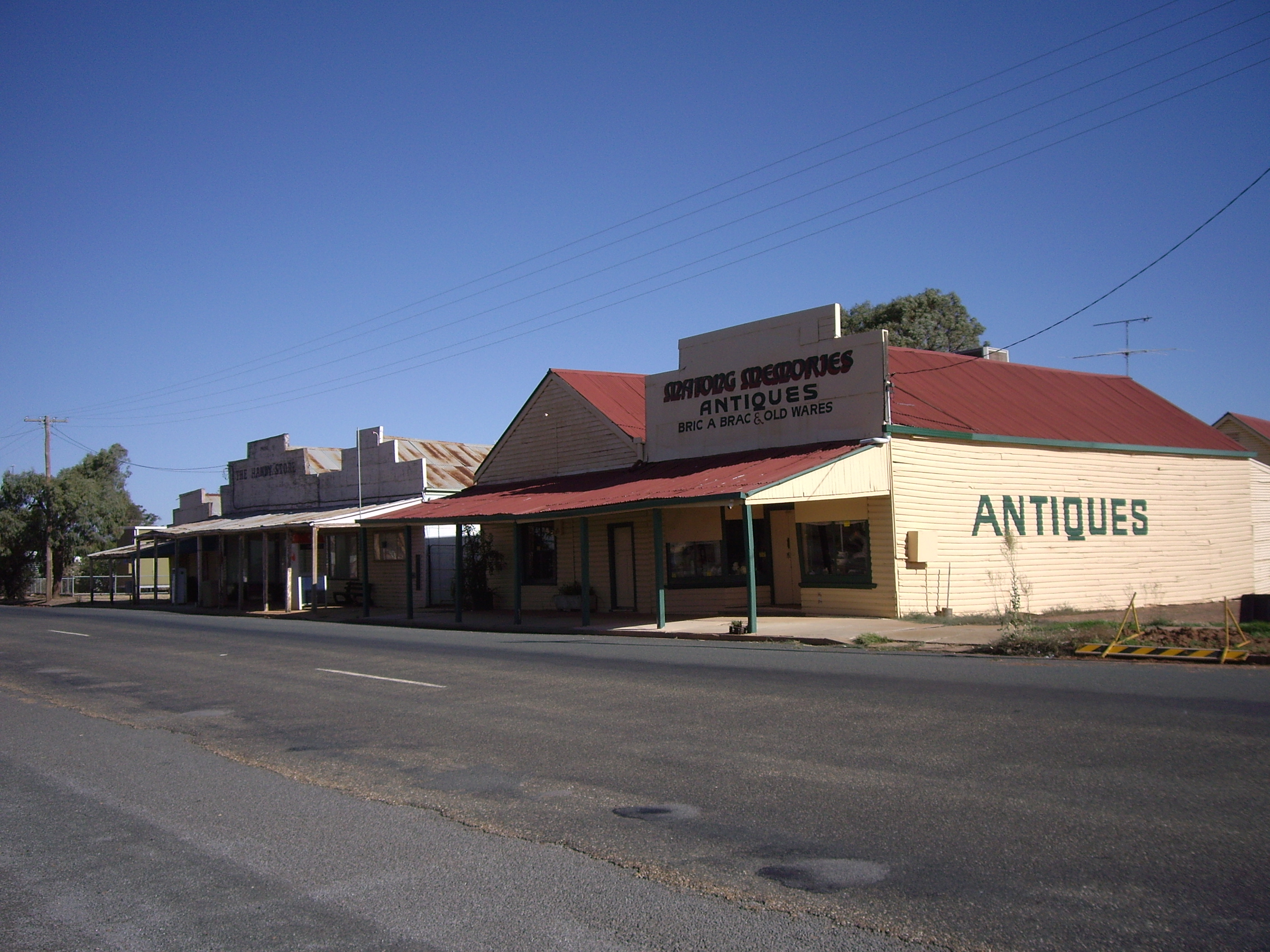

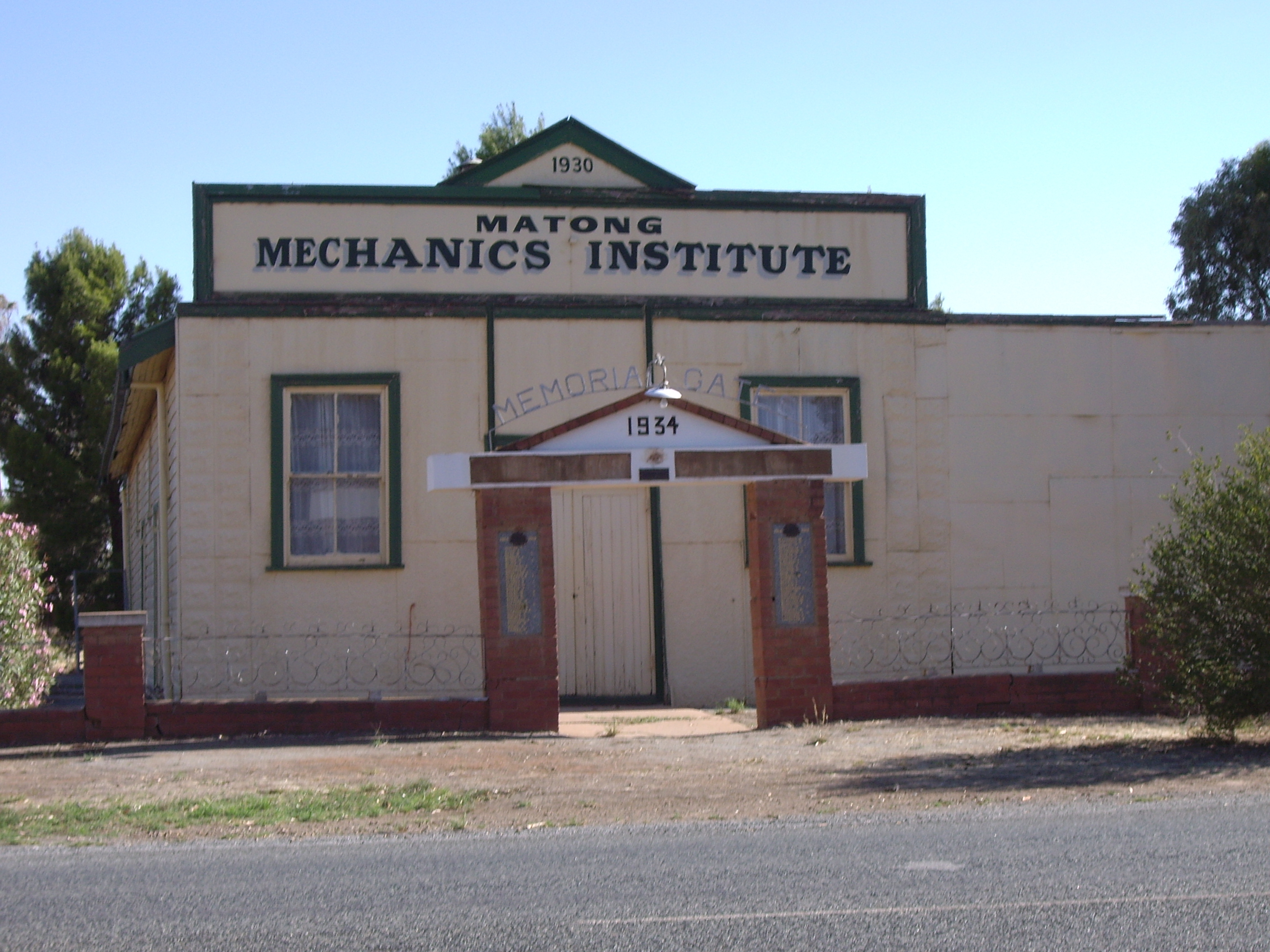
Mechanics Institute

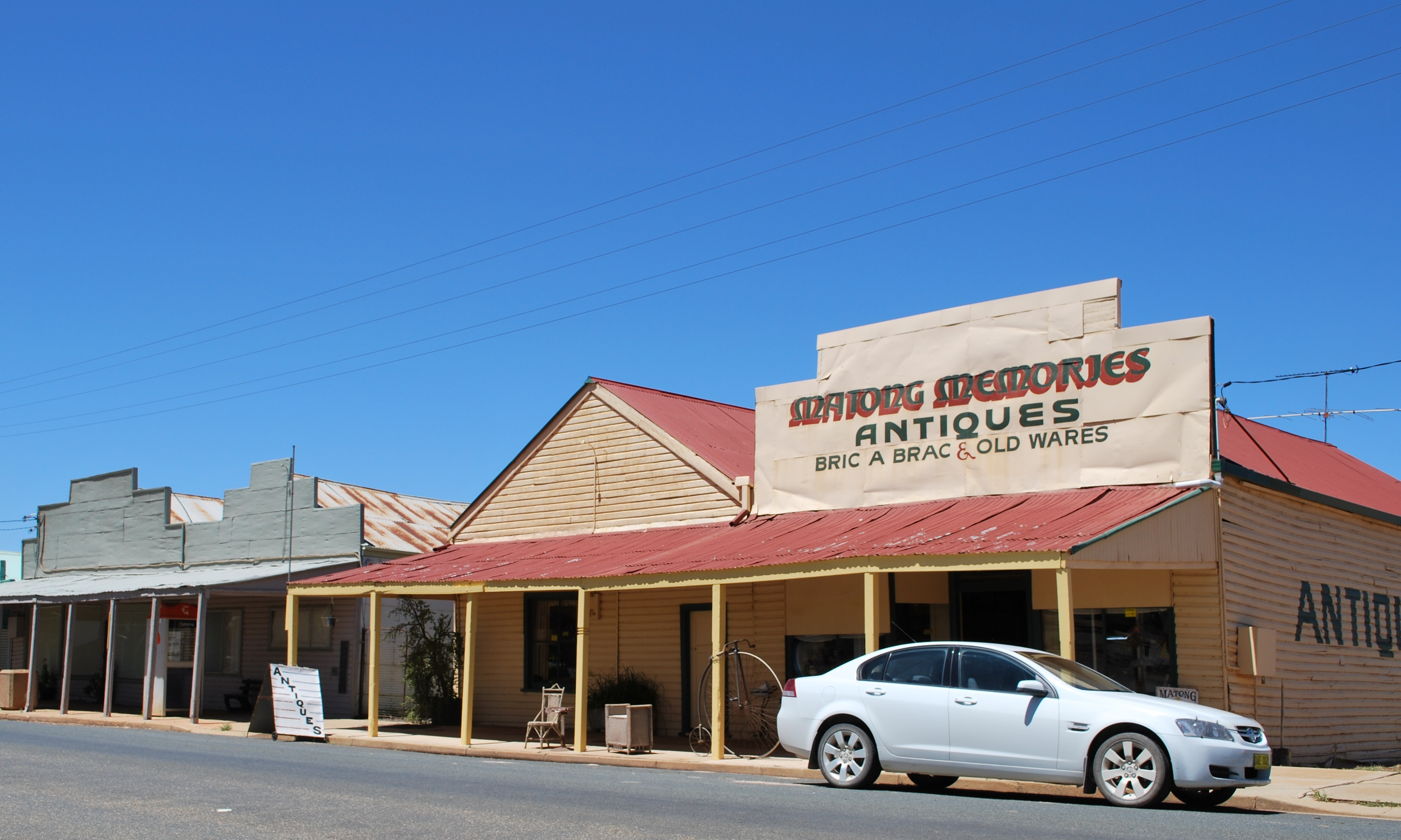
Shop

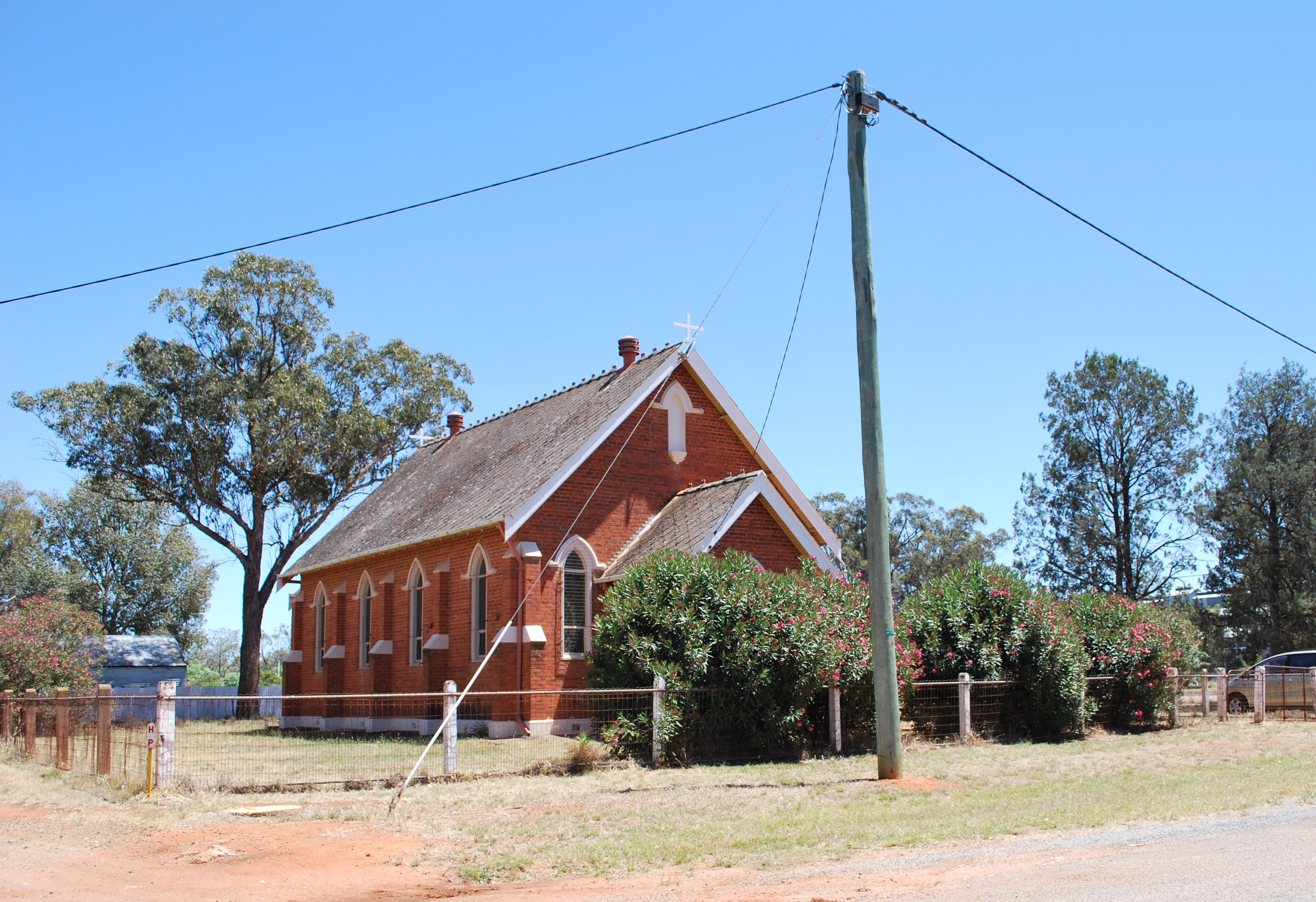
Church Building

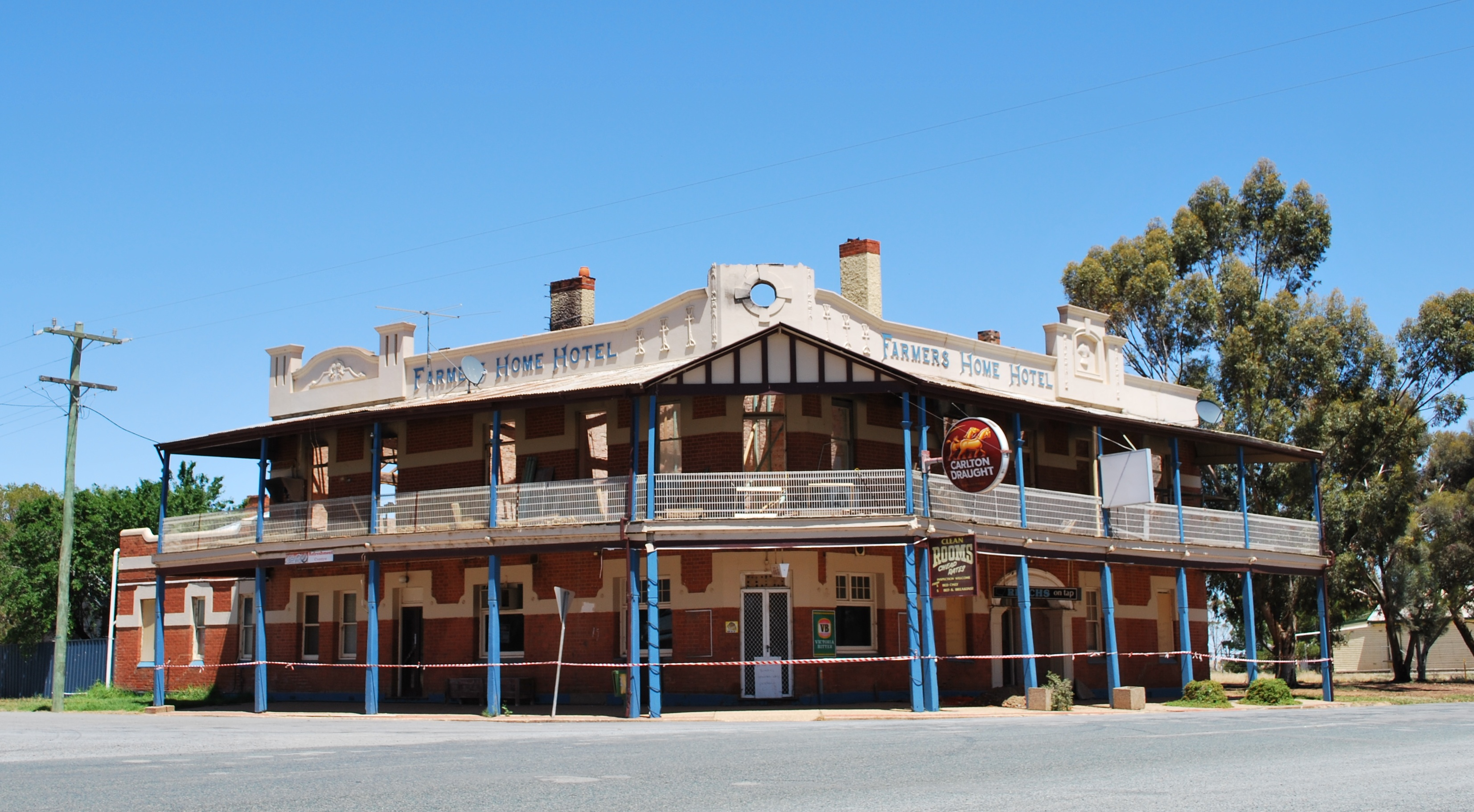
Hotel

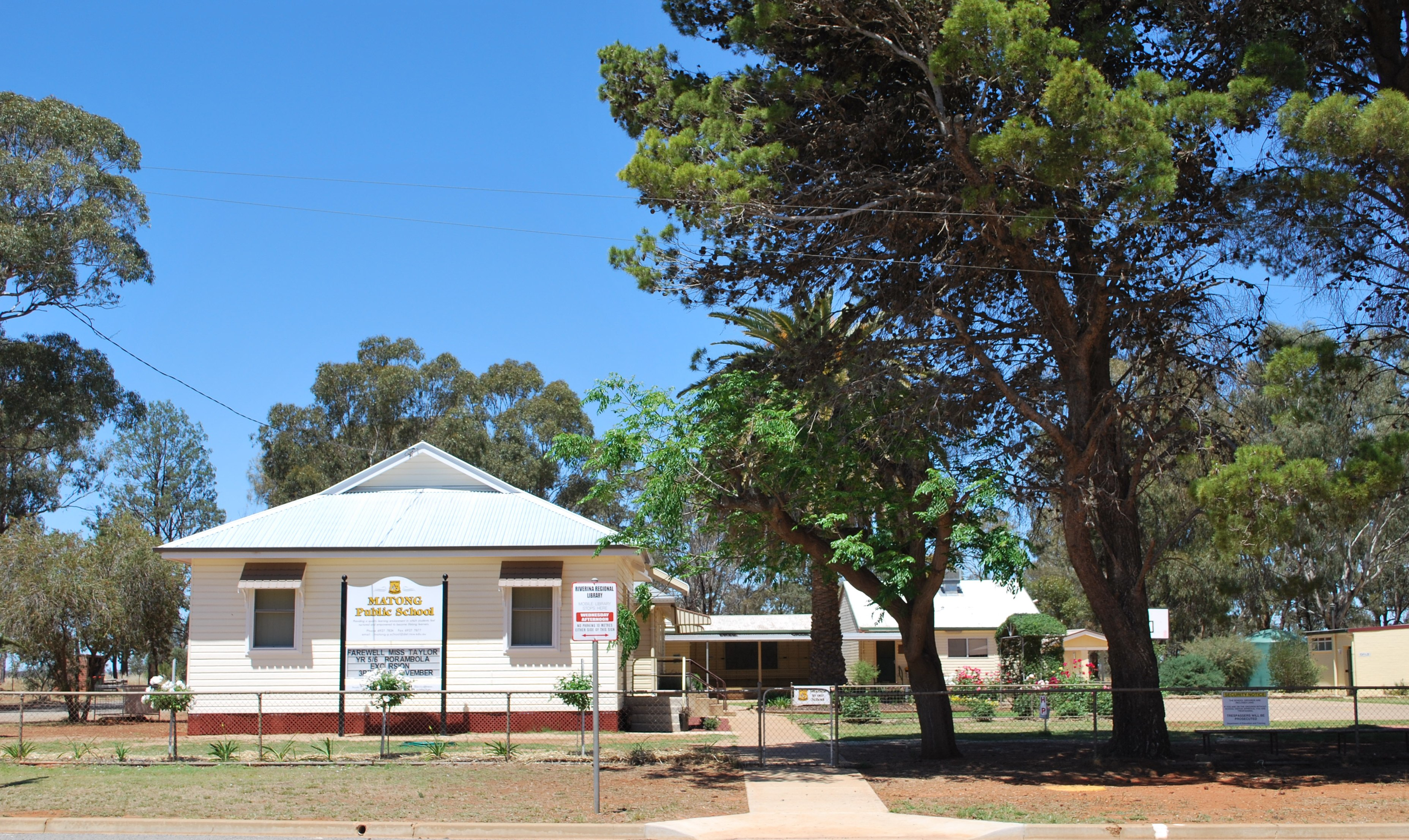
Public School

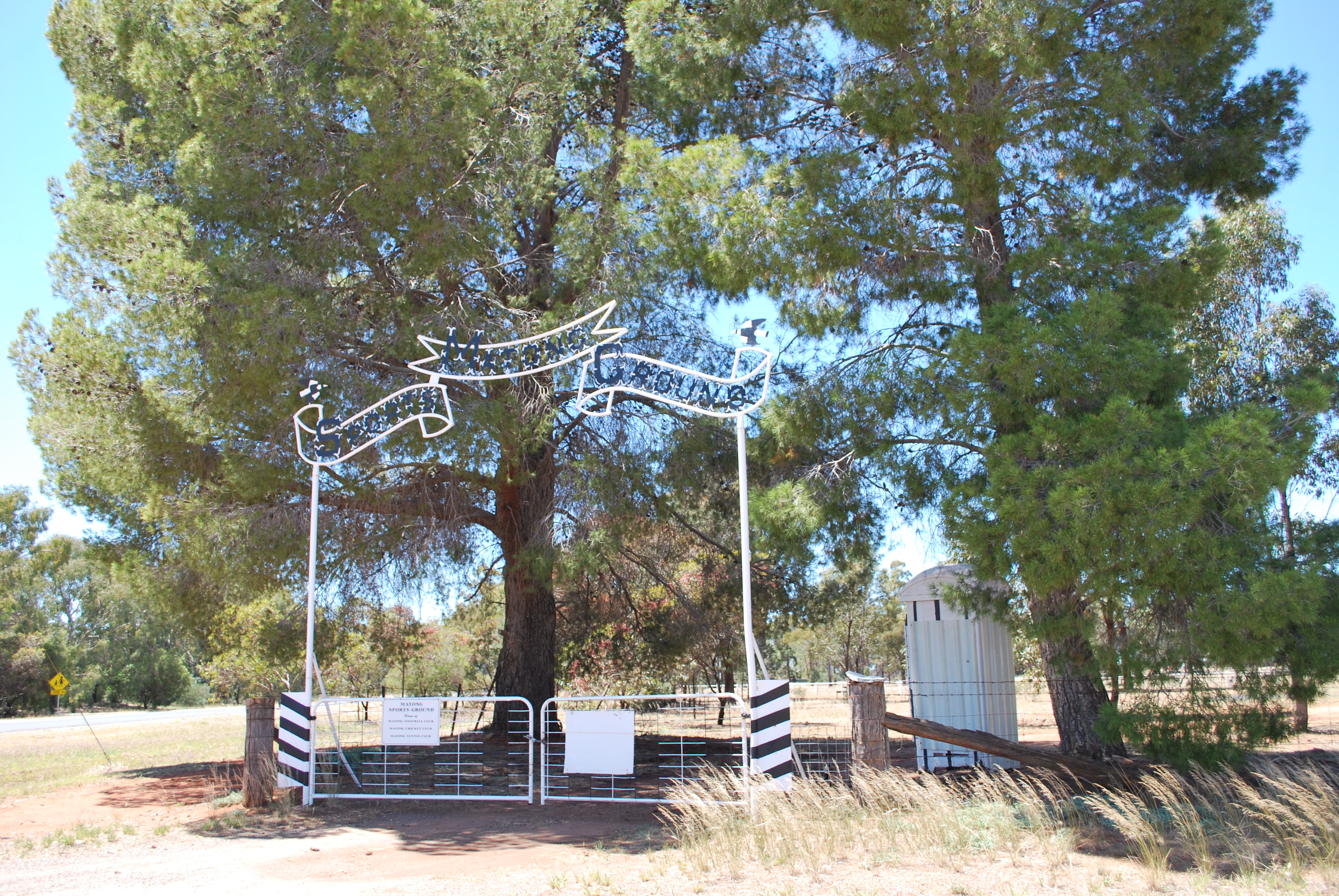
Ovals

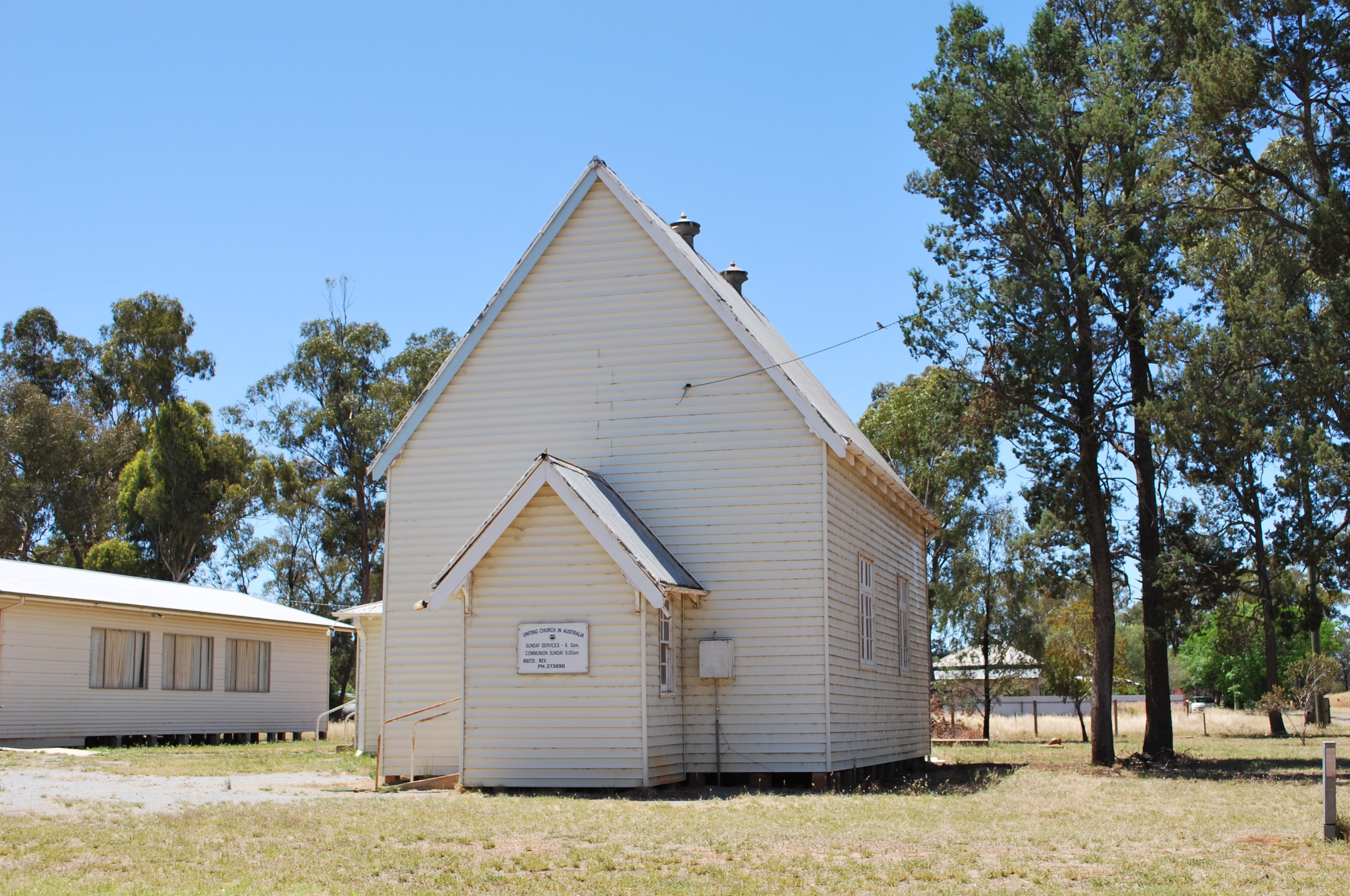
Uniting Church

== Notes and references ==
Preceding station	Former services	Following station
Grong Grong towards Hay	Hay Line	Ganmain towards Junee
