= South West District Football League (New South Wales) =

Former Australian rules football competition

The South West District Football League was a major Australian rules football competition which ran from 1910 until 1981 in the Riverina region of New South Wales.

== History ==
The first recorded Australian Rules Football match in the Riverina area was on 1 August 1881 between Wagga Wagga and the more experienced Albury team and was played in Wagga.

The South West District Football Association (SWDFL) was formed in 1913, when it superseded the Ganmain Football Association, which was formed in 1910, with all clubs moving into play in the SWDFL competition.

In 1924 a South Western District Football League team played Collingwood Football Club at Narrandera with Collingwood winning, 86 to SWDFL 76.

In May, 1930 the SWDFL competition was abandoned, after Whitton withdrew earlier at the AGM, then both Ganmain and Matong club withdrew due to a lack of players. In the 1931 SWDFL grand final, Jim Ceely, from Matong FC received a trophy for best player on the ground.

In August 1933, Melbourne Football Club played a match at Narandrea Park Oval against a SWDFL representative team, with Melbourne: 15.19 - 109 defeating SWDFL: 8.20 - 68. In 1934, a SWDFL representative team played a match at Leeton against a combined Hawthorn - Footscray team, with Hawthorn - Footscray: 20.15 - 135 defeating the SWDFL: 6.11 - 47.

In 1937 and 1938, both Ganmain & Matong football clubs pulled out of the SWDFL and thus the SWDFL went into recess. In April, 1939, the SWDFL was reformed with the following seven clubs taking part - Coolamon, Ganmain, Griffith, Grong Grong, Leeton, Matong and Narandera.

Laurie Taylor and Dudley Smith from Coolamon FC, played for New South Wales against Victoria in July, 1949, at the Sydney Cricket Ground.

In 1953, Ariah Park FC and Mirrool FC merged and entered one senior team & one reserves team in the SWDFL. Ardlethan FC joined the SWDFL in 1954 and wore a jumper featuring three vertical stripes, black, gold and red.

In 1959, former Brownlow Medalist, Grong Grong Matong captain-coach, Peter Box won the Gammage Medal, but SWDFL officials later decide that coaches would be ineligible to win the league award in future years.

The SWDFL first played in the Victorian Country Football League in 1961 and in 1964, won the Victorian Country Football Championships, with SWDFL: 13.14 - 92 defeating the Hampden Football League: 9.16 - 70 in the grand final, played at Narrandera. In 1969, Ricky Quade and Frank Gumbleton both finished third in the SWDFL best and fairest award, the Gammage Medal, with both going on to have fine VFL careers.

Mr. Jim Quinn was President of the South Western District Football League for 25 consecutive years, before resigning on Monday 5 April 1976 due to ill health.

The league was forced to merge with the Central Riverina Football League and the Farrer Football League to form the Riverina Football League and Riverina District Football League in 1982, under the recommendations from the VCFL, with the CRDFL changing its name to the Farrer Football League in 1985. It was between 1983 and 1994 that the Riverina District Football League / Farrer Football League maintained a two division system.

== Clubs ==
=== Final Clubs ===
| Club | Colours | Nickname | Home Ground | Former League | Est. | Years in SWDFL | SWDFL Senior Premierships | | Fate |
| Club | Colours | Nickname | Home Ground | Former League | Est. | Years in SWDFL | Total | Years | Fate |
|---|---|---|---|---|---|---|---|---|---|
| Ardlethan | (1954-?(?-1981) | Stars | Ardlethan Sports Ground, Ardlethan | B&DFL | 1907 | 1954-1981 | 0 | - | Moved to Riverina FL following 1981 season |
| Ariah Park-Mirrool | | Brown Bombers | Ariah Park Recreation Reserve, Ariah Park | – | 1952 | 1952-1981 | 3 | 1954, 1955, 1962 | Moved to Riverina FL following 1981 season |
| Coolamon Rovers | (1960s)(?-1981) | Hoppers | Kindra Park, Coolamon | G&DFA, WFA | 1894 | 1913, 1918-1929, 1931-1932, 1934-1936, 1939-1940, 1946-1981 | 5 | 1920, 1922, 1959, 1970, 1973 | Unaffiliated in 1930. Recess in 1914 and 1933. Played in Wagga FA in 1937-38 and 1941. Moved to Riverina FL following 1981 season |
| Cootamundra | | Blues | Clarke Oval, Cootamundra | CRFL | 1960 | 1981 | 0 | - | Moved to Riverina District FL following 1981 season |
| Ganmain | | Maroons | Ganmain Sports Ground, Ganmain | G&DFA, WFL | 1893 | 1913-1914, 1919-1929, 1931-1936, 1946, 1949-1981 | 13 | 1925, 1935, 1940, 1946, 1949, 1950, 1951, 1953, 1956, 1957, 1964, 1965, 1969, 1976 | Played in Wagga FA in 1938 and 1947-48. Played in Coolamon & District FA in 1945. Merged with Grong Grong-Matong to form Ganmain-Grong Grong-Matong in Riverina FL following 1981 season |
| Griffith | | Swans | Griffith Exies Oval, Griffith | LDFL | 1914 | 1939-1940, 1946-1981 | 2 | 1952, 1968 | Played in Leeton & District FA in 1941. Moved to Riverina FL following 1981 season |
| Grong Grong Matong | | Magpies | Grong Grong Sports Ground, Grong Grong and Matong Sports Ground, Matong | – | 1952 | 1952-1981 | 0 | - | Merged with Ganmain to form Ganmain-Grong Grong-Matong in Riverina FL following 1981 season |
| Leeton | (1930-?)(?-1941)(1946) | Redlegs | Leeton Showgrounds, Leeton | G&DFA, LDFL | 1912 | 1914, 1919-1929, 1931-1936, 1939-1940, 1946-1981 | 7 | 1927, 1936, 1939, 1958, 1971, 1975, 1978 | Played in Leeton & District FA in 1930, 1937-1938 and 1941. Moved to Riverina FL following 1981 season |
| Narrandera Imperial | | Eagles | Narrandera Sports Ground, Narrandera | G&DFA, LDFL | 1910 | 1913-1914, 1919-1929, 1931-1934, 1936, 1939-1940, 1946-1981. | 15 | 1913, 1914, 1924, 1928, 1932, 1933, 1947, 1948, 1960, 1966, 1967, 1972, 1974, 1979, 1981. | Unaffiliated in 1930. Recess in 1925. Played in Leeton & District FA in 1936-1938 and 1941. Moved to Riverina FL following 1981 season |
| Turvey Park | | Bulldogs | Maher Oval, Wagga Wagga | CRFL | 1954 | 1956-1981 | 3 | 1961, 1977, 1980 | Moved to Riverina FL following 1981 season |

=== Former clubs ===
| Club | Colours | Nickname | Home Ground | Former League | Est. | Years in SWDFL | SWDFL Senior Premierships | | Fate |
| Club | Colours | Nickname | Home Ground | Former League | Est. | Years in SWDFL | Total | Years | Fate |
|---|---|---|---|---|---|---|---|---|---|
| Barellan United | | Kangaroos | Barellan Sportsground, Barellan | B&DFL | 1970 | 1972 | 0 | - | Moved to Central Riverina FL in 1973 |
| Darlington Point | | Pointers, Riversiders, Blues | Darlington Point Football Ground, Darlington Point | LDFL | 1906 | 1951-1954 | 0 | - | Recess in 1955. Re-formed in Barellan & District FL in 1956 |
| Federals | | Federals | Rannock Recreation Reserve, Rannock | AP&DFA | 1951 | 1952-1955 | 0 | - | Entered recess following 1955 season, re-formed in Central Riverina FL as Rannock in 1962 |
| Grong Grong | | Blues | Grong Grong Sports Ground, Grong Grong | G&DFA, GG&DFA, LDFL | 1890s | 1913-1914, 1919-1929, 1931-1933, 1935-1936, 1939-1940, 1946-1947, 1951 | 0 | - | Played in Grong Grong & District FA in 1930. Recess in 1934. Played in Leeton & District FA in 1937-38 and 1948-50. Merged with Matong to form Grong Grong-Matong following 1951 season (reserves only that year) |
| Hay | | Rovers | Hay Recreation Reserve, Hay | LDFL | 1937 | 1951, 1973 | 0 | - | Moved to Edward River FL in 1952. Fielded a Third Grade team for one year in 1973. |
| Junee | (1920s)(1949-52) | Bulldogs | Laurie Daley Oval, Junee | G&DFA, WFL | 1919 | 1919-1922, 1924, 1926-1927, 1949-1952 | 1 | 1921 | Moved to Wagga FA in 1923 and 1953. Recess in 1925 and between 1928-36, re-formed in Wagga FA in 1937 |
| Marrar | (1932)(1949-51) | Bombers | Langtry Oval, Marrar | WFL | 1918 | 1918-1926, 1932, 1949-1951 | 3 | 1918, 1919, 1923 | Recess between 1927-31 and in 1933. Re-formed in Rannock & District FA in 1934. Moved to Albury & District FL in 1952. |
| Matong | | Magpies | Matong Sports Ground, Matong | G&DFA, GG&DFA, LDFL | 1900 | 1913-1914, 1918-1929, 1931-1936, 1939-1940, 1946-1951 | 2 | 1926, 1931 | Played in Grong Grong & District FA in 1930. Recess in 1937, re-formed in Leeton & District FA in 1938. Merged with Grong Grong to form Grong Grong-Matong following 1951 season |
| Whitton | (1929)(1947-79) | Tigers | Whitton Recreation Ground, Whitton | MIAFL, LDFL | 1890s | 1929, 1947-1979 | 0 | - | Moved to Leeton & District FA in 1930. Moved to Central Riverina FL after Rd.1, 1979. |
| Yanco | | Penguins | Yanco Sportsground, Yanco | L&DFA | 1918 | 1951-1952 | 0 | - | Recess in 1953-54, re-formed in Barellan & District FL in 1955 |

== Football Premierships ==
In 1931, the Page Final Four System was introduced by the VFL.

Seniors

| Year | Premiers | Score | Runners up | Score | Venue | Gate | Umpire | Notes |
|---|---|---|---|---|---|---|---|---|
| | Ganmain & DFA | | | | | | | |
| 1910 | Ganmain | | Matong | | Ganmain | | | |
| 1911 | Matong | | | | | | | Matong were unbeaten in 1911 |
| 1912 | Matong | 27 | Ganmain | 12 | | | | "Final" |
| | South West DFA | | | | | | | |
| 1913 | Narrandera | 4.7 - 31 | Matong | 3.8 - 26 | Matong | | | |
| 1914 | Narrandera | 126 | Matong | 22 | Narandera Park | £8/14s | Pitcher | Roach Guest Cup |
| 1915-17 | | | | | | | | SWDFL in recess due to WW1 |
| 1918 | Marrar | 7.8 - 50 | Ganmain | 1.1 - 7 | Matong | £35 | | Coolamon & DFL. |
| 1919 | Marrar | 37 | Narandera | 10 | Marrar | | Harrod | Played 7/11/19. |
| 1920 | Coolamon | 5.12 - 42 | Narandera | 3.11 - 29 | Ganmain | £78/6s | Norden | Roach Guest Cup |
| 1921 | Junee | 8.12 - 60 | Coolamon | 3.7 - 25 | Junee Park Oval | £60 | A Wickham | W Hardingham Cup |
| 1922 | Coolamon | 4.16 - 40 | Narandera | 3.7 - 25 | Coolamon Racetrack | £66 | Ayling | W Hardingham Cup |
| 1923 | Marrar | 9.9 - 63 | Narandera | 7.9 - 51 | Ganmain | | H Warren | W Hardingham Cup |
| 1924 | Narandera | 9.18 - 72 | Ganmain | 7.9 - 51 | Leeton | £95 | Ayles | J A Alexander Cup |
| 1925 | Ganmain | 10.5 - 65 | Matong | 6.16 - 52 | Ganmain | £85 | | J A Alexander Cup |
| 1926 | Matong | 10.9 - 69 | Leeton | 9.3 - 63 | Leeton | £100 | J Brandon | J A Alexander Cup |
| 1927 | Leeton | 17.10 - 112 | Ganmain | 10.17 - 78 | Narrandera Park | £178 | Arthur Wickham | J A Alexander Cup |
| 1928 | Narrandera | 15.14 - 104 | Leeton | 14.5 - 89 | Gaimain | £95 | Arthur Wickham | John Hunter & Son Cup |
| 1929 | Leeton | 13.16 - 94 | Matong | 9.12 - 66 | Narrandera | £150 | | John Hunter & Son Cup |
| 1930 | | | | | | | | SWDFL in recess. |
| 1931 | Matong | 9.7 - 61 | Narrandera | 7.5 - 47 | Coolamon | | | John Hunter & Son Cup |
| 1932 | Narrandera | 7.8 - 50 | Leeton | 7.7 - 49 | Matong | £55 | L Gillman | John Hunter & Son Cup |
| 1933 | Narandera | 10.13 - 73 | Leeton | 8.18 - 66 | Matong | £68 | R Thompson | John Hunter & Son Cup |
| 1934 | Narrandera | 11.12 - 78 | Matong | 7.9 - 51 | Coolamon | £53/8s | E Pawley | Rody Hogan Cup. No premiership awarded > dispute. |
| 1935 | Ganmain | 13.26 - 104 | Matong | 15.10 - 100 | Ganmain | £78 | C Rowe | BOG: Clonnie Heath |
| 1936 | Leeton | 11.7 - 73 | Matong | 8.11 - 59 | Narrandera Park | £80 | McLean | |
| 1937 | | | | | | | | SWDFL in recess |
| 1938 | | | | | | | | SWDFL in recess. |
| 1939 | Leeton | 16.13 - 109 | Coolamon | 7.15 - 57 | Narrandera | £122 | W Marney | O G Washington Cup |
| 1940 | Gamain | 22.14 - 146 | Coolamon | 10.18 - 78 | Ganmain | £95 | Harry Clayton | Thame & Hinchcliffe Cup |
| 1941-45 | | | | | | | | SWDFL in recess: WW2 |
| 1941 | Leeton | 9.18 - 72 | Narandera | 6.12 - 48 | Narrandera | £48 | Curly Harding | Wartime Competition Kinlock Cup G Final |
| 1946 | Ganmain | 18.17 - 125 | Narrandera | 8.6 - 54 | Matong | | Cleary | |
| 1947 | Narrandera | 11.16 - 82 | Coolamon | 6.10 - 46 | Narrandera | £150 | F H Grant | Bart Nulty Trophy. NFC undefeated in '47. |
| 1948 | Narrandera | 8.11 - 59 | Whitton | 6.9 - 45 | Leeton | 2000+ crowd | D Sullivan | Bart Nulty Trophy |
| 1949 | Ganmain | 12.11 - 89 | Narrandera | 10.10 - 70 | Leeton | £358 | Dennis Fricker | Pat F. Withers Trophy |
| 1950 | Ganmain | 16.12 - 108 | Griffith | 11.10 - 76 | Narrandrea | £474 | J Wallmeyer | Pat F. Withers Trophy |
| 1951 | Ganmain | 7.7 - 49 | Whitton | 5.14 - 44 | Narrandera | £527 | Harry Clayton | Narrandera Argus Trophy |
| 1952 | Griffith | 12.15 - 87 | Whitton | 6.12 - 48 | Narrandera | £686 | Peter Watt | Narrandera Argus Cup |
| 1953 | Ganmain | 13.12 - 90 | Leeton | 13.7 - 85 | Narrandera | £965 | J Sawyer | Narrandera Argus Cup |
| 1954 | Ariah Park Mirrool | 10.20 - 80 | Ganmain | 6.7 - 43 | Narrandera | £1011 | L C Smith | Narrandera Argus Cup |
| 1955 | Ariah Park Mirrool | 15.8 - 98 | Leeton | 12.12 - 84 | Narrandera | £858 | Alan Nash | |
| 1956 | Ganmain | 13.13 - 91 | Ariah Park Mirrool | 9.10 - 64 | Narrandera | £1,023 | Bill Barbour | |
| 1957 | Ganmain | 11.19 - 85 | Ariah Park Mirrool | 8.19 - 67 | Narrandera | £1,053 | Dudley Ridley | |
| 1958 | Leeton | 15.14 - 104 | Coolamon | 14.9 - 93 | Narrandera | £1,281 | Dudley Ridley | |
| 1959 | Coolamon | 13.11 - 89 | Turvey Park | 11.11 - 79 | Narrandera | £1,281 | Dudley Ridley | |
| 1960 | Narrandera | 9.18 - 72 | Turvey Park | 6.8 - 44 | Narrandera | £1,881 | Ron Brophy | |
| 1961 | Turvey Park | 17.23 - 125 | Leeton | 12.13 - 85 | Narrandera | £1,720 | Kevin Jackson | |
| 1962 | Ariah Park Mirrool | 10.20 - 80 | Coolamon | 11.12 - 78 | Narrandera | £1,818 | Ron Brophy | |
| 1963 | Turvey Park | 16.12 - 108 | Leeton | 11.19 - 85 | Narrandera | £1,716 | Stan Fisher | |
| 1964 | Ganmain | 15.8 - 98 | Griffith | 13.18 - 96 | Narrandera | £1,034 | Ron Brophy | |
| 1965 | Ganmain | 12.14 - 86 | Griffith | 6.12 - 48 | Narrandera | £1,548 | Jim Brewer | |
| 1966 | Narrandera | 8.15 - 63 | Griffith | 6.9 - 45 | Narrandera | $3,059 | Peter Sheales | |
| 1967 | Narrandera | 17.15 - 117 | Leeton | 10.21 - 81 | Narrandera | $3,622 | Jim McMaster | |
| 1968 | Griffith | 13.17 - 95 | Ariah Park Mirrool | 10.11 - 71 | Narrandera | $3,542 | Peter Sheales | |
| 1969 | Ganmain | 10.16 - 76 | Griffith | 10.14 - 74 | Narrandera | $3,542 | Graham Huggins | |
| 1970 | Coolamon | 18.21 - 129 | Turvey Park | 13.9 - 87 | Narrandera | $3,108 | Peter Sheales | |
| 1971 | Leeton | 15.18 - 108 | Griffith | 13.12 - 90 | Narrandera | $3,688 | Ian Robinson | |
| 1972 | Narrandera | 15.14 - 104 | Griffith | 7.12 - 54 | Narrandera | $2,939 | Mike Henry | |
| 1973 | Coolamon | 13.15 - 93 | Turvey Park | 12.14 - 86 | Narrandera | $3,487 | Len Sexton | |
| 1974 | Narrandera | 19.17 - 131 | Coolamon | 19.16 - 130 | Narrandra | $3,890 | Neville Nash | |
| 1975 | Leeton | 19.14 - 128 | Turvey Park | 16.14 110 | Narrandera | $5,260 | Neville Nash | |
| 1976 | Ganmain | 20.8 - 128 | Narrandera | 14.17 101 | Narrandera | $8,130 | R H Lyons | |
| 1977 | Turvey Park | 17.14 - 116 | Ariah Park Mirrool | 14.13 - 97 | Narrandera | $6,174 | John Morgan | |
| 1978 | Leeton | 18.16 - 124 | Turvey Park | 16.15 - 111 | Narrandera | $9,400 | Glen James | |
| 1979 | Narrandera | 17.17 - 119 | Ariah Park Mirrool | 15.13 - 103 | Narrandera | $8,771 | Ken Norris | |
| 1980 | Turvey Park | 14.15 - 99 | Coolamon | 12.13 - 85 | Narrandera | $10,133 | Jim Chapman | |
| 1981 | Narrandera | 14.6 - 90 | Ariah Park Mirrool | 10.17 - 77 | Narrandera | $8,661 | Quinn/Russo | |

Reserves

- 1980 - Narrandera: 22.11 - 143 d APM: 15.6 - 96

Under 19's

- 1980 - Turvey Park: 16.13 - 109 d Narrandera: 13.12 - 90

== Football Best and Fairest Award ==
Seniors

WIlliam Gammage Medal (William J. Gammage was the Treasurer of the SWDFL who first donated the medal in 1948)

| Year | Winner | Club | Votes | Runner up | Club | Votes |
|---|---|---|---|---|---|---|
| 1934 | Victor Jones | Matong | | | | |
| 1934 | Keith Parris | Narandera | | | | |
| 1934 | Maurie Mahony | Coolamon | | | | |
| 1939 | Ken Brill | Grong Grong | | | | |
| 1939 | Ray Davis | Matong | | | | |
WIlliam Gammage Medal
| 1948 | Geoff Willis | Griffith | 6 | Les Main | Leeton | 3 |
| 1948 | Geoff Willis | Griffith | 6 | Bluey O'Bryan | Narrandera | 3 |
| 1948 | Geoff Willis | Griffith | 6 | Dudley Smith | Coolamon | 3 |
| 1948 | Geoff Willis | Griffith | 6 | Jazbo Thompson | Whitton | 3 |
| 1948 | Geoff Willis | Griffith | 6 | Terry Woods | Griffith | 3 |
| 1949 | Leo Foley | Narrandera | | Lionel Crump | Griffith | |
| 1950 | Dudley Mattingly & | Matong | 6 | Ron Inch | Coolamon | |
| 1950 | Bernie Pattison | Marrar | 6 | Ron Inch | Coolamon | |
| 1951 | Peter Curtis | Coolamon | 7 | Bernie Pattison | Marrar | 4 |
| 1951 | Peter Curtis | Coolamon | 7 | Len Pedler | Narrandera | 4 |
| 1951 | Peter Curtis | Coolamon | 7 | Terry Wood | Griffith | 4 |
| 1952 | Jack Pattison | Coolamon | 4 | Len Brill | Ganmain | 3 |
| 1952 | Len Pedler | Narrandera | 4 | Tom Roulent | Griffith | 3 |
| 1952 | Len Pedler | Narrandera | 4 | H Turner | Narrandera | 3 |
| 1953 | Kevin Pleming | Ariah Park-Mirrool | 13 | Alan Brill | Ganmain | 8 |
| 1953 | Kevin Pleming | Ariah Park-Mirrool | 13 | J J Brown | GGMU | 8 |
| 1953 | Kevin Pleming | Ariah Park-Mirrool | 13 | Gerald Carroll | Ganmain | 8 |
| 1953 | Kevin Pleming | Ariah Park-Mirrool | 13 | Ron Harris | Leeton | 8 |
| 1953 | Kevin Pleming | Ariah Park-Mirrool | 13 | Len Pedler | Ariah Park - Mirrool | 8 |
| 1953 | Kevin Pleming | Ariah Park-Mirrool | 13 | Rod Walsh | GGMU | 8 |
| 1953 | Kevin Pleming | Ariah Park-Mirrool | 13 | Terry Wood | Griffith | 8 |
| 1954 | Joe Mickilson | Ariah Park-Mirrool | 6 | Jack Tucker | Whitton | 4 |
| 1954 | Joe Mickilson | Ariah Park-Mirrool | 6 | Dan Weldon | Leeton | 4 |
| 1955 | Dan Weldon | Leeton | 3.5 | Arthur Allen | Ardlethan | 3 |
| 1955 | Dan Weldon | Leeton | 3.5 | Len Brill | Ganmain | 3 |
| 1955 | Dan Weldon | Leeton | 3.5 | Tom Dungan | Whitton | 3 |
| 1955 | Dan Weldon | Leeton | 3.5 | Ron Harris | Leeton | 3 |
| 1955 | Dan Weldon | Leeton | 3.5 | Max Kruse | Leeton | 3 |
| 1955 | Dan Weldon | Leeton | 3.5 | Neil Thomson | Ardlethan | 3 |
| 1956 | Jim Stockton | Narrandera | 6 | Arthur Allen | Ardlethan | 4 |
| 1956 | Jim Stockton | Narrandera | 6 | Len Brill | Ganmain | 4 |
| 1956 | Jim Stockton | Narrandera | 6 | Neale Rutzou | Coolamon | 4 |
| 1957 | Vic Hathaway | Griffith | 6 | Pat Quade | Ariah Park Mirrool | 5 |
| 1957 | Vic Hathaway | Griffith | 6 | Mervyn Pieper | Grong Grong Matong | 5 |
| 1958 | Des Lyons | Leeton | 5 | Mervyn Pieper | Grong Grong Matong | 4 |
| 1958 | Bernie Scully | Ariah Park-Mirrool | 5 | Mervyn Pieper | Grong Grong Matong | 4 |
| 1958 | Fred Thompson | Ardelthan | 5 | Mervyn Pieper | Grong Grong Matong | 4 |
| 1959 | Peter Box | Grong Grong Matong | 27 | Ian Gillett | Coolamon | 22 |
| 1960 | Keith Murphy | Turvey Park | 21 | Vic Hathaway | Griffith | 20 |
| 1961 | Vic Hathaway | Griffith | 24 | Gerald Carroll | Ganmain | 21 |
| 1961 | Vic Hathaway | Griffith | 24 | Fred Thompson | Ardlethan | 21 |
| 1962 | Max Kruse Snr | Leeton | 18 | Jim Bloomfield | Narrandera | 17 |
| 1963 | Des Lyons | Leeton | 18 | Terry McGee | Grong Grong Matong | 17 |
| 1963 | Des Lyons | Leeton | 18 | Robbie Nolan | Turvey Park | 17 |
| 1964 | Len Sexton | Griffith | 34 | Bernie Scully | Ariah Park - Mirrool | 19 |
| 1965 | Peter Weidemann | Coolamon | 28 | Robbie Nolan | Turvey Park | 26 |
| 1966 | Frank Hodgkin | Ganmain | 16 | Peter Box | Narrandera | 15 |
| 1966 | Frank Hodgkin | Ganmain | 16 | Mal Russell | Griffith | 15 |
| 1967 | Robbie Nolan | Turvey Park | 17 | R "Lou" Alchin | Leeton | 15 |
| 1968 | Ian Crewes | Ardlethan | 27 | R "Bob" Little | Whitton | 24 |
| 1969 | Alan Hayes | Coolamon | 24 | Harold Evans | Whitton | 19 |
| 1970 | Alan Hayes | Coolamon | 27 | Doug Priest | Ariah Park Mirrool | 24 |
| 1971 | Peter Clarke | Whitton | 20 | Jeff Hemphill | Narrandera | 19 |
| 1972 | Sid Robbins | Griffith | 23 | A Dudley | Leeton | 18 |
| 1972 | Sid Robbins | Griffith | 23 | Jeff Hemphill | Narrandera | 18 |
| 1973 | Barry Day | Ariah Park-Mirrool | 23 | T McPherson | Ganmain | 17 |
| 1973 | Barry Day | Ariah Park-Mirrool | 23 | N Weller | Coolamon | 17 |
| 1974 | Jim Geltch | Whitton | 23 | Stephen Margosis | Narrandrea | 22 |
| 1975 | Jim Prentice | Ariah Park-Mirrool | 26 | Joe Darby | Ganmain | 23 |
| 1976 | Wayne Evans | Grong Grong Matong | 32 | Bruce Stewart | Ardelthan | 26 |
| 1977 | Jim Prentice | Ariah Park-Mirrool | 26 | Keith Miller | Turvey Park | 21 |
| 1978 | Terry Haddrill | Ariah Park-Mirrool | 18 | Rod Lawry | Ardelthan | 17 |
| 1978 | Greg Leech | Ganmain | 18 | Rod Lawry | Ardelthan | 17 |
| 1978 | David Scott | Narrandra | 18 | Rod Lawry | Ardelthan | 17 |
| 1979 | Barry Nolan | Ganmain | 21 | Jim Prentice | Ariah Park - Mirrool | 17 |
| 1980 | Terry Haddrill | Ariah Park-Mirrool | ? | ? | ? | ? |
| 1981 | Grant Luhrs | Griffith | 20 | Alan Hayes | Turvey Park | 19 |
| Year | Winner | Club | Votes | Runner Up | Club | Votes |

== Leading Goalkicker ==
Seniors

Keisling Trophy Was donated by Mr. Ken Keisling, from E & K Keisling Jewellers, Narrandera.

| Year | Most Goals | Club | Goals | Finals Goals | Total Goals |
|---|---|---|---|---|---|
| 1953 | Clinton Wines | Ganmain | 100+ | | unofficial |
| 1958 | Kevin Gleeson | Ganmain | 92 | | unofficial |
| 1959 | Geoff Kingston | Turvey Park | 100+ | | unofficial |
| 1960 | Tom Carroll | Ganmain | 100+ | | unofficial |
| | Keisling Trophy | | | | |
| 1961 | Len Sexton | Griffith | 69 | 1 | 70 |
| 1962 | Len Sexton | Griffith | 57 | N/A | 57 |
| 1963 | Rex Burge | Turvey Park | 87 | 14 | 101 |
| 1964 | Tom Carroll | Ganmain | 86 | 16 | 102 |
| 1965 | Tom Carroll | Ganmain | 90 | 8 | 98 |
| 1966 | Kevin Fruend | Coolamon | 93 | 6 | 99 |
| 1967 | Des Lyons | Leeton | 67 | 5 | 72 |
| 1968 | Ron O'Neil | Griffith | 114 | 11 | 125 |
| 1969 | Ricky Quade | Ariah Park Mirrool | 131 | N/A | 131 |
| 1969 | Ron O'Neil | Griffith | 124 | 7 | 131 |
| 1970 | Jim Prentice | Ariah Park Mirrool | 91 | N/A | 91 |
| 1971 | Victor Hugo | Narrandera | 72 | N/A | 72 |
| 1972 | Phil Gehrig | Ganmain | 95 | N/A | 95 |
| 1973 | Grant Luhrs | Griffith | 78 | 5 | 83 |
| 1974 | B Harrison | Leeton | 76 | N/A | 76 |
| 1975 | Ralf Robins | Griffith | 92 | 4 | 96 |
| 1976 | Russell Campbell | Ganmain | 103 | 8 | 111 |
| 1977 | T Stirling | Ardlethan | 92 | N/A | 92 |
| 1978 | Mark Newton | Ariah Park Mirrool | 97 | N/A | 97 |
| 1979 | Mark Newton | Ariah Park Mirrool | 72 | 21 | 93 |
| 1980 | Greg Nichols | Turvey Park | 79 | 0 | 79 |
| 1981 | John Newton | Ariah Park Mirrool | 133 | 9 | 142 |

== Interleague Football Results ==
The Neville Nesbitt Trophy

Neville Nesbitt was the donor of a large trophy for interleague matches between the SWDFL and the Farrer Football League.

The SWDFL first played in the Victorian Country Football League inter-league competition in 1961 and in 1964, won the Victorian Country Football Champions, with SWDFL: 13.14 - 92 defeating the Hampden Football League: 9.16 - 70 in the grand final, played at Narrandera.

The SWDFL won the 1977 NSW Country Championships, defeating the Murray Football League in Sydney and the 1979 NSW Country Championships, defeating the Sydney Football League, which was played at Narrandera.

| Year | Captain | Coach | Venue | South West Score | Match Result | Opposition | Match Score | Gate | Notes |
|---|---|---|---|---|---|---|---|---|---|
| 1912 | | | Ganmain | | | Ariah Park FA | | | 24/8/12 |
| 1924 | | | Narrandera | 10.15 - 75 | lost to | Collingwood | 13.8 - 86 | | 16/7/24 |
| 1933 | L Hastie | | Narandera Park | 9.19 - 73 | lost to | Melbourne | 15.19 - 109 | £125 | 12/8/33 |
| 1934 | | | Leeton Cricket Ground | 6.11 - 47 | lost to | Hawthorn/Footscray | 20.15 - 135 | | 11.8.34 |
| 1934 | | | Lockhart, NSW | 25.28 - 178 | defeated | The Rock & DFL | 3.17 - 35 | | 25.8.34 |
| 1935 | | | | | | Ariah Park FA | | | |
| 1946 | | | Narrandera | 6.14 - 50 | lost to | Eastern Suburbs | 8.10 - 58 | | 8/6/46 |
| 1948 | Vic Woolnough | | Leeton | 11.17 - 83 | lost to | VFL | 23.19 - 153 | | 8/8/48 |
| 1950 | Keith Shea | | Trumper Park, Sydney | 15.22 - 112 | lost to | NSWANFL | 18.8 - 116 | | 11/6/50 |
| 1950 | Keith Shea | | Ganmain | 31.16 - 204 | defeated | Ariah Park FA | 12.9 - 81 | | 1/7/50 |
| 1951 | Jack Quinn | | Narrandera | 6.4 - 40 | lost to | VFL | 18.24 - 132 | £400 | 27/5/51 |
| 1952 | Laurie Carroll | | Leeton Showgrounds | 7.10 - 52 | lost to | O&MFL | 24.16 - 160 | £177 | 16/6/52 |
| 1954 | Erwin Dornau | | Bolton Park, Wagga | 10.7 - 67 | lost to | Albury & DFL | 12.20 - 92 | £524 | 19/6/54 |
| 1955 | | | Narrandera | 20.17 - 137 | defeated | Albury & DFL | 13.19 - 97 | | 19.6.55 |
| 1957 | Clinton Wines | | Narrandera | 12.8 - 80 | lost to | North Melbourne | 14.17 - 101 | £884 | 21/7/57 |
| 1959 | Alex Boyle | | Narrandera | 14.26 - 110 | defeated | Farrer FL | 13.10 - 88 | £1,044 | 21/6/59. Nesbitt Trophy |
| 1960 | | | Bolton Park, Wagga | 18.16 - 124 | defeated | Farrer FL | 12.16 - 88 | | 12/6/60. Nesbitt Trophy |
| 1960 | Jack Hudson | | Narrandera | 12.13 - 85 | lost to | Collingwood FC | 13.28 - 106 | £1,202 | 26/6/60 |
| 1961 | | | Narrandera | 12.16 - 88 | lost to | Geelong FC | 12.22 - 94 | £886 | 28/5/61 |
| 1961 | Peter Box | | Narrandera | 10.13 - 73 | lost to | O&MFL | 13.21 - 99 | £581 | 10/6/61. VCFL Country Championships |
| 1961 | | | Coolamon | 16.16 - 124 | lost to | Farrer FL | 19.28 - 142 | £760 | 16/7/61. Nesbitt Trophy |
| 1962 | Bernie Scully | | Bolton Park, Wagga | 22.14 - 146 | defeated | Farrer FL | 9.13 - 67 | | 20/5/62. Nesbitt Trophy |
| 1962 | Bernie Scully | | Trumper Park, Sydney | 16.15 - 113 | defeated | Sydney FL | 9.16 - 70 | | 3/6/62 |
| 1963 | Peter Box | Bernie Scully | Albury | 15.18 - 108 | defeated | O&MFL | 13.12 - 90 | £798 | 8/6/63. VCFL Country Championships Rd.1 |
| 1963 | Peter Box | Bernie Scully | Deakin Reserve, Shepparton | 10.14 - 74 | defeated | Waranga Nth Est FL | 9.4 - 58 | £614 | 10/6/63. VCFL Country Championships Rd.2. Zone Champions |
| 1963 | | Bernie Scully | Narrandera | 12.16 - 88 | lost to | Carlton | 18.19 - 127 | | 7/7/63 |
| 1963 | Peter Box | Bernie Scully | Narrandera | 9.20 - 74 | lost to | Farrer FL | 12.10 - 82 | £832 | 28/7/63. Nesbitt Trophy |
| 1964 | | | Wagga Wagga | 12.13 - 85 | defeated | Farrer FL | 7.13 - 55 | | 31/5/64. Nesbitt Trophy |
| 1964 | | | Narrandera | 18.16 - 124 | defeated | North Central FL | 10.16 - 76 | | 14/6/64. VCFL Country Championships Semi Final |
| 1964 | Ian Gillett | | Narrandera | 13.14 - 92 | defeated | Hampden FL | 9.16 - 70 | | 11/7/64. VCFL Country Championships Grand Final |
| 1965 | | | Narrandera | 20.12 - 132 | defeated | Farrer FL | 11.19 - 85 | | 23/5/65. Nesbitt Trophy |
| 1965 | | | Seymour | 14.14 - 98 | drew with | Waranga Nth Est FL | 13.20 - 98 | | 13/6/65. VCFL Country Championships Rd. 1 |
| 1965 | | | Shepparton | 17.19 - 121 | defeated | Waranga Nth Est FL | 8.13 - 61 | | 15/6/65. VCFL Country Championships Rd. 1 replay |
| 1965 | | | Albury | 9.11 - 65 | lost to | O&MFL | 13.11 - 89 | | 24/7/65. VCFL Country Championships Zone Final |
| 1966 | | | Yerong Creek | 12.21 - 93 | lost to | Farrer FL | 14.13 - 97 | | 29/5/66. Nesbitt Trophy |
| 1966 | | | Narrandera | 12.15 - 87 | lost to | Canberra ANFL | 21.17 - 143 | | 2/7/66 |
| 1967 | | | Ganmain | 7.16 - 58 | lost to | Farrer FL | 16.17 - 113 | | 21/5/67. Nesbitt Trophy |
| 1967 | | | Narrandera | 14.16 - 100 | lost to | Goulburn Valley FL | 14.20 - 104 | | 25/6/67. VCFL Country Championships Rd. 1 |
| 1968 | | | Yerong Creek | 21.12 - 138 | defeated | Farrer FL | 11.8 - 74 | | 9/6/68. Nesbitt Trophy |
| 1969 | | | Manuka Oval, Canberra | 7.20 - 62 | lost to | Canberra ANFL | 11.12 - 78 | | 1/6/69 |
| 1969 | | | Narrandera | 18.14 - 122 | defeated | Farrer FL No.1 | 14.11 - 95 | | 15/6/69. VCFL Country Championships Rd.1. Nesbitt Trophy. |
| 1969 | Barry Rist | | Narrandera | 18.19 - 127 | defeated | Farrer FL No.2 | 16.19 - 115 | | 15/6/69. |
| 1969 | Jim Hayes | | Albury Sportground | 10.14 - 74 | lost to | O&MFL | 19.22 - 136 | | 13/7/69. VCFL Country Championships Rd.2 |
| 1970 | | | Yerong Creek | 16.16 - 112 | lost to | Farrer FL | 19.21 - 135 | | 14/6/70. Nesbitt Trophy |
| 1970 | | | Narrandera | 5.17 - 107 | defeated | Canberra ANFL | 14.15 - 99 | | 5/7/70 |
| 1971 | | Warren Roper | Narrandera | 18.19 - 127 | defeated | Farrer FL | 11.13 - 79 | | 30/5/71. Nesbitt Trophy |
| 1971 | | Warren Roper | Swan Hill | 6.17 - 53 | lost to | Mid Murray FL | 11.18 - 74 | | 12/6/71. VCFL Country Championships Rd. 1 |
| 1972 | | | Yerong Creek | 10.13 - 73 | lost to | Farrer FL | 14.17 - 101 | | 28/5/72. Nesbitt Trophy |
| 1973 | | Jeff Hemphill | Manuka Oval, Canberra | 12.9 - 81 | lost to | Canberra NFL | 12.18 - 90 | | 20/5/73 |
| 1973 | | Jeff Hemphill | Narrandera | 15.8 - 98 | defeated | Farrer FL | 11.10 - 76 | | 10/6/73. VCFL Country Championships Rd. 1. Nesbitt Trophy |
| 1973 | | Jeff Hemphill | Corowa | 11.15 - 81 | lost to | O&MFL | 15.12 - 102 | | 22/7/73. VCFL Country Championships. Rd. 2. |
| 1974 | | | Robertson Oval, Wagga | 12.17 - 89 | lost to | Sydney FL | 15.13 - 103 | | 18/5/74. NSW Championships. Day 1 |
| 1974 | | | Robertson Oval, Wagga | 9.11 - 65 | lost to | Farrer FL | 17.23 - 125 | | 19/5/74. NSW Championships. Day 2 |
| 1974 | | | Yerong Creek | 15.17 - 107 | lost to | Farrer FL | 12.11 - 83 | | Nesbit Trophy. 16/6/74 |
| 1975 | Graham Miller | Graham Miller | Narrandera | 16.16 - 112 | defeated | Farrer FL | 11.14 - 80 | | 21/6/75. NSW Championships. Day 1. |
| 1975 | Graham Miller | Graham Miller | Narrandera | 18.21 - 128 | lost to | Sydney FL | 21.7 - 133 | | 22/6/75. NSW Championships. Day 2. G Final |
| 1976 | | Tom Carroll | Narrandera | 20.19 - 139 | defeated | Canberra ANFL | 10.13 - 73 | | 16/5/76 |
| 1976 | | Tom Carroll | Finley | 19.18 - 132 | defeated | Murray FL | 7.19 - 61 | $1381 | 26/6/76. NSW Championships. Day 1 |
| 1976 | | Tom Carroll | Finley | 14.12- 96 | lost to | Farrer FL | 16.15-111 | $1426 | 27/6/16. NSW Championships. Day 2. G Final |
| 1977 | Greg Leech | Tom Carroll | Ganmain | 13.14 - 92 | lost to | O&MFL | 15.19 - 109 | | 15/5/77. VCFL Country Championships. |
| 1977 | Greg Leech | Tom Carroll | Sydney Showgrounds | 15.25 - 115 | defeated | Sydney FL | 12.11 - 83 | | 11/6/77. NSW Championships. Day 1 |
| 1977 | Greg Leech | Tom Carroll | Sydney Showgrounds | 17.6 - 108 | defeated | Murray FL | 10.15 - 75 | | 12/6/77. NSW Championships. Day 2. G Final |
| 1978 | Greg Leech | Greg Leech | Martin Park, Wodonga | 11.10 - 76 | lost to | O&MFL | 18.26 - 134 | | 14/5/78. VCFL Championships. Rd. 1. |
| 1978 | Greg Leech | Greg Leech | Maher Oval, Wagga | 7.18 - 60 | lost to | Farrer FL | 14.9 - 93 | | 3/6/78. NSW Championships. Day 1 |
| 1978 | Greg Leech | Greg Leech | Maher Oval, Wagga | 18.12 - 120 | defeated | Sydney FL | 15.10 - 100 | | 4/6/78. NSW Championships. Day 2. 3rd |
| 1979 | Jim Prentice | Tom Carroll | Echuca | 14.14 - 98 | lost to | Goulburn Valley FL | 19.19 - 133 | | 20.5.79. VCFL Country Championships |
| 1979 | | Tom Carroll | Narrandera | 20.26 - 146 | defeated | Murray FL | 12.14 - 86 | | 2/6/79. NSW Championships. Day 1 |
| 1979 | | Tom Carroll | Narrandera | 28.17 - 185 | defeated | Sydney FL | 12.10 - 82 | | 3/5/79. NSW Championships. Day 2. G Final |
| 1980 | John Chamberlain | Phil Gehrig | Narrandra | 17.15 - 117 | lost to | Bendigo FL | 22.20 - 152 | $2,100 | 18/5/80. VCFL Country Championships |
| 1980 | | Phil Gehrig | Deniliquin, NSW | 11.9 - 75 | lost to | Sydney FL | 18.9 - 118 | | 7/6/80. NSW Championships. Day 1 |
| 1980 | | Phil Gehrig | Deniliquin, NSW | 12.8 - 80 | lost to | Murray FL | 16.15 - 111 | | 8/6/80. NSW Championships. Day 2. 4th |
| 1981 | Alan Hayes | Alan Hayes | Albury Sportsground | 14.19 - 103 | lost to | O&MFL | 19.11 - 125 | | 10/5/81. VCFL Championships |

== VFL Players ==
The following SWDFL footballers went onto play senior VFL football with the following clubs, with the year indicating their VFL debut -

- 1925 - Joseph Plant - Narrandera to Richmond
- 1925 - Les Stainsby - Coolamon to Collingwood
- 1928 - Jack Haw - Leeton to Melbourne
- 1931 - Geoff Neil - Leeton to St. Kilda
- 1933 - George Schlitz - Leeton to St. Kilda
- 1934 - George Pattison - Narrandera to Essendon
- 1936 - Percy Bushby - Narrandrea to Essendon
- 1948 - Laurie Carroll - Ganmain to St. Kilda
- 1948 - Dudley Mattingly - Ganmain to St. Kilda
- 1955 - Peter Curtis - Coolamon, Griffith to North Melbourne
- 1957 - Tom Quade - Ariah Park Mirrool to North Melbourne
- 1958 - Bill Box - Whitton to Essendon
- 1960 - Des Lyons - Leeton to Carlton
- 1961 - Jim Carroll - Ganmain to Carlton
- 1961 - Tom Carroll - Ganmain to Carlton
- 1966 - Mike Quade - Ariah Park Mirrool to North Melbourne
- 1968 - Ross Elwin - Leeton to South Melbourne
- 1968 - Bruce Reid - Leeton to South Melbourne
- 1970 - Frank Gumbleton - Ganmain to North Melbourne
- 1970 - Ricky Quade - Ariah Park Mirrool to South Melbourne
- 1971 - Jim Prentice - Ariah Park Mirrool to South Melbourne
- 1975 - Rod Coelli - Ardlethan to South Melbourne
- 1975 - Terry O'Neil - Narrandera to South Melbourne
- 1976 - Terry Daniher - Ariah Park - Mirrool to South Melbourne
- 1977 - Wayne Evans - Grong Grong Matong to South Melbourne
- 1978 - Russell Campbell - Gainmain to South Melbourne
- 1979 - Wayne Carroll - Ganmain to South Melbourne
- 1979 - John Durnan - Narrandera to Geelong
- 1979 - Mark Fraser - Turvey Park to South Melbourne
- 1979 - Max Kruse - Leeton to South Melbourne
- 1980 - Stephen Eather - Turvey Park to South Melbourne
- 1980 - Victor Hugo - Narrandera to South Melbourne
- 1980 - Greg Smith - Ardlethan to South Melbourne
- 1981 - Dennis Carroll - Ganmain to South Melbourne
- 1981 - Anthony Daniher - Turvey Park to South Melbourne
- 1981 - Jack Lucas - Ariah Park - Mirrool to South Melbourne

The following senior VFL players came to play and or coach in the SWDFL, with the year indicating their first season in the SWDFL.

- 1914 - Charles Pickerd - St. Kilda to Narrandera
- 1923 - Jock Doherty - St. Kilda to Ganmain
- 1934 - Maurie Mahony - Hawthorn to Coolamon
- 1934 - Leo Nolan - Melbourne to Leeton
- 1934 - Keith Parris - Essendon to Narrandera
- 1935 - Jerry McAuliffe - Hawthorn to Leeton
- 1937 - Roy McEachen - South Melbourne to Narrandera
- 1940 - Norm Le Brun - Essendon to Ganmain
- 1947 - Jim Hallahan - Fitzroy to Coolamon
- 1947 - Les Meek - St. Kilda to Ganmain
- 1947 - Geoff Willis - North Melbourne to Griffith
- 1948 - Tom Bush - Melbourne to Coolamon
- 1948 - Les Main - Collingwood to Leeton
- 1949 - Kevin Kallady - St. Kilda to Narrandera
- 1950 - Frank Bourke - Richmond to Ganmain
- 1950 - George Bennett - Hawthorn to Matong
- 1950 - Keith Shea - Carlton to Griffith
- 1950 - Tom Spear - Hawthorn to Matong
- 1951 - Laurie Taylor - Richmond to Coolamon
- 1952 - Clinton Wines - Carlton to Ganmain
- 1952 - Tom Roulent - South Melbourne to Griffith
- 1953 - Dean Chapman - St. Kilda to Coolamon
- 1953 - Erwin Dornau - South Melbourne to Leeton
- 1956 - Mick Grambeau - North Melbourne to Ganmain
- 1956 - Neale Rutzou - Fitzroy to Coolamon
- 1957 - Tom Allen - Richmond to Griffith
- 1958 - Kevin Gleeson - Richmond to Ganmain
- 1959 - Peter Box - Footscray to Grong Grong Matong
- 1959 - Fred Gallagher - Essendon to Turvey Park
- 1959 - Ian Gillett - South Melbourne to Coolamon
- 1959 - Don Keyter - South Melbourne to Griffith
- 1960 - Bill Byrne - Melbourne to Leeton
- 1962 - Gerald Eastmure - North Melbourne to Leeton
- 1963 - Fred Mundy - Richmond to Griffith
- 1964 - Bill Evely - Richmond to Whitton
- 1964 - Peter Morris - Richmond to Griffith
- 1964 - Peter Weidemann - Collingwood to Coolamon
- 1965 - Noel Anderson - Richmond to Whitton
- 1965 - Barry Connolly - Footscray to Ardlethan
- 1965 - Ray Dawson - Melbourne to Leeton
- 1965 - Jim Gutterson - Footscray to Turvey Park
- 1965 - Kevin Kirkpatrick - Geelong to Griffith
- 1965 - Barry Rist - Collingwood to Ariah Park - Mirrool
- 1965 - Bill Thripp - Collingwood to Ardlethan
- 1966 - Frank Hodgkin - St. Kilda to Ganmain
- 1967 - Ron Harvey - Fitzroy to Coolamon
- 1968 - Vern Drake - Fitzroy to Ariah Park - Mirrool
- 1968 - Barney McKellar - Footscray to Coolamon
- 1969 - Graham Ion - Footscray to Turvey Park
- 1970 - Doug Priest - South Melbourne to Ariah Park - Mirrool
- 1970 - Warren Roper - Collingwood to Narrandera
- 1971 - Kevin Delmenico - Footscray to Ganmain
- 1972 - Phil Gehrig - Footscray to Ganmain
- 1976 - Keith Miller - Geelong to Turvey Park
- 1979 - Harry Skreja - Footscray to Leeton
- 1980 - Kevin Grose - Collingwood to Ardlethan
- 1981 - Brian Symes - North Melbourne to Ganmain

South Australian National Football League

- 1961 - Geoff Kingston - Turvey Park to West Torrens

== Officer Bearers ==
| Year | President | Secretary | Treasurer | Notes |
|---|---|---|---|---|
| | Ganmain & DFA | | | |
| 1910 | | | | |
| 1911 | | | | |
| 1912 | | | | |
| | South West District FL | | | |
| 1913 | R B Burns | D J Thompson | | |
| 1914 | R D Burns | | | |
| 1915 | | | | SWDFA in recess > WW1 |
| 1916 | | | | SWDFA in recess > WW1 |
| 1917 | | | | SWDFA in recess > WW1 |
| 1918 | SWDFA in recess | | | Coolamon & DFA formed |
| 1919 | W Guest | L Henshaw | E C Podmore | |
| | | W Anderson | | W Anderson, Dec'19 |
| 1920 | W Guest | W Anderson | J Kennedy | |
| 1921 | W C H Hardingham | D K Frew | | |
| 1922 | F D Inman | W F Inman | J C Little | |
| 1923 | L Cameron | G G Miller | J C Little | |
| 1924 | W Nulty | W C H Hardingham | J C Little | |
| 1925 | W Nulty | W C H Hardingham | J C Little | |
| 1926 | John Wise | | | |
| 1927 | J A Alexander | George Hepburn | J C Little | |
| 1928 | J W Ford | George Hepburn | J C Little | |
| 1929 | J Carroll | C Jack Smith | R Richardson | |
| 1930 | J Carroll | C Jack Smith | R Richardson | SWDFL in recess |
| 1931 | T H Mancy | C Jack Smith | K A Edwards | |
| 1932 | Leo Smith | C Jack Smith | Len Wilkinson | |
| 1933 | | | | |
| 1934 | | | | |
| 1935 | Maloney | C Jack Smith | | |
| 1936 | | | | |
| 1937 | | | | SWDFL in recess |
| 1938 | H Breaden | C Jack Smith | | SWDFL in recess |
| 1939 | W J T Morgan | C Jack Smith | George V Stevens | |
| 1940 | W J T Morgan | C Jack Smith | George V Stevens | |
| 1941-45 | | | | SWDFL in recess>WW2 |
| 1945 | G Hinchcliffe | C Jack Smith | George V Stevens | |
| 1946 | W Harry Logan | C Jack Smith | George V Stevens | |
| 1948 | W Miles | H Doug Roach | William J Gammage | |
| 1949 | W Miles | H Doug Roach | William J Gammage | |
| 1950 | Jim Quinn | H Doug Roach | William J Gammage | |
| 1951 | Jim Quinn | H Doug Roach | William J Gammage | |
| 1952 | Jim Quinn | H Doug Roach | William J Gammage | |
| 1953 | Jim Quinn | H Doug Roach | William J Gammage | |
| 1954 | Jim Quinn | H Doug Roach | William J Gammage | |
| 1955 | Jim Quinn | H Doug Roach | William J Gammage | |
| 1956 | Jim Quinn | H Doug Roach | William J Gammage | |
| 1957 | Jim Quinn | A F Elrington | William J Gammage | |
| 1958 | Jim Quinn | | | |
| 1959 | Jim Quinn | | | |
| 1960 | Jim Quinn | F H Bratton | K Taylor | |
| 1961 | Jim Quinn | F H Bratton | H W McKinnon | |
| 1962 | Jim Quinn | F H Bratton | H W McKinnon | |
| 1963 | Jim Quinn | F H Bratton | H G Brett | |
| 1964 | Jim Quinn | Harvey G Brett | C Suttie | |
| 1965 | Jim Quinn | Harvey G Brett | R J Biggs | |
| 1966 | Jim Quinn | Harvey G Brett | R J Biggs | |
| 1967 | Jim Quinn | Harvey G Brett | Peter J Wilson | |
| 1968 | Jim Quinn | N Jack Buchanan | Ron Alston | |
| 1969 | Jim Quinn | N Jack Buchanan | V Vic Woolnough | |
| 1970 | Jim Quinn | N Jack Buchanan | V Vic Woolnough | |
| 1971 | Jim Quinn | N Jack Buchanan | V Vic Woolnough | |
| 1972 | Jim Quinn | N Jack Buchanan | V Vic Woolnough | |
| 1973 | Jim Quinn | N Jack Buchanan | V Vic Woolnough | |
| 1974 | Jim Quinn | N Jack Buchanan | V Vic Woolnough | |
| 1975 | Jim Quinn | N Jack Buchanan | V Vic Woolnough | |
| 1976 | Jim Quinn | N Jack Buchanan | V Vic Woolnough | Quinn resigned in April '76 |
| 1976 | J Frank Gaynor | N Jack Buchanan | V Vic Woolnough | Gaynor appointed in May '76 |
| 1977 | J Frank Gaynor | N Jack Buchanan | V Vic Woolnough | |
| 1978 | J Frank Gaynor | N Jack Buchanan | V Vic Woolnough | |
| 1979 | J Frank Gaynor | N Jack Buchanan | V Vic Woolnough | |
| 1980 | J Frank Gaynor | N Jack Buchanan | V Vic Woolnough | |
| 1981 | J Frank Gaynor | John E Trigg | V Vic Woolnough | |

== Life Members ==
- 1972 - Jim Quinn

== Links ==
- History of South West District Football League
- "Swans on Screen": Griffith FNC - Detailed & comprehensive club & SWDFL league history
- AFL Victoria Country
- Australian rules football in New South Wales
- Albury & District Football League
- Central Hume Football Association
- Central Riverina Football League
- Central Riverina FL - "CRFL Weekly Record"
- Coreen & District Football League
- Farrer Football League
- Hume Football Netball League
- Northern Riverina Football League
- Riverina Football Association
- Riverina Football Netball League
- 1928 - South West DFL Premiers: Narrandera FC team photo
- 1948 - South West DFL Premiers: Narrandera FC team photo
- 1962 - South West DFL Premiers: Ariah Park FC team photo
- 1964 - Victorian Country Football Champions: SWDFL Representative team photo
- 1966 - South West DFL Premiers: Narrandera FC team photo
- 1974 - South West DFL Premiers: Narrandera FC team photo
