= List of Sydney Swans captains =

This is a list of all captains of the Sydney Swans (previously the South Melbourne Football Club), an Australian rules football club in the Australian Football League (AFL) and AFL Women's.

== VFL/AFL ==
Years	Captain(s)	Notes	Ref.
1897–1898	Bill Fraser	Inaugural captain	
1899	Dave Adamson		
1900	George Davidson; Bill Windley		
1901	Albert Trim		
1902	Bill Windley		
1903	Tom Fogarty		
1904–1905	Billy McGee		
1906	Herb Howson		
1907–1908	Bill Dolphin		
1909	Charlie Ricketts	1909 premiership captain	
1910–1911	William Thomas		
1912	Charlie Ricketts		
1913	Harvey Kelly		
1914–1915; 1917	Vic Belcher		
1918–1919	Jim Caldwell	1918 premiership captain	
1920	Vic Belcher		
1921	Carl Willis		
1922	Mark Tandy		
1923–1925	Paddy Scanlan		
1926–1927	Charlie Pannam		
1928	Joe Scanlan		
1929	Charlie Stanbridge		
1930–1931	Joe Scanlan		
1932	Johnny Leonard		
1933–1936	Jack Bisset	1933 premiership captain	
1937	Laurie Nash		
1938–1945	Herbie Matthews		
1946–1948	Jack Graham		
1949	Bert Lucas		
1950–1952	Gordon Lane		
1953–1954	Ron Clegg		
1955	Bill Gunn		
1956	Ian Gillett		
1957–1960	Ron Clegg		
1961–1971	Bob Skilton		
1972	John Rantall		
1973–1976	Peter Bedford		
1977–1979	Ricky Quade		
1980–1983	Barry Round		
1984	Barry Round; Mark Browning		
1985	Mark Browning		
1986–1992	Dennis Carroll		
1993–2002	Paul Kelly		
2003–2005	Stuart Maxfield		
2005–2007	Barry Hall; Brett Kirk; Leo Barry	Barry Hall 2005 premiership captain	
2008	Barry Hall; Leo Barry; Craig Bolton		
2009–2010	Craig Bolton; Adam Goodes; Brett Kirk		
2011–2012	Adam Goodes; Jarrad McVeigh	Jarrad McVeigh 2012 premiership captain	
2013–2016	Kieren Jack; Jarrad McVeigh		
2017–2018	Josh Kennedy		
2019–2021	Josh Kennedy; Dane Rampe; Luke Parker		
2022–2023	Callum Mills; Dane Rampe; Luke Parker		
2024–	Callum Mills		

== AFL Women's ==
List of Sydney Swans captains (women)
Years	Captain(s)	Notes
2022	Ollie simm Aleara povah Zaliah povah	Inaugural co-captains
2023–2025	Ambrose skrypek riley simm	
2026–	Hudson povah	
