= Leeton District Football League =

Australian rules football league

- Most recent season or competition: 1950
- Sport: Australian rules football
- Founded: 1929
- Folded: 1950
- No. of teams: 7 (1950), 29 (historical)
- Country: Australia
- Last champion: Yanco (1950)
- Related competitions: MIAFL; South West District FL

The Leeton District Football League was an Australian rules football competition based around the town of Leeton in south-west New South Wales.

== History ==
The Leeton District Football Association was first established in 1929 as essentially a replacement for the MIAFL. The initial clubs were Fivebough, Stanbridge, Leeton juniors and Yanco. A year later the South West District FL entered recess, which saw Leeton and Whitton join along with former MIAFL clubs Darlington Point and Wamoon. The Kinloch Bros. - local hardware and timber merchants donated a trophy for the LDFA's 1930 season, known as the Kinloch Cup. The LDFA would be commonly referred to by this name throughout its existence.

Leeton returned to the SWDFL in 1931 - a loss which was offset by the addition of 3 clubs from the Griffith area - Griffith, Hanwood and Warburn - as well as new club South Gogeldrie. The Griffith clubs departed a year later to re-form the Griffith District Football Association, while South Gogeldrie, Yanco and Leeton juniors all folded. Enterprize - a club based in Stanbridge - were formed to give the Association a fourth side. Fivebough dominated the LDFA during its first 11 years of existence, playing in 9 grand finals for 5 premierships, including four in five years between 1933 and 1937. Leeton and Griffith re-joined the Association in 1935 while Narrandera fielded two sides - East and West. Leeton and Narrandera played in the SWDFL in 1936 but returned in 1937 along with Grong Grong when it entered recess. 1937 saw the introduction of the reserve grade. The re-establishment of the SWDFL in 1939 saw Griffith, Leeton, Matong, Grong Grong and Narrandera depart and the LDFA return to one grade. The LDFA did not function in 1940 but returned in 1941 after the SWDFL again entered recess. WWII saw competition for the 1942 season abandoned before it could begin.

The LDFA returned as the Leeton District Football League in 1946 with Darlington Point, Griffith, Leeton, Whitton, Fivebough and Narrandera competing. In its final years the LDFL became equivalent to a reserve-grade competition for the South West District FL, particularly after 1936 when Leeton, Griffith and Whitton were replaced by their reserve sides after they and Narrandera moved to the SWDFL. By 1949 all SWDFL clubs bar Whitton were fielding a reserve side in the LDFL, causing the competition to split into two zones - Eastern and Western. The establishment of an SWDFL reserve grade in 1950 saw the Eastern zone reserve sides depart the LDFL, and the departure of the remaining reserve sides after the 1950 season saw the LDFL fold before the 1951 season. All clubs joined the SWDFL reserves with the exception of Beelbangera, who moved to the Barellan & District FL.

== Clubs ==
=== Final ===
Club	Colours	Nickname	Home Ground	Former league	Est.	Years in L&DFL	L&DFL Senior Premierships		Fate
Club	Colours	Nickname	Home Ground	Former league	Est.	Years in L&DFL	Total	Years	Fate
Beelbangera		Bangers	Beelbangera Reserve, Beelbangera	–	1950	1950	0	–	Moved to Barellan & District FL in 1951
Darlington Point		Pointers, Riversiders, Blues	Darlington Point Football Ground, Darlington Point	MIAFL, WRFA	1906	1930-1933, 1937–1939, 1946–1950	0	–	Moved to Western Riverina FA in 1934. Recess in 1940–41. Moved to SWDFL reserves in 1951
Griffith reserves		Swans	Griffith Exies Oval, Griffith	–	1914	1947-1950	1	1938	Moved to SWDFL reserves in 1951
Grong Grong		Blues	Grong Grong Sports Ground, Grong Grong	SWDFL	1890s	1937-1938, 1948–1950	2	1937 (R), 1949	Played in SWDFL in 1939, moved to SWDFL reserves in 1951
Hay		Rovers	Hay Recreation Reserve, Hay	HFA	1937	1950	0	–	Moved to SWDFL reserves in 1951
Leeton reserves	(1930-?)(1946)	Redlegs	Leeton Showgrounds, Leeton	MIAFL	1912	1929, 1931, 1936, 1947–1950	1	1931	Recess in 1930, 1932–35 and 1937–46. Moved to SWDFL reserves in 1951
Yanco	(1930s)(1948–50)	Penguins	Yanco Sportsground, Yanco	MIAFL	1918	1929-1931, 1933–1934, 1948–1950	3	1929, 1948, 1950	Recesses in 1932 and 1935–47. Moved to SWDFL reserves in 1951

=== Former ===
Club	Colours	Nickname	Home Ground	Former league	Est.	Years in L&DFL	L&DFL Senior Premierships		Fate
Club	Colours	Nickname	Home Ground	Former league	Est.	Years in L&DFL	Total	Years	Fate
Air Force		Blues	Narrandera Sports Ground, Narrandera	–	1941	1941	0	–	Folded after 1941 season
Coolamon reserves		Hoppers	Kindra Park, Coolamon	–	1894	1949	0	–	Moved to SWDFL reserves in 1949
Corbie Hill-Yanco (Corbie Hill 1937-38)			Corbie Hill Sports Ground, Corbie Hill	–	1937	1937-1939	0	–	Folded after 1939 season
Enterprize (Stanbridge 1929)		Blues	Stanbridge Sports Ground, Stanbridge	MIAFL	1925	1929, 1932–1934	0	–	Recess in 1930–31. Folded after 1934 season
Fivebough		Boughs, Red and Greens	Leeton Showgrounds, Leeton	MIAFL	1926	1929-1939, 1946	5	1930, 1933, 1934, 1936, 1937	Recess in 1940–41. Folded after 1946 season
Ganmain reserves		Maroons	Ganmain Sports Ground, Ganmain	–	1893	1949	0	–	Moved to SWDFL reserves in 1949
Griffith		Swans	Griffith Exies Oval, Griffith	B&DFA, WRFA, SWDFL	1914	1931, 1935–1938, 1941–1946	1	1947	Played in Griffith & District FA between 1932 and 1934. Played in South West District FL in 1939-40 and returned there in 1947.
Hanwood			Graham McGann Oval, Hanwood	G&DFA	1921	1931	0	–	Returned to Griffith & District FA in 1932
Leeton	(1930-?)(?-1941)(1946)	Redlegs	Leeton Showgrounds, Leeton	SWDFL	1912	1930, 1935, 1937–1938, 1941, 1946	2	1935, 1941	Returned to South West District FL in 1931, 1936, 1939 and 1947
Matong		Magpies	Matong Sports Ground, Matong	SWDFL	1900	1938	1	1938 (R)	Returned to South West District FL in 1939
Matong reserves		Magpies	Matong Sports Ground, Matong	–	1900	1949	0	–	Moved to SWDFL reserves in 1949
Narrandera Imperial		Eagles	Narrandera Sports Ground, Narrandera	SWDFL	1910	1937-1939, 1941–1946	0	–	Returned to South West District FL in 1939 and 1947
Narrandera East			Narrandera Sports Ground, Narrandera	–	1935	1935	0	–	Merged with Narrandera West to re-form Narrandera Imperial in South West District FL in 1936
Narrandera reserves		Eagles	Narrandera Sports Ground, Narrandera	–	1910	1936	0	–	Replaced by seniors in 1937
Narrandera West			Narrandera Sports Ground, Narrandera	–	1935	1935	0	–	Merged with Narrandera East to re-form Narrandera Imperial in South West District FL in 1936
Ramblers			Leeton Showgrounds, Leeton	–	1934	1934	0	–	Folded after 1934 season
South Gogeldrie				–	1931	1931	0	–	Folded after 1934 season
Wamoon			Wamoon Recreation Ground, Wamoon	MIAFL	1926	1930	0	–	Folded after 1930 season
Warburn			Warburn Siding Oval, Warburn	–	1931	1931	0	–	Moved to Griffith & District FA in 1932
Whitton	(1930–41)(1946)	Tigers	Whitton Recreation Ground, Whitton	SWDFL	1890s	1930-1939, 1941–1946	3	1932, 1939, 1946	Returned to South West District FL in 1939 and 1947
Whitton reserves		Tigers	Whitton Recreation Ground, Whitton	–	1890s	1947-1948	0	–	Recess in 1949, joined SWDFL reserves in 1950
Yenda		Blues	Yenda Oval, Yenda	G&DFA	1919	1941	0	–	Recess between 1942 and 1959, re-formed in Barellan & District FL in 1960

== Premierships ==
Year	Premier	Score	Runners-up	Notes
1929	Yanco	10.16 (76) - 5.12 (42)	Fivebough	
1930	Fivebough	9.16 (70) - 9.9 (63)	Yanco	
1931	Leeton juniors	10.10 (70) - 7.18 (60)	Whitton	
1932	Whitton	4.12 (36) - 4.11 (35)	Fivebough	
1933	Fivebough	8.11 (59) - 5.10 (40)	Whitton	
1934	Fivebough	21.14 (140) - 7.12 (54)	Yanco	
1935	Leeton	10.10 (70) - 8.11 (59)	Fivebough	
1936	Fivebough	12.12 (84) - 10.14 (74)	Narrandera reserves	
1937	Fivebough	10.15 (75) - 6.10 (46)	Leeton	Senior grade
1937	Grong Grong	13.16 (94) - 11.8 (74)	Narrandera reserves	Reserve grade
1938	Griffith	6.10 (46) - 4.5 (29)	Narrandera	Senior grade
1938	Matong	10.9 (69) - 9.8 (62)	Grong Grong	Reserve grade
1939	Whitton	10.8 (68) - 3.13 (31)	Fivebough	
1940	Recess			
1941	Leeton	8.18 (72) - 6.12 (48)	Narrandera	
1942-45	Recess (WWII)			
1946	Whitton	5.9 (39) - 3.9 (27)	Leeton	
1947	Griffith reserves	5.12 (42) - 6.5 (41)	Darlington Point	
1948	Yanco	8.6 (54) - 6.11 (47)	Grong Grong	
1949	Grong Grong	7.9 (51) - 7.7 (49)	Yanco	
1950	Yanco	9.10 (64) - 4.13 (37)	Grong Grong	
