= Les Meek =

Australian rules footballer (1918–1971)

Personal information
- Full name: Leslie John Meek
- Born: 21 July 1918; Ballarat, Victoria
- Died: 5 May 1971 (aged 52); Ganmain, New South Wales
- Original team: Ararat
- Height: 177 cm (5 ft 10 in)
- Weight: 81 kg (179 lb)

Playing career^{1}
Years	Club	Games (Goals)
1941–1947	St Kilda	49 (11)
- ^{1} Playing statistics correct to the end of 1947.

Leslie John "Les" Meek (21 July 1918 – 5 May 1971) was an Australian rules footballer who played with St Kilda in the Victorian Football League (VFL).

== Biography ==
Meek, who was born in Ballarat, came down from Ararat to play for St Kilda.

He was selected for the opening round of the 1941 VFL season on the back of a nine-goal haul in a practise game, but played most of his football at St Kilda across half-back. In round two he appeared in the first ever VFL game held at Kardinia Park.

His VFL career was interrupted by war service, while he played 37 games from 1941 to 1943, he missed the entire 1944 and 1945 seasons. He returned in 1946 and made 11 appearances, although he had to sit out eight weeks through suspension, for kicking Melbourne player Jack Mueller in round nine.

In 1947 he played in only one game before leaving early in the season for New South Wales, as the new playing coach of Ganmain. He coached Ganmain to back to back South West Football League (New South Wales) premierships in 1948 and 1949.
