= Warren Roper =

Warren Roper may refer to:

- Warren Roper (chemist) (born 1938), New Zealand chemist
- Warren Roper (footballer) (born 1940), Australian rules footballer
