= Ricky Quade =

Australian rules footballer and coach

Personal information
- Full name: Richard Paul Quade
- Born: 26 August 1950 (age 76); Narrandera, New South Wales
- Original team: Ariah Park-Mirrool
- Height: 185 cm (6 ft 1 in)
- Weight: 88 kg (194 lb)
- Position: Ruck-rover

Playing career^{1}
Years	Club	Games (Goals)
1970-1980	South Melbourne	164 (110)

Coaching career
Years	Club	Games (W–L–D)
1982–1984	Sydney Swans	57 (25–32–0)
- ^{1} Playing statistics correct to the end of 1980.

Career highlights
- South Melbourne best and fairest 1976; South Melbourne captain 1977-1979

Ricky Quade (born 26 August 1950) is a former Australian rules footballer who represented South Melbourne in the Victorian Football League (VFL). Quade later became better known as the inaugural coach of the Sydney Swans when South Melbourne relocated to the Harbour City in 1982 and also served the club in various administrative roles.

Quade originally supported North Melbourne, the club that his older brothers Tom and Mike played for. With the advent of zoned country recruitment in late 1967, Quade joined South Melbourne from Ariah Park – Mirool, New South Wales in 1970 after kicking 131 goals in the South West Football League (New South Wales) and finishing third in the SWDFL senior best and fairest medal, the Gammage Medal, in 1969.

In 1975, Quade played the first three rounds with South Melbourne then Quade and teammate Jim Prentice both returned to Ariah Park – Mirrool as coach and assistant coach, with the team losing the preliminary final and Prentice winning the SWDFL Gammage Medal.

Quade returned to South Melbourne and won the best and fairest award in 1976 and captained the club from 1977 to 1979, playing mainly as a ruck rover.

When South Melbourne relocated to Sydney in 1982 Quade was their inaugural coach and remained there until thirteen rounds into the 1984 season when a severely bleeding ulcer caused him to resign. Quade had already considered it likely he would resign at the end of 1984.
