= Kalladi =

Kalladi or Kallady may refer to:

- Kalladi (or Kallady) is a sub-caste within the Scheduled Castes (Dalits), primarily found in the Indian state of Kerala, with smaller populations in Karnataka and Tamil Nadu. Traditionally, members of the Kalladi community have been engaged in occupations such as agricultural labour and animal husbandry. They predominantly speak Malayalam and adhere to Hinduism. Like many Dalit communities in India, the Kalladi continue to face social and economic marginalisation despite constitutional safeguards aimed at promoting equality and social justice. In Kerala, they are classified among the most vulnerable Scheduled Castes, experiencing persistent socio-economic and educational disadvantages, even though they are included in various state welfare schemes. According to the 2011 Census of India, the Kalladi community is most populous in the state of Kerala, with Malappuram district recording 27,115 individuals and Kozhikode district with 11,199. In Karnataka, the community is concentrated in the Chikmagalur district, which reported a population of 1,552. In Tamil Nadu, the Kalladi population is minimal, with Viluppuram district recording 273 individuals.
- Kalladi (Batticaloa), a village in Batticaloa District, Sri Lanka
- Kalladi (Jaffna), a village in Northern Province, Sri Lanka
- Kallady Bridge, Batticaloa District, Sri Lanka
- Kevin Kallady (1923–2008), Australian rules footballer

== See also ==
- Kalady, a village in Kerala, India
