= Joe Scanlan =

Joe Scanlan may refer to:

- Joe Scanlan (footballer)
- Joe Scanlan (artist)

== See also ==
- Joseph L. Scanlan, American film and television director
