= Lauren Szigeti =

Personal information
- Born: 28 February 2000 (age 26)
- Original teams: Darebin Falcons (VFLW); Box Hill Hawks (VFLW)
- Debut: Round 1, 2022 (S7), Sydney vs. St Kilda, at North Sydney Oval
- Height: 162 cm (5 ft 4 in)
- Position: Midfielder

Playing career
Years	Club	Games (Goals)
2022 (S7)–2024	Sydney	20 (0)

Career highlights
- Sydney co-captain: 2022 (S7)

Lauren Szigeti (born 30 March 2004) is a former professional Australian rules footballer who played for the Sydney Swans in the AFL Women's (AFLW).

== VFLW career ==
Szigeti played VFLW for the Darebin Falcons. In 2021, Szigeti switched clubs to the Box Hill Hawks.

== AFLW career ==
Szigeti signed with the Sydney Swans ahead of 2022 AFL Women's season 7, the club's inaugural AFLW season. She was named as co-captain of the Swans alongside Maddy Collier and Brooke Lochland. She made her debut in round 1 of 2022 AFL Women's season 7. Szigeti would go on to play all 10 games of season 7, finishing sixth in the Swans' best and fairest.

At the end of the 2024 AFLW season, Szigeti was delisted by the Swans. She joined the Collingwood Football Club in the VFLW for the 2025 VFLW season.
