= Jack Lucas =

Jack Lucas may refer to:

- Jacklyn H. Lucas (1928–2008), American Marine awarded the Medal of Honor at age 17
- Jack Lucas (footballer) (born 1961), Australian rules footballer for the Sydney Swans
