= Ross Elwin =

Australian rules footballer

Personal information
- Full name: Ross Elwin
- Born: 4 July 1946 (age 80); Melbourne, Victoria, Australia
- Original teams: Leeton, South West Football League (New South Wales)
- Height: 191 cm (6 ft 3 in)
- Weight: 93 kg (205 lb)

Playing career^{1}
Years	Club	Games (Goals)
1968, 1970	South Melbourne	10 (6)
- ^{1} Playing statistics correct to the end of 1970.

Ross Elwin (born 4 July 1946) is a former Australian rules footballer who played with South Melbourne in the Victorian Football League (VFL).
