= Maurie Mahony =

Australian rules footballer (1906–2000)

Personal information
- Full name: Maurice Charles Leo Mahony
- Born: 16 October 1906; St Kilda, Victoria
- Died: 31 August 2000 (aged 93)
- Original team: Elsternwick

Playing career^{1}
Years	Club	Games (Goals)
1929	Hawthorn	10 (3)
- ^{1} Playing statistics correct to the end of 1929.

Maurie Mahony (16 October 1906 – 31 August 2000) was an Australian rules footballer who played with Hawthorn in the Victorian Football League (VFL).

In 1930, Mahony was appointed as captain-coach of the Hamilton Football Club and lead them to the premiership of the Western District Football Association, kicking eight goals in the grand final and he also kicked 90 goals for the year.

Mahony coached Myrtleford Football Club in 1933, in which they lost the Ovens & King Football League grand final to Moyhu.

Mahony was captain-coach of the Coolamon Football Club in the South West Football League (New South Wales) in 1934 and shared the league best and fairest award.
