= Tom Roulent =

Australian rules footballer, born 1918

Personal information
- Full name: Thomas Joseph Roulent
- Born: 10 February 1918; West Melbourne, Victoria
- Died: 25 March 2005 (aged 87)
- Original team: North Melbourne CYMS (CYMSFA)
- Height: 180 cm (5 ft 11 in)
- Weight: 90 kg (198 lb)
- Position: Defence

Playing career^{1}
Years	Club	Games (Goals)
1939–40, 1944–45	North Melbourne	77 (17)
1946–47	South Melbourne	29 (16)
Total		106 (33)
- ^{1} Playing statistics correct to the end of 1947.

Thomas Joseph Roulent (10 February 1918 – 25 March 2005) was an Australian rules footballer who played with North Melbourne and South Melbourne in the Victorian Football League (VFL).

Roulent's career with North Melbourne was interrupted by his service in the Australian Army during World War II. In 1946 he moved to South Melbourne.

In June 1947, Roulent was appointed as coach of Border United in Corowa, NSW that played in the Ovens and Murray Football League but South Melbourne refused to clear Roulent and he played out the 1947 VFL season at the Lakeside Oval.

Roulent was appointed as coach of the Jeparit Football Club from 1948 and he continued coached them through 1950.

Roulent was captain-coach of Griffith Football Club from 1952 to 1954 and coached them to the 1952 South West Football League (New South Wales) premiership.

Roulet's grandfather, Steven Roulet, captained North Melbourne in the 1890s.
