= Gerald Eastmure (footballer) =

Australian rules footballer

Personal information
- Full name: Gerald Eastmure
- Born: 20 February 1935 (age 91)
- Original team: North Colts
- Height: 177 cm (5 ft 10 in)
- Weight: 76 kg (168 lb)

Playing career^{1}
Years	Club	Games (Goals)
1954–1961	North Melbourne	121 (129)
- ^{1} Playing statistics correct to the end of 1961.

Gerald Eastmure (born 20 February 1935) is a former Australian rules footballer who played with North Melbourne in the Victorian Football League (VFL).

Eastmure, a rover, played with North Melbourne for eight seasons, after making his way up from the fourths. He represented Victoria in 1957, 1959 and 1960.

In 1962 he left North Melbourne and joined Leeton, as captain-coach in the South West Football League (New South Wales).
