= Jack Haw =

Australian rules footballer, born 1902

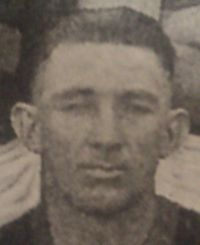

Personal information
- Full name: Mervyn John Haw
- Born: 27 December 1902; Warragul, Victoria
- Died: 29 April 1975 (aged 72); Rosebud, Victoria
- Original team: Leeton A.F.C.
- Position: Ruck

Playing career^{1}
Years	Club	Games (Goals)
1928–29	Melbourne	13 (6)
- ^{1} Playing statistics correct to the end of 1929.

Mervyn John Haw (27 December 1902 – 29 April 1975) was an Australian rules footballer who played with Melbourne in the Victorian Football League (VFL).

== Family ==
The son of Henry Haw (1855-1935), and Ellen Haw (1861-1944), née Barnes, Mervyn John Haw was born at Warragul on 27 December 1902.

He married Ivy Elizabeth Hamilton (1908-1963) in 1940.

== Football ==
=== Leeton (SWDFL) ===
In 1927 he was playing with the Leeton Australian Rules Football Club in the South West Football League (New South Wales), and was part of the team that won that competition's 1927 Grand Final.

=== Melbourne (VFL) ===
On 30 May 1928 "M.J. Haw" was granted a permit, from "New South Wales to Melbourne".

In its coverage of Melbourne's 1928 second pre-season practice match, The Age observed that, among the new players, "Haw, a big, strongly-built ruckman, who kicks well and plays hard, is considered to be one of the finds of the season".

=== Northcote (VFA) ===
On 23 April 1930, he was cleared from Melbourne to Northcote. He played in the first four home-and-away games for the Northcote First XVIII in the 1930 season. He was not selected in the fifth match (24 May 1930) because of an injury.

=== Richmond (VFL) ===
Having not been considered for either Northcote's First XVIII or its Second XVIII in home-and-away rounds five (24 May 1930) to nine (21 June 1930), Haw was granted a clearance from Northcote to play with Richmond on 23 June 1930. There is no record of him playing with the Richmond First XVIII in 1930.

=== Northcote (VFA) ===
On 29 April 1931 "M.J. Haw" was granted a clearance from "Richmond Seconds to Northcote", and appears on the club's final training list for 1931 as an "old player", although, iy seems, he did not play at all for either Northcote's First or Second XVIII in 1931.
