= Charles Pickerd =

Australian rules footballer

Personal information
- Full name: Charles Matthews Pickerd
- Born: 7 January 1892; North Melbourne, Victoria
- Died: 9 October 1933 (aged 41); Glen Huntly, Victoria
- Original team: Caulfield

Playing career^{1}
Years	Club	Games (Goals)
1910	St Kilda	1 (0)
- ^{1} Playing statistics correct to the end of 1910.

Charles Matthews Pickerd (7 January 1892 – 9 October 1933) was an Australian rules footballer who played with St Kilda in the Victorian Football League (VFL).

== Family ==
The son of Charles Martin Pickerd, and Annie Pickerd, née Bourne, Charles Matthews Pickerd was born at North Melbourne, Victoria on 7 January 1892.

He married Eileen May Winnacott (1889–1984) (later Mrs. Frederick Nicholas Jennings) on 22 March 1917.

== Football ==
=== St Kilda (VFL) ===
He played in one match for the St Kilda First XVIII, against Geelong, on 20 August 1910, at the age of 18.

=== Narrandera Imperials (SWDFA) ===
He was the captain of the Narrandera Imperials Football Club, in New South Wales, in 1914 when it won the premiership of the South West Football League (New South Wales).

== Death ==
He died at his Glen Huntly, Victoria residence on 9 October 1933.
