= Fred Mundy =

Australian rules footballer

Personal information
- Born: 5 January 1941 (age 85)
- Original team: Orbost
- Height: 180 cm (5 ft 11 in)
- Weight: 86 kg (190 lb)

Playing career^{1}
Years	Club	Games (Goals)
1959	Geelong	4 (0)
1960	Richmond	6 (1)
Total		10 (1)
- ^{1} Playing statistics correct to the end of 1960.

Fred Mundy (born 5 January 1941) is a former Australian rules footballer who played with Geelong and Richmond in the Victorian Football League (VFL).

Mundy, who played as a ruck-rover and in defence, came to Geelong from Orbost in 1959 and made four league appearances that year. At the beginning of the 1960 season, Mundy was cleared to Richmond. Mundy debuted for Richmond in round four, the first of four successive games that he would play, before he received a two-week suspension, for striking Footscray's Trevor Elliott. He played only two more games that season.

In 1961, Mundy had to return home to manage the family farm in Orbost, as his father had been severely injured in an accident.

In 1962, Mundy played with Bairnsdale in the Gippsland Football League, then was captain-coach of Griffith Football Club in the South West Football League (New South Wales) in 1963, playing 15 games. In 1964, Mundy played with Wagga Tigers, then in 1965 Mundy was captain-coach of Wagga Football Club.
