= Phil Gehrig =

Australian rules footballer

Personal information
- Full name: Phil Gehrig
- Born: 25 January 1935
- Died: 15 July 1993 (aged 58)
- Original team: Moulamein
- Height: 193 cm (6 ft 4 in)
- Weight: 84 kg (185 lb)

Playing career^{1}
Years	Club	Games (Goals)
1959–60	Footscray	16 (11)
- ^{1} Playing statistics correct to the end of 1960.

Phil Gehrig (25 January 1935 – 15 July 1993) was a former Australian rules footballer who played with Footscray in the Victorian Football League (VFL).

Gehrig coached Ganmain Football Club in the South West Football League (New South Wales) from 1968 to 1970. He was a first cousin once removed to Fraser Gehrig.
