= Geoff Kingston =

Australian rules footballer

Personal information
- Full name: Geoff Kingston
- Original team: Turvey Park South West Football League (New South Wales)
- Position: Full-forward

Playing career^{1}
Years	Club	Games (Goals)
1960–68	West Torrens	130 (301)
- ^{1} Playing statistics correct to the end of 1968.

Geoff Kingston is a former Australian rules footballer who played for West Torrens in the South Australian National Football League (SANFL). He was inducted into the South Australian Football Hall of Fame in 2008.

Born in Melbourne but raised in Wagga Wagga, Kingston played one season for Turvey Park in the South West Football League (New South Wales) and kicked over 100 goals before playing with West Torrens.

Kingston had an injury riddled but decorated career. He was used mostly at full-forward and in 1961, his second season, kicked 79 goals to top the league's goalkicking. In the same year he represented South Australia at the Brisbane Carnival where he scored five goals against the Victorian Football League side and four against Western Australia to win selection in the All-Australian team. He went on to represent South Australia in a total of 15 interstate matches and kicked 47 goals. He won West Torren's 'Best and fairest' award in 1965.
