= Les Main =

Australian rules footballer (1915–1998)

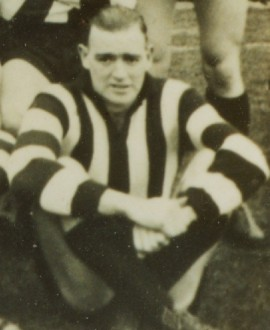
- Main in 1941

Personal information
- Full name: Leslie Llewellyn James Main
- Born: 26 November 1915; Clifton Hill, Victoria
- Died: 28 November 1998 (aged 83)
- Original team: Albury
- Height: 178 cm (5 ft 10 in)
- Weight: 80.5 kg (177 lb)

Playing career^{1}
Years	Club	Games (Goals)
1941–43	Collingwood	21 (26)
- ^{1} Playing statistics correct to the end of 1943.

Leslie Llewellyn James Main (26 November 1915 – 28 November 1998) was an Australian rules footballer who played with Collingwood in the Victorian Football League (VFL).

Main became a coach after leaving Collingwood and had success in the Hampden Football League with Warrnambool, which he guided to premierships in 1946 and 1947.

He spent the 1948 season as coach of New South Wales club, Leeton, losing the preliminary final by four points and Main was runner up in the South West Football League (New South Wales) best and fairest award, the Gammage Medal.

Main then returned to the Hampden Football League as coach of Terang for two years, before moving on to Noorat in 1951.
