= Tom Carroll (Australian footballer) =

Australian rules footballer

Personal information
- Nickname: Turkey Tom
- Born: 14 October 1939 (age 87); Ganmain, New South Wales
- Original team: Ganmain
- Height: 184 cm (6 ft 0 in)
- Weight: 82 kg (181 lb)
- Position: Forward

Playing career^{1}
Years	Club	Games (Goals)
1961–1963	Carlton	55 (143)
- ^{1} Playing statistics correct to the end of 1963.

Career highlights
- Coleman Medal: (1961); 3 × Carlton leading goalkicker: (1961, 1962, 1963); 3 x South West Football League (New South Wales) leading goalkicker: 1960, 1964, 1965; Ganmain FC best & fairest: 1959, 1960; Ganmain FC Premierships: 1957, 1958, 1964, 1965

Tom Carroll (born 14 October 1939) is a former Australian rules footballer who played for the Carlton Football Club in the Victorian Football League (VFL).

Nicknamed 'Turkey Tom' because of his family's turkey farm near Ganmain in the Riverina region and was playing full forward for Ganmain in 1956 and kicked over 100 goals in 1960 for Ganmain and initially played with Carlton on six day permits in 1961.

Carroll was the first Carlton player since Harry Vallence to lead the VFL's goalkicking at the end of a home-and-away season, scoring 54 goals in 1961 and later being awarded the Coleman Medal after the medal was retrospectively given to the VFL leading goalkickers in the home-and-away season dating back to 1955.

Carroll led Carlton's goalkicking again in 1962, and played a key part in a finals campaign which involved a preliminary final draw and a narrow escape in the replay against Geelong to qualify for the 1962 VFL grand final against Essendon. Carroll was goalless as the Bombers dashed out to an early lead at quarter time and won easily.

Carroll's VFL career came to an end when he decided to return to the family farm after the 1963 VFL season at the age of 24.

Carroll was the leading goalkicker in the South West Football League (New South Wales) in 1964 (102) goals and 1965 (98) goals, with Ganmain Football Club. He was their captain-coach from 1964 to 1966 and were premiers in 1964 and 1965.

In 1988 he moved with his three children to Albury, where he worked as a plant operator with the Albury Council and coached North Albury's Under 18 football team. He is the younger brother of Laurie Carroll and an uncle of former Sydney captain, Dennis Carroll.
