= Mike Quade (footballer) =

Australian rules footballer

Personal information
- Full name: Michael Thomas Quade
- Born: 16 September 1944 (age 82); Narrandera, New South Wales
- Original team: Ariah Park
- Height: 193 cm (6 ft 4 in)
- Weight: 98 kg (216 lb)

Playing career^{1}
Years	Club	Games (Goals)
1966–68	North Melbourne	16 (9)
- ^{1} Playing statistics correct to the end of 1968.

Michael Thomas Quade (born 16 September 1944) is a former Australian rules footballer who played with North Melbourne in the Victorian Football League (VFL).

He played over a period of three seasons for North Melbourne as a Ruckman. Due to a persistent leg injury he was forced to retire early in his playing career. He is the brother of VFL footballers Tom Quade and Ricky Quade.
