= Kane Lucas =

Australian rules footballer

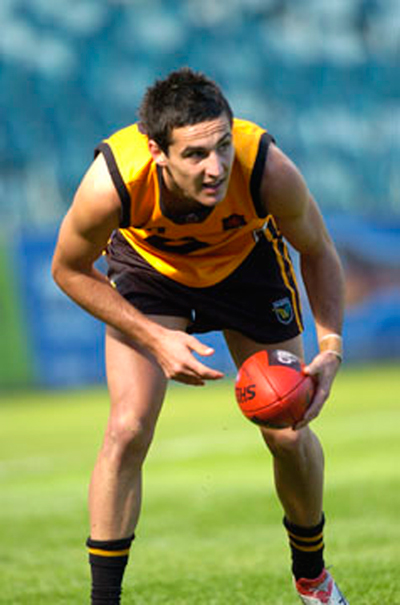
- Kane Lucas playing for Western Australia

Personal information
- Full name: Kane Lucas
- Born: 26 June 1991 (age 35)
- Original team: East Fremantle (WAFL)
- Draft: No. 12, 2009 National draft, Carlton
- Height: 188 cm (6 ft 2 in)
- Weight: 83 kg (183 lb)
- Position: Midfielder / Defender

Playing career^{1}
Years	Club	Games (Goals)
2010–2014	Carlton	42 (15)
2015–2016	West Coast	0 (0)
Total		42 (15)
- ^{1} Playing statistics correct to the end of 2016.

Kane Lucas is a former professional Australian rules footballer who played for the Carlton Football Club in the Australian Football League (AFL). He was listed with the West Coast Eagles for the 2015 and 2016 seasons, but failed to play a senior match.

Lucas, the son of Jack Lucas who played for the Sydney Swans in the 1980s, played during his junior years at Trinity College in Western Australia and played most of his club football for Melville Hawks Junior Football Club, with a few years at Winnacott Junior Football Club, before playing Colts and senior football with the East Fremantle Football Club, playing twelve senior games during 2009 as a 17/18 year old. He represented Western Australia in its victorious 2009 AFL National Under 18 Championship campaign, earning a position as half-forward flank in the 2009 AFL Under 18s All Australian team. He nominated for the 2009 AFL National Draft, and was recruited by the Carlton Football Club with its first round selection at number 12 overall.

Lucas made his AFL debut in Round 3, 2010 against Essendon. He was hampered by a hamstring injury throughout his first season, which kept him to only eight games, but he was the winner of the Carlton Best First Year Player award. He struggled with injuries and form in 2011, playing only 2 games; but, in a small part of football history, Lucas was the first player ever to be substituted onto the ground under the AFL's revised interchange rules in Round 1, 2011, replacing the concussed Jarrad Waite in the season's opening match against Richmond.

Lucas was delisted by Carlton at the conclusion of the 2014 AFL season. He was redrafted onto the rookie list by the West Coast Eagles in 2015, but in two years with the club was unable to break into the Eagles' senior side, and he was delisted at the conclusion of the 2016 season without playing a senior game for West Coast.
