= Dudley Mattingly =

Australian rules footballer

Personal information
- Full name: Dudley Edward Mattingly
- Born: 3 April 1928; Ganmain, New South Wales
- Died: 19 September 1996 (aged 68); Ganmain, New South Wales
- Original team: Ganmain
- Height: 178 cm (5 ft 10 in)
- Weight: 80 kg (176 lb)

Playing career^{1}
Years	Club	Games (Goals)
1948	St Kilda	3 (0)
- ^{1} Playing statistics correct to the end of 1948.

Dudley Edward Mattingly (3 April 1928 – 19 September 1996) was an Australian rules footballer who played 3 games with St Kilda in the Victorian Football League (VFL) in 1948.
