= Des Lyons =

Australian rules footballer

Personal information
- Full name: Des Lyons
- Born: 9 June 1938 (age 88); Barellan, NSW
- Original team: Leeton
- Height: 183 cm (6 ft 0 in)
- Weight: 95 kg (209 lb)

Playing career^{1}
Years	Club	Games (Goals)
1960	Carlton	2 (1)
- ^{1} Playing statistics correct to the end of 1983.

Des Lyons (born 9 June 1938) is a former Australian rules footballer who played with Carlton in the Victorian Football League (VFL).

Lyons was from Barellan in the Riverina in southern NSW. A powerfully-built 183 cm forward, he had strong hands and a booming kick. As a teenager he briefly trained with Collingwood but returned home. As he matured, his talent was obvious, getting the attention of Carlton talent scouts.

Carlton managed to lure him down on permits in 1960, he played rounds 1 and 3 missing round 2 with injury. Shortly afterwards, Des told Carlton that he would not be continuing on. The lure of a family cartage business and the homesickness caused Des to return home.

Lyons resumed playing for Leeton helping the team to three Premierships. He won two League Best and Fairests, and was South West Football League's top goal-kicker in 1967 with 67 goals. He represented the SWDFL on 20 occasions.
