= Geoff Willis (footballer) =

Australian rules footballer

Personal information
- Full name: Geoff Willis
- Born: 20 August 1921
- Died: 27 October 1986 (aged 65)
- Height: 173 cm (5 ft 8 in)
- Weight: 74 kg (163 lb)

Playing career^{1}
Years	Club	Games (Goals)
1940–44	North Melbourne	36 (3)
- ^{1} Playing statistics correct to the end of 1944.

Geoff Willis (20 August 1921 – 27 October 1986) was an Australian rules footballer who played with North Melbourne in the Victorian Football League (VFL).

Willis was captain-coach of Griffith Football Club in the South West Football League (New South Wales) in 1947 (3rd) and 1948 (4th) and he won the 1948 SWDFL Gammage Medal.
