= Wayne Weidemann =

Australian rules footballer & coach (born 1966)

Personal information
- Full name: Wayne Weidemann
- Born: 21 October 1966 (age 60)
- Original team: Woodville-West Torrens (SANFL)
- Height: 182 cm (6 ft 0 in)
- Weight: 93 kg (205 lb)

Playing career^{1}
Years	Club	Games (Goals)
1991–1996	Adelaide	68 (26)
- ^{1} Playing statistics correct to the end of 1996.

Wayne Weidemann (born 21 October 1966) is a former professional Australian rules footballer who played for the Adelaide Football Club in the Australian Football League (AFL). The “Weed” as he was fondly known as, was a highly underrated player, often showing strength, agility, versatility and ability in directing play up forward or back.

== Early life ==
Weidemann, the son of Collingwood Football Club player Peter Weidemann, was originally from Fish Creek in the South Gippsland region of Victoria. He began playing Under-8s for the Fish Creek Football Club.

As a teenager he was scouted by St Kilda and played trail matches. In 1988 also trained with Richmond and Collingwood. However he was not selected in the 1988 VFL Draft.

Hoping to be picked up by the struggling Sydney Swans through regional zoning, he moved to Canberra and played with the Eastlake Football Club. During this time he made the ACT representative squad. It was there that he was recruited by Woodville-West Torrens Football Club in the South Australian National Football League (SANFL) where he spent the 1990 season.

== AFL career ==
In 1991 he was invited to train with the AFL's Adelaide Crows, though still eligible for the draft, the Crows did not take him in the 1991 AFL draft however he was kept on their list and made his AFL debut against Hawthorn at Waverley Park in Round 16.

Weidemann played 68 AFL games between 1991 and 1996 and kicked 26 goals. Nicknamed "Weed", Weidemann was a fearsome looking character with long blond hair and a fierce stare reminiscent of a Viking warrior. He had a cult following amongst Adelaide fans, and the collective cry of "Weed" could be heard whenever he went near the ball during an Adelaide home game.

Rumours of internal disgruntled selection table members for three years constantly created disharmony for the AAT panel and the AFL courtesy of Weidemann's omission from the team.

== Post-AFL ==
After his retirement from the AFL, he coached SANFL club West Adelaide, before being sacked from the position in 2007. Prior to coaching West Adelaide, he played at SAAFL club Kilburn then was player coach at SAAFL division one club Gaza, where they were Premiers in 2003, their Centenary year.

Weidemann was an assistant coach at Devonport in the Tasmanian Statewide Football League, winning a William Leitch Medal in 1998.

Weidemann also coached the Coolamon Rovers Football club in the Riverina Football League from 1999 to 2001, taking them to two Grand Finals and one Premiership during his tenure.

In 2010, Weidemann was coach at South Australian Amateur Football League (SAAFL) Division Two club PHOS Camden. Although Wayne got the side back into Division 1, Weidemann parted ways with PHOS and signed as coach of the struggling Broadview Football Club Division 1 A Grade side in 2013 also re-signing in 2014. He replaced former SANFL player Phil Harrison. Broadview are continuing to struggle in Division 1 as they have been plagued with injuries. Weidemann has come into Broadview in 2013 with other new Coaching staff including former Port Adelaide player and two time SANFL Magarey Medallist Damian Squire and Mark Kemp. Wayne, along with Squire and Kemp, moved to coach Walkerville Football Club for the 2017 season and were reappointed for the 2018 and 2019 seasons.

Since 2021 Wayne's son Jake plays for the Port Adelaide Magpies in the SANFL, he is the current vice captain
