= Laurie Carroll =

Australian rules footballer

Personal information
- Full name: Lawrence Patrick Carroll
- Born: 25 March 1926; Ganmain, New South Wales
- Died: 10 August 2015 (aged 89); Albury, New South Wales
- Original team: Ganmain
- Height: 187 cm (6 ft 2 in)
- Weight: 83 kg (183 lb)

Playing career^{1}
Years	Club	Games (Goals)
1948–49	St Kilda	11 (2)
- ^{1} Playing statistics correct to the end of 1949.

Lawrence Patrick 'Dooley' Carroll (25 March 1926 – 10 August 2015) was an Australian rules footballer who played with St Kilda in the Victorian Football League (VFL).

Originally from Ganmain, his brother Tom Carroll played for Carlton and his son Dennis Carroll played for Sydney. He was one of nine Carrolls who represented Ganmain in the 1957 premiership winning team.

Carroll was considered a champion of New South Wales football, playing in seven premierships for Ganmain (1946, 1947, 1950, 1951, 1953, 1956 and 1957), was regarded as one of the best high marks in the South West Football League (New South Wales), and was voted as best player for NSW at the 1950 Brisbane Carnival.

Older brother of former Carlton player, Tom Carroll.
