= Tom Allen (Australian footballer) =

Australian rules footballer

Personal information
- Born: 18 April 1930
- Original team: Richmond Mutuals
- Debut: Round 14 1949, Richmond vs. North Melbourne
- Height: 180 cm (5 ft 11 in)
- Weight: 83 kg (183 lb)

Playing career^{1}
Years	Club	Games (Goals)
1949–1952	Richmond	22 (8)
- ^{1} Playing statistics correct to the end of 1952.

Tom Allen (born 18 April 1930) is a former Australian rules footballer. He played in the VFL with the Richmond Football Club from 1949 to 1952.

In his debut game against North Melbourne he kicked 11 behinds. This set a record for most behinds in a game without a goal. The record was later equalled by Stuart Spencer of the Demons.

Allen was captain-coach of Griffith Football Club in the South West Football League (New South Wales) in 1957 and 1958 and kicked 87 goals in 34 games.

Allen went on to coach a number of teams, finally coaching Richmond's Fourths, the Essex Heights Under 17s, from 1965 to 1980. Under his guidance Essex Heights won premierships in 1973, 1975, 1976, 1977, 1978 and 1979. He was coach of Victoria at the 1975 Australian Schoolboys' Championships.
