= Peter Weidemann =

Australian rules footballer

Peter Weideman

Personal information
- Full name: Peter John Weidemann
- Born: 23 March 1940
- Died: 15 June 2012 (aged 72)
- Original team: Dandenong
- Height: 174 cm (5 ft 9 in)
- Weight: 74.5 kg (164 lb)

Playing career^{1}
Years	Club	Games (Goals)
1960–61	Collingwood	5 (0)
- ^{1} Playing statistics correct to the end of 1961.

Peter Weidemann (23 March 1940 – 15 June 2012) was an Australian rules footballer who played with Collingwood in the Victorian Football League (VFL).

After leaving Collingwood he played and coached many teams in Tasmania, New South Wales and country Victoria. He is the father of former Adelaide footballer Wayne Weidemann.

Weidemann coached Coolamon Football Club in the South West Football League (New South Wales) in 1964 and 1965, as well as the SWDFL representative side that won the 1964 VCFL Country Championships.

In 1965, Weidemann won the SWDFL best and fairest award, the Gammage Medal.
