= Max Kruse (Australian footballer) =

Australian rules footballer (born 1958)

Personal information
- Born: 29 October 1958 (age 68)
- Original team: Leeton (SWDFL)
- Height: 188 cm (6 ft 2 in)
- Weight: 91 kg (201 lb)

Playing career^{1}
| Years | Club | Games (Goals) |
| 1979–1985 | South Melbourne/Sydney | 88 (32) |
| 1986–1989 | Glenelg | 73 (25) |
| Total | | 161 (57) |
- ^{1} Playing statistics correct to the end of 1989.

Career highlights
- Glenelg premiership 1986

Max Kruse (born 29 October 1958) is a former Australian rules footballer who played with the South Melbourne/Sydney in the Victorian Football League (VFL).

Kruse was named after his father, Max Kruse, a former Prahran ruckman who represented the Victorian Football Association at the 1953 Adelaide Carnival. Kruse senior was appointed coach of New South Wales club Leeton in 1957 and his son was born the following year.

In 1978, Kruse kicked 52 goals for Leeton, playing mainly from centre half forward and finished third in the league medal, the Gammage Medal, on 16 votes. He played in their 1978 premiership when Leeton defeated Turvey Park in the SWDFL grand final.

A centre half-forward / centre half-back, Kruse joined South Melbourne in 1979 and played eight games that year, all from round 13. He made another nine appearances in 1980, then from 1981 to 1984 put together 53 consecutive games. A thigh injury in 1985 kept him out of the league team for much of the year and he played only three games. It would be Kruse's final season with the Swans, he then spent four years with Glenelg from 1986 to 1989, after moving to South Australia for business reasons. He was a member of Glenelg's 1986 premiership team.

== Links ==
- 1978 - SWDFL Premiers: Leeton FC team photo
- 1986 - SANFL Premiers: Glenelg FC team photo
