= Dean Chapman =

Australian rules footballer

Personal information
- Full name: Dean Cyril Chapman
- Born: 2 January 1931
- Died: 22 March 1965 (aged 34); South Yarra, Victoria
- Height: 182 cm (6 ft 0 in)
- Weight: 80 kg (176 lb)

Playing career^{1}
Years	Club	Games (Goals)
1948–51	St Kilda	17 (1)
- ^{1} Playing statistics correct to the end of 1951.

Dean Cyril Chapman (2 January 1931 – 22 March 1965) was an Australian rules footballer who played with St Kilda in the Victorian Football League (VFL). He previously played for Melbourne's reserves before being cleared to St Kilda in April 1948.

Chapman was captain-coach of the Coolamon Football Club in the South West Football League (New South Wales) in 1953 and 1954., who finished eighth, with one win and thirteen losses in 1953 and 9th in 1954.

Chapman represented the SWDFL representative team against the Albury & District Football League in 1954.
