= Victor Hugo (Australian footballer) =

Australian rules footballer

Personal information
- Born: 5 November 1953 (age 72)
- Original teams: Coleambally, Narrandera
- Height: 191 cm (6 ft 3 in)
- Weight: 89 kg (196 lb)

Playing career^{1}
Years	Club	Games (Goals)
1980	South Melbourne	2 (0)
- ^{1} Playing statistics correct to the end of 1980.

Victor Hugo (born 5 November 1953) is a former Australian rules footballer who played with South Melbourne in the Victorian Football League (VFL).

Hugo, at the age of 26, appeared in the opening two rounds of the 1980 VFL season, as a centre half-back, after he kicked 11 goals in Narrandera's 1979 South West Football League (New South Wales) grand final win over Ariah Park Mirrool. Both games were won by South Melbourne, over Geelong at Kardinia Park and then Footscray at Lake Oval.

A Narrandera recruit, Hugo performed well enough to continue in the South Melbourne team, but opted to return home to the country.

He was the Riverina Football League leading goal-kicker in 1985.
