= Ray Dawson =

Australian rules footballer

Personal information
- Full name: Ray Dawson
- Born: 8 May 1941
- Original team: Sale
- Height: 177 cm (5 ft 10 in)
- Weight: 80.5 kg (177 lb)

Playing career^{1}
Years	Club	Games (Goals)
1961–63	Melbourne	35 (19)
1964	South Melbourne	4 (0)
Total		39 (19)
- ^{1} Playing statistics correct to the end of 1964.

Ray Dawson (born 8 May 1941) is a former Australian rules footballer who played with Melbourne and South Melbourne in the Victorian Football League (VFL).
