= Ganmain =

- Town
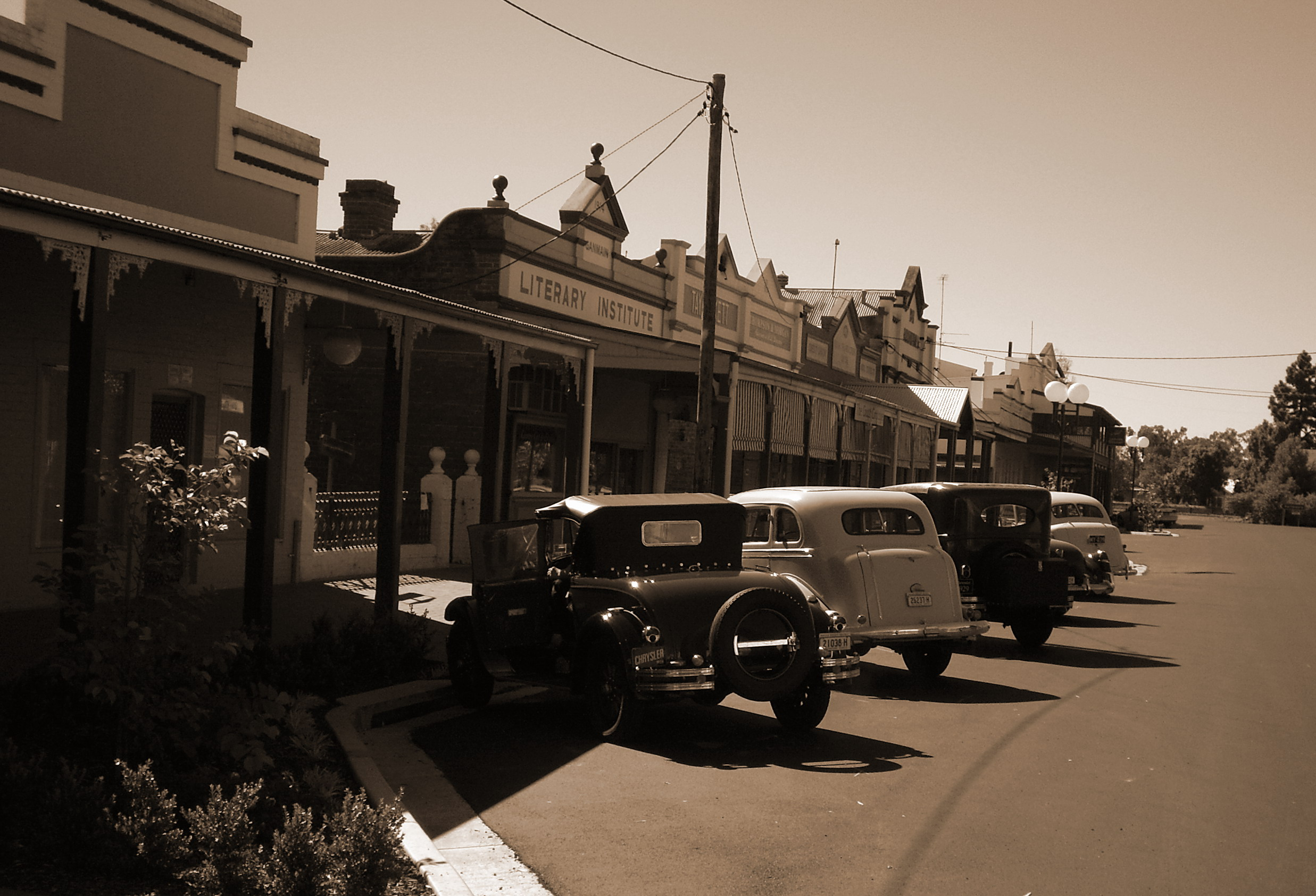
- Main Street of Ganmain as it is today: complete with vintage cars

- Coordinates: 34°48′0″S 147°02′0″E
- Country: Australia
- State: New South Wales
- LGA: Coolamon Shire Council
- Location: 494 km (307 mi) SW of Sydney; 486 km (302 mi) N of Melbourne; 57 km (35 mi) NW of Wagga Wagga; 15 km (9.3 mi) W of Coolamon

Government
  - State electorate: Cootamundra
  - Federal division: Riverina

Population
  - Total: 793 (2021 census)
- Postcode: 2702
- County: Bourke

Ganmain is a town in the Riverina region of New South Wales, Australia. Ganmain is located around 55 kilometres (34 mi) north west of Wagga Wagga, and 50 kilometres (31 mi) east of Narrandera. Ganmain is in the Coolamon Shire local government area and at the 2021 census had a population of 793.

== History ==
The town name is said to be an Aboriginal word meaning "Crown scenes on the Moon for tribal reasons" or "native decorated with scars".

Ganmain takes its name from Ganmain Run, a cattle station established in 1838, by settler James Devlin.

Boggy Creek Post Office opened on 10 December 1888, was renamed Derry in 1894 and Ganmain later the same year.

In 1973, the Ganmain Historical Society was opened by six local families.

== Today ==
Ganmain is the self-proclaimed "Sheaf Hay centre of Australia" and has produced chaff for many leading racehorse trainers in Australia. The Big Haystack in Pioneer Park reflects this background.

The town has two primary schools, Ganmain Public School and St. Brendan's Catholic Primary School.

== Sport ==
The most popular sport in Ganmain is Australian rules football, as it lies on the Canola Way, a geographical pocket stretching from Grong Grong and Marrar, in which Australian football retains a strong following, despite New South Wales being a largely rugby league supporting state. The local team, Ganmain-Grong Grong-Matong, plays in the Riverina Football Netball League.

== Notable people from Ganmain ==
- Russell Campbell – Australian rules footballer
- Francis Carroll – Former Catholic Archbishop of the Roman Catholic Archdiocese of Canberra and Goulburn
- Dennis Carroll – Australian rules footballer
- Jim Carroll – Australian rules footballer
- Laurie Carroll – Australian rules footballer
- Tom Carroll – Australian rules footballer
- Wayne Carroll – Australian rules footballer
- Frank Gumbleton – Australian rules footballer

Preceding station	Former services	Following station
Matong towards Hay	Hay Line	Coolamon towards Junee
