= Ian Gillett =

Australian rules footballer

Personal information
- Born: 20 September 1928
- Died: 28 February 2008 (aged 79)
- Original team: South Surfers
- Height: 188 cm (6 ft 2 in)
- Weight: 86 kg (190 lb)

Playing career^{1}
Years	Club	Games (Goals)
1951–1958	South Melbourne	135 (112)
- ^{1} Playing statistics correct to the end of 1958.

Ian Gillett (20 September 1928 – 28 February 2008) was an Australian rules footballer who played with South Melbourne in the VFL during the 1950s.

Gillett was a ruckman but was also capable of playing the key positions. He was South Melbourne's leading goalkicker in 1953 and won the Best and Fairest award in 1956.

Gillett was captain-coach of Coolamon Football Club from 1959 to 1963 and steered them to a premiership in 1959.

Gillett was captain of the South West Football League (New South Wales) representative team that won the 1964 VFCL Country Championships.
