= Maddy Collier =

Australian rules footballer

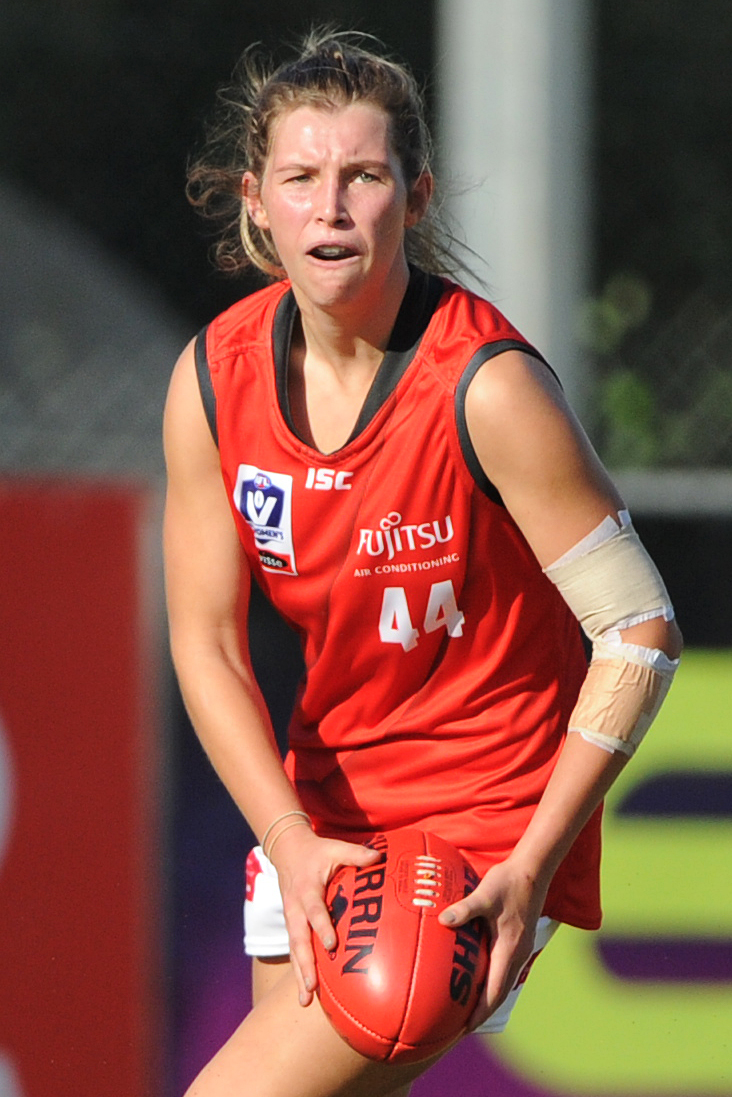
- Collier in May 2018

Personal information
- Born: 14 September 1995 (age 31); Nowra NSW
- Original team: UNSW-Eastern Suburbs Stingrays (SWAFL)
- Draft: Priority signing GWS
- Debut: Round 1, 2017, Greater Western Sydney vs. Adelaide, at Thebarton Oval
- Height: 165 cm (5 ft 5 in)
- Position: Utility

Club information
- Current club: Sydney
- Number: 14

Playing career^{1}
Years	Club	Games (Goals)
2017–2019	Greater Western Sydney	15 (0)
2020–2022	West Coast	19 (3)
S7 (2022)–	Sydney	5 (0)
Total		39 (3)
- ^{1} Playing statistics correct to the end of the 2023 season.

Career highlights
- Sydney co-captain: 2022

Maddy Collier (born 14 September 1995) is an Australian rules footballer playing for Sydney in the AFL Women's competition. Collier was recruited by Greater Western Sydney as a priority player in September 2016. She made her debut in the thirty-six point loss to Adelaide at Thebarton Oval in the opening round of the 2017 season. She played every match in her debut season to finish with seven games.

In April 2019, Collier joined expansion club West Coast. It was revealed Collier signed on with West Coast on 25 June 2021.

In March 2022 it was announced that Collier will join expansion club Sydney, with the signing being officially confirmed in May. She was announced in August 2022 as one of Sydney's inaugural co-captains.
