= Jim Prentice (footballer) =

Australian rules footballer

Personal information
- Full name: James Ernest Prentice
- Born: 28 December 1949
- Died: 24 September 2010 (aged 60); Temora, New South Wales
- Original team: Ariah Park
- Height: 187 cm (6 ft 2 in)
- Weight: 89 kg (196 lb)
- Position: Half Forward

Playing career^{1}
Years	Club	Games (Goals)
1971–74	South Melbourne	58 (44)
- ^{1} Playing statistics correct to the end of 1974.

James Ernest Prentice (28 December 1949 – 24 September 2010) was an Australian rules footballer who played with South Melbourne in the Victorian Football League (VFL).

Prentice returned to play with Ariah Park - Mirrool and won two South West Football League best and fairest awards, the Gammage Medal in 1975 and 1977 and was runner up in 1979 too.

Prentice was captain coach of Ariah Park - Mirrool from 1976 to 1977.

Prentice was captain-coach of Devonport Football Club for one year in 1978 and won the Wander Medal in the North West Football Union, while playing with Devonport.

Prentice then returned to play with Ariah Park - Mirrool and was captain of the 1979 South West Football League inter league representative side.

Prentice was captain coach of Girral - West Wyalong in 1987 and kicked eight goals in their Northern Riverina Football League grand final defeat of Four Corners. Prentice also played in Girral - West Wyalong's 1988 premiership, which was coached by Pat Daniher.
