= Kevin Kallady =

Australian rules footballer

Personal information
- Full name: Kevin Kallady
- Born: 4 July 1923
- Died: 7 September 2008 (aged 85)
- Original team: Yarram
- Height: 184 cm (6 ft 0 in)
- Weight: 90 kg (198 lb)

Playing career^{1}
Years	Club	Games (Goals)
1945–46	St Kilda	13 (4)
- ^{1} Playing statistics correct to the end of 1946.

Kevin Kallady (4 July 1923 – 7 September 2008) was an Australian rules footballer who played with St Kilda in the Victorian Football League (VFL).

Kallady was captain-coach of Narrandera Football Club in the South West Football League (New South Wales) in 1949.
