= Frank Gumbleton =

Australian rules footballer

Personal information
- Born: 6 March 1951 (age 75); Ganmain, New South Wales
- Original team: Ganmain
- Height: 185 cm (6 ft 1 in)
- Weight: 89 kg (196 lb)
- Position: Back Pocket

Playing career^{1}
Years	Club	Games (Goals)
1970–1979	North Melbourne	147 (19)
- ^{1} Playing statistics correct to the end of 1979.

Career highlights
- North Melbourne Football Club: North Melbourne Premiership Teams 1975, 1977

Frank Gumbleton (born 6 March 1951) is a former Australian rules footballer who played with the North Melbourne Football Club in the Victorian Football League during the 1970s. Gumbleton was recruited from the country NSW football club of Ganmain. He was a premiership player for Ganmain in 1969.

Gumbleton primarily played as a back pocket defender.While his playing style was characterized by reliability rather than versatility or flair,He was a key component in the North Melbourne defensive unit during the 1970s. His defensive discipline is credited with helping solidify the team's backline during their premiership-winning era

Following his VFL tenure, Gumbleton captain-coached Windsor-Zillmere in Queensland's QAFL from 1980 to 1982, securing a 1981 premiership and captaining the state in a 1982 exhibition against Canberra during the Commonwealth Games. He later played for Brunswick in the VFA in 1983, Wangaratta Magpies in 1984 (Ovens & Murray FL), and Craigieburn from 1985 to 1986 before retiring at age 35 in 1987; he briefly volunteered as a runner for North Melbourne in 1989–1990.
