= Warren Roper (footballer) =

Australian rules footballer

Personal information
- Full name: Warren Roper
- Born: 30 September 1940 (age 86)
- Original team: West Perth (WAFL)
- Height: 188 cm (6 ft 2 in)
- Weight: 81 kg (179 lb)
- Position: Ruckman

Playing career^{1}
| Years | Club | Games (Goals) |
| 1961–65, 1967 | Collingwood | 56 (32) |
- ^{1} Playing statistics correct to the end of 1967.

Warren Roper (born 30 September 1940) is a former Australian rules footballer who played for Collingwood in the Victorian Football League (VFL) during the 1960s.

A West Perth recruit, Roper was used as a ruckman at Collingwood. He kicked 17 goals in 1962, with six of them coming in a win over Geelong at Kardinia Park. Roper missed the 1964 VFL Grand Final, which Collingwood lost, although he had made appearances earlier in the season but he didn't play at all in the 1966 VFL season when Collingwood were again runners-up.

Roper was captain-coach of Narrandera Football Club in the South West Football League (New South Wales) in 1970 and 1971.

Roper later captain-coached Coragulac in country Victoria and was coach of Queensland at the 1979 Perth State of Origin Carnival.
