= Dennis Carroll =

Australian rules footballer

Personal information
- Born: 7 November 1960 (age 66); Ganmain, New South Wales
- Original teams: Ganmain, Lockhart, Tumbarumba, Albury
- Height: 187 cm (6 ft 2 in)
- Weight: 86 kg (190 lb)
- Position: Half-back flank

Playing career^{1}
Years	Club	Games (Goals)
1981–1993	South Melbourne/Sydney	219 (117)
- ^{1} Playing statistics correct to the end of 1993.

Career highlights
- Tumbarumba best & fairest: 1979; Sydney captain: 1986–1992; Representative matches for O&MFNL, Victoria & NSW; Sydney Swans Team of the Century: half-back flank

Dennis Carroll (born 7 November 1960) is a former Australian rules footballer who played with the Sydney Swans in the Victorian Football League (VFL). He was the last South Melbourne player to retire for Sydney.

== Career ==
From Ganmain, a small town outside Wagga Wagga, New South Wales, Carroll came from a football family. Carroll's father Laurie (St Kilda Football Club) and uncle Tom (Carlton Football Club) also played in the VFL.

Carroll played with Tumbarumba in the Upper Murray Football League in 1979 and with Albury in the Ovens & Murray Football League in 1980, then was recruited by the Swans in the VFL via a zoning rule, which enabled the Swans to recruit players from New South Wales. His first season was playing out of the Lake Oval in Melbourne in 1981, before moving with the Swans permanently to Sydney.

Carroll, a back flanker, became known as one of the finest kicks in the VFL, with the ability to dispose of the ball equally well on either foot. As an experienced campaigner and local product, Carroll was selected to captain the Sydney Swans in the Australian Football League, an honour which he held for seven seasons between 1986 and 1992, during some of the club's darkest days and the brink of extinction. He represented both Victoria and New South Wales at State of Origin level.

Carroll retired from the AFL in 1993. During his career he totalled 219 games for the Swans and was named on the Swans team of the century. The award for the most improved player at the Sydney Swans, the Dennis Carroll Award is named in his honour. The Sydney Cricket Ground has named a room the Kippax/Carroll room in honour of Dennis Carroll and cricketer Alan Kippax.

After retiring in 1993, Dennis spent four years as Sydney reserves coach and was later the Swans' match committee chairman.
