= Jack Lucas (footballer) =

Australian rules footballer

Personal information
- Full name: John Mark Lucas
- Born: 8 April 1961 (age 65)
- Original team: Ariah Park Mirrool (SWDFL)
- Height: 180 cm (5 ft 11 in)
- Weight: 83 kg (183 lb)

Playing career^{1}
Years	Club	Games (Goals)
1982–1984	Sydney Swans	19 (6)
1985-1987	Perth (WAFL)	40 (18)
Total		59 (24)
- ^{1} Playing statistics correct to the end of 1984.

John Mark "Jack" Lucas (born 8 April 1961) is a former Australian rules footballer who played with the Sydney Swans in the Victorian Football League (VFL) and Perth Football Club in the West Australian Football League (WAFL).

Lucas, a New South Wales recruit from South Western District Football League club Ariah Park Mirrool, played league football with Sydney from 1982 to 1984, the club's first three seasons after relocation from Melbourne. He played 19 VFL games for Sydney, 12 of them in the 1983 season.

Following his VFL career, Lucas moved to Western Australian Football League club and joined Perth, playing 40 games in three seasons.

Lucas also spent a season in the ACT Football League with Queanbeyan in 1989 and won a premiership. Queanbeyan was coached by his uncle Brian Quade, brother of Ricky Quade.

Back in Perth, Lucas coached junior footballers, including his son Kane Lucas, who would go on to be drafted by Carlton.
