= Wayne Evans (Australian footballer) =

Australian rules footballer

Personal information
- Full name: Wayne Evans
- Born: 5 October 1958 (age 68)
- Original team: Grong Grong Matong
- Height: 178 cm (5 ft 10 in)
- Weight: 73 kg (161 lb)

Playing career^{1}
Years	Club	Games (Goals)
1977	South Melbourne	11 (7)
- ^{1} Playing statistics correct to the end of 1977.

Wayne Evans (born 5 October 1958) is a former Australian rules footballer who played with South Melbourne in the Victorian Football League (VFL).
