= Wayne Carroll =

Australian rules footballer

Personal information
- Full name: Wayne Carroll
- Born: 22 March 1958 (age 68)
- Original team: Ganmain (SWFL)
- Height: 183 cm (6 ft 0 in)
- Weight: 80 kg (176 lb)
- Position: Forward

Playing career^{1}
Years	Club	Games (Goals)
1979–85	South Melbourne	56 (57)
- ^{1} Playing statistics correct to the end of 1985.

Wayne Carroll (born 22 March 1958) is a former Australian rules footballer who played with South Melbourne in the Victorian Football League (VFL).

Wayne “Christmas” Carroll started playing seniors with Ganmain Football Club in 1976 and played a key role in winning Ganmain’s last-ever premiership as a stand-alone club in the South West Football League (SWFL).

Carroll transferred to Queanbeyan Football Club in the ACTAFL in 1977, playing in their premiership that year. In 1978, he re-joined brother, “Jock” (Greg), at Farrer Football League club Mangoplah-Cookardinia United and his ongoing form led to South Melbourne signing Carroll on a permit, allowing him to make his senior VFL debut in 1979.

Upon returning to the Riverina in 1986, “Christmas” took over as captain-coach of Turvey Park in Wagga and led the Bulldogs to four premierships in a row, 1987-1990.

“Christmas” represented NSW in 1979 under Alan Jeans and then again from 1986 to 1990.

He won the VFL Mark of the Year award in 1984.
