= Russell Campbell =

Australian rules footballer

Personal information
- Full name: Russell Campbell
- Born: 11 June 1957 (age 69)
- Original team: Ganmain
- Height: 180 cm (5 ft 11 in)
- Weight: 76 kg (168 lb)

Playing career^{1}
Years	Club	Games (Goals)
1978, 1980	South Melbourne	4 (3)
- ^{1} Playing statistics correct to the end of 1980.

Russell Campbell (born 11 June 1957) is a former Australian rules footballer who played with South Melbourne in the Victorian Football League (VFL).
