= Jim Carroll (Australian footballer) =

Australian rules footballer

Personal information
- Full name: James Carroll
- Born: 10 August 1939
- Died: 4 May 2020 (aged 80)
- Original team: Ganmain
- Height: 175 cm (5 ft 9 in)
- Weight: 76 kg (168 lb)

Playing career^{1}
Years	Club	Games (Goals)
1961–62	Carlton	2 (2)
- ^{1} Playing statistics correct to the end of 1962.

Jim Carroll (10 August 1939 – 4 May 2020) was an Australian rules footballer who played with Carlton in the Victorian Football League (VFL).
