= Joe Scanlan (footballer) =

Australian rules footballer

Personal information
- Full name: Joseph Michael Scanlan
- Born: 19 March 1900; Albert Park, Victoria
- Died: 23 April 1969 (aged 69); Fitzroy, Victoria
- Original team: Leopold
- Height: 178 cm (5 ft 10 in)
- Weight: 77 kg (170 lb)

Playing career^{1}
Years	Club	Games (Goals)
1923–1931	South Melbourne	148 (12)
- ^{1} Playing statistics correct to the end of 1931.

Joseph Michael Scanlan (19 March 1900 – 23 April 1969) was an Australian rules footballer who played with South Melbourne in the VFL during the 1920s.

Scanlan was a defender and captained South Melbourne in 1928, 1930 and 1931. He represented Victoria 6 times in interstate football.
