= Tom Quade =

Australian rules footballer

Personal information
- Full name: Thomas Quade
- Born: 17 September 1931; Narrandera, New South Wales
- Died: 14 June 2000 (aged 68)
- Original team: Ariah Park
- Height: 193 cm (6 ft 4 in)
- Weight: 96 kg (212 lb)

Playing career^{1}
Years	Club	Games (Goals)
1957–58	North Melbourne	3 (0)
- ^{1} Playing statistics correct to the end of 1958.

Tom Quade (17 September 1931 – 14 June 2000) was an Australian rules footballer who played with North Melbourne in the Victorian Football League (VFL).
