= Alf Clay =

Australian rules footballer, born 1914

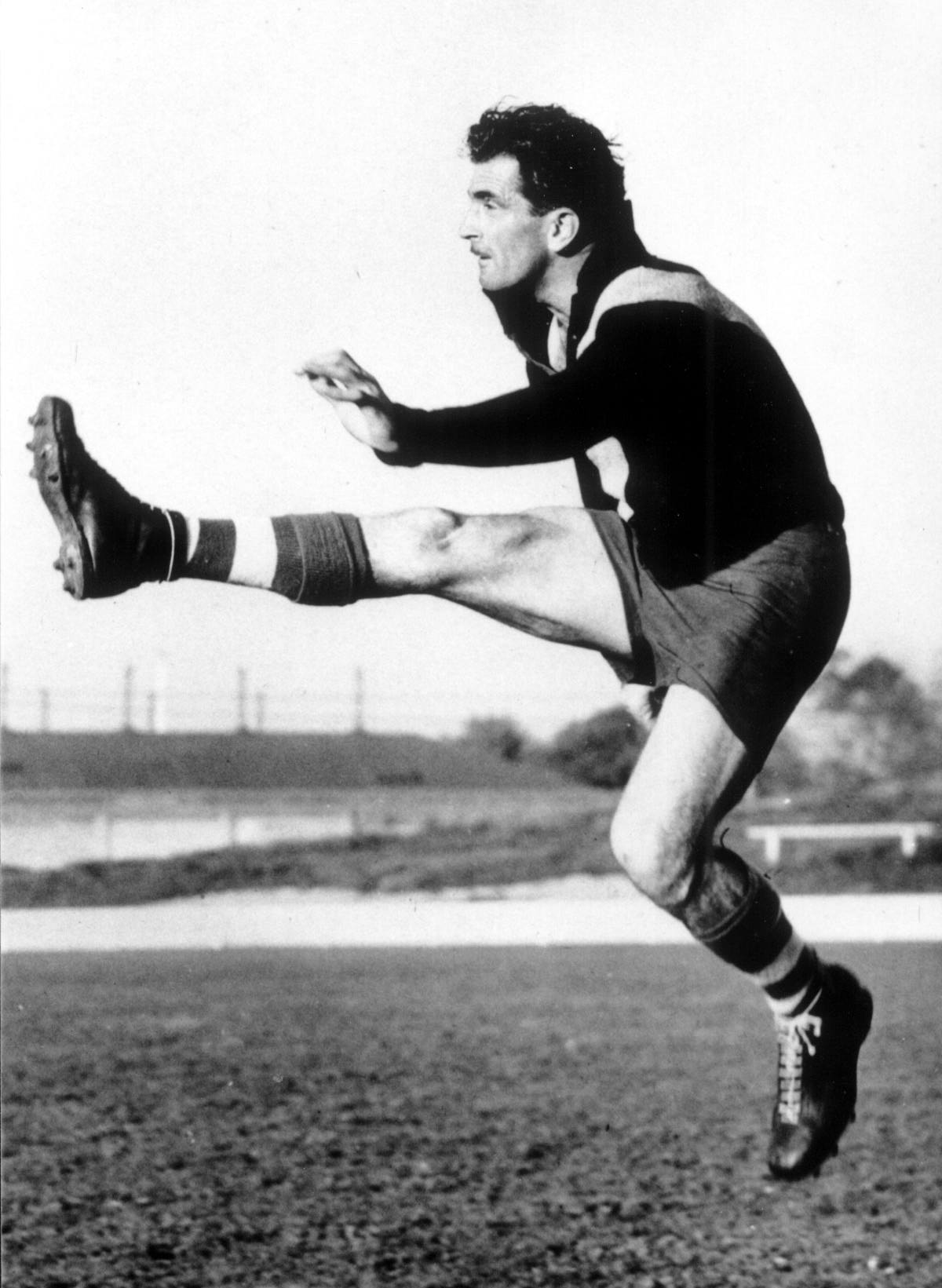

Personal information
- Full name: Alfred Clay
- Born: 8 January 1914; Cape Town, South Africa
- Died: 24 January 1995 (aged 81); Perth, Western Australia
- Original team: Camperdown (HFL)
- Height: 183 cm (6 ft 0 in)
- Weight: 82 kg (181 lb)

Playing career^{1}
Years	Club	Games (Goals)
1937	Hawthorn	3 (2)
1938–1939	Footscray	8 (4)
1940–1944	Fitzroy	41 (17)
1944–1946	North Melbourne	31 (16)
Total		83 (39)
- ^{1} Playing statistics correct to the end of 1946.

Alf Clay (8 January 1914 – 24 January 1995) was an Australian rules footballer who played with Hawthorn, Footscray, Fitzroy and North Melbourne in the Victorian Football League (VFL).

It wasn't until Clay came to Fitzroy that he gained regular senior selection, having been a fringe player at both Hawthorn and Footscray. He kicked four goals on debut for Fitzroy in 1940, against St Kilda at Brunswick Street Oval. After making just five appearances that year, Clay played a total of 35 games in his next three seasons. In 1943 he played in a semi final but missed out on Fitzroy's premiership the following year when he crossed to North Melbourne early in the season.

He was of no relation to the Clay twins, Bert and Ivor, who played for Fitzroy during the time he was at the club.
