= Wagga Football League =

Australian rules football league

- Most recent season or competition: 1956
- Sport: Australian rules football
- Founded: 1894
- Folded: 1956
- No. of teams: 7 (1956), 34 (historical)
- Country: Australia
- Last champion: Temora (1956)
- Related competitions: Albury & District FL

The Wagga Football League was an Australian rules football competition based around the town of Wagga Wagga in southern New South Wales.

== History ==
Australian rules football has been played in Wagga Wagga as far back as 1861, when the Federal club was first formed. It would not be until 1894, however, that the first local competition, consisting of Mechanics and United, would be formed. A year later the number of clubs doubled with the admission of Lake Albert and North Wagga. 1897 saw the first admission of clubs outside Wagga Wagga, with Coolamon and Junee joining. The Association was re-named the Murrumbidgee Football Association but this would only last 1 year, as both new clubs departed after 1897. After only Federals and Mechanics competed in 1898 two new clubs, Newtown and Oldtown, were created and admitted, along with Lake Albert. This line-up of clubs would remain mostly consistent for the next 15 years. Federals re-joined in 1904, while Lake Albert folded after 1908. The Rock joined for the first time in 1912 and in 1914 became the first club from outside Wagga to win the premiership by defeating Newtown. The Wagga FA entered recess in 1916 due to WWI.

The WFA was re-established in 1919 with two new Wagga clubs - Royal Stars and Wagga Lilies - replacing Newtown and Oldtown. Mangoplah and Yerong Creek also joined for the first time, with the former winning their first of 6 Wagga FA premierships. By 1922, Yerong Creek, The Rock and Wagga Lilies had all departed and it was decided to form a competition known as the Riverina Main Line Football Association, comprising clubs along the Sydney-Melbourne railway line from Wagga Wagga to Culcairn. This competition would only last a season due to a number of forfeits and general disorganization.

Prior to the 1925 season, the Wagga FA would undergo a schism, with the two Wagga-based clubs Federals and Royal Stars splitting from the rest of the clubs based in outlying towns. The town clubs would form their own competition, joined by The Gap and a re-formed Newtown. 1926 saw the country clubs leave to re-form The Rock & District FA, leaving the town competition as the only Wagga FA in existence. Although the 1928 season saw Mangoplah, The Rock, Uranquinty and Yeron Creek re-join the WFA, they would all depart for The Rock & District FA a year later, forcing the Wagga FA into a two-year recess.

The competition was re-established in 1931 with Lake Albert, Collingullie, North Wagga Stars, Wagga Wonders and Wagga (formerly Federals) the competing clubs. Uranquinty replaced Lake Albert in 1932, while Euberta played one season in 1933. The disbanding of the South West District Football League saw Coolamon join in 1937 and Ganmain in 1938, although both would depart for the 1939 season. 1937 also saw Junee and Marrar join. The Wagga FA would again enter recess between 1942 and 1945, this time due to World War II.

The WFA was re-established as the Wagga Football League in 1946, with new clubs Forest Hill (RAAF), Kapooka (Army) and Gumly joining Junee, Marrar, Uranquinty, Wagga, North Wagga and Marrar. The 1946 grand final was initially draw, with Junee narrowly defeating North Wagga in the replay. Ganmain joined in 1947, however their departure to the SWDFL in 1949, along with Marrar and Junee, left the Wagga FL with only four clubs in 1949. It was decided to enter recess in 1950 as a result. The return of Junee and Marrar in 1953 allowed for the re-establishment of the WFL, re-named the Wagga Sunday Football League. Wagga departed for the Albury & District FL in 1955 and were replaced by Temora. 1956 would be the final year of the WSFL, with the 7 clubs splitting amongst the Central Riverina and Albury & District leagues in 1957.

== Clubs ==
=== Final ===
Club	Colours	Nickname	Home Ground	Former league	Est.	Years in WFA	WFA Senior Premierships		Fate
Club	Colours	Nickname	Home Ground	Former league	Est.	Years in WFA	Total	Years	Fate
Army (Kapooka 1946)		Cats	Kapooka Army Base Oval, Kapooka	–	1946	1946, 1953-1956	0	-	Recess between 1947-52. Joined Central Riverina FL in 1957
East Wagga (Gumly Gumly 1946-49)		Maroons	Gumly Oval, Gumly Gumly	–	1946	1946-1949, 1953-1956	1	1949	Recess between 1950-52 and 1957-58. Re-formed in Central Riverina FL in 1959
Junee	(1937-41)(1946-56)	Bulldogs	Laurie Daley Oval, Junee	SWDFL	1890s	1897, 1923, 1937-1941, 1946-1948, 1953-1956	4	1939, 1946, 1947, 1954	Recess in 1898, joined Ganmain & District FA in 1899. Returned to South West District FL in 1924 and 1949. Joined Albury & District FL in 1957
Marrar	(1937-40)(1946-56)	Bombers, Redlegs	Langtry Oval, Marrar	R&DFA, SWDFL	1918	1937-1940, 1946-1948, 1953-1956	2	1940, 1953	Recess in 1941. Moved to South West District FL in 1949. Joined Albury & District FL in 1957
North Wagga Stars	(1931-40)(1946-56)	Stars	McPherson Oval, North Wagga Wagga	–	1931	1931-1940, 1946-1949, 1953-1956	1	1935	Merged with Wagga in 1941. Recess between 1950-52. Merged with North Wagga Saints to form North Wagga in Albury & District FL in 1957
RAAF (Forest Hill 1946-48)		Blues	RAAF Base Oval, Forest Hill	A&DFL	1946	1946-1949, 1953-1956	0	-	Moved to Albury & District FL reserve grade in 1950. Joined Central Riverina FL in 1957
Temora		Kangaroos	Nixon Park, Temora	AP&DFA	1900s	1955-1956	2	1955, 1956	Joined Central Riverina FL in 1957

=== Former ===
Club	Colours	Nickname	Home Ground	Former league	Est.	Years in WFA	WFA Senior Premierships		Fate
Club	Colours	Nickname	Home Ground	Former league	Est.	Years in WFA	Total	Years	Fate
Collingullie		Blues, Rovers	Crossroads Oval, Collingullie	TR&DFL	1906	1931-1934, 1936-1938, 1940	0	-	Played in The Rock & District FL in 1935. Recess in 1939 and 1941. Joined Milbrulong & District FL in 1946
Cookardinia			Cookardinia Sports Ground, Cookardinia	YC&DFA, TR&DFL	1890s	1924, 1928	0	-	Recess in 1925. Joined The Rock & District FL in 1926 and 1929
Coolamon		Hoppers	Kindra Park, Coolamon	G&DFA, SWDFL	1894	1897, 1937-1938, 1941	1	1937	Returned to Ganmain & District FA in 1898. Played in South West District FL in 1939-40. Joined Coolamon & District FA in 1945
Cootamundra-RAAF				–	1941	1941	0	-	Folded after 1941 season
Culcairn			Culcairn Sportsground, Culcairn	C&DFA	1895	1922	0	-	Moved to Yerong Creek & District FA in 1923
Euberta				CFA		1933	0	-	Folded after 1933 season
Eunonyhareenyba				–	1910	1910	0	-	Folded after 1910 season
Ganmain		Maroons	Ganmain Sports Ground, Ganmain	SWDFL	1893	1938, 1947-1948	2	1938, 1948	Returned to South West District FL in 1939 and 1949
Henty		Swans, Swampies	Henty Showground, Henty	C&DFA	1895	1922	0	-	Moved to Yerong Creek & District FA in 1923
Half-Holiday			Wagga Wagga Cricket Ground, Wagga Wagga	–	1896	1896	0	-	Folded after 1896 season
Lake Albert			Apex Park, Lake Albert	–	1895	1895-1896, 1899-1900, 1902-1908, 1931	1	1895	Recesses in 1897-98, 1901 and 1909-30. Folded after 1931 season
Mangoplah		Goannas	Mangoplah Sports Ground, Mangoplah	YC&DFA, TR&DFL, A&DFL	1913	1919-1922, 1924-1925, 1928, 1934-1936, 1941	6	1919, 1925, 1928, 1934, 1936, 1941	Played in Yerong Creek & District FA in 1923. Played in The Rock & District FL between 1926-27 and 1929-33. Played in Albury & District FL between 1937-40, returned there in 1946.
Mechanics			Wagga Wagga Cricket Ground, Wagga Wagga	–	1890s	1894-1895, 1897-1899	1	1898	Recess in 1896. Folded after 1899 season
Newtown (1)	(1899-?)(1925)	Blues	Wagga Wagga Cricket Ground, Wagga Wagga	WFA (1925)	1899	1899-1900, 1902-1915, 1921-1922, 1926-1928	2	1900, 1926	Recess in 19801, 1916-20 and 1923-24. Re-formed in Wagga FA (1925) in 1925. Folded after 1928 season
Newtown (2) (Wagga Wonders 1931-32)		Wonders	Wagga Wagga Cricket Ground, Wagga Wagga	–	1930	1931-1935	1	1931	Folded after 1935 season
North Wagga (1)				–	1895	1895-1896	0	-	Folded after 1896 season
Oldtown (1)	(1899-?)(1909)		Wagga Wagga Cricket Ground, Wagga Wagga	–	1899	1899-1900, 1902-1915	8	1899, 1902, 1903, 1904, 1907, 1908, 1909, 1915	Recess in 1901. Folded after 1915 season
Oldtown (2)			Wagga Wagga Cricket Ground, Wagga Wagga	–	1926	1926	0	-	Folded after 1926 season
Rovers			Bolton Park, Wagga Wagga	–	1927	1927	1	1927	Folded after 1927 season
Royal Stars		Greens, Stars	Wagga Wagga Cricket Ground, Wagga Wagga	–	1919	1919-1924	3	1920, 1921, 1922	Formed Wagga FA (1925) in 1925
The Rock		Magpies	Victoria Park, The Rock	TR&DFL, YC&DFA	1901	1912-1915, 1919-1920, 1923-1925, 1928	1	1914	Recess in 1916, joined Culcairn Patriotic FA in 1917. Returned to The Rock & District FL in 1921, 1926 and 1929
Tootool			Tootool Recreation Ground, Tootool	L&DFA	1910	1925	0	-	Moved to The Rock & District FL in 1926
United			Wagga Wagga Cricket Ground, Wagga Wagga	–		1894-1895	1	1894	Folded after 1895 season
Uranquinty		Rosellas	Uranquinty Oval, Uranquinty	TR&DFL	1921	1923-1925, 1928, 1932-1934, 1937, 1939-1940, 1946-1947	0	-	Played in The Rock & District FL between 1926-27, 1929-31 and 1936. Recess in 1935, 1938, 1941 and 1948-49. Re-formed in Central Riverina FL in 1950
Wagga (Federals 1896-27)	(1923)(1931-46)(1947-48)(1949-54)	Tigers, Red & Whites	Robertson Oval, Wagga Wagga	WFA (1925), A&DFL	1861	1896-1898, 1904-1915, 1919-1924, 1926-1928, 1931-1941, 1946-1949, 1953-1954	12	1895, 1895, 1905, 1906, 1910, 1911, 1912, 1913, 1923, 1924, 1932, 1933	Recesses in 1899-1901, 1916-18, and 1929-30. Played in Wagga FA (1925) in 1925. Played in Albury & District FL between 1950-52 and returned there in 1955
Wagga Lilies		Lilies	Wagga Wagga Cricket Ground, Wagga Wagga	–	1919	1919-1920	0	-	Folded after 1920 season
Yerong Creek		Blue & Whites	Yerong Creek Sports Ground, Yerong Creek	C&DFA, YC&DFA, TR&DFL	1910	1919, 1922, 1924, 1928	0	-	Recess in 1920, joined Culcairn & District FA in 1921. Formed Yerong Creek & District FA in 1923. Joined Riverina FA in 1925. Returned to The Rock & District FL in 1929

== Premierships ==
Year	Premier	Score	Runners-up	Notes
Wagga FA
1894	United		Mechanics	
1895	Lake Albert	7.9 (51) - 1.5 (11)	Mechanics	
1896	Federals			
Murrumbidgee FA
1897	Federals			
Wagga FA
1898	Mechanics		Federals	
1899	Oldtown	3.6 (24) - 3.4 (22)	Newtown	
1900	Newtown	2.10 (22) - 2.4 (16)	Lake Albert	
1901	Recess			
1902	Oldtown	4.12 (36) - 3.8 (26)	Newtown	
1903	Oldtown	6.6 (42) - 3.5 (23)	Lake Albert	
1904	Oldtown		Newtown	
1905	Federals		Lake Albert	
1906	Federals		Oldtown	
1907	Oldtown	5.11 (41) - 3.9 (27)	Lake Albert	
1908	Oldtown		Newtown	
1909	Oldtown		Federals	
1910	Federals			
1911	Federals			
1912	Federals		Newtown	
1913	Federals	18.12 (120) - 8.9 (57)	The Rock	
1914	The Rock	6.11 (47) - 5.1 (31)	Newtown	
1915	Oldtown	6.4 (40) - 4.8 (32)	Federals	
1916-18	Recess (WWI)			
1919	Mangoplah	5.6 (36) - 3.13 (31)	Royal Stars	
1920	Royal Stars	7.3 (45) - 1.7 (13)	Federals	
1921	Royal Stars	9.8 (62) - 5.6 (36)	Federals	
Riverina Main Line FA
1922	Royal Stars	9.13 (67) - 4.16 (40)	Yerong Creek	
Wagga United FA
1923	Federals	10.8 (68) - 9.13 (61)	Royal Stars	
1924	Federals	?.? (106) - ?.? (74)	Royal Stars	
1925	Mangoplah	9.4 (58) - 3.11 (29)	The Rock	
1926	Newtown	9.7 (61) - 6.10 (46)	Oldtown	
1927	Rovers	?.? (103) - ?.? (18)	Currawarna	
1928	Mangoplah	16.12 (108) - 3.10 (28)	The Rock	
1929-30	Recess			
1931	Wagga Wonders	10.13 (73) - 9.14 (68)	Wagga	
1932	Wagga	9.13 (67) - 8.14 (62)	Wagga Wonders	
1933	Wagga	14.17 (101) - 12.11 (83)	Collingullie	
1934	Mangoplah	19.10 (124) - 6.6 (42)	Newtown	
1935	North Wagga Stars	12.17 (89) - 10.10 (70)	Mangoplah	
1936	Mangoplah	19.14 (128) - 11.16 (82)	Wagga	
1937	Coolamon	5.11 (41) - 5.8 (38)	Marrar	
1938	Ganmain	20.12 (132) - 6.14 (50)	Coolamon	
1939	Junee	15.10 (100) - 10.14 (74)	Wagga	
1940	Marrar	11.9 (75) - 3.6 (24)	Wagga	
1941	Mangoplah	13.9 (85) - 9.15 (69)	Junee	
1942-45	Recess (WWII)			
Wagga FL
1946	Junee	?.? (67) - ?.? (67)	North Wagga Stars	Draw
1946	Junee	10.9 (69) - 8.9 (57)	North Wagga Stars	Replay
1947	Junee	14.12 (96) - 12.17 (89)	Ganmain	
1948	Ganmain	10.9 (69) - 6.10 (46)	Wagga	
1949	Gumly	10.12 (72) - 8.10 (58)	North Wagga Stars	
1950-52	Recess			
Wagga Sunday FL
1953	Marrar	13.9 (87) - 8.6 (54)	Junee	
1954	Junee	10.7 (67) - 9.7 (61)	Marrar	
1955	Temora	5.20 (50) - 7.5 (47)	Junee	
1956	Temora	11.12 (78) - 7.14 (56)	Junee	

== Wagga Football Association (1925) ==
This competition was established when Royal Stars and Federals split from the country clubs prior to the 1925 season. They were joined by a re-established Newtown and The Gap, who played in the Currawarna FA the previous year.

=== Clubs ===
Club	Colours	Nickname	Home Ground	Former league	Est.	Years in WFA	WFA Senior Premierships		Fate
Club	Colours	Nickname	Home Ground	Former league	Est.	Years in WFA	Total	Years	Fate
Federals			Robertson Oval, Wagga Wagga	WFA	1861	1925	1	1925	Returned to Wagga FA in 1926
Newtown		Blues	Wagga Wagga Cricket Ground, Wagga Wagga	WFA	1899	1925	0	-	Returned to Wagga FA in 1926
Royal Stars		Greens, Stars	Wagga Wagga Cricket Ground, Wagga Wagga	WFA	1919	1925	0	-	Folded after 1926 season
The Gap		Magpies		CFA		1925	0	-	Folded after 1926 season

=== Premierships ===
Year	Premier	Score	Runners-up	Notes
1925	Federals	15.15 (105) - 8.20 (68)	Newtown	
