= Westby railway line =

Former railway line in New South Wales

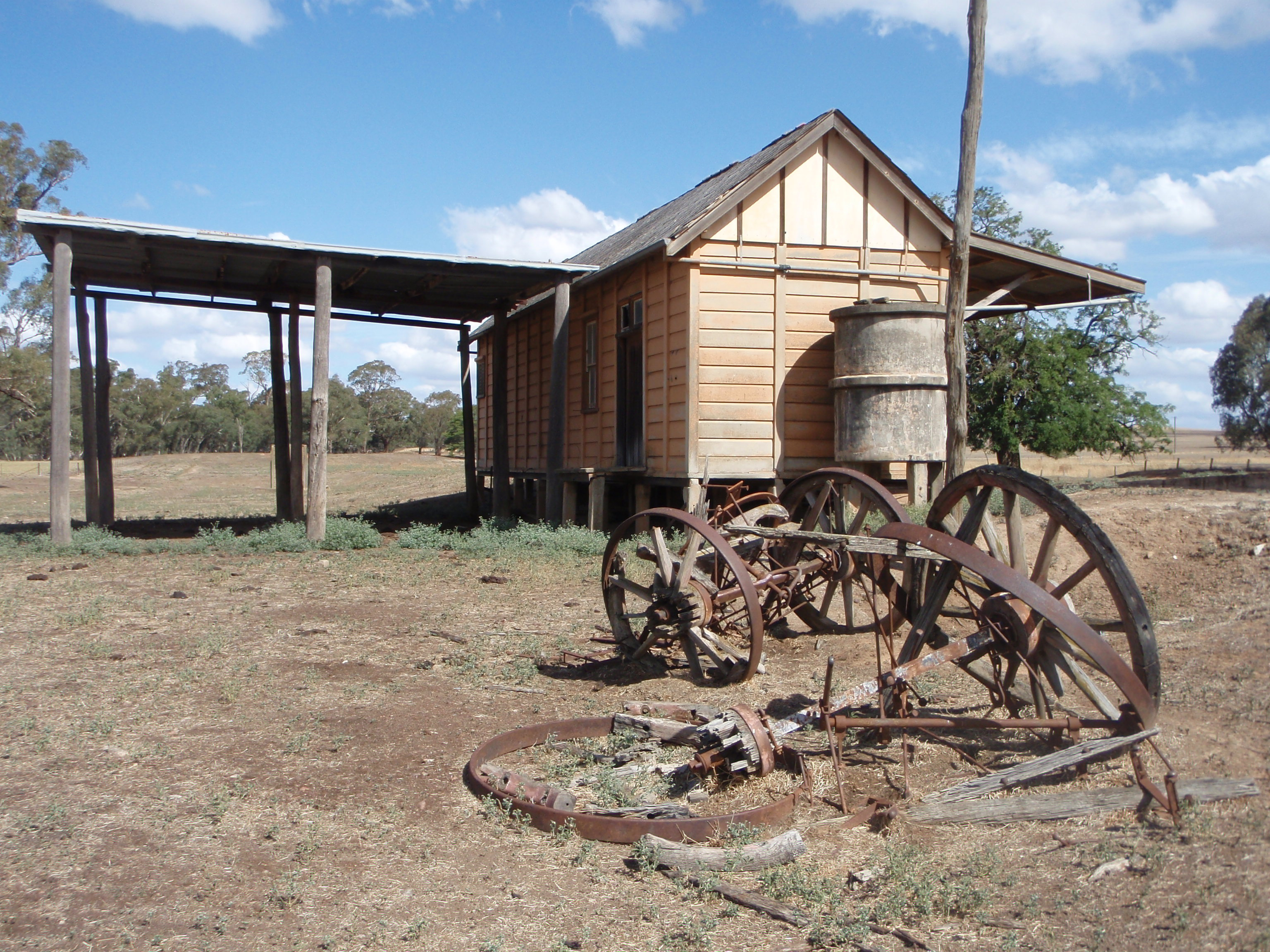
- The remains of Westby railway station in March 2009

Overview
- Other name: Westby Branch
- Status: Closed
- Owner: Department of Railways
- Termini: The Rock; Westby
- Stations: 6

Service
- Type: Regional rail
- Operator: Department of Railways

History
- Opened: 5 August 1925
- Closed: 24 January 1952 (Mangoplah to Westby); 10 July 1956 (The Rock to Mangoplah)

Technical
- Line length: 40 km (25 mi)
- Number of tracks: 1
- Track gauge: 1,435 mm (4 ft 8 1/2 in)

The Westby railway line was a railway line in New South Wales, Australia. The line opened on 5 August 1925 as a branch off the Main South line at The Rock to the small community of Westby, a distance of approximately 40 km.

== Construction ==
Agitation for the construction of the railway goes back to 1911 when the Pulletop Railway League advocated a line from The Rock to Pulletop. Subsequently, the League, when waiting upon the Minister for Lands, sought the line to run as far as Jingellic. Finally, in 1919, The Rock to Pulletop Railway Act was passed.

However, construction did not commence until February, 1923. Whilst the Act had sanctioned the construction only as far as Pulletop, it was continued for a further 5 kilometers to a terminus at Westby.

== Operations ==
Mixed trains were limited to 500 tons and subject to a maximum equivalent length of 45 4-wheeled wagons and goods trains to 900 tons and an equivalent length of 70.

The Down Mixed train, which, in 1949, ran Wednesdays only, connected with the Down Albury Mail and the Up Riverina Express, whilst the Up Mixed connected with the Up Albury Mail and the Down Riverina Express.

Services came to an abrupt halt in January, 1952, when a bushfire destroyed nearly 4,000 sleepers and a timber waterway. The last train to Westby ran on 16 January 1952.

Goods train services were resumed the following wheat season to serve the silo at Mangoplah. Once the wheat was cleared, they ran on an "as required" basis.

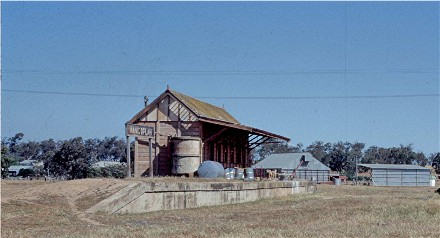
The disused Mangoplah platform in November, 1969

Wheat was again transported by rail from the Mangoplah silo the following three seasons.

== Closure ==
It was formally closed from 10 July 1956, however the Act of Parliament enabling the closure was not passed until 1961, the date being retrospective. The track has been lifted for the entire length of the route. A motel was built on the site of the formation at The Rock.

== See also ==
- Rail transport in New South Wales
