= The Rock & District Football League =

Australian rules football league

- Most recent season or competition: 1940
- Sport: Australian rules football
- Founded: 1910
- Folded: 1940
- No. of teams: 6 (1940), 16 (historical)
- Country: Australia
- Last champion: Osborne (1940)
- Related competitions: Wagga FL; Lockhart & District FL

The Rock & District Football League was an Australian rules football competition based around the town of The Rock in southern New South Wales.

== History ==
The TR&DFL existed in three distinct forms between 1910 and 1940. It was first founded in 1910 with Milbrulong, Tootool, The Rock and Yerong Creek competing. This edition of the league only lasted two seasons and folded when The Rock joined the Wagga FA in 1912. Milbrulong won both premierships.

The TR&DFL was re-established in 1921 following The Rock's departure from the Wagga FA. New clubs established at Collingullie, French Park and Uranquinty all joined the League along with The Rock Railway club. This edition of the League would again last only two seasons and folded after The Rock returned to the Wagga FA along with Uranquinty.

The timeline of the TR&DFL continued to be interspersed with the Wagga FA during its third and final period of existence. Following the schism of the WFA in 1925, the country-based clubs left to re-form the TR&DFL in 1926. The League entered recess again in 1928 when 5 of the 6 clubs moved to the Wagga FA, but was re-established a year later when football in Wagga collapsed. In 1930 the competition was boosted further with the additions of Osborne, Pleasant Hills and Tootool-Milbrulong from the defunct Lockhart & District FL. Lockhart and new club Mittagong joined in 1932 to replace Cookardinia, Tootool-Milbrulong (although Milbrulong would return a year later) and Uranquinty. The 1933 grand final between Lockhart and Mangoplah had to be abandoned due to a large fight between players and supporters. Mangoplah won the replay but departed for the Wagga FA a year later. The Rock left after the 1937 season, leaving only 5 clubs in the TR&DFL. The 1938 grand final between Osborne and Milbrulong was drawn, with Osborne winnign the replay a week later. Due to the departure of The Rock the TR&DFL changed its name to the Lockhart & District FL for the 1940 season. This only lasted 1 year as the League entered recess due to WWII in 1941 and did not re-form after the war.

== Clubs ==
=== Final ===
Club	Colours	Nickname	Home Ground	Former league	Est.	Years in TR&DFL	TR&DFL Senior Premierships		Fate
Club	Colours	Nickname	Home Ground	Former league	Est.	Years in TR&DFL	Total	Years	Fate
Boree Creek		Magpies, Creekers	Boree Creek Recreation Ground, Boree Creek	F&DFA	1886	1940	0	–	Joined Milbrulong & District FL in 1946
Greenvale				F&DFA	1920	1940	0	–	Folded after 1940 season
Lockhart			Lockhart Recreation Ground, Lockhart	L&DFA	1898	1932-1940	2	1934, 1935	Formed Milbrulong & District FL in 1945
Milbrulong (Tootool-Milbrulong 1930-31)		Maroons	Milbrulong Recreation Ground, Milbrulong	UFA, L&DFA		1910-1911, 1926–1927, 1930–1931, 1933–1940	4	1910, 1911, 1930, 1939	Moved to Lockhart & District FA in 1912. Recess in 1928 and 1933. Formed Milbrulong & District FL in 1945
Osborne		Tigers	Osborne Recreation Reserve, Osborne	L&DFA	1901	1930-1940	2	1937, 1938	Formed Milbrulong & District FL in 1945
Pleasant Hills			Pleasant Hills Recreation Reserve, Pleasant Hills	L&DFA		1930-1934, 1938–1940	0	–	Recess between 1935–37 and 1945–47. Joined Milbrulong & District FL in 1948

=== Former ===
Club	Colours	Nickname	Home Ground	Former league	Est.	Years in TR&DFL	TR&DFL Senior Premierships		Fate
Club	Colours	Nickname	Home Ground	Former league	Est.	Years in TR&DFL	Total	Years	Fate
Collingullie		Blues	Crossroads Oval, Collingullie	WFA	1906	1921-1922, 1935	0	–	Recess between 1923 and 1930, re-formed in Wagga FA in 1931. Returned there in 1936
Cookardinia	Dark with light vee		Cookardinia Sportsground, Cookardinia	WFA		1926-1927, 1929–1931	0	–	Played in Wagga FA in 1928. Recess in 1932–33. Re-formed in Albury & District FA in 1934
French Park				–	1921	1921-1922	1	1922	Folded after 1922 season
Mangoplah		Goannas	Mangoplah Sports Ground, Mangoplah	WFA	1913	1926-1927, 1929–1933	5	1926, 1927, 1929, 1931, 1933	Played in Wagga FA in 1928, returned there in 1934
Mittagong		Greens	Mittagong Recreation Ground, Yerong Creek	–	1932	1932-1937	0	–	Recess between 1938 and 1944, re-formed in Milbrulong & District FL in 1945
Railway			Victoria Park, The Rock	–	1921	1921-1922	0	–	Folded after 1922 season
The Rock		Magpies	Victoria Park, The Rock	L&DFA, WFA	1901	1910-1911, 1921–1922, 1926–1927, 1929–1937	3	1921, 1932, 1936	Moved to Wagga FA in 1912, 1923 and 1928. Recess in 1938, re-formed in Albury & District FA in 1939
Tootool			Tootool Recreation Ground, Tootool	WFA	1910	1910-1911, 1926	0	–	Recess in 1912–13, re-formed in Milbrulong & District FA in 1914. Recess in 1927, re-formed in Urangeline FA in 1928
Uranquinty		Rosellas	Uranquinty Oval, Uranquinty	WFA	1921	1921-1922, 1926–1927, 1929–1931, 1936	0	–	Moved to Wagga FA in 1923, 1928, 1932 and 1937
Yerong Creek		Blue & Whites	Yerong Creek Sports Ground, Yerong Creek	WFA	c.1910s	1910-1911, 1926–1927, 1929–1939	0	–	Recess in 1912–13, formed Yerong Creek & District FA in 1914. Played in Wagga FA in 1928. Recess between 1940 and 1945, re-formed in Milbrulong & District FL in 1946.

== Premierships ==
Year	Premier	Score	Runners-up	Notes
The Rock & District Football League
1910	Milbrulong		Yerong Creek	
1911	Milbrulong			
1912-20	Recess			
1921	The Rock	Margin 8 points	Collingullie	
1922	French Park	5.11 (41) - 4.4 (28)	Railway	
1923-25	Recess			
1926	Mangoplah	8.10 (58) - 6.9 (45)	Tootool	
1927	Mangoplah		The Rock	
1928	Recess			
1929	Mangoplah	11.8 (71) - 5.5 (35)	Uranquinty	
1930	Tootol-Milbrulong	10.16 (76) - 9.16 (70)	Osborne	
1931	Mangoplah	15.25 (115) - 12.8 (80)	Cookardinia	
1932	The Rock	7.13 (55) - 6.12 (48)	Mangoplah	
1933	Mangoplah	18.17 (125) - 12.14 (86)	Lockhart	Replay - original grand final abandoned due to violence
1934	Lockhart	9.13 (67) - 9.12 (66)	The Rock	
1935	Lockhart	Margin 12 points	Milbrulong	
1936	The Rock	7.10 (52) - 6.7 (43)	Lockhart	
1937	Osborne	8.23 (71) - 5.9 (39)	The Rock	
1938	Osborne	8.11 (59) - 8.11 (59)	Milbrulong	Draw
1938	Osborne	9.13 (67) - 9.11 (65)	Milbrulong	Replay
1939	Milbrulong	8.17 (65) - 6.13 (49)	Osborne	
Lockhart & District Football Association
1940	Osborne	14.15 (99) - 11.7 (73)	Greenvale	
