= Nathon Irvin =

Australian rules footballer (born 1973)

Personal information
- Full name: Nathon John Irvin
- Born: 31 January 1973 (age 53); Wagga Wagga, New South Wales
- Original team: Mangoplah (FFL)
- Height: 189 cm (6 ft 2 in)
- Weight: 83 kg (183 lb)

Playing career^{1}
Years	Club	Games (Goals)
1993	Sydney Swans	1 (0)
1994 & 1996	Norwood	32 (22)
1997–2000	Sturt	48 (27)
2001–2002	Glenelg	14 (11)
Total		95 (60)
- ^{1} Playing statistics correct to the end of 1993.

Nathon Irvin (born 31 January 1973) is a former Australian rules footballer who played with the Sydney Swans in the Australian Football League (AFL).

== Biography ==
Born in Wagga Wagga, Irvin came to the Swans' attention while playing for played for Mangoplah Football Club in the Farrer Football League

A defender, Irvin played just one senior AFL game for the Swans, against Hawthorn in round two of the 1993 AFL season. In the 1994 National Draft he was secured by Footscray, but after breaking his leg in a pre-season match, would not make any league appearances for the club.

He played for three South Australian National Football League clubs, first Norwood, followed by Sturt and then Glenelg. In 2003, he joined the Wagga Tigers, which he would both captain and coach from 2003 to 2005.

Irvin later coached Mangoplah from 2012 to 2014 and again in 2016.
