= Albury & District Football League =

Australian Rules football league

The Albury & District Football League was established at a delegates meeting in Culcairn in 1930 from the following Australian Rules Football clubs – Albury Rovers, Culcairn, Henty and Holbrook and folded after the 1957 football season.

== History ==
The Albury & District Football League was established at a delegates meeting in Culcairn in 1930 from the following Australian Rules Football clubs – Albury Rovers, Culcairn, Henty and Holbrook. The first season saw 12 games played, plus semi finals and a grand final which was won by Henty.

Brocklesby had a famous grand final victory over Henty to win the 1939 Albury & District Football League premiership after Wally Crooks kicked a goal after the siren, from a free kick to win by two points, under captain / coach, Jim Steigenberger. Henty then lodged an appeal to the Albury & DFL, which was defeated then appealed to the Murray District Football Council, which was then upheld, awarding the premiership to Henty. Brocklesby then appealed that decision to the Victorian Country Football League, which was up held, allowing Brocklesby to finally be declared the 1939 premiers. Brocklesby's full forward, Shadrach "Shady" James kicked 82 goals in the home and away series plus 16 goals in the finals, for a total of 98 goals in 17 games in 1939.

In August 1943, Mr. A D S Vivian, the league's foundation president from 1930 to 1935 died in Sydney. Vivian was the driving force behind the Albury Rovers FC and a former club president too. He was the vice president of the NSW branch of the National Football League.

In 1950 the Albury & District Football League introduced a Reserve Grade Competition,

North Melbourne visited Bolton Park, Wagga in 1952 and defeated a combined Albury & DFL side, with North's Jock Spencer kicking 18 goals.

The 1952 A&DFL Reserves competition was divided into two division – North (Wagga) and South (Albury).

Culcairn's Henry "Splinter" Liston kicked 91 goals in the 1953 home and away series, plus 8 more in the finals, to finish on 99 goals!

In June 1954 the Albury & DFL played an inter-league match against the South Western DFL at Wagga, resulting in a win to Albury & DFL, 12.20 – 92 to 10.7 – 67.

Culcairn's Henry "Splinter" Liston kicked 102 goals in 1954, which included the finals series.

In 1955, Ron Clegg was captain-coach of the North Wagga Football Club in the Albury & DFL, winning the £50 – Border Mail Newspaper / Albury & DFL Footballer of the Year Award, before returning to South Melbourne in 1956.

In 1957 the Farrer Football League was first formed as a breakaway from the Albury & District Football League. Culcairn, Henty, Holbrook and Mangoplah-Cookardinia United competed in the first season. In 1958 all remaining clubs from the Albury & District Football League moved across to the Farrer Football League.

== Clubs ==
=== Final ===
Club	Jumper	Nickname	Home Ground	Former league	Est.	Years in A&DFL	A&DFL Senior Premierships		Fate
Club	Jumper	Nickname	Home Ground	Former league	Est.	Years in A&DFL	Total	Years	Fate
Junee		Bulldogs	Laurie Daley Oval, Junee	WSFL	1919	1957	0	-	Moved to Farrer FL following 1957 season
Lockhart		Bombers	Lockhart Recreation Ground, Lockhart	CRFL	1898	1957	0	-	Moved to Farrer FL following 1957 season
North Wagga		Saints	McPherson Oval, North Wagga Wagga	–	1957	1957	0	-	Moved to Farrer FL following 1957 season
The Rock	(1939)(1948)	Magpies	Victoria Park, The Rock	TR&DFL, CRFL	1901	1939-1940, 1948-1957	0	-	Played in Central Riverina FL between 1945-47. Moved to Farrer FL following 1957 season
Wagga		Tigers	Robertson Oval, Wagga Wagga	WSFL	1928	1949-1957	1	1957	Moved to Farrer FL following 1957 season
Yerong Creek		Blue & Whites	Yerong Creek Sports Ground, Yerong Creek	CRFL	c.1910s	1956-1957	0	-	Moved to Farrer FL following 1957 season

=== Former ===
Club	Jumper	Nickname	Home Ground	Former league	Est.	Years in A&DFL	A&DFL Senior Premierships		Fate
Club	Jumper	Nickname	Home Ground	Former league	Est.	Years in A&DFL	Total	Years	Fate
Albury Rovers		Rovers		T&DFA, C&DFA	1926	1930-1937, 1946	1	1933	Played in Chiltern & District FA between 1938-40. Merged with East Albury to form East Albury Rovers following 1946 season
Brocklesby		Kangaroos	Brocklesby Recreation Reserve, Brocklesby	C&DFL, CHFA	1907	1931-1932, 1935-1940	1	1939	Played in Central Hume FA between 1933-34. Moved to Hume FL following WWII
Cookardinia	Dark with light vee		Cookardinia Sportsground, Cookardinia	TR&DFL		1934-1954	0	-	Merged with Mangoplah to form Mangoplah-Cookardinia United following 1954 season
Culcairn		Lions	Culcairn Sportsground, Culcairn	RFA	1895	1930-1956	3	1952, 1953, 1954	Formed Farrer FL following 1956 season
East Albury Rovers				–	1947	1947	0	-	Moved to Hume FL following 1947 season
Henty		Swans, Swampies	Henty Showground, Henty	RFA	1895	1930-1956	3	1930, 1935, 1937	Formed Farrer FL following 1956 season
Holbrook		Brookers	Holbrook Sports Complex, Holbrook	RFA	1882	1930-1956	5	1931, 1932, 1934, 1951, 1955	Formed Farrer FL following 1956 season
Mangoplah		Goannas	Mangoplah Sports Ground, Mangoplah	WFA	1913	1937-1940, 1946-1954	7	1938, 1940, 1946, 1947, 1948, 1949, 1950	Played in Wagga FA in 1941. Merged with Cookardinia to form Mangoplah-Cookardinia United following 1954 season
Mangoplah-Cookardinia United		Goannas	Mangoplah Sports Ground, Mangoplah	–	1955	1955-1956	1	1956	Formed Farrer FL following 1956 season
Marrar		Bombers	Langtry Oval, Marrar	SWDFL	1918	1953, 1955-1956	0	-	Moved to Wagga Sunday FL in 1954. Moved to Central Riverina FL following 1956 season
North Wagga Saints		Saints	McPherson Oval, North Wagga Wagga	–	1948	1948-1954	0	-	Recess in 1955-56. Merged with North Wagga Stars to form North Wagga following 1956 season
RAAF		Blues	RAAF Base Oval, Forest Hill	WFA	1946	1950	0	-	Recess in 1951-52, re-formed in Wagga Sunday FL in 1953
Rand		Pigeons	Rand Recreation Reserve, Rand	A&DFL	1925	1939-1940	0	-	Moved to Hume FL following WWII
St Patricks (Albury CYMS 1934)				–	1934	1934-1936	0	-	Folded in April 1937
Turvey Park		Bulldogs	Maher Oval, Wagga Wagga	–	1954	1954	0	-	Moved to Central Riverina FL following 1954 season
Woomargama-Mullengandra			Woomargama Cricket Oval, Woomargama	–	1948	1948	0	-	Folded after 1948 season

== Grand Finals ==
Seniors

Year	Premiers	Score	Runners up	Score	Captain	Coach	Venue	Gate	Premiership Cup
1930	Henty	14.12 – 96	Holbrook	8.14 – 62			Culcairn		Kennedy Gold Cup
1931	Holbrook	13.11 – 89	Brocklesby	5.7 – 37	Cec Field		Culcairn		Kennedy Memorial Cup
1932	Holbrook	9.11 – 65	Albury Rovers	8.10 – 58			Culcairn		Kennedy Memorial Cup
1933	Albury Rovers	16.12 – 108	Henty	9.10 – 64	Charlie Kolb	Charlie Kolb	Albury Showgrounds	£40	Kennedy Memorial Cup
1934	Holbrook	10.11 – 71	Albury Rovers	7.14 – 56			Culcairn	£55	Kennedy Memorial Cup
1935	Henty	18.14 – 122	Holbrook	18.12 – 120	W W Paech	W W Paech	Culcairn	£67	Ballarat Brewery Cup
1936	Culcairn	12.13 – 85	Henty	11.13 – 79	Jack Clarke	Jack Clarke	Cookardinia	£56	
1937	Henty	14.12 – 96	Mangoplah	11.10 – 76	W W Paech	W W Paech	Culcairn	£127	Shugg Cup
1938	Mangoplah	20.10 – 130	Culcairn	12.11 – 83	Russell Madden	Russell Madden	Henty	£120	Mackie Cup
1939	Brocklesby	14.10 – 94	Henty	13.14 – 92	Jim Steigenberger	Jim Steigenberger	Culcairn		
1940	Mangoplah	16.18 – 114	Culcairn	13.13 – 78	Ray Roberson	Ray Roberson	Cookardinia		Mrs F A Parker Cup
1941-5									In recess – WW2
1946	Mangoplah	12.13 – 85	Culcairn	9.20 – 74	Allan Klimpsch	Ray Roberson	Henty	£184	
1947	Mangoplah	16.11 – 107	Holbrook	14.10 – 94	Ray Roberson	Ray Roberson	Culcairn	£204	
1948	Mangoplah	18.13 – 121	The Rock	11.18 – 84	Ray Roberson	Ray Roberson	Culcairn	£169	Cannon Cup
1949	Mangoplah	14.15 – 99	Wagga	9.18 – 72	Allan Klimpsch	Allan Klimpsch	Culcairn	£394	Cannon Cup
1950	Mangoplah	12.9 – 81	Holbrook	11.11 – 77	Allan Klimpsch	Allan Klimpsch	The Rock	£406	Cannon Cup
1951	Holbrook	12.9 – 81	Culcairn	9.8 – 62			Mangoplah	£400	
1952	Culcairn	8.20 – 68	Wagga	9.9 – 63	Ted Hill	Ted Hill	Mangoplah	£499	
1953	Culcairn	8.13 – 61	Wagga	6.9 – 45	Frank O'Leary	Frank O'Leary	The Rock	£777	
1954	Culcairn	19.30 – 144	Wagga	4.9 – 33	Frank O'Leary	Frank O'Leary	Henty	£650	
1955	Holbrook	11.9 – 75	M C U	8.9 – 57	Stan Rule	Stan Rule	Culcairn		
1956	M C U	12.11 – 83	The Rock	7.13 – 55	Bill Byrne	Bill Byrne			
1957	Wagga	14.14 – 98	The Rock	5.12 – 42					

- MCU – Mangoplah Cookardinia United FC
- Cannon Cup: Donated by John Cannon from the Culcairn Hotel.

Most Senior Premierships / Runners Up

Club	Most Premierships	Runners up
Mangoplah	7	2
Holbrook	5	4
Culcairn	4	4
Henty	3	3
Albury Rovers	1	2
Brocklesby	1	1
M C U	1	1
Wagga	1	4
The Rock		2
Totals	23	23

Reserves

The Albury & DFL Reserves competition ran from 1950 to 1957.

Year	Premiers	Score	Runners up	Score	Captain	Coach	Venue	Gate	Premiership Cup
1950	RAAF Blues	11.12 – 78	Henty	4.11 – 35					
1951	Holbrook								
1952	Marrar	105	Army	66					
1953	Culcairn	v	Holbrook						Unsure who won 2nds G Final
1954	Turvey Park	8.12 – 60	Culcairn	4.8 – 32					
1955	Culcairn	11.4 – 70	M C U	7.10 – 52					
1956	Wagga	3.17 – 35	Culcairn	4.6 – 30					
1957	Wagga	d	The Rock						

== League Best & Fairest Award ==
- In 1932, Mr. D M Stavley of Wodonga donated a medal for the best and fairest player to be decided on by the umpires votes.
- The Carlton Brewery Medal was first donated in 1936.
- The Baz Medal was first donated in 1952 by Mr. Mick Baz of Culcairn.

Year	Winner	Club	Votes	Runner up	Club	Votes
1930	no record of award					
1931	no record of award					
	Stavley Gold Medal					
1932	W Carroll	Culcairn				
1933	Charlie Kolb	Albury Rovers				
1934	Dinny Ryan	Albury Rovers				
1935	Tom Eames	Albury Rovers				
	Carlton Brewery Medal					
1936	Ron Nolan	Cookardinia		Bert Clarke	Brocklesby	
1937	Merv Cooper	Mangoplah	31	Vin Smith	Brocklesby	22
1938	Jim Kendall	Holbrook	27	Merv Cooper	Mangoplah	22
	Albert Bert Clay *	Henty	(27)	Vin Smith	Brocklesby	22
1939	Albert Bert Clay	Henty	21	Jim Kendall	Holbrook	19
1940	A R "Ray" Roberson	Mangoplah				
1941-5						In recess WW2
1946	Alan Papworth	Culcairn		Charlie Craig	Cookardinia	
1947	Charlie Craig	Cookardinia	17	G Bedggood	Henty	15
1948	J Mullarvey	Woomargrama				
1949	Brian Brennan	Holbrook				
1950	Des Donkin	The Rock	16	H Clark	Mangoplah	15
	Brian Brennan *	Holbrook	(16)	Charlie Craig	Cookardinia	15
1951	Jim Stockton	North Wagga	29	Brian Brennan &	Holbrook	18
				Ron Bunyan	Cookardinia	18
	Baz Medal					
1952	Ron Bunyan	Cookardinia	26			
	Tim Robb *	The Rock	(26)			
1953	Merv Pieper	North Wagga		Tim Robb	The Rock	
1954	Harry Gardiner	Culcairn	16	Neale Rutzou &	Wagga	14
				Sid Ruhe	Henty	14
1955	Len Wornes	Holbrook	20	Ron Bunyan	M C U	17
1956	Hayden Hensel	Culcairn				
1957	E Feeney	The Rock				

- 1938 – Albert Clay (Henty) lost on a count back.
- 1950 – Brian Brennan (Holbrook) lost on a count back.
- 1952 – Tim Robb (The Rock) lost on a count back.

== VFL Players ==
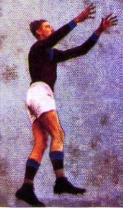
Dinny Ryan, 1935 Brownlow Medalist

The following footballers from the Albury & DFL went onto to play senior VFL football, with the year indicating their VFL debut.

- 1935 – Dinny Ryan – Albury Rovers to Fitzroy
- 1940 – Albert Clay – Henty to Fitzroy
- 1940 – Shadrach "Shady" James – Brocklesby to Fitzroy
- 1941 – Ivor Clay – Henty to Fitzroy
- 1950 – Neale Rutzou – Wagga to Fitzroy
- 1957 – Percy Appleyard – Culcairn to South Melbourne
- 1957 – Bill Byrne – Mangoplah / Cookardinia United to Melbourne, and Wagga Wagga.

== Office Bearers ==
Year	President	Secretary	Treasurer
1930	A D S Vivian	Gordon Davidson	A Smith
1931	A D S Vivian	Gordon Davidson	Gordon Davidson
1932	A D S Vivian	Gordon Davidson	Gordon Davidson
1933	A D S Vivian	Gordon Davidson	Gordon Davidson
1934	A D S Vivian	Gordon Davidson	Gordon Davidson
1935	A D S Vivian	Gordon Davidson	Gordon Davidson
1936	G A Gray	Gordon Davidson	Gordon Davidson
1937	T E Kendall	Gordon Davidson	Gordon Davidson
1938	T E Kendall	Gordon Davidson	Gordon Davidson
1940	T E Kendall	Gordon Davidson	Gordon Davidson
1941-5			In recess – WW2
1946	J J Newman	Gordon Davidson	Gordon Davidson
1947	J J Newman	Alan F Fifield	L Wilksch
1948	David Cox	Alan F Fifield	L Wilksch
1949	David Cox	Alan F Fifield	L Wilksch
1950	David Cox	Alan F Fifield	L Wilksch
1951	David Cox	Alan F Fifield	L Wilksch
1952	David Cox	Alan F Fifield	L Wilksch
1953	David Cox	Alan F Fifield	L Wilksch
1954	David Cox	Alan F Fifield	L Wilksch
1955			
1956			
1957			

== Links ==
- 1930 to 1956 – Albury & District Football League Premierships & Best & Fairest Lists
- 1937 – Albury & DFL Premiers: Henty FC team photo
- 1938 – Albury & DFL team: Holbrook FC team photo
- 1939 – Albury & DFL team: Rand FC team photo
- 1939 – Mangoplah FC & The Rock FC team photos
- 1939 – Albury & DFL semi final team: Brocklesby FC team photo
- 1939 – Albury & DFL semi Final team: Henty FC team photo
- 1940 – Albury & DFL Premiers: Mangoplah FC team photo
- 1947 – Albury & DFL team: Cookardinia FC team photo
- 1947 – Albury & DFL team: Culcairn FC team photo
- 1947 – Albury & DFL Runners Up: Holbrook FC team photo
- 1948 – Albury & DFL grand final teams: Mangoplah FC & The Rock FC team photos
- 1949 – Albury & DFL Premiers: Mangoplah FC team photo
- 1950 – Albury & DFL Runners Up: Holbrook FC team photo
- 1951 – Albury & DFL Premiers: Holbrook FC team photo
- 1951 – Albury & DFL Runners Up: Culcairn FC team photo
- 1952 – Albury & DFL Premiers: Culcairn FC team photo
- 1953 – Albury & DFL Premiers: Culcairn FC team photo
- The Farrer Football Netball League
- Riverina Football Association
- South West Football League (New South Wales)
- Australian rules football in New South Wales
