= Westby, New South Wales =

Westby
- Town
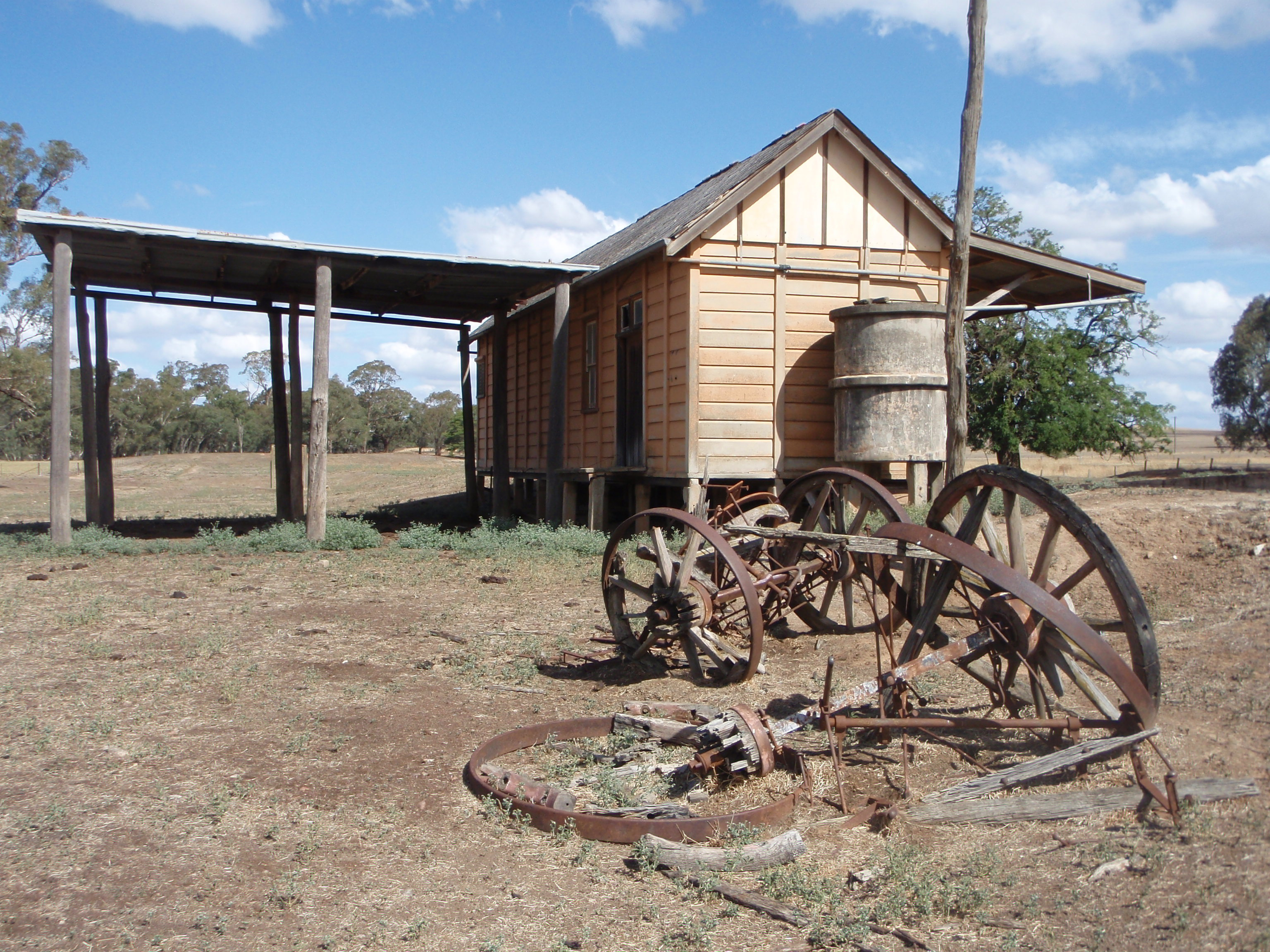
- The disused Westby railway station in March 2009

- Coordinates: 35°29′21″S 147°25′02″E
- Country: Australia
- State: New South Wales
- LGA: City of Wagga Wagga
- Location: 9 km (5.6 mi) from Pulletop; 18 km (11 mi) from Little Billabong

Government
  - State electorate: Wagga Wagga
- Postcode: 2650
- County: Mitchell

Westby is a rural community in the central east part of the Riverina. It is situated by Westby road, about 9 kilometres south east of Pulletop and 18 kilometres north of Little Billabong.

Westby was once the site of a railway station and terminus of the Westby railway line. Due to damage from a bushfire the last train to Westby was in January 1952. Services to Mangoplah, 20 kilometres to the north east, continued until the line was formally closed in July 1956.

== See also ==
- Westby railway line
