= Mangoplah Football Club =

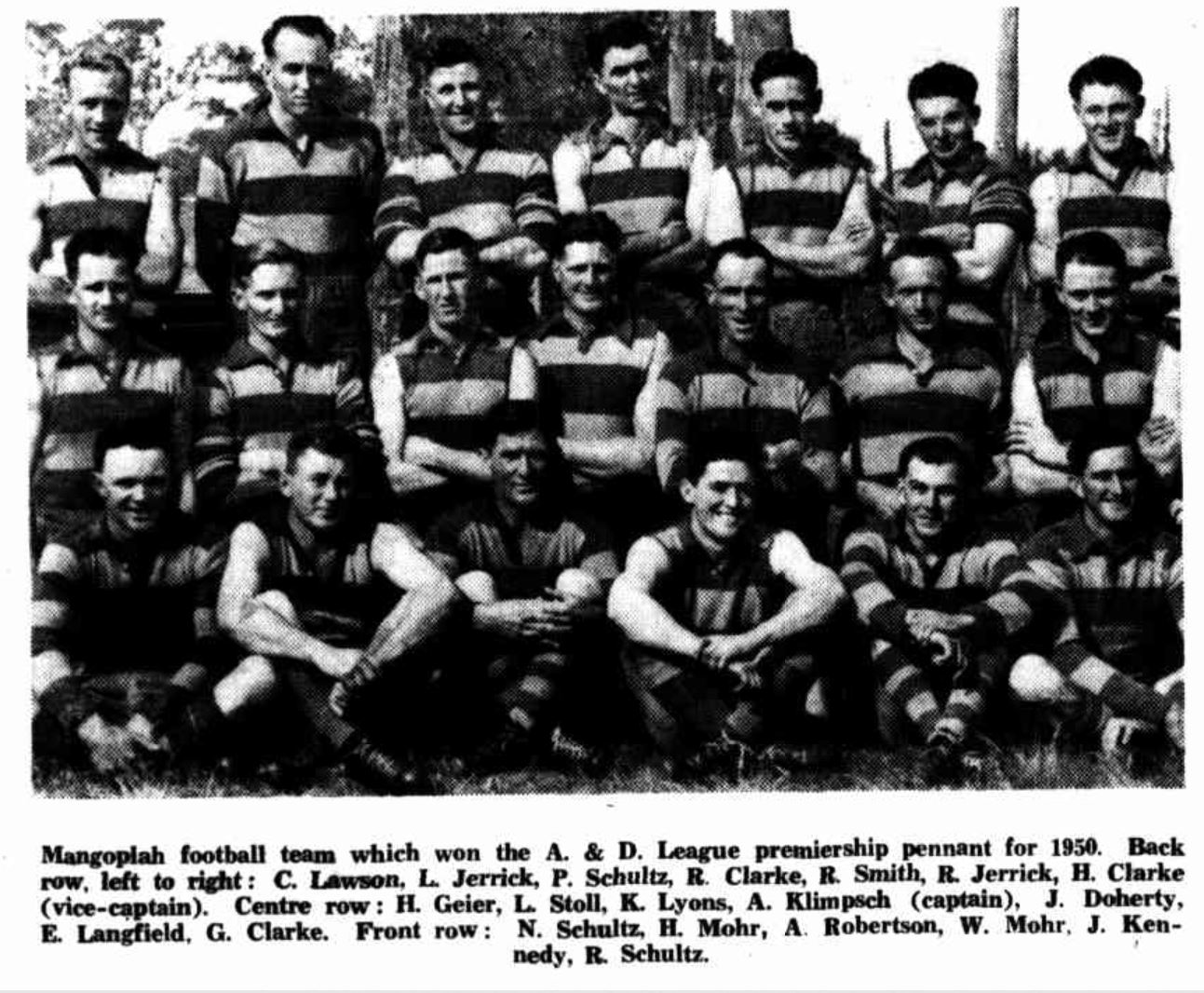
Mangoplah football team which won the A&DFL premiership pennant for 1950

The Mangoplah Cookardinia United Eastlakes Football Netball Club (MCUE) is an Australian Rules Football and netball club based at the Mangoplah Sports Ground in Mangoplah, New South Wales. Nicknamed the Goannas, the club fields teams in three football grades withe the senior men's football and netball teams competing in the Riverina Football League since 1995.

Founded as the Mangoplah Football Club in 1913 by D J Lloyd, who became the club's first captain, it has gone through a series of mergers including with 1955 the club merged with Cookardinia United FC in 1955 and Eastlakes in 1998.

== History ==
=== Early years ===
- 1913 - first documented game in August against Cookardinia
- 1914 - first official competitive match in the Yerong Creek & District Football Association for the Webster Cup against Cookardinia, Henty, The Rock and Yerong Creek. Mangoplah lost to Cookardinia. Henty won.
- 1915 - played for the Webster Cup, where they won the Grand Final Cup by defeating Yerong Creek.
- 1916 - play suspended due to World War I.
- 1917- Culcairn Patriotic Football Association competition formed, including Mangoplah, Cookardinia, Culcairn, Henty and The Rock. Mongoplah lost to Culcairn.
- 1918 - Mangoplah played in the Yerong Creek & District Football Association (YC&DFA) against The Rock and Yerong Creek.
- 1919 - Mangoplah won the grand final of the Wagga United Football Association (WUFA) by defeating Royal Stars. Alby Anderson played there from 1919 to 1922.
- 1920 - Mangoplah lost the WUFA Semi Final to the Wagga Federals. Royal Stars defeated the Federals in the Grand Final.
- 1921 - Mangoplah lost the WUFA semifinal to the Royal Stars. Royal Stars once again defeated the Federals in the 1921 Grand Final.
- 1922 - Mangoplah competed in the Riverina Main Line Football Association (RMLFA) against Culcairn, Henty, Newtown, The Rock, Wagga Federals, Wagga Stars and Yerong Creek, with the Stars defeating Yerong Creek in the Grand Final. On the eve of the final series Culcairn, Henty, and Mangoplah withdrew from the competition, because the association refused to provide a VFL umpire for the final series.
- 1923 - Mangoplah applied to re-enter the WUFA, but the other clubs voted against them. Mangoplah then joined YC&DFA and won the minor premiership but lost their semifinal match to Culcairn. Mangoplah, as the minor premiers, exercised their right to challenge the "final" winners. Mangoplah played Culcairn in the Grand Final at Yerong Creek and won the YC&DFA premiership.
- 1924 - Mangoplah re-joined WUFA, finishing 5th on the final ladder, with the Wagga Federals winning the premiership.
- 1925 - Mangoplah lost the WUFA Grand Final to The Rock, but as the minor premiers, Mangoplah challenged The Rock to another game, which Mangoplah won.
- 1926 - Mangoplah won WUFA premiership when they defeated Tootool in the Grand Final.
- 1927 - Mangoplah defeated The Rock in WUFA Grand Final.
- 1928 - Mangoplah lost the WUFA Grand Final to The Rock. As the minor premiers, Mangoplah were entitled to challenge The Rock to another game and won.
- 1929 - Mangoplah joined The Rock & District Football League (R&DFL) and competed against Cookardinia, Pleasant Hills, The Rock, Uranquinty, and Yerong Creek. Mangoplah defeated Uranquinty to win the premiership.
- 1930 - Mangoplah finished second, defeated by Uranquinty in R&DFL semifinal. Tootool defeated Osborne in the Grand Final.
- 1931 - Mangoplah won the R&DFL premiership, defeating Cookardinia in the Grand Final.
- 1932 - Mangoplah lost the R&DFL Grand Final to the Rock.
- 1933 - The R&DFL Grand Final was abandoned at half time, when police intervene late in the second quarter after a series of fights. The umpires declined to continue after half time, with the scores level at 42 – 26. Mangoplah then won The R&DFL Grand Final replay, defeating Lockhart.
- 1934 - Mangoplah joined the Wagga Australian Rules Football League (WARFL) and won the premiership, defeating Newtown in the Grand Final. Mangoplah played a match in late September against a combined WARFL side and won 70 to 68. Mangoplah's Billy Lloyd won the WARFL Best and Fairest award - the J C Blamey Blazer. After 12 years as club secretary, C. Caldwell left Mangoplah, in January.
- 1935 - former The Rock and Collingullie player, Mel Rudd, made his debut for Fitzroy. Mangoplah's Merv Cooper and W. "Billy" Lloyd both made Fitzroy's final list, but never played senior VFL football. Mangoplah went down to North Wagga in the WARFL Grand Final.
- 1936 - Mangoplah went undefeated, beating Wagga in the WARFL Grand Final that was played at Bolton Park, Wagga. Mangoplah's full forward, Eddie Smeaton, kicked 39 goals against Currawarna in the second last match. Smeaton ended up kicking 164 goals for the season, including 10 in two finals matches. Mangoplah won the Ganmain Football Carnival premiership. Mangoplah also won the Ariah Park Knockout competition, defeating Barellan 40 to 19 points in the Grand Final.
- 1937 - Mangoplah joined the Albury & District Football League (A&DFL) and lost the Grand Final to Henty. Mangoplah's Mervyn Cooper won the A&DFL best and fairest award with 31 votes.
- 1938 - Mangoplah appointed former Essendon and Sandringham player, Russell Madden as coach, and he led them to a premiership in the A&DFL, winning the Mackie Pennant. Mangoplah also won the Ariah Park football knockout competition. Mangoplah's Merv Cooper finished third in the A&DFL Best and Fairest award
- 1939 - Mangoplah lost their A&DFL semifinal match to Culcairn. Brocklesby defeated Henty in the A&DFL Grand Final.
- 1940 - Mangoplah won the A&BFL premiership, defeating Culcairn in the Grand Final. Mangoplah's captain, Ray Roberson received the A&DFL best and fairest award. Mangoplah also won the Wagga Patriotic Football Knockout competition, defeating Wagga.
- 1941 - Mangoplah returned to WARFA and won the premiership, defeating Junee. They celebrated with a Victory Ball at the Mangoplah Hall. Mangoplah's Ray Roberson was runner up in the WARFA Best and Fairest Award.
- 1942-1944 - It appears that Mangoplah was in recess due to World War II.

=== The Post War Years ===
- 1945 - After three years in recess, Mangoplah joined the Culcairn & District Football Association and won the first of six consecutive premierships defeating Henty. Mangoplah also won the Yerong Creek Football Knockout competition.
- 1946 - Mangoplah won the Yerong Creek Football Knockout competition. Mangoplah re-joined the A&DFL and won the premiership. Club Best and Fairest winner was Ray Roberson.
- 1947 - L. Anderson won the club Best and Fairest award, with Horace Clarke runner Up. Mangoplah won the A&DFL premiership.
- 1948 - Horace Clarke and Alan Klimpsch tied for the club Best and Fairest award. Mangoplah won the A&DFL premiership.
- 1949 - the club Best and Fairest winner was Bert Kelly. Mangoplah were runners-up in the Yerong Creek Knockout Carnival. Mangoplah won the A&DFL premiership.
- 1950 - the A&DFLLeague introduced a Reserve Grade Competition, and Horace Clark won the club Best and Fairest award. Horace Clark was runner up in the A&DFL Best and Fairest award. Mangoplah won the A&DFL premiership.
- 1951 - Mangoplah lost the A&DFL first semifinal to Wagga. Mangoplah hosted the A&DFL Grand Final where Holbrook defeated Culcairn.
- 1952 - the A&DFL Reserves competition was divided into two divisions – North (Wagga) and South (Albury). Mangoplah lost their A&DFL first semifinal to Holbrook. Mangoplah hosted the A&DFL Grand Final in which Culcairn defeated Wagga, which ended sensationally. Mangoplah were runners-up in the Yerong Creek Knockout Carnival.
- 1953 - Mangoplah finished 7th on the ladder, with three wins and eleven losses for the season, while their second eighteen finished 3rd.
- 1954 - Mangoplah appointed former Richmond player, Bernie Waldron as coach, and finished the season in 5th place with five wins, eight losses and one draw, while Cookardinia finished last, with one win and 13 losses. Mangoplah and Cookardinia football clubs merged.. In March, Watty Lloyd retired after completing 21 consecutive years as club secretary. Bill McRae took over as secretary, and Bill Parker replaced Ray Roberson as president.
- 1955 - Mangoplah Cookardinia FC entered the A&DFL
- 1985 - Steve Cole and Mark Fraser represented NSW against the ACT.
- 1998 - Mangoplah Cookardinia United-Eastlakes Football Club was formed in 1998 via the merger of the Mangoplah Cookadinia United Football Club and Eastlakes Football Club.

== Mangoplah FC Senior Football Timeline & Premierships (1913 to 1954) ==
- 1913 - No competition matches, just a few friendly matches against other local teams.
- 1914 - Yerong Creek & District Football Association.
- 1915 - Yerong Creek & District Football Association. Webster Cup (Premiers)
- 1916 - Mangoplah FC in recess due to World War I
- 1917 - Culcairn & District Patriotic Football Association
- 1918 - Yerong Creek & District Football Association
- 1919 to 1921 - WUFA: 1919
- 1922 - Riverina Main Line Football Association
- 1923 - Yerong Creek & District Football Association: 1923
- 1924 to 1928 - WUFA: 1925, 1926, 1927, 1928
- 1929 to 1933 -The Rock & District Football League: 1929, 1931,1933
- 1934 to 1936 - Wagga Australian Rules Football League: 1934, 1936
- 1936 to 1938 - Ariah Park Knock Out Competition, Ganmain Football Carnival
- 1937 to 1940 - A&DFL: 1938, 1940
- 1940 - Wagga Patriotic Football Knockout Competition
- 1941 - Wagga Australian Rules Football League
- 1942 to 1944 - Mangoplah FC in recess due to World War II
- 1945 - Culcairn & District Football Association
- 1945 to 1946 - Yerong Creek Knockout Football Carnival
- 1946 to 1954 - A&DFL
- 1953 - Yerong Creek Knockout Football Carnival

Runners up

- 1917 - Culcairn & District Patriotic Football Association
- 1930 - The Rock & District Football League
- 1932 - The Rock & District Football League
- 1935 - Wagga Australian Rules Football League
- 1937 - A&DFL
- 1947 - Yerong Creek Football Carnival
- 1952 - Yerong Creek Football Carvival

Senior Football Captain / Coaches

- 1920 - J Pigdon (captain)
- 1924 - J Lloyd (captain)
- 1927–30: Perry Armstrong
- 1931–34: Paddy Lloyd
- 1935 - J Lloyd (captain)
- 1936–37: No information
- 1938 - Russell Madden
- 1939 - Ray Roberson (captain)
- 1940 - Ray Roberson (captain)
- 1941 - Ray Roberson
- 1945 - No information
- 1946–48: Ray Roberson
- 1949–51: Allan Klimpsch
- 1952 - Harry Kline
- 1953 - Allan Klimpsch
- 1954 - Bernie Waldron

VFL Players

The following footballers played with Mangoplah prior to senior VFL football.

- 1923 – Tim Archer – St. Kilda
- 1924 – Alby Anderson – St. Kilda & Richmond
- 1935 – Mel Rudd – Fitzroy

== Mangoplah / Cookardinia United FC Senior Football Premierships & Timeline (1955-1997) ==
- 1955-1956 - A&DFL
- 1957-1981 - Farrer Football League
- 1982-1984 - Riverina District Football League
- 1985-1994 - Farrer Football League – Division One: 1985, 1988, 1989, 1990 & 1993
- 1995-1997 - Riverina Football League

Senior Football – Runners Up

- Farrer Football League -1958, 1969, 1974, 1978
- 1982- 1984 - Riverina District Football League: 1982, 1983, 1984
- 1985 - 1994 - Farrer Football League – Division One: 1986, 1987, 1992, 1993

Senior Football Coaches

- 1953–55: Allan Klimpsch
- 1956–59: Bill Byrne
- 1960: Allan Klimpsch
- 1961–62: Bill Barton
- 1963–65: Frank Slater
- 1966–70: Arthur Cole
- 1970–72: No information
- 1973–75: Graham Ion
- 1976: Arch Wilkey
- 1978: No information
- 1979: Greg Carroll
- 1980–81: Mick Daniher
- 1982: Phil Cohalan
- 1983–85: Greg Leech
- 1986–87: Zane Separovich
- 1988–89: Steven Hedley
- 1990: Tony Turner
- 1991: Scott Barber
- 1992–94: Phil Cohalan
- 1995: Shane Gorman
- 1996: Danny Galvin
- 1997–98: Merv Neagle

VFL / AFL Players

The following players played with Mangoplah / Cookardinia prior to playing VFL football, with the year indicating their VFL / AFL debut.

- 1957 – Bill Byrne – Melbourne
- 1979 – Wayne Carroll – Sydney Swans
- 1987 – Matthew Lloyd – Sydney Swans
- 1987 – Michael Phyland – Sydney Swans
- 1993 – Nathon Irvin – Sydney Swans
- 1997 – Mark Conway – Port Adelaide

== Mangoplah Cookardinia United Eastlakes FNC Senior Premierships & Timeline (1998-2020) ==
- 1998- Present Riverina Football League

Senior – Runners Up

- Riverina Football League: 2015, 2015

Senior Football Coaches

- 1997–98: Merv Neagle
- 1999: No information
- 2000: Bevan Rowe
- 2001: Owen Geddes
- 2002–03: Scott Allen
- 2004–05: Rodney Simms
- 2006: Barry O'Brien
- 2007: Tony Balding (npc)
- 2008: Nick Smith
- 2009: Wayne de Britt (npc)
- 2010–11: Chris Willis
- 2012–14: Nathon Irvin
- 2015: Chris Daniher / Trevor Ion (npc)
- 2016: Nathon Irvin / Travis Cohalan
- 2017–18: Travis Cohalan (npc)
- 2019–20: Jeremy Rowe (npc)
- (npc): non-playing coach)

AFL Players

The following footballers played with MCUEFC prior to being drafted by an AFL club

- 2012 – Orren Stephenson – Geelong
- 2000 – Jock Cornell – Geelong. (2016 AFL Rookie Draft No.9)
- 2015 – Harrison Himmelberg – Greater Western Sydney
