= Brocklesby, New South Wales =

Brocklesby
- Town
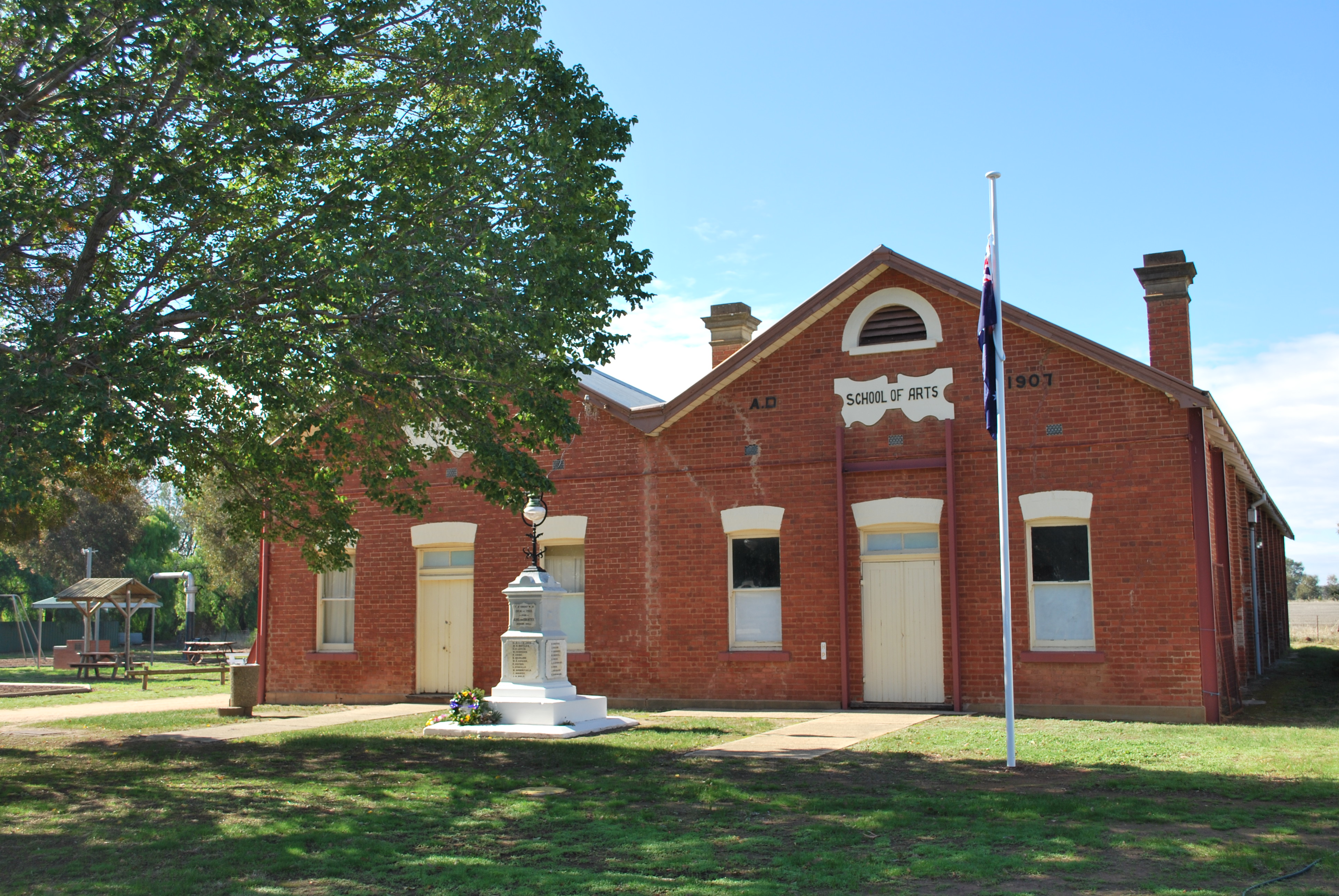
- Brocklesby School of Arts, 1907

- Coordinates: 35°49′24″S 146°40′47″E
- Country: Australia
- State: New South Wales
- LGA: Greater Hume Shire
- Location: 567 km (352 mi) from Sydney; 45 km (28 mi) from Albury; 22 km (14 mi) from Howlong; 16 km (9.9 mi) from Walbundrie

Government
  - State electorate: Albury
  - Federal division: Farrer
- Elevation: 250 m (820 ft)

Population
  - Total: 218 (2021 census)
- Postcode: 2642
- County: Hume

Brocklesby /ˈbrɒkəlzbi/ is a town in the Riverina region of south west New South Wales, Australia. The town is in the Greater Hume Shire Council local government area, 45 kilometres (28 mi) north-west of the regional centre of Albury. In the 2021 census Brocklesby had a population of 218.

Brocklesby, although having only a very small population prides itself on having an active community, including a long-standing pigeon club. (The pigeon shed was taken down in 2011.) Town buildings include the public hall, a recreation reserve, local primary school and pre-school, and since 2000, a public hotel which is owned by the Greater Hume Shire Council and operating under a community licence.

== Historical significance ==
Brocklesby village was once a main railway centre used for the transportation of grain. Nowadays the grain silos and railway tracks are all that remain and grain is transported by road truck. The area is now characterised by sheep, cattle and grain farmland.

Tom Roberts painted his celebrated masterpiece Shearing the Rams at "Brocklesby" Station at nearby Corowa.

Brocklesby Post Office opened on 29 April 1893. The new Brocklesby Shop replaced the first shop and opened in mid-2010 and is now closed.

== Avro Anson plane crash ==
The area is also known for a historical emergency landing of two twin-engine Avro Anson training planes that collided overhead and became entangled with one plane sitting on top of the other. The three crew members of the lower plane parachuted to safety whilst Leading Aircraftsman Leonard Fuller, the pilot of the top plane undertook a daring and heroic flight of 8 kilometres (5.0 mi) before belly landing the two planes single-handed in a paddock approximately 4 kilometres (2 mi) from the town.

== Sports and Recreation ==
Brocklesby Football Netball Club

The Brocklesby Football Club appears to have had their preliminary meeting in May 1907 and from there, played a number of friendly games against other local towns up until they played in the Western Division of the Culcairn & District Football Association in 1910 and 1911 against Balldale, Walbundrie and Walla.

Brocklesby's golden era was certainly in the 1920s, when the club played in nine consecutive grand finals between 1923 and 1931, but only won two premierships during this successful period in 1924 and 1928.

In 1939, Brocklesby kicked 34.24 – 228 against Cookardinia, with "Shady" James kicking 19 goals to eclipse the previous best of 14 goals by Vin Smith.

Brocklesby had a famous grand final victory over Henty to win the 1939 Albury & District Football League premiership after Wally Crooks kicked a goal after the siren, from a free kick to win by two points, under captain / coach, Jim Steigenberger. Henty then lodged an appeal to the Albury & DFL, which was defeated then appealed to the Murray District Football Council, which was then upheld, awarding the premiership to Henty. Brocklesby then appealed that decision to the Victorian Country Football League, which was up held, allowing Brocklesby to finally be declared the 1939 premiers.

Brocklesby FNC have played in the following football competitions:

- 1910–1914 – Culcairn & District Football Association (Western District)
- 1915–1919 – Club in recess due to World War One
- 1920–1921 – Walla Football Association
- 1922–1923 – Hume Football Association. Runners Up: 1923
- 1924–1929 – Riverina Football Association. Premiers: 1924, 1928. Runners Up: 1925, 1926, 1927, 1929
- 1930 – Corowa & District Football Association. Runners Up: 1930
- 1931–1932 – Albury & District Football League. Runners Up: 1931
- 1933–1934 – Central Hume Football League
- 1935–1940 – Albury & District Football League. Premiers: 1939
- 1941–1944 – Club in recess due to World War Two
- 1945–2005 – Hume Football League. Premiers: 1950 & 1958. Runners Up: 1949, 1976, 1980, 1983, 1984.
- 2006–2021 – Hume Football League. Merged with Burrumbuttock in 2006. Premiers: 2013, 2015, 2016, 2018. Runners Up: 2019.

VFL / AFL Players

The following VFL / AFL footballers played with Brocklesby FC.

- Vin Smith
- Jim Steigenberger
- Shadrach James
- Dudley Probyn
- George McInnes
- Justin Koschitzke
- Tony Armstrong

Brocklesby Cricket Club went through the 1913/14 season undefeated and won the premiership.

Brocklesby CC currently play in the Cricket Albury Wodonga Hume Under 13's competition.

== Gallery ==
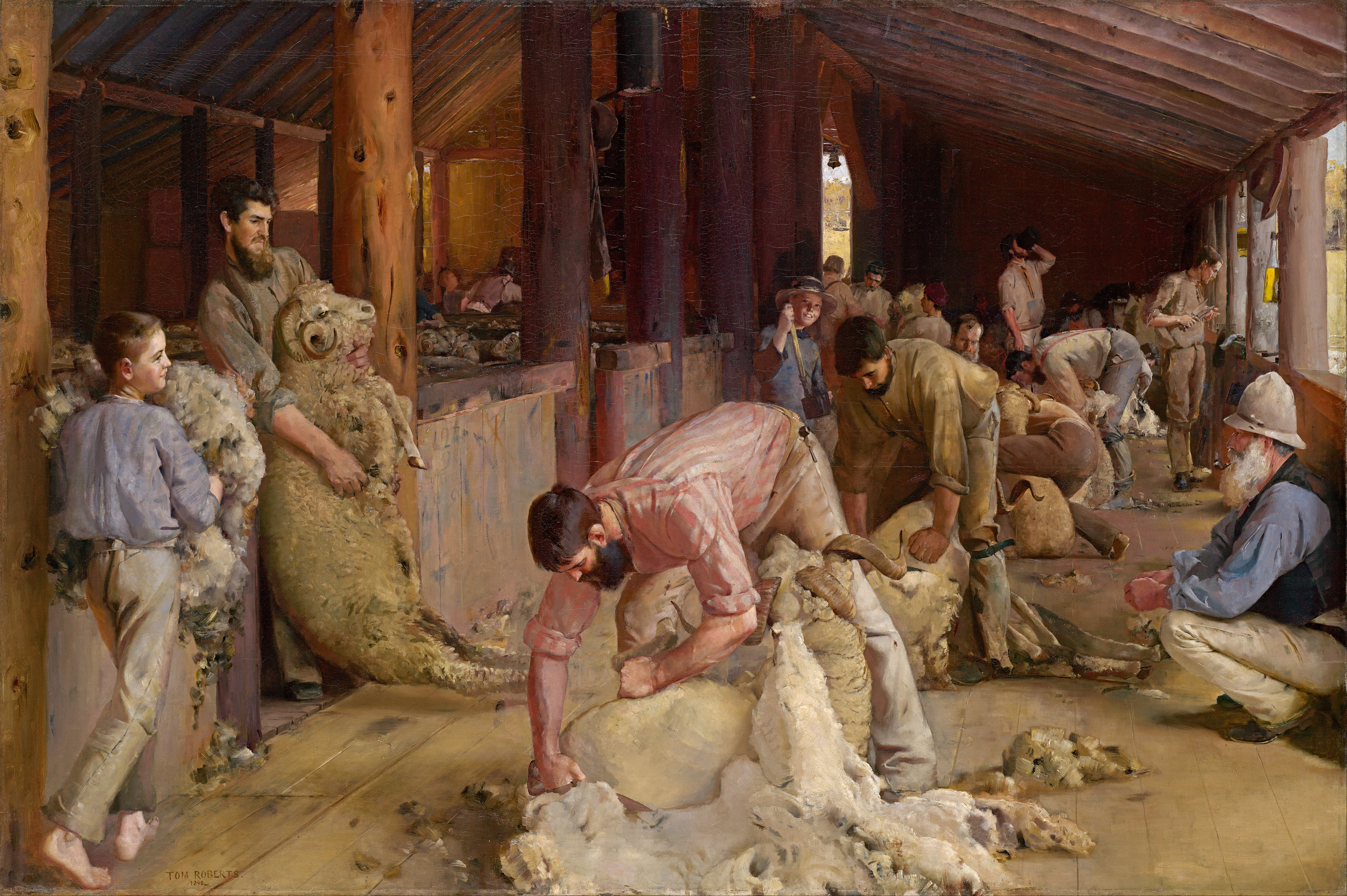
Shearing the Rams (1890) by Tom Roberts

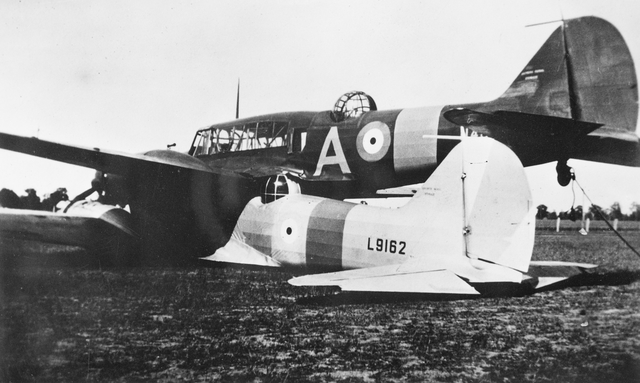
Two Avro Ansons (L9162 and N4876) "piggyback"

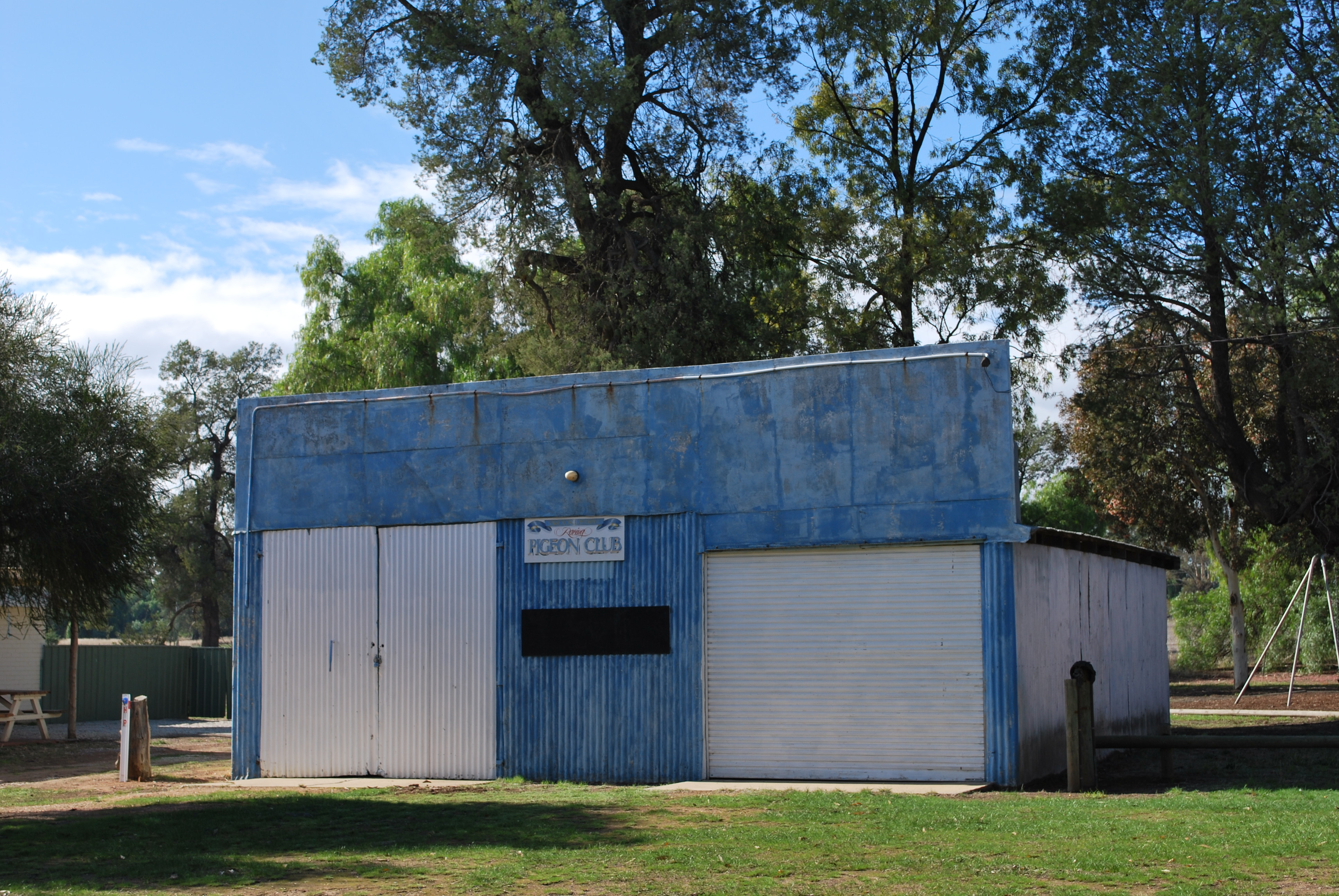
Brocklesby pigeon club
