= Shadrach James =

Australian rules footballer, born 1917

Personal information
- Nickname: Shady
- Born: 30 November 1917; Echuca, Victoria
- Died: 20 November 1973 (aged 55); Mooroopna, Victoria
- Original teams: Mooroopna, Brocklesby
- Height: 173 cm (5 ft 8 in)
- Weight: 68 kg (150 lb)

Playing career
Years	Club	Games (Goals)
1940–1941	Fitzroy	18 (20)

Shadrach Garfield James (30 November 1917 – 20 November 1973) was an Indigenous Australian Australian rules footballer.

== Family ==
Shadrach Garfield James was born in Echuca on 30 November 1917 as the son of Indigenous Australian activist Shadrach Livingstone James and Maggie James, née Campbell. James was a cousin of Sir Doug Nicholls and this reference states he was born in Wahgunyah, Victoria.

== Playing career ==
In 1938, James kicked 115 goals for the Mooroopna in the Goulburn Valley Football Association, including another 13 during the finals for a total of 128, in which he played Mooroopna's 1940 losing grand final side.

In 1939, Brocklesby kicked 34.24 - 228 against Cookardinia, with "Shady" James kicking 19 goals to eclipse Brocklesby's previous best of 14 goals by Vin Smith. James kicked five goals for Brocklesby in the 1939 Albury & District Football League premiership. All up, James kicked 82 goals in the home and away series plus 16 goals in the finals, for a total of 98 goals in 17 games in 1939.

James commenced training with Fitzroy in 1940 with a number of other players from the Albury & District Football League and played 18 matches for Fitzroy in the Victorian Football League between 1940 and 1941. James, a left footer, was the fourth Indigenous Australian to play for Fitzroy.

In 1943, James' brother, Rupert was signed up to Fitzroy.

In 1946, James was club secretary and coach of the All Blacks Football Club in the Central Goulburn Valley Football League and kicked nine goals in their grand final win against Toolamba.

James went onto play with various club's throughout the Goulburn Valley and North East Victoria and played football well into the late 1940's, as he played in Wangaratta's 1948 losing Ovens & Murray Football League preliminary final side.
