= Central Riverina Football League =

Minor Australian rules football competition

The Central Riverina Football League was a minor Australian rules football competition which ran from 1949 until 1981 in the Riverina region of New South Wales. The league contained a number of historic clubs, many of which no longer exist.

== History ==
There was a Central Riverina Football League that was formed in 1907 in Narrandra, that was made up from the Coolamon, Hay and Narrandra football clubs.

The Central Riverina Football League (CRFL) was formed in 1949 at the annual general meeting of the Milbrulong & District Football League, when it was decided to change its name to the Central Riverina Football League.

The Milbrulong Football Association was reformed in 1945, after a five-year break due to World War II and was active up until 1948, when the name change took place in early 1949.

In 1946, Boree Creek and Collingullie joined the Milbrulong & DFL from the Lockhart & District Football League.

In 1947 and 1948, some clubs arranged reserve grade matches against other teams, but there was no official competition.

At the 1948 AGM, Mr. Albert Ziebell (Railway Hotel, Lockhart) promised £3/3/ towards the trophy for the best and fairest player in the CRFL.

At the 1949 AGM, Mr. T Brennan of Milbrulong donated £10/10/ towards a cup for the best and fairest player in the CRFL, to be known as the Brennan Cup.

On Wednesday, 12 September 1951, Hawthorn: 20.15 – 135 defeated the Central Riverina Football League: 6.6 – 42, which was played at Lockhart.

The CRFL Reserves / Second eighteen competition was introduced into the CRFL in the late 1950s.

Osborne played in ten grand finals between 1945 and 1961, winning four premierships, while East Wagga played in eight grand final between 1967 and 1976, for four premierships.

In 1982 the CRFL merged with the South West Football League (New South Wales) and the old Farrer Football League to form the Riverina Football Netball League and the Riverina District Football League.

It was between 1983 and 1994 that the Riverina District Football League / Farrer Football League maintained a two division system.

The Riverina District Football League changed its name to the Farrer Football League in 1985.

== Clubs ==
=== Final ===
| Club | Jumper | Nickname | Home Ground | Former League | Est. | Years in CRFL | CRFL Senior Premierships | | Fate |
| Club | Jumper | Nickname | Home Ground | Former League | Est. | Years in CRFL | Total | Most recent | Fate |
|---|---|---|---|---|---|---|---|---|---|
| Army | | Cats | Kapooka Army Base Oval, Kapooka | WSFL | 1946 | 1957-1972, 1975-1981 | 4 | 1967, 1969, 1970, 1971 | Merged with Junee to form Junee-Kapooka in Riverina & District FL following 1981 season |
| Barellan United | | Kangaroos | Barellan Sportsground, Barellan | B&DFL | 1970 | 1973-1981 | 2 | 1975, 1981 | Moved to Riverina FL following 1981 season |
| Boree Creek | | Creekers, Magpies | Boree Creak Recreation Reserve, Boree Creek | F&DFA, C&DFL | 1886 | 1946-1947, 1949-1969, 1980-1981 | 1 | 1953 | Played in Coreen & District FL in 1948. Moved to Hume FL in 1970. Moved to Riverina & District FL following 1981 season |
| Junee | | Bulldogs | Laurie Daley Oval, Junee | FFL | 1919 | 1960-1981 | 1 | 1962 | Merged with Army to form Junee-Kapooka in Riverina & District FL following 1981 season |
| Marrar | | Bombers | Langtry Oval, Marrar | WSFL | 1918 | 1957-1981 | 3 | 1965, 1966, 1979 | Moved to Riverina & District FL following 1981 season |
| RAAF | | Hornets | RAAF Base Oval, Forest Hill | WSFL | 1948 | 1957-1966, 1968-1969, 1972-1981 | 0 | - | In recess in 1967 and 1970-71. Moved to Riverina & District FL following 1981 season |
| RCAE | | Bushpigs | Peter Hastie Oval, Charles Sturt University | – | 1972 | 1972-1981 | 1 | 1978 | Moved to Riverina & District FL following 1981 season |
| South Wagga-Tolland Dons (Marian Dons 1971-77) | | Dons | Maher Oval, Glenfield Park | – | 1971 | 1971-1981 | 0 | - | Moved to Riverina & District FL following 1981 season |
| Whitton | | Tigers | Whitton Recreation Ground, Whitton | SWDFL | 1890s | 1979-1981 | 0 | - | Moved to Riverina & District FL following 1981 season |

=== Former ===
| Club | Jumper | Nickname | Home Ground | Former League | Est. | Years in CRFL | CRFL Senior Premierships | | Fate |
| Club | Jumper | Nickname | Home Ground | Former League | Est. | Years in CRFL | Total | Most recent | Fate |
|---|---|---|---|---|---|---|---|---|---|
| Collingullie | | Demons | Crossroads Oval, Collingullie | WFA | 1906 | 1946-1964 | 4 | 1951, 1952, 1963, 1964 | Moved to Farrer FL following 1964 season |
| Cootamundra | | Blues | Clarke Oval, Cootamundra | – | 1960 | 1960-1980 | 4 | 1973, 1974, 1977, 1980 | Moved to South West District FL following 1980 season |
| East Wagga | | Saints | Gumly Oval, Gumly Gumly | WSFL | 1946 | 1959-1976 | 3 | 1968, 1972, 1976 | Moved to Farrer FL following 1976 season |
| Lockhart | (1947-52)(1953-56) | Bulldogs | Lockhart Recreation Ground, Lockhart | TR&DFL | 1898 | 1945-1956 | 3 | 1948, 1949, 1956 | Moved to Albury & District FL following 1956 season |
| Milbrulong | | Maroons | Milbrulong Recreation Ground, Milbrulong | TR&DFL | | 1945-1958 | 1 | 1949 | Folded after 1958 season |
| Mittagong | | Greens | Mittagong Recreation Ground, Yerong Creek | TR&DFL | 1932 | 1945-1949 | 0 | – | Folded after 1949 season |
| Osborne | | Tigers | Osborne Recreation Reserve, Osborne | TR&DFL | 1901 | 1945-1969 | 4 | 1950, 1957, 1958, 1961 | Moved to Hume FL following 1969 season |
| Pleasant Hills | | | Pleasant Hills Recreation Reserve, Pleasant Hills | TR&DFL | | 1948-1953 | 0 | – | Folded due to insufficient playing numbers at 1954 AGM |
| Rannock | | Federals | Rannock Recreation Reserve, Rannock | SWDFL | 1923 | 1962-1964 | 0 | – | Folded due to insufficient playing numbers prior to 1965 season |
| Temora | | Kangaroos | Nixon Park, Temora | WSFL | 1949 | 1957-1960 | 2 | 1959, 1960 | Moved to Farrer FL following 1961 season |
| The Rock | | Magpies | Victoria Park, The Rock | TR&DFL | c.1920s | 1945-1947 | 2 | 1945, 1947 | Moved to Albury & District FL following 1947 season |
| Tumut | | Hawks | Tumut Recreation Reserve, Tumut | – | 1970 | 1970-1977 | 0 | – | Moved to Upper Murray FL following 1977 season |
| Turvey Park | | Bulldogs | Maher Oval, Wagga Wagga | A&DFL reserve grade | 1954 | 1955 | 1 | 1955 | Moved to South West District FL following 1955 season |
| Uranquinty | | Rosellas | Uranquinty Oval, Uranquinty | WFL | 1921 | 1950-1951, 1964-1967 | 0 | – | In recess between 1952-63 and 1968-84. Re-formed in Farrer FL in 1985 |
| Yerong Creek | | Blue & Whites | Yerong Creek Sports Ground, Yerong Creek | TR&DFL | 1910 | 1945-1955 | 1 | 1954 | Moved to Albury & District FL following 1955 season |
| Young | | Saints | Miller-Henry Oval, Burrangong | – | 1976 | 1976-1977 | 0 | – | Moved to Northern Riverina FL following 1977 season |

== Football Grand Finals ==
Seniors

| Year | Premiers | Score | Runners up | Score | Captain | Coach | Venue | Gate | Premiership Cup |
1945-1948: Milbrulong & DFL
| 1945 | The Rock | 13.10 – 82 | Osborne | 8.16 – 64 | | | | | |
| 1946 | Milbrulong | 11.12 – 78 | Osborne | 7.12 – 54 | Bryan Brennan | | The Rock | | Donald Ross Cup Umpire: McIntyre (VFL) |
| 1947 | The Rock | 15.17 – 107 | Osborne | 14.4 – 89 | | | Milbrulong | £104 | Donald Ross Cup Umpire: Wollesley (VFL) |
| 1948 | Lockhart | 9.14 – 68 | Yerong Creek | 9.13 – 67 | B Dowdle | Vince Sullivan | Milbrulong | | Donald Ross Cup Umpire: Male (VFL) |
1949-1981: Central Riverina FL
| 1949 | Lockhart | 15.12 – 102 | Yerong Creek | 7.7 – 49 | | Vince O'Sullivan | Milbrulong | | Donald Ross Cup Umpire: Haywood (VFL) |
| 1950 | Osborne | 10.8 – 68 | Yerong Creek | 6.11 – 47 | | | Collingullie | £110 | Donald Ross Cup Umpire: Clayton (VFL) |
| 1951 | Collingullie | 12.16 – 88 | Osborne | 3.7 – 25 | | | Milbrulong | | Umpire: Hopkins (VFL) |
| 1952 | Collingullie | 12.9 – 81 | Yerong Creek | 6.10 – 46 | | | Milbrulong | £135 | Umpire: Hopkins (VFL) |
| 1953 | Boree Creek | 14.11 – 95 | Collingullie | 9.9 – 63 | Ivan Argus | Ivan Argus | Milbrulong | | Umpire: (VFL) |
| 1954 | Yerong Creek | 10.11 – 71 | Milbrulong | 7.6 – 48 | | | | | |
| 1955 | Turvey Park | 8.12 – 60 | Osborne | 8.12 – 60 | | | | | (drawn grand final) |
| | Turvey Park | 9.7 – 61 | Osborne | 4.10 – 34 | | | | | (grand final reply) |
| 1956 | Lockhart | 12.11 – 83 | Milbrulong | 19.9 – 69 | | | | | |
| 1957 | Osborne | 9.13 – 67 | Milbrulong | 7.12 – 54 | | | | | |
| 1958 | Osborne | 16.16 – 122 | Marrar | 8.3 – 51 | | | | | |
| 1959 | Temora | 16.12 – 108 | Marrar | 12.9 – 81 | | | | | |
| 1960 | Temora | 9.7 – 60 | Marrar | 4.4 – 28 | | | Bolton Park, Wagga | | |
| 1961 | Osborne | 12.11 – 83 | Boree Creek | 7.15 – 57 | | | | £ | |
| 1962 | Junee | 16.9 – 105 | Boree Creek | 16.6 – 102 | | | | £ | |
| 1963 | Collingullie | 14.16 – 100 | Boree Creek | 4.8 – 32 | | | | £ | |
| 1964 | Collingullie | 11.11 – 77 | Junee | 8.8 – 56 | | | | £ | |
| 1965 | Marrar | 12.20 – 92 | Cootamundra | 11.11 – 77 | | | | £ | |
| 1966 | Marrar | 9.12 – 66 | Cootamundra | 3.5 – 23 | | | | | |
| 1967 | Army | 16.18 – 114 | East Wagga | 4.5 – 29 | | | | | |
| 1968 | East Wagga | 7.16 – 58 | Junee | 6.5 – 41 | | | | | |
| 1969 | Army | 11.13 – 79 | East Wagga | 9.13.67 | | | | | |
| 1970 | Army | 19.19 – 133 | East Wagga | 15.15. – 105 | | | | | |
| 1971 | Army | 15.7 – 97 | Marrar | 14.14 – 92 | | | | | |
| 1972 | East Wagga | 16.14 – 110 | Army | 9.20 – 74 | | | | | |
| 1973 | Cootamundra | 17.22 – 124 | East Wagga | 14.7 – 91 | | | | | |
| 1974 | Cootamundra | 6.8 – 44 | Barellan United | 4.9 – 33 | | | | | |
| 1975 | Barellan United | 13.14 – 92 | East Wagga | 7.9 – 51 | | | | | |
| 1976 | East Wagga | 13.12 – 90 | Cootamundra | 9.9 – 63 | | | | | |
| 1977 | Cootamundra | 11.18 – 84 | Marrar | 8.6 – 54 | | | | | |
| 1978 | RCAE | 14.8 – 92 | Barellan United | 10.8 – 68 | | | | | |
| 1979 | Marrar | 14.19 – 103 | Barellan United | 14.8 – 92 | | | | | |
| 1980 | Cootamundra | 18.17 – 125 | Marrar | 6.5 – 41 | | | | | |
| 1981 | Barellan United | 15.16 – 106 | Marrar | 7.14 – 56 | | | | | |
| | Riverina DISTRICT FL | | | | | | | | |
| 1982 | Collingullie – Ashmont | 21.15 – 141 | Mangoplah CU | 11.10 – 76 | Ian Rainbird | Ian Rainbird | Maher Oval, Wagga | | |
| | Riverina DISTRICT FL: Division 1 | | | | | | | | |
| 1983 | North Wagga | 25.15 – 155 | Mangoplah CU | 17.15 – 117 | Martin King | Martin King | | | |
| 1984 | Collingullie – Ashmont | 16.20 – 116 | Mangoplah CU | 11.16 – 82 | Gary Colvin | Gary Colvin | | | |

Seniors

- 1985: The Riverina District Football League changed its name to the Farrer Football League in 1985 and maintained a Farrer FL Division One competition & Farrer FL Division Two competition up until 1994.

Central Riverina Football League
Reserves

- 1946: Mittagong
- 1947: Yerong Creek: 7.7 – 49 d Mittagong: 5.6 – 36
- 1948: RAAF: 8.8 – 56 drew Central Riverina FL U/21: 8.8 – 56 (curtain raiser)
- 1949: Albury & District Football League: 7.12 – 54 drew Central Riverina FL: 9.0 – 54 (curtain raiser)
- 1952: Lockhart v MIlbrulong
- 1953: Osborne v Milbrulong
- 1959: Army: 13.8 – 86 d Temora: 9.8 – 62
- 1960: East Wagga: 7.6 – 48 d Junee: 2.3 – 15
- 1961: Junee d RAAF
- 1962: Army d RAAF
- 1963: Army d RAAF
- 1964: RAAF d Cootamundra
- 1965: RAAF d Army
- 1966: Marrar d East Wagga
- 1967: Army d East Wagga
- 1968: Army d Junee
- 1969: Army d RAAF
- 1970: East Wagga d Cootamundra
- 1971: Army d East Wagga
- 1972: East Wagga d RAAF
- 1973: East Wagga d RAAF
- 1974: East Wagga: 56 d Cootamundra: 46
- 1975: East Wagga d RAAF
- 1976: East Wagga d RAAF
- 1977: Barellan United d Marain Dons
- 1978: Marrar d South Wagga Tollard
- 1979: Barellan United d Marrar
- 1980: Barellan United: 15.9 – 99 d Junee: 10.8 – 68
- 1981:

Riverina DISTRICT Football League (1982)
Reserves

- 1982: Junee: 9.18 – 72 d TRYC: 7.11 – 53

Central Riverina FL – Most Senior Premierships / Runners Up (1949–1981)

| Club | Most Premierships | Runners up | Grand Finals |
|---|---|---|---|
| Collingullie | 4 | 1 | 5 |
| Cootamundra | 4 | 3 | 7 |
| East Wagga | 3 | 5 | 8 |
| Osborne | 4 | 3 | 7 |
| Army | 4 | 1 | 5 |
| Marrar | 3 | 7 | 10 |
| Barellan United | 2 | 3 | 5 |
| Lockhart | 3 | 0 | 2 |
| Temora | 2 | 0 | 2 |
| Boree Creek | 1 | 3 | 4 |
| Junee | 1 | 1 | 2 |
| RCAE | 1 | 0 | 1 |
| Turvey Park | 1 | 0 | 1 |
| Milbrulong | 0 | 3 | 3 |
| Yerong Creek | 0 | 3 | 3 |
| TOTAL | 33 | 33 | 66 |

- 1946 – 1950: Senior Premiership Cup: Donald Ross Cup
- 1946 – 1953: Reserves Premiership Cup: Cooper Cup
- RCAE – Riverina College of Advanced Education

== Leading Goalkickers ==
- 1976 – P. Carroll – East Wagga – 113
- 1977 – Rod Milthorpe – Cootamundra – 82
- 1978 – B. Spencer – Junee – 72
- 1979 – C. Griffiths – RAAF – 62
- 1980 – C. Eaton – Cootamundra – 82
- 1981 – Neil Diggleman – Barellan United – 54

== Best & Fairest Award ==
Senior Football

- Brennan Cup (1949)
- Coghill Medal

| Year | Winner | Club | Votes | Runner up | Club | Votes |
|---|---|---|---|---|---|---|
| | Milbrilong & DFL | | | | | |
| 1945 | | | | | | no record of winner |
| 1946 | | | | | | no record of winner |
| 1947 | Charles Doig | Osborne | 38 | Ross Garrett | Lockhart | 33 |
| 1948 | Ross Garrett | Milbrulong | 34 | Kevin Terlich | Pleasant Hills | 20 |
| | Central Riverina FL | | | | | |
| 1949 | Charles Doig | Osborne | | | | Brennan Cup |
| 1950 | | | | | | |
| 1951 | | | | | | |
| 1952 | | | | | | |
| 1953 | Merv Priest | Collinguille | | Jim Stockton | Milbrulong | |
| 1954 | | | | | | |
| 1955 | | | | | | |
| 1956 | | | | | | |
| 1957 | | | | | | |
| 1958 | | | | | | |
| 1959 | | | | | | |
| 1960 | B Smith | Osborne | | | | |
| 1961 | Peter Wilson | Boree Creek | | | | |
| 1962 | Peter Wilson | Boree Creek | | | | |
| 1963 | Peter Wilson | Boree Creek | | | | |
| 1964 | B Douglas | Osborne | | | | |
| 1965 | B Douglas | Osborne | | | | |
| 1966 | G Smith | Army | | | | |
| 1967 | B McCaffery | Army | | | | |
| 1968 | G Buchanan & | Army | | | | |
| | N Rowlands | Army | | | | |
| 1969 | N Jarvis | Army | | | | |
| 1970 | N Jarvis | Army | | | | |
| 1971 | Reg Hamilton | Marrar | | | | |
| 1972 | B Murphy | RCAE | | | | |
| 1973 | B Harper | Marrar | | | | |
| 1974 | B Harper | Marrar | | | | |
| 1975 | B Harper | Marrar | | | | |
| 1976 | Ken Forbes | Cootamundra | | | | |
| 1977 | Ken Forbes | Cootamundra | | | | |
| 1978 | M Briggs | Junee | | | | |
| 1979 | Errol Boots | Whitton | | | | |
| 1980 | P Butterworth | RCAE | | | | |
| 1981 | Errol Boots | Whitton | 20 | R Reed | South West Tolland | 16 |
| | Riverina DISTRICT FL | Gerald Clear Medal | | | | |
| 1982 | Bruce Rollins | Marrar | 21 | Errol Boots | Whitton | 20 |
| | Riverina DISTRICT FL: Div 1 | Gerald Clear Medal | | | | |
| 1983 | Laurie Pendick | North Wagga | 22 | Phil Reid | Temora | 20 |
| 1984 | Danny Malone | Marrar | 21 | Ian Geddes | Barellan | 19 |
| 1985 | Farrer Football League:Div 1 | Gerald Clear Medal | | | | |

- 1985 – RDFL changed its name to the Farrer FL.

== Officer Bearers ==
| Year | President | Secretary | Treasurer |
|---|---|---|---|
| | Milbrulong & DFL | | |
| 1945 | Ernest C. Howard | | |
| 1946 | Ernest C. Howard | George Cowin | |
| 1947 | Ernest C. Howard | E. Head | C. Lumley |
| 1948 | Ernest C. Howard | | |
| | Central Riverina FL | | |
| 1949 | Ernest C. Howard | L. K. Smith | H. Tinsley |
| 1950 | V Foley | L. K. Smith | J . G. Peach |
| 1951 | Andy M. O'Neill | A. Hickson | J. G. Peach |
| 1952 | Andy M. O'Neill | Alfred H. Shaw | |
| 1953 | Andy M. O'Neill | Alfred H. Shaw | |
| 1954 | Andy M. O'Neill | Alfred H. Shaw | |
| 1959 | Ernest C. Howard | Alfred H. Shaw | |
| 1960 | Ernest C. Howard | Alfred H. Shaw | |
| 1981 | | George Washington | Toby Kells |
| | Riverina DFL | | |
| 1982 | John Yates | Lex Foley | Malcom Levett |
| 1983 | Frank Gaynor | | |
| Year | President | Secretary | Treasurer |

== Links ==
- Albury & District Football League
- Australian rules football in New South Wales
- Central Hume Football Association
- Coreen & District Football League
- Farrer Football League
- Hume Football Netball League
- Riverina Football Association
- Riverina Football Netball League
- South West Football League (New South Wales)
- Central Riverina FL – "CRFL Weekly Record"
