= Denis Ryan (footballer) =

Australian rules footballer (1916–1980)

Denis 'Dinny' Ryan
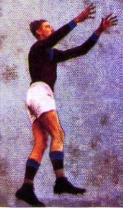

Personal information
- Full name: Denis James Ryan
- Born: 10 July 1916; Albury, New South Wales
- Died: 22 April 1980 (aged 63); Albury, New South Wales
- Original team: Albury Rovers (Albury & DFL)
- Height: 187 cm (6 ft 2 in)
- Weight: 83 kg (183 lb)
- Position: centre half forward / back

Playing career^{1}
Years	Club	Games (Goals)
1935–1939	Fitzroy	70 (65)
- ^{1} Playing statistics correct to the end of 1939.

Career highlights
- 1936 Brownlow Medalist

Denis James Ryan (10 July 1916 – 22 April 1980) was an Australian rules footballer who played for Fitzroy in Victorian Football League (VFL) during the 1930s.

Ryan originally played with the Albury Rovers Football Club as a 15 year and spent three seasons with Albury Rovers and kicked three goals in their 1933 premiership win over Henty Football Club in the Albury & District Football League.

Ryan won the 1934 – Albury & District Football League's best and fairest award, the Stavley Medal, playing for the Albury Rovers Football Club, before heading down to Melbourne to play with Fitzroy.

Ryan debuted in the VFL in 1935, in round one, aged just 18 and started his career at centre half forward, topping Fitzroy's goalkicking in his debut season with 46 goals. He was moved to centre half back the following season and won the 1936 Brownlow Medal, with 26 votes, making it the fifth Brownlow in the previous six years to have gone to a Fitzroy player. In 1936 Ryan won the club's Most Improved Player award, while Haydn Bunton Senior won the Fitzroy FC best and fairest award.

In 1939 after injuring his knee, Ryan joined the army and fought in World War II, serving for four years. He was wounded as one of the "Rats of Tobruk" and later served 18 months on the front line in New Guinea.

Ryan did appear in a practice match for Fitzroy in March 1946, but he never played VFL football after the end of World War Two.

In 1947, Ryan was appointed playing coach of the Howlong Football Club in the Chiltern & District Football Association who were runners up.

In 1948, Ryan coached the Catholic Young Men's Football Club team in the Albury & Border Junior Football Association.
