= Jim Steigenberger =

Australian rules footballer, born 1911

Personal information
- Full name: Jim Steigenberger
- Born: 30 December 1911
- Died: 3 August 1991 (aged 79)
- Original team: Mooroopna
- Height: 183 cm (6 ft 0 in)
- Weight: 86 kg (190 lb)

Playing career^{1}
Years	Club	Games (Goals)
1934	Fitzroy	3 (0)
1936–37	North Melbourne	9 (3)
Total		12 (3)
- ^{1} Playing statistics correct to the end of 1937.

Jim Steigenberger (30 December 1911 – 3 August 1991) was an Australian rules footballer who played with Fitzroy and North Melbourne in the Victorian Football League (VFL).

After commencing the year with North Melbourne, Steigenberger was appointed as captain / coach the Balldale Football Club in 1937 (3rd) and 1938 (3rd) in the Chiltern & District Football Association. He then coached the Brocklesby Football Club to a famous Albury & District Football League premiership against Henty in 1939, after a free kick was awarded on the siren to Wally Crooks, who kicked a goal for Brocklesby to win by two points.

Steigenberger played with Port Melbourne in 1940 and 1941, but missed out on playing in their 1941 VFA premiership, after injuring his ankle in early September, 1941.

Steigenberger enlisted in the Australian Imperial Force (AIF) in Melbourne in June 1940.
