= Mel Rudd =

Australian rules footballer, born 1914

Personal information
- Full name: Melville Rudd
- Born: 28 February 1914
- Died: 19 March 1994 (aged 80)
- Original teams: The Rock, Collingullie, Mangoplah
- Height: 175 cm (5 ft 9 in)
- Weight: 76 kg (168 lb)

Playing career^{1}
Years	Club	Games (Goals)
1935	Fitzroy	5 (1)
- ^{1} Playing statistics correct to the end of 1935.

Mel Rudd (28 February 1914 – 19 March 1994) was an Australian rules footballer who played with Fitzroy in the Victorian Football League (VFL).

Rudd was recruited from the Wagga Australian Rules Football League club, Collingullie, in 1935.
