= Russell Madden (Australian rules footballer) =

Australian rules footballer, born 1910

Personal information
- Full name: Russell Monteith Madden
- Born: 4 June 1910; Traralgon, Victoria
- Died: 18 July 1966 (aged 56); Parkville, Victoria
- Original team: Ashby

Playing career^{1}
Years	Club	Games (Goals)
1929, 1931	Geelong	3 (0)
1932, 1934	Essendon	12 (0)
Total		15 (0)
- ^{1} Playing statistics correct to the end of 1934.

Russell Monteith Madden (4 June 1910 – 18 July 1966) was an Australian rules footballer who played with Geelong and Essendon in the Victorian Football League (VFL).

Madden played with Sandringham in the VFL from 1936 until midway through 1938, when he was cleared to Mangoplah Football Club in June 1938.

Madden was appointed as coach of the Mangoplah Football Club in 1938 and lead them to the 1938 Albury & District Football League premiership before returning to Melbourne.
