= Charlie Kolb =

Australian rules footballer, born 1907

Personal information
- Full name: Charlie Kolb
- Born: 14 May 1907
- Died: 27 February 1994 (aged 86)
- Original team: Albury
- Height: 168 cm (5 ft 6 in)
- Weight: 70 kg (154 lb)

Playing career^{1}
Years	Club	Games (Goals)
1932	Richmond	3 (1)
- ^{1} Playing statistics correct to the end of 1932.

Charlie Kolb (14 May 1907 – 27 February 1994) was an Australian rules footballer who played with Richmond in the Victorian Football League (VFL).

In 1933, Kolb was appointed as captain / coach of the Albury Rovers Football Club in the Albury & District Football League. He led them to the 1933 premiership and also won the association best and fairest medal, the Stavley Medal.
