= Neale Rutzou =

Australian rules footballer

Personal information
- Full name: Neale Kemp Rutzou
- Born: 30 July 1927; Corowa, New South Wales
- Died: 26 April 1984 (aged 56); Wagga Wagga, New South Wales
- Original team: Wagga Wagga
- Height: 183 cm (6 ft 0 in)
- Weight: 86 kg (190 lb)

Playing career^{1}
Years	Club	Games (Goals)
1950	Geelong	2 (0)
- ^{1} Playing statistics correct to the end of 1950.

Neale Kemp Rutzou (30 July 1927 – 26 April 1984) was an Australian rules footballer who played with Geelong in the Victorian Football League (VFL).

Rutzou, a professional runner from Wagga Wagga, made two appearances for Geelong in the 1950 VFL season. He debuted in Geelong's 80 point opening round win over Hawthorn at Glenferrie Oval and played again the following week, when Geelong defeated Footscray at Kardinia Park, by 33 points.

A defender, Rutzou was then kept out of the side with a broken finger and returned to Wagga Wagga mid-season.

Rutzou was runner up in the 1950 Albury & District Football League best and fairest award, the Baz Medal, with Wagga Tigers, who lost the grand final to Culcairn.
