= Mitchell County, New South Wales =

Mitchell New South Wales
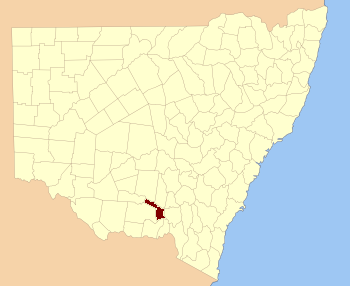
- Location in New South Wales
Lands administrative divisions around Mitchell:
| Cooper | Bourke | Clarendon |
| Urana | Mitchell | Wynyard |
| Urana | Hume | Goulburn |

Mitchell County is one of the 141 cadastral divisions of New South Wales. It contains the town of Collingullie. The Murrumbidgee River is the northern boundary.

Mitchell County is named in honour of the Surveyor-General Sir Thomas Livingstone Mitchell (1792–1855).

== Parishes within this county ==
A full list of parishes found within this county; their current LGA and mapping coordinates to the approximate centre of each location is as follows:

| Parish | LGA | Coordinates |
|---|---|---|
| Arajoel | City of Wagga Wagga | 35°01′54″S 146°50′04″E |
| Ashcroft | Lockhart Shire Council | 35°13′54″S 146°53′04″E |
| Berry Jerry | City of Wagga Wagga | 35°02′54″S 147°00′04″E |
| Birrego | Narrandera Shire Council | 34°56′54″S 146°35′04″E |
| Brewarrina | Narrandera Shire Council | 34°51′54″S 146°45′04″E |
| Buckinbong | Narrandera Shire Council | 34°51′54″S 146°41′04″E |
| Bulgary | City of Wagga Wagga | 35°00′54″S 146°57′04″E |
| Bullenbung | Lockhart Shire Council | 35°07′54″S 147°00′04″E |
| Burke | Lockhart Shire Council | 35°17′54″S 147°10′04″E |
| Burrandana | City of Wagga Wagga | 35°23′54″S 147°22′04″E |
| Coffin Rock | City of Wagga Wagga | 35°21′54″S 147°18′04″E |
| Corobimilla | Narrandera Shire Council | 34°52′54″S 146°23′04″E |
| Cox | Lockhart Shire Council | 35°22′54″S 147°08′04″E |
| Cuddell | Narrandera Shire Council | 34°48′54″S 146°24′04″E |
| Edgehill | Lockhart Shire Council | 35°28′54″S 147°01′04″E |
| Faithfull | Narrandera Shire Council | 34°57′54″S 146°41′04″E |
| Gillenbah | Narrandera Shire Council | 34°44′54″S 146°30′04″E |
| Gobbagaula | Narrandera Shire Council | 34°51′54″S 146°36′04″E |
| Grubben | Lockhart Shire Council | 35°24′54″S 147°00′04″E |
| Hanging Rock | Lockhart Shire Council | 35°15′54″S 147°03′04″E |
| Leitch | Lockhart Shire Council | 35°14′54″S 147°07′04″E |
| Maclean | City of Wagga Wagga | 35°26′54″S 147°15′04″E |
| Mangoplah | City of Wagga Wagga | 35°22′54″S 147°15′04″E |
| Milbrulong | Lockhart Shire Council | 35°18′54″S 146°55′04″E |
| Mimosa | Narrandera Shire Council | 35°00′54″S 146°46′04″E |
| Mundawaddery | Lockhart Shire Council | 35°23′54″S 146°53′04″E |
| Mundowy | City of Wagga Wagga | 35°06′54″S 147°06′04″E |
| Osborne | City of Wagga Wagga | 35°07′54″S 146°54′04″E |
| Pearson | City of Wagga Wagga | 35°15′54″S 147°11′04″E |
| Pulletop | City of Wagga Wagga | 35°26′54″S 147°22′04″E |
| Sandy Creek | City of Wagga Wagga | 35°15′54″S 147°18′04″E |
| Tootool | Lockhart Shire Council | 35°14′54″S 147°00′04″E |
| Uranquinty | City of Wagga Wagga | 35°06′54″S 147°15′04″E |
| Vincent | Lockhart Shire Council | 35°20′54″S 147°00′04″E |
| Wauberrima | City of Wagga Wagga | 34°56′54″S 146°51′04″E |
| Westby | City of Wagga Wagga | 35°26′54″S 147°27′04″E |
| Wood | Narrandera Shire Council | 34°52′54″S 146°30′04″E |
| Yarabee | Narrandera Shire Council | 34°44′54″S 146°26′04″E |
| Yarragundry | City of Wagga Wagga | 35°08′54″S 147°12′04″E |
| Yerong | Lockhart Shire Council | 35°24′54″S 147°05′04″E |
