= Burrandana =

- Town
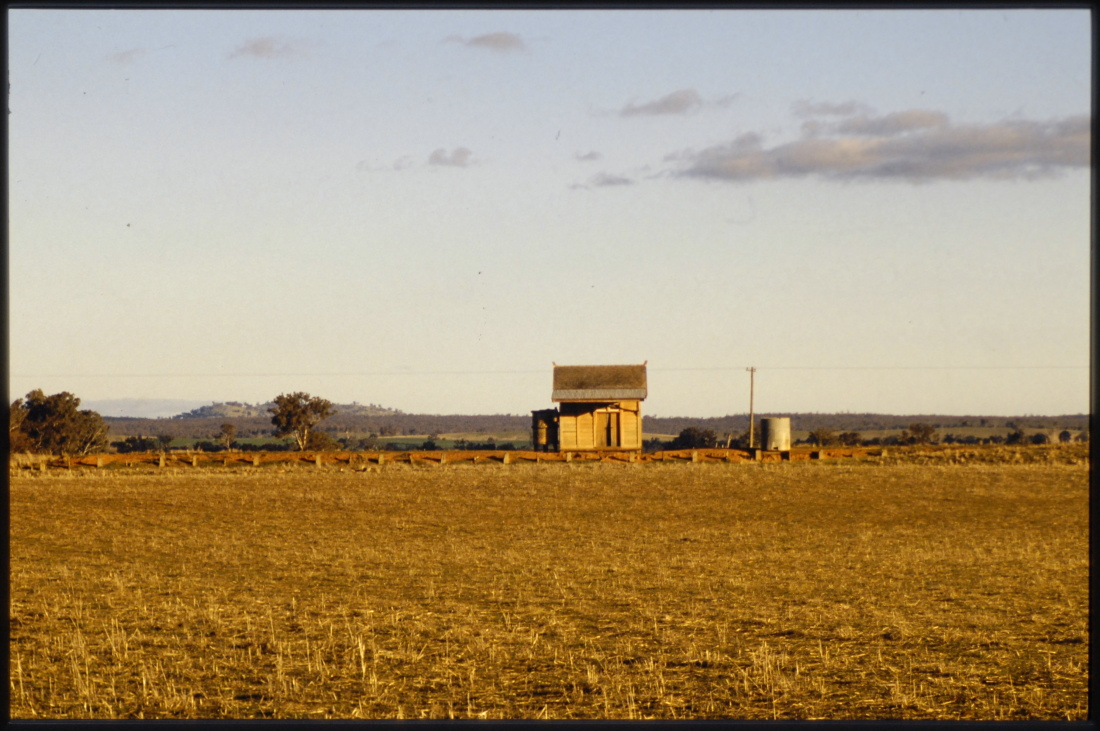
- Burrandana railway station, 1985

- Coordinates: 35°24′50″S 147°20′49″E
- Country: Australia
- State: New South Wales
- LGA: City of Wagga Wagga
- Location: 495 km (308 mi) from Sydney; 42 km (26 mi) from Wagga Wagga; 12 km (7.5 mi) from Mangoplah; 5 km (3.1 mi) from Pulletop

Government
  - State electorate: Wagga Wagga

Population
  - Total: 21 (2016 census)
- Postcode: 2650
- County: Mitchell

Burrandana is a rural locality in the south eastern part of the Riverina. By road it is about five kilometres (3.1 mi) east south-east of Pulletop and nine kilometres (5.6 mi) north of Mangoplah.
