= Ted Hill (footballer) =

Australian rules footballer, born 1914

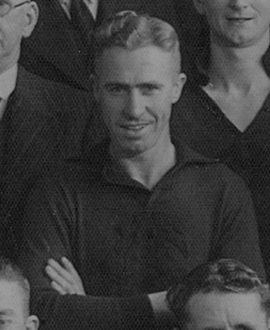
- Hill during his Fitzroy career

Personal information
- Full name: Ted Hill
- Born: 15 January 1914
- Died: 1 July 1986 (aged 72)
- Original team: Coburg (VFA)
- Height: 187 cm (6 ft 2 in)
- Weight: 92 kg (203 lb)
- Position: Back Pocket

Playing career^{1}
Years	Club	Games (Goals)
1939	Collingwood	2 (0)
1940, 1942–45	Fitzroy	20 (2)
Total		22 (2)
- ^{1} Playing statistics correct to the end of 1945.

Ted Hill (15 January 1914 - 1 July 1986) was an Australian rules footballer who played with Collingwood and Fitzroy in the Victorian Football League (VFL).

Hill joined Victorian Football Association (VFA) club Coburg as a 16 year old in 1930, spending three years with them, before joining Collingwood.

Hill was captain/coach of Kalgoorlie Railways in their 1948 premiership season, then in 1949, he coached Yallourn to a premiership in the Central Gippsland Football League. In 1951 he was appointed captain and coach of Wedderburn in the North Central Football League and they won the premiership

Hill was appointed as captain / coach of Culcairn in 1952 and lead them to the 1952 Albury & District Football League premiership.
