= Bert Clay =

Australian rules footballer, born 1915

Personal information
- Full name: Albert Henry Clay
- Born: 7 May 1915; Bendigo, Victoria
- Died: 30 April 1972 (aged 56); Fitzroy North, Victoria
- Original team: Henty
- Height: 193 cm (6 ft 4 in)
- Weight: 94 kg (207 lb)

Playing career^{1}
| Years | Club | Games (Goals) |
| 1940–1951 | Fitzroy | 157 (48) |
- ^{1} Playing statistics correct to the end of 1951.

Albert Henry Clay (7 May 1915 – 30 April 1972) was an Australian rules footballer who played for Fitzroy in the Victorian Football League (VFL). His twin brother Ivor also played with him in the Fitzroy side.

In 1939, Bert and his identical twin brother, Ivor trained with North Melbourne under coach, Keith Forbes, but both missed out on the being selected in the final list and returned to Henty, NSW.

Originally from the Hunter Football Club in the Lockington Football Association, Bert was recruited from Henty, where he played in their 1937 premiership and was runner up in the 1938 Albury & District Football League's best and fairest award (lost on a count back) then won the 1939 award. Clay played in Henty's losing 1939 grand final side against Brocklesby.

Clay played as a ruckman and was instrumental in the club's 1944 Grand Final victory, rated by his opponent Jack Dyer as the best on ground.

Clay retired from VFL football at 36 years of age, after 152 games.
