= Ivor Clay =

Australian rules footballer and cricketer

Personal information
- Full name: Ivor Thomas Clay
- Born: 7 May 1915; Bendigo, Victoria
- Died: 12 August 1958 (aged 43); Essendon, Victoria
- Original teams: Hunter, Henty
- Height: 193 cm (6 ft 4 in)
- Weight: 90 kg (198 lb)

Playing career^{1}
Years	Club	Games (Goals)
1941–1946	Fitzroy	31 (19)
- ^{1} Playing statistics correct to the end of 1946.

Ivor Thomas Clay (7 May 1915 – 12 August 1958) was an Australian rules footballer who played with Fitzroy in the Victorian Football League (VFL) during the 1940s and also a first-class cricketer for Tasmania.

== Football career ==
The Clay twins, Ivor and Bert were originally from Elmore and played with the Hunter Football Club in the Lockington Football Association prior to being recruited from the New South Wales town of Henty, where he played in their 1937 Albury & District Football League premiership. Clay also played in Henty's losing 1939 Albury & District Football League grand final side against Brocklesby prior to playing with Fitzroy.

Clay kicked 13 goals in his debut season at Fitzroy, in 1941, after making his debut in their round five game against Richmond. He was a semi regular in the team again the following year but from 1943 to 1946 his appearances were sporadic. As a result, he missed out on a place in Fitzroy's drought breaking 1944 VFL premiership team, which his twin brother Bert played in.

In 1947, Ivor was appointed as captain / coach of the Associated Pulp and Paper Makers' (APPM) team in the North West Football Union, Tasmania. Clay was a playing member of their 1949 premiership win against Ulverstone.

== Cricket career ==
Clay played 60 first eleven games for the Fitzroy Cricket Club in the Melbourne District Cricket competition between 1941/42 and 1945/46 cricket seasons as a right-arm fast-medium bowler.

Once his VFL career was over, Clay went to Tasmania to coach football and ended up playing three first-class cricket matches for the state, as a right-arm fast-medium bowler. He took nine wickets at 37.77, among them Test opener Colin McDonald.

In March, 1948 Clay represented Tasmania against the Australian First Eleven, at Launceston, as "Clay wrecks Test Team", taking 5/63 from 15 overs in an outstanding bowling performance.

Five of his wickets came on his debut when he opened the bowling against Victoria at the Melbourne Cricket Ground in January, 1950 which included figures of 3 for 64.

Clay returned to Melbourne and played 35 first eleven games for the Essendon Cricket Club between 1953/54 and 1955/56 cricket seasons.
