= Vin Smith =

Australian rules footballer

Personal information
- Full name: Alfred Vincent Smith
- Born: 23 January 1914; Hawthorn, Victoria
- Died: 17 February 1995 (aged 81); Dimboola, Victoria
- Original team: Camberwell
- Height: 180 cm (5 ft 11 in)
- Weight: 70 kg (154 lb)

Playing career^{1}
Years	Club	Games (Goals)
1935	Hawthorn	11 (11)
- ^{1} Playing statistics correct to the end of 1935.

Alfred Vincent Smith (23 January 1914 – 17 February 1995) was an Australian rules footballer who played with Hawthorn in the Victorian Football League (VFL).

Hawthorn granted Smith a clearance to the Brocklesby Football Club, NSW where they finish 3rd in 1937 and 4th in 1938 in the Albury & District Football League with Smith as their captain / coach.

Smith was runner up Albury & DFL best and fairest award in 1937 and finished 3rd in the 1938 medal.

Smith played with Sandringham Football Club in 1939 and 1940, prior to enlisting with the AIF in World War Two.
