= Pulletop, New South Wales =

Pulletop
- Town
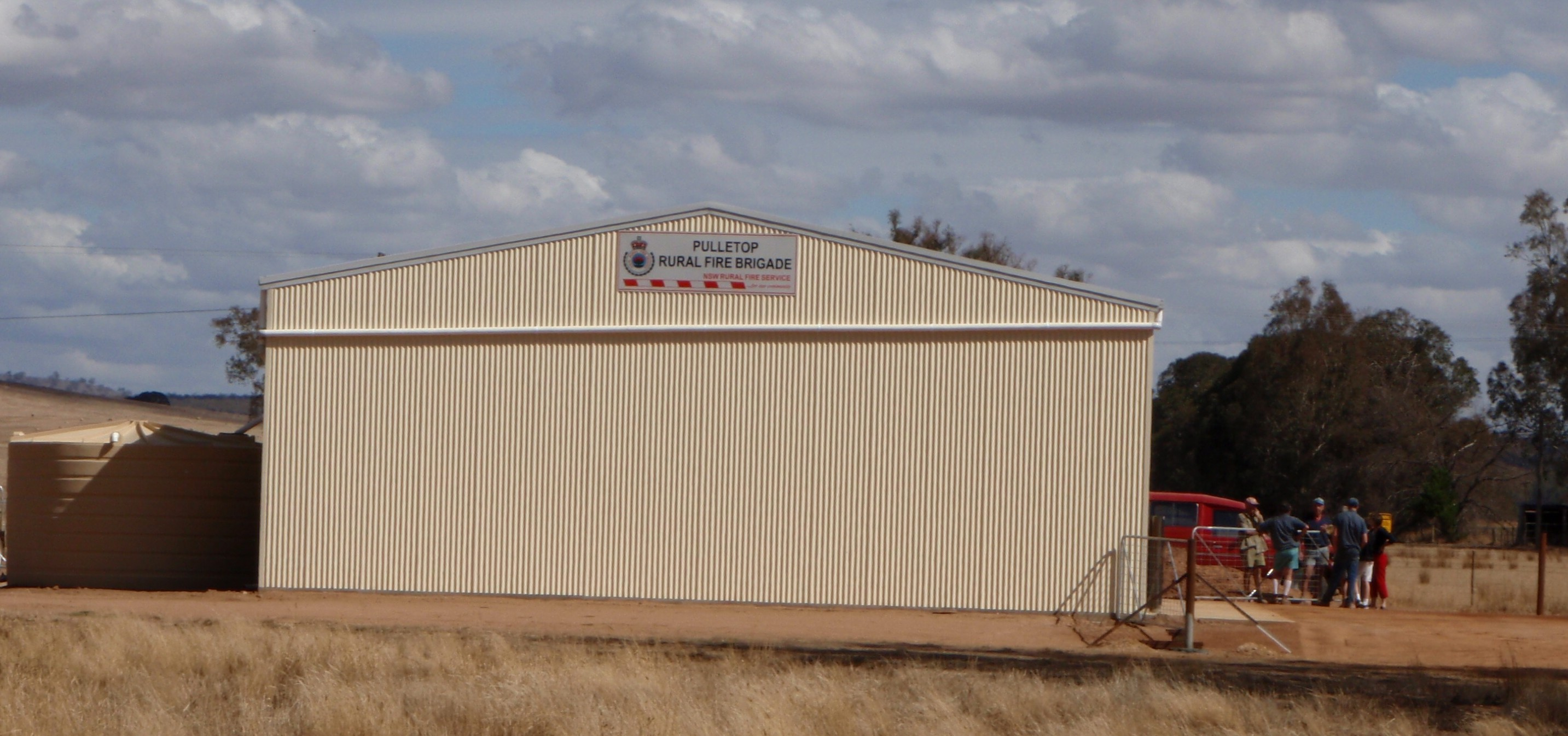
- Pulletop Fire Brigade Shed

- Coordinates: 35°27′03″S 147°23′24″E
- Country: Australia
- State: New South Wales
- LGA: City of Wagga Wagga
- Location: 5 km (3.1 mi) from Burrandana; 9 km (5.6 mi) from Westby

Government
  - State electorate: Wagga Wagga

Population
  - Total: 64 (SAL 2021)
- Postcode: 2650
- County: Mitchell

Pulletop is a rural locality in the south eastern part of the Riverina - it used to be called Pullitop. It is situated by road, about 5 kilometres east south-east of Burrandana and 9 kilometres north of Westby.

== See also ==
- Pulletop bushfire
