= Marrar =

Marrar is a Jatt tribe of Pakistan and India. According to the book A Glossary of the Tribes and Castes of the Punjab and North-West Frontier Province, Marrars were Sombansi Rajputs. Many Rajput tribes during wars and famine began to cultivate their lands and hence began being termed as Jatts. The Punjabi tribe of Marrar is not to be confused with the south Indian tribe Marar.

Marrars are to found in Gujrat District In Pakistan Punjab and in India Punjab.

== History ==
The Marrars in Gujrat say they came into the Punjab from Samana, India in the service of Moghul King Akbar who settled them in the Gujrat District of Punjab.
