= Mangoplah =

Mangoplah New South Wales
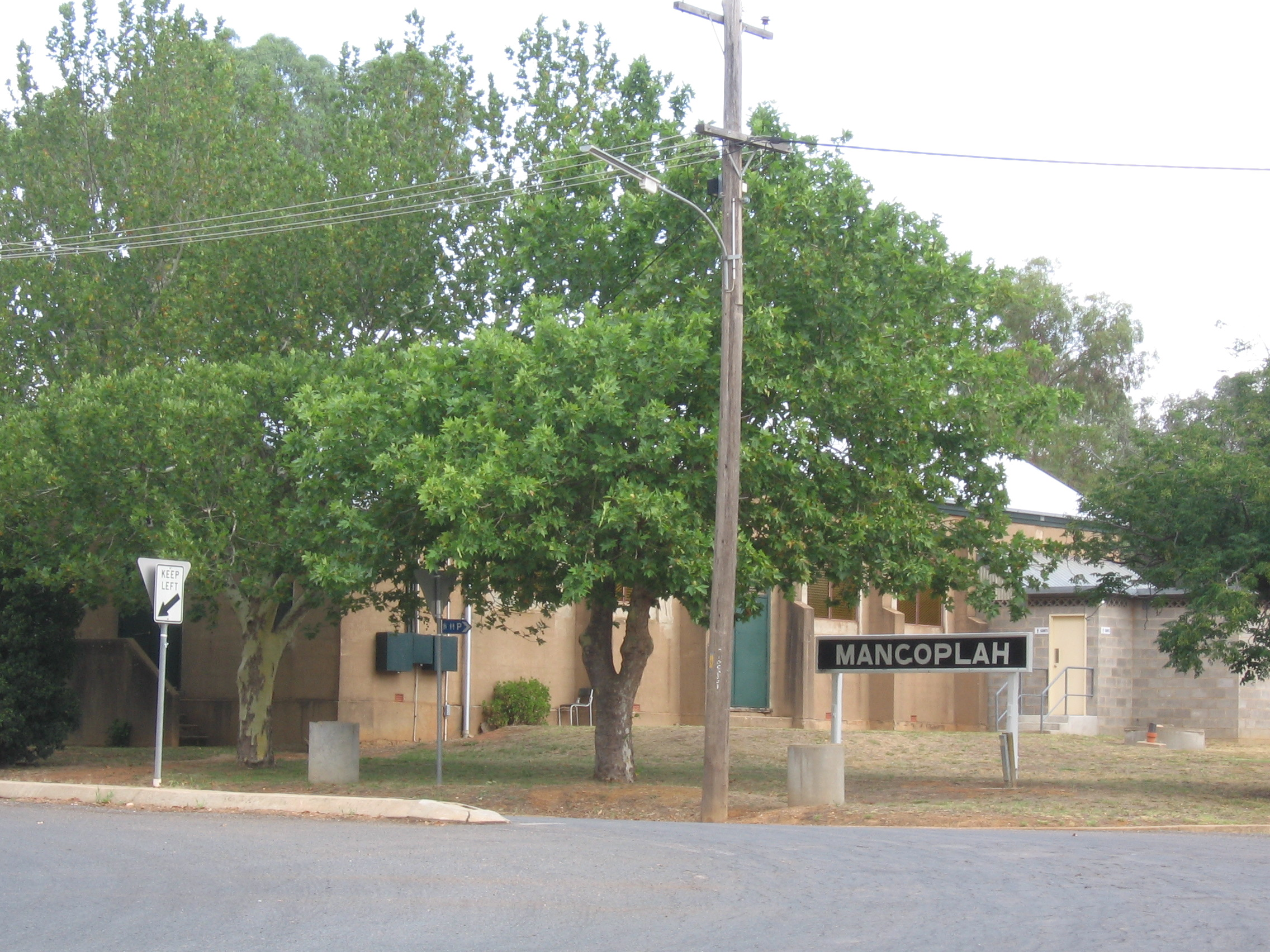
- Mangoplah Hall

- Coordinates: 35°22′54″S 147°14′34″E
- Population: 309 (2016 census)
- Established: 1850's
- Postcode(s): 2652
- Elevation: 276 m (906 ft)
- Time zone: AEST (UTC+10)
  - Summer (DST): AEST (UTC+11)
- Location: 36 km (22 mi) from Wagga Wagga; 18 km (11 mi) from The Rock; 9 km (6 mi) from Burrandana
- LGA(s): City of Wagga Wagga
- County: Mitchell
- State electorate(s): Wagga Wagga
- Federal division(s): Riverina

Mangoplah /ˈmæŋɡoʊplɑː/ is a town approximately 36 kilometres (22 mi) south of Wagga Wagga in the Riverina region of New South Wales, Australia. At the 2016 census, Mangoplah had a population of 309. The name of the town is believed to mean "Kooris singing" in the Wiradjuri aboriginal language.

== History ==
The first bridge in Mangoplah was built in 1862 from funding of £700 by the NSW Government over Phillitop & Old Man Creek.

In 1865, A parcel of Crown land in Mangoplah was allocated for public purposes to the Wesleyan Church.

In 1866, Thomas Jones was the Licensee of the Mangoplah Inn and was sold to Mrs Ann Hyland in 1868.

Around 1880, the Mangoplah Inn, became known as Richard Curry's Mangoplah Inn.

During the 1860s and 1870s, Mangoplah use to hold an annual horse race meeting, on the anniversary of the colony in January each year, according to annual custom, at Mrs Hyland's Mangoplah Inn.

Mangoplah Post Office opened on 1 September 1880, closed in 1885 and reopened in 1911.

In 1880, a gold bearing reef, said to be very rich was discovered in Mangoplah, with several claims pegged out.

In 1913, gold mining took place at Warbling Springs property, with three shafts drilled to 100 feet, with a 10-foot reef showing gold freely throughout.

The club's first documented game of Australian rules football by the Mangoplah Football Club was in August 1913 against Cookardinia.

In 1914, the Mangoplah School was opened.

In 1915, three tennis courts were constructed at the Mangoplah Recreation Reserve and the construction of the North Mangoplah School was completed.

The new rail line from The Rock to Mangoplah was commenced in 1923 and the Railway Station operated from 1925 to 1956. When a catastrophic bushfire in 1952 gutted the Mangoplah Railway Station, it eventually forced its closure.

The Mangoplah Hotel was built in 1924 by Sam Heron and the grain silo was built in 1924 too.

St. Mark's Church of England Church was opened in 1926 by the Bishop of Riverina, Dr. Halse.

Mangoplah was formerly within the Shire of Kyeamba from 1906 until 1 January 1981 when the Shire was amalgamated with the Shire of Mitchell into the City of Wagga Wagga.

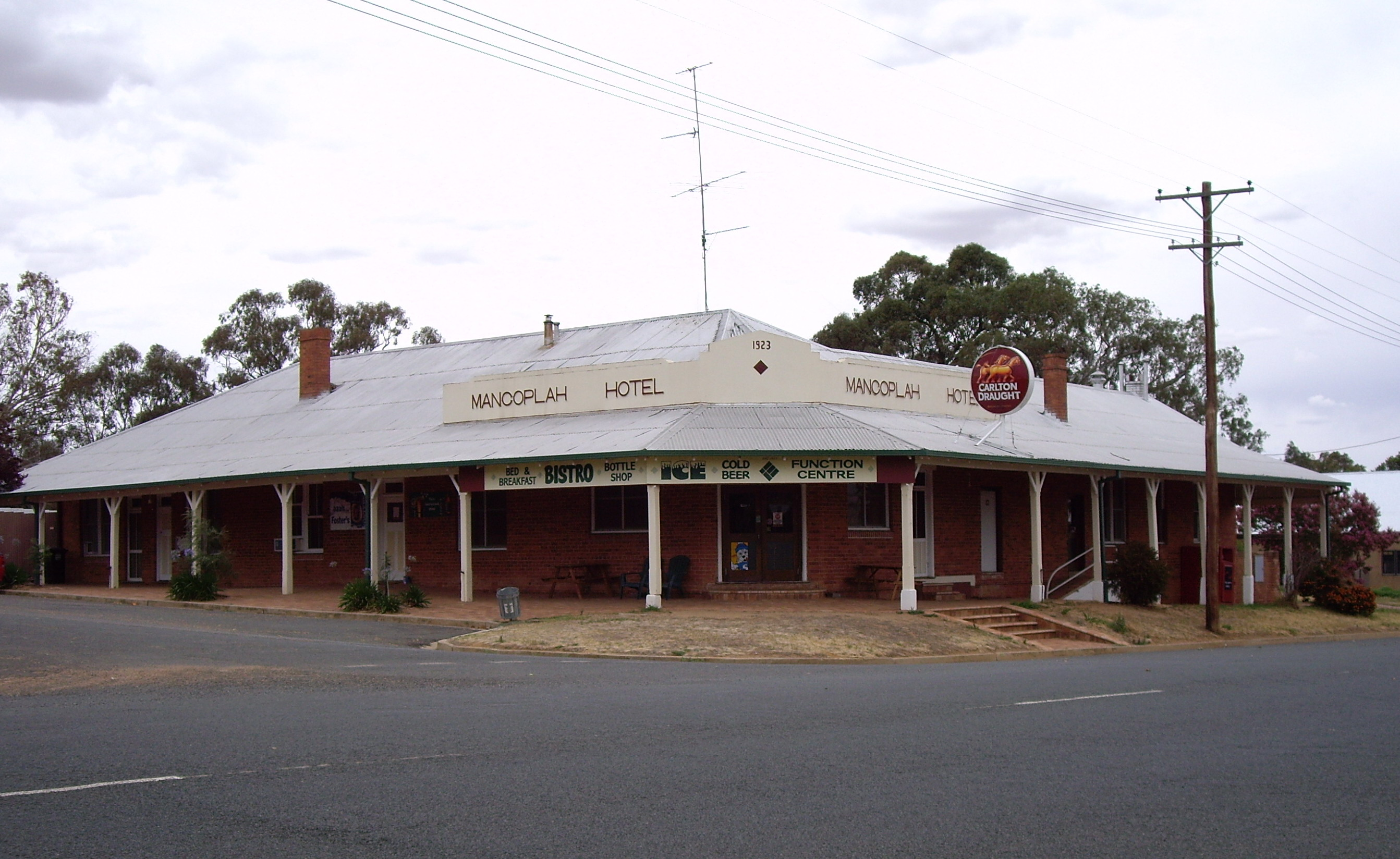
Mangoplah Hotel

== Today ==
The town contains a pub, hall, two churches, a recreation reserve, a football & netball club, a general store and a rural produce distributor. The primary school in Mangoplah operated until its closure in 2013.

Mangoplah is located 10 kilometres (6.2 mi) west of Livingstone National Park.
