= Del Valle (surname) =

Del Valle is a topographic surname literally meaning "from the valley" in Spanish. Notable people with the surname include:

== A ==
- Aaron del Valle, Chicago Police officer and politician
- Ada Rosa del Valle Itúrrez de Cappellini or Ada Itúrrez de Cappellini (born 1959), Argentine politician
- Agripina Montes del Valle (c. 1844–1912), Colombian poet, writer, and intellectual
- Ana Isabel de Palacio y del Valle or Ana Palacio (born 1948), Spanish lawyer and politician
- Andreina del Valle Pinto Pérez or Andreina Pinto (born 1991), Venezuelan Olympic swimmer
- Andrés del Valle (1833–1888), former President of El Salvador
- Antonio del Valle, several people
- Alexandre del Valle (born 1968), Franco-Italian politologist, writer, professor, columnist, and political commentator
- Argentino del Valle Larrabure (1932–1975), Argentine military officer
- Aristóbulo del Valle (1845–1896), Argentinian lawyer and politician
- Agustín Salas del Valle (born 1964), Mexican serial murderer
- Ayron del Valle (born 1989), Colombian professional footballer
- Silveno Laurente Del Valle Jr., (September 19, 2004) Filipino wants to become an international model

== C ==
- Carlos Yushimito del Valle (born 1977), Peruvian writer of Japanese descent
- Cristina del Valle (born 1960), Spanish singer and activist

== D ==
- Danielys Del Valle García Buitrago, female track and road cyclist from Venezuela
- David Del Valle, journalist, columnist, film historian, and radio and television commentator on films
- David García del Valle, judo paralympic athlete from Spain
- Dennis Del Valle (born 1989), Puerto Rican volleyball player
- Desiree del Valle, Filipina actress

== E ==
- Emilio del Valle Escalante or Emil' Keme, Guatemalan/K'iche Maya professor and researcher in Indigenous literatures
- Emilio del Valle, Spanish politician
- Emilio Menéndez del Valle, Spanish politician
- Enrique del Valle, Ecuadorian judoka
- Estrella del Valle, Mexican poet

== F ==
- Fe del Valle, Cuban civil rights activist
- Fernando Alfonso Yznaga del Valle or Fernando Yznaga (1850–1901), Cuban American banker
- Fernando del Valle, American operatic tenor

== G ==
- Gabriel del Valle (born 1970), Argentine football manager and former player
- Gladys del Valle Requena (born 1952), Venezuelan politician
- Guillermo León Teillier del Valle or Guillermo Teillier (1943–2023), Chilean politician, educator, and writer
- Guillermo del Valle, Mexican politician

== I ==
- Ignacia de Loyola de Palacio y del Valle Lersundi or Loyola de Palacio (1950–2006), Spanish politician

== J ==
- João Guilherme Del Valle, Brazilian entrepreneur, founder of EBANX
- José del Valle, several people
- Jorge del Valle (born 1961), Cuban water polo player
- Jorge Iván del Valle (born 1991), Colombian human rights activist, open water swimmer, and a graphic designer
- Juan del Valle, several people
- Julio Rosado del Valle (1922–2008), Puerto Rican abstract expressionist

== L ==
- Lilia del Valle (1928–2013), Mexican actress
- Lou Del Valle (born 1968), American boxer
- Lucretia del Valle Grady (1892–1972), political activist, suffragette, and actress
- Luis Del Valle (born 1987), Puerto Rican professional boxer
- Luisa del Valle Silva (1896–1962), Venezuelan poet

== M ==
- Manuel Castro y del Valle (born 1944), Mexican politician
- Manuel del Valle (1939–2020), Spanish lawyer, politician
- Manuela Vilar del Valle (born 1944), Uruguayan field hockey player
- María Teresita del Valle Colombo de Acevedo or María Colombo de Acevedo (1957–2021), Argentine politician
- María Eugenia del Valle (1928–1994), Chilean-Bolivian historian, researcher, and university professor
- María Remedios del Valle (ca. 1768–1847), Afro-Argentine camp follower turned soldier
- Martha Del Valle (born 1988), Mexican dressage rider
- Martín del Valle (born 1988), Peruvian badminton player
- Maurice del Valle (1883–1965), French ice hockey player
- Mayda Del Valle (born 1978), American slam poet
- Melissa Del Valle, American multiple champion in women's boxing
- Menchu Álvarez del Valle, Spanish radio journalist
- Miguel del Valle, American politician

== N ==
- Nelson del Valle, Puerto Rican politician

== P ==
- Pedro del Valle (1893–1978), USMC General
- Pedro Núñez del Valle (1597–1649), Spanish painter
- Pompeyo del Valle, Honduran poet and journalist

== R ==
- Rafael del Valle (1908–1973), Chilean film and theatre actor
  - Rafael del Valle (poet) (1847–1917), Puerto Rican-Spanish poet
  - Rafael del Valle (boxer) (born 1967), Puerto Rican boxer
- Ramón del Valle-Inclán y de la Peña, Spanish dramatist, novelist
- Raúl del Valle (1908–1973),
- Rodulfo del Valle (1871–1948) was Mayor of Ponce, Puerto Rico

== S ==
- Santiago del Valle, Mexican hacendado and government official
- Sara Del Valle, mathematical epidemiologist
- Sergio del Valle Jiménez (1927–2007), Cuban military and government official
- Stephanie Del Valle, Puerto Rican musician

== T ==
- Teresa del Valle (1937–2025), Spanish anthropologist

== Y ==
- Ygnacio del Valle (1808–1880), Californio ranchero and politician
- Yonathan Del Valle (born 1990), Venezuelan professional footballer
- Ysabel del Valle (1837–1905), American philanthropist and rancho owner

== Fictional ==
- Clara del Valle (later Davis/David) and Mara Del Valle (after Davis/David), characters in Philippine drama series Mara Clara (1992 TV series) and Mara Clara (2010 TV series)

== See also ==
- Valle (surname)
