= Aaron del Valle =

Aaron del Valle, a Chicago Police officer, was a member of the Hispanic Democratic Organization (HDO), a political action committee (PAC), officially started in 1993, to aid political power for the Hispanic community in Chicago and throughout Illinois.

== 2007 election campaign ==
Del Valle was a candidate for the office of 25th Ward Alderman of Chicago on February 27, 2007. He was one of five candidates vying to unseat the current Alderman Daniel Solis. During the campaign, del Valle did not make any public appearances regarding his candidacy. He did receive 329 votes placing him in 5th place with 4.8% of the total vote.

25th Ward Alderman for the City of Chicago
| Year | Winner | Votes | Pct | Opponent | Votes | Pct | Opponent | Votes | Pct | Opponent | Votes | Pct | Opponent | Votes | Pct | Opponent | Votes | Pct | Opponent | Votes | Pct |
| 2007 | Daniel Solis | 3522 | 51.4% | Cuahutemoc Morfin | 1535 | 22.4% | Juan M Soliz | 627 | 9.2% | Martha Padilla | 550 | 8.0% | Aaron del Valle | 329 | 4.8% | Joe D Acevedo | 219 | 4.3% | Ambrosio Medrano | Disqualified | Votes Not Counted |

== Controversies ==
In 2006, a Federal investigation was launched into hiring practices at Chicago City Hall. HDO and other political groups allegedly have had influence over the city's hiring system and political workers allegedly have been rewarded with city jobs and promotions.

Del Valle is alleged to have assisted Al Sanchez, an HDO leader, in coordinating HDO activities and was charged with perjury for allegedly lying to the federal grand jury about his HDO activities. Del Valle was considered Sanchez's lieutenant in the HDO organization.
