= Rafael del Valle =

Rafael del Valle may refer to:

- Rafael del Valle (poet) (1847–1917), Puerto Rican-Spanish poet
- Rafael del Valle (boxer) (born 1967), Puerto Rican boxer
