= Farhad Khoiee-Abbasi =

American activist

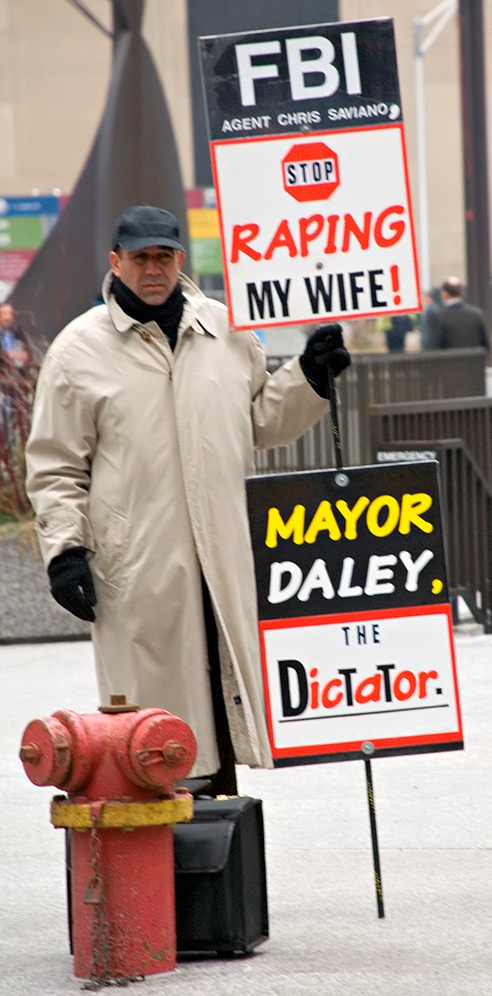
Farhad Khoiee-Abbasi protests in Chicago's Daley Plaza, across the street from City Hall.

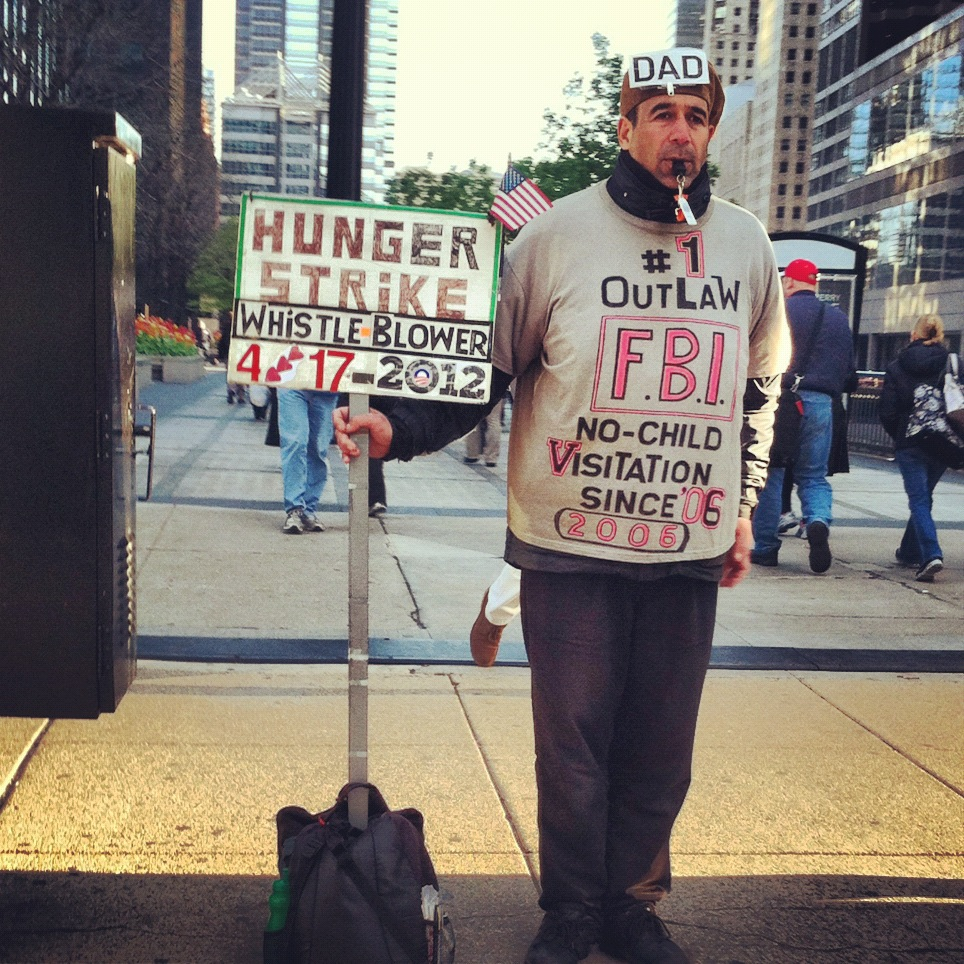
Protesting across the street from Union Station in front of CDW Plaza.

Farhad Khoiee-Abbasi is a public protester who has become known in Chicago as "the FBI sign guy," and sometimes as simply "The Sign Guy". He has also gone on hunger strikes.

== Background ==
In 2006, Khoiee-Abbasi began standing near the northwest corner of Daley Plaza outside of Chicago City Hall, holding a sign that read "FBI Agent Chris Saviano, stop raping my wife!" Soon, he added other signs to his board, most of which denounce former Chicago Mayor Richard M. Daley, former U.S. Attorney General Alberto Gonzales, former Presidents George W. Bush and Joe Biden, and U.S. Senator Dick Durbin of Illinois. He stands outside of city hall every weekday, from about 6:00am until about 3:00pm. He has also been photographed holding his signs on Capitol Hill in Washington D.C., and in New York's Times Square.

In 2011, he started loudly blowing a plastic whistle at regular intervals.

== Coverage ==
Little is known about Khoiee-Abbasi beyond his physical appearance (originally a groomed, well-dressed man who always wore expensive suits and ties), the information on his signs and on flyers he passes out from time to time, and what court documents say about him. It is known that he was involved in extended and contentious divorce proceedings. He generally remains silent when questioned by anyone. He has also used signs asking Barack Obama to spare his only child. The text of flyers he has handed out indicates he is an engineer by trade and that the "FBI Agent" Chris Saviano he accuses of raping his wife and running a prostitution ring also happens to be the son of a vice president of his former employer.

Khoiee-Abbasi has become a popular fixture among photographers on flickr, and in blogs.

By October 2011, Khoiee-Abbasi had stopped wearing his suits and ties and started wearing several layers of hoodies, with an outer shirt containing yet another anti-FBI protest message.

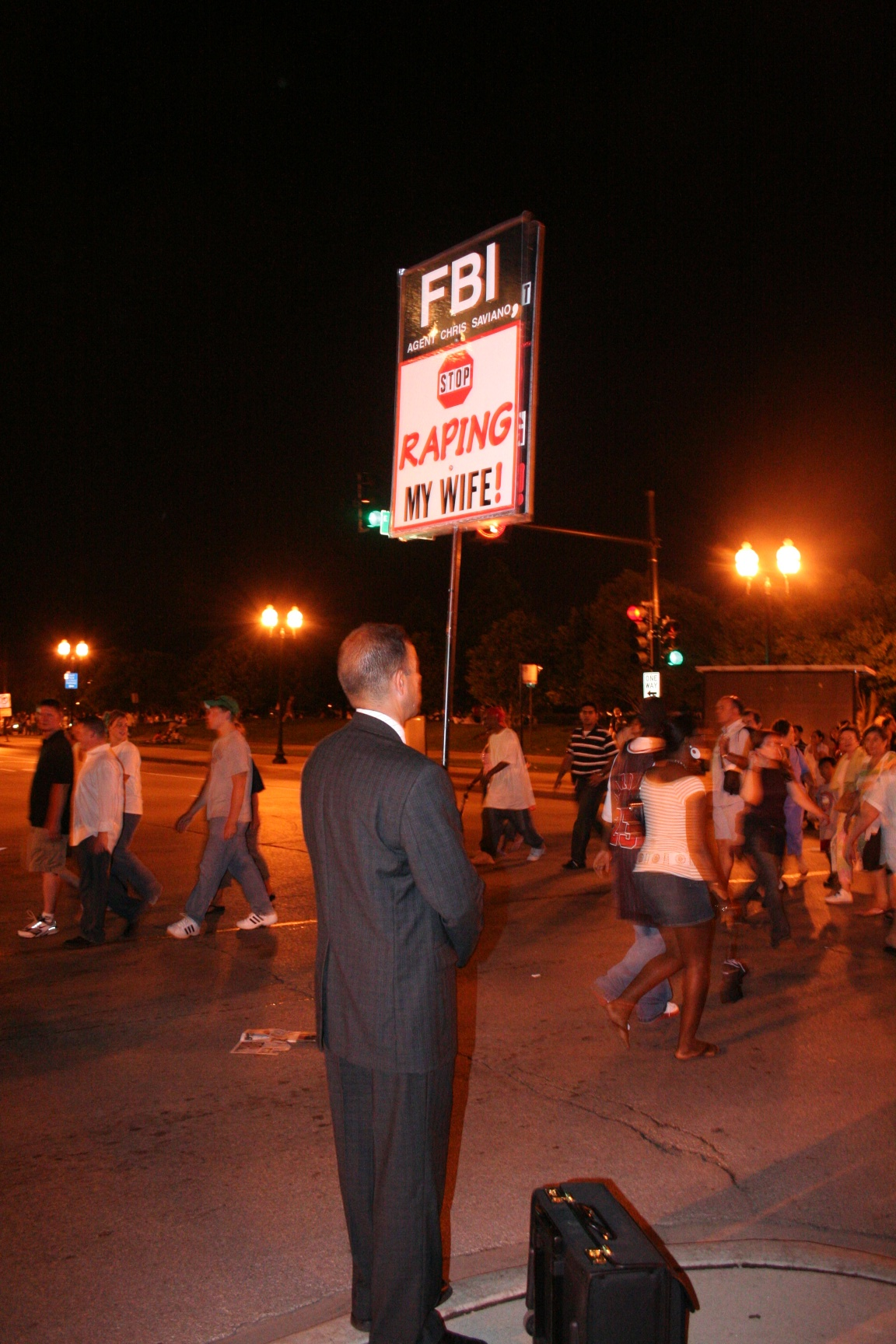
