= Nueva Era =

Nueva Era may refer to:

- Nueva Era, Ilocos Norte, a municipality in Philippines
- Nueva era (Yuri album), 1993
- Nueva era (Amistades Peligrosas album), 1997
- Nueva Era Basket Club, a basketball club in Equatorial Guinea
