= HDO =

HDO may refer to:

== Airports ==
- HDO, IATA code for Hindon Airport in India
- South Texas Regional Airport at Hondo in the United States

== Other ==
- Hispanic Democratic Organization, United States, a PAC
- Hydrodeoxygenation, removing oxygen from compounds
- Semiheavy water, replacing hydrogen-1 with deuterium
- Hilversumsche Draadlooze Omroep, original name for Dutch broadcaster AVRO
