= El Encanto fire =

1961 arson attack in Havana, Cuba

Coordinates: 23.1369°N 82.3630°W

- Part of Operation Mongoose (alleged)
- Location: Havana, Cuba
- Date: April 13, 1961; 7:00 pm
- Target: El Encanto (department store)
- Attack type: Arson, terrorist attack
- Weapon: C-4 explosives
- Deaths: 1 (Fe del Valle)
- Injuries: 18
- Perpetrator: Carlos González Vidal
- Motive: Anti-Fidel Castro sabotage, political destabilization

The El Encanto fire was a terrorist arson attack that destroyed a department store in central Havana, Cuba on 13 April 1961.

== History ==
El Encanto was the largest department store in Cuba, with five retail storeys, originally built in 1888, and situated on the corner of Galiano and San Rafael in Old Havana. Before the Cuban Revolution, it had been privately owned, but in 1959 it was nationalized. In 1961, it had about 930 employees. On 9 April 1961, a bomb exploded outside the store, near the main entrance, resulting in broken windows of several stores on the same street.

== Incident ==
At 6:00 pm on 13 April 1961, the store closed as usual. At about 7:00 pm, two incendiary devices exploded in the tailoring department. The next day, the charred body of Fe del Valle was found in the rubble, other casualties being recorded as 18 people injured. Fe del Valle had been a supervisor in the children's department, and had evidently been attempting to recover money donated to the Federation of Cuban Women for the construction of a daycare center for children of store employees; she had become trapped and was overcome by dense smoke.

== Police investigation ==
At about midnight on 13 April 1961, in the district of Baracoa Beach, west of Havana, militiamen observed lights being flashed from land towards the sea. Nearby houses were searched, and Carlos González Vidal was recognized by an officer as an employee of the store, in its record department. He was arrested and transferred to State Security, where colonel Oscar Gámez identified him as a principal suspect. Carlos González confessed to the action of setting the two incendiary bombs, and provided details of the devices, events and people involved in assisting him.

He recounted that Jorge Camellas (a.k.a. "Cawy"), a CIA agent, had been infiltrated into Cuba with a consignment of C-4 plastic explosives from Miami. Mario Pombo Matamoros, chief of the Movimiento Revolucionario del Pueblo (MRP, or People's Revolutionary Movement), outlined the arson plan to Carlos, who had been recruited by his uncle Reynold González, CIA agent and a leader of the MRP. At about 2:00 pm on 13 April 1961, via Dalia Jorge, Arturo Martínez Pagalday supplied Carlos with two sets of C-4 explosive in packs of Eden cigarettes. After the store closed at 6:00 pm, Carlos planted the devices within bolts of cloth in the tailoring department, then departed with the intention of escaping by boat that night. Carlos González Vidal was later tried, sentenced to death and executed by firing squad.

== Legacy ==
The former site of the department store is now the location of the Fe del Valle park.

== See also ==
- Operation Mongoose
- Bay of Pigs Invasion
