= Nueva era (Amistades Peligrosas album) =

Nueva Era

Studio album by Amistades Peligrosas
- Released: 1997
- Genre: Pop
- Label: EMI Music Spain

Amistades Peligrosas chronology
La profecía (1996)	Nueva Era (1997)	La larga espera (2003)

Nueva era is the 1997 fourth album by Amistades Peligrosas which went platinum in Spain. Three singles were released: "Nada que perder", "Quítame este velo", and "Más circo y más pan".

== Track listing ==
No.	Título	Duración
1	Nueva era*	2:23
2	Nada que perder	4:14
3	Más circo y más pan	3:50
4	O pala o escuela	4:04
5	Mar como el mar	2:36
6	Haberlas hailas	4:22
7	Quítame este velo	4:45
8	Menina das favelas	3:25
9	Los restos de Santiago	4:34
10	Aïcha (cover of the song by Khaled)	4:28
11	Apunta, dispara	5:05
12	Nueva era II*	2:03

- (*) - instrumental
