= Maurice del Valle =

French ice hockey player

- Born: 23 April 1883; Paris, France
- Died: 12 September 1965 (aged 82); Paris, France
- Position: Goaltender
- Caught: Left
- National team: France
- Playing career: 1905–1932

Alfred Marie Maurice Napoléon François de Paule del Valle (23 April 1883 – 12 September 1965) was a French ice hockey player. He competed in the men's tournament at the 1924 Winter Olympics.
