= Sara Del Valle =

Mathematical epidemiologist

Sara Yemimah De Valle
- Education: New Jersey Institute of Technology (BS, MS); University of Iowa (Ph.D)
- Known for: Epidemiology modeling
- Scientific career
- Workplaces: Los Alamos National Laboratory
- Thesis: Effects of behavioral changes and mixing patterns in mathematical models for smallpox epidemics (2005)

Sara Yemimah Del Valle is a senior scientist and mathematical epidemiologist at Los Alamos National Laboratory (LANL). Named as a 2024 Laboratory Fellow, Del Valle leads the Los Alamos Laboratory Fusion Team, where she combines internet data with satellite imagery to forecast disease outbreaks. During the COVID-19 pandemic Del Valle created a computational model that could predict the spread of COVID-19 around the United States.

== Education ==
Del Valle attended the New Jersey Institute of Technology, where she studied applied mathematics. Here she was awarded the Excellence in Mathematics Award in 1996. She earned her bachelor's degree in 2001. For her graduate studies she moved to the University of Iowa, where she developed mathematical models to describe outbreaks of smallpox. She showed that the spread of smallpox is particularly sensitive to how rapidly people self-isolate. She developed a differential equation that could describe the spread, which revealed that the epidemic size depended on how quickly the population developed immunity. After completing her doctorate in 2005, Del Valle joined the LANL as a postdoctoral researcher. Her early worked involved modelling the spread of severe acute respiratory syndrome (SARS) in Toronto, and accurately predicted the peak and number of people who would be infected.

== Research and career ==
Del Valle was appointed a permanent staff member at LANL after completing her postdoctoral research. Her research involves the development of mathematical and computational models to mitigate the spread of viruses. She has shown that it is possible to use social media to predict epidemics, which includes searching social media platforms for terms such as vaccine or mask as well as capturing public sentiment. These findings are used by Del Valle in predictive agent-based models. Alongside the computational models, Del Valle has developed algorithms that can quantify their uncertainty. She was appointed lead of the pandemic project at the National Infrastructure Simulation and Analysis Center.

In 2012 Del Valle studied the economic benefits of wearing face masks during the 2009 swine flu pandemic. She predicted that an unmitigated pandemic could cause over $800 billion of damage to the United States economy. Her estimate made use of earnings, costs associated with staying in hospital and loses in income due to illness. Del Valle demonstrated that if face masks were used by half of the population, economic losses of up to $573 billion could be avoided.

Del Valle studied the ways that Wikipedia can be used to monitor for disease outbreaks. Making use of the Western African Ebola virus epidemic as a model, Del Valle showed that Wikipedia had the potential to be an effective, community driven monitoring system to identify emerging diseases as well as storing and sharing data. She used natural language processing to capture critical information and case counts from Wikipedia articles. Del Valle believes that the history sections of Wikipedia pages not only gauge public interest, but also provide chronological information on disease incidence. Del Valle has combined internet data from Wikipedia and social media with satellite imagery and climate information to improve disease forecasting. For mosquito-borne diseases, satellite data can provide information on vegetation and surface water.

In 2019, Del Valle and co-workers won a Centers for Disease Control competition to improve flu forecasting software. During the COVID-19 pandemic, Del Valle worked on a computational model to describe the spread of COVID-19 around the United States. As there is no historical data for SARS-CoV-2, the computational models developed by Del Valle were very different to those she had previously used understand the spread of influenza. Her models were used to inform states on social distancing guidelines and quarantine restrictions. Her models, which were released in late April 2020, made use of data from the Johns Hopkins University platform developed by Lauren Gardner. Del Valle has recommended that the public wear face masks. By locking down early, New Mexico, the state that is home to the LANL, avoided a steep SARS-CoV-2 death toll. Del Valle has called for a global centre to be established that can monitor information about the spread of COVID-19.

== Selected works and publications ==
=== Selected works ===
- Del Valle, S.Y.; Hyman, J.M.; Hethcote, H.W.; Eubank, S.G. (October 2007). "Mixing patterns between age groups in social networks". Social Networks. 29 (4): 539–554. doi:10.1016/j.socnet.2007.04.005. ISSN 0378-8733.
- Hickmann, Kyle S.; Fairchild, Geoffrey; Priedhorsky, Reid; Generous, Nicholas; Hyman, James M.; Deshpande, Alina; Del Valle, Sara Y. (14 May 2015). "Forecasting the 2013–2014 Influenza Season Using Wikipedia". PLOS Computational Biology. 11 (5) e1004239. arXiv:1410.7716. Bibcode:2015PLSCB..11E4239H. doi:10.1371/journal.pcbi.1004239. ISSN 1553-7358. PMC 4431683. PMID 25974758. Wikidata ()
- Generous, Nicholas; Fairchild, Geoffrey; Deshpande, Alina; Del Valle, Sara Y.; Priedhorsky, Reid (24 March 2016). "Global Disease Monitoring and Forecasting with Wikipedia". Online Journal of Public Health Informatics. 8 (1): e1003892. doi:10.5210/ojphi.v8i1.6530. ISSN 1947-2579. PMC 4231164. PMID 25392913. Wikidata ()

=== Selected publications ===
- Valle, Sara Del (27 March 2019). "How Big Data Can Help Save the World". Scientific American Blog Network.
- Bushwick, Sophie (23 July 2019). ""Anonymous" Data Won't Protect Your Identity". Scientific American.
