= Emil' Keme =

Guatemalan professor (born 1970)

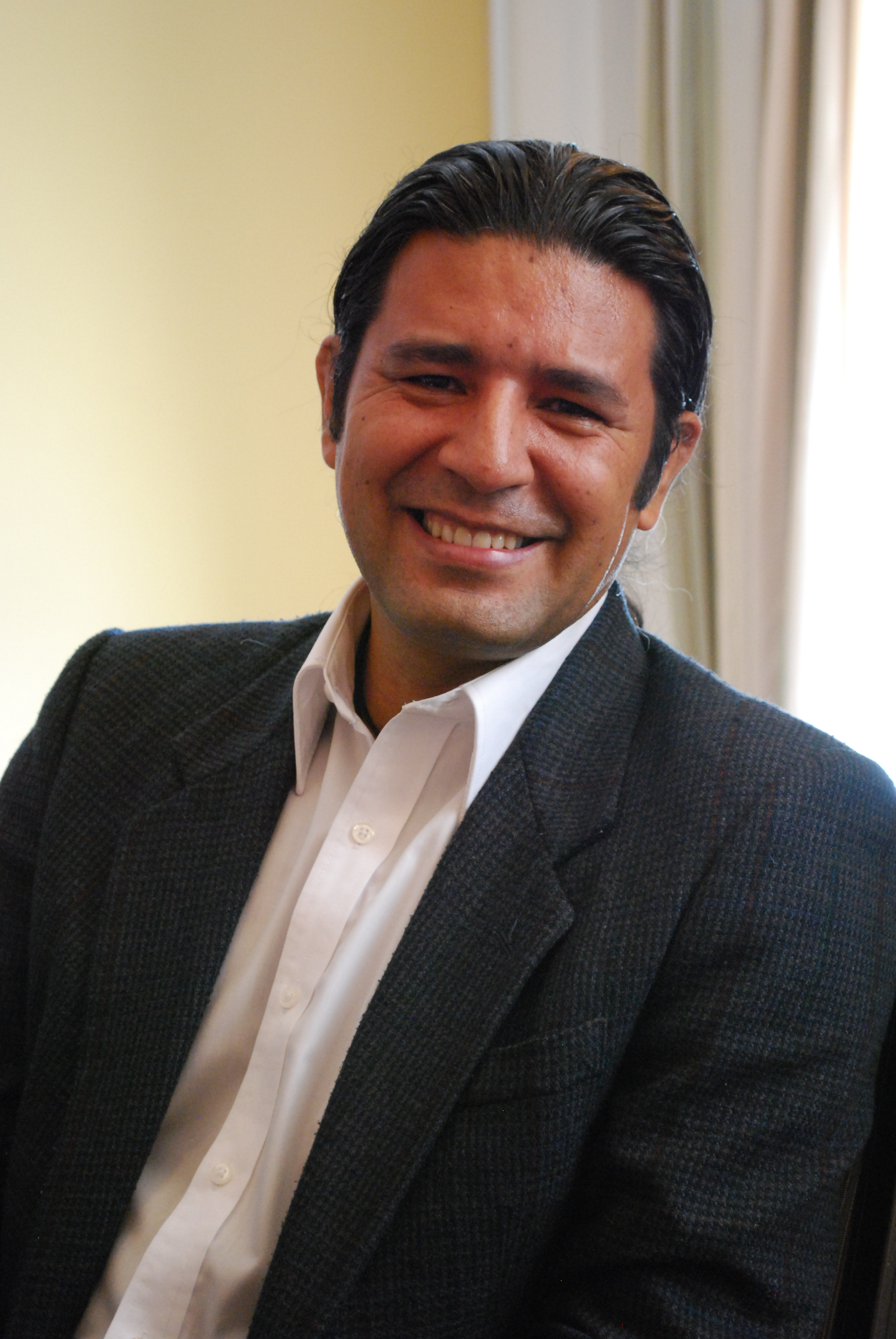
- Keme at the 58th conference of the Seminar on the Acquisition of Latin American Library Materials
- Born: 1970 (age 54–55)

Academic background
- Education: University of Pittsburgh (PhD)

Academic work
- Discipline: Indigenous studies

Emilio del Valle Escalante (born 1970), known as Emil' Keme, is a Guatemalan/K'iche Maya professor and researcher in Indigenous literatures and cultures at Emory University. He has written and edited books on his fields of expertise as well as various journal articles. He has also presented talks at other U.S. educational institutions.

== Career ==
Keme received his PhD from the University of Pittsburgh in 2004. His areas of expertise include contemporary Latin American and indigenous literatures and social movements, cultural and post-colonial studies and indigenous studies. Much of his work has been focused on textual production by Indigenous peoples in Abiayala (the Americas) and how these challenge the usual political and social narratives about Indigenous peoples in Latin America. This is part of a broader theme of colonialism, nationhood, national identity, race/ethnicity and gender. His book, Le Maya Q'atzij/Our Maya Word: Poetics of Resistance and Emancipation From Iximulew/Guatemala 1960-2012, which focuses on the poetry of ten contemporary Maya poets, was awarded the 2020 Casa de las Americas Literary Prize.

He has presented his work on the Mayan movements at Penn State Lehigh Valley, and the Guatemalan Civil War at Virginia Commonwealth University.

He has been a professor of English and Indigenous Studies at Emory University since the fall semester of 2023 and was formerly an associate professor at the University of North Carolina at Chapel Hill from 2007 through 2023. Graduate courses he has taught include Indigenous Literatures of the Americas, Contemporary Central American Narrative and Spanish-American Literature:1880–Present. Undergraduate courses include Mesoamerica Through Its Literature, Introduction to Indigenous Literatures, Contemporary Latin American Narrative: Magic realism, boom and post-boom, Contemporary Latin America: México, Central America and the Andes and Introduction to Latin American Literature.

== Publications ==
=== Books ===
- Le Maya Q'atzij/Our Maya Word: Poetics of Resistance in Guatemala. Minneapolis: University of Minnesota Press. 2021.
  - Published in Spanish as Le qatzij Mayab' / Nuestra palabra Maya: Poéticas de resistencia en Iximulew/Guatemala. Guatemala: Tujaal Ediciones. 2020.
- Maya Nationalisms and Postcolonial Challenges in Guatemala: Coloniality, Modernity and Identity Politics. Santa Fe: School for Advanced Research Press. 2009.
  - Published in Spanish as Nacionalismos mayas y desafíos postcoloniales en Guatemala: Colonialidad, Modernidad y Politicas de la identidad cultural. Guatemala: FLACSO. 2008.

=== Edited volumes ===
- U'k'ux kaj, u'k'ux ulew: Antologia de poesia maya guatemalteca contemporanea. Pittsburgh, PA: Instituto Internacional de Literatura Iberoamericana, 2010.
- Guest editor, Introductory Article, “Indigenous literatures and Social Movements in Latin America”, Special issue of the Latin American Indian Literatures Journal 1:24 (Fall 2008).

=== Selected articles ===
- "Gregorio Condori Mamani and the Reconceptualization of Andean Memory in Cuzco, Peru." Studies in American Indian Literatures 21:4 (Winter 2009), 1-19.
- “Globalización, Pueblos indígenas e identidad cultural en Guatemala.”InLógicas culturales y políticas: Un laborioso tejido en la Guatemala plural. Special issue of Revista de Estudios Interetnicos 21:15 (January, 2008), 35-60. (uncpub)
- "Maya Nationalism and Political Decolonization in Guatemala". Latin American and Caribbean Ethnic Studies 1:2 (2006), 203-213. (uncpub)
- “Vanguardia Hispanoamericana, modernidad y pueblos indígenas enPequeña sinfonía del Nuevo Mundo de Luís Cardoza y Aragón.”Mesoamérica 48 (Enero-Diciembre 2006), 129-148.
- “Latinoamericanismo, Barroco de Indias y Colonialidad del poder: Reflexiones sobre políticas de exclusión.” Procesos: Revista Ecuatoriana de Historia 23 (I Semestre, 2006), 115-133.
- “Discursos mayas y desafíos postcoloniales en Guatemala: Luis de Lión y El tiempo principia en Xibalbá.” Revista Iberoamericana 72:215-216 (Abril-Septiembre 2006), 545-558.
- “Untying Tongues: Minority and Minoritizes Literatures in Spain and Latin America” (With Alfredo Sosa Velasco, Special issue of Romance Notes, 2011)
- Valle-Escalante, Emilio del (31 May 2013). "Teorizando las literaturas indigenas contemporaneas". A Contracorriente. 10 (3): 1–20.

Other articles have been published in venues such as Mesoamerica, Studies in American Indian Literature, Revista Iberoamericana, Latin American Caribbean and Ethnic Studies, Procesos: Revista Ecuatoriana de Historia and Revista de Estudios Interétnicos.
