= Agripina Montes del Valle =

Colombian writer (1844–1912)

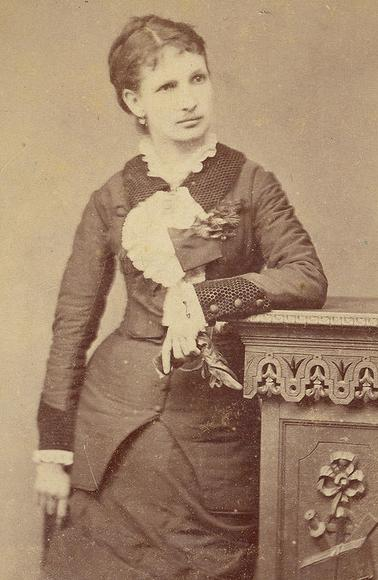
- Photo portrait of Agripina Montes del Valle
- Born: c. 1844; Salamina, Caldas, Republic of New Granada
- Died: May 5, 1912 (aged 67–68); Anolaima, Cundinamarca
- Education: Colegio la Merced

Agripina Montes del Valle (c. 1844–1912) also known as "Azucena del Valle", "Porcia" and "La Musa del Tequendama", was a Colombian poet, writer, and intellectual.

She was recognized for her works dedicated to the beauty of her country and region, and to the women of Colombia and Latin America at the end of the 19th century and the beginning of the 20th century.

== Biography ==
Agripina Montes del Valle was born in 1844. She was the daughter of Francisco Montes and Dolores Salazar Atehortua. Agripina pursued a career as a Colombian university professor and writer.

She came from a middle-class family with access to written culture. Among her relatives were renowned journalists and politicians for the time. In 1854, at the young age of ten, she studied at Colegio la Merced in the city of Santa Fe de Bogotá.

In 1864, she was already publishing poems in the literary magazine directed by "el patriarca". There, she met different women poets such as Agripina Samper de Ancízar and Silveria Espinosa de Rendon; who were daughters, wives or sisters of intellectuals from the city of Santa Fe. It is for this reason that Montes del Valle is considered one of the few women who managed to develop her career as a writer without any male support.

She married the poet and journalist Miguel María del Valle in 1865 and became the mother of three children, which was an obstacle to her career as a writer, as she stated in her article published three years later, which bears the name of "Literature Projects" where a 24-year-old woman, married with 3 children, reveals the impotence she feels when she cannot write as she would like to do due to her housework, especially taking care of her children, which takes away too much time.

Years later, she continued to publish poems in literary magazines such as La mujer, El Mosaico, El Iris and El Nuevo Tiempo Literario. Much of her life was dedicated to teaching. Which eventually lead in 1870 lead to her founding the Colegio de la Concepción in the city of Manizales, where she was an educator. Following this, seven years later she was appointed director of the Magdalena Normal School.

In the year 1886, Montes del Valle was widowed. Therefore, for family reasons, she withdrew from her for a time from her literary interests. However, a year later in 1887, while she was an educator at the Magdalena Normal School, she published her most recognized poem "Al Tequendama", thanks to this she was part of the publication of the important anthology El Parnaso Colombiano compiled by Julio Áñez.

=== Fragment of AL TEQUENDAMA ===
Tequendama grandioso,
deslumbrada ante el séquito asombroso
de tu prismal, riquísimo atavío,
la atropellada fuga persiguiendo
de tu flotante mole en el vacío
el alma presa de febril mareo
en tus orillas trémulas paseo...

—
