= Estrella del Valle =

Mexican poet (born 1971)

Estrella del Valle is a Mexican poet. She was born in Córdoba, Veracruz on 7 September 1971. She studied pedagogy. She studied creative writing at the Writer's General Society of Mexico (Sociedad General de Escritores de México, SOGEM).

In 2000, she won the Ephraim Huerta National Prize of Poetry for Fábula para los cuervos. Her poems have appeared in the anthology Generación del 2000, Literatura Mexicana hacia el Tercer Milenio. She currently lives in Los Angeles, California, United States.

== Bibliography ==
- Bajo la luna de Aholiba
- Fábula para los cuervos (Premio Nacional de Poesía Efraín Huerta, Guanajuato 2000)
- La cortesana de Dannan (Premio Nacional de Poesía Ramón López Velarde 2000)
- El desierto;dolores (Premio Latinoamericano de Poesía "Benemérito de América, Oaxaca 2003)
- Vuelo México-Los Ángeles.Puerta23 (Mención Honorífica en el VI Premio Latinoamericano Ciudad de Medellín)

Awards and Distinctions:

- 2007 Mención Honorífica en el VI Premio Latinoamericano de Poesìa Ciudad de Medellin
- 2003 Premio Latinoamericano de Poesìa "Benemérito de Àmérica" de la Universidad Autónoma de Oaxaca
- 2000 Premio Nacional de Literatura Efraín Huerta del Estado de Guanajuato
- 2000 Premio Nacional de Poesía Ramón López Velarde de la Universidad de Zacatecas
- 1999 Mención Honorífica en el Premio Nacional de Poesía Joven Elías Nandino
- 1998 Premio de Poesía Memoración a García Lorca organizado por el Festival Internacional Cervantino y la Sogem

International Magazines:

- The Bitter Oleander, NY
- Bordersenses, TX
- The burnside review
- Hunger Magazine, NY
- New York International Poetry
- Pemmican (on-line)
- Poesia
- The Wandering Hermit review, NY, entre otras.

She collaborated on the introduction and translation of the poet Silvia Tomasa Rivera on the Sulphur River Literary Review journal in Texas. In April 2007, The Bitter Oleander magazine dedicated, on its Volume 2, number XIII, a series of poems and an interview conducted by American poet, Paul Roth.

Poems of hers have appeared on magazines and supplements of national and international distribution. Her poems take part on the 2000s generation's anthology (Antología Generación del 2000), Literature towards the third millennium, Tierra Adentro list of titles; The water takes shape in the clearing glass' rigor (En el rigor del vaso que la aclara el agua toma forma), Young poets' tribute to Gorostiza, Claudia Posadas' compilation, Resistencia publishing.

Her work has been compiled in several anthologies including: Best Mexican Tales (Los Mejores Cuentos Mexicanos), Joaquín Mortíz, 2003; Mexican Poetry Yearbook (Anuario de Poesía Mexicana), selection by Tedi López Mill and Luis Felipe Fabre, FCE editions, 2004; Best Mexican Poems (Los Mejores Poemas Mexicanos) 2005 edition, selection by Francisco Hernández, Joaquín Mortiz editions and finally Best Mexican Poems (Los Mejores Poemas Mexicanos) 2006 editions, selection by Elsa Cross, Joaquín Mortiz editions.

Scholarships:

- 2007 Beca Creadores con Trayectoria del Fondo Estatal para la Cultura y las Artes de Veracruz.
- 2003 Beca del Fondo nacional para la Cultura y las Artes en el rubro de literatura-cuento
- 2001 Beca Creadores con Trayectoria del Fondo Estatal para la Cultura y las Artes de Veracruz
- 1997 Beca del Instituto Veracruzano de la Cultura en el rubro de poesía.

Lectures:

- Beyond Baroque Literary Arts Center Febrero 2007
- Syracuse University (Cruel April Festival, Point Contac Gallery) New York, abril 2006
- University of the Pacific California, Abril del 2006 y Noviembre del 2006.
- Berond Baroque Literary Arts Center (Dialogue Across Borders Reading Series, 2005) Venice, California, 2005
- Casa de los Tres Mundos, Granada, Nicaragua, Febrero del 2005

She is an editor of the Caguama magazine in Los Angeles, California. Her poetry has been translated into English by the translator Toshiya Kamei and the poet Anthony Seidman.
