= Fe del Valle =

Cuban activist (1917–1961)

Fe del Valle Ramos (Remedios, Cuba, 9 August 1917 – 13 April 1961) was a Cuban civil rights activist, who died in the El Encanto fire, a terrorist attack in Havana.

== Personal background ==
Fe del Valle was a trained milliner, originally from San Juan de los Remedios, Villa Clara Province. She was commonly known as "Lula". In 1938 she married Orlando Ravelo, and had two children; in 1961, son Robin was age 14, and Erick was 17, training to be a military pilot.

== El Encanto department store ==
El Encanto was the largest department store in Cuba, with five retail storeys. It was originally built in 1888, and was situated on the corner of Galiano and San Rafael in Old Havana. Before the Cuban Revolution, it had been privately owned, but in 1959 it was nationalized. In 1961, it employed about 930 people. After the store was nationalized, Fe del Valle became an organizer of many of the department store's activities. She became head of the children's department, and was also one of the founders of the National Revolutionary Militias, and head of the store's delegation to the Federation of Cuban Women. In April 1961, she was helping to plan the construction of a day care center on the roof of the building. That was to serve the children of the store's employees, most of whom were women.

== El Encanto fire ==
After the store closed on 13 April 1961, a fellow employee, Carlos González Vidal, planted two incendiary devices in the tailoring department. After the fire was discovered, Fe del Valle tried to extinguish the flames. When that failed, she evidently attempted to recover money donated towards the day care center; she then became trapped, and was overcome by dense smoke. Her death provoked popular outrage, particularly because she was a woman dedicated to the revolution. Carlos González Vidal was later tried, sentenced to death, and executed by firing squad.

== Legacy ==
The former site of the department store is now the location of the Fe del Valle park.

== See also ==
- Bay of Pigs Invasion
