= Agustín Salas del Valle =

Mexican murderer, rapist, and suspected serial killer (1964-)

- Born: 1964 (age 61–62); Mexico City, Mexico
- Other names: "Jack the Strangler" "The Women Strangler" "The Mata-Meretrices"
- Conviction: Murder
- Penalty: 50 years imprisonment

Details
- Victims: 1–20+
- Span of crimes: 1989–1993
- Country: Mexico
- Date apprehended: August 7, 1993

Agustín Salas del Valle (born 1964) is a Mexican murderer. It is believed that he murdered more than 20 women in the Central Zone between 1989 and 1993; although he was only condemned for one of the homicides. He was known as "Jack the Strangler", "The Women Strangler" and "The Mata-Meretrices".

== Modus operandi ==
He intercepted his victims in the streets (all women between 20 and 40 years old, mostly sex workers), driving them to hotels in Mexico City's Central Zone. He would rent a room, threaten the women and strike them, later violating them; finally, he murdered them, mainly by strangulation with improvised objects in the room (the killer's clothing, the victim's own clothing, drapery cords, cables for household appliances, etc.), although he sometimes stabbed them. He left the half-naked bodies abandoned in the room, usually wrapped up in covers and hidden under the bed. Sometimes he would leave messages written on mirrors and walls.

== Unresolved cases ==
At the end of 1989, the corpse of a strangled woman appeared in the Hotel "Magnolia" on Magnolia Street, Guerrero Colonia, Mexico City. This crime was considered an isolated incident, but at the beginning of 1990, a second woman died in very similar conditions, followed by another two in September of the same year. It was evident that there was a link between the crimes. As the perpetrator's methods evolved and the episodic nature of the murders became clear, suspicions of a serial killer came up.

The crimes continued until 1993, when del Valle was arrested for the murder of a sex worker, and he became the main suspect in all the cases. However, his guilt could not be proven. In total 27 of the 30 cases attributed to "Jack the Strangler" were unresolved and became cold cases. In addition, several details made the authorities firmly believe that it was the work of either copycats of multiple serial killers.

- 1989: the first victim in Guerrero.
- 1990: nine victims in hotels in La Merced, Iztapalapa and Anahuac. Here was highlighted the homicide of a sex worker, found on December 1 in Iztapalapa. Until this point the crimes began with women being beaten, raped and strangled; then they were stabbed and cut up; and finally, in this case, the victim was mutilated, with her hands and feet cut off. After these nine crimes (from 1989 and the eight of 1990) which surpassed in sadism after each murder, the last murder in 1990 was on December 23, which broke the killer's pattern. Like the very first victim, this woman was raped and strangled, and her body was wrapped in quilts and hidden under a bed. The police considered this the work of a copycat.
- 1991: five victims in Obrera, Moctezuma and Anahuac.. The killer's line of evolution was in a zigzag (between very violent crimes and others not so much), this made evident the existence of more than one murderer, unrelated to each other. On January 5, (with the first victim of the year), the murderer made a change in the execution of his crimes, writing with lipstick in one of mirrors in the room the initials "LMB". The killer had never been interested in giving a message, as he was hedonistic. The desire to be the antagonist and to be identified as a "serial killer" (especially in ones that are mediated), are characteristic features, more non-exclusive, of copycats or assassins. Of course, this was never proven.
- 1992: nine victims. On September 2, with the sixth victim of the year, the perpetrator returned to leave a message, again written with lipstick in a room with the mirror reading: "I will return."
- 1993: three victims (not including the homicide to which del Valle confessed, which was resolved).

=== Suspects ===
Before the arrest of Agustín Salas, the police arrested several men that were suspected of being the strangler, the first being Jaime Meza Roque. On December 14, 1990, after the murder of the ninth victim, Roque was arrested after hitting a prostitute, but his involvement in the crimes could not be proven. In addition, during Roque's imprisonment, the Strangler continued to attack. He was only prosecuted for the physical aggression inflicted on Rocío Pérez Hernández.

On September 9, 1992, sex worker Raquel Cisneros was murdered in the style of the "Mata-prostitutes" after being raped and strangled with the strap of her purse. At first the crime was attributed to the serial killer, but the murderer had let many people see him enter the hotel with the victim and leave alone, leaving fingerprints and DNA samples all over the room and the body. On September 25, sixteen days after the crime, José Luis Ornelas Angulo was arrested and later convicted of Cisneros' murder.

On October 10, 1992, the body of Martha Martínez García, a 25-year-old sex worker, was found. As in Ornelas' case, the perpetrator made rookie mistakes. The crime scene was a copy of the Strangler's first murder. It even took place in the original murder location, the "Magnolia" hotel.

On the same day, another woman was killed, but with the refined and violent characteristics attributed to the Strangler. Thirteen days later, on October 23, José Enrique Martínez Morales declared himself the Strangler, but no matter how much tried to prove it, he could not describe the crime scene correctly due to his knowledge being from the media. He was a simple imitator anxious for recognition and he was detained for the aforementioned homicide.

On April 14, 1993, Filadelfo Miranda Rivera was arrested for trying to strangle a prostitute, but had verified alibis for most of the crimes of the Strangler, and it could not be proven that he was connected to any of them. He was only convicted for attempted murder.

== Arrest of Agustín Salas ==
On April 6, 1993, the body of a sex worker was found in a hotel. The details of the crime were shocking: the woman was brutally beaten and stabbed, raped and killed by strangulation with a tie (which was later proven to belong to the murderer); the heart was removed with surgical precision, and the body was left on the bed with arms and legs extended, covered in blankets; the perpetrator had drawn a pentagram and a circle, along with the acronym "CO" and several scribbles.

Witnessed gave a description of a man who entered with the victim. On August 7, 1993, after the Strangler had killed two other victims, Agustín Salas del Valle, a 29-year-old accounting student, was arrested.

Testimony that affirmed his entrance with the woman and his later exit alone, in addition to forensics exams, sealed Salas' accept his fate. He never confessed, nor could it be proven that he had connections to the other murders, but the crime on April 6 (with several aggravating circumstances) was enough to condemn Salas to 50 years in prison. After his arrest, the crimes stopped.

== See also ==
- List of serial killers by country
