= Cristina del Valle =

Spanish singer (born 1962)

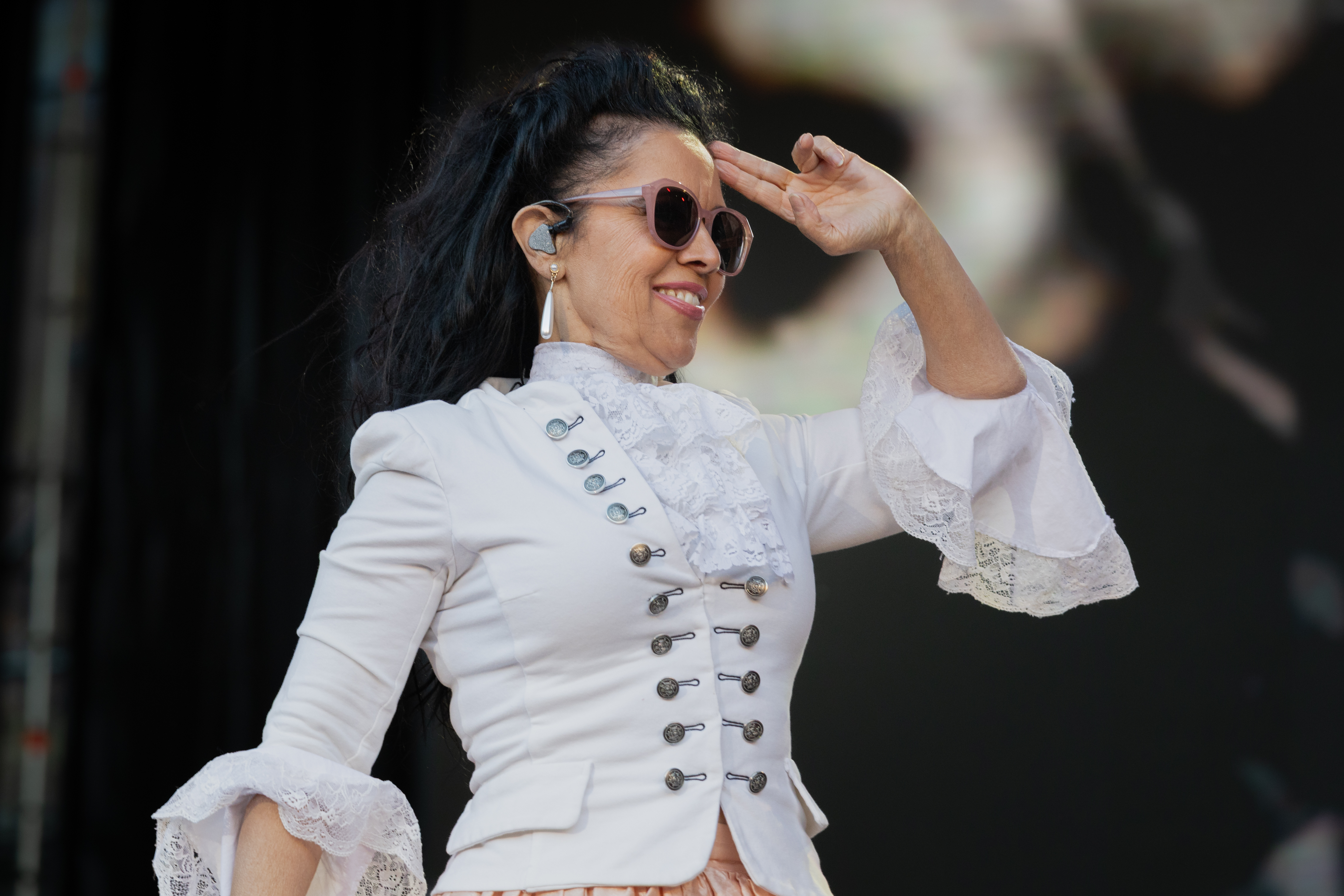
- Cristina del Valle in 2026.

Background information
- Born: Cristina del Valle; 1 August 1960 (age 65); Oviedo, Asturias, Spain
- Genres: Pop, rock
- Occupation: Singer
- Years active: 1986–present
- Label: WEA
- Member of: Amistades Peligrosas
- Formerly of: Vodevil

Cristina del Valle (born 1 August 1960) is a Spanish singer and activist.

== Biography ==
Cristina del Valle was born in Oviedo, Asturias, Spain.

In 1980, she went to Madrid to study criminology and since 1978, she has worked in several social action groups, NGOs (Ayora, Solidarios, Apram, and others) and left-wing political parties which worked in support of human rights, for the Sahrawi people or against domestic violence.

As a singer, she started with the band Vodebil, but she released her first solo-album in 1989, Cris. In 1991, after meeting her sentimental partner Alberto Comesaña, the couple decided to launch the musical duo Amistades Peligrosas, which grew to great success. The group split in 1996, but returned in 2003 with the album La larga espera. She has also collaborated in several musical projects such as Tatuaje, a hommage to the world of copla where she performed María de la O (song). Hevia was as well her sentimental partner.

== Prizes ==
- Mujer del año 1998, Valdés (Asturias)
- Premio Comadre de oro de [Antroxu] 1999
- Premio Vaqueira, 1999
- Premio Flor de Manzana, Villaviciosa (Asturias)
- Premio Racimo de oro 1999, Jerez
- Premio Unión General de Trabajadores (UGT) "Mujer 99”
- Premio Luarca 1999
- Premio T de Tarde a la Tolerancia 2000
- Premio radio Gorbea 2001
- Premio Nosotras 2001

== Discography ==
=== Solo career ===
- Cris, 1989
- Siempre te metes en líos,1990
- El Dios de las Pequeñas cosas, 1999
- Apuntes generales del mundo, 2001
- Tiempos Rotos 2009

=== With Alberto Comesaña in Amistades Peligrosas ===
- Relatos de una intriga, 1991
- La última Tentación, 1993
- La Profecía, 1995
- Nueva Era, 1997
- La larga espera, 2003
- Recopilatorio Amistades Peligrosas
- El arte de amar (2013)
