= Luisa del Valle Silva =

Venezuelan poet

- Born: January 8, 1896; Barcelona
- Died: July 24, 1962 (aged 66); Caracas
- Occupation: Poet, educator

Luisa del Valle Silva (8 January 1896 – 26 July 1962) was a Venezuelan poet of the Generación del 18.

== Biography ==
Luisa del Valle Silva was born on 8 January 1896 in Barcelona, Venezuela, the daughter of Pedro Vicente Silva Morandi and María Luisa Figallo Giordani.

She grew up in Carúpano and worked as a teacher there and in Caracas after moving there in 1926. She began publishing poetry at age 15 and developed a classical, lyrical style of personal expression.

She was one of the founders of the Asociación Venezolana de Mujeres, the Federación Venezolana de Maestros, and the Caracas Athenaeum.

Luisa del Valle Silva died on 26 July 1962 in Caracas.

== Personal life ==
Her nephew was the poet Alfredo Silva Estrada.

== Bibliography ==
- Ventanas de ensueño. (Dream Windows) Editorial Élite. 1930.
- Humo: poemas, 1926-1929; (Smoke) Imp. La Verónica. La Habana. Cuba, 1941.
- Amor: poemas, 1929-1940. (I Love) Imp. La Verónica. La Habana. Cuba, 1941.
- Luz: poemas, 1930-1940. Imp. La Verónica. La Habana. Cuba, 1941.
- En Silencio. (In Silence) En: Lírica Hispánica. Caracas, 1961.
- Poesía. Serie: Cuadernos Literarios de la Asociación de Escritores Venezolanos. Editorial Arte. Caracas, 1962.
- Sin tiempo y sin espacio. (Without Time of Space) Arte. Caracas, 1963.
- Amanecer. (To Dawn) Publicaciones del Instituto Nacional de Cultura y Bellas Artes, Inciba. Colección Puente Dorado. Caracas, 1968.
- Antología poética. Publicación en Cuadernos Literarios de la Asociación de Escritores Venezolanos. Caracas, 1980.
