= Hispanic Democratic Organization =

The Hispanic Democratic Organization (HDO) was a political action committee (PAC) active from 1993 to 2008.

== History ==
HDO was created by Tim Degnan, Victor Reyes, and Al Sanchez in 1993 to assist Richard M. Daley win his first mayoral election. At first, the organization focused on the South Side of Chicago. Aside from Mayor Daley, HDO was a major force in electing alderman, state representatives, and state senators. According to the Chicago Sun-Times, HDO spent $530,338 on political campaigns.

The HDO filed paperwork on July 1, 2008, along with state records, that indicate the group is closing its campaign committee. The group's reports show that all their funds were spent as of April 2008.

== Controversy ==
In 2006, a Federal investigation was launched into hiring practices at Chicago City Hall. HDO and other political groups allegedly had influence over the city's hiring system and political workers allegedly were rewarded with city jobs and promotions. This investigation culminated into convictions of Angelo Torres on Hired Trucks, George Prado's conviction on drug dealing, John Resa. Al Sanchez and Aaron DelValle were charged with perjury and fraud in relation to employment practices. The two were later granted a new trial after it was discovered that FBI agents had known the cooperating witness Brian Gabriel was in fact working as informant in a case pending in Indiana and may have used his testimony at the Sanchez-DelValle trial as part of a plea deal in the case pending in Indiana. Judge Gettlemen found that Gabriel's testimony was essential to the case, and ordered a new trial for late June 2010.
