= Amistades Peligrosas (band) =

Spanish band

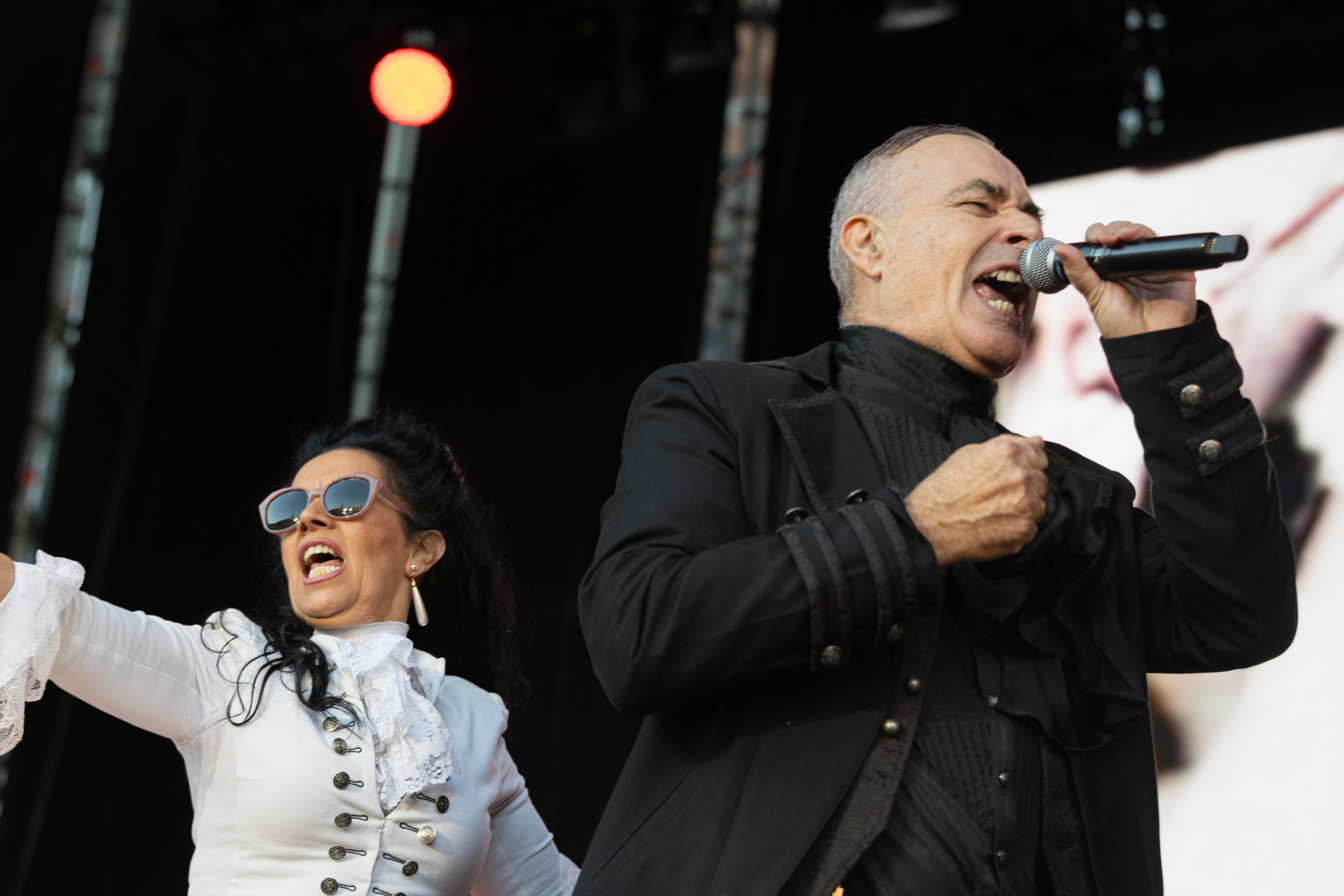
Amistades Peligrosas performing at Plaza Mayor, Madrid, May 2026.

Amistades Peligrosas ("Dangerous Friendships") is a Spanish duo formed in 1989 by singers Alberto Comesaña from Galicia and Cristina del Valle from Asturias. Their music blended musical styles such as Celtic and classical music. The flute, bouzouki and bagpipes are common instruments used by the band.

== Discography ==
- Relatos de una intriga (1991), EMI
- La última tentación (1993), EMI
- La profecía (1996), EMI
- Nueva era (1997), EMI
- Grandes éxitos (greatest hits album) (1998), EMI
- La larga espera (2003), Valemusic (50,000+ copies, gold in Spain)
- El arte de amar (2013), Avispa Music
- Pacto de sal (2019)
- El regreso (2020)
