= Rafael del Valle (poet) =

Puerto Rican-Spanish poet and medical doctor

Rafael del Valle Rodríguez (1847 - 1917) was a Puerto Rican-Spanish poet and physician.

Born in Aguadilla, Puerto Rico, he studied medicine in the University of Barcelona. He was a student at Louis Pasteur's class in Pasteur's institute. He exerted his profession of medicine in Aguada, Aguadilla, Arecibo, and San Juan, at the same that he cultivated Literature.

Rafael del Valle was the father of Rodulfo del Valle (1871 - 1948), mayor of Ponce from 1918 to 1920.

Due to his political ideas, he was exiled to Venezuela in 1881, returning in 1898 with the change in sovereignty in Puerto Rico. He was a leader of the party of Luis Muñoz Rivera and member of the Executive Council of Puerto Rico.

His lyric work was compiled posthumously in the book "Poesías Completas" (Complete Poetries) in 1921. He was essentially a romantic poet with incursions in religious, political, progressive, and educative fields.

== Legacy ==
A middle school is named after him in Aguadilla.

== See also ==
- List of Puerto Ricans
