= Chicago City Hall =

Seat of government of Chicago and Cook County, Illinois

City Hall–County Building
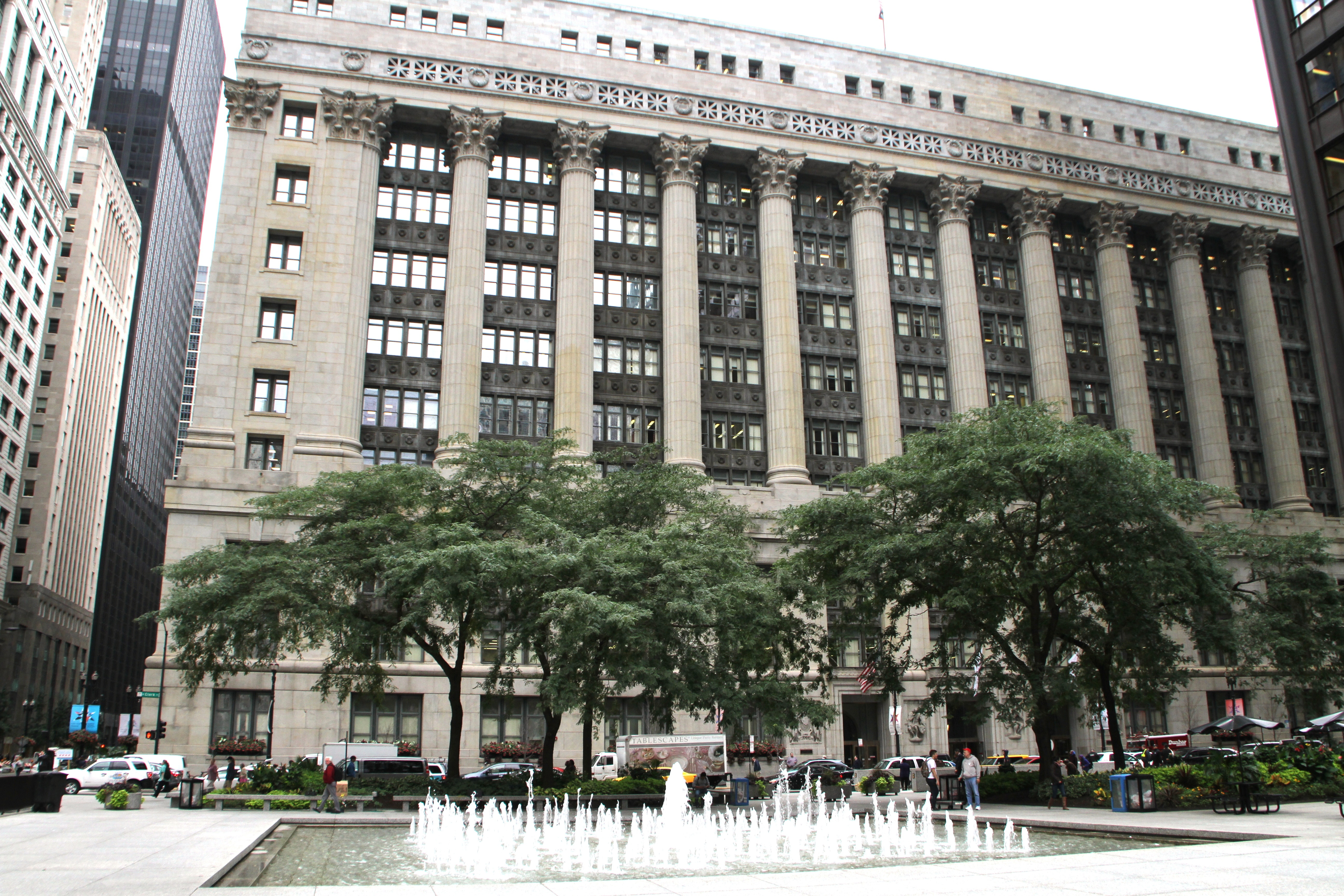
- View from Daley Plaza (2014)

General information
- Architectural style: Neoclassical architecture
- Location: Chicago
- Coordinates: 41.88386°N 87.631631°W
- Completed: 1911; 115 years ago

Height
- Height: 218 ft (66 m)

Technical details
- Floor count: 12
- Floor area: 760,000 sq ft

Design and construction
- Architect: Holabird & Roche
- Chicago City Hall
- U.S. Historic district – Contributing property
- Part of: West Loop–LaSalle Street Historic District (ID12001238)
- Designated CP: June 1, 2013

The City Hall–County Building, most commonly known as the Chicago City Hall, is a 12-story building in Chicago, Illinois, that houses the seats of government of the City of Chicago and Cook County. The building's west side (City Hall, 121 N. LaSalle St.) holds the offices of the mayor, city clerk, and city treasurer; some city departments; offices of alderpersons of Chicago's 50 wards; and the Chicago City Council's chambers. The building's east side (County Building, 118 N. Clark St.) houses offices of the Government of Cook County, including the Cook County Board of Commissioners' chambers.

The building spans a city block bounded by Randolph Street to the north, Washington Street to the south, Clark Street to the east, and LaSalle Street to the west. It is the seventh building to serve as Chicago's city hall, the fourth built at its location, and the third shared by the governments of Chicago and Cook County. Its location has served as the seat of the city and county governments since 1853, except for a period from 1871—when the Great Chicago Fire destroyed the building—to 1885.

The building was designed by the architectural firm Holabird & Roche in the classical revival style. Its two sections were finished three years apart: the county building (east) was completed in 1908; the city hall (west) was completed in 1911. It was officially dedicated on February 27, 1911.

The "fifth floor" is sometimes used as a metonym for the office and power of the mayor, whose office is located on the fifth floor of the building.

== History ==
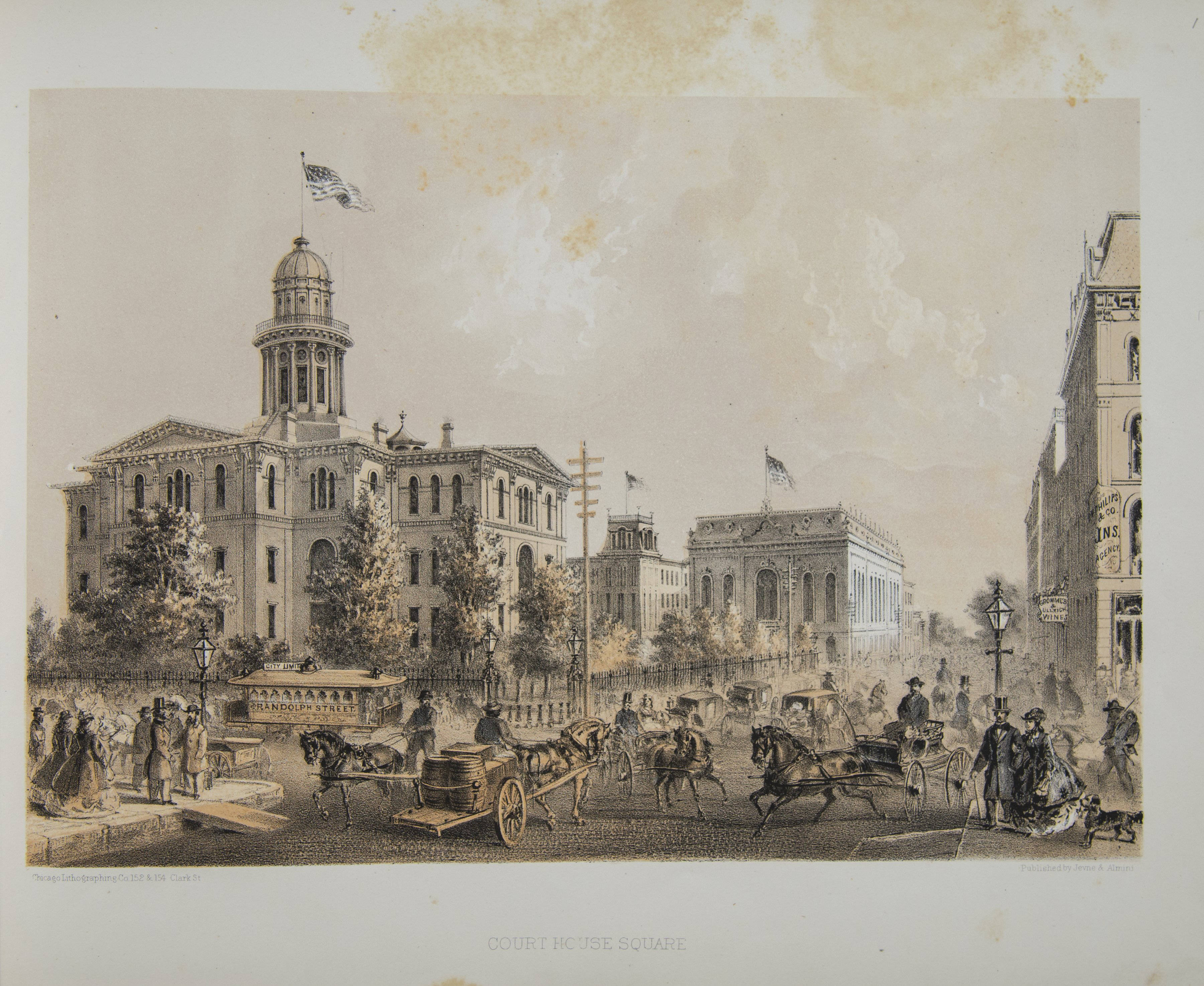
City Hall in Court House square ('Old Chicago Courthouse') in 1866, destroyed in the Great Chicago Fire of 1871

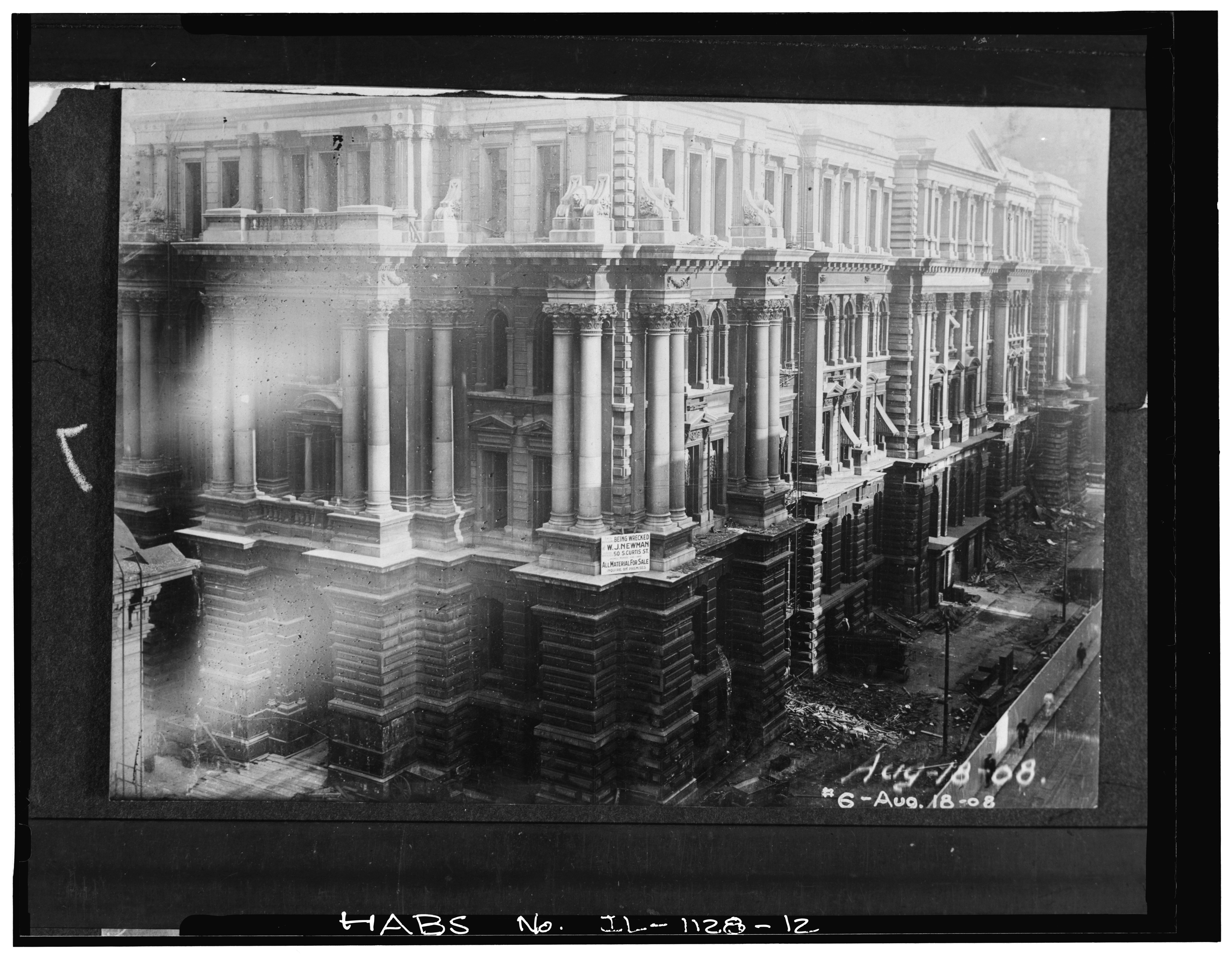
The 6th city hall building (1886–1905) in the French Empire style was quickly outgrown

=== Past buildings (1837–1908) ===
The first Chicago City Hall in 1837 was in leased chambers in the Saloon Building on the corner of Lake and Clark Streets. The city next leased space in a building owned by Nancy Chapman, from 1842 until 1848, when Old Market Hall was constructed in LaSalle Street. The city owned market hall held city council business on its second floor, with shops below until 1853. A new combined city hall and county courthouse was then constructed in the public square made by Randolph, LaSalle, Washington, and Clark Streets (this building, which later burned, is sometimes referred to as Old Chicago Courthouse). President Abraham Lincoln's body lay in state at the old courthouse city hall prior to his burial in Springfield in 1865. The courthouse bell was rung in 1871 to raise the alarm during the Great Chicago Fire before the hall burned to the ground.

A hastily constructed hall nicknamed the 'old rookery' was built around a water tank that survived the fire at LaSalle and Adams streets—today, that site houses the Rookery Building (built 1888). In 1885, the city and county completed construction of a new combined building in the French Empire style at the present site (and the site of the old courthouse). This building was demolished and replaced in 1905 by the present and larger classical revival structure.

=== Holabird & Roche Building (1908–present) ===
The city and county jointly sponsored an architectural competition that Holabird & Roche won by unanimous vote. Construction of the county building (east wing) began in 1905, and by 1907 some county offices were already beginning to move in. Construction of city hall (the west wing) was delayed until 1909 because the city had to wait for the State to increase its borrowing authority. Despite the delay, the two wings were easily linked together because the builders of the first wing arranged all necessary steel structural connections on its westernmost wall (where the wings meet) in anticipation of the second wing. Four construction workers died during the demolition of the old building and construction of the new one.

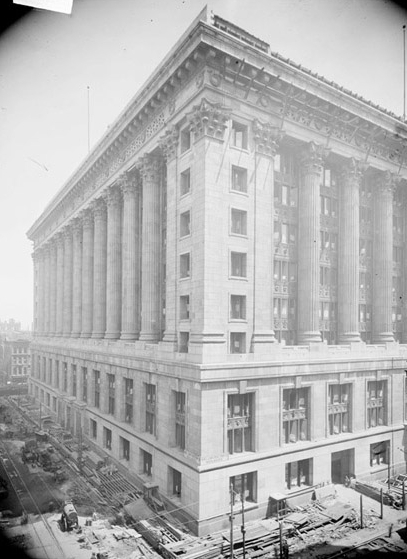
Holabird & Roche-designed building shortly before construction was completed in 1911

The building is distinguished by its colossal, 118 feet-tall, 9 feet-wide Woodbury granite Corinthian orders – among the largest ever built. The columns are hollow and were built in 5 feet-high segments. Altogether, the outer walls and orders are clad in 180,000 cubic feet of granite weighing 30 million pounds.

The ground floor lobby is clad in solid polished Botticino marble.

The exterior cornice was removed in 1948 and on March 21, 1957, a fire destroyed the original, Italian Renaissance-style City Council Chamber, which featured murals by Frederick Clay Bartlett and oak paneling imported from England. A completely remodeled, contemporary-style chamber reopened in 1958.

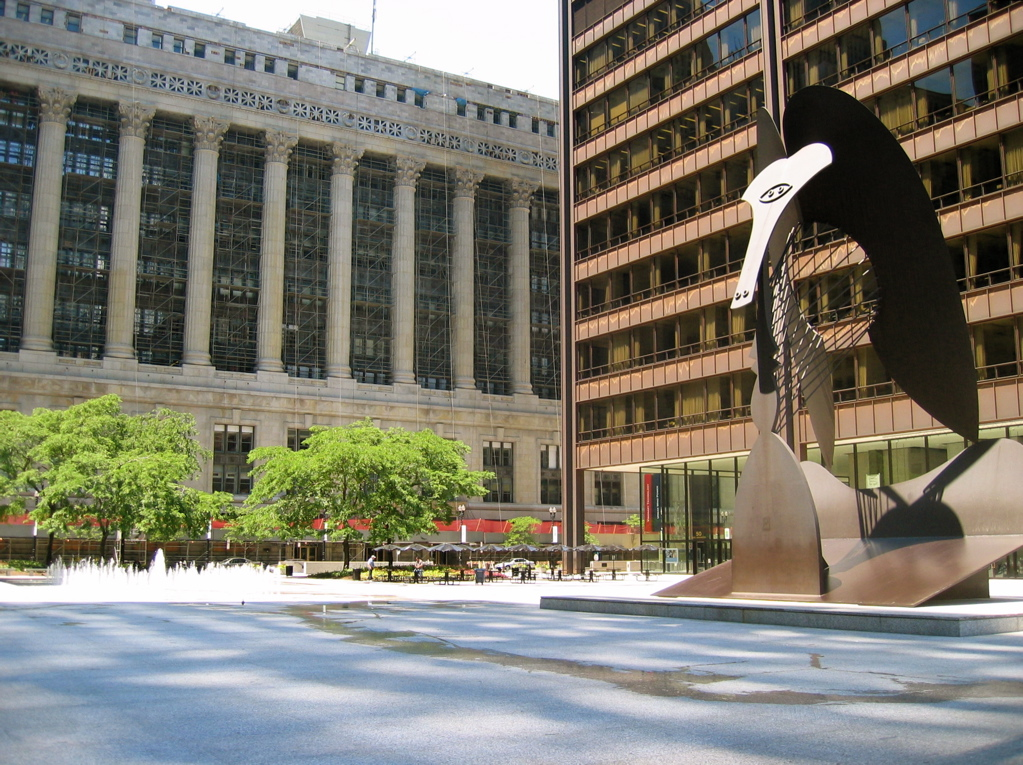
The City Hall-County Building and the Chicago Picasso as seen from Daley Plaza (2006)

During a major renovation project initiated in 1967, seventy-five percent of the interior of the building from basement to roof was renovated, including new suspended ceilings, partitions, flooring, lighting, wall finishes, bathrooms and boilers. The renovation was overseen by the Office of the City Architect with Holabird & Root serving as consulting architect.

The adjacent Richard J. Daley Center was constructed as an annex in the 1960s as the city and county governments outgrew the city hall-county building.

Holabird & Roche (later known as Holabird & Root) also designed the Northwestern Mutual Life Insurance Co. building at 720 E Wisconsin Avenue in Milwaukee. The Northwestern Mutual Life Building, which opened in 1914, bears striking similarity to Chicago City Hall, particularly its five-story colonnade and three grand entryways.

== Features ==
=== Entrance reliefs ===
The main (west) City Hall entrance features four reliefs sculpted by John Flanagan. Each of the panels represents one of four principal concerns of city government: playgrounds, schools, parks, and water supply.

The main (east) County Building entrance features four additional high reliefs: a man studying a scroll; a man holding a sailing ship and fishing net; and two near-identical reliefs depicting an older version of the county seal flanked by two young men.

City Hall Reliefs

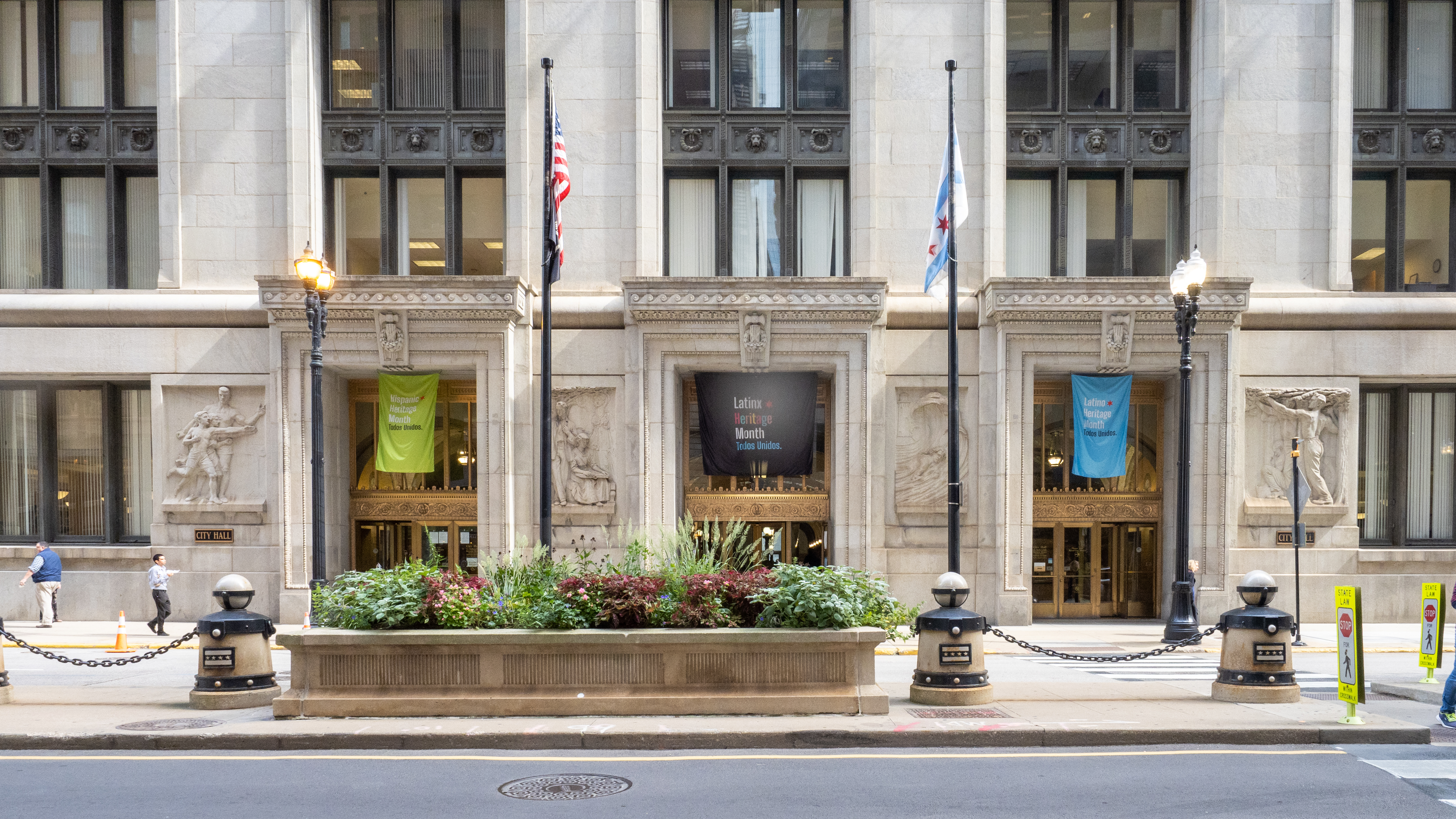

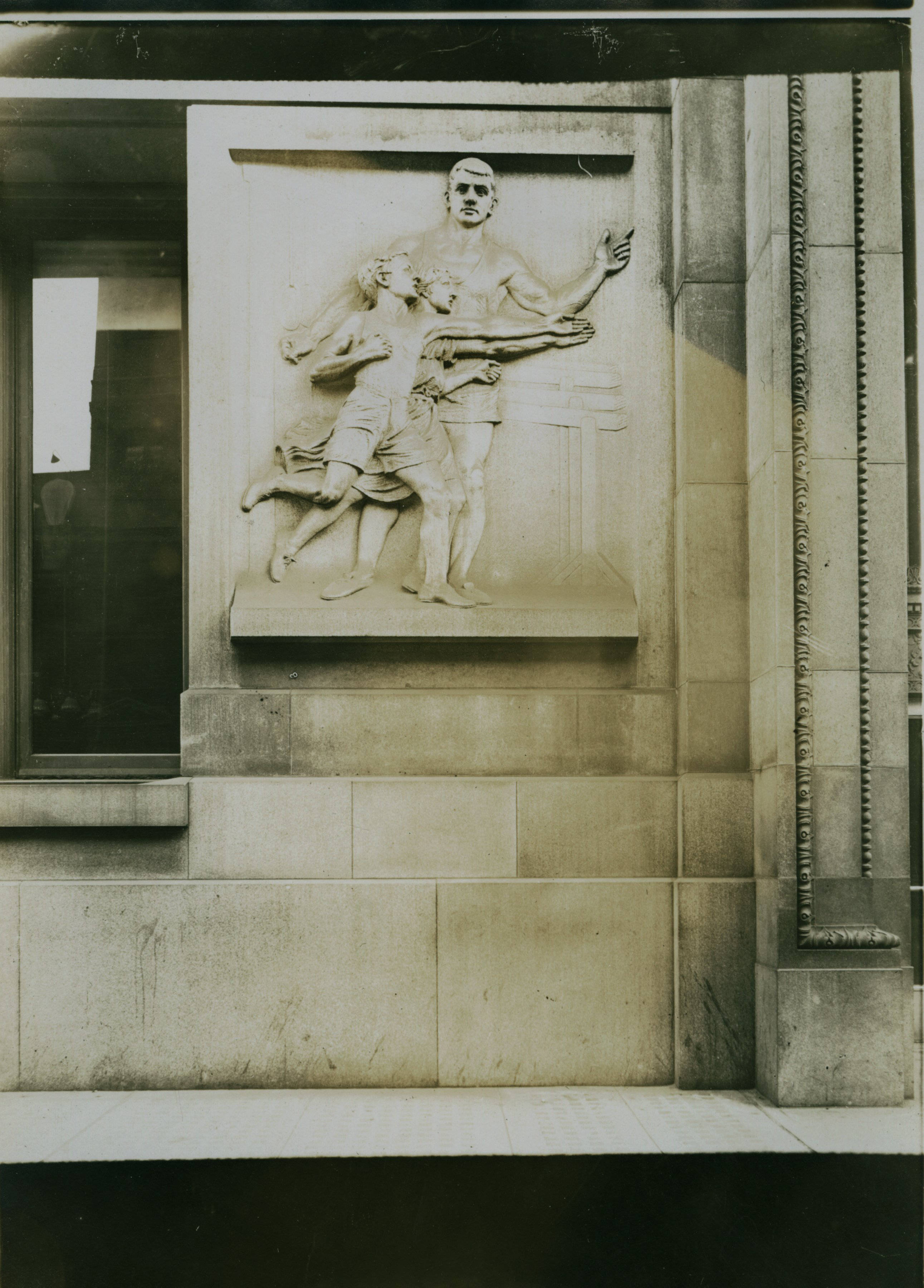

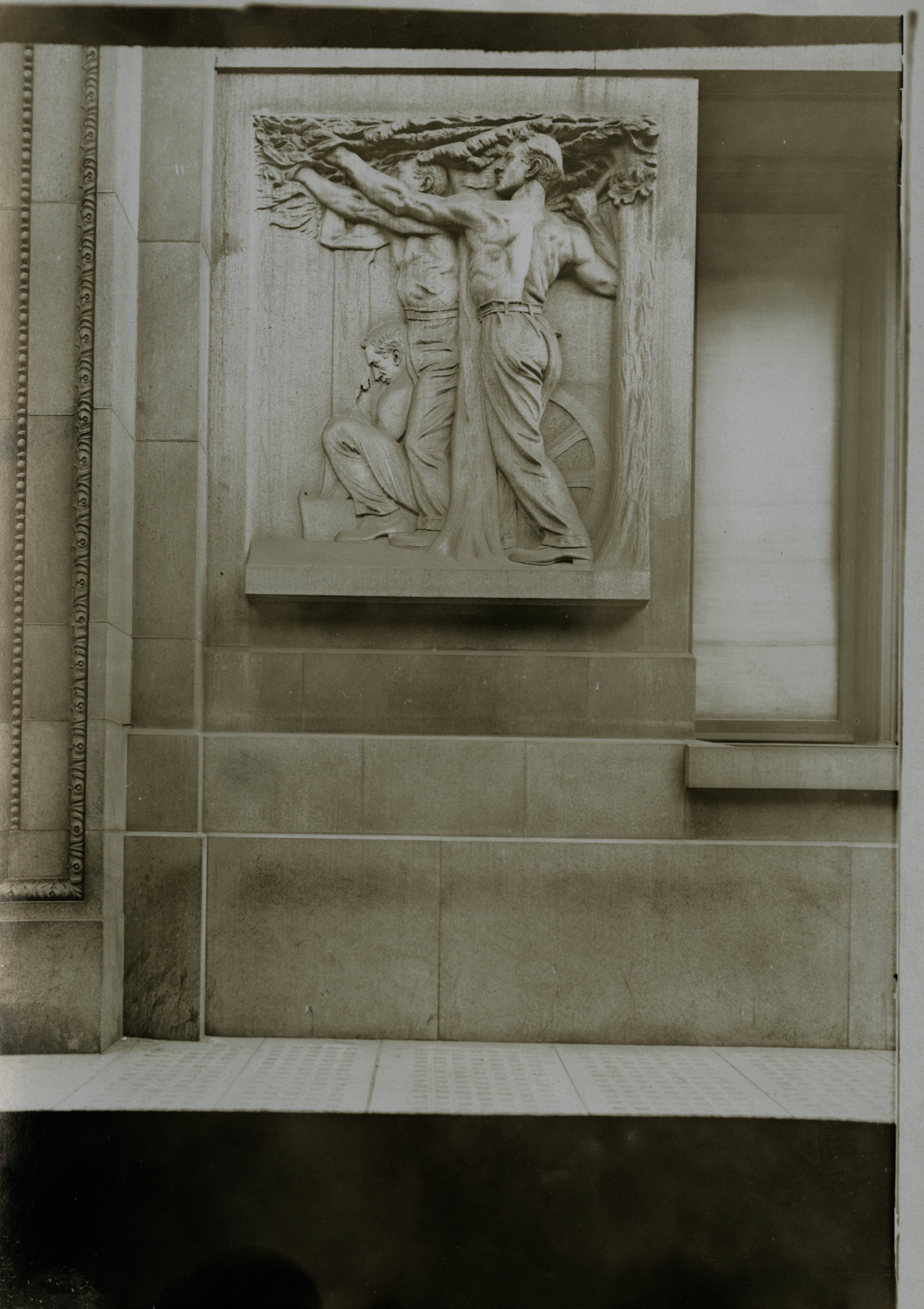

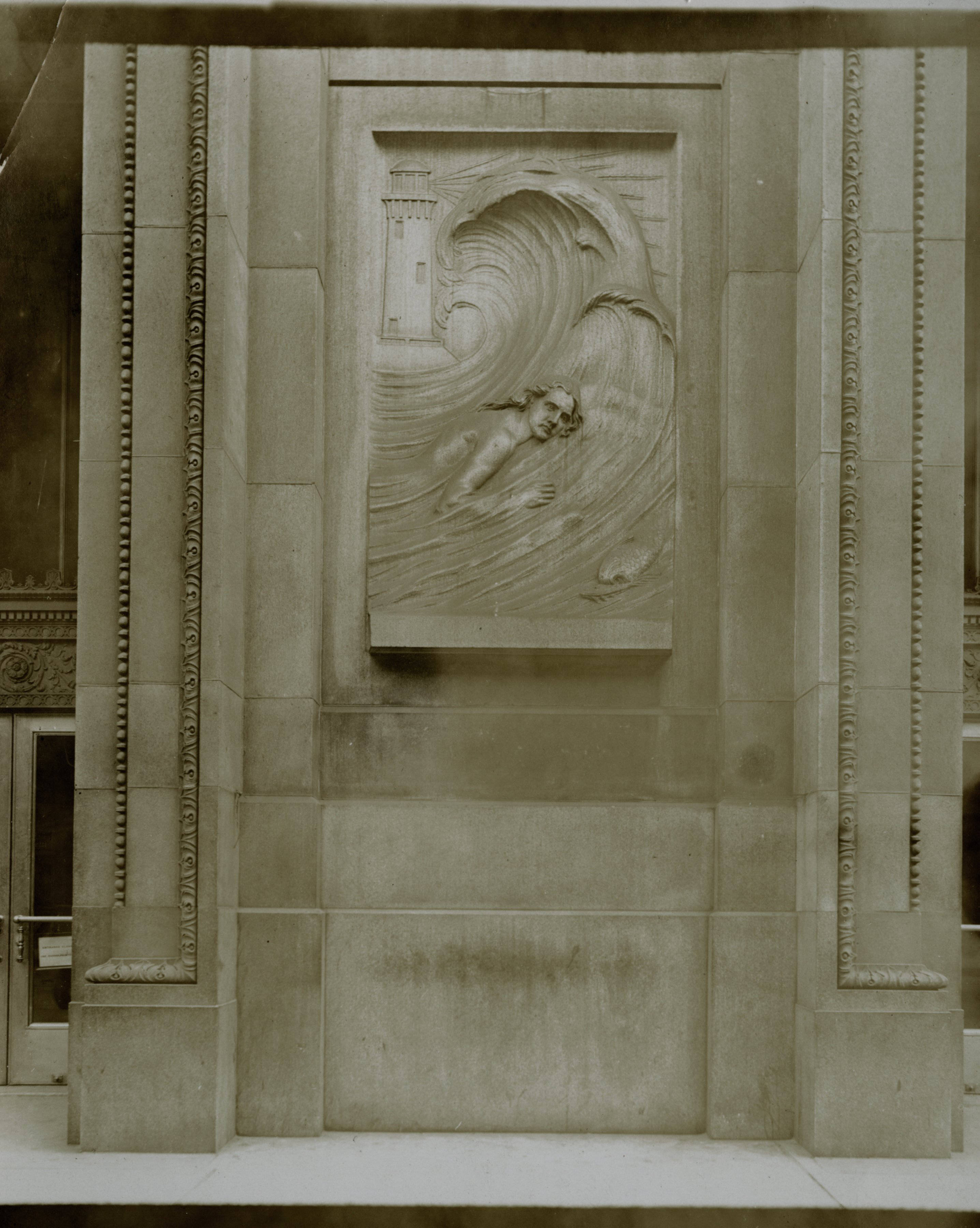
County Building Reliefs

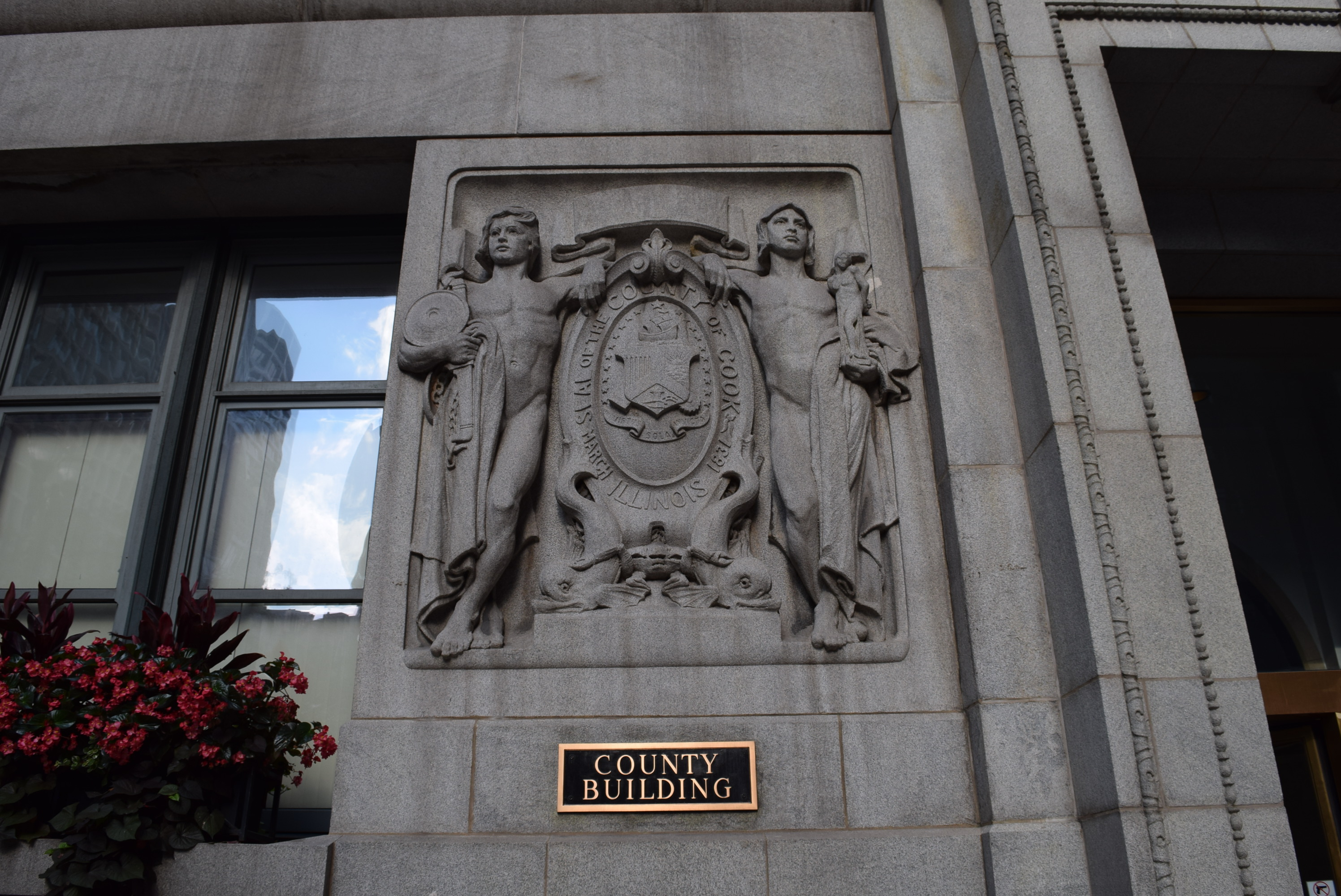

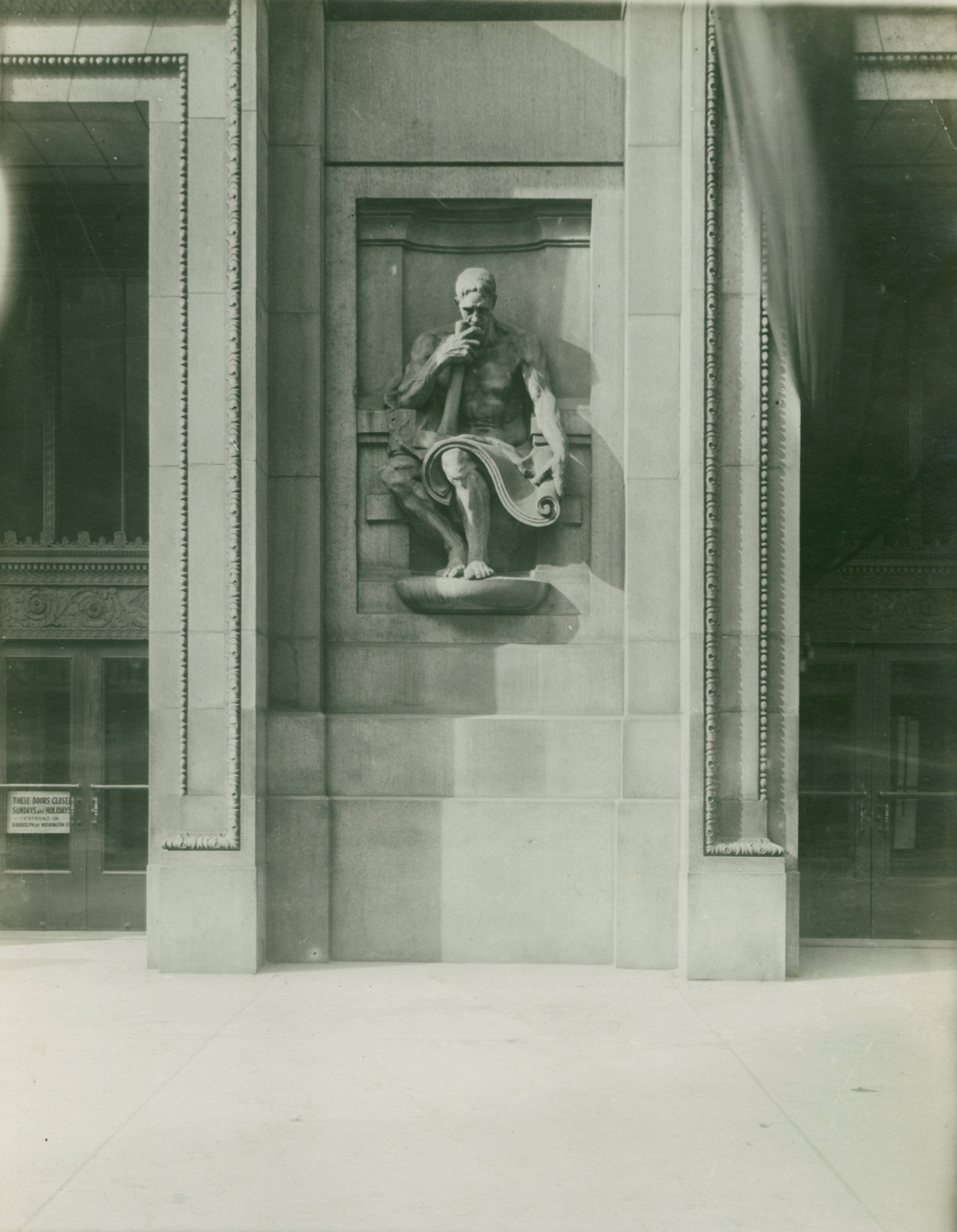

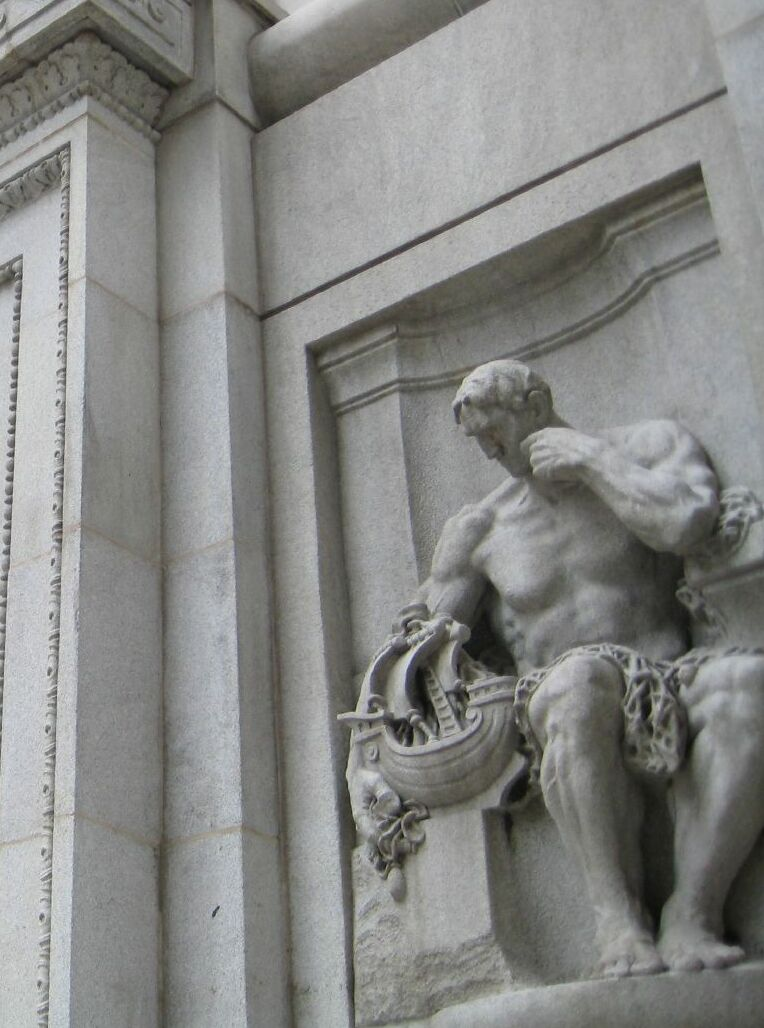

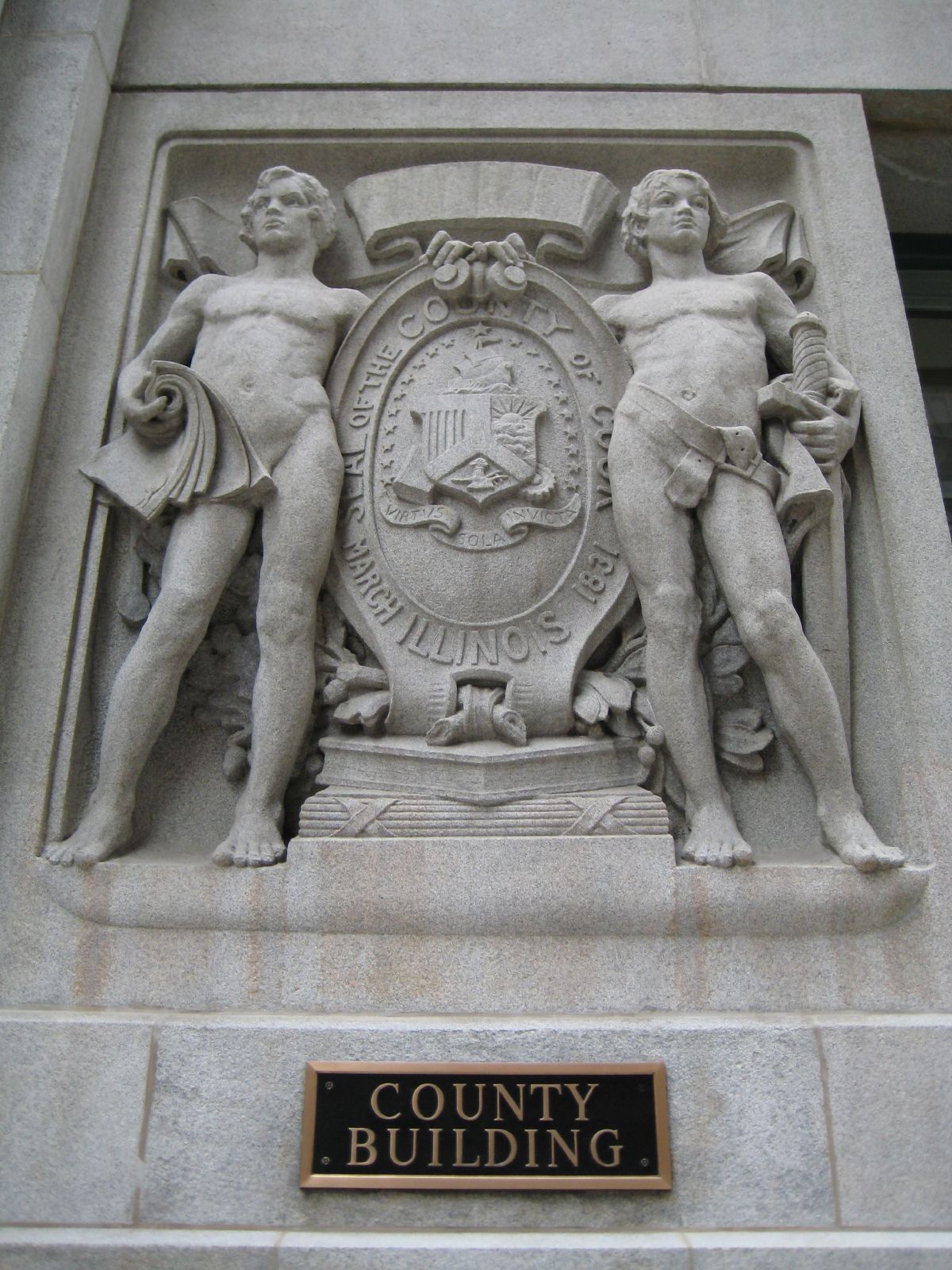

=== Green roof ===
In 2001, 38,800 square feet (3,600 m^{2}) roof gardens were completed atop the west wing serving as a pilot project to assess the impact green roofs would have on the heat island effect in urban areas, rainwater runoff, and the effectiveness of differing types of green roofs and plant species for Chicago's climate. Although the rooftop is not normally accessible to the public, it is visually accessible from 33 taller buildings in the area. The Garden consists of 20,000 plants of more than 150 species, including shrubs, vines and two trees. The green roof design team was headed by the Chicago area firm Conservation Design Forum in conjunction with noted "green" architect William McDonough. With an abundance of flowering plants on the rooftop, beekeepers harvest approximately 200 pounds (91 kg) of honey each year from hives installed on the rooftop. Tours of the green roof are by special arrangement only. The Chicago City Hall Green Roof won the Merit Design Award of the American Society of Landscape Architecture (ASLA) competition in 2002.

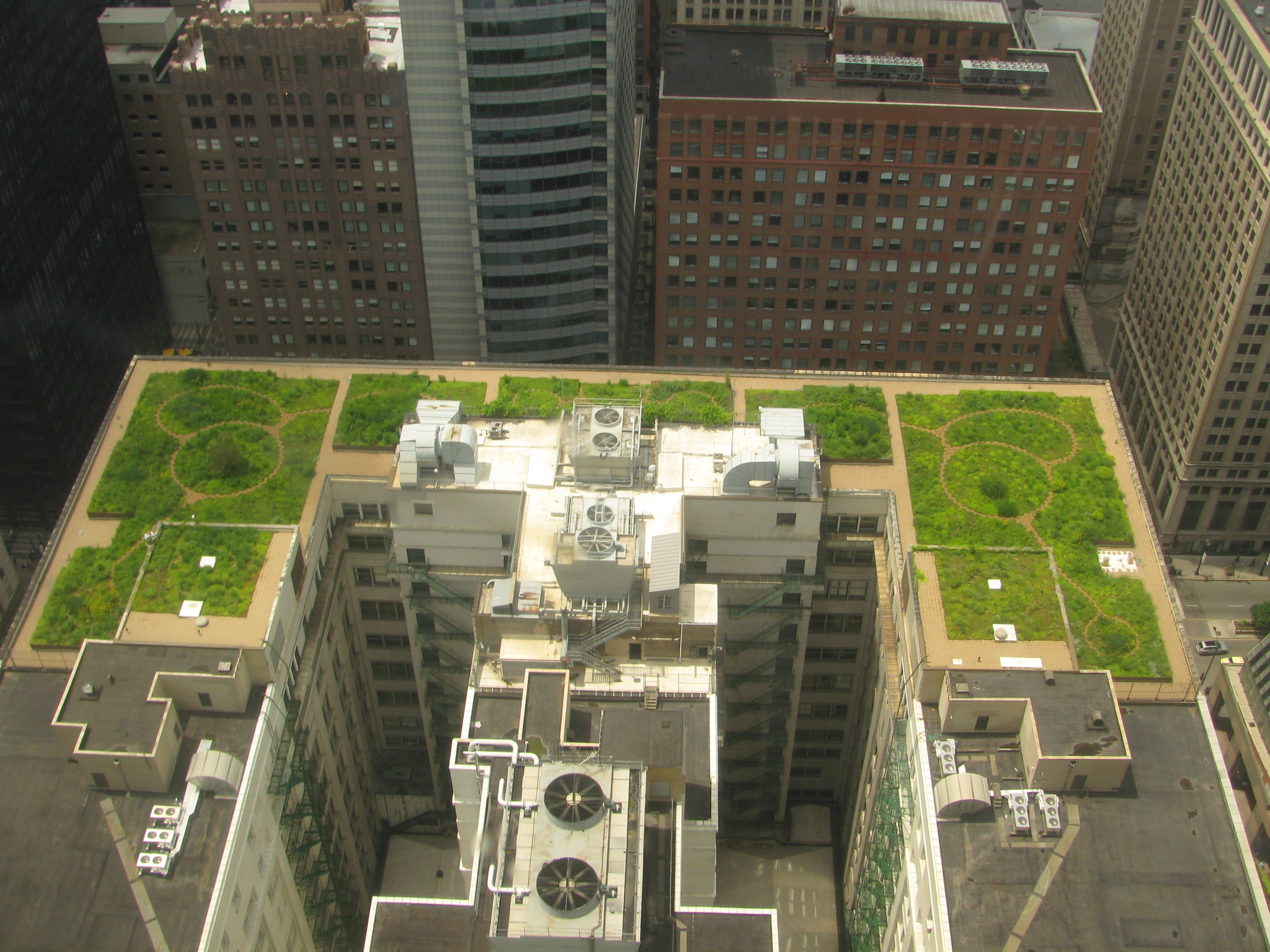
Roof garden atop city hall

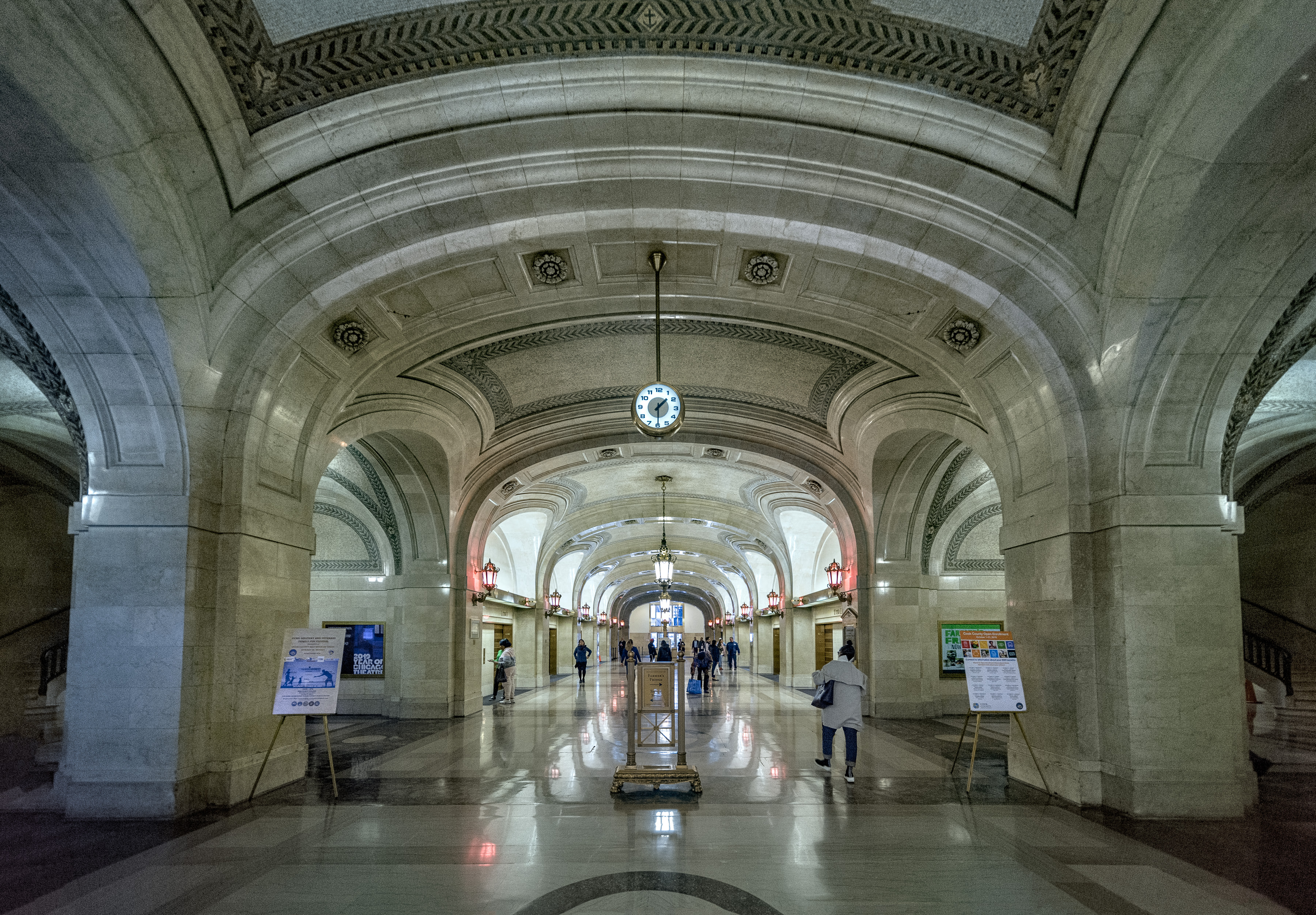
Botticino marble lobby

City Hall-County Building as seen in the January 1919 issue of National Geographic

A fasces decoration above an entrance

== In media ==
The exterior and parts of the interior of the building were featured in the climax of the 1980 comedy film The Blues Brothers, in which the titular characters, Jake and Elwood Blues, race to the building to beat a property tax deadline while being chased by police officers, firefighters, and the U.S. Military.

The building's interiors of were featured in the 1993 blockbuster movie The Fugitive, where Richard Kimble (played by Harrison Ford) is chased down the stairs by U.S. Marshal Samuel Gerard (Tommy Lee Jones), until spilling into the lobby, where Kimble narrowly escapes being apprehended by Gerard and his men.

== Agencies ==
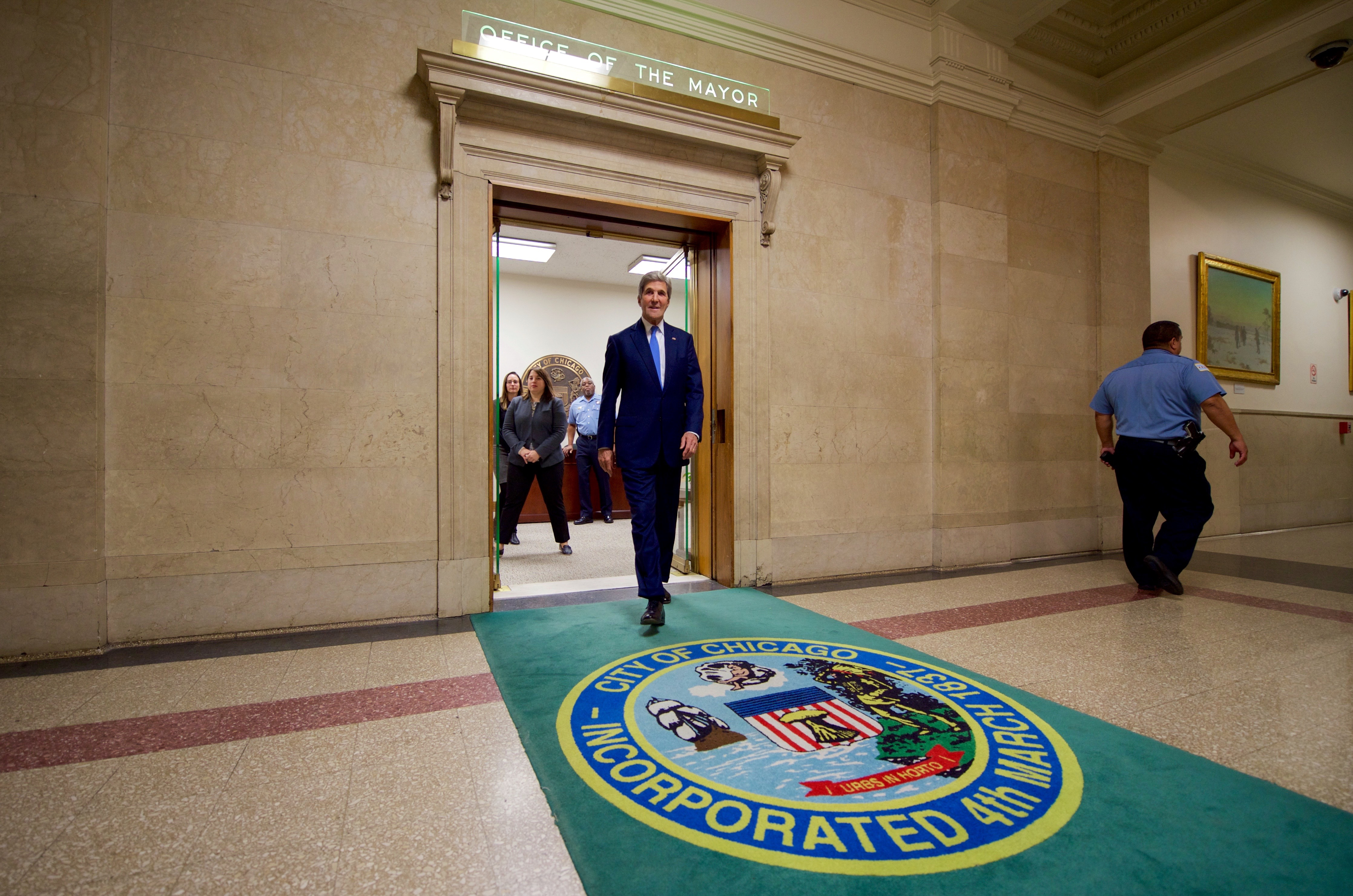
"The Fifth Floor", John Kerry leaving the mayor's office (2016)

The Following Agencies are located in the building:

- Elected Offices:
  - Office of the Mayor – 5th Floor
    - Mayor's Office for People with Disabilities
  - City Council – 2nd Floor (Council Chambers)
  - City Clerk – 1st Floor
  - Treasurer – Room 106
- Buildings Department – Room 900
- Department of Finance – 7th Floor
- Department of Law – Suite 600
- Business Affairs and Consumer Protection – 8th Floor
- Department of Planning and Development – 10th Floor
- Department of Streets and Sanitation – Room 1107
- Office of Emergency Management and Communications
- Department of Procurement Services – Room 806
- Department Human Resources
