= Australian rules football in the Riverina =

From 1881 in southwestern NSW, Australia

In the Riverina, Australian rules football is the equal most popular football code (with rugby league) and has a long history since the establishment of the Federal Football Club (founded 1861 now known as the Wagga Tigers) with the earliest recorded interclub match occurring in 1881 against the Albury Football Club (founded 1876). Unusually for New South Wales, Australian rules football is quite popular in the Murray and Southern Riverina especially in the larger cities of Albury and Wagga Wagga. The region is considered to form part of the Barassi Line which divides areas where Australian rules and rugby are popular. There are many clubs and leagues in the district, including the Riverina Football League, Farrer Football League, Hume Football League and Northern Riverina Football League. In addition, many clubs along the border play in Victorian leagues such as the Ovens & Murray Football League, Murray Football League, Picola & District Football League and the Golden Rivers Football League.

The Murray region of western New South Wales, sometimes referred to as the southern Riverina, though the state's least populated, had by 2021 become the highest per capita producer of AFL talent in the world, far surpassing Melbourne's by the same measure. The "Wagga Effect" is a term that has been used frequently in the Australian media to describe the disproportionately large number of elite sportsmen and women that originate from the region. It is speculated that the phenomenon may arise in rural areas where the population is large enough to sustain the presence of a large number of sporting codes, but small enough to ensure that talented individuals are exposed to adult-level competition at an earlier age.

== History ==
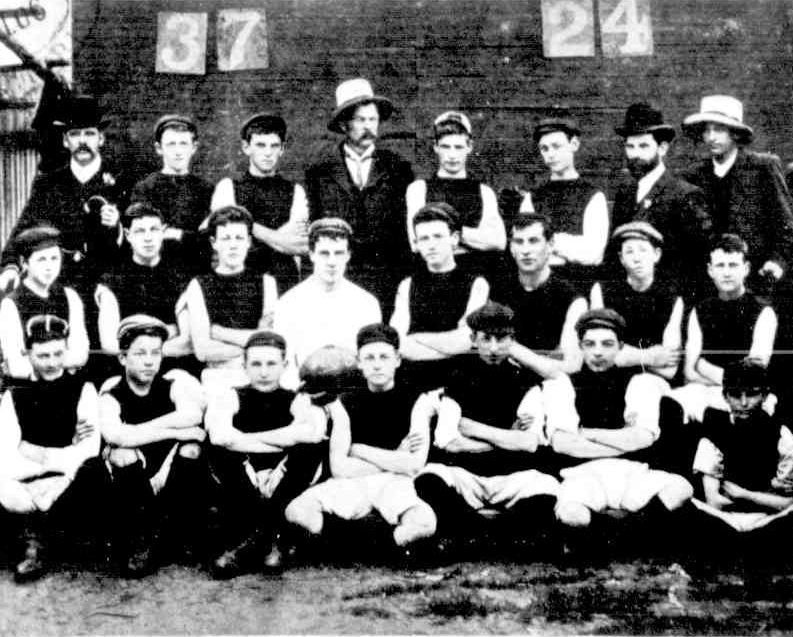
Wagga combined public schools team that defeated Sydney Fort Street Public School in 1906.

The Wagga Tigers were established in 1861 as the Federal Football Club, however details of its early history are scant, though early records appear to indicate that it aligned with Victorian rules and held local scratch matches. An 1874 ban placed on Victorian rules by the Southern Rugby Union (SRU), which governed football in New South Wales, made it extremely difficult for clubs in the region to compete, this was despite no rugby matches being played there. This did not stop the Albury Football Club from forming in 1876 to play under Victorian Rules though it was forced to cross the border to Beechworth, Victoria for its first match against the Beechworth Football Club in 1876 Newspaper records indicate that clubs like Wagga and Albury clubs were actively organising local scratch matches as early as 1878. Despite this both clubs came very close to folding due to the SRU ban and lack of local competition.

By 1882 further clubs had formed including Narrandera (1881), Albury Mechanics (1881), Wagga Mechanics (1882), while they initially struggled to coordinate with nearby clubs and typically travelled to northern Victoria, the increase in clubs introduced the possibility of local interclub competition. The earliest records of an interclub match there was in 1881 between the Federals (Wagga) and Albury Football Club in Wagga, This was just a year before the first recorded rugby union matches were held in the region. Victorian rules clubs were disallowed to respond to requests to compete with other local clubs, as such the Yass Football Club which had formed in 1878 as one of the first SRU clubs in the region, had no local opponents. Records exist of matches between Narrandera and Wagga, along with matches between Albury Mechanics and Wagga Mechanics in 1882.

Local competition between clubs commenced in earnest in 1884 around Wagga Wagga which became the Wagga Football Association. which was immensely popular and grew rapidly.

Further south towards the Murray River, the Ovens & Murray Football League included teams from Albury that formed as the Ovens & Murray Football Association in 1893.

In 1905, the Wagga Football Association representative side lost a close match against the Fitzroy Football Club at Wagga.

In 1929, Riverina separated from control of the NSWFA with its own governing body, the Southern Districts Australian National Football Council headquartered in Wagga.

In these early days, the Ovens and Murray Football League produced champion players including Haydn Bunton, Sr., who was born in Albury and played with the Albury Rovers FC, Albury Football Club, and West Albury prior to playing with Fitzroy in the VFL in 1931.

In the early 1930s, rugby league began to rapidly outgrow Australian Football in the larger centres of the Riverina. Among the main reasons was its decision to listen to the public and hold its games on Sundays and align train timetables with matches, a move which proved very popular.

In 1933, the Australian National Football Council granted the Victorian Football League direct control over the Riverina, the move effectively meant that the VFL did not have to transfers for players from New South Wales, paving the way for easier recruitment.

By the late 1930s, the popularity of Australian Football was booming in the smaller towns of the northern Riverina, displacing rugby league, particularly in Ungarie and West Wyalong.

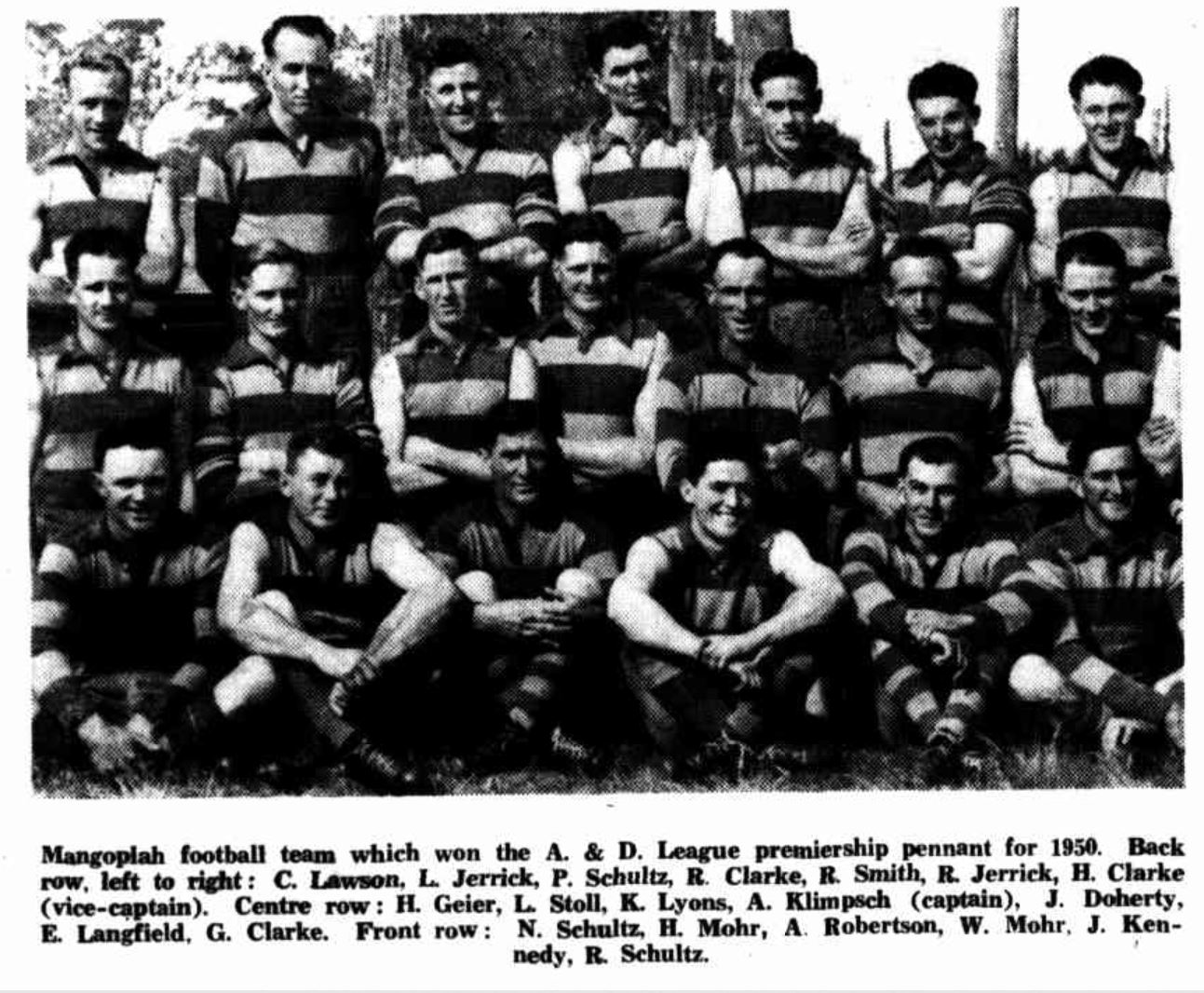
Mangoplah Football Club which won the A&DFL premiership pennant for 1950

In 1944, rugby league authorities from Sydney began a campaign to oust Australian rules from the Riverina, and were successful in having it banned from public schools in Albury, Wagga, and Junee to be replaced by Rugby League. The move was in part an effort to expand rugby league into Victoria. Rugby League successfully held schoolboy carnivals in Junee aimed at growing further south. However Victoria began directing funds to help the game survive. By 1947, the code began making a comeback in Narrandera, where rugby league had taken over. By 1951, however it was once again under threat in Junee, Leeton, Griffith and Wagga. However, in 1953, Australian Football was once again declared the most popular code in the region with huge crowds and gate takings across the northern Riverina including Leeton, Griffith, Narrandera and Culcairn.

In 1982, at the instigation of the Victorian Country Football League (who had jurisdiction over the area at the time), the South Western District Football League, the Farrer Football League, and the Central Riverina Football League were all combined into the Riverina Football League and the Riverina District Football League. The district league reverted to the Farrer Football League in 1985. There were two divisions of the Riverina DFL / Farrer FL between 1983 and 1994. In 1995, these two leagues were part of the Murrumbidgee Valley Australian Football Association.

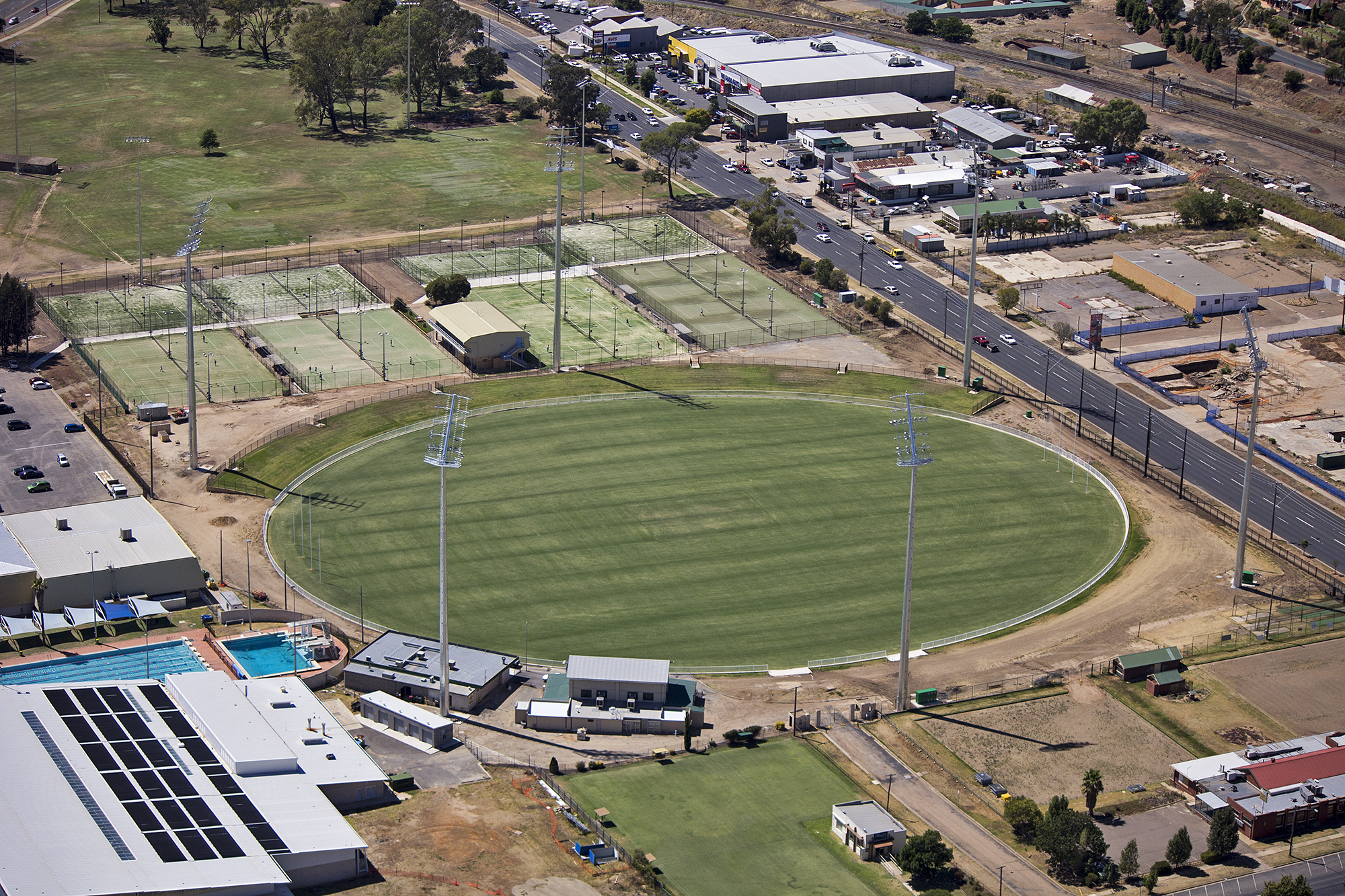
Robertson Oval Wagga, from the air, is one of the larger RFNL venues

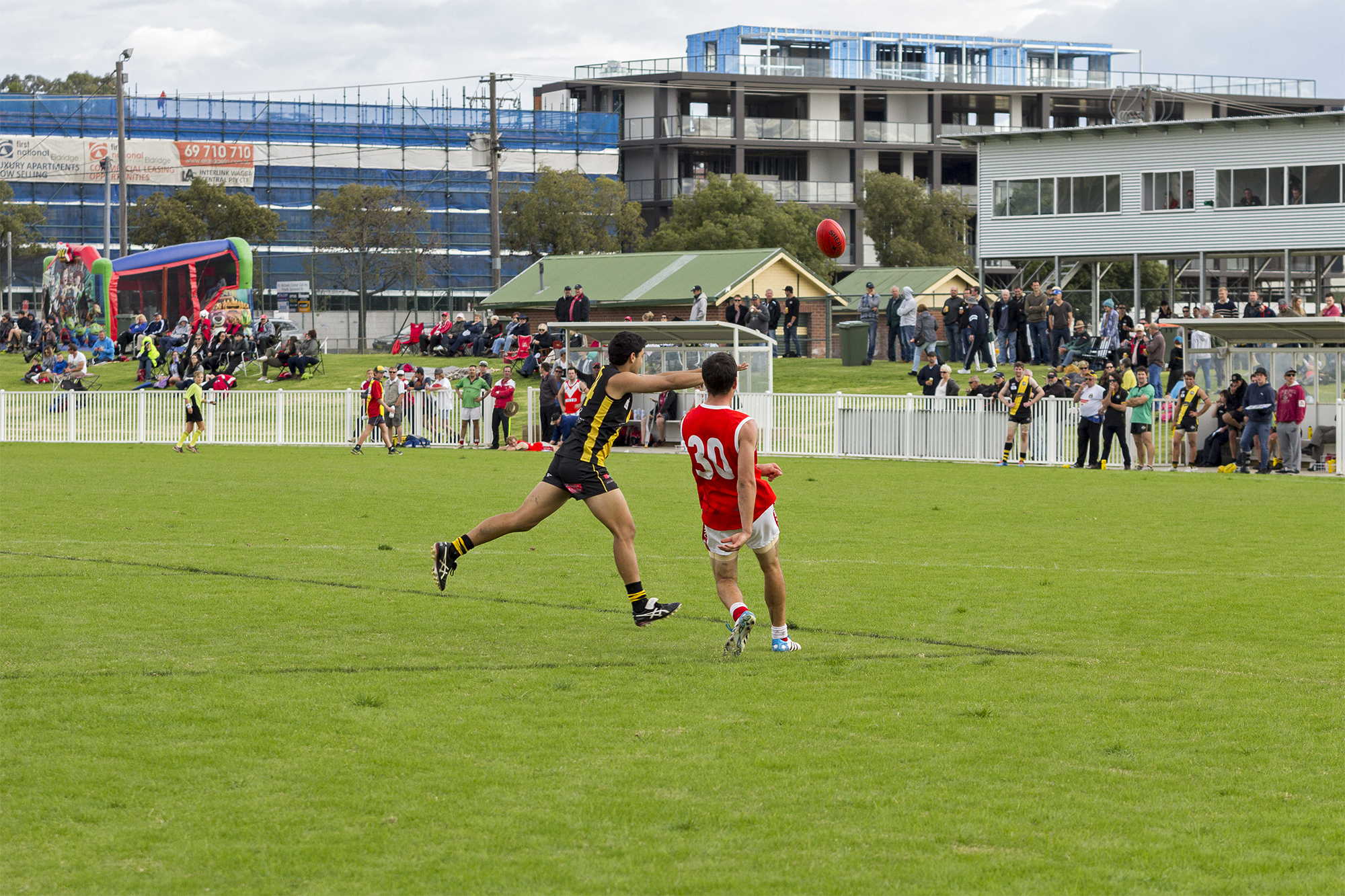
RFNL match between Wagga Tigers and Collingullie at Robertson Oval in 2015

At the conclusion of the 2007 season, the Coreen league was disbanded with most of its clubs joining the Hume league for the 2008 season.

According to studies in the 2010s and 2020s, Australian rules football is continuing to expand north into the northern Riverina, one of the only areas of the Barassi line which are moving.

== Competitions ==
=== Current Competitions ===
League	Years	Senior clubs	Divisions	Headquarters	Notes/References
Northern Riverina Football League	1924-	5	1	West Wyalong	
Hume Football League	1933-	9	1	Walla Walla	
Farrer Football League	1957-	9	1	Wagga Wagga	
Riverina Football Netball League	1982-	9	1	Wagga Wagga	

=== Past Competitions ===
League	Years with Riverina clubs	Senior clubs	Divisions	Headquarters	Notes/References
Wagga Football Association	1888-1889			Wagga Wagga, New South Wales	
Wagga United Football Association	1897			Wagga Wagga, New South Wales	
Murrumbidgee District Football Association	1897			Wagga Wagga, New South Wales	
Federal District Football Association	1897–1902			Cobram, Victoria	
Wagga United Football Association	1898–1921			Wagga Wagga, New South Wales	
Deniliquin Football Association	1900–1932			Deniliquin, New South Wales	
McLaurin Football Competition	1901				
Southern Riverina Football Association	1905–1931				
Greengunyah Football Association	1906				
Corowa & District Football Association	1906–1907			Corowa, New South Wales	
Central Riverina Football League	1907				
Lockhart Football Association	1908–1909, 1911–1914, 1921, 1925				
Coreen & District Football Association	1909–1930				
The Rock Football Association	1910–1911, 1914				
Culcairn & District Football Association	1910–1913, 1919–1921			Culcairn, New South Wales	
Ganmain Football Association	1910-1913			Wagga Wagga, New South Wales	
Barellan & District Football Association	1912				
South West Football League	1913-1981			Narrandera, New South Wales	
Walbundrie Football Association	1914				
Milbrulong Football Association	1914–1915				
Walla Walla Football Association	1915–1916, 1919–1921			Walla Walla, New South Wales	
Urangeline Football Association	1919–1926				
Faithful & District Football Association	1920–1939				
Borree Creek Football Association	1922				
Riverina Mainline Football Association	1922			Wagga Wagga, New South Wales	
Hume Football Association	1922–1926				
Lockhart Oaklands Line Football Association	1923–1924				
Wagga United Football Association	1923-1925			Wagga Wagga, New South Wales)	
The Rock and District Association	1926–1927			Wagga Wagga, New South Wales	
Wagga and District Association	1926–1927			Wagga Wagga, New South Wales	
Osborne & District Football Association	1927–1928				
Wagga Football Association	1928–1957			Wagga Wagga, New South Wales	
Lockhart & District Lines Football Association	1929				
Central Hume Football Association	1929–1934				
Albury & District Football League	1930-1957			Albury, New South Wales	
Corowa & District Football Association	1931–1935				
Coreen & District Football League	1936–2007				

== Players ==
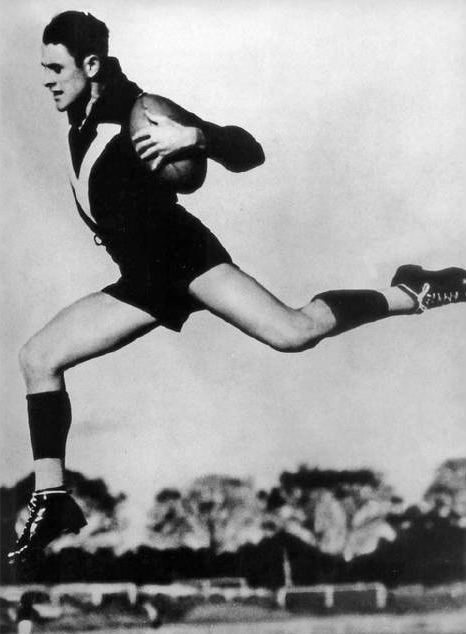
Haydn Bunton, an Australian Football legend from the 1930s and 1940s in a photo that became the basis of a statue outside the Melbourne Cricket Ground.

Early in the 20th Century notable players included Haydn Bunton, Denis Ryan, Gordon Strang, Doug Strang and Maurie Hunter. During the 1970s, the region produced a famous footballer family, the Danihers from the Ungarie Football Club: Terry Daniher, Neale Daniher, Anthony Daniher, and Chris Daniher. In the modern era, the Riverina had many players for the VFL/AFL, including champions such as Wayne Carey, Paul Kelly, Dennis Carroll, John Longmire, Leo Barry, Shane Crawford, and Brett Kirk. Some other players from the region to have played AFL level football include Isaac Smith, Luke Breust, Zac Williams, Dean Terlich, and Sam Rowe.

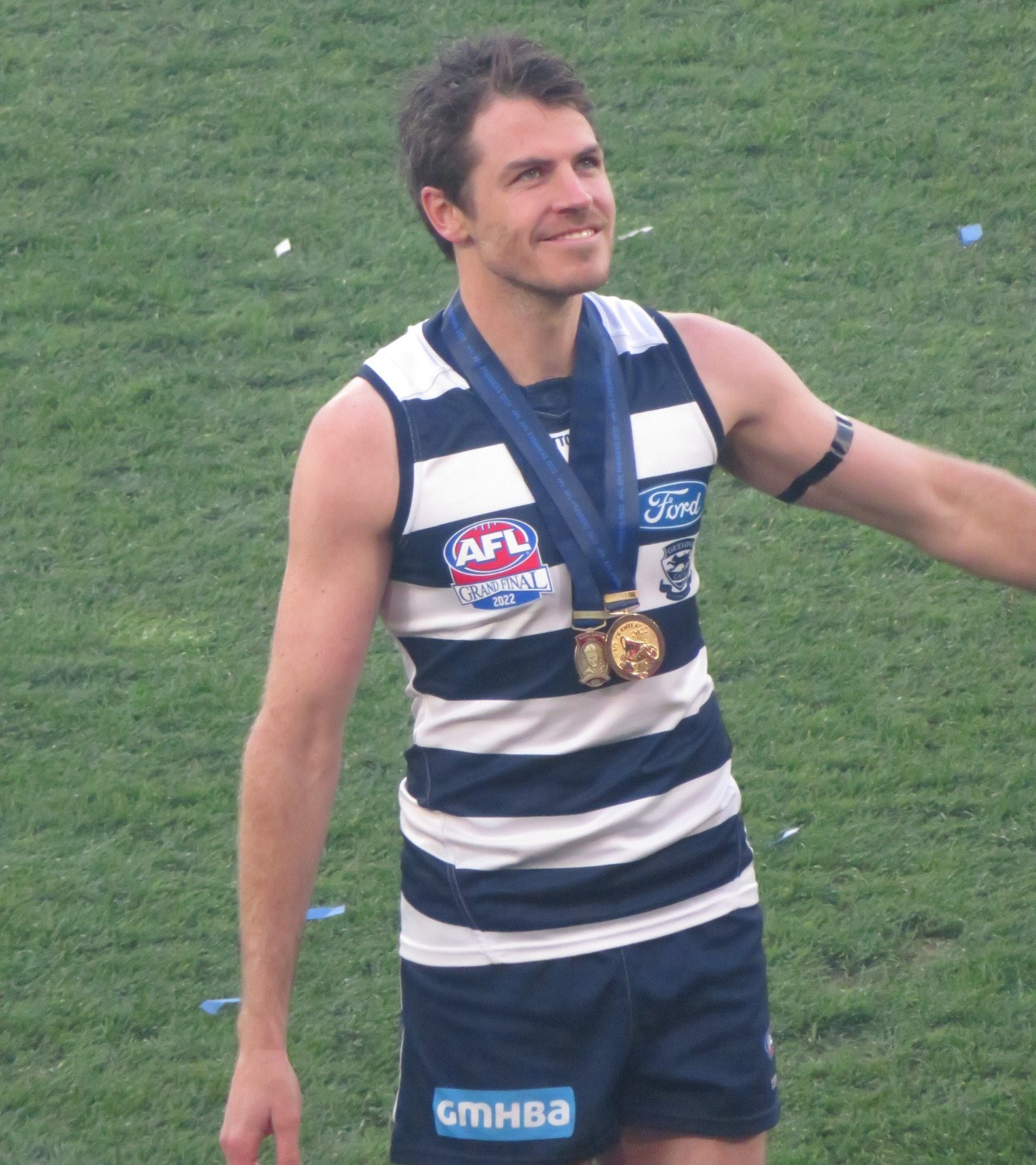
Isaac Smith, 4 time premiership player is from Cootamundra

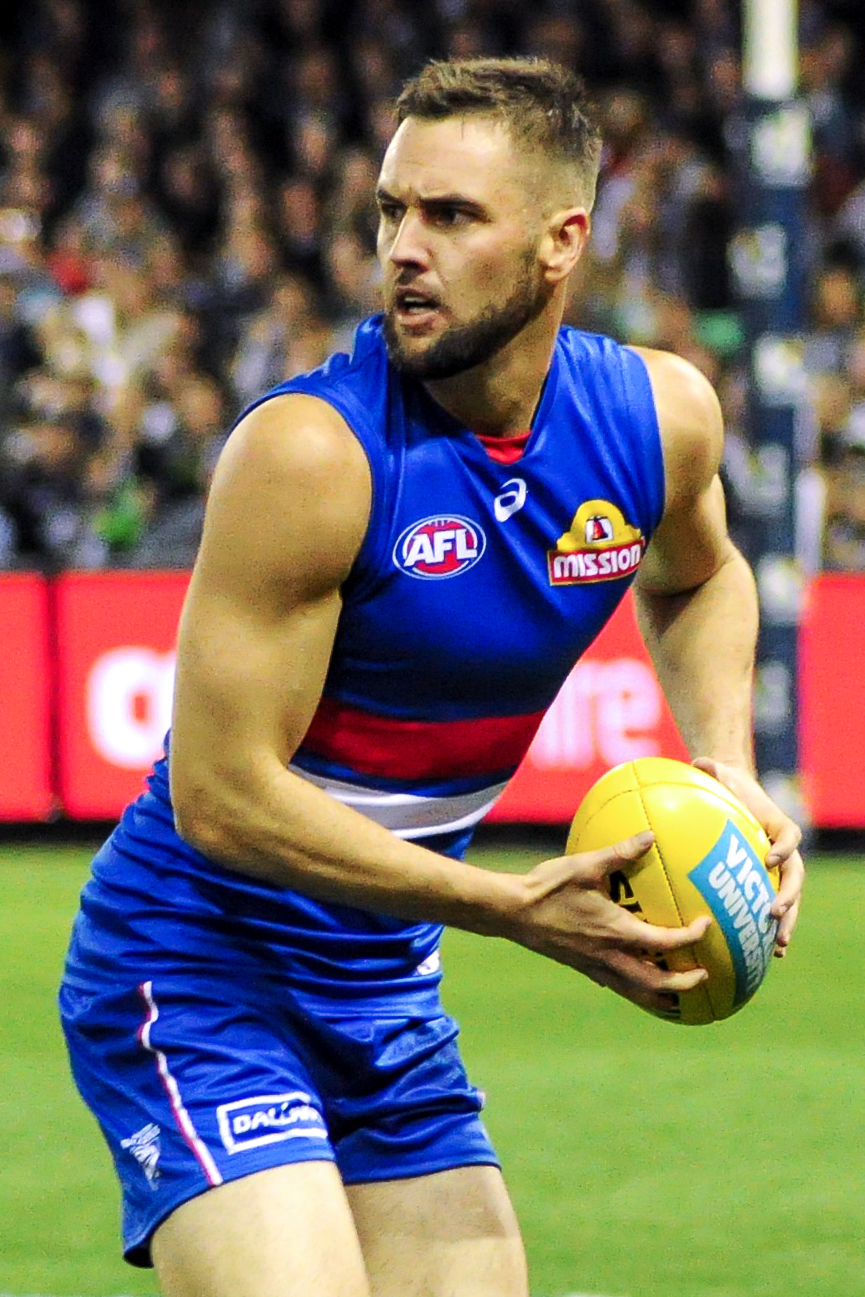
Matt Suckling, premiership player, is from Wagga

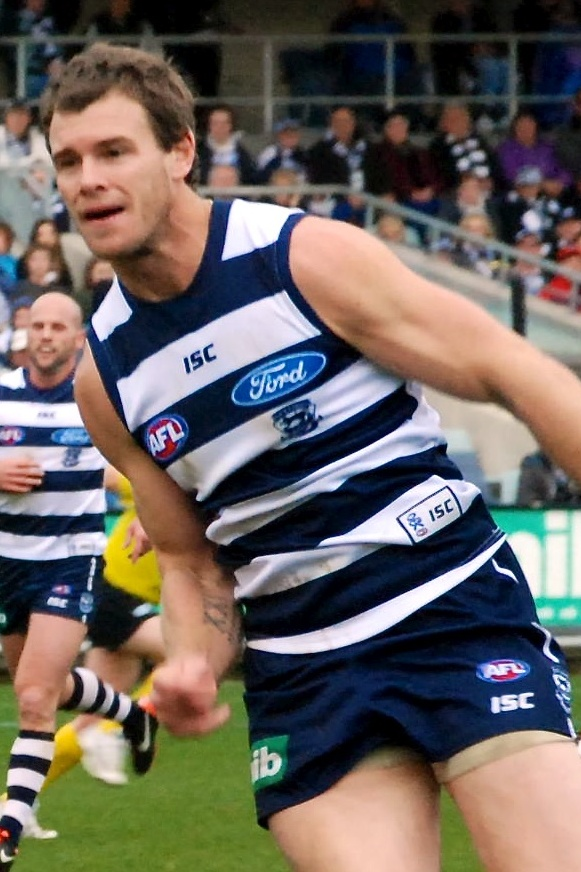
Cameron Mooney 3 time premiership player is from Wagga Waggaa

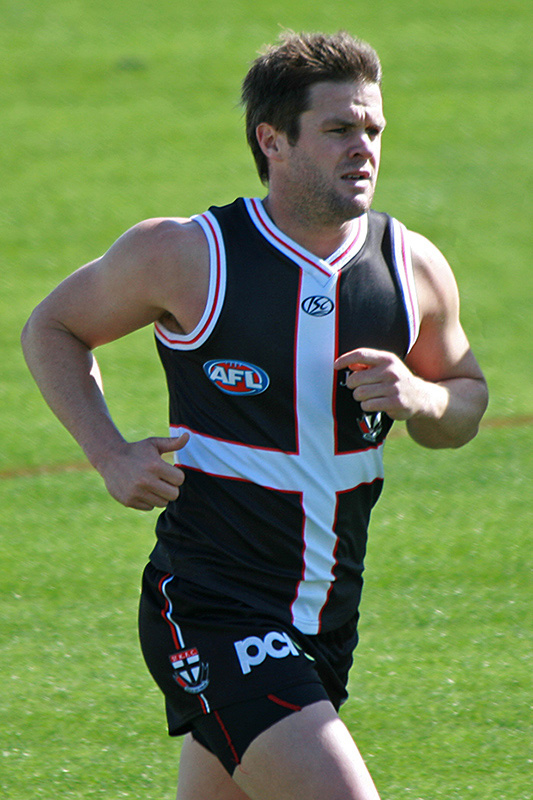
Adam Schneider Sydney premiership player is from Osborne

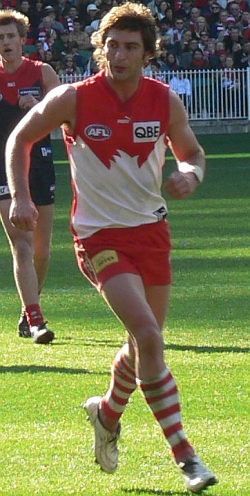
Brett Kirk, Sydney Swans premiership player and coach is from Albury

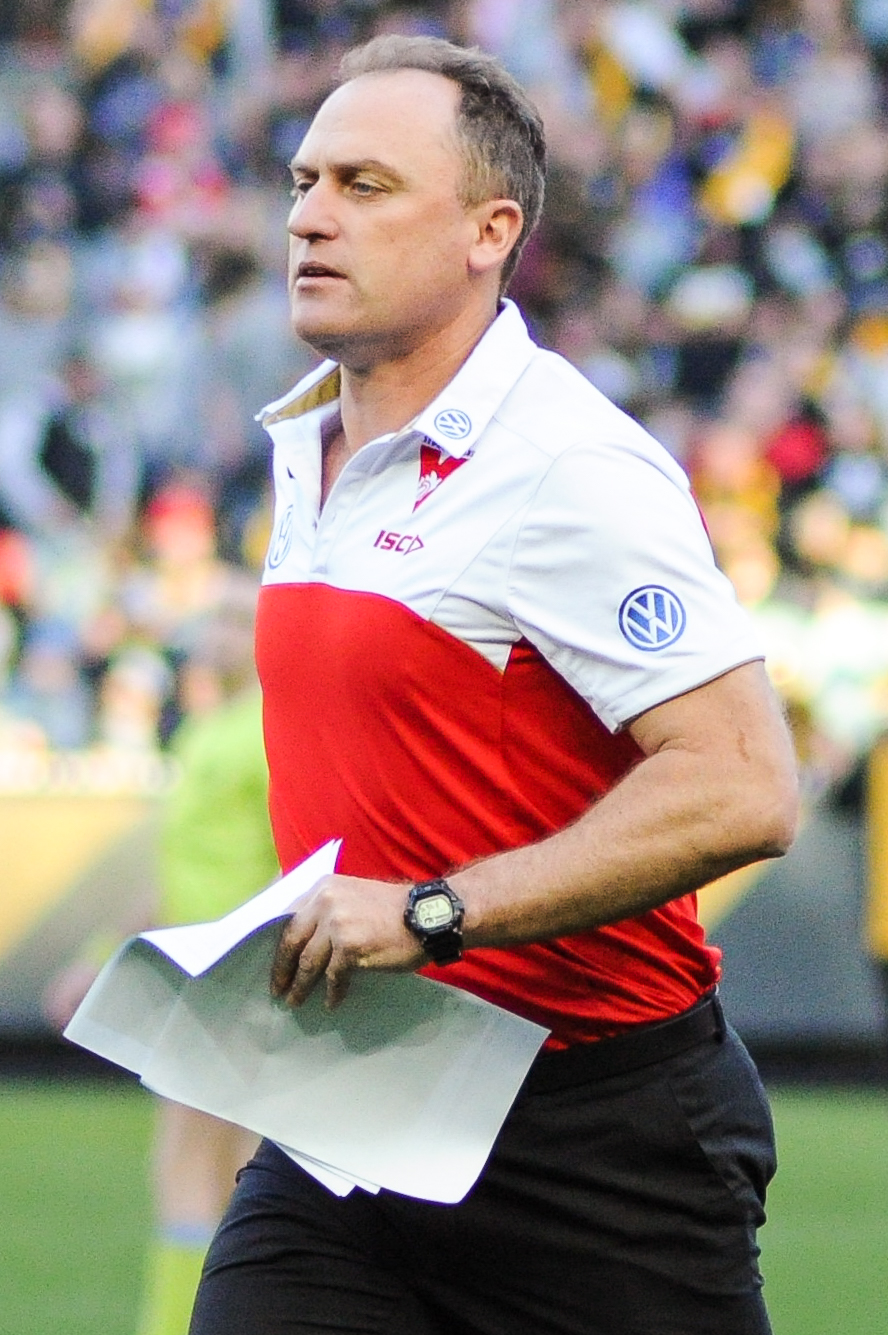
John Longmire premiership player and coach is from Corowa

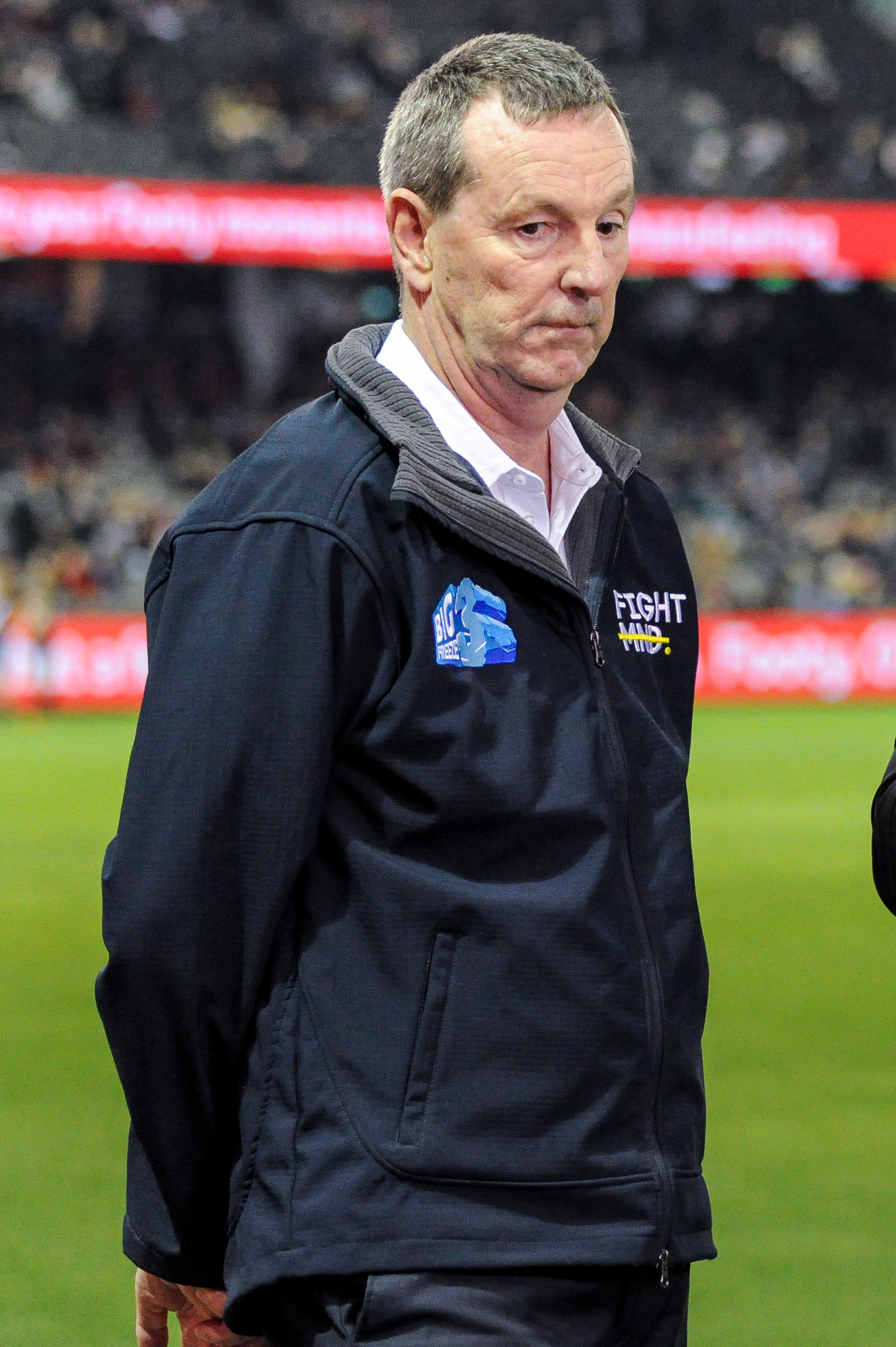
Neale Daniher is from West Wyalong

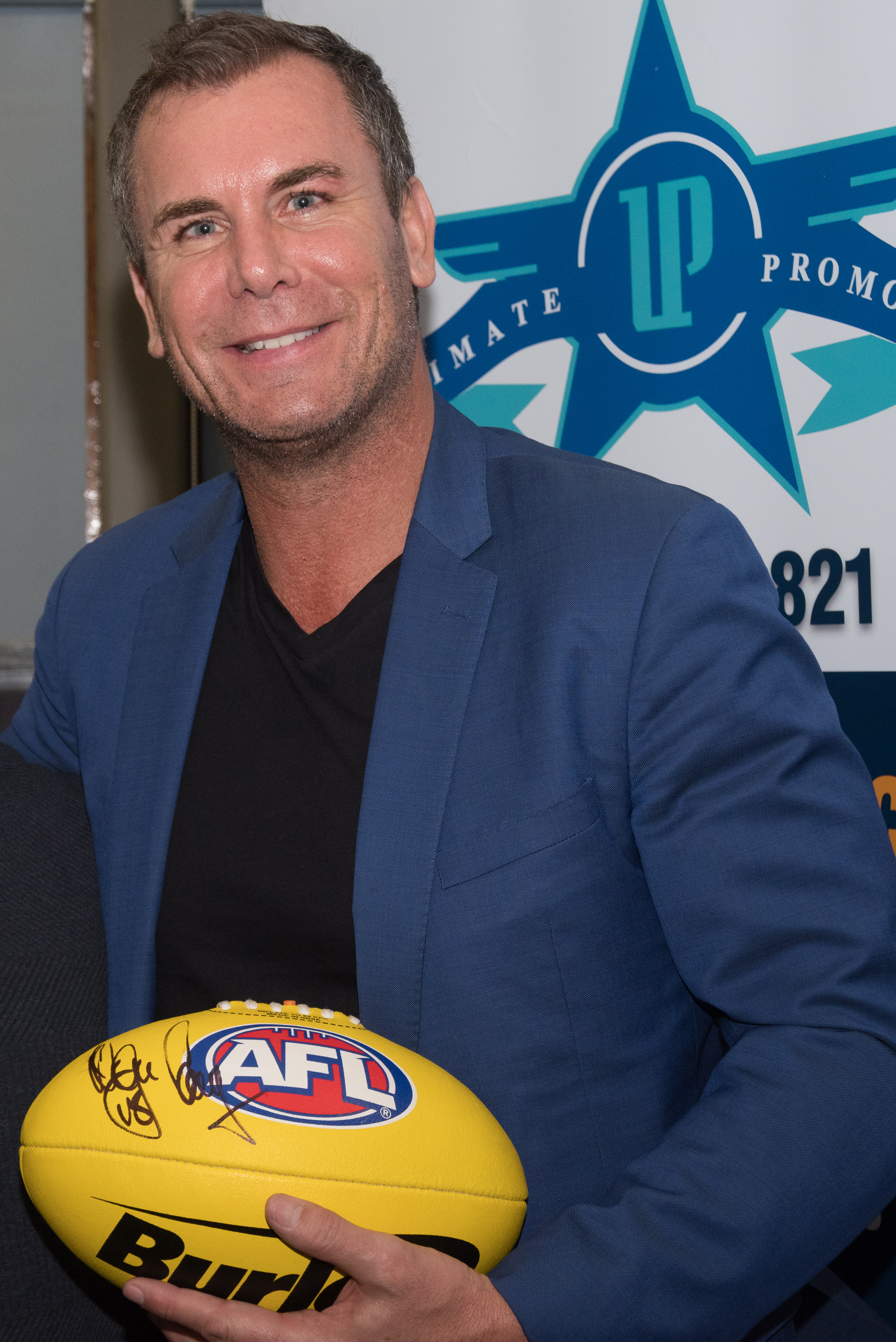
Wayne Carey 2 time premiership captain is from Wagga

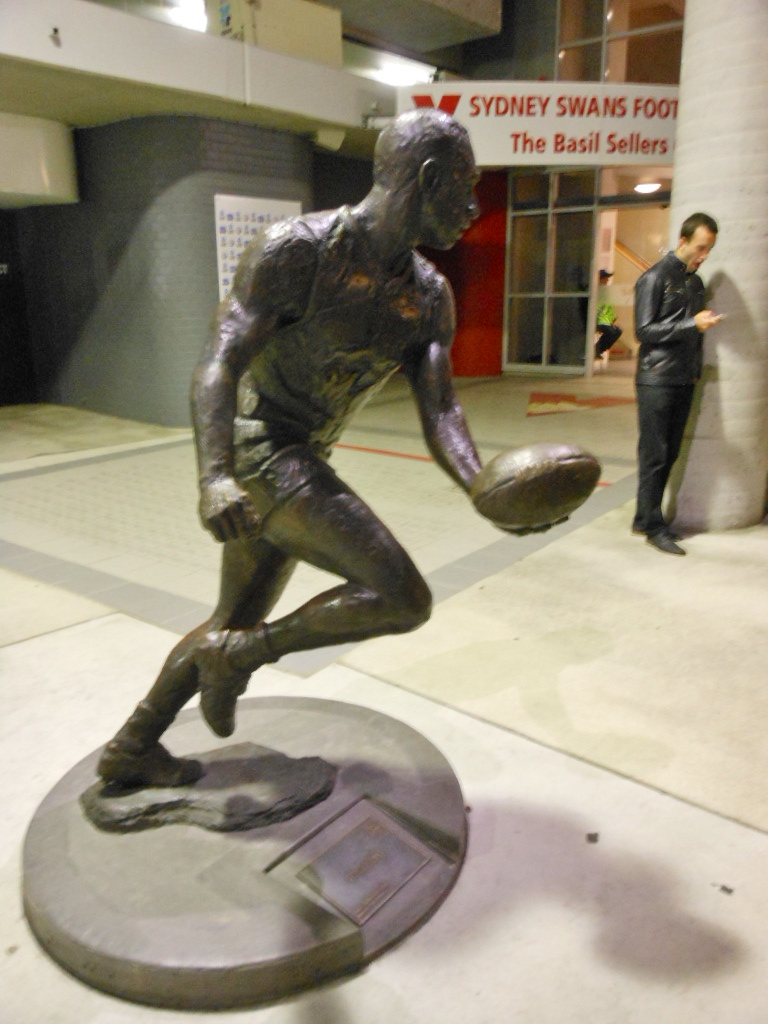
Statue of Paul Kelly, Brownlow Medallist Sydney Swans captain and rugby league convert was from Wagga

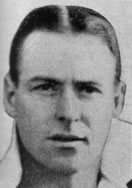
Bill Mohr of Wagga kicked 735 league goals

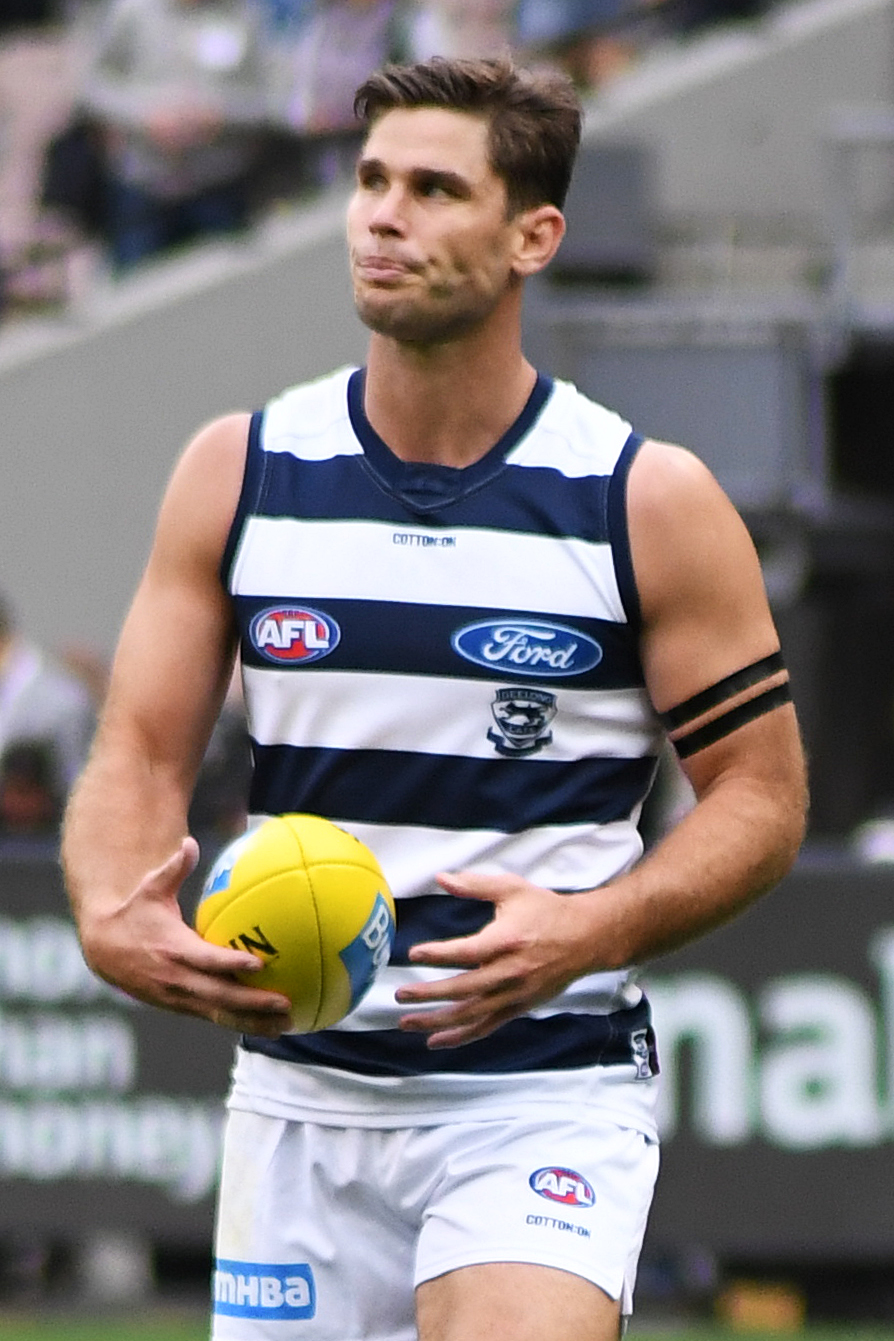
Tom Hawkins, Geelong premiership player is from Finley

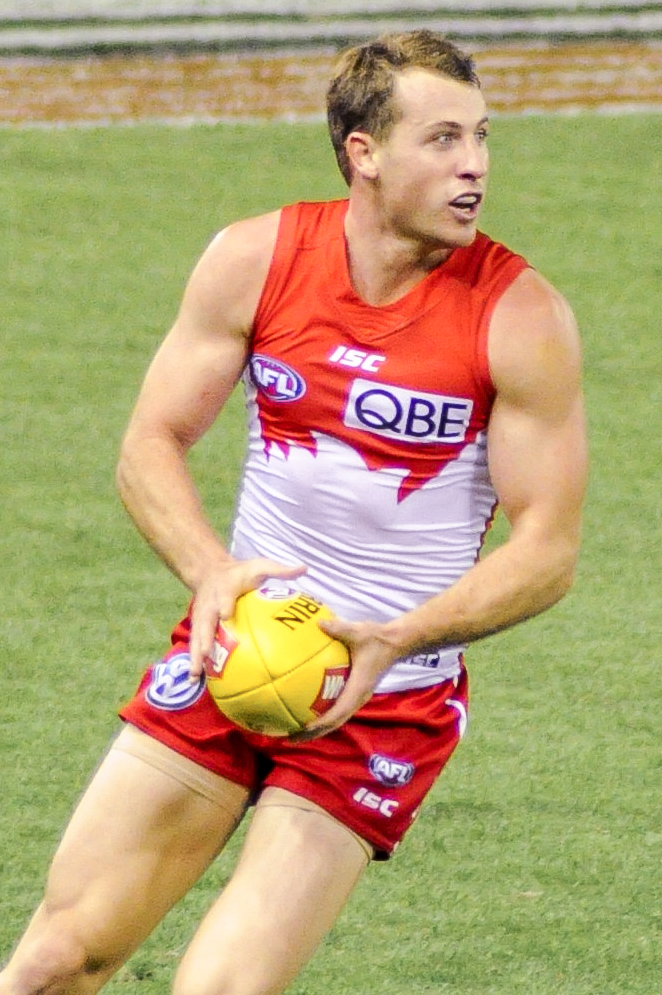
Harry Cunningham is from Wagga Wagga

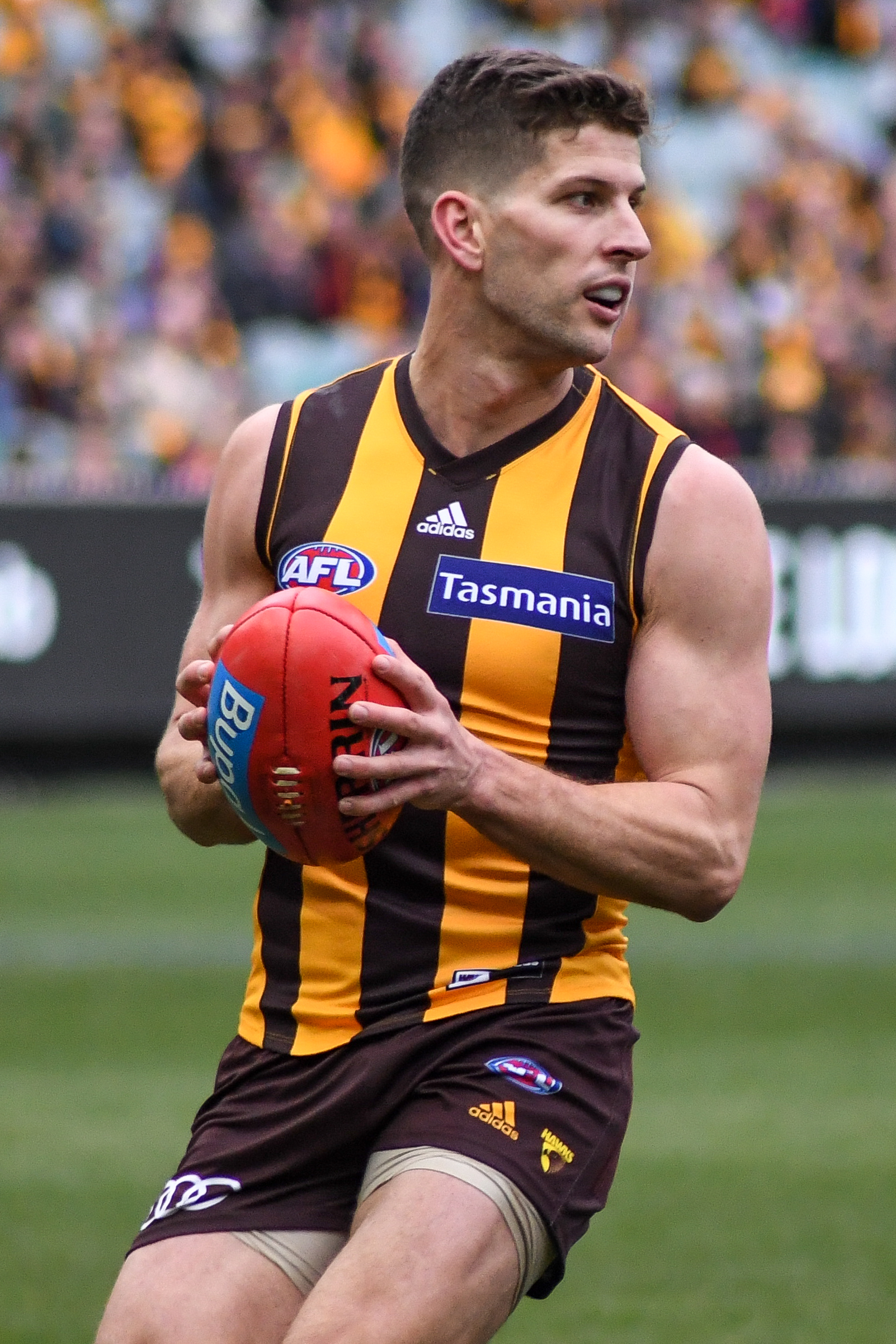
Luke Breust, Hawthorn premiership player is from Temora

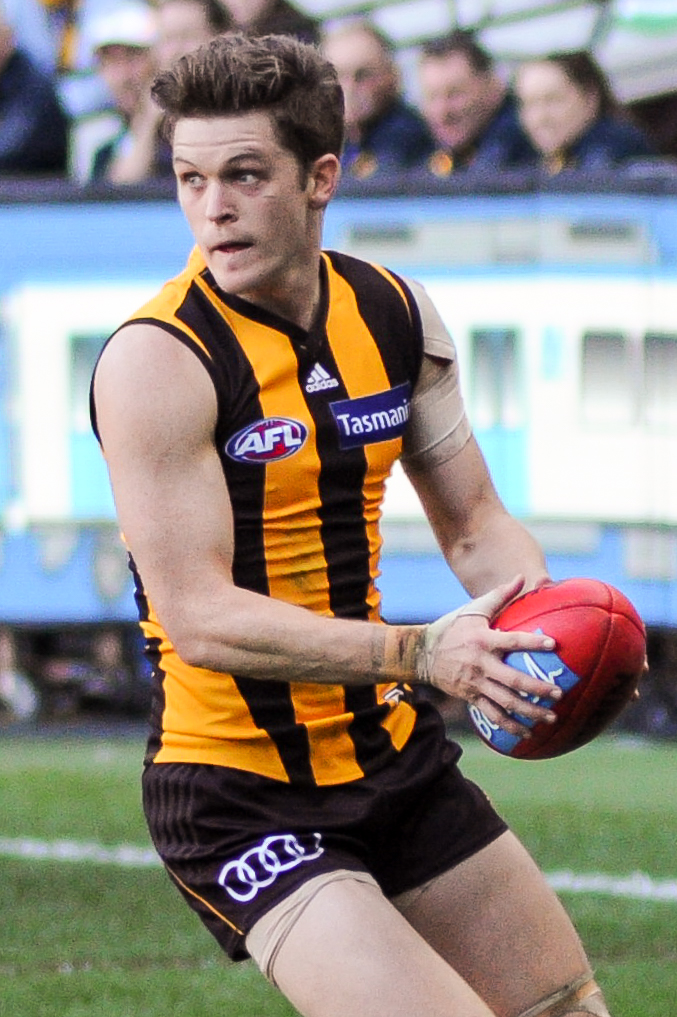
Taylor Duryea, Hawthorn premiership player is from Corowa

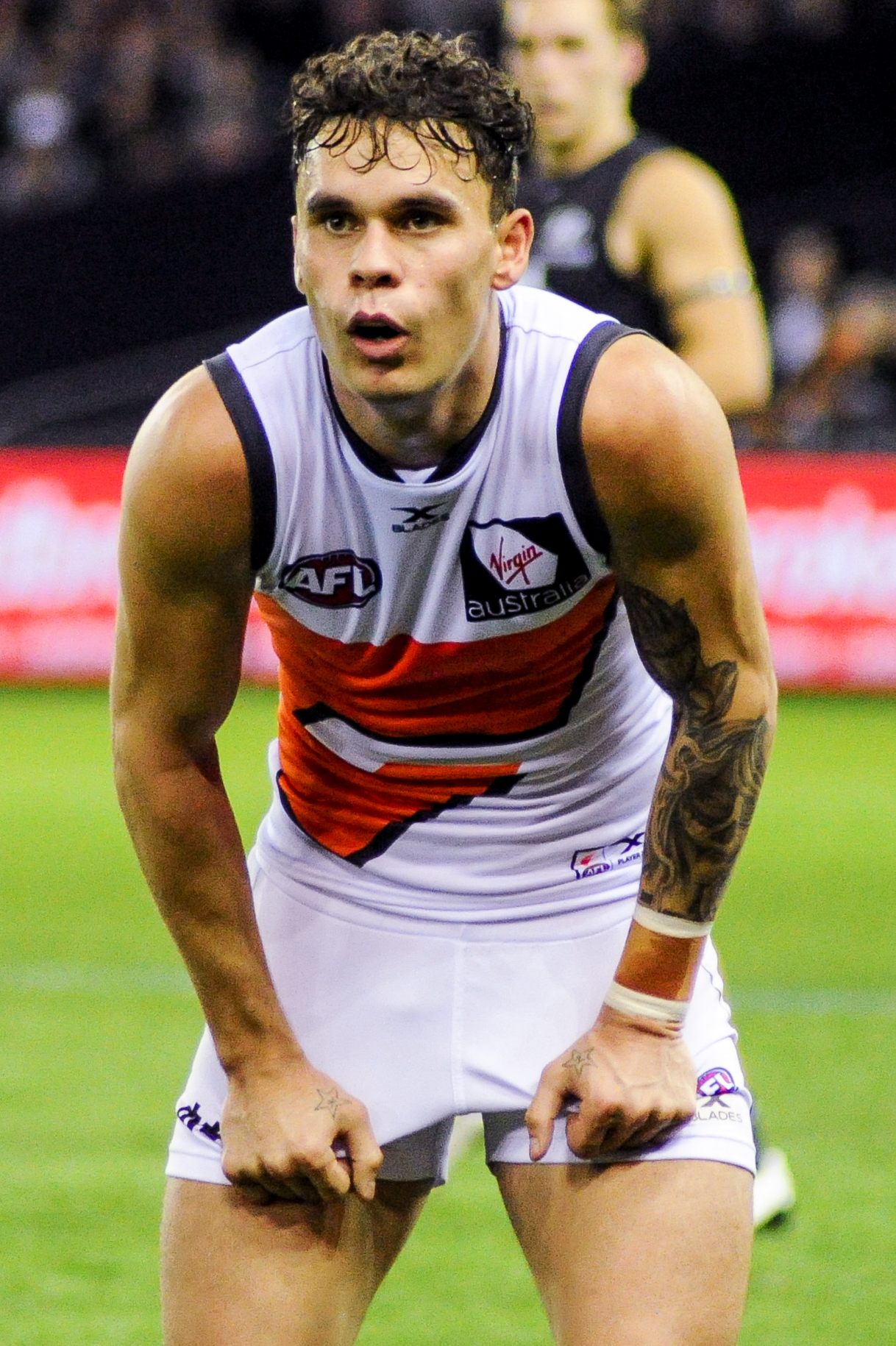
Zac Williams is from Narrandera

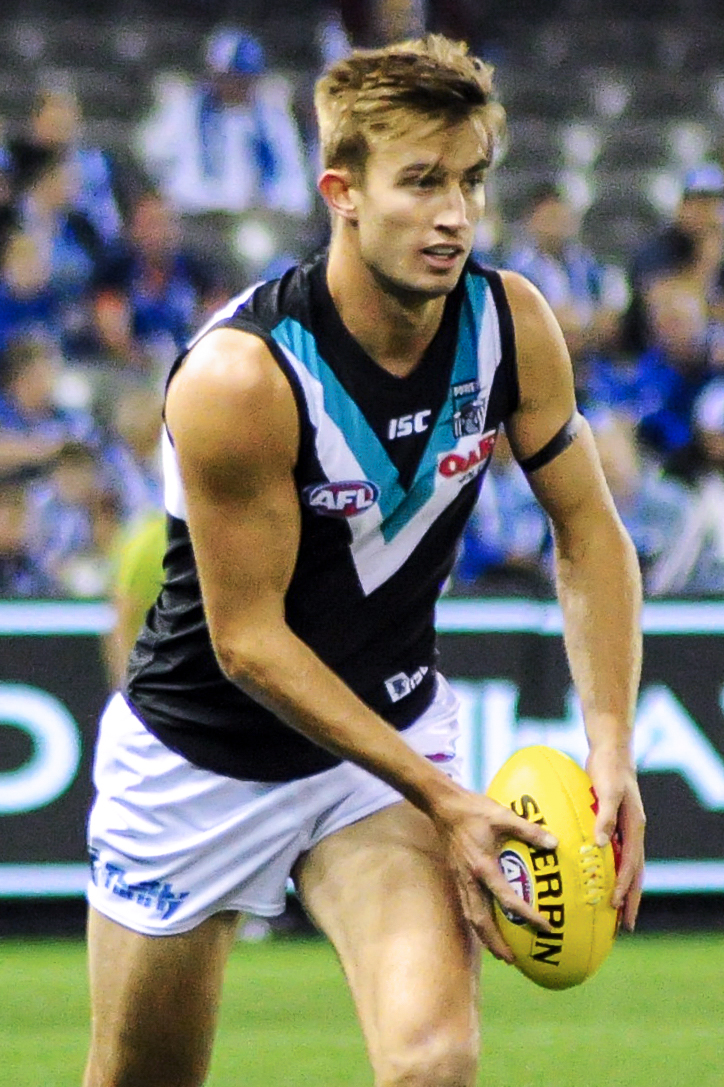
Dougal Howard is from Wagga Wagga

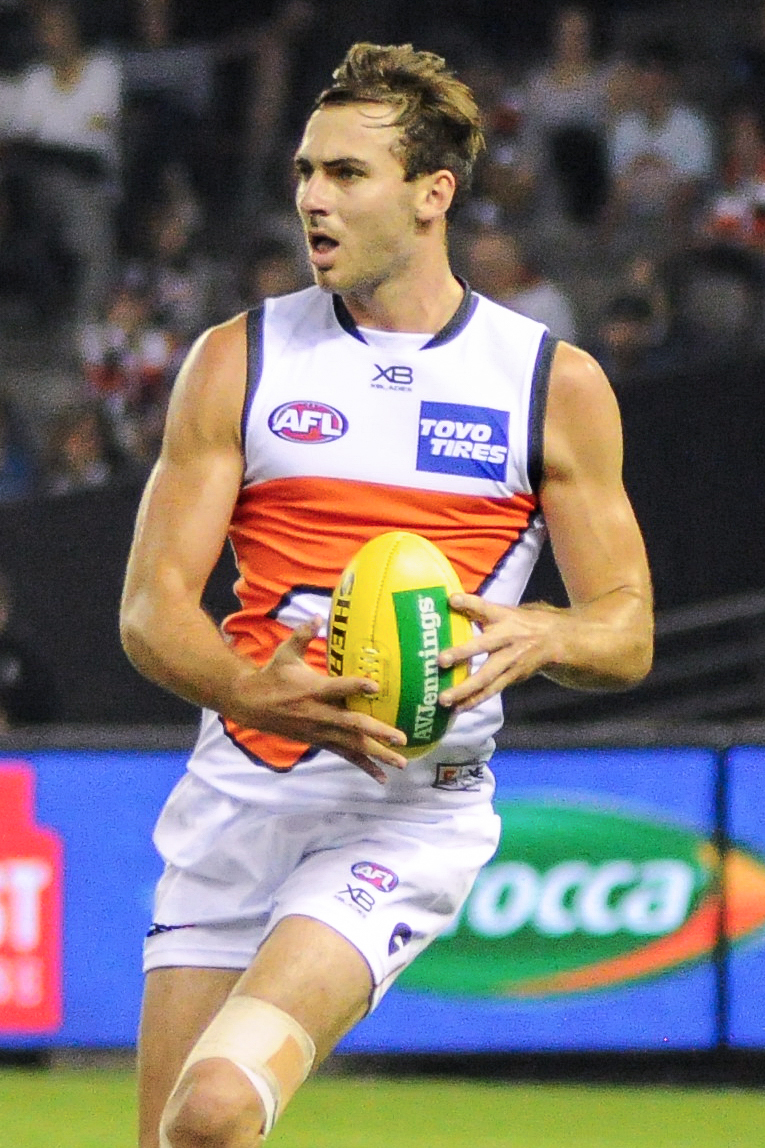
Jeremy Finlayson is from Culcairn

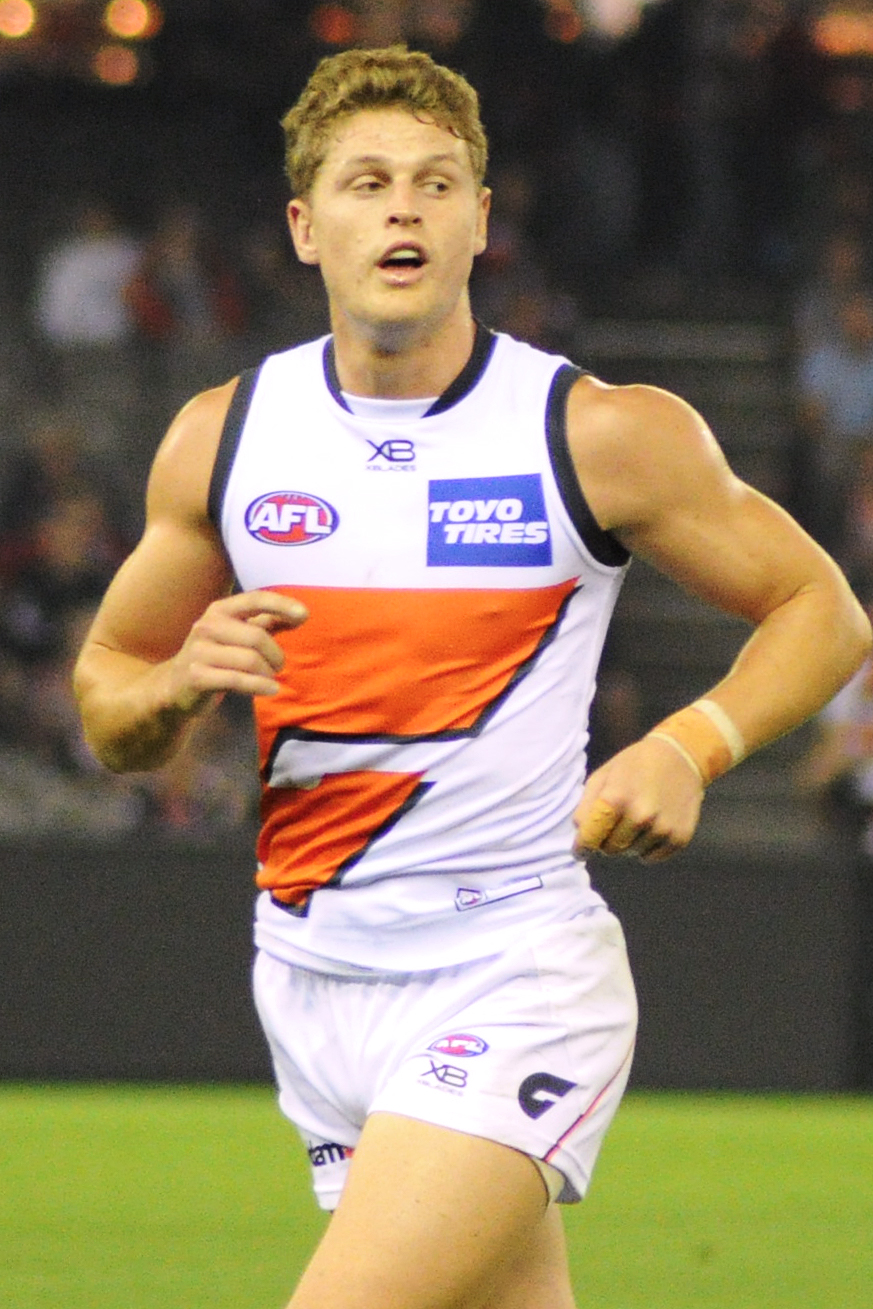
Jacob Hopper is from Leeton

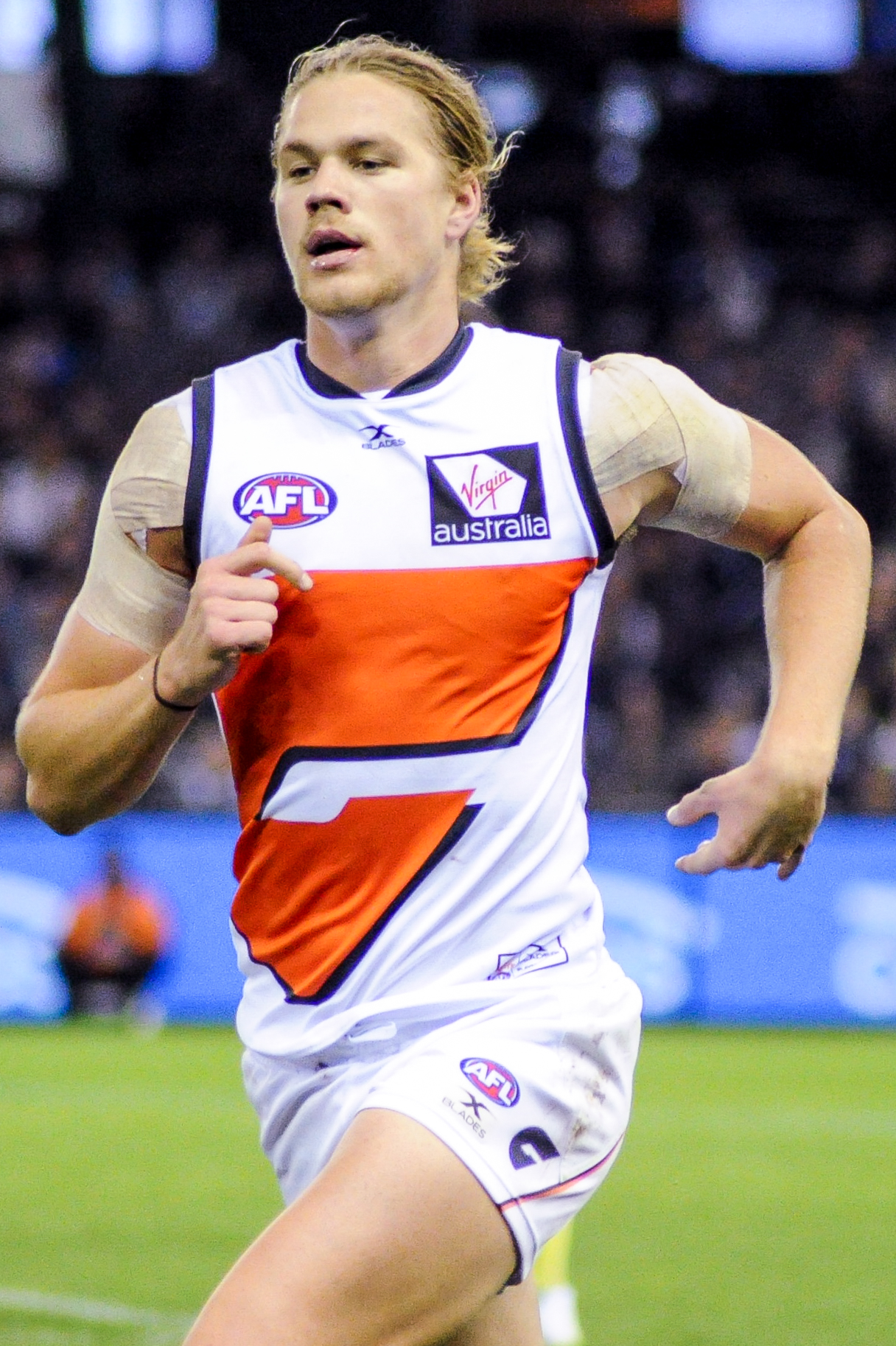
Harrison Himmelberg is from Wagga Wagga

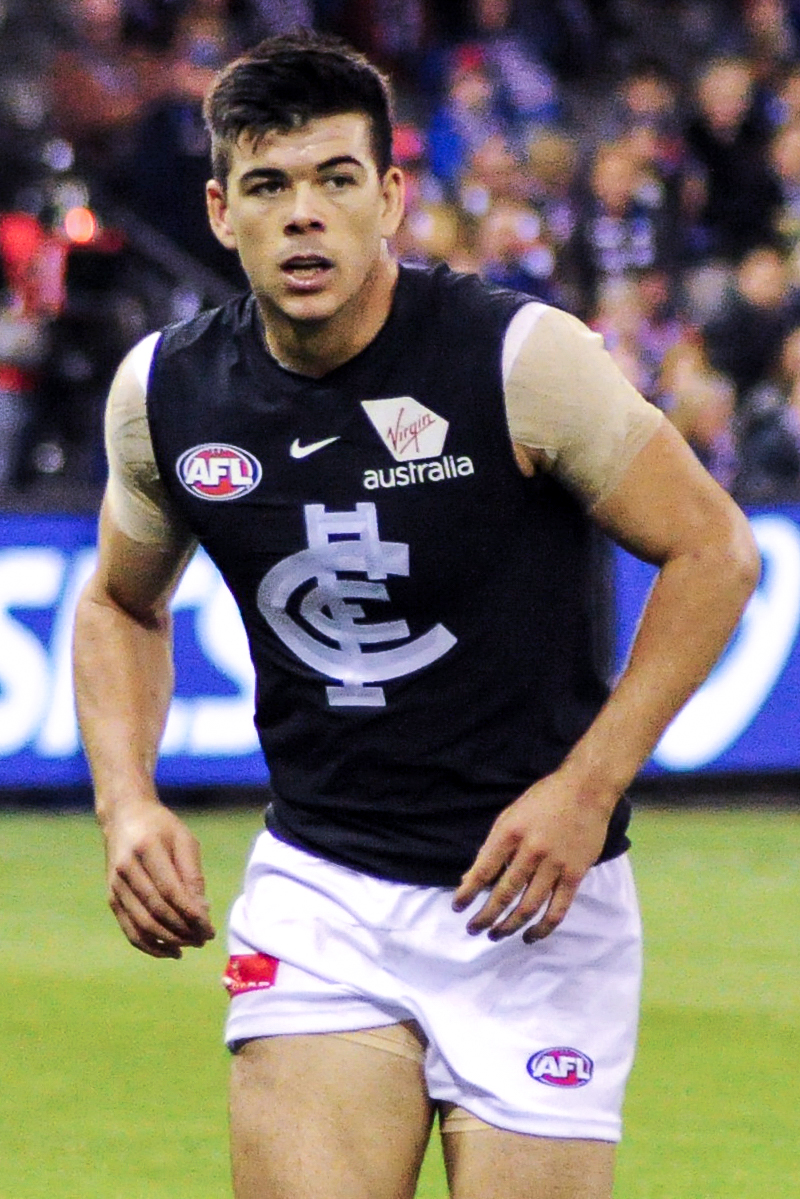
Matthew Kennedy is from Collingullie

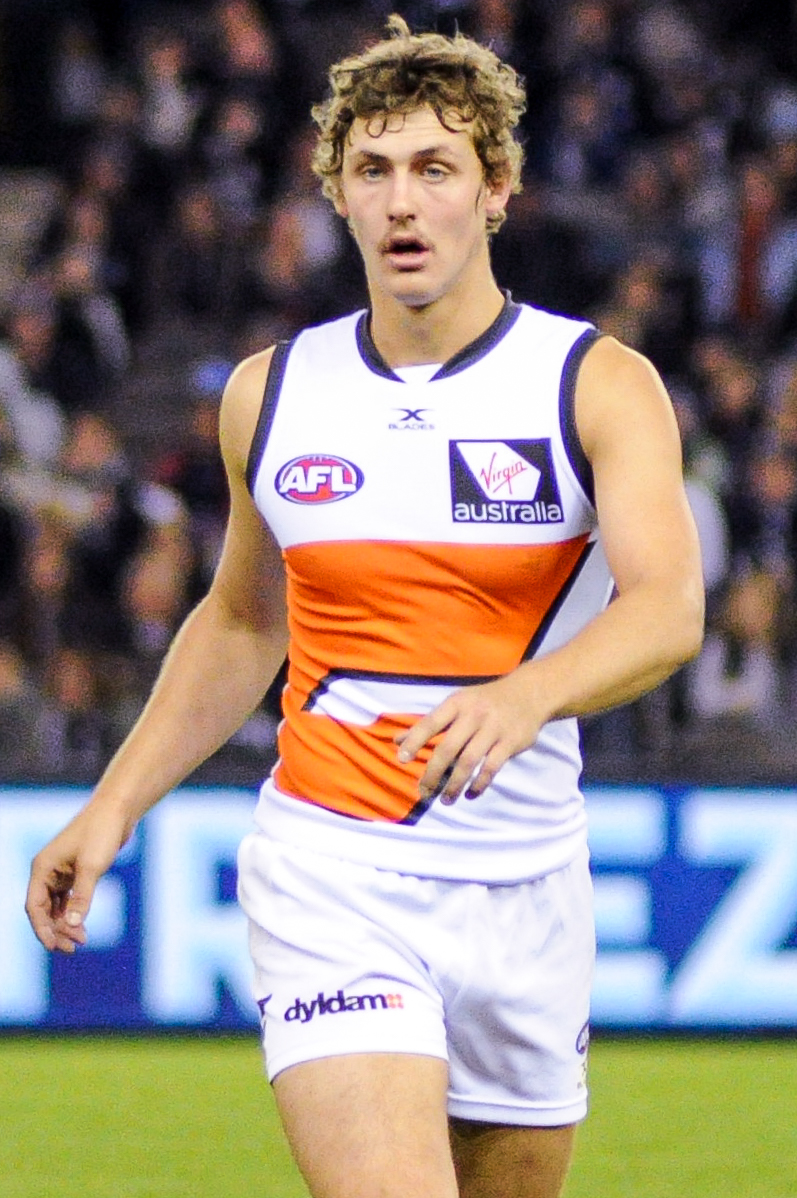
Harry Perryman is from Collingullie

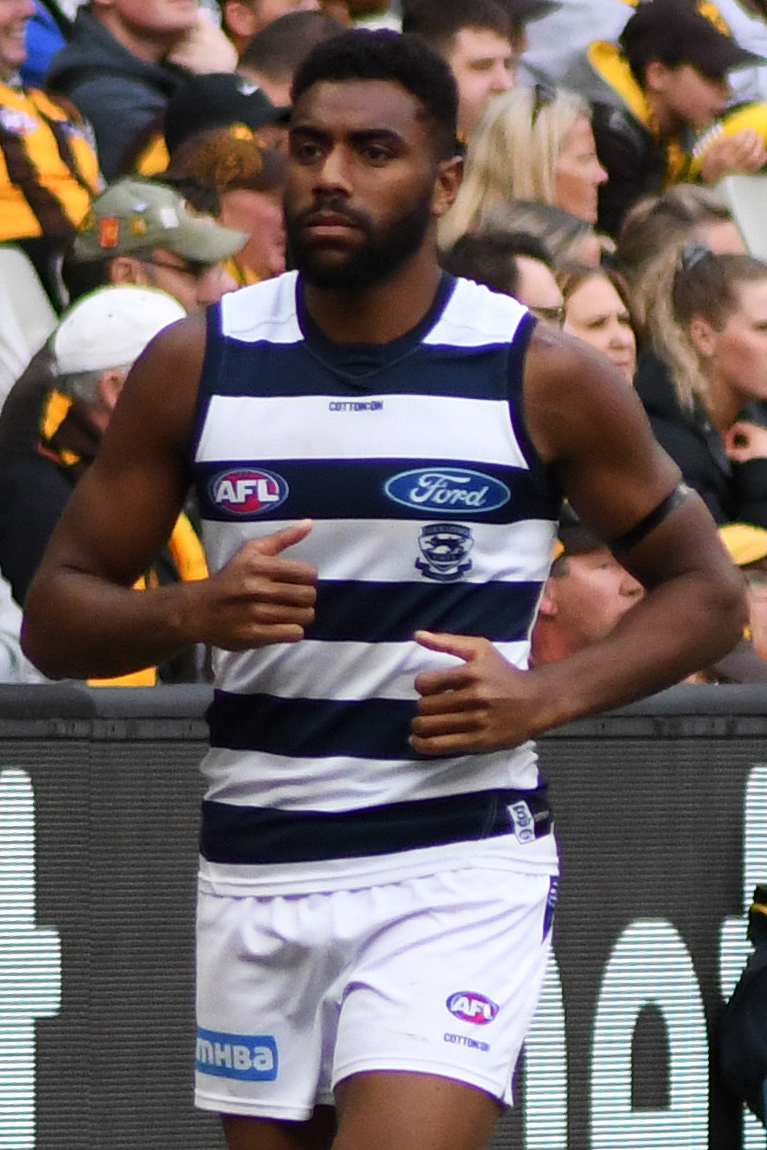
Esava Ratugolea is from Griffith

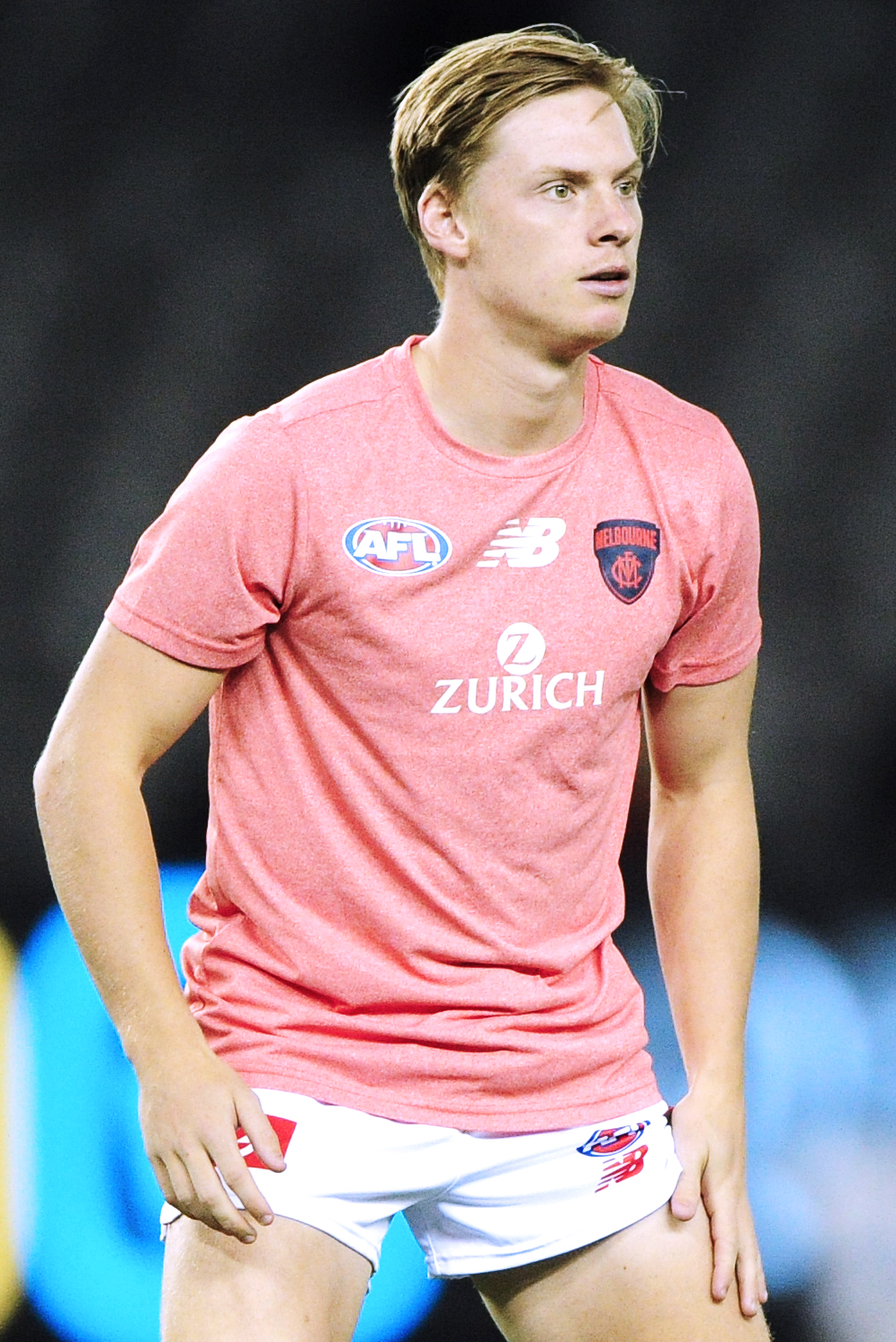
Charlie Spargo is from Albury

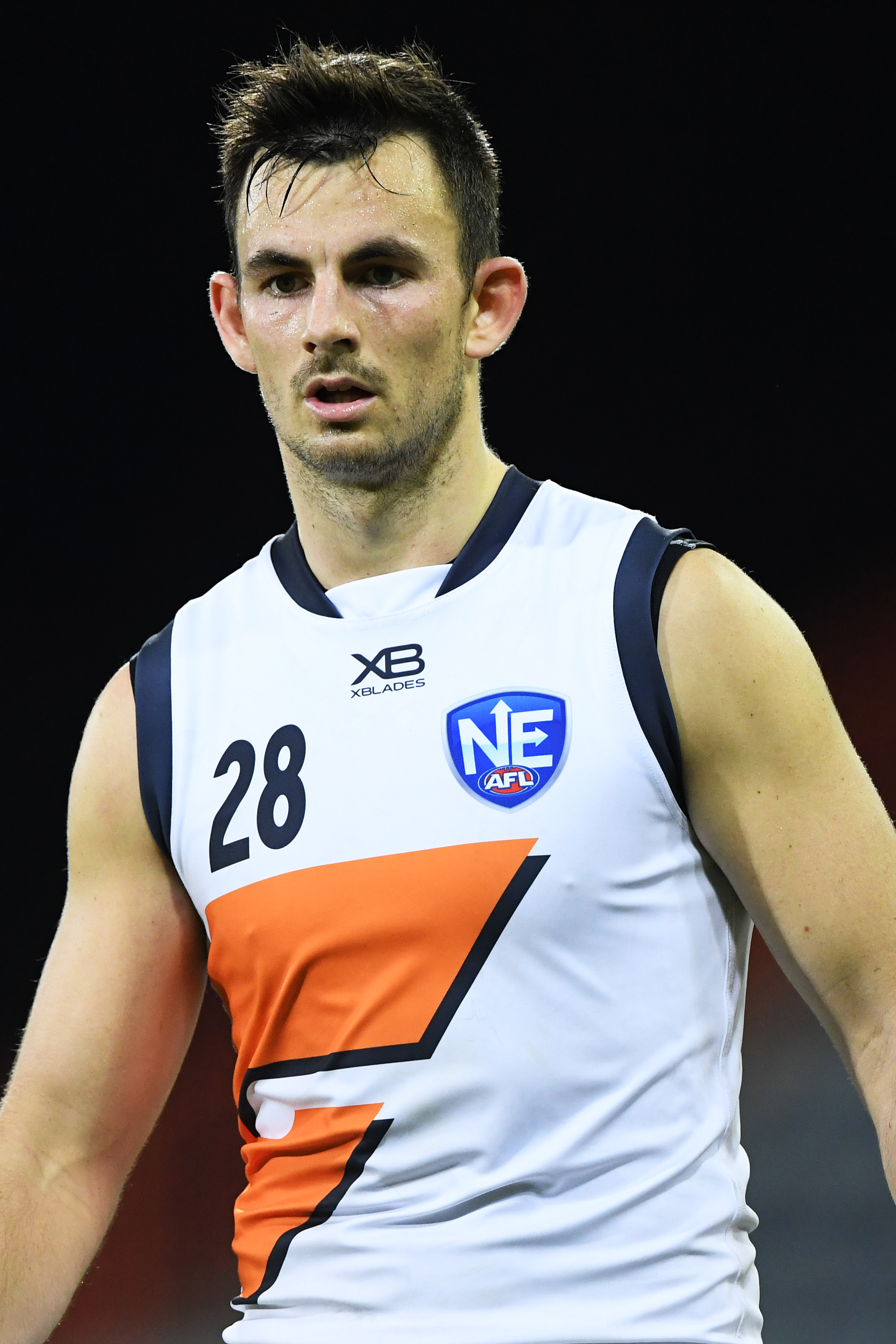
Zach Sproule is from Albury

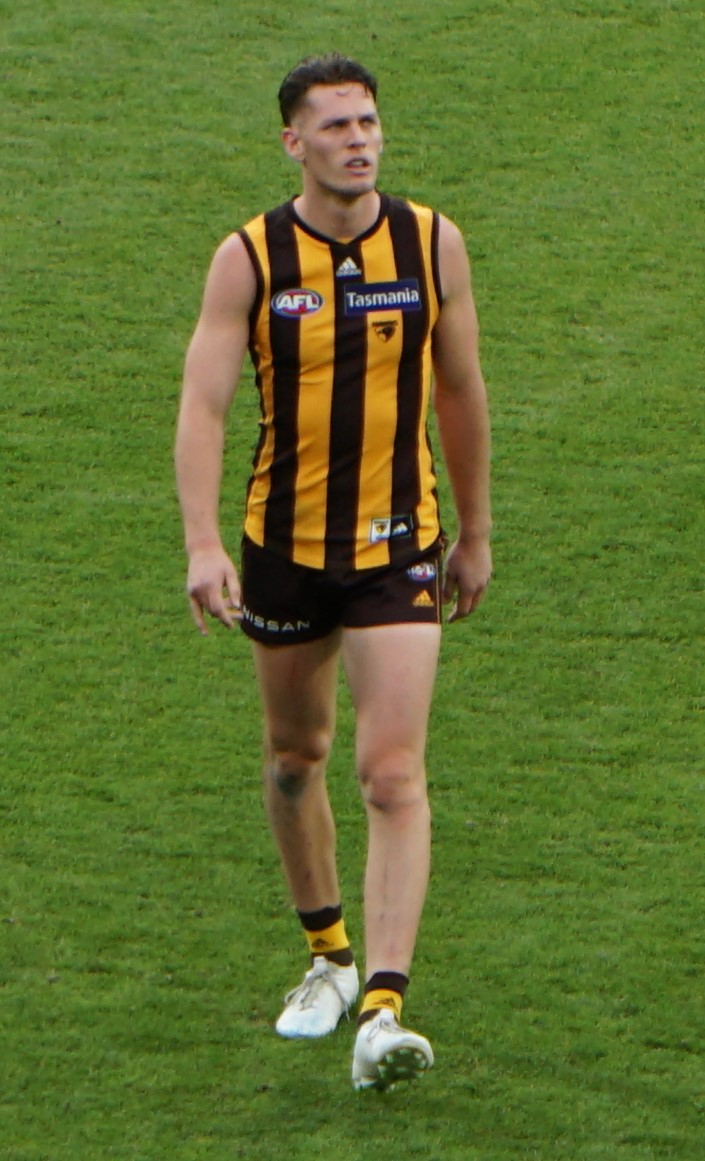
Jacob Koschitzke is from Albury

== See also ==
- Australian rules football in New South Wales
