= Walla Walla =

Walla Walla can refer to:

- Walla Walla people, a Native American tribe
  - Walla Walla County, Washington, a county named after the Walla Walla people
  - Walla Walla, Washington, a city named after the Walla Walla people
- Place of many rocks in the Australian Aboriginal Wiradjuri language, the origin of the name of the town of Walla Walla in New South Wales

== Places and jurisdictions ==
=== United States ===
- Walla Walla River, the river along which the Walla Walla tribe lived
- the former Roman Catholic Diocese of Walla Walla, whose territory is currently ministered by the Roman Catholic Diocese of Spokane
- Walla Walla Community College
- Washington State Penitentiary, also called "Walla Walla State Penitentiary"
- Walla Walla University, in College Place, Washington (a Walla Walla suburb)
- Walla Walla Valley AVA, wine region in the Walla Walla Valley
- Fort Walla Walla, also known as Fort Nez Percés
- Walla Walla Regional Airport
- The Confederated Tribes of the Umatilla Indian Reservation, which includes the Walla Walla reservation
- Walla Walla, Illinois

=== Australia ===
- Walla Walla, New South Wales, a town

== Other uses ==
- Walla Walla Council, creating the Treaty of Walla Walla
- MV Walla Walla, a Jumbo class ferry in the Washington State Ferry System
- Walla Walla Football Club, located in New South Wales, Australia
- Walla Walla, a Jamaican term meaning to "roll around" in something (mud, dirt, etc.)
- Walla-walla, a kind of motorboat used in Hong Kong
- Walla Walla Sweets, baseball team in Walla Walla, Washington
- "Walla Walla", a song on The Offspring's album Americana
- "Walla Walla", a song on Glass Animals' album Zaba

== See also ==
- Walla (disambiguation)
- Wala (disambiguation)
- Wallah
- Wallowa
