= Wala =

Wala may refer to:

== Places ==
- Wala (island), a small island in Vanuatu, and a popular destination for cruise ships
- Wala, Panama, a community in Kuna de Wargandí, Panama
- Kingdom of Wala, a pre-colonial polity in the north of modern Ghana
- Waalo, an empire in West Africa between the 13th and 19th Centuries

== People ==
- Wala of Corbie (755–836), an advisor to the Frankish kings including Charlemagne
- Sidhu Moose Wala (1993–2022), Indian singer, rapper, actor and politician
- Shefali Jari Wala (1982–2025), Indian actress
- Wala, an Indian name

== Language and ethnic groups ==
- Wala people, an ethnic group in Ghana
- Wala language (disambiguation), several languages
- Wallah or Wala, a suffix in several Indo-Aryan languages

== Other ==
- Wala (goddess), a sun goddess in Australian aboriginal spirituality
- Weighted Average Loan Age, a term relating to mortgage-backed securities
- WALA-TV, a FOX television station in southern United States
- Walo (rodent), a variety of gerbil from Somalia

== See also ==
- Vala (disambiguation)
- Walla (disambiguation)
- Walla Walla (disambiguation)
- Wallah
