= Valla (surname) =

Valla is a surname. It is Italian equivalent of Valle. It is also used as a surname in Norway referring to someone from several places or farmsteads in Nordland. It is the plural form of Old Norse word vǫllr (Norwegian: field meadow). Notable people with the surname include:

- Esat Valla, Kosovar Albanian painter
- Gerd-Liv Valla, Norwegian trade union leader
- Giorgio Valla (1447–1500), scientist
- Kristin Valla (born 1975), Norwegian writer and journalist
- Kristin Hille Valla, Norwegian politician for the Centre Party
- Lorenzo Valla (1406–1457), Italian Renaissance era humanist
- Marie-Laure Valla, French set dresser and set decorator
- Natacha Valla, French economist
- Paul Vallas, American politician
- Spyros Vallas, Greek professional football player
- Trebisonda Valla (1916–2006), Italian athlete

== See also ==
- Valla (disambiguation)
