= Walla (disambiguation) =

Walla is a sound effect imitating the murmur of a crowd in the background.

Walla may also refer to:

- Walla! Communications, Israeli internet company
- August Walla (born 1936), Austrian art brut artist
- Chris Walla (born 1975), American musician
- Walla Brook, three streams on Dartmoor, England

== See also ==
- Walla Walla (disambiguation)
- Wallah, a suffix in Indic languages
- Wala (disambiguation)
- Valla (disambiguation)
