= Chaiwala =

Person who makes, sells or serves tea/chai for living

Chaiwala (Tea-seller)
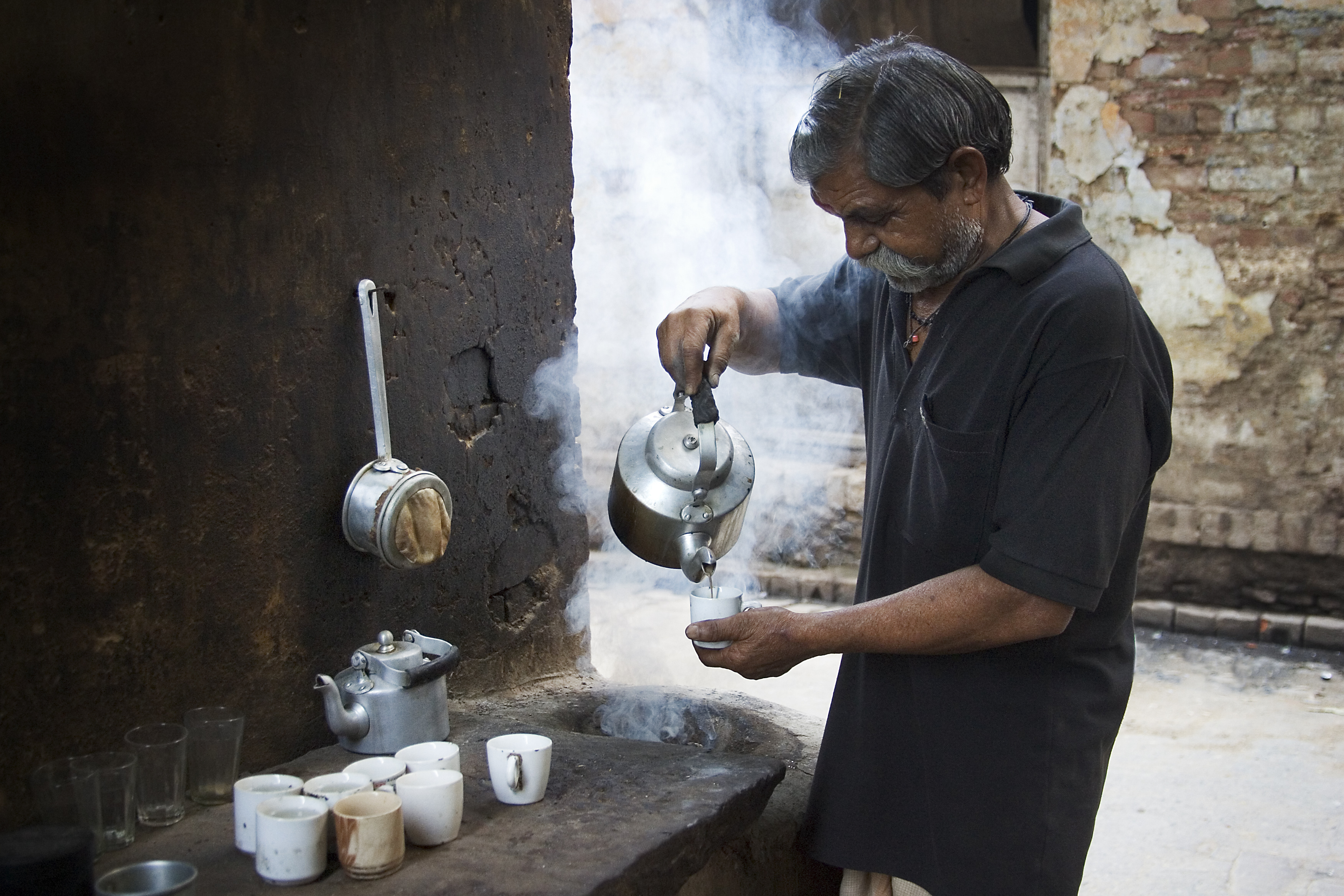
- A chaiwala in Varanasi pouring a cup of chai

Occupation
- Occupation type: Profession
- Activity sectors: Public

Description
- Education required: No

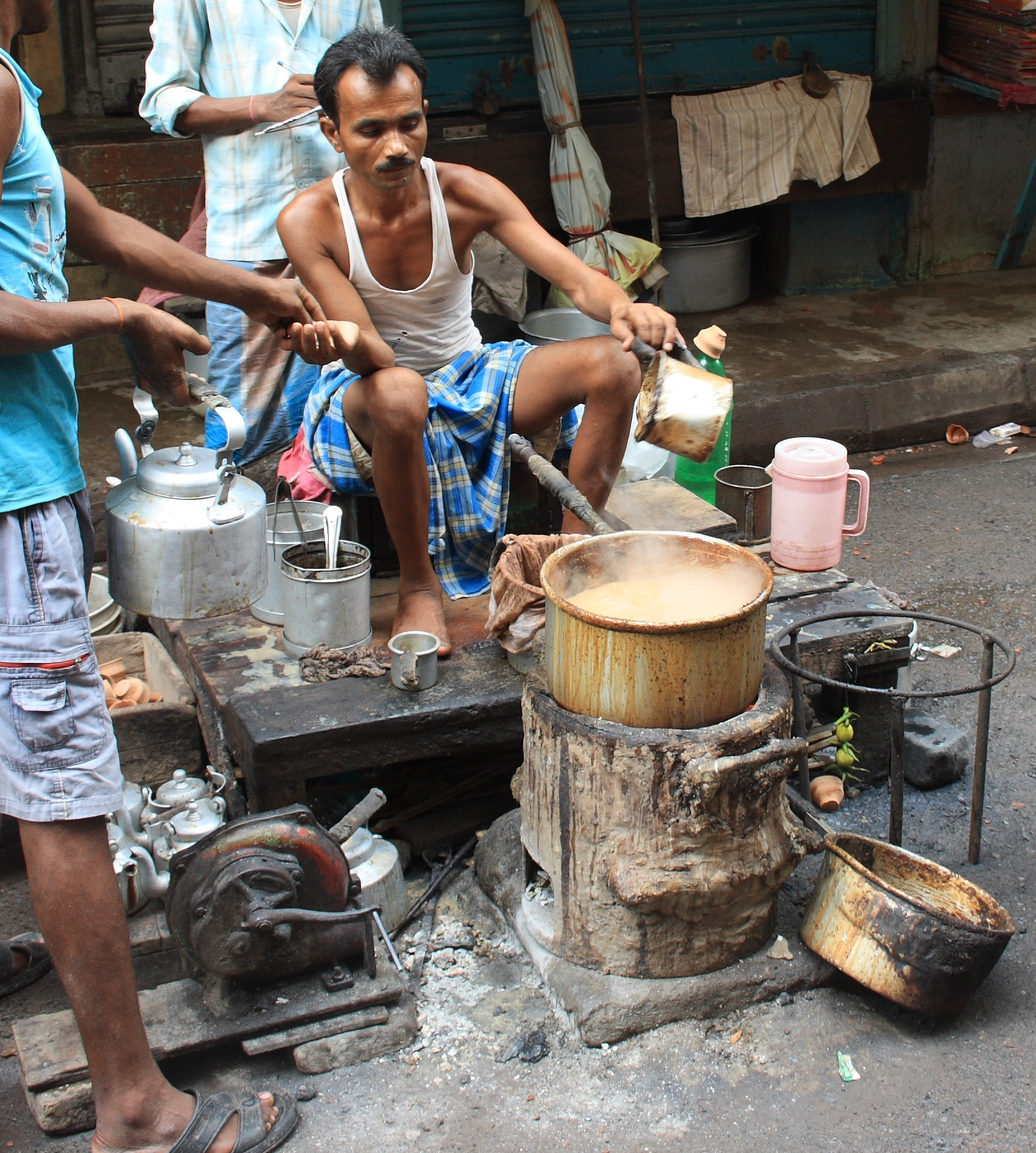
A chaiwala prepares masala chai on a coal fire in a street of Kolkata.

A chaiwala (also transliterated as chaiwalah or chaiwallah; Urdu: چائےوالا, Hindi: चायवाला) is a tea-seller in the Indian subcontinent. They are an integral part of subcontinent culture. Chai is the Hindi and Urdu word for "tea", as in masala chai, and wala indicates the person performing the task, so chaiwala is a street vendor of tea.

Chaiwalas, as an entrepreneurial group, tend to move from different regions of India to run their small business in major cities. They typically prepare the tea by boiling a mixture of water and milk, often with a spice mixture called chai masala, then add tea leaves and sugar, and finally strain the drink into containers or a tea kettle. Tea is usually served in small glasses or unglazed clay teacups (kulhar), but some chaiwala have started to use plastic cups instead. Traditionally, tea was made in brass vessels.

== In popular culture ==
In the 1955 film Shri 420, the hero (portrayed by Raj Kapoor) takes the heroine (portrayed by Nargis) to a roadside tea stall. The chaiwala insists on receiving a payment of two annas (anna is 1/16th of a rupee) for the two cups. This scene serves as a prelude for the famous song "Pyar Hua Ikrar Hua", during which the chaiwala is shown sipping the tea from a saucer. In the 2008 film Slumdog Millionaire, the lead character, Jamal Malik (played by Dev Patel), is a chaiwala in an Indian call center.

In the UK TV sitcom It Ain’t Half Hot Mum, Dino Shafeek plays the chai wallah Muhammad. Muhammad walks around the camp all day, selling tea from his urn. He also sings the musical interruptions between the scenes, which are mostly American hit songs, accompanied by a sitar. At the end of the credits, he starts to sing "Land of Hope and Glory" only to be interrupted by the Sergeant Major shouting "SHUT UP!!!". After Rangi leaves, he takes on the role of Bearer to the concert party, as well as still being the Chai Wallah.

== Notable examples ==
The press has noted several successful chaiwalas. They include:

- Former Chief Minister of Bihar and Rashtriya Janata Dal, Chief Lalu Prasad Yadav stated that he was once a chaiwala.
- Laxman Rao of Delhi, author of 24 books.
- Current Prime Minister Narendra Modi has said the he was a chaiwala in his youth.

== See also ==
- Street Vendors (Protection of Livelihood and Regulation of Street Vending) Bill, 2012
- Tea lady, a similar occupation in Britain
