= Walo =

Walo may refer to:

- Walo (rodent)
- Waalo, an empire of Senegal and Mauritania between the 13th and 19th centuries
- WALO, a radio station of Puerto Rico, US
- Walo language, spoken in Mali
- Prix Walo, an award in Swiss show business

== People with the name ==
- Walo Hörning (1910–1986), Swiss fencer
- Walo Lüönd (1927–2012), Swiss movie actor

== See also ==
- Wala (disambiguation)
