= Laxmanrao =

Laxmanrao is a name. People with the name include:

== Given name ==
- Laxmanrao Kirloskar
- Laxmanrao Mankar
- Laxmanrao Pandurang Patil
- Laxmanrao Sardesai

== Middle name ==
- Shantanu Laxmanrao Kirloskar
- Balachandra Laxmanrao Jarakiholi
- Sudhir Laxmanrao Parwe
- Ashok Laxmanrao Kukade
- Madhavrao Laxmanrao Apte
- Uttamrao Laxmanrao Patil

== Surname ==
- Jarkiholi Ramesh Laxmanrao

== See also ==
- Laxman Rao
