= Valla =

Valla is both a surname and place name which may refer to:

- Valla (surname)

== Places ==
- Valla (Dhaalu Atoll), an uninhabited island of the Maldives
- Valla (Pieria), a town of ancient Pieria, Macedonia, Greece
- Valla, Norway in Vega Municipality in Nordland county, Norway
- Vallsjøen (Valla) in Meløy Municipality in Nordland county, Norway
- Valla, New South Wales, a village in New South Wales, Australia
- Valla, Sweden, locality situated in Katrineholm Municipality, Södermanland County, Sweden
- Valla, locality in Linköping Municipality, Östergötland County, Sweden
  - East Valla
  - West Valla
  - Valla Wood, nature reserve in the municipality of Linköping
- Stora Valla, multi-use stadium in Degerfors, Sweden

== Other ==
- Plural for Vallum, the whole or a portion of the fortifications of a Roman camp
- Valla, a player character in the video game Heroes of the Storm

== See also ==
- Valle (disambiguation)
- Walla (disambiguation)
- Thiruvalla, a city in Kerala, India
