= Valle (surname) =

Valle is a surname. Notable people with the surname include:

- Ågot Valle (born 1945), Norwegian politician
- Alex Valle (born 1978), Peruvian-American professional fighting game player
- Amaurys Valle (born 1990), Cuban track-and-field athlete
- Ángela Valle (1927–2003), Honduran writer, journalist, essayist
- Anna Valle (born 1975), Italian actress
- Beatriz Valle (born 1966), Honduran politician
- Camila Valle (born 1995), Peruvian rower
- Dave Valle (born 1960), American baseball player
- Donald Valle, American restaurateur
- Eltjon Valle (born 1984), artist from Kuçova, Albania
- Héctor Valle (born 1940), Puerto Rican baseball player
- Joaquín Valle (1916–1980), Spanish professional footballer
- Jonatan Valle (born 1984), Spanish professional footballer
- José Cecilio del Valle (1780–1834), philosopher, politician, lawyer, and journalist
- Marcos Valle (born 1943), Brazilian singer, songwriter and record producer
- Ramón Valle (born 1964), Cuban jazz pianist and composer
- Richard Valle (1931–1995), American restaurateur
- Rosana Valle (born 1969), Brazilian politician
- Sebastián Valle (born 1990), Mexican professional baseball player

== See also ==
- Valla (surname)
- Valle (disambiguation)
- Valli (disambiguation)
- del Valle (surname)

Media related to Valle (surname) at Wikimedia Commons
