= Wallowa =

Wallowa may refer to:

== Places ==
- Wallowa, Oregon
- Wallowa County, Oregon
- Wallowa Lake
- Wallowa Lake State Park
- Wallowa Mountains
- Wallowa River

== Other ==
- Acacia calamifolia, a shrub or tree
- Acacia euthycarpa, a shrub or tree
- The Wallowa, the original name of the tugboat Arthur Foss
- The Wallowa band of the Nez Perce

== See also ==
- Walla Walla
- Walloway, South Australia
