= Sam Rowe =

Australian rules footballer

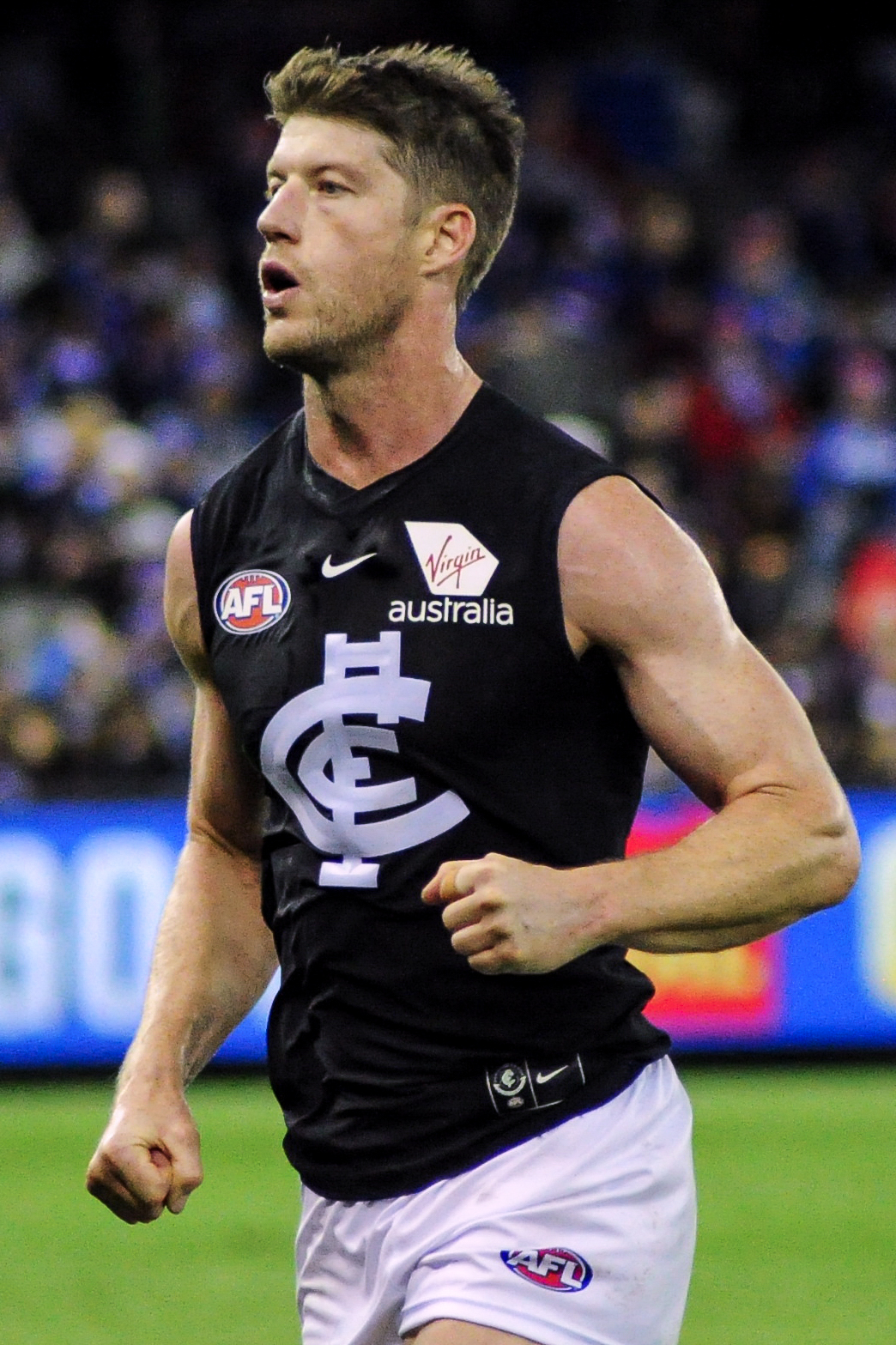
- Rowe playing for Carlton in April 2018

Personal information
- Born: 19 November 1987 (age 38); Wodonga, Victoria
- Original teams: Walla Walla (Hume Football League); Murray Bushrangers (TAC Cup)
- Draft: No. 44, 2011 National Draft, Carlton
- Height: 198 cm (6 ft 6 in)
- Weight: 94 kg (207 lb)
- Position: Defender

Playing career^{1}
Years	Club	Games (Goals)
2012–2018	Carlton	99 (17)
2019	St Kilda	1 (0)
Total		100 (17)
- ^{1} Playing statistics correct to the end of 2019.

Sam Rowe (born 19 November 1987) is a former Australian rules footballer who played for the Carlton Football Club and St Kilda Football Club in the Australian Football League (AFL).

== Career ==
Originally from Walla Walla in the New South Wales Riverina, Rowe played his junior football for the Walla Walla Football Club in the Hume Football League, before playing TAC Cup football for the Murray Bushrangers in northern Victoria in 2005. A tall (198 cm) and solidly built player, Rowe played his junior career predominantly as a ruckman and key forward.

Rowe was recruited as a rookie by the Sydney Swans with its eighth round selection in the 2006 Rookie Draft (No. 60 overall). He spent two seasons on the rookie list with Sydney, but failed to gain AFL selection, and was delisted at the end of 2007. He later commented that, as an eighteen-year-old, he wasn't well prepared for his first attempt at AFL football.

In 2008, Rowe moved to Adelaide, and joined the Norwood Football Club in the SANFL. Rowe played four seasons with Norwood, playing 86 senior games and kicking 112 goals for the club. At the same time, Rowe completed an apprenticeship in carpentry.

Rowe was recruited back to the AFL by the Carlton Football Club in the 2011 AFL National Draft with its second round selection (No. 44 overall). Carlton had approached Rowe the previous year with the view to recruiting him as a rookie, but Rowe rejected that offer to complete the final year of his apprenticeship. He was given guernsey number 17.

Early in the 2012 season, Rowe was diagnosed with testicular cancer. He had an operation to remove the lump in late April, and underwent chemotherapy in May and June. He made his return to training in October 2012, and he made his AFL debut at age 25 against Collingwood in Round 2, 2013.

After being selected irregularly as a forward during 2013, Rowe had a breakout season in 2014 when he earned a regular place in the Carlton team as a permanent tall defender – a position he had never previously played. His performances were strong enough for him to finish fifth in the best and fairest, and was elevated to the five-man leadership group in the 2015 season, and was a key member of the Carlton backline over the following years. He earned another top-ten performance in the club's best and fairest with a sixth place in 2016.

Rowe suffered a torn anterior cruciate ligament in Round 9, 2017, and missed the remainder of the 2017 season.

At the conclusion of the 2018 season, he was delisted by Carlton.

In March 2019, Rowe was signed by St Kilda as a pre-season supplemental selection. Rowe played his 100th and final AFL game (as well as his only game for St Kilda) in round 23, 2019.
