= Kristin Valla =

Norwegian writer

Kristin Valla (born 22 March 1975 in Mo i Rana) is a Norwegian writer and journalist. She now lives in Oslo. Her debut novel, Muskat, has been translated to several languages, including English in 2002.

== Life and work ==
Kristin Valla was born and brought up in Mo i Rana outside Finneidfjord in Nordland. She is a trained journalist from the University of Oslo and has studied French and Spanish at the University of Oslo and the University of Bergen. She has also studied Latin American studies at the University of Bergen. In the autumn of 1997, she moved to Venezuela, where she lived for over a year and, among other things, studied Spanish grammar and essay writing in Mérida.

Valla has worked as a journalist in Dagbladet Magasinet, as editor-in-chief in the fashion magazine Costume and as editor for the cultural magazine Aftenposten K.

In 2000, she made her debut as an author with the novel Muskat (Nutmeg) which turned out to be very successful. The novel has been translated into several languages, including English, German and Japanese. Kristin's third novel Ut av det blå (Out of the Blue) was published in 2019. In the same year, it was nominated for the Bokhandlerprisen (Norwegian Booksellers' Prize). In 2022 it was published in Germany as Das Haus über dem Fjord. In 2023 was published Egne steder - om skrivende kvinner, lidenskap og et lite hus på den franske landsbygda. In 2025 it was published in Germany as Ein Raum zum Schreiben.

== Bibliography ==
- Muskat (Nutmeg) (2000)
- Turister (Tourists) (2003)
- Verdens fineste: 55 romantiske reisemål (The world's finest: 55 romantic destinations) (2004)
- Skuddene i Tbilisi (The shots at Tbilisi) (2006)
- Ut av det blå (Out of the Blue) (2019)
- Egne steder - om skrivende kvinner, lidenskap og et lite hus på den franske landsbygda (2023)
