= Central Hume Football Association =

The Central Hume Football Association was an Australian Rules Football competition that was first established in 1928 after a meeting comprising the following clubs: Bowna, Burrumbuttock, Gerogery, Jindera and Walbundrie and was based at Jindera in the Riverina area, New South Wales.

== History ==
The Central Hume Football Association was an Australian Rules Football competition that was first established in 1928 after a meeting comprising the following clubs: Bowna, Burrumbuttock, Gerogery, Jindera and Walbundrie.

In 1933, Gerogery, Jindera and Lavington broke away and joined the newly formed Hume Football League, with Gerogery having immediate success, claiming four consecutive Hume Football League premierships from 1933 to 1936.

Bulgandra FC played in the Central Hume FA in 1933 and 1934, which was a small settlement near where gold was discovered at the Walbundrie Reefs in the 1850s.

G Chisnall, Walla Walla FC won the league best and fairest award, the Loftus Medal in 1933.

In 1935, Burrumbuttock, Walbundrie and Walla Walla joined the Hume Football League, while Brocklesby joined the Albury & District Football League and Rand joined the Coreen & District Football League.

The Central Hume FA held a meeting in March, 1935, with three clubs - Bulgandra, Rand and Walbundrie keen to play, but it appears the competition did not reform at the scheduled May, 1935 meeting after a number of former club's joined the Hume Football League during the presiding two years.

All up there were eleven club's that played in the Central Hume FA during its short, seven year history.

Hume Football Association - 1922 to 1926.

There was an original Hume Football Association that was formed in 1922 and ran from 1922 to 1926 during its short history.

- Premiers / Runners Up
  - 1922 - Bulgandra: 8.12 - 60 defeated Walla Walla: 6.4 - 40. Other teams were - Brocklesby, Burrumbuttock and Walbundrie.
  - 1923 - Burrumbuttock: 6.8 - 38 d Brocklesby: 6.5 - 35. Other teams were - Bulgandra, Walbundrie and Walla Walla. Brocklesby & Walla Walla joined the Riverina Football Association in 1924.
  - 1924 - Bulgandra d Burrumbuttock. Other teams were - Walbundrie and Walla Walla Sub Division (Ramblers). The Walla Walla Subdivision FC joined the Riverina Football Association in 1925. Burrumbuttock joined the Albury B. Grade Football Association in 1925.
  - 1925 - The Hume FA had an AGM in March, 1925 with three club's, Bulgandra, Rand and Walbundrie interested in playing, but it appears the Hume FA went into recess in 1925.
  - 1926 - Rand: 10.3 - 64 d Bulgandra: 4.6 - 30. Other teams were - Burrumbuttock and Walbundrie. Burrumbuttock joined the Albury & Border FA & Rand joined the Osborne FA in 1927, while Bulgandra and Walbundrie were forced to go into recess for 1927, as Walbundrie were refused entry into the Albury & Border FA. Bulgandra and Walbundrie then joined the Central Hume FA in 1928.

== Clubs ==
=== Final ===
Club	Colours	Nickname	Home Ground	Former league	Est.	Years in CHFA	CHFA Senior Premierships		Fate
Club	Colours	Nickname	Home Ground	Former league	Est.	Years in CHFA	Total	Years	Fate
Brocklesby		Kangaroos	Brocklesby Recreation Reserve, Brocklesby	A&DFL	1907	1933-1934	0	-	Moved to Albury & District FL in 1935
Bulgandra			Bulgandra Recreation Reserve, Rand	HFA	1912	1933-1934	0	-	Folded after 1934 season
Burrumbuttock		Swans	Burrumbuttock Recreation Reserve, Burrumbuttock	A&BFL	1911	1928-1934	2	1928, 1932	Moved to Hume FL in 1935
Rand		Pigeons	Rand Recreation Reserve, Rand	C&DFA	1925	1932-1934	2	1933, 1934	Moved to Coreen & District FL in 1935
Walbundrie		Tigers	Walbundrie Showground, Walbundrie	HFA	1906	1928-1934	0	-	Moved to Hume FL in 1935
Walla Walla		Hoppers	Walla Walla Sportsground, Walla Walla	RFA	1903	1930-1934	1	1931	Moved to Hume FL in 1935

=== Former ===
Club	Colours	Nickname	Home Ground	Former league	Est.	Years in CHFA	CHFA Senior Premierships		Fate
Club	Colours	Nickname	Home Ground	Former league	Est.	Years in CHFA	Total	Years	Fate
Bowna				A&BFA	1922	1928	0	-	Folded after 1928 season
Gerogery		Magpies	Gerogery Recreation Ground, Gerogery	A&BFA	1903	1928-1932	1	1930	Moved to Hume FL in 1933
Jindera		Bulldogs	Jindera Sports Ground, Jindera	A&BFA	1900	1928-1932	1	1929	Moved to Hume FL in 1933
Lavington		Saints	Urana Road Oval, Lavington	A&BFA	1918	1929-1932	0	-	Moved to Hume FL in 1933
Mullengandra				–	1929	1929-1931	0	-	Folded after 1931 season

== Central Hume FA: Premiers / Runners Up ==
- 1928 - Burrumbuttock: 9.11 - 65 d Jindera: 5.15 - 45. Played at Jindera.
- 1929 - Jindera: 11.5 - 71 d Gerogery: 8.5 - 53
- 1930 - Gerogery: 6.8 - 44 d Jindera: 3.9 - 27
- 1931 - Walla Walla: 16.12 - 108 d Burrumbuttock: 13.12 - 90. Played at Jindera.
- 1932 - Burrumbuttock d Rand. Played at Walla Walla.
- 1933 - Rand: 10.9 - 69 d Burrumbuttock: 8.8 - 56. Played at Walbundrie.
- 1934 - Rand: 5.13 - 43 d Bulgandra: 5.8 - 38. Played at Walbundrie.

== League Best & Fairest Award ==
Richard Loftus Medal (Walbundrie Hotel)

- 1933 - George Chisnall, Walla Walla
- 1934 - Gus Bedgood, Walbundrie, 21 votes

== Central Hume FA: Office Bearers ==
Year	President	Secretary	Treasurer
1928	George Nation	W Cross	W Cross
1929	George Nation	W Cross	W Cross
1930	George Nation	W Cross	W Cross
1931	George Nation	W Cross	W Cross
1932	George Nation	W Hay	W Hay
1933	George Nation	W Hay	W Hay
1934	George Nation	E W Head	
1935		C J Boutcher	

== Links ==
- Hume FNL website
- Riverina Football Association
