= Riverina Football Association =

Australian rules football competition

The Riverina Football Association was an Australian rules football competition formed in 1924 from the following clubs - Balldale, Brocklesby Culcairn, Henty Town, Henty Rovers, Holbrook and Walla Walla.

== History ==
The Riverina Football Association was an Australian Rules Football competition formed in 1924 from the following clubs - Balldale, Brocklesby Culcairn, Henty Town, Henty Rovers, Holbrook and Walla Walla that was active for only six football seasons, up until 1929.

Interestingly, there was a Riverina Main Line Football Association that was formed in 1922 and based in Wagga Wagga. The seven club's that made up this competition were - Culcairn, Henty, Mangoplah, Wagga Federals, Wagga Newtown, Wagga Stars and Yerong Creek. This competition was only in existence for one season, with the Wagga Stars defeating Yerong Creek in the Grand Final. On the eve of the final series Culcairn, Henty, and Mangoplah withdrew from the competition, citing the fact the association refused to provide a VFL umpire for the final series.

In 1923 Mangoplah applied to re-enter the Wagga United Football Association, but the other clubs voted against them. Mangoplah then joined the Yerong Creek & District Football Association and won the minor premiership but lost their semifinal match to Culcairn. Mangoplah, as the minor premiers, exercised their right to challenge the "final" winners. Mangoplah played Culcairn in the Grand Final at Yerong Creek and won the YC&DFA premiership.

Brocklesby's golden era was certainly in the 1920s, when the club played in nine consecutive grand finals between 1923 and 1931, but only won two premierships during this successful period in 1924 and 1928, both in the Riverina Football Association.

In 1927, Culcairn secured the services of Carlton VFL player, Bill Koop as their captain-coach.

== Clubs ==
=== Final ===
Club	Jumper	Nickname	Home Ground	Former League	Est.	Years in RFA	RFA Senior Premierships		Fate
Club	Jumper	Nickname	Home Ground	Former League	Est.	Years in RFA	Total	Years	Fate
Balldale		Blue & Golds	Balldale Cricket Ground, Balldale	C&DFA	1906	1924-1929	0	-	Moved to Corowa & District FA in 1930
Brocklesby		Kangaroos	Brocklesby Recreation Reserve, Brocklesby	HFA	1907	1924-1929	2	1924, 1928	Moved to Corowa & District FA in 1930
Culcairn		Lions	Culcairn Sportsground, Culcairn	YC&DFA	1895	1924-1929	0	-	Moved to Albury & District FL in 1930
Henty		Swans, Swampies	Henty Showground, Henty	YC&DFA	1895	1925-1929	1	1927	Moved to Albury & District FL in 1930
Holbrook		Brookers	Holbrook Sports Complex, Holbrook	A&BFA	1882	1924-1929	3	1925, 1926, 1929	Moved to Albury & District FL in 1930
Walla Walla		Hoppers	Walla Walla Sportsground, Walla Walla	HFA	1903	1924-1929	0	-	Moved to Central Hume FA in 1930

=== Former ===
Club	Jumper	Nickname	Home Ground	Former League	Est.	Years in RFA	RFA Senior Premierships		Fate
Club	Jumper	Nickname	Home Ground	Former League	Est.	Years in RFA	Total	Years	Fate
Henty Imperials			Henty Showground, Henty	–	1924	1924	0	-	Merged with Henty Rovers to form Henty following 1924 season
Henty Rovers			Henty Showground, Henty	–	1924	1924	0	-	Merged with Henty Imperials to form Henty following 1924 season
Walla Ramblers			Walla Walla Sportsground, Walla Walla	HFA	1924	1925	0	-	Folded after 1925 season
Yerong Creek			Yerong Creek Sports Ground, Yerong Creek	WFA	c.1910s	1925	0	-	Moved to The Rock & District FA in 1926

Teams in Association per year

- 1924: 7 - Balldale, Brocklesby, Culcairn, Henty Imperials, Henty Rovers, Holbrook, Walla Walla.
- 1925: 8 - Balldale, Brocklesby, Culcairn, Henty, Holbrook, Walla Walla, Walla Ramblers, Yerong Creek.
- 1926: 6 - Balldale, Brocklesby, Culcairn, Henty, Holbrook, Walla Walla.
- 1927: 6 - Balldale, Brocklesby, Culcairn, Henty, Holbrook, Walla Walla.
- 1928: 6 - Balldale, Brocklesby, Culcairn, Henty, Holbrook, Walla Walla.
- 1929: 6 - Balldale, Brocklesby, Culcairn, Henty, Holbrook, Walla Walla.

== Football Grand Finals ==
Year	Premiers	Score	Runners up	Score	Venue	Gate	Umpire	Premiership Cup
1924	Brocklesby	7.13 - 55	Balldale	7.7 - 49	Brocklesby	£40	Green	Don Davis Cup.
1925	Holbrook	9.5 - 59	Brocklesby	7.7 - 49	Holbrook			Tooth Cup.
1926	Holbrook	12.10 - 82	Brocklesby	11.12 - 78	Culcairn	£71	Harrod	Tooth Cup.
1927	Henty	9.15 - 69	Brocklesby	5.16 - 46	Balldale	£40		Tooth Cup.
1928	Brocklesby	9.14 - 68	Culcairn	10.5 - 65	Walla Walla	£60	Joyce	Tooth Cup.
1929	Holbrook	13.9 - 87	Brocklesby	11.18 - 84	Culcairn		O'Hea	Tooth Cup.

- Don Davis from the Brocklesby Hotel, donated the premiership cup in 1924.
- Tooth & Co Brewing Ltd donated a premiership cup in 1925.

== Officer Bearers ==
Year	President	Secretary	Treasurer
1924	A J Andrews		
1925	A J Andrews		
1926	A J Andrews	M A R Wills	L C Coulter
1927	A J Andrews	D W Murray	L C Coulter
1928	F W Alldis	D W Murray	L C Coulter
1929	J H Balfour	D W Murray	L C Coulter

== See also ==
- Albury & District Football League
- Central Hume Football Association
- Central Riverina Football League
- Coreen & District Football League
- Farrer Football League
- Hume Football Netball League
- South West Football League (New South Wales)
