= Wala language =

Wala may be:

- Langalanga language of the Solomon Islands
- Uripiv language of Vanuatu
- Dagaari Dioula language of Burkina Faso
