= Walla Walla Football Club =

Walla Walla FNC

Names
- Full name: Walla Walla Football & Netball Club
- Nickname: Hoppers

Club details
- Founded: 1903; 123 years ago
- Dissolved: 2016
- Colours
- Competition: Hume Football League
- Premierships: (19) 1919, 1920, 1921, 1931, 1939, 1940, 1948, 1953, 1959, 1965, 1966, 1970, 1973, 1974, 1976, 1980, 1981, 1983, 1987.
- Ground: Walla Walla Recreation Reserve

The Walla Walla Football Club was an Australian rules football club based in Walla Walla that played in the Hume Football League in southern New South Wales. The club's nickname is the Hoppers (short for grasshopper), the guernsey design consisted of green and white stripes on the front with an all green rear. Their home ground was the Walla Walla Sportsground in Walla Walla.

In 2016, they merged with the Rand-Walbundrie Football Club to form the Rand Walbundrie Walla Giants.

== History ==
The club was originally formed in 1903 and played ad hoc matches against other clubs in the district. However it did not participate in regular competition until 1910, when it began to compete in various associations against other local clubs.

In 1917–18 the club went into recess due to World War I, before resuming in 1919. It joined the Hume Football League in 1935, where it fielded teams (aside from a recess due to World War II) through to 2015.

During the 2015/16 off season the Walla Walla and Rand-Walbundrie football clubs entered merger talks for the 2016 Hume Football League season. The Walla Walla Hoppers members voted 100 per cent in favour of the merger; while The Rand-Walbundrie Tigers voted 83 per cent in favour of the merger

Walla Walla Football Association

The Walla Walla Football Association was formed in 1915 from the following clubs: Burrumbuttock, Gerogery, Jindera and Walla Walla. This competition ran from 1915 to 1916, then went into recess in 1917 and 1918, due to World War One, then re-formed from 1919 to 1921.

In 1922, there was a move to form a line association, but it fell through. Then former Walla Walla FA clubs – Brocklesby, Burrumbuttock and Walbundrie and Walla Walla joined the new Hume Football Association in 1922.

Walla Walla played in six consecutive grand finals from 1914 to 1921 (excluding 1917 and 1918), winning three premierships.

- Walla Walla FA – Grand Finals
  - 1914 – Bulgandra: 5.4 (34) defeated Walla: 4.8 (32) – Walbundrie Football Association
  - 1915 – Burrumbuttock: 5.5 (35) defeated Walla Walla: 4.7 (31). Played at Walla Walla.
  - 1916 – Jindera defeated Walla Walla. Played at Burrumbuttock.
  - 1917 & 1918 – In recess due to WW1.
  - 1919 – Walla Walla defeated Bulgandra by 10 points. Played at Walbundrie.
  - 1920 – Walla Walla: 8.5 (53) defeated Bulgandra: 4.5 (29). Played at Walbundrie.
  - 1921 – Walla Walla defeated Burrumbuttock. Played at Brocklesby.

== Competitions ==
- 1910–1913: Culcairn and District Football Association
- 1914: Walbundrie & District Football Association
- 1915–1921: Walla Walla District Football Association
- 1922–1923: Hume Football Association.
- 1924–1929: Riverina Football Association
- 1930–1934: Central Hume Football Association
- 1935–2015: Hume Football League

Merged Clubs

- 2016–2022: Hume Football League "T.B.D." – Joint Venture Club with the Rand-Walbundrie Tigers.

== Football Premierships ==
Seniors

- Walla Walla Football Association
  - 1919, 1920, 1921
- Hume Football Association:
  - Nil. Runners Up – 1922 Grand Final – Bulgandra: 8.12 (60) defeated Walla Walla: 6.4 (40).
- Central Hume Football Association:
  - 1931: Walla Walla: 16.12 (108) defeated Burrumbuttock: 13.12 (90). Played at Jindera.
- Hume Football League:
  - 1939: Walla Walla: 10.8 (68) d Lavington: 4.7 (31) Played at Burrumbuttock.
  - 1940: Walla Walla: 15.19 (109) d Walbundrie: 6.7 (43) Played at Jindera.
  - 1948: Walla Walla: 13.20 (98) d Rand: 8.10 (58) Played at Brocklesby.
  - 1953: Walla Walla: 13.10 (88) d Brocklesby: 4.6 (30) Played at Burrumbuttock.
  - 1959: Walla Walla: 18.20 (128) d Walbundrie: 14.9 (93)
  - 1965: Walla Walla: d Jindera:
  - 1966: Walla Walla: d Walbundrie
  - 1970: Walla Walla: 13.12 (90) d Walbundrie: 12.17 (89)
  - 1973: Walla Walla: 9.14 (68) d Burrumbuttock: 10.7 (67)
  - 1974: Walla Walla: 16.14 (110) d Jindera: 10.4 (64)
  - 1976: Walla Walla: 12.16 (88) d Brocklesby: 5.11 (41)
  - 1980: Walla Walla: 21.8 (134) d Brocklesby: 12.16 (88)
  - 1981: Walla Walla: 11.14 (80) d Osborne: 8.10 (58)
  - 1983: Walla Walla: 22.11 (143) d Brocklesby: 14.22 (106)
  - 1987: Walla Walla: 12.21 (93) d Jindera: 13.10 (88)

== Links ==
- 1939 – Hume FL semi final. Walla Walla FC team photo
- 1939 – Hume FL Grand Final teams. Lavington FC & Walla Walla FC team photos
- 1946 – Walla Walla FC team photo
- 1947 – Walla Walla FC team photo
- 1950 – Walla Walla FC team photo
- 1951 – Hume Junior FL Premiers. Walla Walla FC Juniors team photo
- 1953 – Walla Walla FC team photo
