= Laxman Rao =

Indian writer and tea-seller (born 1952)

- लक्ष्मण राव
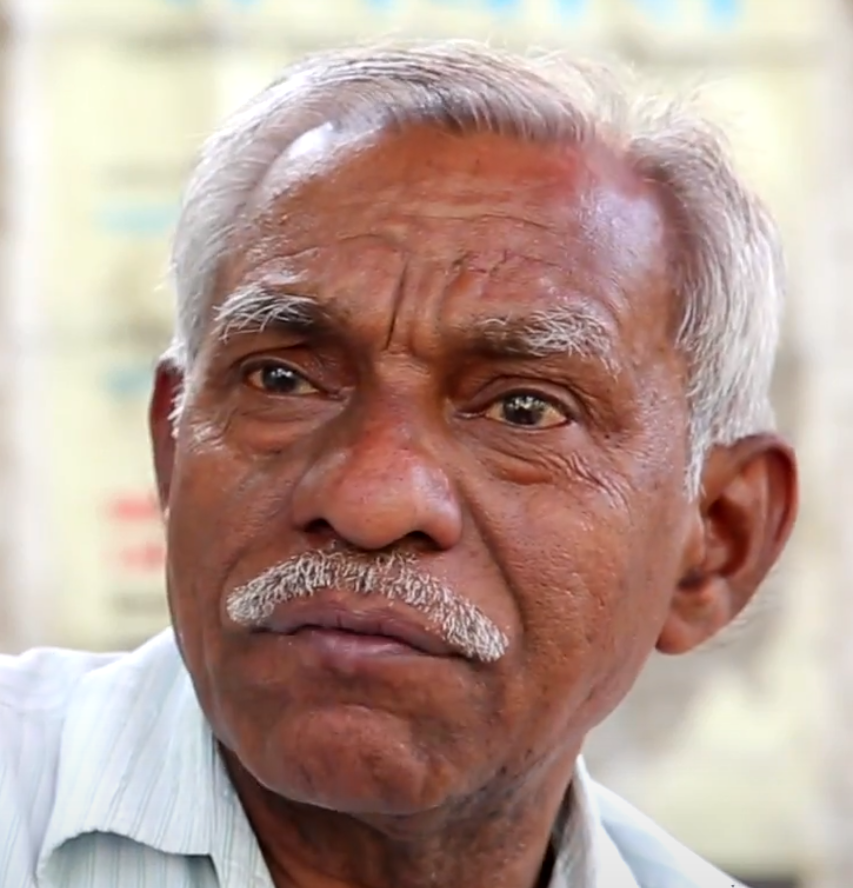
- Rao in 2014
- Born: 22 July 1952 (age 74); Talegaon Dashasar, Amravati, Maharashtra
- Citizenship: India
- Education: Delhi University, Indira Gandhi National Open University
- Occupations: Writer, Tea Seller
- Writing career
- Years active: 1975
- Genre: Novels
- Subject: Various Themes
- Notable awards: Bhartiya Anuvad Parishad

Laxman Rao is an Indian writer and tea-seller. The author of over 24 novels, plays and political essays, Rao, a graduate of Delhi University, is also a sidewalk tea-seller in Delhi. Rao says that his books are based on ideas he gets while interacting with his customers and his writings revolve around their personal struggles. But, unlike Rao who is poor, most of the protagonists in his books are rich and well to do. Reviewers have said that his books "exude a rare sense of honesty and humility" and that his "writings are woven around ground realities of life". Rao is also known in Europe, where articles are written about him, e.g. in Germany.

== Books and Novels ==
Books

- Premchand Ka Vyyaktitva
- The Barrister Gandhi
- Bhartiya Arthshastra
- Pradhanmantri: Indira Gandhi Ke Karyakaal Par Aadharit
- Drishtekonn: Vartamaan Ghatnaon Par Aadharit
- Abhivyaktie: Jwalant Samasyaon Par Aadharit Sahityik Vishleshan
- Adhyapak: Hindi Play
- Mannviki Hindi Sahitya
- Ahannkarr: Satya Ghatnaon Par Aadharit Sahityik Vishleshan
- Betiyoon Ka Astitva: Motivational Book
- Navyuvakon Ka Uttardayitvva: Motivational Book

Novels

- Nai Duniya Ki Nai Kahani (First Novel, 1979)
- Rammdas: Vidyarthi Jeevan Par Aadharit Shikshaprad Upanyas
- Dansh: Samajik Ghatnaon Par Aadharit Prernatmak Upanyas
- Renuu: Mahila Pradhan Prernatmak Upanyas
- Pattiyon Ki Sarsaraahat: Samajik Bandhanon Par Aadharit Maarmik Upanyas
- Narmmada: Prem Prasangon Par Aadharit Maarmik Upanyas
- Love Beyond Social Confines: Romantic Suspense Novel

== Awards and recognition ==
- Bhartiya Anuvad Parishad
