= Wallah =

Indian surname or suffix

Wallah, -walla, -wala, or -vālā (Hindi: वाला; fem. वाली -vālī), is a suffix used in a number of Indo-Aryan languages, like Hindi/Urdu, Gujarati, Bengali or Marathi. Originating from Sanskrit पा॒ल (pālá) + Middle Indo-Aryan -𑀓- (-ka-), it forms an adjectival compound from a noun or an agent noun from a verb. For example; it may indicate a person involved in some kind of activity, where they come from, or what they wear (topiwala), i.e., habitué.

== Example uses ==
Examples of such uses include:

- Dabbawala (डब्बावाला), lunch box deliverer
- Dhobiwallah (धोबीवाला), laundry worker
- Chaiwala (चायवाला), a boy or young man who serves tea

In British military jargon of the first half of the 20th century, a "base wallah" is someone employed at a military base, or with a job far behind the front lines. There were a number of other words of this type, such as "camel wallah" and "machine-gun wallah", and more. "Base wallah" had a derogatory reference for a person who is seldom seen at the front lines during major attacks, pretending to be sick.

There is a short story "Sanjeev and Robotwallah", by Ian McDonald. There is a character named General Robotwallah in the 2010 novel For the Win by Cory Doctorow. "Robotwallah" refers to the pilot of a mecha.
