= Kywong railway line =

Former railway line in New South Wales, Australia

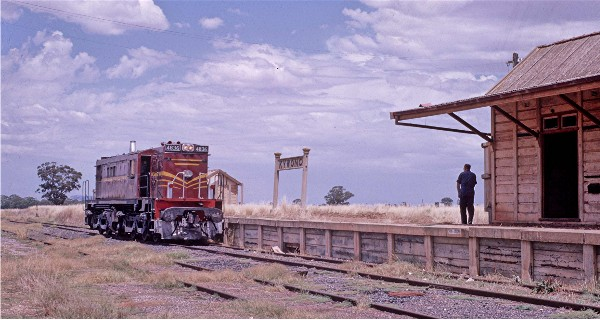
- 4836 shunts past Kywong in February 1970

Overview
- Other name: Kywong Branch
- Status: Closed
- Termini: Uranquinty; Kywong
- Stations: 7

History
- Opened: 30 October 1928
- Closed: 4 May 1975 (services); 1988 (full)

Technical
- Number of tracks: 1
- Track gauge: 1,435 mm (4 ft 8 1/2 in)

The Kywong railway line is a closed branch railway line in New South Wales, Australia, 53 kilometres (33 mi) in length. It branched from the Main South line at Uranquinty to the township of Kywong.

== Construction ==
Representations for the construction of the branch railway were first made in 1919 when a deputation waited upon the Minister for Public Works to urge the building a line from Wagga Wagga to Corobimilla. Exploratory surveys were made and it was decided that the most suitable route lay from Uranquinty to Moons Siding, a point about six kilometres south of Narrandera on the Tocumwal line.

The Railway Commissioners furnished a report on the proposal and the matter was referred for consideration by the Public Works Committee on 22 November 1922. The proposal at that time was for the line to terminate at a location near to present day Galore. Finally, in August, 1923, the Parliamentary Committee on Public Works recommended construction of the line, but construction did not begin until March, 1926. The section between Uranquinty and Galore opened on 30 October 1928. The previous year, on 27 June 1927, The Public Works Committee had agreed to a 4-mile extension of the line to Sandigo, the present day Kywong. The extension was opened to Kywong on 23 March 1929.

== Operations ==
The Down Mixed Train operated on Tuesdays only in 1957, connecting off the southbound Albury Mail, the Up service returning the same day, connecting with the northbound Albury Mail at Uranquinty.

The surrounding countryside is flat, open terrain, with few trees. The track was mainly unfenced, allowing livestock to graze along the track, causing some difficulty for train crews.

== Closure ==
Passenger services ceased operation in 1975, during a period of widespread closure of New South Wales branch-line passenger services, leaving the line at that time as a seasonal wheat line. The line was completely closed in 1988.
