= Greenvale, New South Wales =

Greenvale
- Town
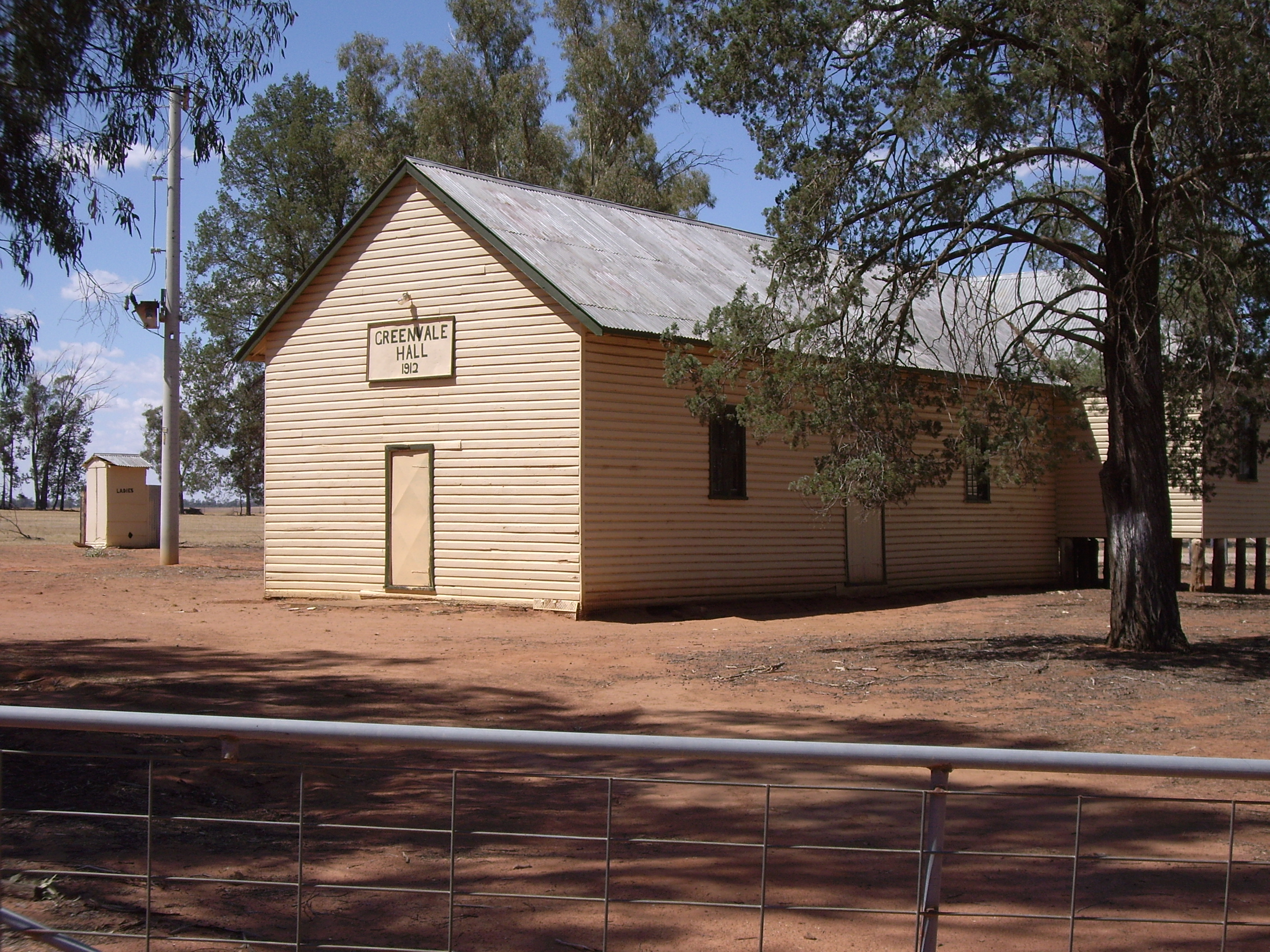
- Greenvale Hall

- Coordinates: 35°02′S 146°32′E
- Country: Australia
- State: New South Wales
- LGA: Federation Council
- Location: 8 km (5.0 mi) from Birrego; 12 km (7.5 mi) from Boree Creek

Government
  - State electorate: Albury
  - Federal division: Farrer
- Elevation: 151 m (495 ft)
- Postcode: 2652
- County: Urana

Greenvale is a rural community in the central east part of the Riverina. It is situated by road, about 8 kilometres south from Birrego and 12 kilometres north west from Boree Creek.

Greenvale Post Office opened on 1 July 1904 and closed in 1920.

The Greenvale Football Club (Green & Gold colours) played in the Faithful & District Football Association from 1920 to 1939. Between 1929 and 1936, the Greenvale FC played in eight consecutive grand finals and all up played in 15 grand finals for eight Faithful & DFA premierships. In 1936, a league best and fairest medal was awarded to Leo Foley from the Greenvale FC, who also kicked eight goals in their grand final victory. The club then joined the Lockhart & District Football League in 1940 and were runners up to Osborne FC. The club did not reform after World War II.
