= Bon Accord railway station =

Former railway station in New South Wales, Australia

Bon Accord

General information
- Location: Bon Accord Road, Uranquinty, New South Wales; Australia
- Coordinates: 35°13′30″S 147°11′49″E
- Operator: Public Transport Commission
- Line: Main Southern line
- Distance: 541.373 km (336.394 mi) from Central
- Platforms: 1 (1 side)
- Tracks: 2

Construction
- Structure type: Ground

History
- Opened: 13 January 1891
- Closed: September 1962

Services
| Preceding station | Former services | Following station |
|---|---|---|
| The Rock towards Albury | Main Southern Line | Uranquinty towards Sydney |
Location

Bon Accord railway station was a railway station on the Main Southern line, serving the locality of Bon Accord in Uranquinty, New South Wales, Australia. The station opened on 13 January 1891 and closed in September 1962. No trace remains of it today.
