= Kywong, New South Wales =

Kywong New South Wales
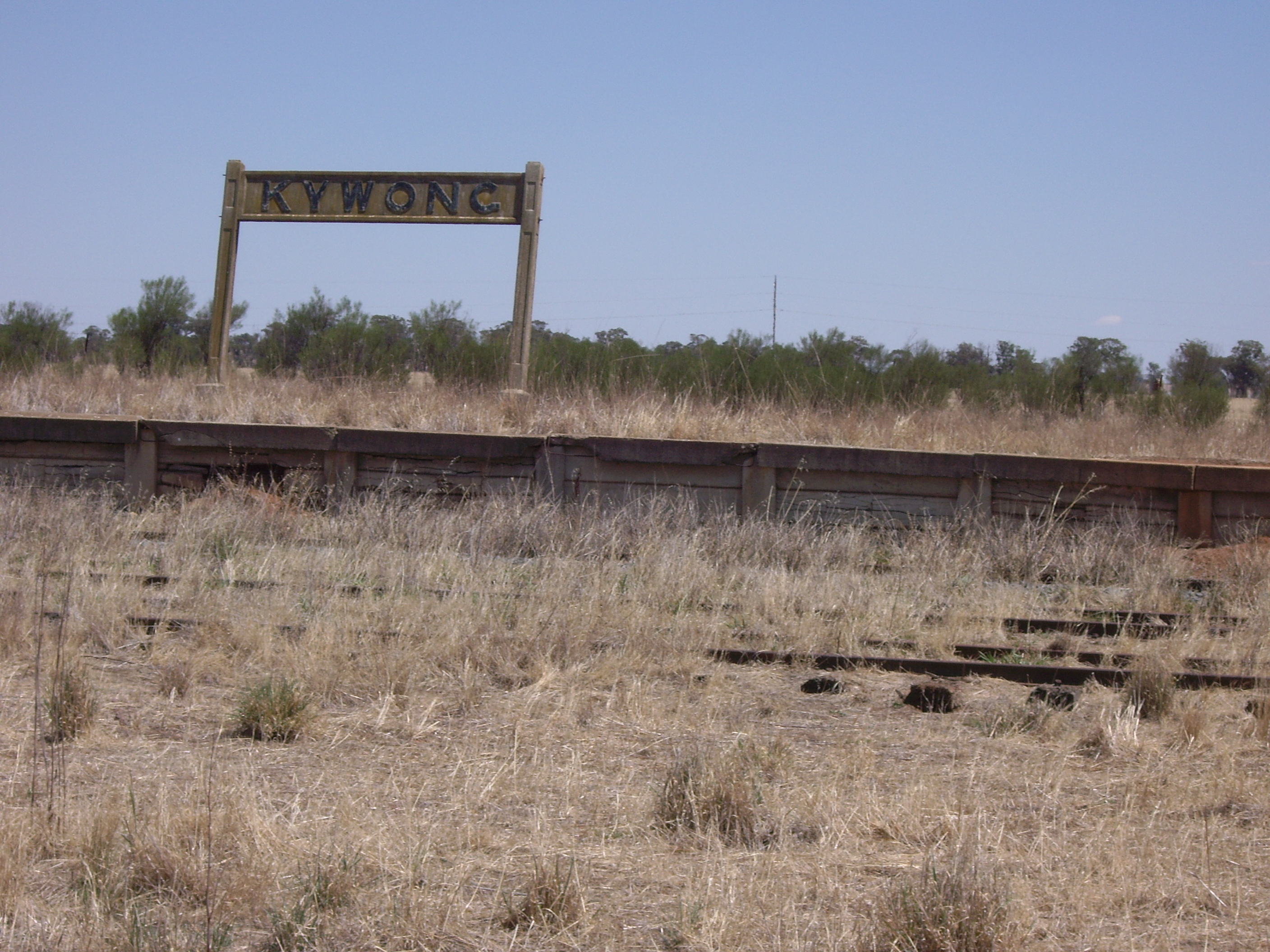
- Kywong Railway Siding – closed 1975

- Coordinates: 34°59′0″S 146°44′0″E
- Postcode(s): 2700
- Location: 520 km (323 mi) from Sydney; 424 km (263 mi) from Melbourne; 64 km (40 mi) from Wagga Wagga; 36 km (22 mi) from Narrandera
- LGA(s): Narrandera Shire
- County: Mitchell
- State electorate(s): Cootamundra
- Federal division(s): Riverina

Kywong is a rural place within the locality of Sandigo in the Riverina region of New South Wales, Australia. It is situated on the Sturt Highway, 520 kilometres south west of the state capital, Sydney and 64 kilometres west of Wagga Wagga.

The Kywong Football Club competed in the Faithful & District Football Association in 1922 & 1923. They then went into recess from 1924 to 1931, then returned to play in the Faithful & DFA from 1932 to 1935. Kywong defeated Greenvale in the 1934 grand final played at Boree Creek, with over 200 people attending a premiership ball at the Sandigo Hall. The club folded after the 1935 season.

Kywong was the terminus of the Kywong railway line, a branch line of the Main Southern railway line, opened in 1929 and closed in 1975. Shortly after, the Government Grain Elevators, later known as the Australian Wheat Board (AWB), constructed silos at Kywong for the storage of grain prior to rail transport to markets.

The Kywong Public School opened in 1940 and closed in 1985.

In 2001, the owners of the Kywong silos, GrainCorp announced their closure.
