= Galore, New South Wales =

Galore
- Town
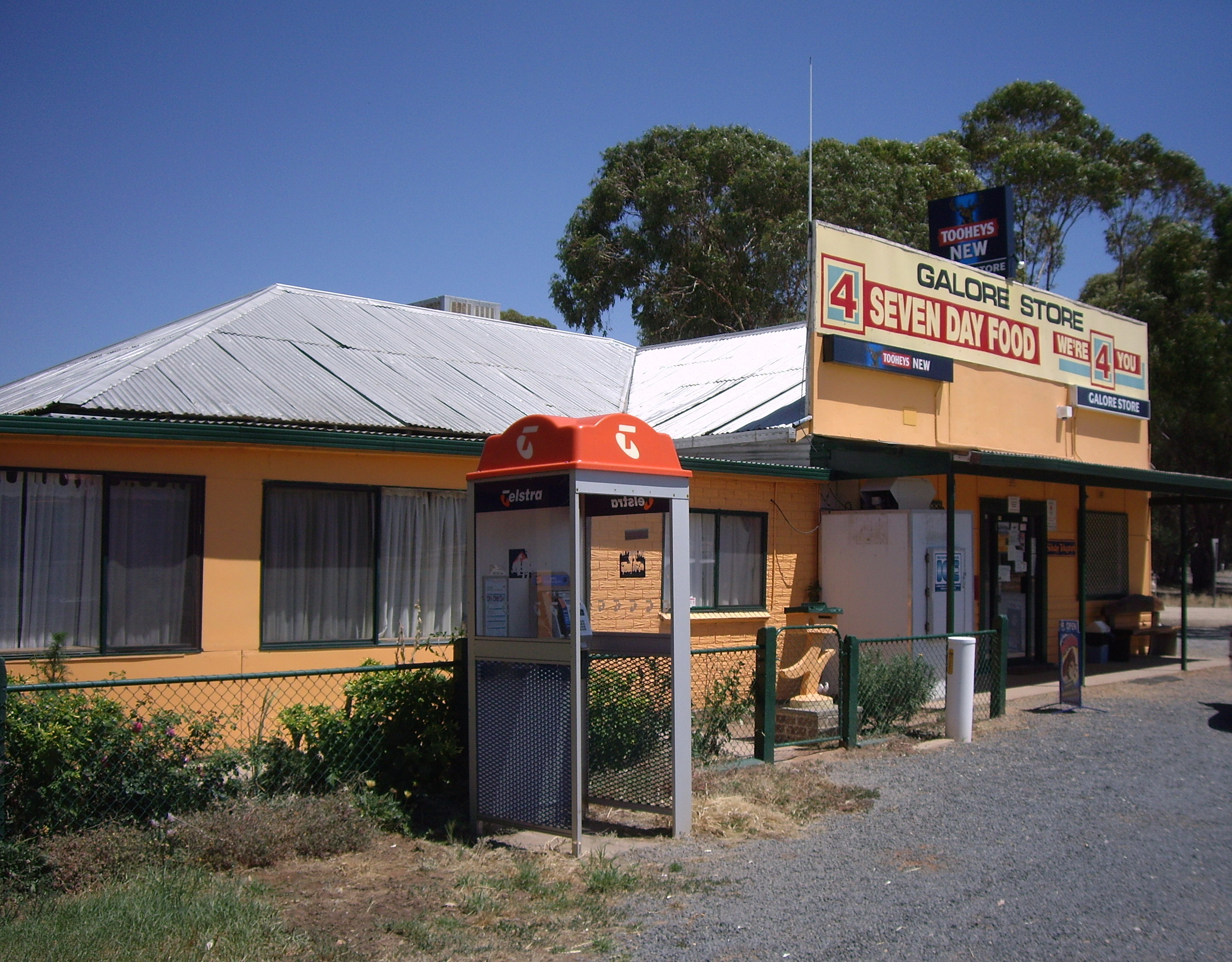
- Galore General Store

- Coordinates: 35°0′22″S 146°53′36″E
- Country: Australia
- State: New South Wales
- LGA: City of Wagga Wagga
- Location: 22 km (14 mi) from Collingullie; 28 km (17 mi) from Sandigo; 56 km (35 mi) from Wagga Wagga; 513 km (319 mi) from Sydney

Government
  - State electorate: Wagga Wagga
  - Federal division: Farrer
- Elevation: 132 m (433 ft)

Population
  - Total: 95 (2016 census)
- Postcode: 2652
- County: Mitchell

Galore is a rural community in the central east part of the Riverina. It is situated by road, about 22 kilometres north west of Collingullie and 28 kilometres south east of Sandigo. At the 2016 census, Galore had a population of 95 people.

Galore Post Office opened on 1 June 1933.

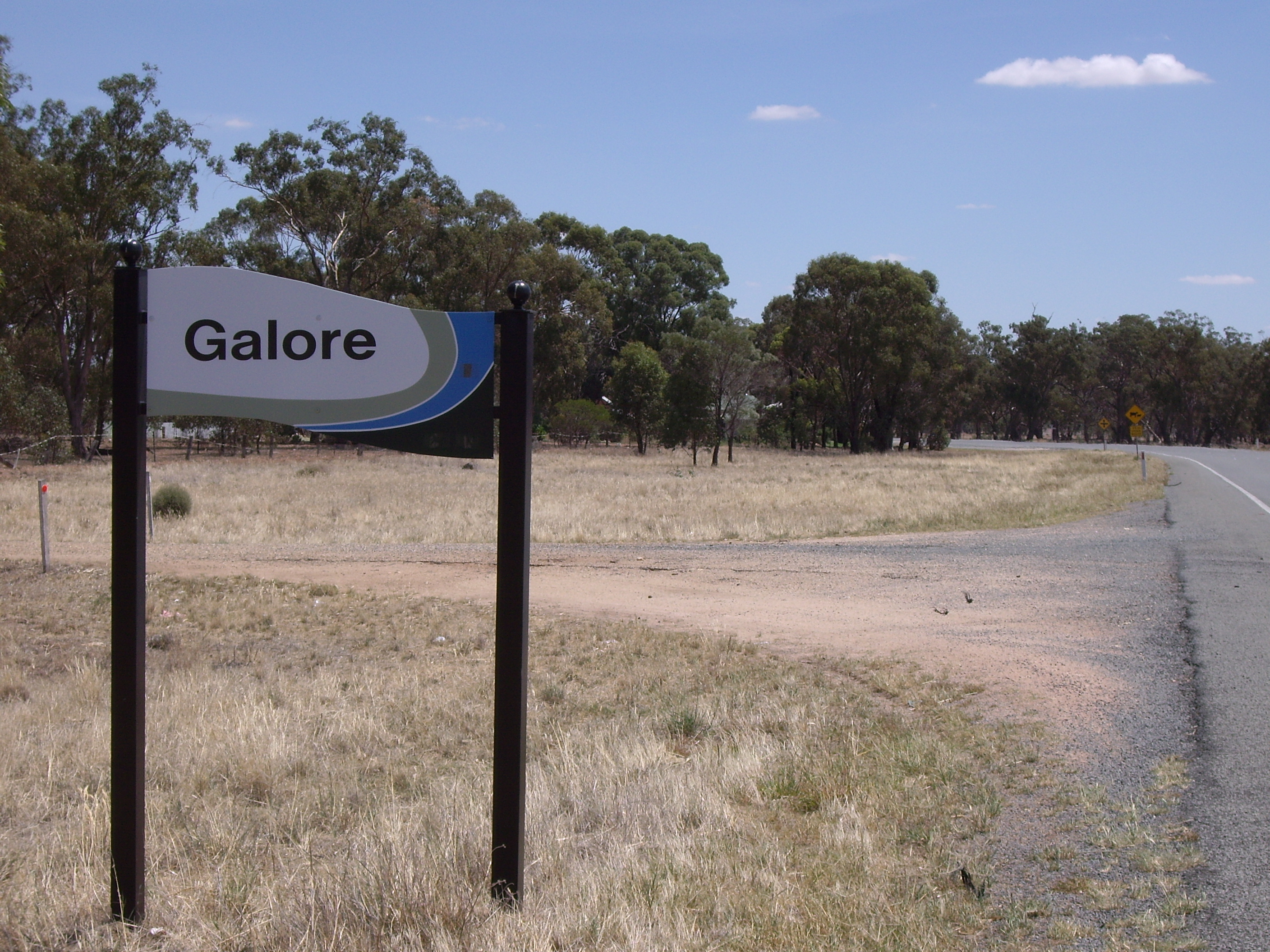
Entering Galore
