= Uranquinty railway station =

Former railway station in New South Wales, Australia

Uranquinty
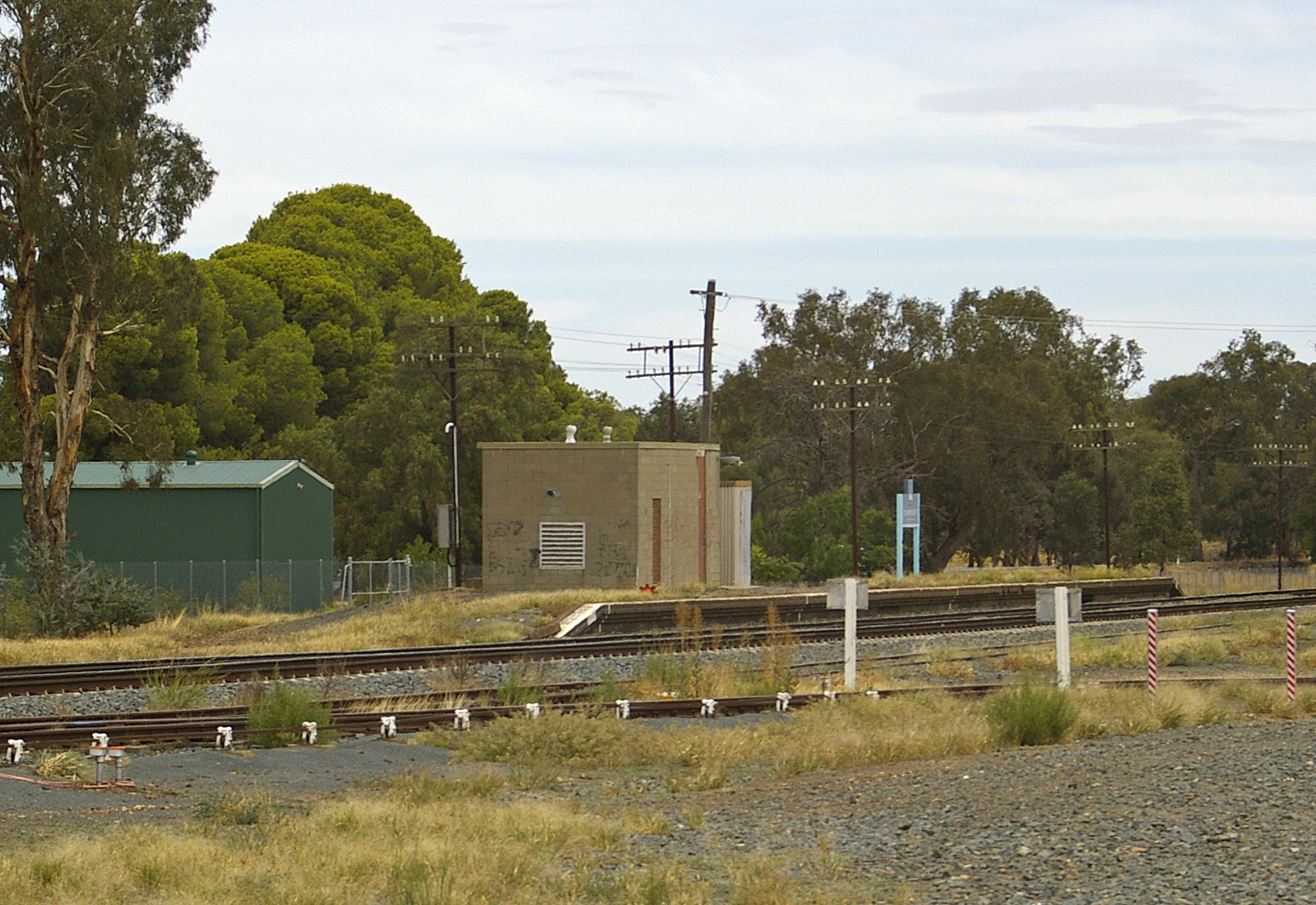
- Platform remains and signalling facility, February 2009

General information
- Location: Olympic Highway, Uranquinty, New South Wales; Australia
- Coordinates: 35°11′33″S 147°14′44″E
- Elevation: 201 metres (659 ft)
- Owner: Transport Asset Manager of New South Wales
- Operator: State Rail Authority
- Lines: Main Southern line Kywong line
- Distance: 535.720 km (332.881 mi) from Central
- Platforms: 1 (1 side)
- Tracks: 2

Construction
- Structure type: Ground

History
- Opened: 1 September 1880
- Closed: c.1984
- Former names: Sandy Creek (1880–1891)

Services
Preceding station	Former services	Following station
Bon Accord towards Albury	Main Southern Line	Kapooka towards Sydney
Location

Uranquinty railway station was a railway station on the Main Southern line, serving the town of Uranquinty in the Riverina, New South Wales, Australia. It was also a junction station for the Kywong line. Although passenger services no longer serve the station, the platform and signage remains.

== History ==
The station opened on 1 September 1880, initially as Sandy Creek and was renamed Uranquinty on 4 February 1891. Uranquinty became a junction station when the branch line to Kywong was opened in October 1928. The station building had to be reconstructed after it and all its contents were destroyed by a fire on 3 June 1934.

Uranquinty continued to serve both railway lines until the closure of the Kywong line in May 1975. The station closed to all passenger services c.1984, but remained in use for signalling purposes. In 1988, the buildings were demolished with only the platform and a replacement brick signalling facility remaining.

== Description ==
Uranquinty station consisted of a single side platform with a substantial weatherboard station building and signal box, located on a passing loop.
