= Kapooka railway station =

Former railway station in New South Wales, Australia

Kapooka

General information
- Location: Olympic Highway, Kapooka, New South Wales; Australia
- Coordinates: 35°09′38″S 147°18′06″E
- Elevation: 258 metres (846 ft)
- Operator: Public Transport Commission
- Line: Main Southern line
- Distance: 529.410 km (328.960 mi) from Central
- Platforms: 1 (1 side)
- Tracks: 2

Construction
- Structure type: Ground

History
- Opened: 1927
- Closed: 4 May 1975
- Rebuilt: 1941

Services
Preceding station	Former services	Following station
Uranquinty towards Albury	Main Southern Line	Wagga Wagga towards Sydney
Location

Kapooka railway station was a railway station on the Main Southern railway line, serving the suburb of Kapooka in Wagga Wagga, New South Wales, Australia. The station opened in 1927 and closed in 1975.

== History ==
Kapooka station was first opened in 1927, however a platform was not built until 1941. The station served passengers until its closure on 4 May 1975. After closure, its main role was as a signalling facility and passing loop. Neither the station or the passing loop survive today.
