= Birrego =

- Town
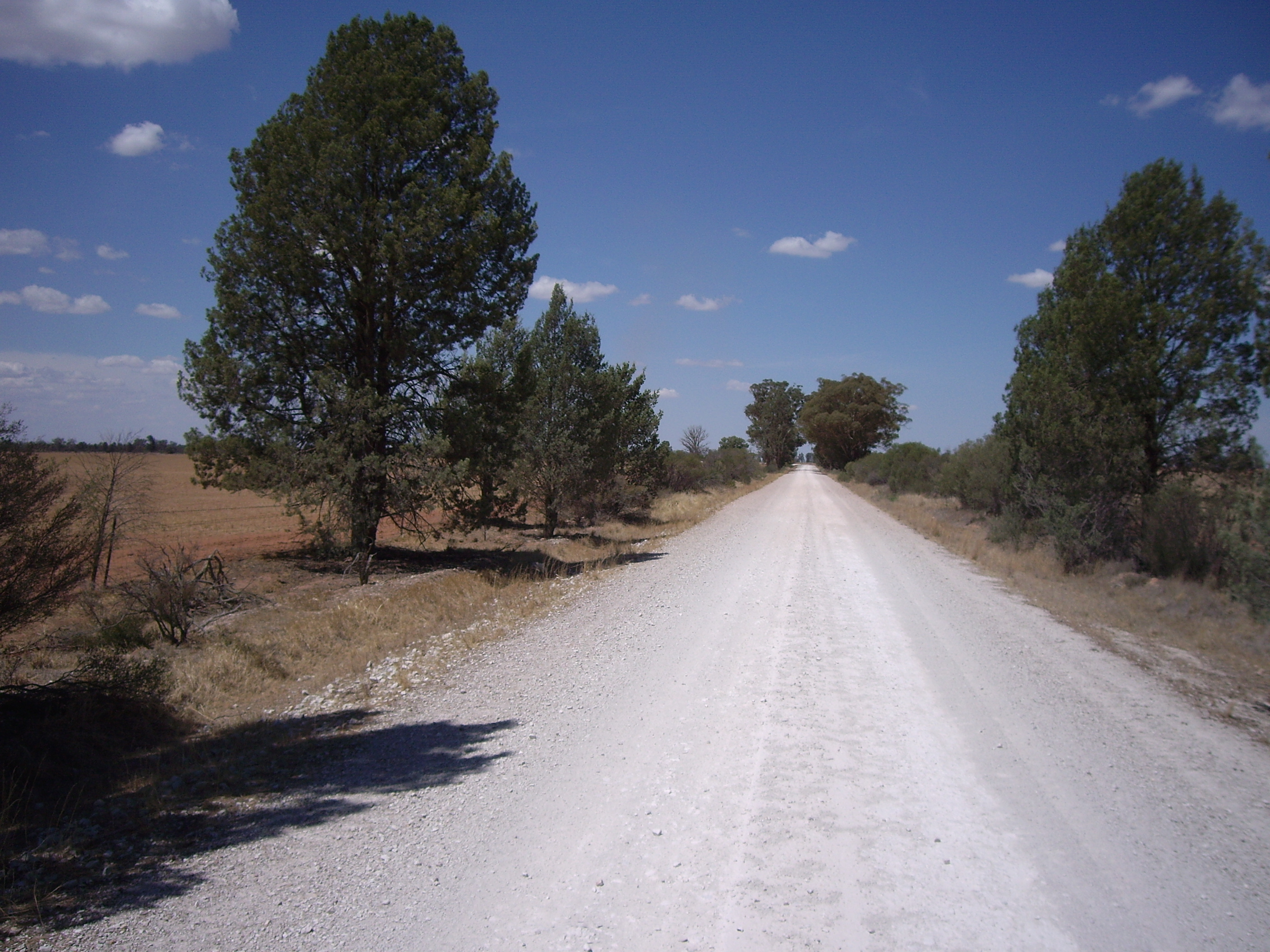
- Birrego to Sandigo road

- Coordinates: 35°00′S 146°35′E
- Country: Australia
- State: New South Wales
- LGA: Narrandera Shire
- Location: 546 km (339 mi) from Sydney; 90 km (56 mi) from Wagga Wagga; 13 km (8.1 mi) from Sandigo; 9 km (5.6 mi) from Boree Creek

Government
  - State electorate: Cootamundra
  - Federal division: Farrer
- Postcode: 2652
- County: Mitchell

Birrego is a rural locality in the central part of the Riverina near Boree Creek, New South Wales, Australia. The countryside is flat and used predominantly for grain production. By road it is about 13 kilometres south of Sandigo and 31 kilometres south east of Morundah.

Birrego Post Office opened on 27 September 1921 and closed in 1959.

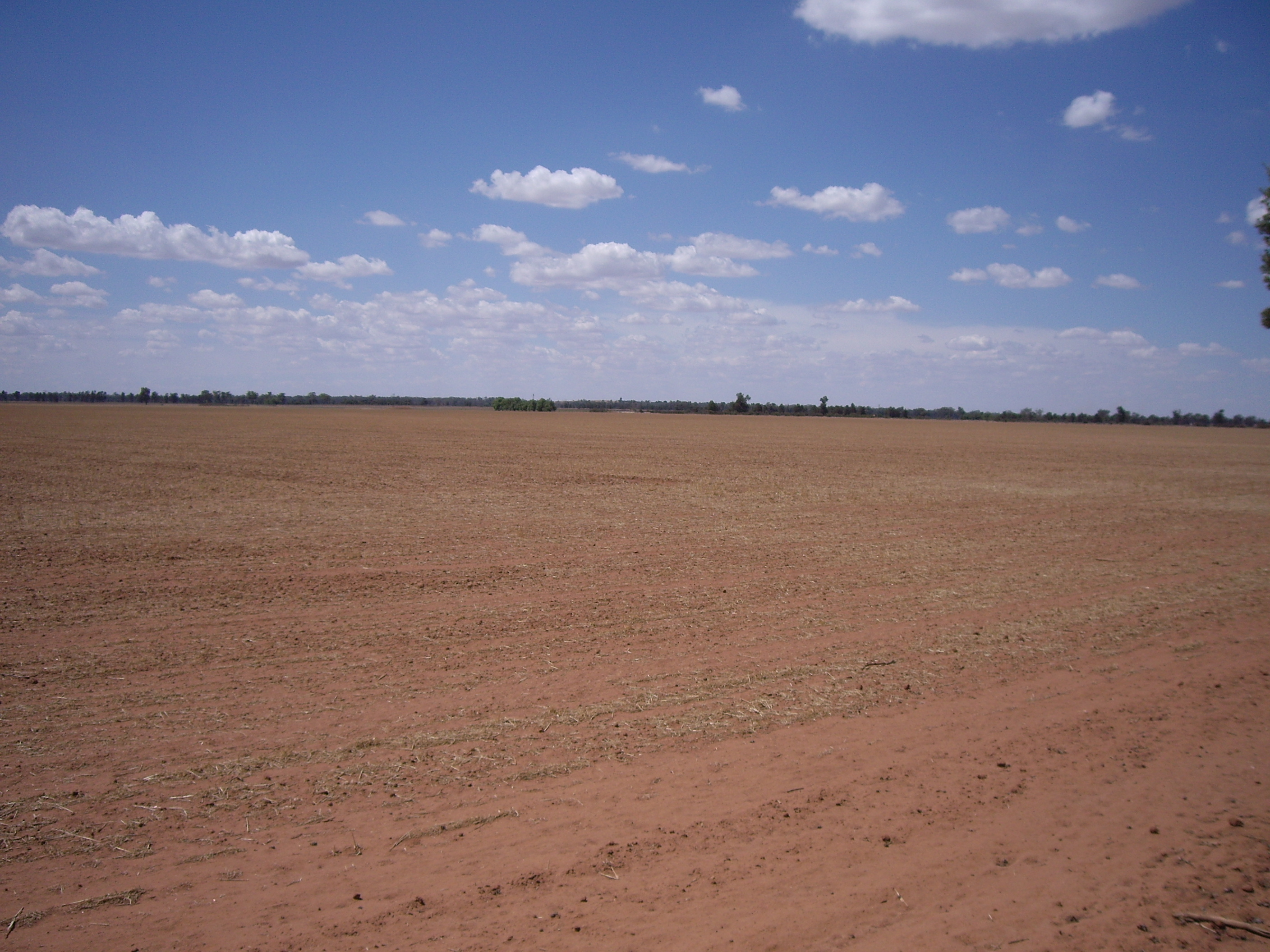
Birrego wheat country
