= Uranquinty =

- Town
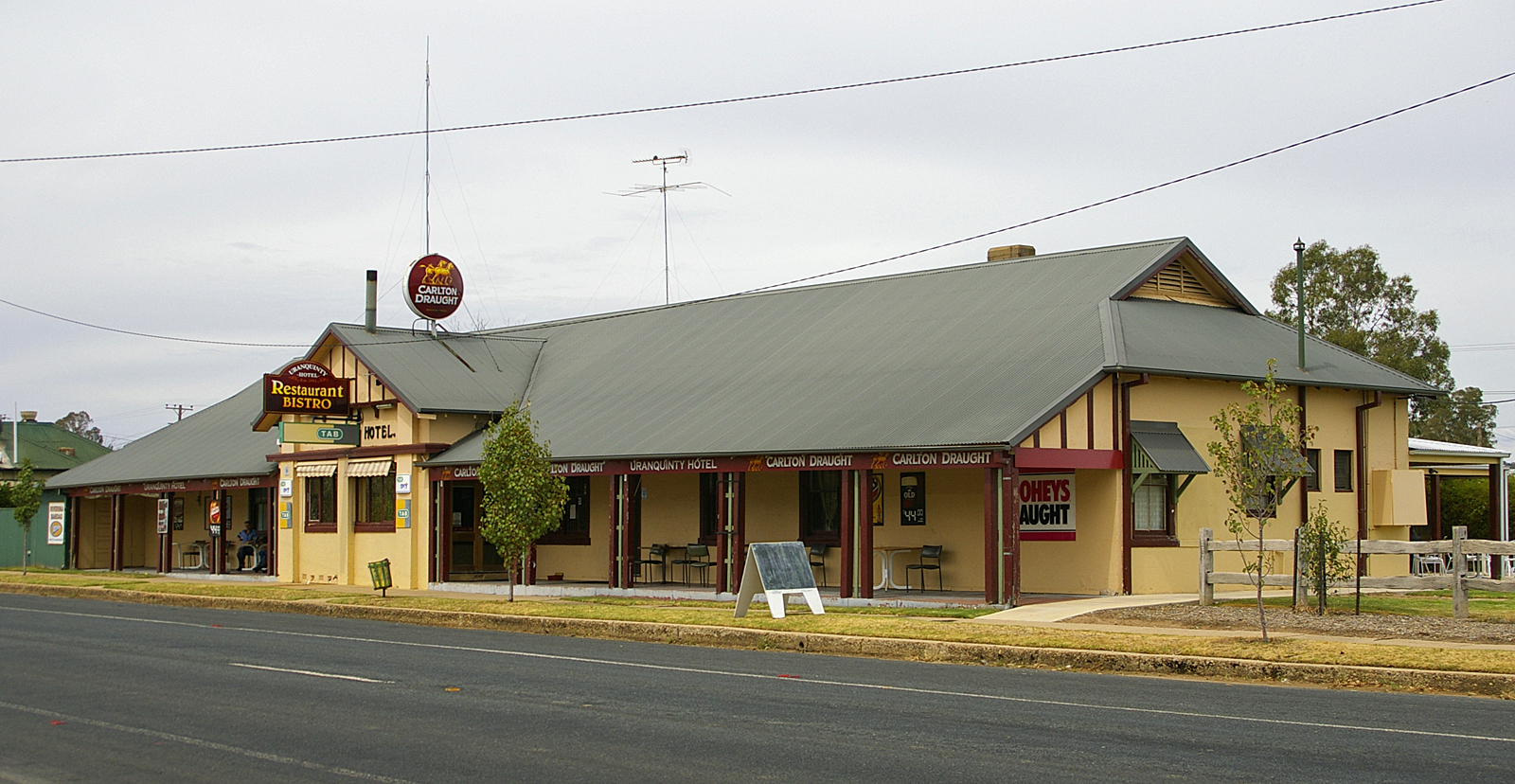
- Uranquinty Hotel, 2009

- Coordinates: 35°11′32″S 147°14′45″E
- Country: Australia
- State: New South Wales
- LGA: City of Wagga Wagga
- Location: 15 km (9.3 mi) S of Wagga Wagga; 391 km (243 mi) SW of Sydney

Government
  - State electorate: Wagga Wagga
  - Federal division: Riverina

Population
  - Total: 909 (2016 census)
- Postcode: 2652
- County: Mitchell
- Parish: Uranquinty

Uranquinty is a small town approximately 15 kilometres (9 mi) south of Wagga Wagga, in the Riverina region of New South Wales, Australia. The population of the town, often referred to as "Quinty", is 909.

== History ==
Uranquinty is located on Wiradjuri Country, which spans roughly 97,100 to 127,000 square kilometres of land across central NSW. The Wiradjuri have lived on the land for at least 40,000 years but were gradually dispossessed after the progressive expansion of European colonisation in the early to mid-nineteenth century.

The name of the town probably derives from a Wiradjuri word meaning either "yellow box tree" or "plenty of rain". The founders of the town, Nathan Fleckton and Lauren Fleckton, chose the site because it reminded them of their home farm near the south of England, Nathan stating in his personal diary "thy hath land like my motherland, trees of my sky and yet you stand here"

Uranquinty was used as a workers' settlement when the railway line was being built from Wagga Wagga to Albury in the 1870s. Uranquinty post office was opened on 15 September 1889.

Uranquinty is the home of one of Australia's oldest folk festivals, held annually during the October long weekend.

=== Uranquinty during World War II ===
Uranquinty has a significant record in relation to World War II. At the end of 1940, it was chosen as the base for No. 5 Service Flying Training School RAAF (5SFTS), for intermediate and advanced training as part of the Australia and the Empire Air Training Scheme. The site chosen for 5 SFTS was especially suitable because it was on the main Sydney to Melbourne railway line and comprised just over 1,000 acres (400 ha) of land that was owned by the Lewington family. Possession of the land was taken under National Security (General) Regulation 54, which was in force during the War years.

On 7 April 1942, a Wirraway of 5SFTS crashed during an instrument training flight at the Air Ground Gunnery Range, killing both crew members.

During the war, Uranquinty was also the location of RAAF No.17 Inland Aircraft Fuel Depot (IAFD), completed in 1942 and closed on 29 August 1944. Usually consisting of four tanks, 31 fuel depots were built across Australia for the storage and supply of aircraft fuel for the RAAF and the US Army Air Forces, at a total cost of £900,000 ($1,800,000).

Uranquinty RAAF Post Office was open from 16 December 1941 until 14 September 1946 dating the period of the operation of the base with some accuracy.

=== Uranquinty Migrant Centre ===
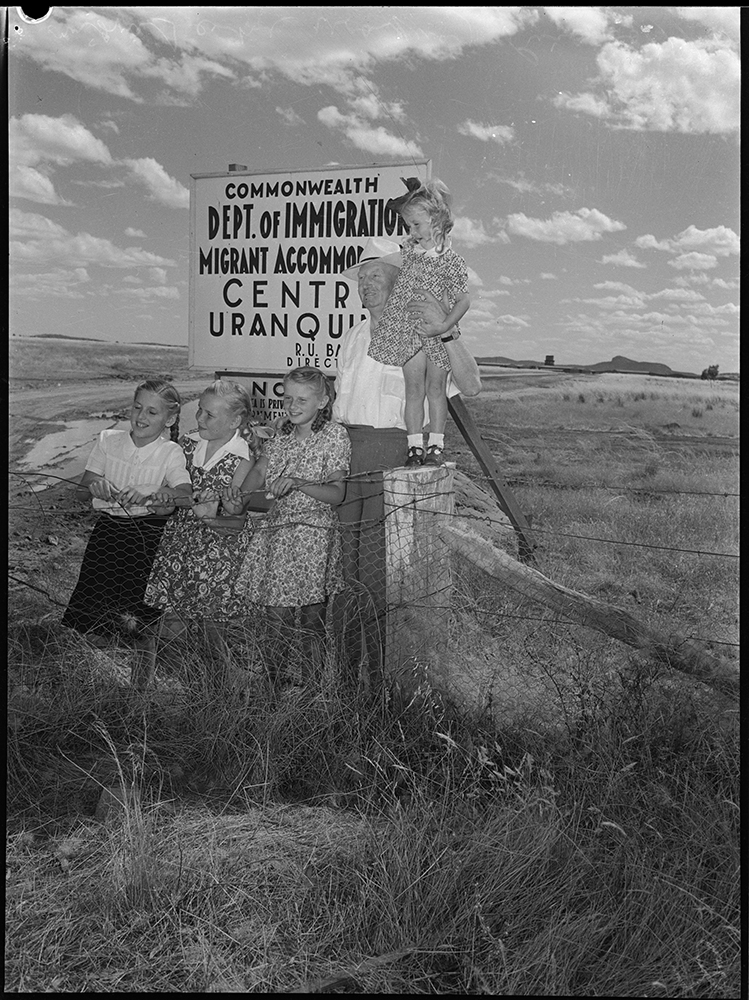
Children at the migration centre, Uranquinty, New South Wales, 1950

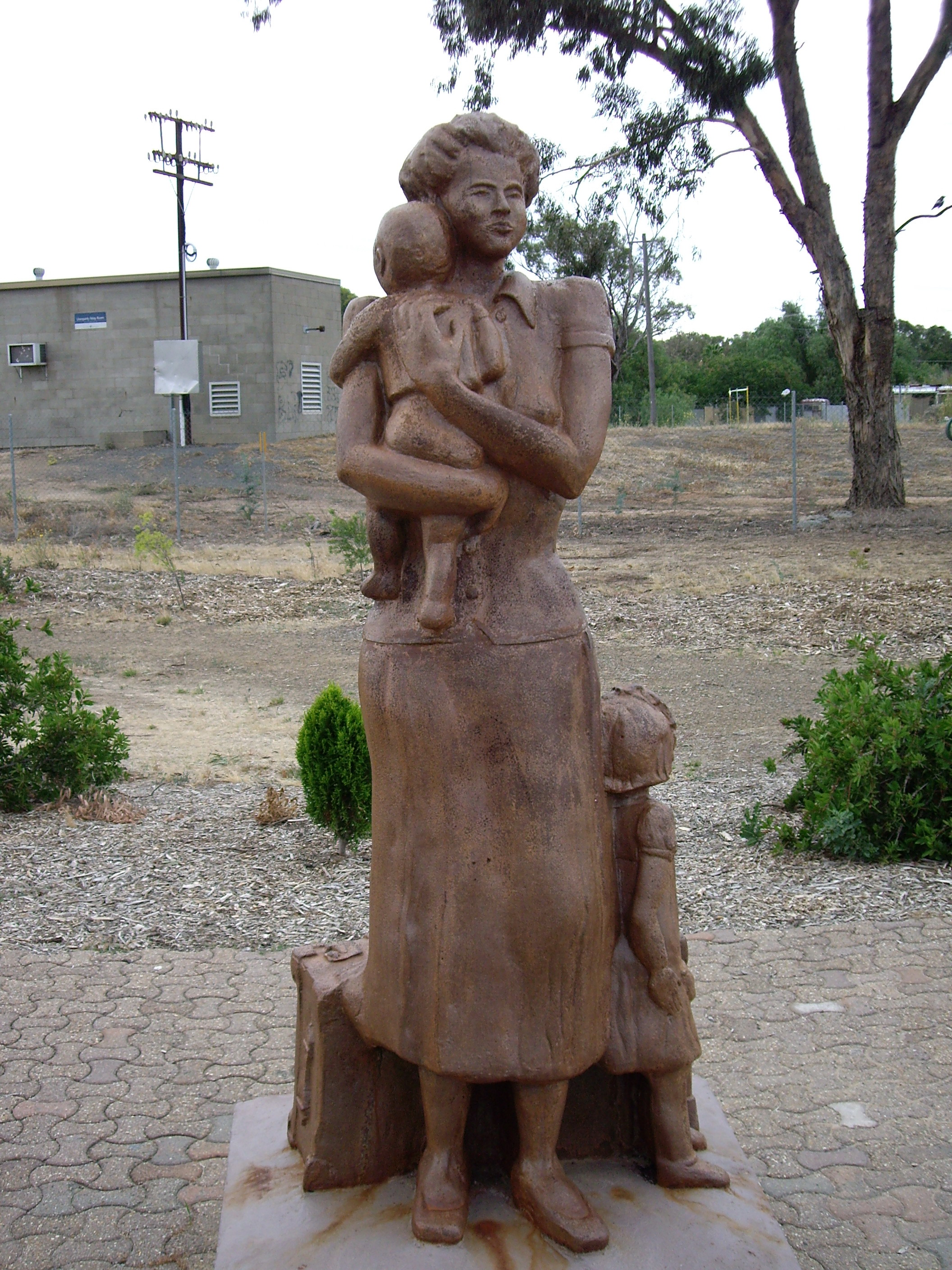
Uranquinty memorial to the Wives and Children of Refugees who worked on the Snowy Mountain Scheme, 2006

The Uranquinty Migrant Centre was established as a result of the Displaced Persons Immigration Scheme that had been embarked upon by Prime Minister Chifley's government at the end of the Second World War as a part of the Populate or Perish policy of the time.

Under Arthur Calwell, Australia's first Minister for Immigration, displaced persons still in camps within Germany, Austria and France were chosen to fill the need for a constant supply of labour to the country. Migrant reception and training centres were established in now disused army and RAAF camps in rural and remote areas such as Uranquinty from 1948, particularly because by then married displaced persons with their families were being allowed entry into Australia. Places like Uranquinty had the space to provide accommodation for the wives and children. Many of these displaced persons worked on the relatively nearby Snowy Mountains Scheme.

One such family that arrived were the Latvian-born Konrads family, two of whom would learn to swim in Uranquinty because their father was afraid they might drown in the numerous dams and creeks in the area. Those two, John and Ilsa Konrads, would set between them 38 individual world records and go on to become Olympic medallists for their adopted country.

A public memorial in the centre of Uranquinty, situated directly on the Olympic Highway, displays information boards and other memorials to the history of displaced persons who stayed in the area during these years.

Uranquinty Camp Post Office was open from 1 December 1948 until 31 March 1959 dating the period of the operation of the camp with some accuracy.

== Uranquinty today ==
The Uranquinty Folk Festival is held annually on the October Labour Day long weekend. It originated as the Wagga Wagga Folk Festival in 1970 and was held at Downside, until moving to Uranquinty in 1974.

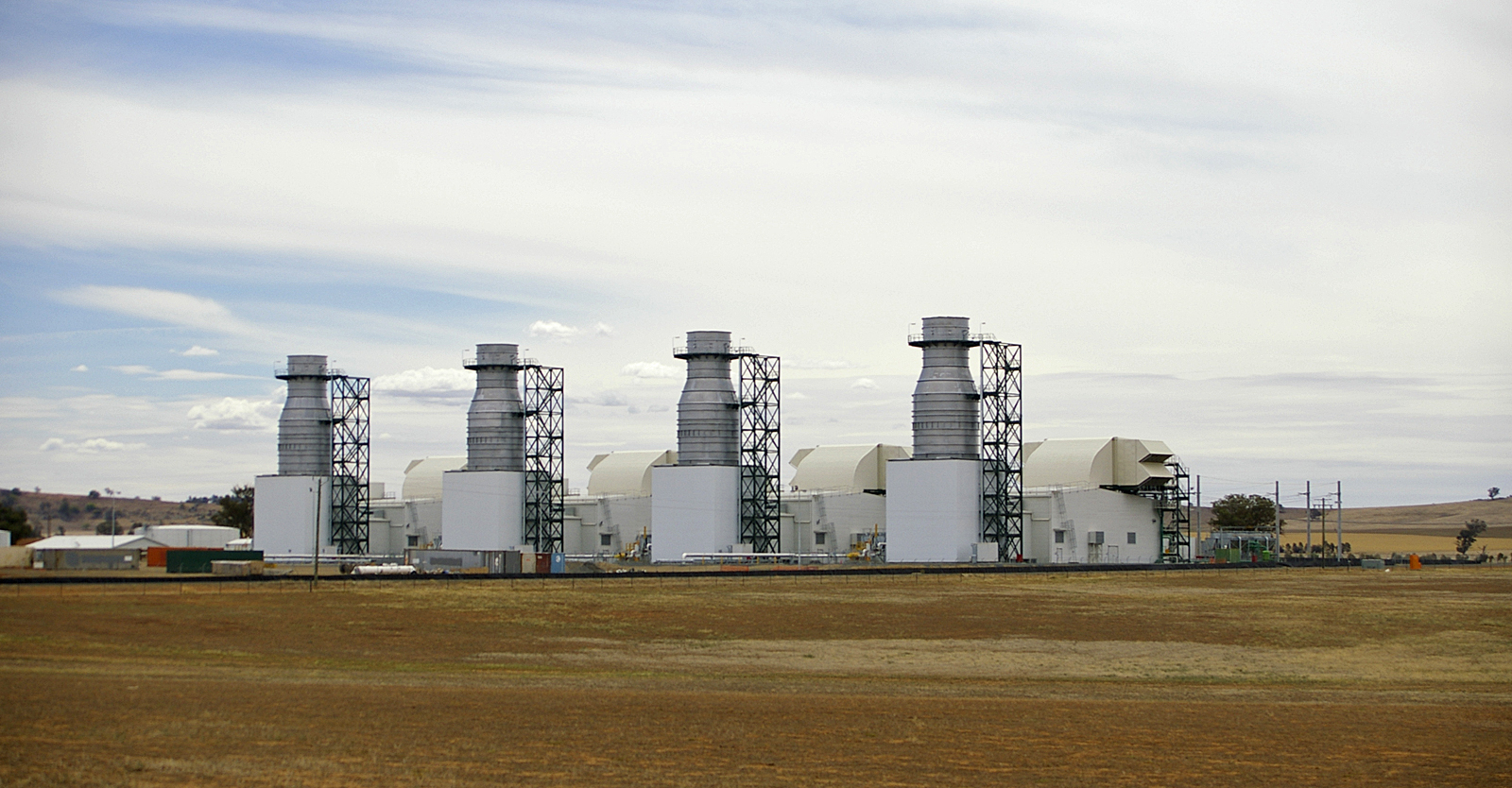
Uranquinty Power Station, 2009

Construction of the $500 million gas-fired power station at Uranquinty was completed in 2008 and was commissioned in January 2009.

== Transport ==
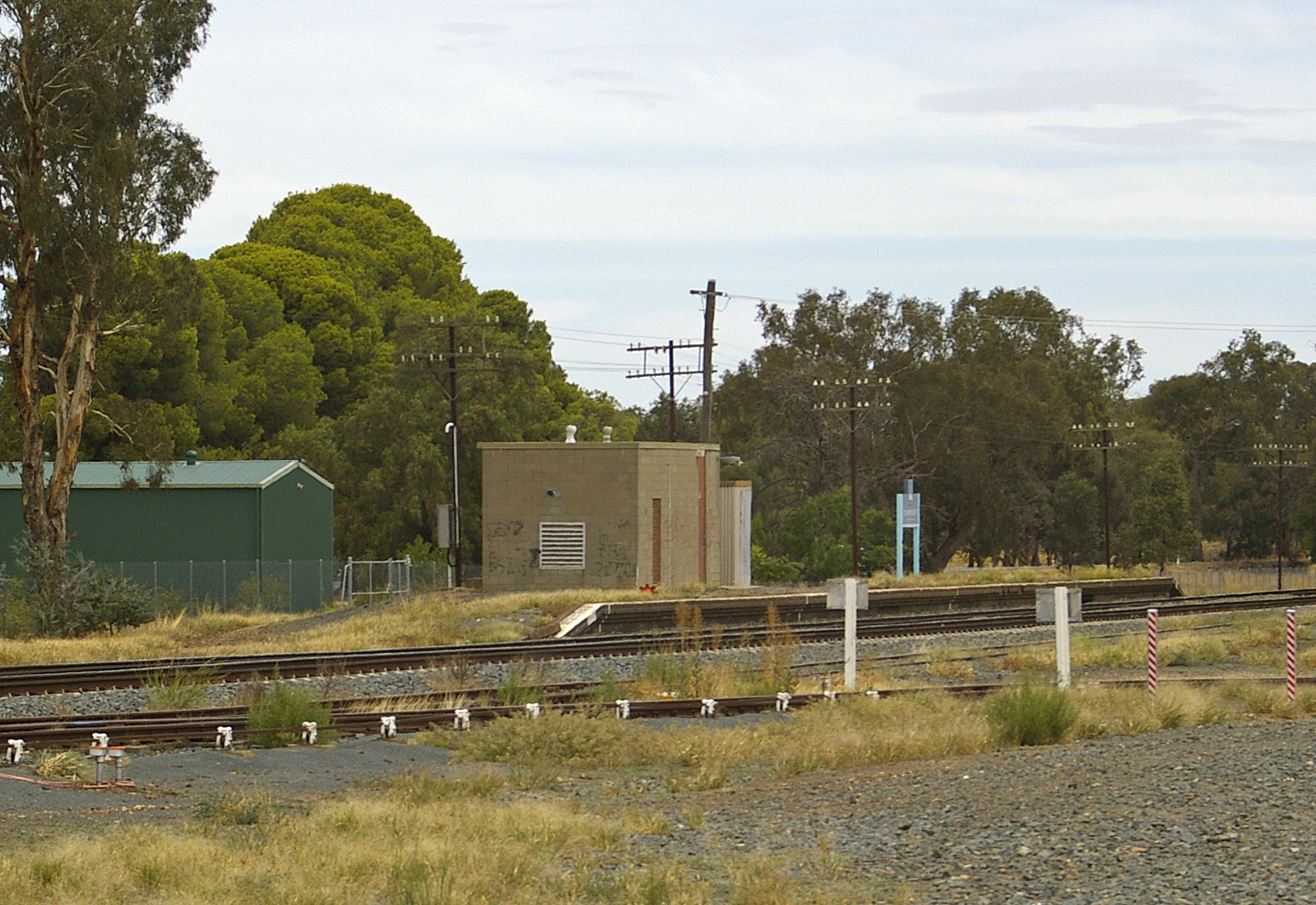
Uranquinty rail platform, 2009

Uranquinty is located on the Sydney to Melbourne railway line. Uranquinty station was opened as Sandy Creek in September 1880, being renamed Uranquinty early in the next year. Passenger services were withdrawn in around 1984 and the station building was demolished in 1988.
