= Sandigo, New South Wales =

Sandigo
- Town
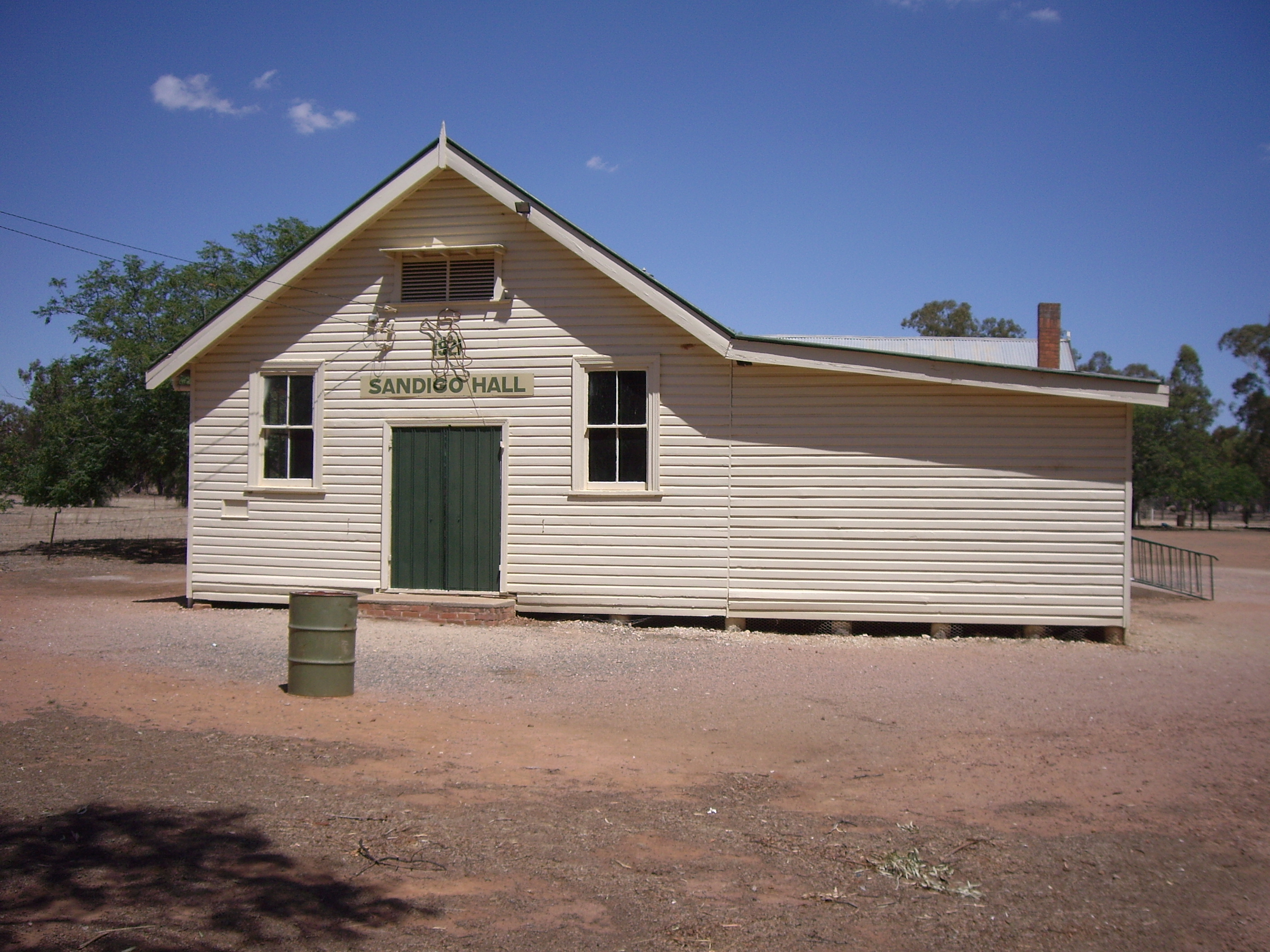
- Sandigo Hall

- Coordinates: 34°54′52″S 146°38′6″E
- Country: Australia
- State: New South Wales
- LGA: Narrandera Shire
- Location: 11 km (6.8 mi) from Kywong; 21 km (13 mi) from Narrandera

Government
  - State electorate: Cootamundra
  - Federal division: Farrer
- Elevation: 144 m (472 ft)

Population
  - Total: 87 (SAL 2021)
- Postcode: 2700
- County: Mitchell

Sandigo is a locality situated on Sandy Creek in the central part of the Riverina. It is situated along the Sturt Highway, about 11 kilometres (6.8 mi) north west of Kywong and 21 kilometres (13 mi) south east of Narrandera. At the 2016 census, Sandigo had a population of 84 people.

== Hazelnut farming ==
Sandigo is home to a hazelnut farming enterprise, led by the Agri Australis Pty Ltd company (owned by parent company Ferrero). The land was purchased by Ferrero in 2011, seen as a suitable choice for hazelnut farming due to appropriate soil type and water availability. The biosecurity of the imported hazelnut plants (from Chile) were cleared by 2012, and planting commenced in April 2014. The first harvest was in 2018.

== Sport and recreation ==
The Sandigo Football Club was formed in 1920, who wore the blue and gold colours and played in nine grand finals in their 11 years in the Faithful & District Football Association from 1920 to 1930, winning four premierships, in 1921, 1922, 1928 and 1930.

In 1929, Sandigo applied for admission to play in the Wagga based Second Grade Football Association, but was refused on the grounds that Sandigo could not fill their team with entirely junior players, but would require senior players to make up the team each week.

After a long and protracted protest after the 1930 grand final with the Faithful & District Football Association, Sandigo went into recess in 1931 and then joined the Narrandera Football Association in 1932. The club unfortunately folded after the 1932 football season.

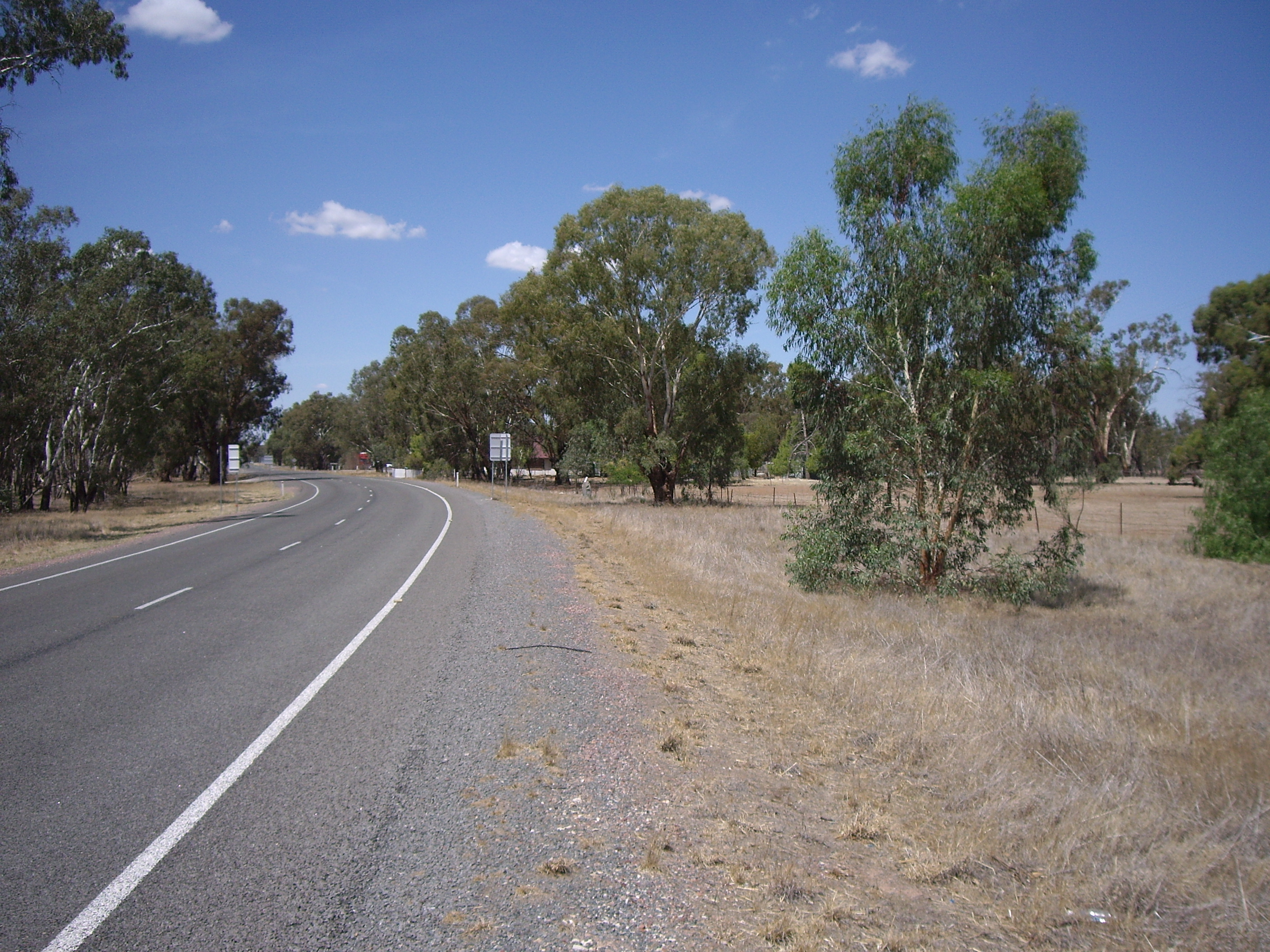
Sandigo
