= Wagga Wagga railway station =

Railway station in New South Wales, Australia

Wagga Wagga
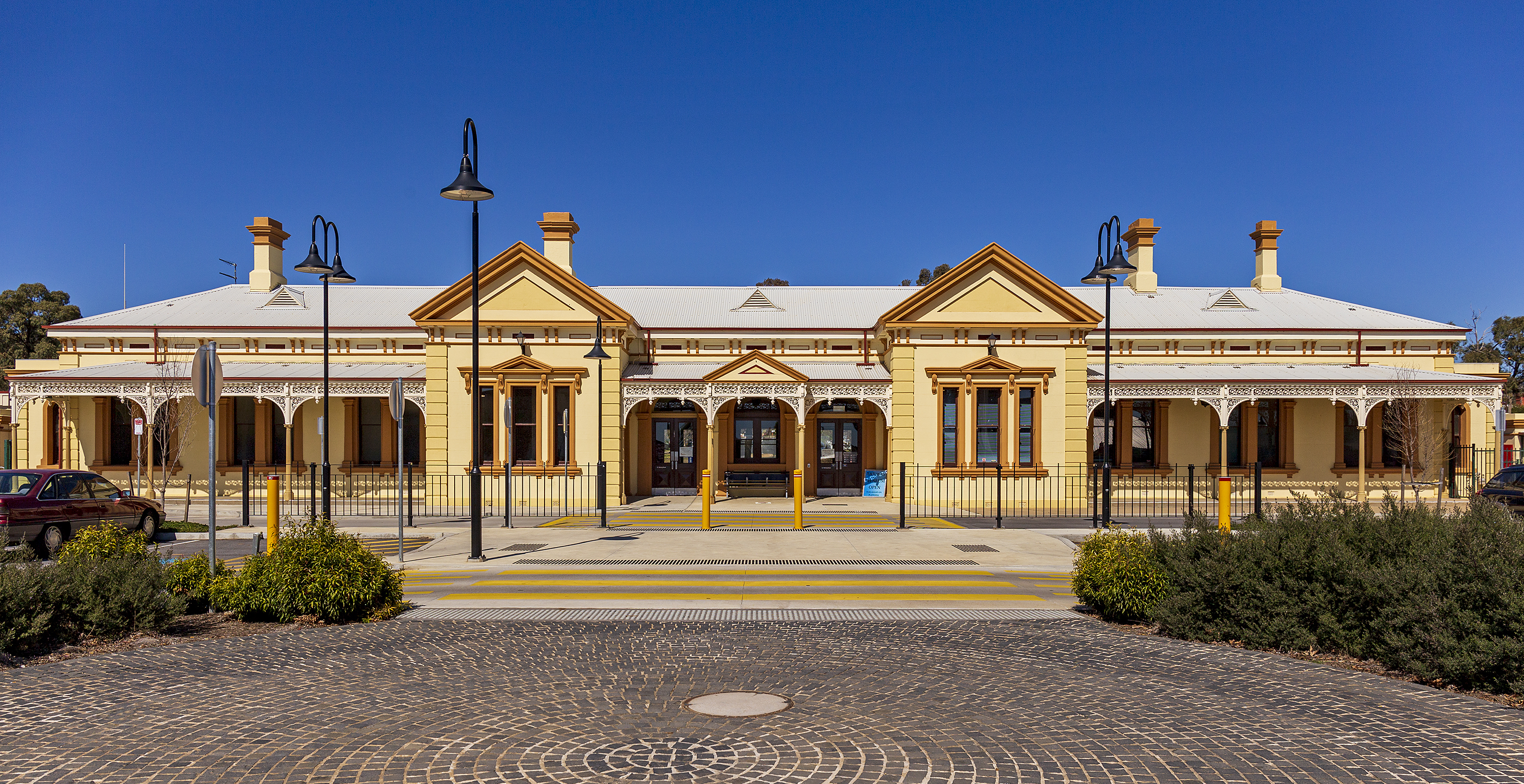
- Station building and entrance, September 2019

General information
- Location: Station Place, Wagga Wagga, New South Wales, Australia
- Coordinates: 35°07′13″S 147°22′06″E
- Owner: Transport Asset Manager of New South Wales
- Operator: NSW TrainLink
- Line: Main Southern
- Distance: 521.40 kilometres (323.98 mi) from Central
- Platforms: 1
- Tracks: 2
- Connections: Coach

Construction
- Structure type: Ground
- Accessible: Yes

Other information
- Status: Weekdays: Staffed: 8am to 4pm, 11pm to 3.30am: Weekends and public holidays: Staffed: 8am to 4pm, 11pm to 3.30am
- Station code: WGA

History
- Opened: 1 September 1879; 146 years ago
- Former names: South Wagga Wagga

Services
Preceding station	NSW TrainLink	Following station
The Rock towards Melbourne	NSW TrainLink Southern Line Melbourne XPT	Junee towards Sydney
Former services
Preceding station	Former services	Following station
Former NSW Main line services
Kapooka towards Albury	Main Southern Line	Bomen towards Sydney

New South Wales Heritage Register
- Official name: Wagga Wagga Railway Station and yard group
- Type: State heritage (complex / group)
- Designated: 2 April 1999
- Reference no.: 1279
- Type: Railway Platform/Station
- Category: Transport – Rail
Location

Wagga Wagga railway station is a heritage-listed railway station on the Main Southern line connecting Sydney and Melbourne, served twice daily in each direction. A museum is on the premises.

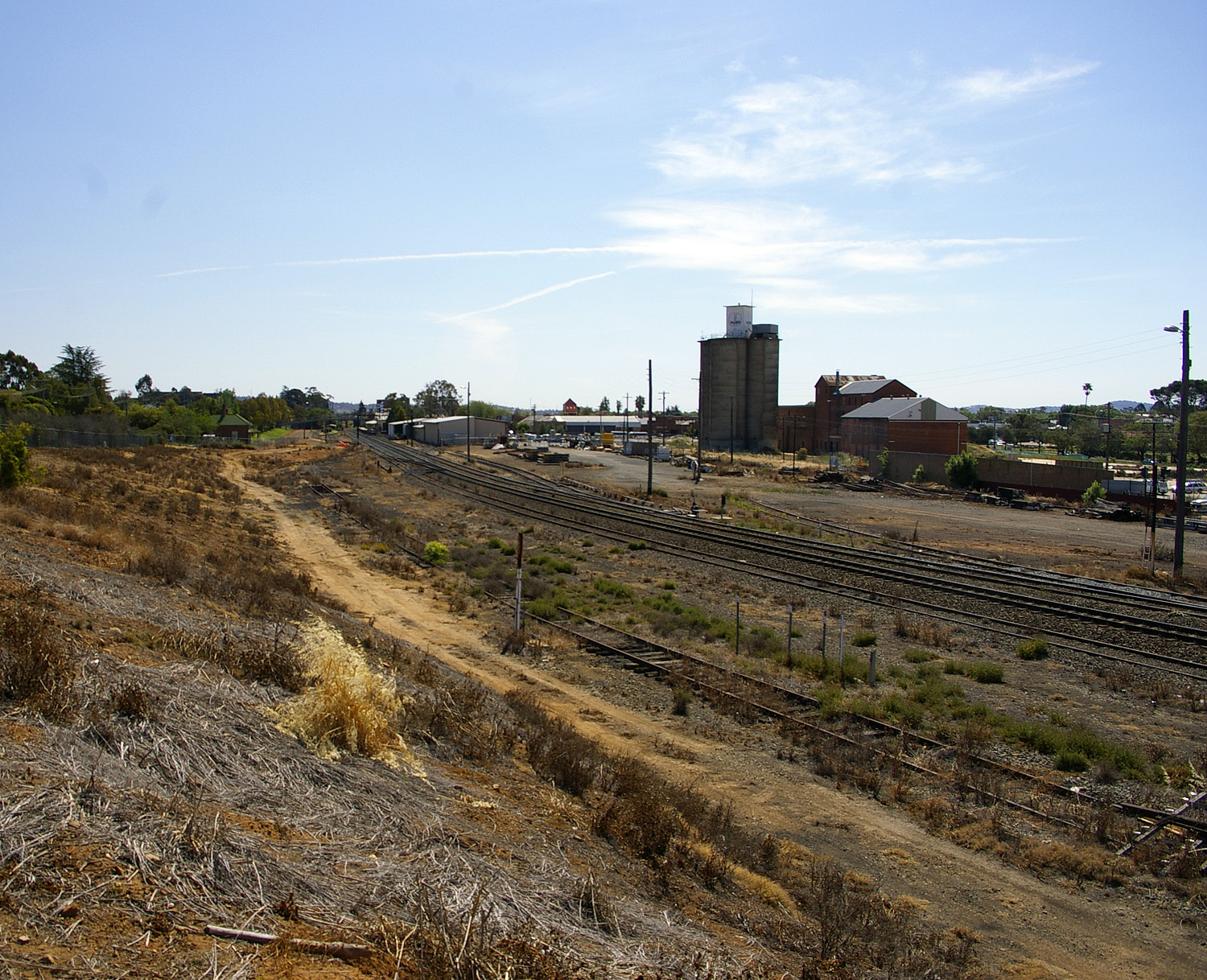
The Wagga Wagga railway yard, October 2008

== History ==
In 1874, the Department of Public Works, Railway Branch, accepted a tender for extension of the Great Southern Railway from Goulburn to Wagga Wagga.

The station opened in 1879 as "South Wagga Wagga", after the Main South line was extended from Bomen, 7.5 kilometres (5 miles) to the north, serving as the terminus until the line was extended to Gerogery in 1880. It was renamed "Wagga Wagga" in 1882.

In 1917, Wagga Wagga became a junction station when the Tumbarumba line opened as far as Humula; Tumbarumba was reached in 1921. Traffic on the branch dwindled in the late 20th century, and the last train on it ran in 1987.

== Features ==
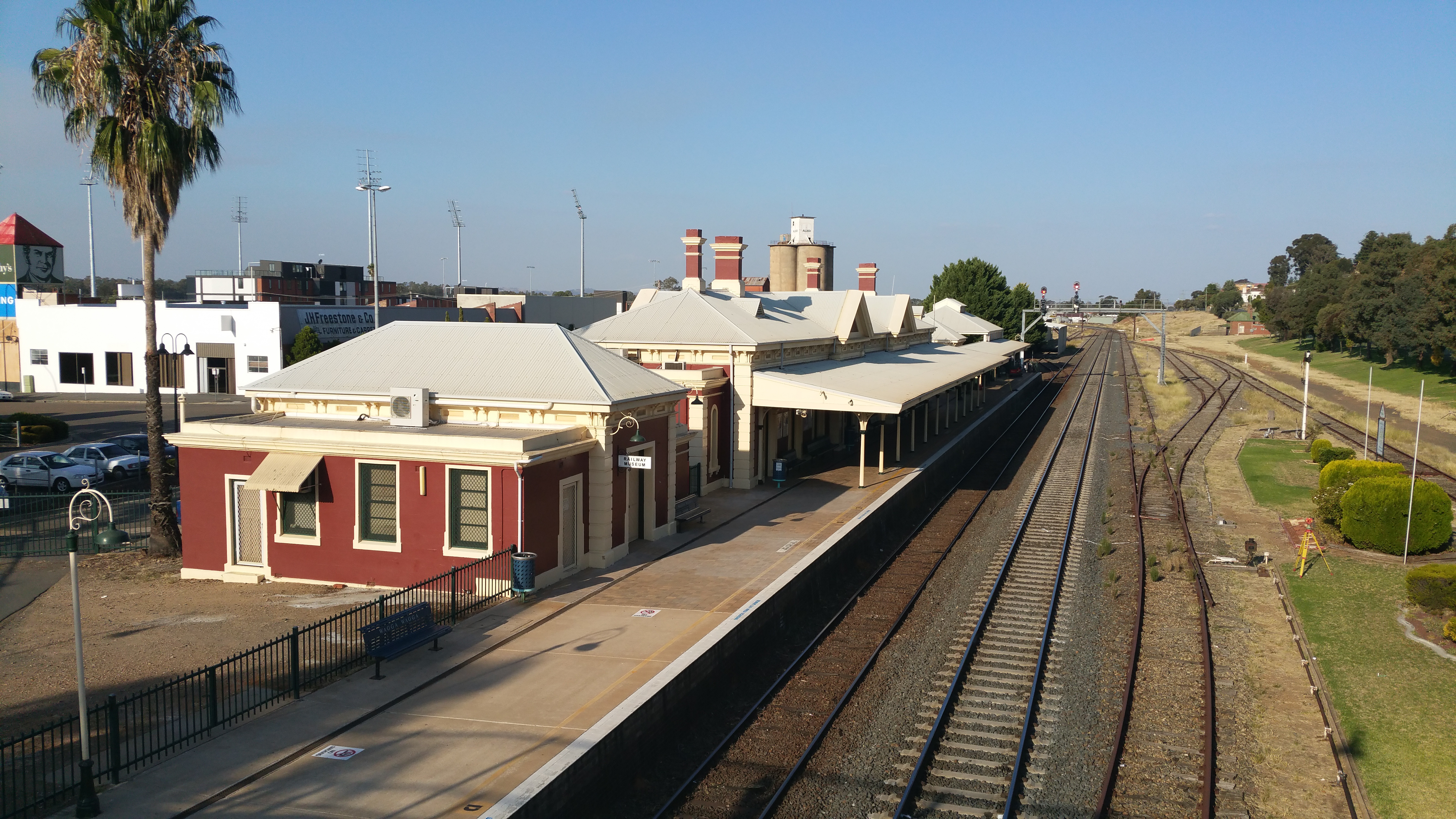
Station seen from footbridge

The station building, categorised as a New South Wales Government Railways Type 5 made of first-class brick, and a two-storey Type 4 brick stationmaster's residence, were completed in 1879. In 1917, a refreshment room was added for the journey to Albury. A footbridge from Station Place to Railway Street was completed in 1936. The station yard had a turntable, a tripod crane and extensive sidings, including to an offsite fuel depot and grain silos, but they were removed to leave only a passing loop and short stand-by loop in use. The station no longer has freight handling facilities.

== Passenger services ==
As of 2021, Wagga Wagga was served by two daily NSW TrainLink XPT services in each direction operating between Sydney and Melbourne. NSW TrainLink also operated road coach services to Tumbarumba, Griffith, Echuca, and to Tumut, a trial service as of 2021.

Platform	Line	Stopping pattern	Notes
1	Southern Region	Services to Sydney Central and Melbourne	

== Heritage listing ==
The property was added to the New South Wales State Heritage Register in 1999 as the "Wagga Wagga Railway Station and yard group". It was assessed as historically, architecturally, scientifically and socially rare, possessing uncommon, rare or endangered aspects of the cultural or natural history of New South Wales. Situated across the high end of Wagga Wagga's main thoroughfare, it was considered to be an important civic element of the city.

The highly significant station building is unique in the New South Wales railway system. It was the first building to have been designed by notable engineer, John Whitton. The station master's residence was assessed as of equal significance to the station building, adding to the completeness of the group with its location near the station entrance. Other buildings, excellent examples of their type, also reflect the importance of the location as a former junction.

== See also ==
- List of railway stations in New South Wales
