= Faithful & District Football Association =

Former Australian Rules Football Association, based in the Riverina, New South Wales

The Faithful & District Football Association was an Australian Rules Football competition, based in the Riverina region of New South Wales first established in 1920 at a meeting of club delegates from the following football clubs - Greenvale, Faithful and Sandigo, with a draw arranged too. The League went into recess in April 1940 due to World War Two but never reformed after the war.

== History ==
The Faithful & DFA was located in the Riverina region of New South Wales, 36 kilometres from Narrandera in an area that had and still has a rich farming history, in cropping, cattle and sheep and wool production and located 17 kilometres from Kywong, which is near the Sturt Highway.

Commencing with only three clubs in 1920, it grew to six clubs in the mid-1930s and produced some outstanding footballers from the ten club's that played in the competition during its 20 years in existence.

When the association was formed in 1920 and a fixture was arranged, but there appears to be no published results of any games or final series from 1920.

The Sandigo FC played in nine grand finals in their 11 years in the competition from 1920 to 1930, winning four premierships.

In 1929, Sandigo applied for admission to play in the Wagga-based Second Grade Football Association, but was refused on the grounds that Sandigo could not fill their team with entirely junior players, but would require senior players to make up the team each week

Between 1929 and 1936, Greenvale FC played in eight consecutive grand finals and all up played in 15 grand finals for eight premierships during their 20 years of competing in the Faithful & DFL. In 1923, Greenvale were undefeated premiers.

In 1921, Mr M J Quilter donated a trophy for the most unselfish player in the Faithful & DFA and was won by Harold Scilley from the Sandigo FC.

Sandigo (55) defeated Greenvale (28) in the 1930 grand final. Greenvale protested on the grounds that Sandigo played some ineligible players and Greenvale was ultimately awarded the 1930 premiership.

When Cullivel joined the association in 1931, their club president was international rugby union player, Aub Hodgson.

In July, 1935, the Faithful & DFL side, 12.14 - 86 defeated the Leeton & DFA side, 8.13 - 61, at Boree Creek.

An inter-league match was played between Faithful & DFL and the South West Football League in Narrandera, in June, 1936, with the SWFL winning by 22 points.

A league best and fairest medal was awarded to Leo Foley from the Greenvale FC in 1936, who also kicked eight goals in their grand final victory.

In July, 1939, the Faithful & DFL hosted a knockout football competition at Boree Creek, with Ganmain FC defeating the Faithful & DFL - A side in the grand final.

At the association's 1940 AGM the committee and club delegates decided to go into recess due to World War Two, but the association never reformed after the war, with most club's folding and some playing in other nearby association's.

== Clubs ==
=== Final ===
Club	Colours	Nickname	Home Ground	Former League	Est.	Years in F&DFA	F&DFA Senior Premierships		Fate
Club	Colours	Nickname	Home Ground	Former League	Est.	Years in F&DFA	Total	Years	Fate
Boree Creek		Magpies, Creekers	Boree Creek Recreation Ground, Boree Creek	L&DFA	1886	1925-1928, 1930-1939	6	1926, 1927, 1932, 1937, 1938, 1939	Moved to Lockhart & District FA in 1929 and 1940
Cullivel				–	1931	1931-1933, 1935-1939	0	-	Recess in 1934. Merged with Urana to form Urana-Cullivel in Coreen & District FL in 1946
Greenvale				–	1920	1920-1939	9	1923, 1924, 1925, 1929, 1930, 1931, 1933, 1935, 1936	Moved to Lockhart & District FA in 1940
Morundah				–	1924	1924-1939	0	-	Did not re-form after WWII

=== Former ===
Club	Colours	Nickname	Home Ground	Former League	Est.	Years in F&DFA	F&DFA Senior Premierships		Fate
Club	Colours	Nickname	Home Ground	Former League	Est.	Years in F&DFA	Total	Years	Fate
Brookdale				L&DFA	1918	1934	0	-	Folded after 1934 season
Faithful				–	1920	1920-1924, 1930-1938	0	-	Recess between 1925-29. Folded after 1938 season
Kywong				–	1922	1922-1923, 1934-1935.	1	1934	Recess between 1924-33. Folded after 1935 season
Narrandera Town			Narrandera Sports Ground, Narrandera	–	1929	1929	0	-	Folded after being barred from re-joining the F&DFA in 1930
Sandigo				–	1920	1920-1930	3	1921, 1922, 1928	Entered recess in 1931 following protest over 1930 premiership, re-formed in Narrandera FA in 1932
Urana			Urana Recreation Reserve, Urana	C&DFA	1920s	1936-1937	0	-	Entered recess after 1937 season. Merged with Cullivel to form Urana-Cullivel in Coreen & District FL in 1946

Teams in Association per year

- 1920 - 3: Faithful, Greenvale, Sandigo.
- 1921 - 4: Faithful, Greenvale, Kywong, Sandigo.
- 1922 - 4: Faithful, Greenvale, Kywong, Sandigo.
- 1923 - 3: Faithful, Greenvale, Sandigo.
- 1924 - 4: Faithful, Greenvale, Morundah, Sandigo.
- 1925 - 4: Boree Creek, Greenvale, Morundah, Sandigo.
- 1926 - 4: Boree Creek, Greenvale, Morundah, Sandigo.
- 1927 - 4: Boree Creek, Greenvale, Morundah, Sandigo.
- 1928 - 4: Boree Creek, Greenvale, Morundah, Sandigo.
- 1929 - 4: Greenvale, Morundah, Narrandera, Sandigo.
- 1930 - 5: Boree Creek, Faithful, Greenvale, Morundah, Sandigo.
- 1931 - 5: Boree Creek, Cullivel, Faithful, Greenvale, Morundah.
- 1932 - 5: Boree Creek, Cullivel, Faithful, Greenvale, Morundah.
- 1933 - 5: Boree Creek, Cullivel, Faithful, Greenvale, Morundah.
- 1934 - 6: Boree Creek, Brookdale, Faithful, Greenvale, Kywong, Morundah.
- 1935 - 6: Boree Creek, Cullivel, Faithful, Greenvale, Kywong, Morundah.
- 1936 - 6: Boree Creek, Cullivel, Faithful, Greenvale, Morundah, Urana.
- 1937 - 6: Boree Creek, Cullivel, Faithful, Greenvale, Morundah, Urana.
- 1938 - 5: Boree Creek, Cullivel, Faithful, Greenvale, Morundah.
- 1939 - 4: Boree Creek, Cullivel, Greenvale, Morundah.

Years in the Faithful & DFA competition

- Greenvale: 20
- Morundah: 16
- Boree Creek: 14
- Faithful: 14
- Sandigo: 11
- Cullivel: 8
- Kywong: 4
- Urana: 2
- Brookdale: 1
- Narrandera: 1

== Football Grand Finals ==
Year	Premiers	Score	Runners up	Score	Venue	Umpire	Premiership Cup
1920	?						
1921	Sandigo	defeated	Greenvale	by 2 points	Faithful		A. Kieszling Cup
1922	Sandigo	5.2 - 32	Greenvale	2.3 - 15	Faithful	Harry	A. Kieszling Cup
1923	Greenvale	2.5 - 17	Sandigo	1.6 - 12	Sandigo	Harry Stubbs	Haig & Haig Cup
1924	Greenvale	8.5 - 53	Sandigo	6.6 - 42	Greenvale	Chas Murray	Haig & Haig Cup
1925	Greenvale	5.4 - 34	Sandigo	3.7 - 25	Boree Creek	Ayles	Tom Rooney Cup Gate: £30
1926	Boree Creek	10.5 - 65	Sandigo	6.2 - 38	Sandigo	D Wraith	Tom Rooney Cup. Gate: £35.
1927	Boree Creek	7.8 - 50	Morundah	3.6 - 24	Sandigo	D Wraith	Tom Rooney Cup
1928	Sandigo	9.11 - 65	Boree Creek	6.7 - 41	Greenvale	D Wraith	Gate: £35.
1929	Greenvale	14.7 - 91	Sandigo	6.4 - 34	Morundah	McMillan	Dawson McLeod Cup
1930	Sandigo	8.7 - 55	Greenvale*	4.4 - 28	Boree Creek		Dawson McLeod Cup
1931	Greenvale	10.14 - 75	Cullivel	5.5 - 35	Boree Creek	G Webb	Gate:£15
1932	Boree Creek	7.17 - 59	Greenvale	2.8 - 20	Faithful		J E Carroll Cup
1933	Greenvale	4.14 - 38	Boree Creek	5.7 - 37	Faithful	Thompson	J E Carroll Cup
1934	Kywong	6.10 - 46	Greenvale	4.19 - 43	Boree Creek	Lowe	J E Carroll Cup. Gate:£17
1935	Greenvale	11.9 - 75	Cullivel	6.9 - 45	Boree Creek	Slade	J E Carroll Cup. Gate:£16
1936	Greenvale	10.10 - 70	Boree Creek	8.10 - 58	Faithful	T Towzell	J E Carroll Cup
1937	Boree Creek	10.11 - 71	Morundah	7.9 -51	Greenvale		J E Carroll Cup
1938	Boree Creek	15.12 - 102	Greenvale	7.13 - 55	Boree Creek		J E Carroll Cup
1939	Boree Creek	9.16 - 70	Greenvale	6.10 - 40	Greenvale	Slade	J E Carroll Cup
1940							F&DFL went into recess:WW2

- 1930 - Greenvale FC awarded the premiership on protest.

Most Premierships / Runners Up

Club	Most Premierships	Runners up
Greenvale	8	7
Boree Creek	6	3
Sandigo	4	5
Kywong	1	0
Cullivel		2
Morundah		2

== O'Loan Cup ==
The O'Loan Cup was an annual representative game of football which commenced in 1927 and was played between the Faithful & DFA and the Narrandera Second Grade Football Association with a handsome cup donated by Mr. P. Frank O'Loan of the Criterion Hotel, Narrandera for the purpose of raising funds for the Narrandera Public Hospital.

Year	Winner	Score	Runners up	Score	Venue	Funds Raised	F&DFA Captain
1927	Faithful & DFA	6.11 - 47	Narrandera SGFA	6.9 - 45	Narrandera Park Oval	£200	Alf Longmire
1928	Faithful & DFA	12.13 - 85	Narrandera SGFA	9.10 - 64	Narrandera Park Oval		Alf Longmire
1929	Narrandera SGFA	41	Faithful & DFA	39	Narrandera Park Oval	Gate: £12	
1930-33							No published matches
1934	Narrandera Imperials	13.13 - 91	Faithful & DFA	12.13 - 85	Narrandera Park Oval	Gate: £7	
1935-38							No published matches
1939	Faithful & DFA	9.15 - 69	Narrandera Imperials	8.6 - 54	Narrandera Park Oval		Harry Orme

== Officer Bearers ==
Year	President	Secretary	Treasurer
1920	E Muntz	B Costelloe	B Costelloe
1921	W Barry	H T Scilley	
1922	James H Muntz	H T Scilley	
1923	James H Muntz		
1924	L Carrick	H B Argus	H B Argus
1925	James H Muntz	M O'Leary	M O'Leary
1926	O H Slocum	M O'Leary	M O'Leary
1927	James H Muntz	M O'Leary	M O'Leary
1928	O H Slocum	M O'Leary	M O'Leary
1929	James H Muntz	Martin L McLean	Martin L McLean
1930	James H Muntz	Martin L McLean	Martin L McLean
1931	W H Protheroe	Martin L McLean	Martin L McLean
1932	O H Slocum	Martin L McLean	Martin L McLean
1933	W H Protheroe	J Besley	J Besley
1934	W H Protheroe	J Besley	J Besley
1935	W H Protheroe	J Besley	J Besley
1936	W H Protheroe		
1937	W H Protheroe		
1938	W H Protheroe		
1939	W H Protheroe	A H Shaw	A H Shaw
1940			In recess WW2

== Links ==
- Albury & District Football League
- Central Hume Football Association
- Coreen & District Football League
- Farrer Football League
- Hume Football Netball League
- Riverina Football Association
