= Ariah Park railway station =

Former railway station in New South Wales, Australia

Ariah Park

General information
- Location: Ariah Park; New South Wales, Australia
- Coordinates: 34°20′38″S 147°13′06″E
- System: Regional rail
- Line: Temora-Roto line

Other information
- Status: Closed

History
- Opened: 1906
- Closed: Unknown

Services
Preceding station	Former services	Following station
Mirrool towards Roto	Temora–Roto Line	Quandary towards Temora
Location

The Ariah Park railway station is a disused railway station on the Temora-Roto railway line in New South Wales, Australia. It opened in 1906 and was the temporary terminus of the line between 1906 and 1908.

A turning triangle was provided behind the platform with various goods facilities and sidings. A timber station building and toilet were provided on the 30-metre-long platform (100 ft), which was later extended to 69 metres (225 ft). Wheat stacking sites were constructed between 1915 and 1918, and Ariah Park is notable as the first location in Australia to despatch wheat in bulk, a memorial on a freight wagon alongside an adjoining road commemorates this. In 1986, the triangle was removed and goods facilities were subsequently closed until Ariah Park became available for wheat loading only in 1994. The railway station was unattended after 1982. The platform was shortened to 24 metres (79 ft) in 1994. The railway station building survives in reasonable condition and was restored and repainted in 2006. There are plans to convert it into a museum.
