= Beckom =

Beckom New South Wales
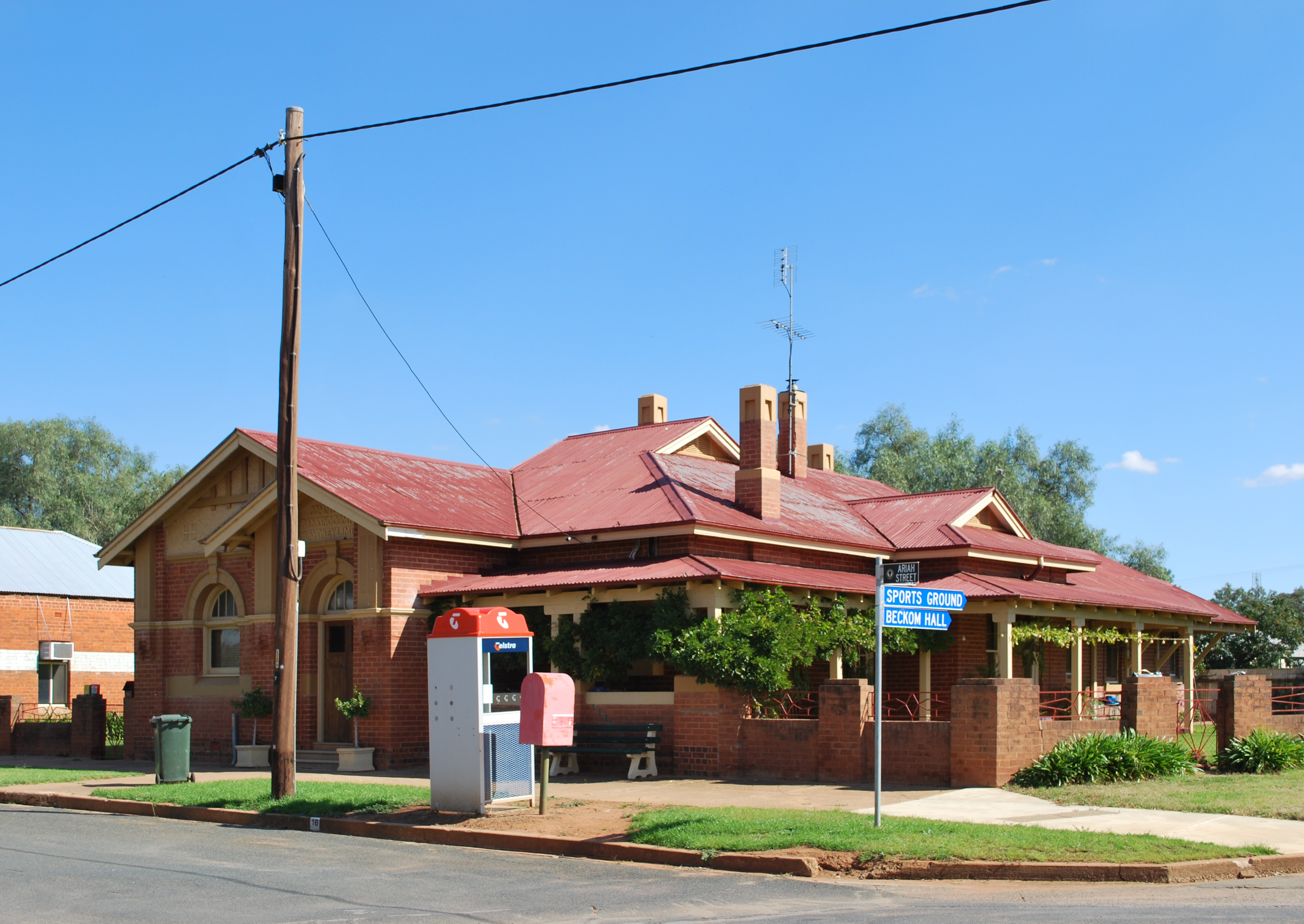
- Former Commercial Banking Company of Sydney branch in Beckom, now a private residence

- Coordinates: 34°20′0″S 146°58′0″E
- Population: 170 (2006 census)
- Established: 1910
- Postcode(s): 2665
- Location: 481 km (299 mi) SW of Sydney; 90 km (56 mi) E of Griffith; 16 km (10 mi) S of Mirrool; 9 km (6 mi) N of Ardlethan
- LGA(s): Coolamon Shire Council
- County: Bourke
- State electorate(s): Cootamundra
- Federal division(s): Riverina

Beckom is a village in the central part of the Riverina. It is about 7 kilometres north-east of Ardlethan, and situated about 90 kilometres (56 mi) east of Griffith. It had a population of 170 people on the 2006 Census night. The town was established with the opening of the railway line in 1908. Passenger services ceased in 1983 and the station closed in 1985 however the line remains open for goods trains.

Beckom Post Office opened on 4 January 1909 and closed in 1993.

== History ==
Beckom takes its name from a settler's wife P 342 Inform., from the Royal Australian Historical Society Journal Vol. 8 Supplement.

== Gallery ==
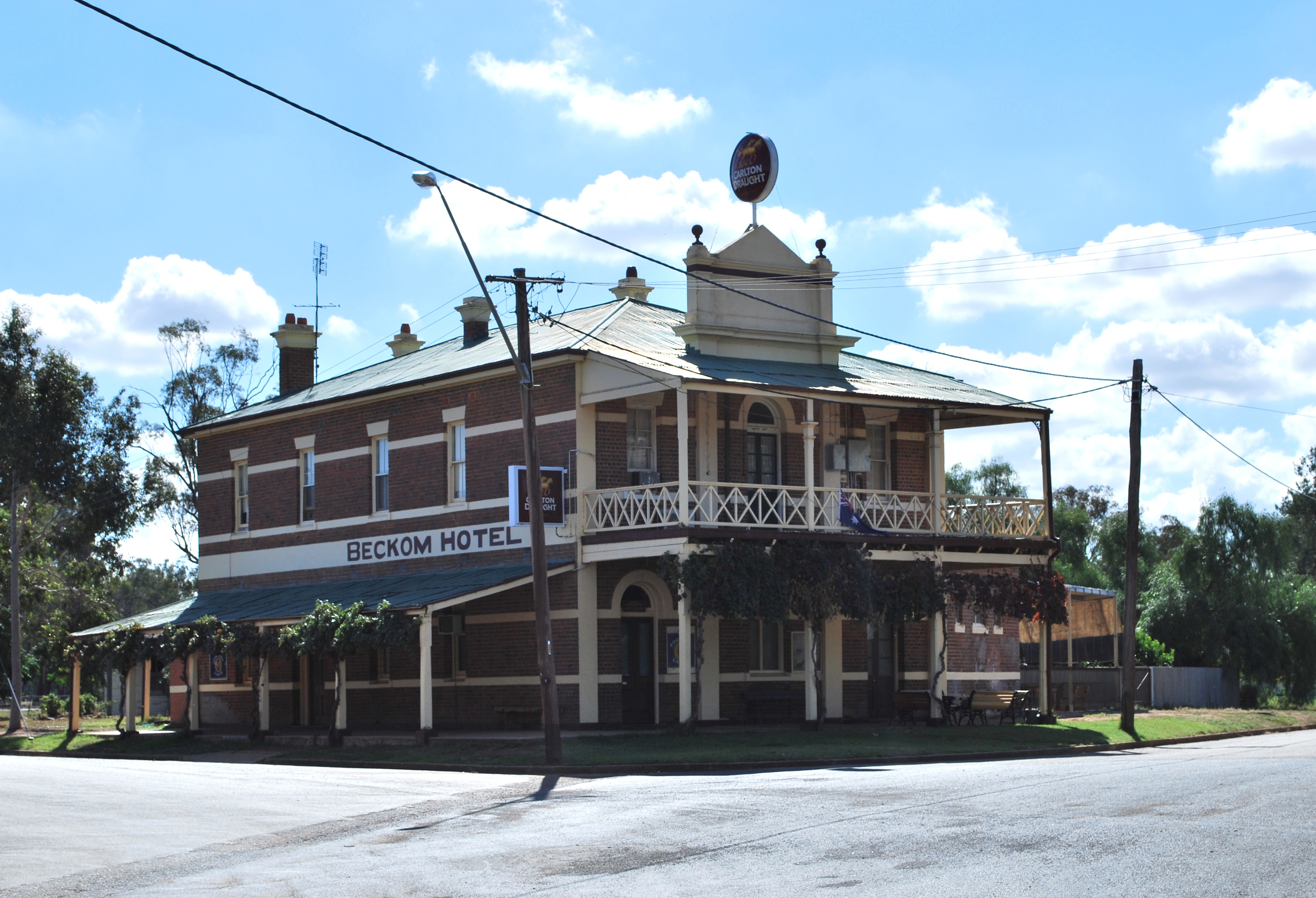
Beckom Hotel

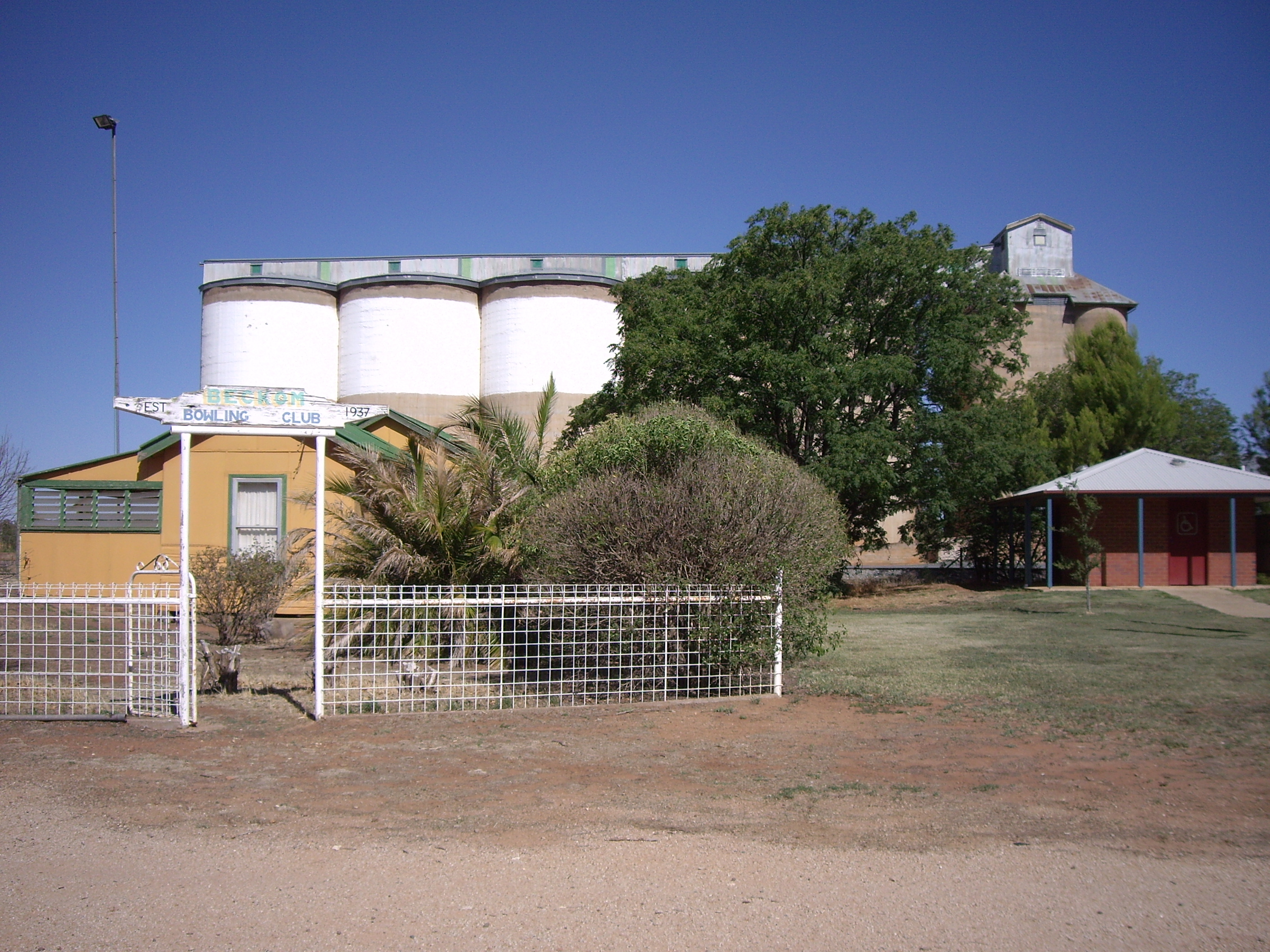
Beckom Bowling Club with silos in the distance

== Notes and references ==
Preceding station	Former services	Following station
Ardlethan towards Roto	Temora–Roto Line	Mirrool towards Temora
