= Garoolgan, New South Wales =

Town in New South Wales, Australia

Coordinates: 34°15′S 146°27′E

Garoolgan is the location of a closed railway station and silo on the Temora- Roto railway line in the Riverina of New South Wales, Australia. A passenger station was located at the site between 1916 and 1975. The line remains open for goods traffic.

| Preceding station | Former services | Following station |
|---|---|---|
| Binya towards Roto | Temora–Roto Line | Barellan towards Temora |
