= Wade High School =

Griffith High School

Location
- Griffith, Riverina, New South Wales; Australia; 34°16′53″S 146°4′14″E

Information
- Type: Government-funded co-educational comprehensive secondary day school
- Established: 1971
- Status: Closed
- Closed: December 2018 (Merged with Griffith High School to form Murrumbidgee Regional High School)

Wade High School was a government-funded co-educational comprehensive secondary day school, located in Griffith, in the Riverina region of New South Wales, Australia.

Established in 1971, the school closed in December 2018 when it merged with the Griffith High School to form Murrumbidgee Regional High School. The school was operated by the NSW Department of Education.

== Overview ==
Established in 1971 as Griffith's second high school, prior to its closure, Wade High School had an enrolment of approximately 720 students and 63 staff. Half of its students came from the East Griffith/Driver/Collina area, with the main feeder school being Griffith East Public School. The remainder of the students came from farming areas and smaller places including Yenda, Yoogali, Rankins Springs, Beelbangera, Bilbul, and Binya. Many students spent a great deal of time travelling to and from school each day, especially those in the Rankins Springs area.

Years seven and eight were part of the middle school group, years nine and ten the school certificate group, and years eleven and twelve the senior school when preliminary and NSW higher school certificate courses were completed. Students with satisfactory attendance and progress received their school certificate at the end of year ten and their HSC at the end of year twelve.

== Facilities ==
The school featured two fully renovated kitchens for food, technology and hospitality, a large enclosed hall used for indoor sports and gatherings and two computer rooms, one with iMacs approximately 30 IBM computers, each with 1GB of RAM and Pentium 4 3.2 GHz processors, and a further small computer room conjoined with the music rooms for multimedia fitted with four eMacs (original version). The school library, which was used for school related work on Tuesdays and Wednesday, also contained IBM computers with each named after an author. After a fire, the school's B Block was renovated. 15 new class rooms were built – each with new equipment and refrigerated air conditioning. The F Block contained seven classrooms that were also fitted with refrigerated air conditioning. The school's outdoor sporting facilities included two soccer fields, six netball courts, two basketball courts, and two cricket pitches.

== Sporting ==
Wade High School hosted annual swimming and athletics carnivals. The swimming carnival was held early in term one at the Griffith Aquatic Centre and the athletics carnival was held in term three at the West End Oval. The school's students were divided into four houses for these carnivals and points were given to each house based on student participation and placement in each event. The four sporting houses of Bradman, Fraser, Laver and McKay were named after Australian sportspeople. High performing students could progress to regional, zone and state carnivals after the school carnivals.

Wade High and Griffith High School hosted the Nugan Shield every year, which consisted of a series of sporting events.

Wade High was very successful in the sporting area, including:

- The Bill Turner Soccer Cup – won the Riverina area of the competition in 2007, 2008 and 2013 before losing to the South Coast winner in the next round in the first two years and the Victorian winner in 2013.
- The Bill Turner Soccer Trophy – the girls won the Riverina area in 2012 and progressed to the quarter finals where they lost to the eventual competition finalists. They have twice been area runners up as well.

== Notable alumni ==
- Alex Blackwell – cricket player; represented Australian Women's Cricket Team
- Kate Blackwell – cricket player; represented Australian Women's Cricket Team

== See also ==
- List of government schools in New South Wales
- List of schools in the Riverina
- Education in Australia
