= Kamarah, New South Wales =

Kamarah
- Town
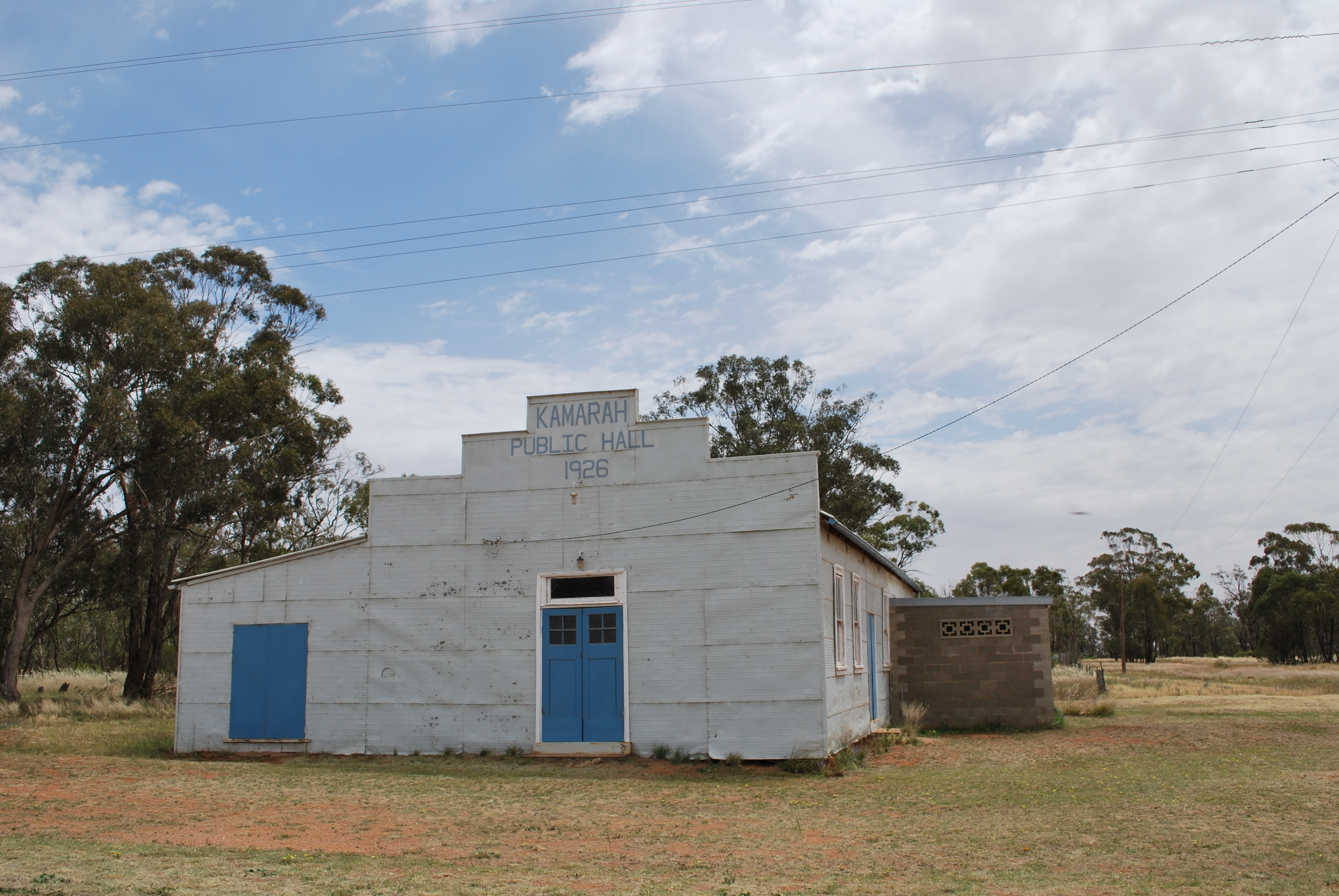
- Kamarah public hall

- Coordinates: 34°22′5″S 146°45′39″E
- Country: Australia
- State: New South Wales
- LGA: Narrandera Shire
- Location: 508 km (316 mi) SW of Sydney; 77 km (48 mi) E of Griffith; 77 km (48 mi) E of Narrandera; 13 km (8.1 mi) w of Ardlethan

Government
  - State electorate: Murrumbidgee
  - Federal divisions: Farrer; Parkes
- Elevation: 189 m (620 ft)

Population
  - Total: 83 (SAL 2021)
- Postcode: 2665
- County: Cooper

Kamarah, is a village community in the central north part of the Riverina. It is situated by road, about 11 kilometres west of Ardlethan and 12 kilometres east of Moombooldool. At the 2006 census, Kamarah had a population of 130 people.

Kamarah was previously named By Goo. Its current name comes from the local Aboriginal word for 'sleep'.

Bygoo Post Office opened on 2 December 1910, was renamed Kamarah next year and closed in 1986.

The railway line opened in 1908. The station closed in 1975, however the line remains open for goods trains.

== Notes and references ==
Preceding station	Former services	Following station
Moombooldool towards Roto	Temora–Roto Line	Ardlethan towards Temora
