= Moombooldool, New South Wales =

Moombooldool New South Wales
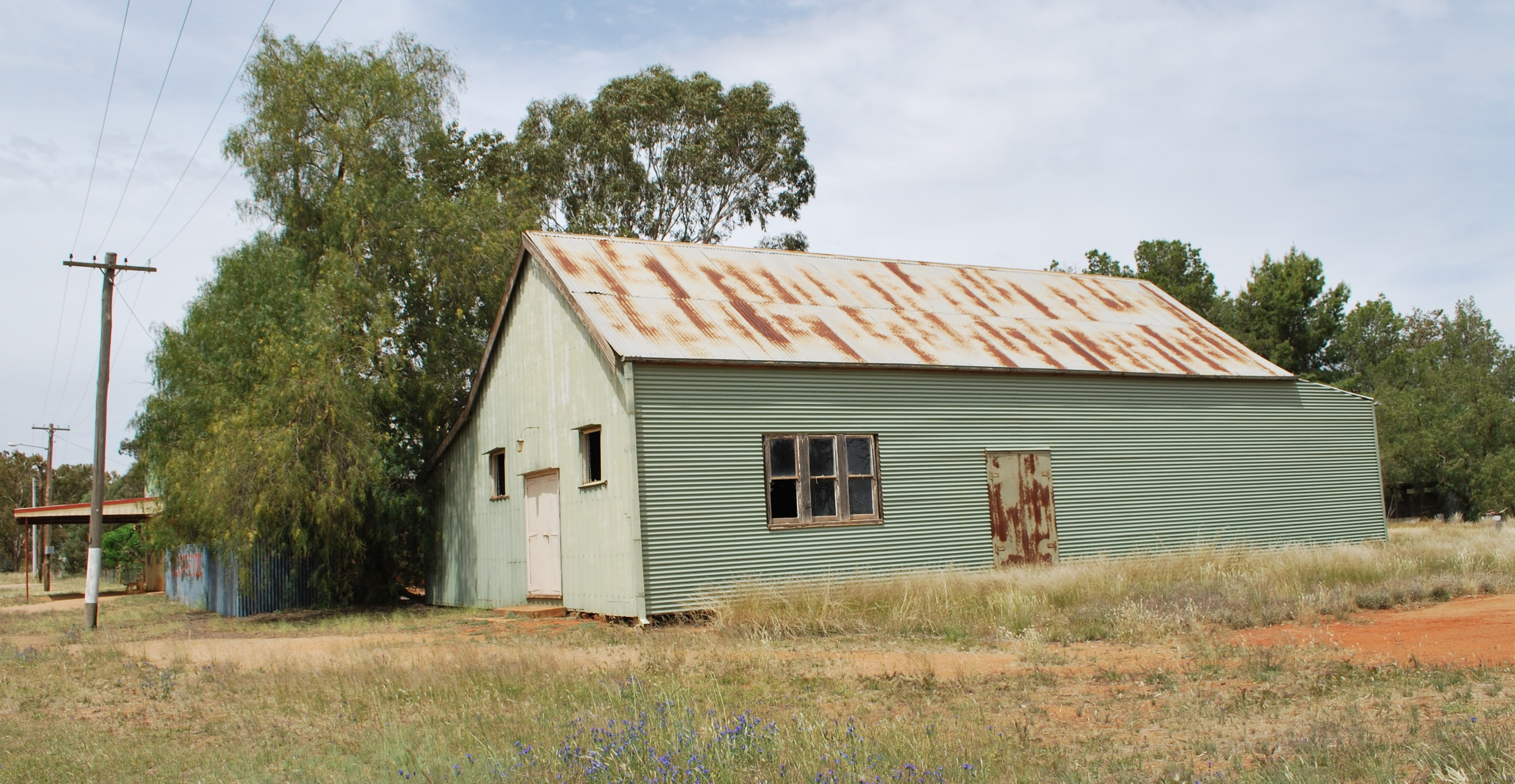
- Public hall at Moombooldool

- Coordinates: 34°18′6″S 146°40′41″E
- Population: 26 (SAL 2021)
- Postcode(s): 2665
- Elevation: 158 m (518 ft)
- Location: 511 km (318 mi) SW of Sydney; 503 km (313 mi) N of Melbourne; 62 km (39 mi) E of Griffith; 68 km (42 mi) N of Narrandera; 10 km (6 mi) E of Barellan
- LGA(s): Narrandera Shire
- Region: Riverina
- County: Cooper
- State electorate(s): Cootamundra
- Federal division(s): Farrer

Moombooldool is a village community in the central north part of the Riverina, located on the Burley Griffin Way (B94). It is situated by road, about 9 kilometres east of Barellan and 12 kilometres west of Kamarah. The village is also equally 420 kilometres distant from both Sydney and Melbourne as the crow flies.

Moombooldool Post Office opened on 15 April 1912 and closed in 1982. The railway line opened in 1908. The station closed in 1975 however the line remains open for goods trains.

== Notes and references ==
Preceding station	Former services	Following station
Barellan towards Roto	Temora–Roto Line	Kamarah towards Temora
