= Binya =

- Town
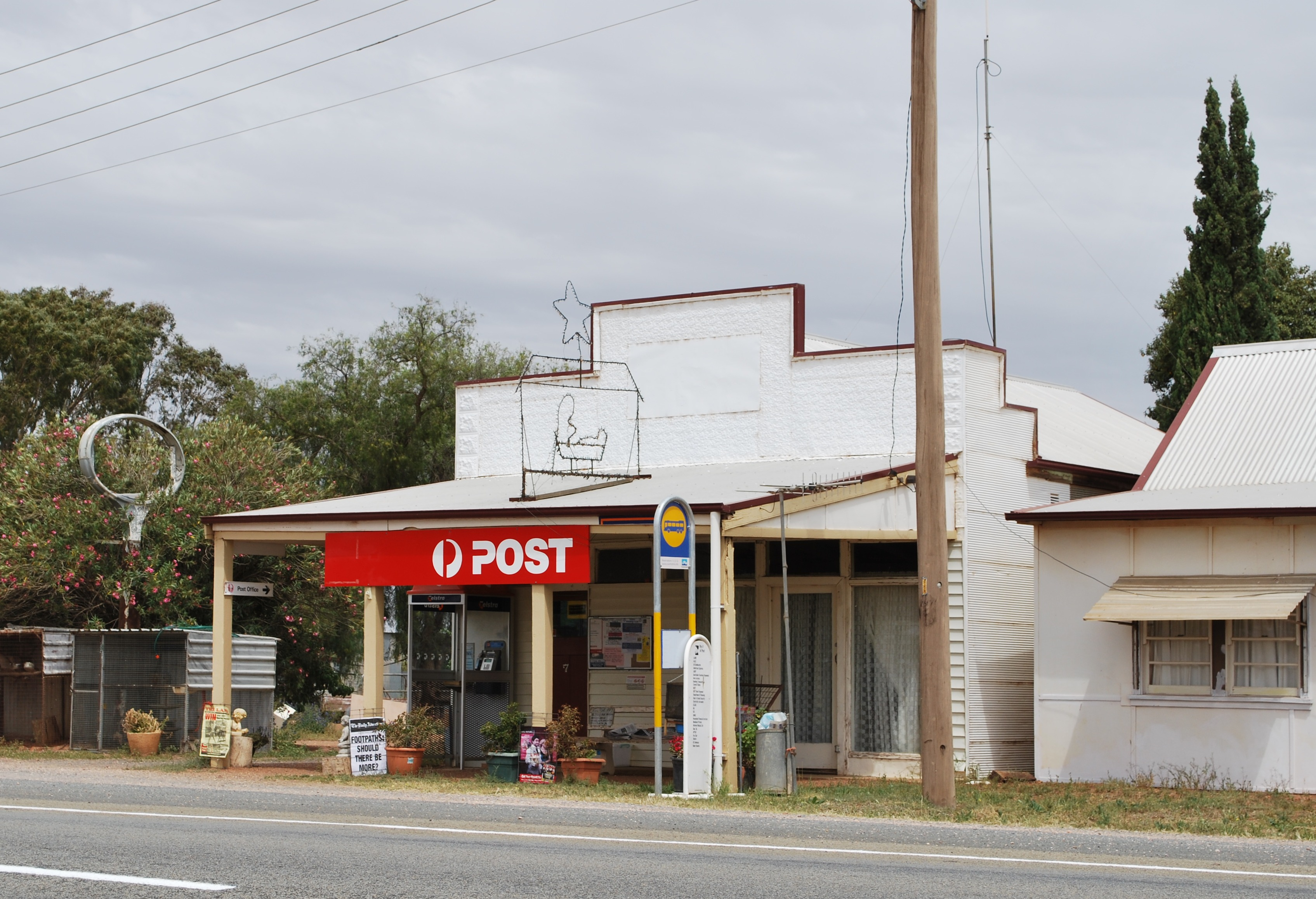
- The General Store and Post Office at Binya

- Coordinates: 34°13′46″S 146°20′52″E
- Country: Australia
- State: New South Wales
- LGA: Narrandera Shire
- Location: 543 km (337 mi) from Sydney; 30 km (19 mi) from Griffith; 23 km (14 mi) from Barellan; 14 km (8.7 mi) from Yenda

Government
  - State electorate: Cootamundra
  - Federal division: Farrer

Population
  - Total: 191 (2011 census)
- Postcode: 2665
- County: Cooper

Binya is a farming community in the centre of the Riverina area of New South Wales, Australia. The village is situated about 30 kilometres (19 mi) east of Griffith along Burley Griffin Way, heading in the direction of Ardlethan.

== Facilities and services ==
The Temora–Roto railway line opened in 1916. Passenger services ceased in 1983 and the railway station closed in 1985. However the line remains open for goods trains.

The Binya post office was opened on 19 June 1916.

== Sport ==
Binya Football Club won the Griffith Football Association premiership, defeating Griffith in the grand final. The Binya Football Club (Australian Rules Football) won five successive premierships from 1934 to 1938 in the Barellan Ardlethan Football League.

== Demography ==
Like many rural localities in the area, the population has progressively declined over a number of years, evidenced as follows:

Selected historical census data for Binya state suburb
Census year		2001	2006	2011
Population	Estimated residents on Census night	unavailable	238	191

== See also ==
- Sandy Creek (Mirrool)

Preceding station	Former services	Following station
Yenda towards Roto	Temora–Roto Line	Garoolgan towards Temora
