= Mirrool Creek =

Mirrool Merool
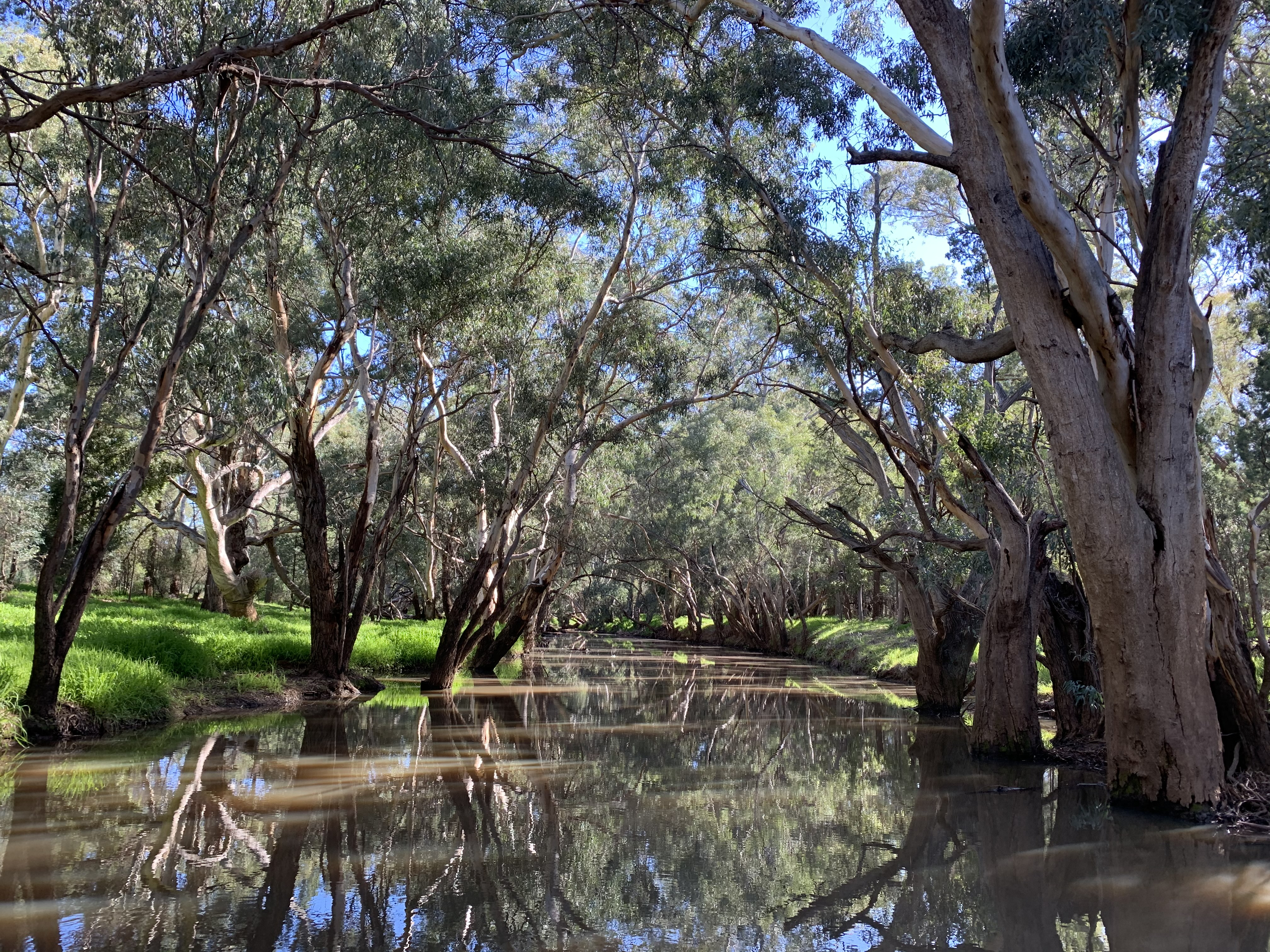

- Location of Mirrool Creek mouth in New South Wales
- Etymology: Aboriginal: pipeclay

Location
- Country: Australia
- State: New South Wales
- Region: Riverina (IBRA)
- LGAs: Bland, Griffith, Carrathool, Hay
- Town: Mirrool, Ardlethan, Griffith

Physical characteristics
- Source: Great Dividing Range
  - location: west by south of Temora
  - coordinates: 34°27′56″S 147°23′57″E
  - elevation: 304 m (997 ft)
- Mouth: Lachlan River
  - location: northwest of Hay
  - coordinates: 34°24′S 144°53′E
  - elevation: 84 m (276 ft)
- Length: 264 km (164 mi)

Basin features
- River system: Murrumbidgee catchment, Murray–Darling basin
- Tributaries
  - left: Yarranjerry Creek, Little Mirrool Creek
  - right: Mandamah Creek, Kildary Creek, Bolaro Creek, Wah Wah No 9 Channel

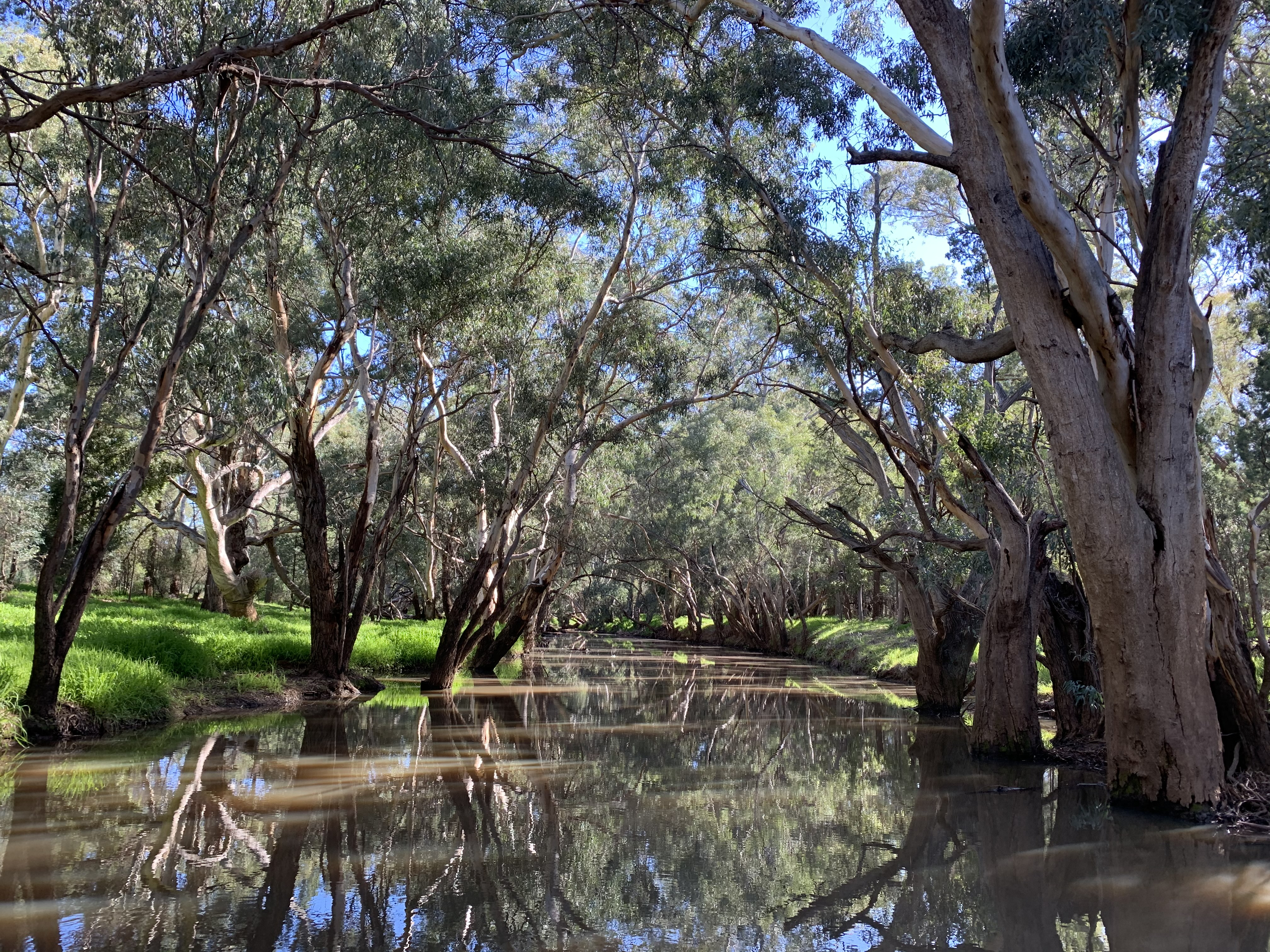
Mirrool Creek at Ardlethan, NSW

Mirrool Creek, a watercourse that is part of the Lachlan sub-catchment of the Murrumbidgee catchment in the Murray–Darling basin, is in the Riverina region of New South Wales, Australia. The course of the Mirrool Creek is indefinite at various locations.

== Course and features ==
Mirrool Creek (technically a river) rises in the Ingalba Nature Reserve, about 15 kilometres (9.3 mi) west by south of the town of Temora, sourced by runoff from the Great Dividing Range. The creek flows generally north northwest, west, north by west, and west again for approximately 115 kilometres (71 mi), joined by four minor tributaries, before becoming indefinite approximately 3 kilometres (1.9 mi) south southwest of Barellan. The Mirrool Creek rises again approximately 20 kilometres (12 mi) east of Griffith and flows for approximately 75 kilometres (47 mi) west southwest, and to the south of Yenda, Bilbul, Hanwood and Griffith, before heading northwest by north and flowing into the Barren Box Swamp, where the creek does not drain above the land surface. The Mirrool Creek rises again southwest of the village of Goolgowi and flows west and then west southwest, joined by one minor tributary, before reaching its confluence with the Lachlan River, north northwest of the town of Hay. The creek descends 191 metres (627 ft) over the entire 264-kilometre (164 mi) course.

The creek is crossed by the Newell Highway at the locality of Mirrool and at the town of Ardlethan; the Kidman Way south of Hanwood and north of Darlington Point; the Mid-Western Highway northeast of Hay; and the Cobb Highway northwest of Hay.

== See also ==
- List of rivers of New South Wales (L-Z)
- Rivers of New South Wales
