= Coelli =

Coelli is an Italian surname. Notable people with the surname include:

- Michael Coelli, Australian economist
- Rod Coelli (born 1955), Australian footballer
