= Pucawan railway station =

Former railway station in New South Wales, Australia

Coordinates: 34.3972°S 147.3517°E

Pucawan was a railway station on the Temora- Roto railway line in New South Wales, Australia. It opened in 1905 as Linton after a local property, changing its name to Pucawan (aboriginal for native bear) in 1914. A timber station building and toilet were provided on the 100-foot-long (30 m) platform. In 1927, the existing large concrete grain silo opened, and in 1964 a steel bulkhead storage opened. In its hey-day, Pucawan featured a weigh-bridge, sheep loading facility, passing loop and good siding. CHP rail-motors operated between Temora and Griffith. All facilities were progressively removed from the 1960s, with the closure of the station to passenger services in 1975, the removal of the station buildings in 1977, the closure of the passing loop and removal of the good siding in 1985.

Preceding station	Former services	Following station
Quandary towards Roto	Temora–Roto Line	Temora Terminus
