= Quandary railway station =

Former railway station in New South Wales, Australia

Coordinates: 34.3854°S 147.3132°E

Quandary was a railway station on the Temora–Roto railway line in New South Wales, Australia. It opened in 1905 as Beaconsfield changing its name to Quandary in 1907 after a large local pastoral holding. A larger timber station building than adjacent stations, and toilet were provided on the 100-foot-long (30 m) platform. In 1931, the existing large concrete grain silo opened, and in the 1960s a steel bulkhead storage opened. CPH passenger rail-motors operated between Temora and Griffith. All facilities were progressively removed from the 1960s, with the closure of the station to passenger services in 1975 and the removal of the station buildings and passing loop in 1985. The grain silos and loading facilities remain, however there is now no trace of the station.

Preceding station	Former services	Following station
Ariah Park towards Roto	Temora–Roto Line	Pucawan towards Temora
