= Beelbangera =

Beelbangera New South Wales
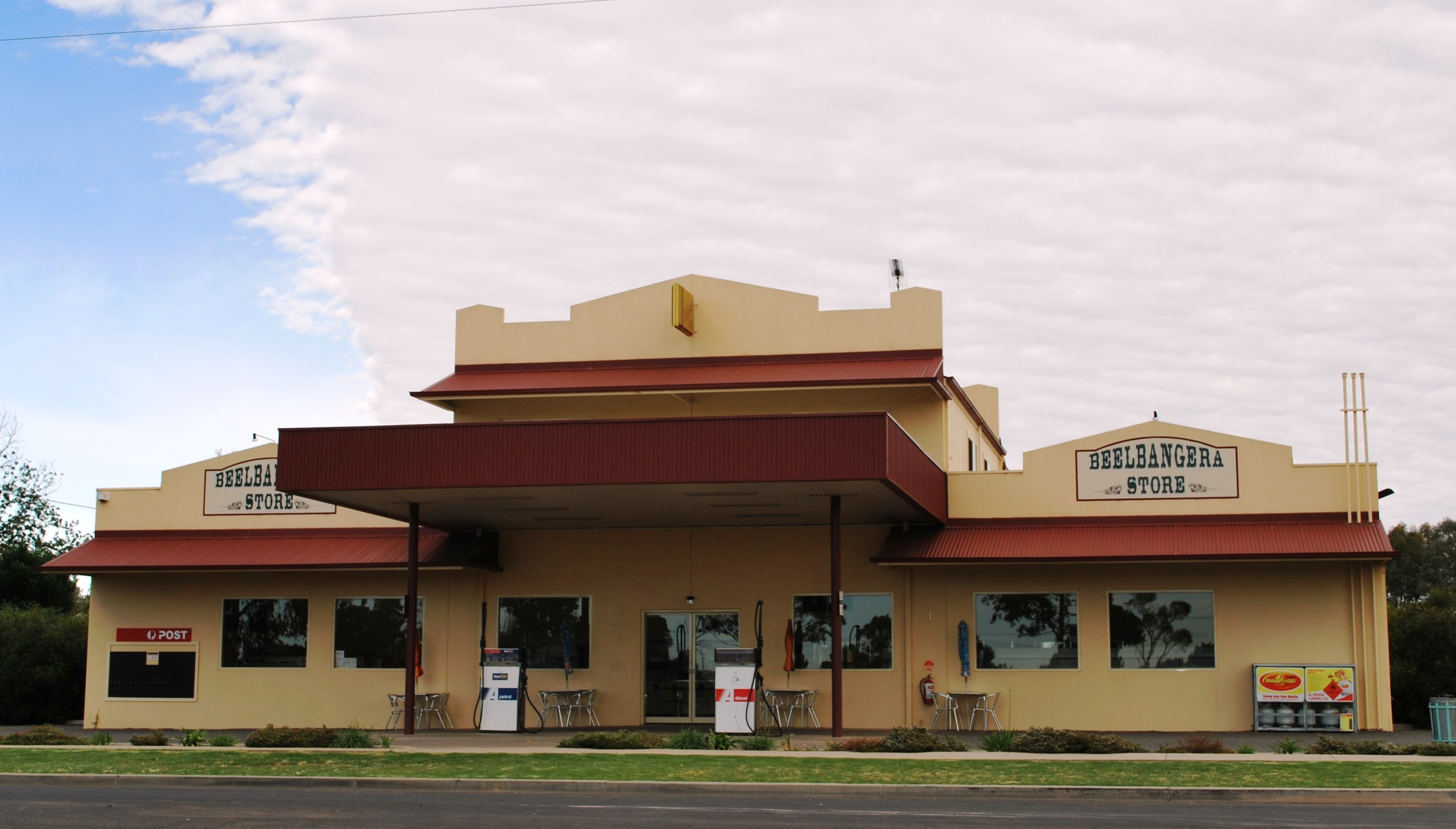
- General store at Beelbangera

- Coordinates: 34°16′0″S 146°6′0″E
- Population: 358 (2021 census)
- Postcode(s): 2680
- Location: 567 km (352 mi) from Sydney; 195 km (121 mi) from Wagga Wagga; 7 km (4 mi) from Yenda; 2 km (1 mi) from Griffith
- LGA(s): City of Griffith
- County: Cooper
- State electorate(s): Murray
- Federal division(s): Farrer

Beelbangera is a town in the north west of the Riverina and situated about 2 kilometres north-east of Griffith and about 7 kilometres south-west of Yenda. At the 2021 census Beelbangera had a population of 358.

The place name Beelbangera is derived from the local Aboriginal word meaning "native companion".

Beelbangera Post Office opened on 1 September 1919.

== Notes and references ==
Preceding station	Former services	Following station
Griffith towards Roto	Temora–Roto Line	Yenda towards Temora
