= Tharbogang =

Tharbogang New South Wales
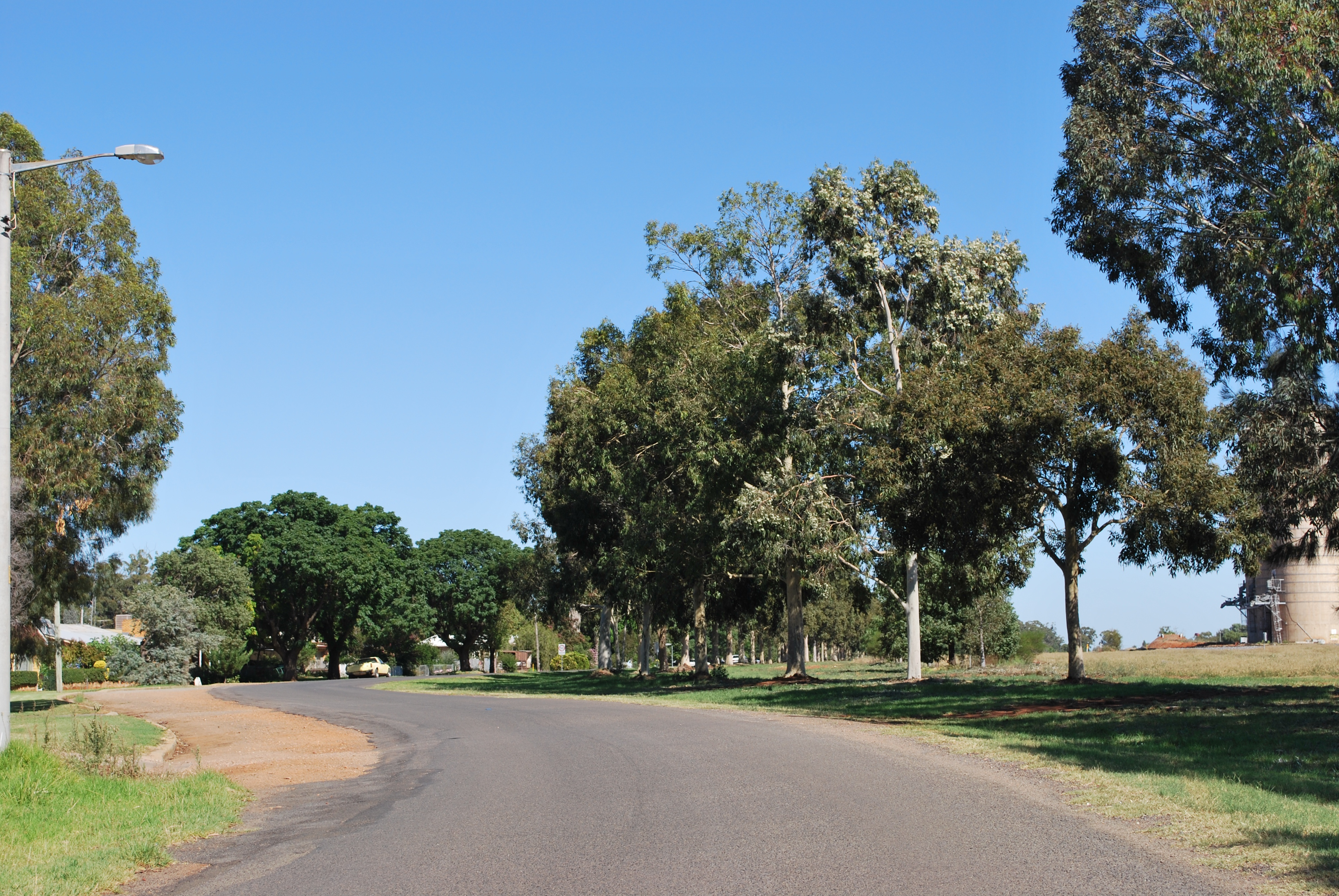
- Dunn St in Tharbogang

- Coordinates: 34°15′0″S 145°59′0″E
- Population: 452 (SAL 2021)
- Postcode(s): 2680
- Location: 580 km (360 mi) W of Sydney; 8 km (5 mi) NW of Griffith
- LGA(s): City of Griffith
- State electorate(s): Murray
- Federal division(s): Farrer

Tharbogang (/ˈtɑːboʊɡəŋ/ TAH-boh-gəng) is a village and rural locality in the Riverina region of southwest New South Wales, Australia. The village is in the City of Griffith local government area and on the Kidman Way, 8 kilometres (5.0 mi) north west of the centre of Griffith and 580 kilometres (360 mi) west of the state capital, Sydney.

At the 2011 census, Tharbogang and the surrounding rural area had a population of 676.

Warburn Estate is a winemaker in Tharbogang and is the maker of Gossips, a Cabernet Merlot among other wines

Tharbogang is a former station on the Temora–Roto railway line.

Preceding station	Former services	Following station
Lakeview towards Roto	Temora–Roto Line	Tabbita towards Temora
