= Yenda =

- Town
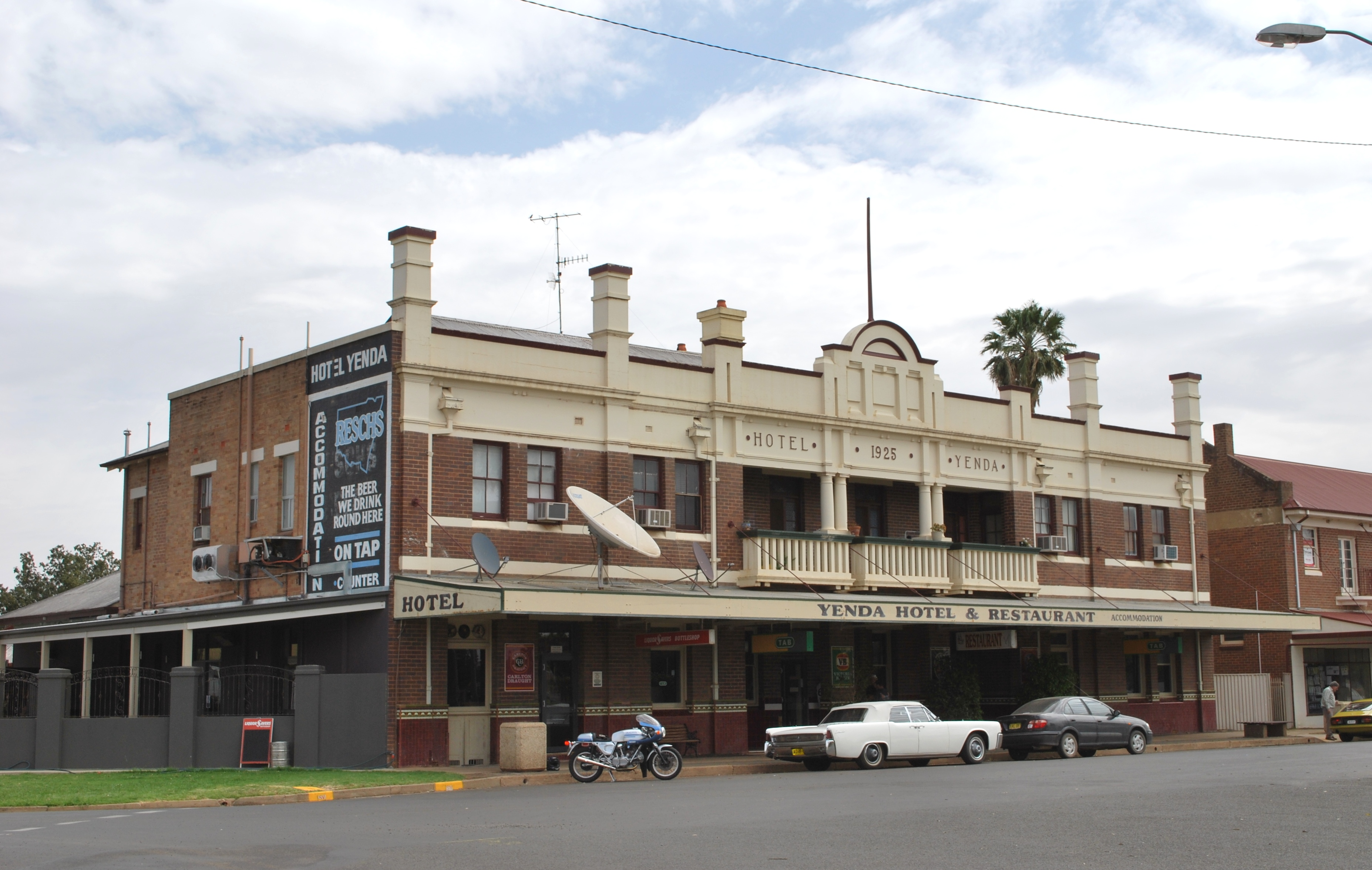
- Yenda Hotel and Restaurant

- Coordinates: 34°15′0″S 146°10′15″E
- Country: Australia
- State: New South Wales
- LGA: City of Griffith
- Location: 557 km (346 mi) SW of Sydney; 16 km (9.9 mi) E of Griffith

Government
  - State electorate: Murray
  - Federal division: Farrer
- Elevation: 129 m (423 ft)

Population
  - Total: 1,503 (2011 census)
- Postcode: 2681
- County: Cooper
- Mean max temp: 23.6 °C (74.5 °F)
- Mean min temp: 9.8 °C (49.6 °F)
- Annual rainfall: 419.7 mm (16.52 in)

Yenda is a town in the Riverina district of New South Wales, Australia. The town is located about 16 kilometres (9.9 mi) east of Griffith, 65 kilometres (40 mi) north-west of Narrandera, and 550 kilometres (340 mi) west of Sydney in the Murrumbidgee Irrigation Area of southern New South Wales. Although most of the original 15-acre farms have been consolidated into large vineyards and most farmhouses have disappeared, farm roads are named after the original settlers. In 1940 Yenda had two clothing stores, two bakers, two butchers, two grocery stores, two barbers, one newsagency, one pharmacy, one cinema, one Greek restaurant and one bank but residents now do their shopping in nearby Griffith. At the 2011 census, Yenda had a population of 1,503.

The area forming part of Yenda is well covered by vineyards, which produce close to 70% of the wine for New South Wales. Also, there are rice paddies, fed by the irrigation system, orchards producing stone and citrus fruit, poultry farms and market gardens producing vegetables. Casella Family Brands, who produce both Peter Lehmann Wines and yellow tail, are based in the town.

Nearby is the 8,360-hectare (20,700-acre) Cocoparra National Park, containing waterfalls, gorges and bush walks and providing a home to over 150 species of birds.

The Yenda railway station, opened in 1916, lies on the Temora–Roto railway line and is now closed. Yenda Post Office opened somewhat later on 1 July 1919.

Yenda Brewery was founded in 2014 and is located on Farm 1471, Wakley Road, Yenda. They produce Pressman's cider and a range of beers under a variety of labels. The company was in 2020 owned by Coca-Cola Amatil and Casella Family Brands.

== Sports ==
Yenda is home to the Yenda Blueheelers Rugby League Club, who play at Wade Park and compete in the Group 20 Rugby League competition.

Yenda Tigers junior soccer club is also based in the town, playing in the Griffith Football Association.

== Gallery ==
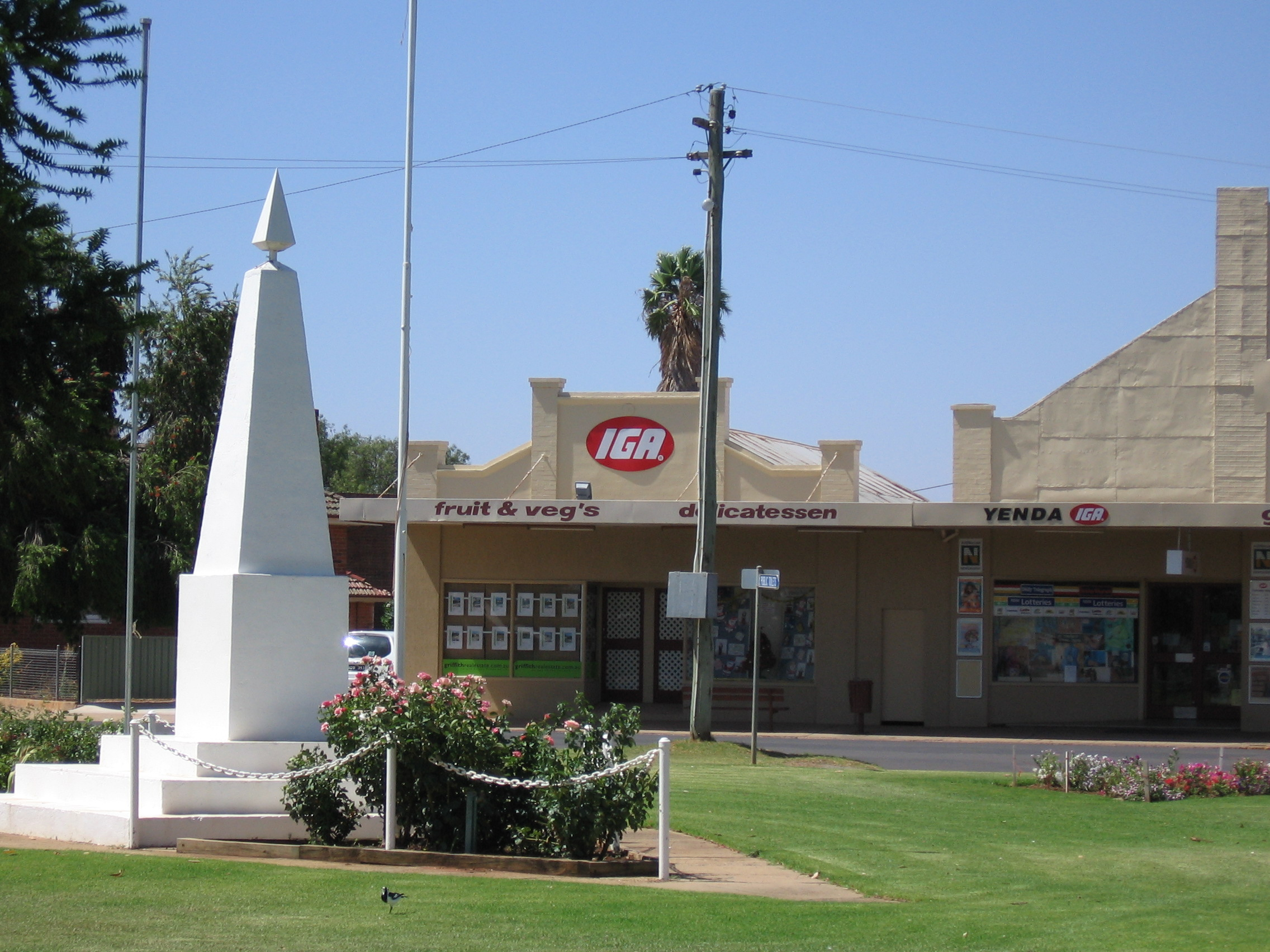
The Memorial Park at Yenda, with the IGA supermarket in the background.

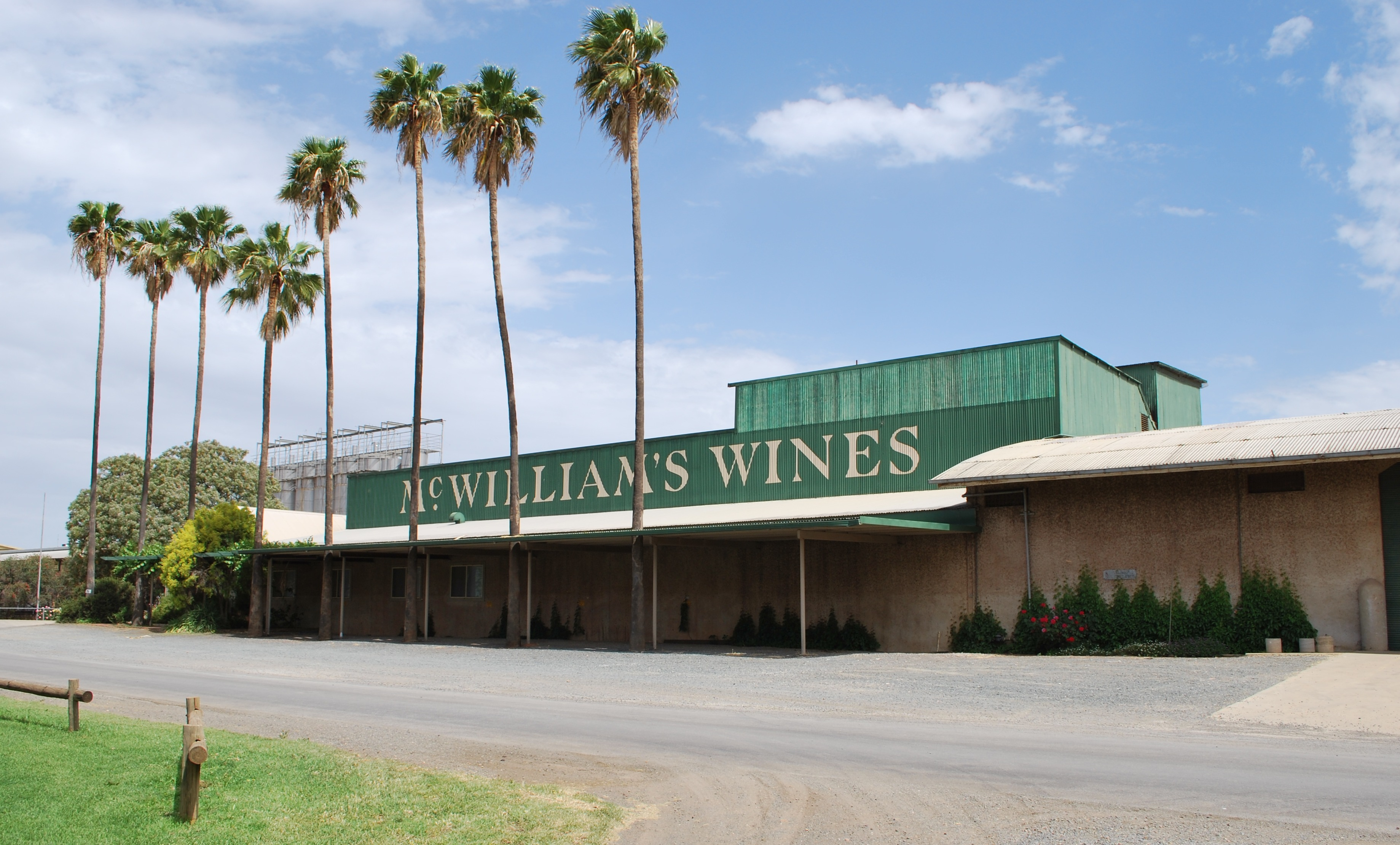
McWilliam's Wines

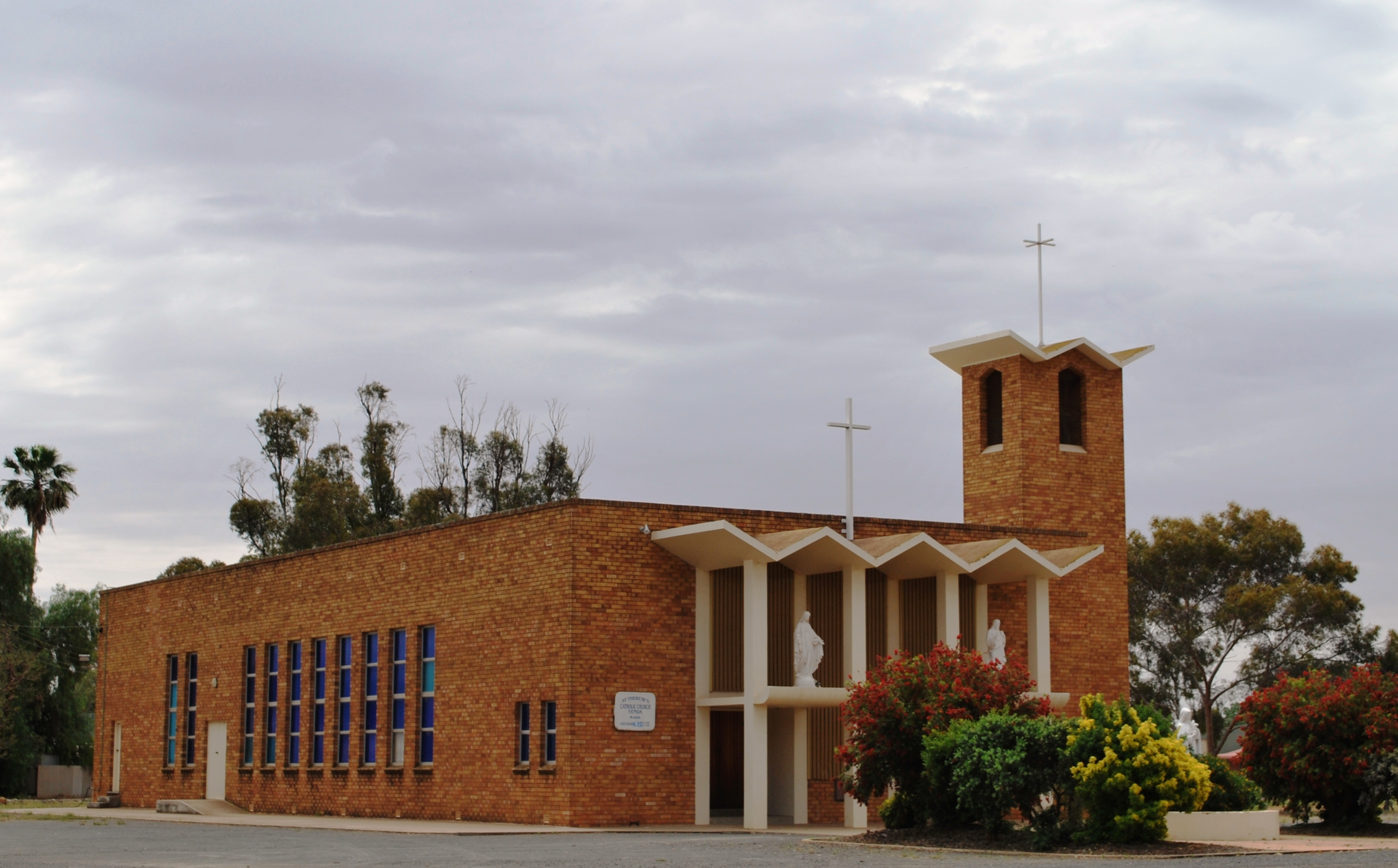
St Therese's Roman Catholic Church

Preceding station	Former services	Following station
Beelbangera towards Roto	Temora–Roto Line	Binya towards Temora
