= Griffith High School =

Griffith High School may refer to:

- Griffith High School (Indiana), in Griffith, Indiana, USA
- Griffith High School (New South Wales, Australia), in Griffith, Riverina, New South Wales, Australia

== See also ==
- Griffin School (disambiguation)
