= Ardlethan =

- Town
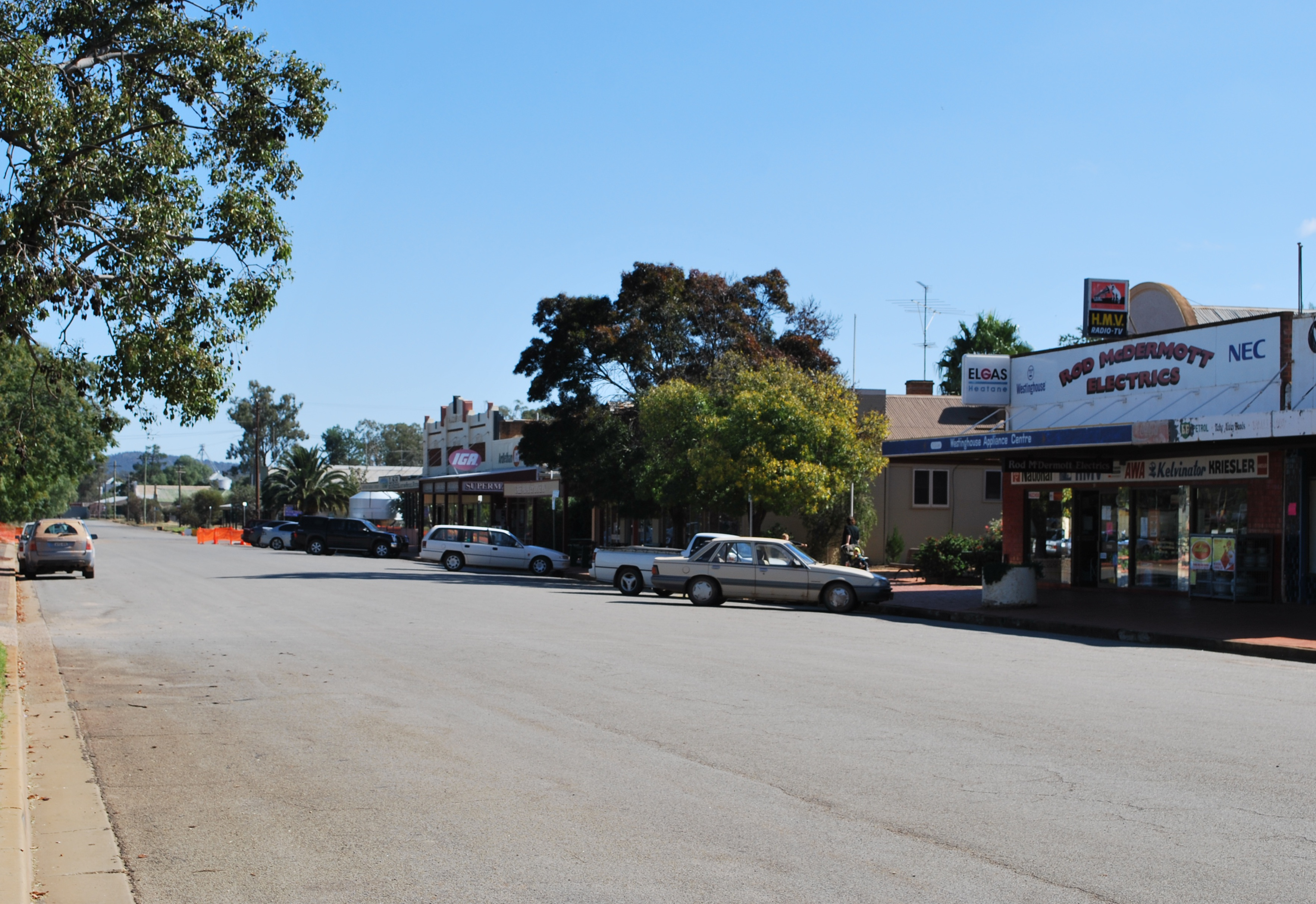
- Ariah Street, the main street of Ardlethan

- Coordinates: 34°21′0″S 146°54′0″E
- Country: Australia
- State: New South Wales
- LGA: Coolamon Shire Council
- Location: 489 km (304 mi) SW of Sydney; 103 km (64 mi) NW of Wagga Wagga; 15 km (9.3 mi) E of Kamarah; 9 km (5.6 mi) S of Beckom

Government
  - State electorate: Cootamundra
  - Federal divisions: Riverina; Farrer; Parkes
- Elevation: 204 m (669 ft)

Population
  - Total: 472 (2021 census)
- Postcode: 2665
- County: Bourke
- Mean max temp: 23.0 °C (73.4 °F)
- Mean min temp: 9.2 °C (48.6 °F)
- Annual rainfall: 481.8 mm (18.97 in)

Ardlethan (/ɑːrdˈliːθən/) is a small service town in the Coolamon Shire in New South Wales, Australia. Ardlethan is at the intersection of the Burley Griffin Way and Newell Highway.

Ardlethan is referred to as the "Home of the Kelpie". It was in the area that the original kelpie dog reared her first young, founding the breed. That dog was born near the town of Casterton, Victoria, which holds the title "Birthplace of the Kelpie".

== History ==
Ardlethan was established in the 19th century after gold was discovered but gold mining was short-lived. The railway line opened in 1908. Passenger services ceased in 1983, but the line remains open for goods trains.

Warri Post Office opened on 1 October 1907 and was renamed Ardlethan in 1908.

Tin mining began in 1912, and became an economic backbone of the town. A major labour strike in the 1930s gained national coverage. The open cut pit was at one time the largest in the Southern Hemisphere, and is located approximately 5 kilometres North West of the township. Mining eventually went underground and continued through to the late 1980s. The tin mine was reopened in late 2001, particularly for alluvial mining, but closed in mid-2004 after Marlborough Resources was placed under voluntary administration due to disappointing results at its new processing plant, poor tin price hedging results, and lower-than-expected tin reserves. Australian Tin Resources Pty Ltd (ATR) now owns the mine. As at 24 January 2019 ATR had received Development Application consent from Coolamon Shire Council for a Rehabilitation and Tailings Reprocessing Project on the site. They intend to first carry out small scale pilot plant processing operations on site for about 2–3 months to prove up the processing technology, before increasing the scale of the operations.

== Sport ==
The town used to have a rugby league team, which was formed in 1923, but the most popular sport in Ardlethan is Australian rules football, as it lies in the narrow 'canola belt', a geographical triangle stretching from the Grong Grong and Marrar at either end of the Canola Way, to Lake Cargelligo in which Australian football retains a strong following, despite being in the rugby league supporting state of New South Wales.

In 1930 Ardlethan Rugby League Club won the Walton Shield with a win against Rankins Springs.

Ardlethan Football Club

The Ardlethan Football Club was formed in 1912 and initially played in the Barellan & District Football Association.

The Barellan & Ardlethan Football Association was formed in 1914 and played in this competition in 1915, then the club went into recess between 1916 and 1918, due to World War I.

The club was reformed in 1919 and played in the Barellan & Becktom Football Association from 1919 to 1921.

From 1927 to 1928 Ardlethan played in the Ariah Park & District Australian Rules Football Association.

In 1935 the Barellan & Ardlethan Football League was formed.

Ardlethan FC won the 1952 Barellan Football Association premiership, defeating Kamarah at Barellan, wearing a black and white jumper.

The Ardlethan Football Club played in the South West Football League (New South Wales) from 1956 to 1981 and initially wore a jumper featuring three vertical stripes, red, black and gold.

The club then joined the Riverina Football League in 1982, then joined the Farrer Football League in 1987.

In 2004 Ardlethan and Ariah Park - Mirrool merged to form the Northern Jets Football Club and still competes in the Farrer Football League.

== Population ==
472 people in Ardlethan as of 2021.

== Climate ==
Climate data for Ardlethan Post Office
Month	Jan	Feb	Mar	Apr	May	Jun	Jul	Aug	Sep	Oct	Nov	Dec	Year
Record high °C (°F)	44.4 (111.9)	44.4 (111.9)	39.4 (102.9)	32.2 (90.0)	27.0 (80.6)	23.8 (74.8)	25.9 (78.6)	25.6 (78.1)	33.9 (93.0)	35.0 (95.0)	39.0 (102.2)	42.7 (108.9)	44.4 (111.9)
Mean daily maximum °C (°F)	32.3 (90.1)	31.1 (88.0)	28.7 (83.7)	23.3 (73.9)	18.0 (64.4)	14.7 (58.5)	14.1 (57.4)	15.6 (60.1)	19.2 (66.6)	22.7 (72.9)	25.9 (78.6)	30.5 (86.9)	23.0 (73.4)
Mean daily minimum °C (°F)	16.3 (61.3)	16.4 (61.5)	13.5 (56.3)	9.4 (48.9)	6.1 (43.0)	3.3 (37.9)	2.7 (36.9)	3.6 (38.5)	5.8 (42.4)	8.8 (47.8)	10.6 (51.1)	13.9 (57.0)	9.2 (48.6)
Record low °C (°F)	6.0 (42.8)	6.7 (44.1)	3.3 (37.9)	−0.6 (30.9)	−3.3 (26.1)	−4.4 (24.1)	−6.1 (21.0)	−3.9 (25.0)	−3.3 (26.1)	−1.7 (28.9)	2.2 (36.0)	5.0 (41.0)	−6.1 (21.0)
Average precipitation mm (inches)	42.4 (1.67)	38.7 (1.52)	36.8 (1.45)	35.9 (1.41)	40.4 (1.59)	42.1 (1.66)	42.8 (1.69)	42.6 (1.68)	38.8 (1.53)	44.7 (1.76)	39.3 (1.55)	37.3 (1.47)	481.8 (18.97)
Average rainy days	4.3	3.9	3.9	4.5	6.2	7.9	8.8	8.4	7.0	6.7	5.1	4.5	71.2

== Notable people ==
- Rod Coelli, Australian rules footballer

Preceding station	Former services	Following station
Kamarah towards Roto	Temora–Roto Line	Beckom towards Temora
