= Mirrool =

- Town
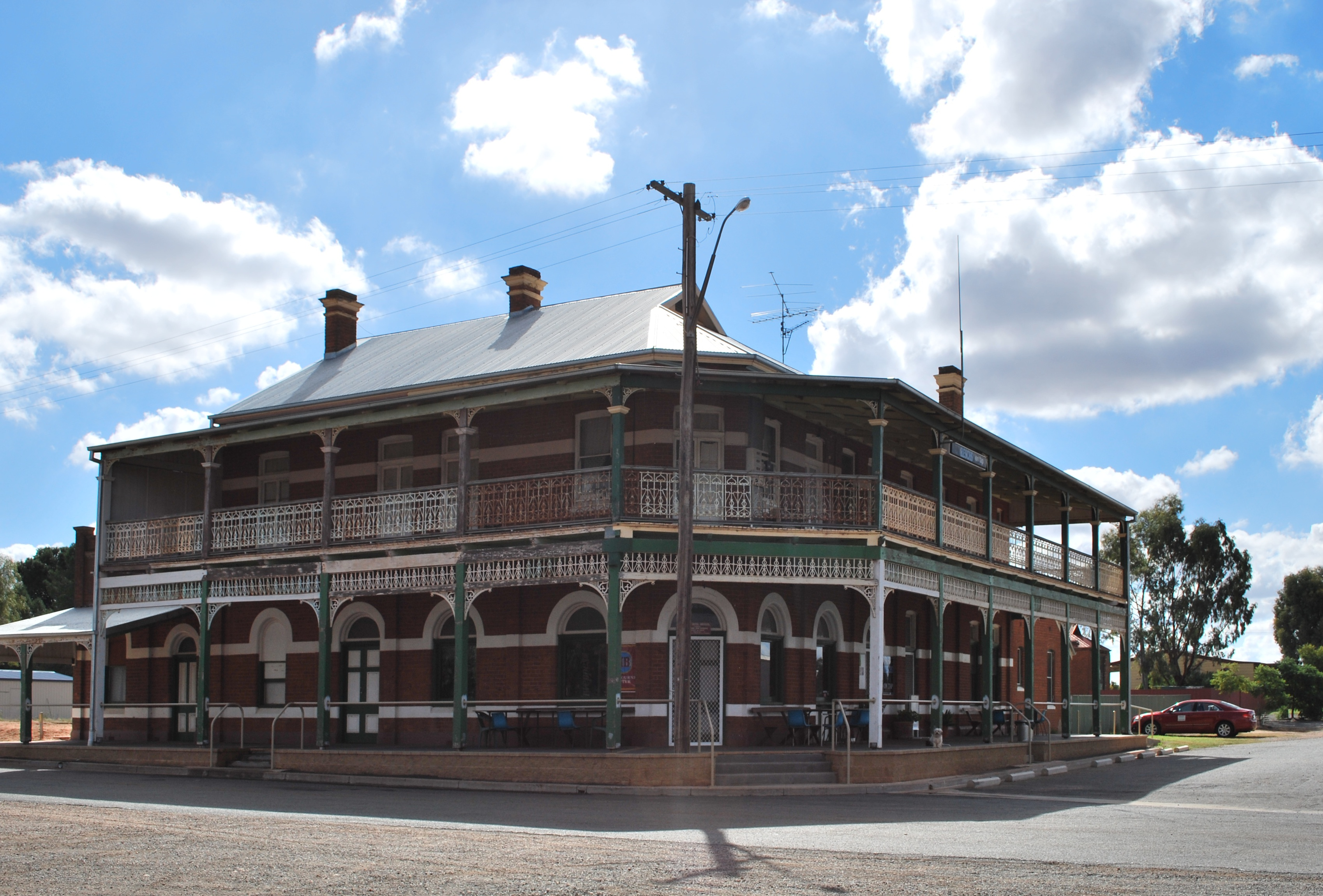
- Mirrool (Royal) Hotel, 2010

- Coordinates: 34°17′16″S 147°5′42″E
- Country: Australia
- State: New South Wales
- LGA: Bland Shire Council
- Location: 473 km (294 mi) SW of Sydney; 107 km (66 mi) E of Griffith; 47 km (29 mi) S of West Wyalong

Government
  - State electorate: Cootamundra
  - Federal division: Riverina
- Elevation: 305 m (1,001 ft)

Population
  - Total: 79 (SAL 2021)
- Postcode: 2665
- County: Bourke

Mirrool is a town in the northern part of the Riverina region of south-west New South Wales, Australia. The town is in the Bland Shire local government area and adjacent to the Newell Highway, 473 kilometres (294 mi) south-west of the state capital, Sydney. At the 2011 census, Mirrool and the surrounding area had a population of 234.

The place name Mirrool is derived from the local indigenous Wiradjuri people, and means "pipeclay", "paint" or "coloured clay".

Mirrool post office was opened on 16 November 1911 and was closed in 1982. A railway station opened with the Temora- Roto railway line in 1908. Passenger services ceased in 1983 and the station was closed in 1985.

The town's pub was built between 1913 and 1916 and opened in 1917. In recent times, it was saved when a group of local farmers banded together to buy the licence just before it was sold off to Sydney. (Liquor licences can be sold to another concern and then reinstated in a different location.)

The town also has a football oval and, despite being in New South Wales, 200 km north of the Victorian border, the code of football played in the town is Australian Rules, because it lies within the Australian Rules territory of the narrow wheat belt, stretching north from the Canola Way and centred on the Newell Highway.

Every second Saturday in October, the town holds a large gathering to which Australian Rules fans congregate to compete in the traditional $1000 prize for kicking a football over the 32-metre silos that are situated opposite the pub. The event was first held in 1992 with the winner that year being footballer Billy Brownless. On some occasions, the winner has been the silos.

== Gallery ==
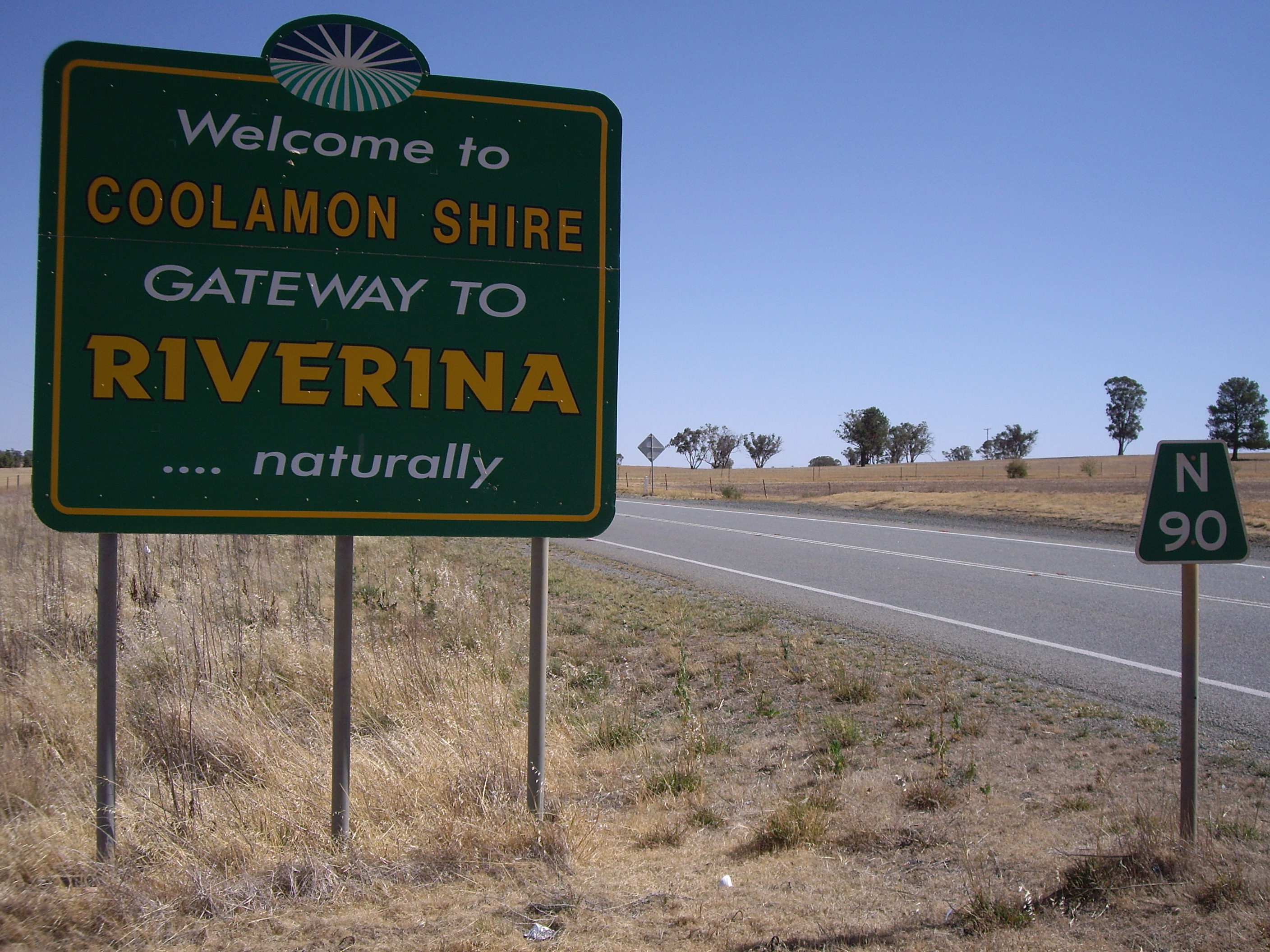
Sign on the outskirts of Mirrool, 2007

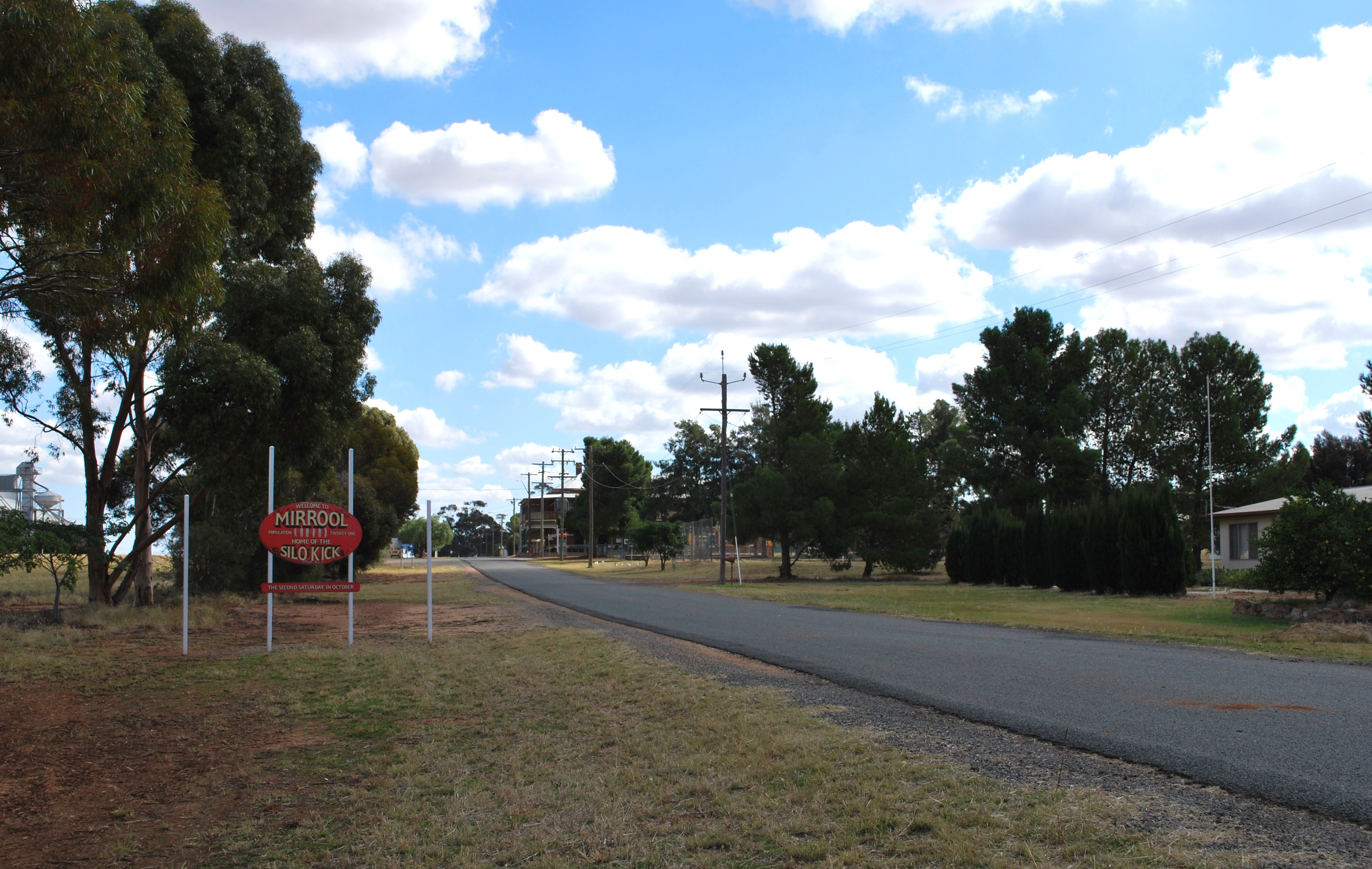
Sign at the entrance to Mirrool, incorporating Australian rules football goal posts, 2010

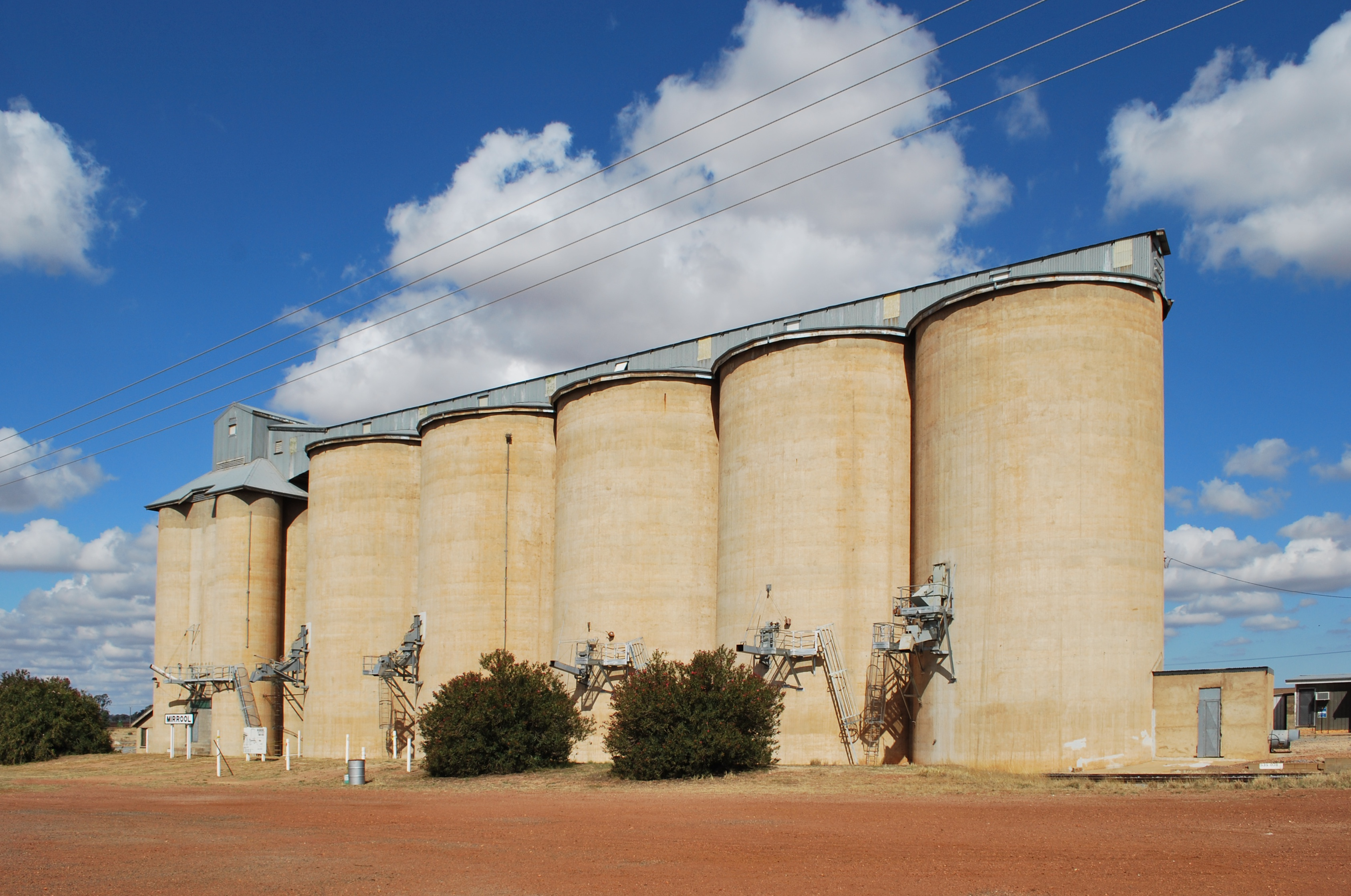
Mirrool silos, 2010

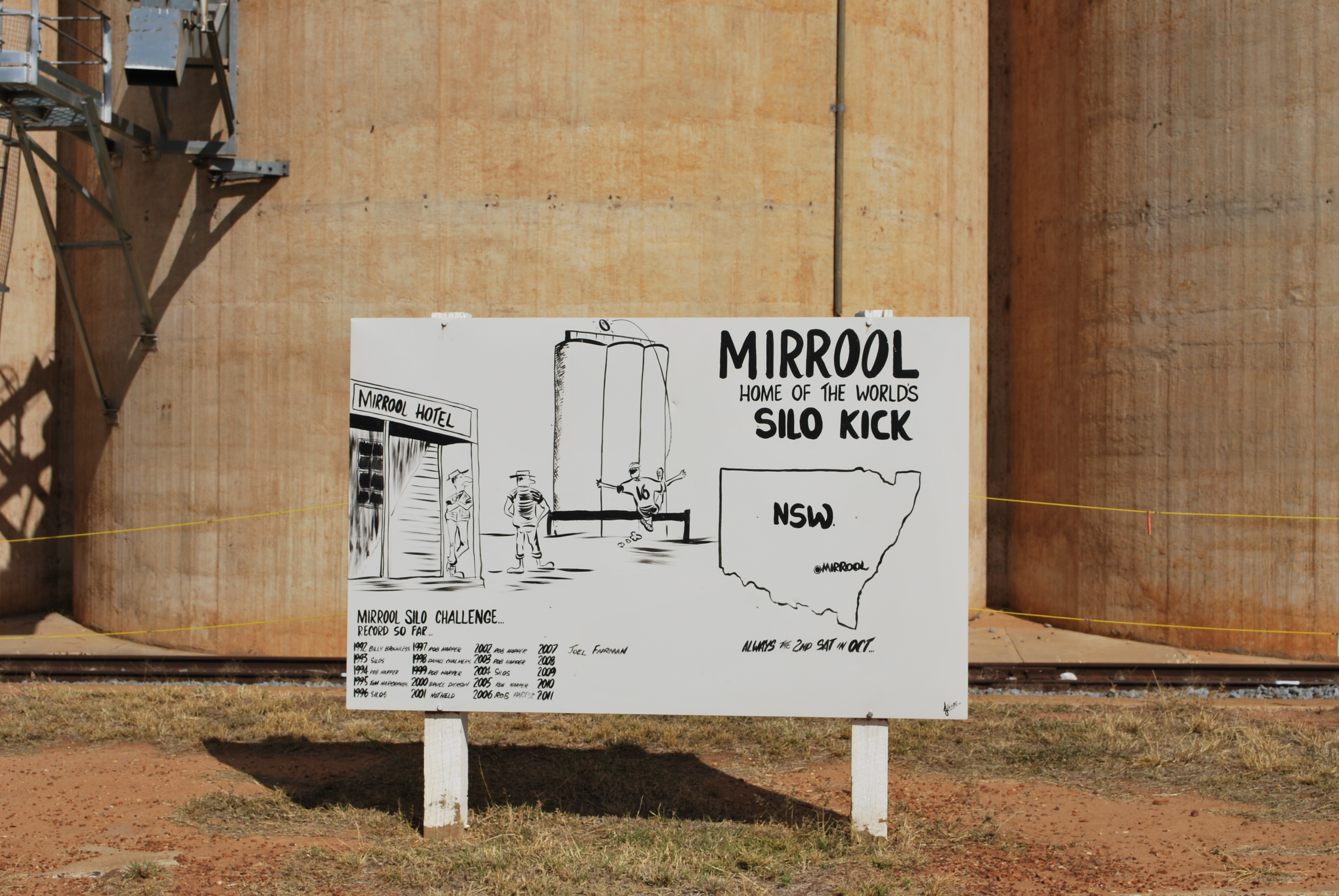
Sign promoting the annual "Silo Kick" event, 2010

Preceding station	Former services	Following station
Beckom towards Roto	Temora–Roto Line	Ariah Park towards Temora
