= Sandy Creek (Mirrool) =

Sandy
- The indefinite location of the Sandy Creek mouth in New South Wales

Location
- Country: Australia
- State: New South Wales
- Region: Riverina (IBRA)
- LGA: Bland

Physical characteristics
- Source: pastoral runoff
  - location: northeast of Tallimba
  - coordinates: 33°56′22″S 147°4′40″E
  - elevation: 312 m (1,024 ft)
- Mouth: indefinite, generally towards Mirrool Creek
  - location: northeast of Binya
  - coordinates: 34°10′22″S 146°39′42″E
  - elevation: 166 m (545 ft)
- Length: 72 km (45 mi)

Basin features
- River system: Lachlan sub–catchment, Murray–Darling basin
- Tributaries
  - left: Native Dog Creek
  - right: Magpie Creek

Sandy Creek, a partly perennial stream that forms part of the Lachlan within the Murrumbidgee catchment in the Murray–Darling basin, is located in the Riverina region of New South Wales, Australia. The creek's course becomes unclear at its mouth.

== Course and features ==
The Sandy Creek (technically a river) rises about 19 kilometres (12 mi) east by north of the locality of Tallimba, west of the town of West Wyalong. The creek flows generally southwest for approximately 70 kilometres (43 mi), joined by two minor tributaries, before becoming unclear approximately 5 kilometres (3.1 mi) west of the locality of Welcome Tank and northeast of Binya as it approaches Mirrool Creek (a tributary of the Lachlan River). The Sandy Creek descends 146 metres (479 ft) over its 72-kilometre (45 mi) course.

== See also ==
- List of rivers of New South Wales (L–Z)
- Rivers of New South Wales
