= Yenda Hotel =

Hotel in New South Wales, Australia

- Hotel Yenda
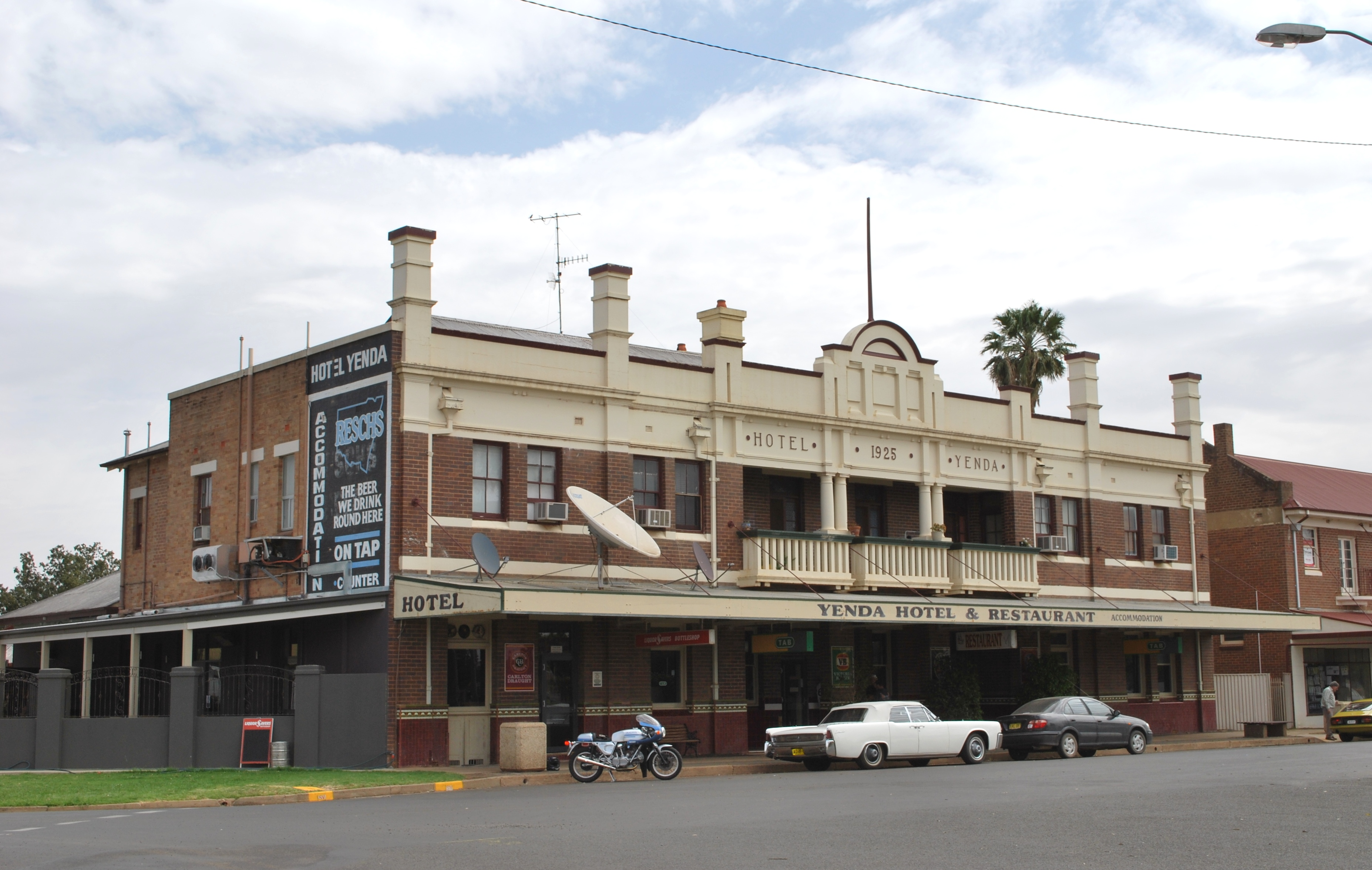
- The Yenda Hotel

- Location in New South Wales
- 34°15′2.064″S 146°11′43.843″E
- Type: Pub
- Location: Yenda, New South Wales, Australia
- Nearest city: Griffith

History
- Built: 1925

Site notes
- Architectural style: Post-Federation

Yenda Hotel (officially styled as Hotel Yenda), or the Yenda Pub is a pub located in the town of Yenda, New South Wales, Australia. Situated in the Riverina region, approximately 16 kilometres (9.9 mi) north-east of Griffith and 550 kilometres (340 mi) west of Sydney, the hotel has long served as a focal point for the local community. As well as a bar, the pub, built in 1925, contains a restaurant, and accommodation is also provided.

== History ==
The original licensee of the pub on 6 November 1925 was George Flood, held under the name Hotel Yenda Limited. Four days later, the license was transferred to James Fraser.

On 19 March 1931, a sudden cyclone that hit the town blew off several sheets of iron from the hotel.

On 21 June 1936 at 5:00am, Mrs Agnes Smith, originally from the Sydney suburb of Bondi Junction who had been working at the Yenda Hotel as a cook, was found unconscious in the bathroom, and subsequently died after being moved to her room. The death was not treated as suspicious, as she had been ill the previous night.

On Monday 22 May 1939, then-licensee Reginald Lennie was charged at the Griffith Police Court for having allowed a person to enter the licensed premises during prohibited hours on April 22. Sergeant T. J. Ellis visited the hotel and found two men in the bar and three in the parlour. Due to the Reginald's good record in the past, the prosecutor, Mr. J. A. Harris stated that conviction would not be recorded provided a bond of £5 was paid and a period of good behaviour for 12 months. Reginald had to pay 8 shillings for court costs.

Yenda Hotel's 100th anniversary, celebrated on 25 October 2025, featured live entertainment, special food, and kid's activities, namely face-painting, a jumping castle, and a colouring-in competition.
