= Murrumbidgee Regional High School =

Secondary day school in Australia

Location
- Griffith, New South Wales; Australia: 34°16′53″S 146°4′14″E (Griffith campus); 34°16′53″S 146°4′14″E (Wade campus)

Information
- Type: Government-funded co-educational comprehensive secondary day school
- Established: 2019
- Teaching staff: 112.7 FTE (2018)
- Enrolment: 1,242 (2018)
- Campuses: Griffith: Coolah Street, Griffith; Wade: Poole Street, Griffith
- Campus type: Regional
- Colours: Teal, robin egg blue, and black
- Website: griffith-h.schools.nsw.gov.au; wade-h.schools.nsw.gov.au

Murrumbidgee Regional High School is a dual-campus government-funded co-educational comprehensive secondary day school located in Griffith, a city in the Riverina region of New South Wales, Australia.

Established in 2019 through the merger of Griffith High School and Wade High School, the former schools enrolled approximately 1,250 students in 2018, from Year 7 to Year 12, of whom eleven percent identified as Indigenous Australians and 26 percent were from a language background other than English. The school is operated by the NSW Department of Education.

== See also ==
- List of government schools in New South Wales
- List of schools in the Riverina
- Education in Australia
