= Rod Coelli =

Australian rules footballer (born 1955)

Personal information
- Full name: Rod Coelli
- Born: 23 April 1955 (age 71)
- Original team: Ardlethan Football Club
- Height: 189 cm (6 ft 2 in)
- Weight: 86 kg (190 lb)

Playing career^{1}
Years	Club	Games (Goals)
1975	South Melbourne	3 (0)
- ^{1} Playing statistics correct to the end of 1975.

Rod Coelli (born 23 April 1955) is a former Australian rules footballer who played with South Melbourne in the Victorian Football League (VFL).

Coelli was recruited from Ardlethan Football Club in the South West Football League (New South Wales). He made three appearances late in the 1975 VFL season and then didn't play a single senior game in 1976.

He joined Sandringham in 1977 and was a member of the grand final losing team that year. In 1981, after 53 games for Sandringham, Coelli returned to his home state and signed with Albury. He won the 1981 Morris Medal, awarded to the "Best and Fairest" player in the Ovens & Murray Football League.
