= Griffith High School (New South Wales, Australia) =

Location
- Griffith, Riverina, New South Wales; Australia; 34°17′30″S 146°02′20″E

Information
- Type: Government-funded co-educational comprehensive secondary day school
- Motto: Latin: Postera crescam laude (We shall grow in the esteem of future generations)
- Established: 1933 (as Griffith Intermediate High School)
- Status: Closed
- Closed: December 2018 (Merged with Wade High School to form Murrumbidgee Regional High School)
- Colours: Green and gold

Griffith High School (abbreviated as GHS) was a now-defunct government-funded co-educational comprehensive secondary day school, located in Griffith, in the Riverina region of New South Wales, Australia.

Established in 1933, the school closed in December 2018 when it merged with the Wade High School to form Murrumbidgee Regional High School. The school was operated by the NSW Department of Education.

== History ==
The school was opened in 1933 as "Griffith Intermediate High School" at the cost of A£15,000, with the foundation of the main building laid by the Minister for Education, David Drummond, on 8 March 1933. The school was upgraded to a fully comprehensive high school in July 1939. The school's badge consists of a green shield with the school's abbreviation "GHS" inside in gold, set above a gold scroll containing the motto. The motto, Postera crescam laude ("Later I shall grow by praise" or, more freely, "We shall grow in the esteem of future generations") is from a line in Horace's Odes: "ego postera crescam laude recens". It is also the motto of the University of Melbourne.

== Notable alumni ==
- Stan Grant – journalist and television presenter
- Andrew Fifita – rugby league player, currently plays for the Cronulla-Sutherland Sharks

== See also ==
- List of government schools in New South Wales
- List of schools in the Riverina
- Education in Australia
