= Michael Coelli =

Australian economist

Michael "Mick" Coelli is an Australian academic and labour economist. He is currently a professor of economics at the University of Melbourne.

He appears in the Australian media on the topic of economics and has been published in The Conversation, the Melbourne Institute, and the Tax and Transfer Policy Institute.

His research papers mainly focus on the Australian labour market, education economics, and gender earnings gaps.

== Career ==
Coelli completed a Bachelor of Commerce with honours in economics from the University of New South Wales, and a Master of Arts and PhD in economics from the University of British Columbia.

He is currently associate professor of economics at the University of Melbourne.

== Publications ==
- Borland, J. & Coelli, M. (2022). The Australian labour market and the digital economy. Economic implications of the digital economy, Sydney, pp. 63-.
- Borland, J. & Coelli, M. (2021). Is It 'Dog Days' for the Young in the Australian Labour Market? AUSTRALIAN ECONOMIC REVIEW, 54(4), pp. 421–444. doi:10.1111/1467-8462.12431
- Coelli, M., Borland, J. (2019) Behind the Headline Number: Why not to Rely on Frey and Osborne's Predictions of Potential Job Loss from Automation. SSRN Electronic Journal.
