= Temora railway station =

Historic site in New South Wales, Australia

Temora
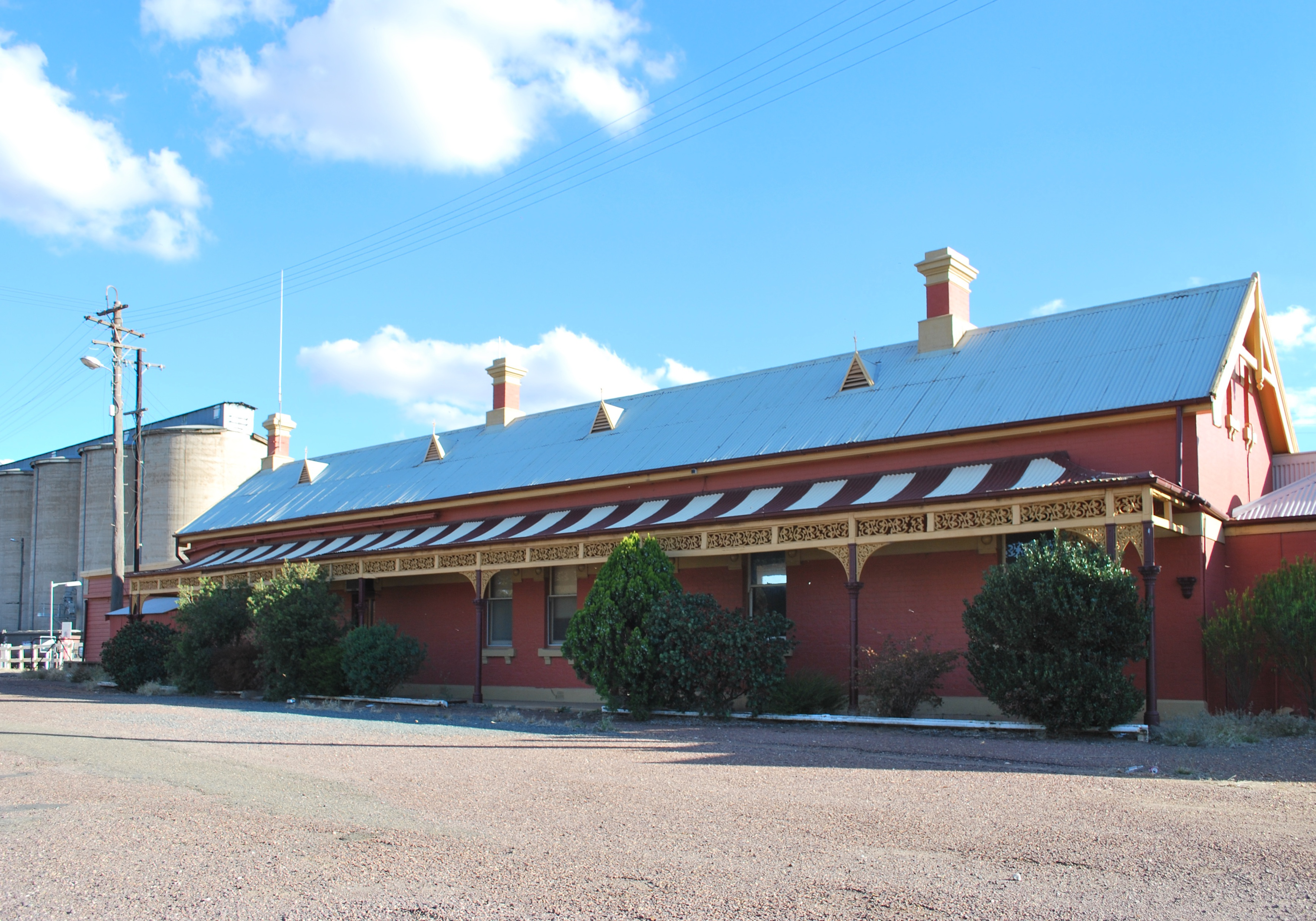

General information
- Location: Parkes Street, Temora, New South Wales; Australia
- Coordinates: 34°26′46″S 147°31′42″E
- Elevation: 291.9 m (958 ft) AHD
- Owner: Transport Asset Manager of New South Wales
- Lines: Lake Cargelligo branch line; Temora-Roto line
- Distance: 489.29 km (304.03 mi) from Central

Other information
- Status: Closed

History
- Opened: 1 September 1893
- Closed: late 1970s

New South Wales Heritage Register
- Official name: Temora Railway Station group
- Type: State heritage (complex / group)
- Designated: 2 April 1999
- Reference no.: 1265
- Type: Railway Platform/Station
- Category: Transport – Rail
Location
- Location within New South Wales Location within Australia

The Temora railway station is a heritage-listed former railway station and now youth hub and mixed-use building located on the Lake Cargelligo railway line in Temora in the Temora Shire local government area of New South Wales, Australia. The station was built from 1893 to 1915 and served the Riverina town of Temora between 1 September 1893 until its closure for passenger services in the late 1970s. The station is also known as the Temora Railway Station group. The property was added to the New South Wales State Heritage Register on 2 April 1999.

The station had a traditional role as a transfer point for passenger services to Hillston, Lake Cargelligo, Rankin Springs, Burcher and Naradhan, most of which were withdrawn in the late 1970s. The station is not presently served by passenger services however remains an important signalling facility.

== History ==
The railway line from Cootamundra came through to Temora, opening on 1 September 1893. The station is located 489.29 kilometres (304.03 mi) from Sydney Central; at an altitude of 291.9 metres (958 ft) AHD; being measurements at the rail, centre of the platform. The railway station took its name from the local property and town, named by Mr. J. D. Macansh in 1848 after a castle called "Temora" in one of Ossian's epic poems.

One item within the yard is the bagged wheat shed, later to become the barley shed. This was built in 1905 to hold 30,000 bags of wheat, and was extended in 1907. Its erection was largely due to Mr. J. J. Donnelly, a prominent grain merchant of the Temora district, who came to Temora in 1893, and in 1904 had begun exporting grain to London. This trade he carried on successfully, included sending 202,000 bags of Temora wheat to London in 1907. The Gillespie and Pardey's Mill siding was opened in 1909. The line was interlocked on 4 March 1915.

The Shell Siding came into operation in 1926.

A F-type level crossing lights were established on the Junee Road crossing on 9 January 1969.

Temora's new youth space was officially opened on 9 December 2015 by Member for Cootamundra, Katrina Hodgkinson. The hub is part of the extensive redevelopment of the heritage-listed railway station. Council received a NSW Government ClubGRANTS funding of $110,993 towards the new room, and acknowledges the support and assistance of the NSW Heritage Division (OEH), Transport NSW and the John Holland Group. The hub is the base for the Shire's Youth Team and a venue for events and programmes. The official opening of the overall redevelopment of the station was celebrated in March 2015, with a visiting steam train and other activities. Dulux was reported to have donated 100 litres (22 imp gal; 26 US gal) of paint in 2015 to the repainting. The station was refurbished with a new community/kids centre/cafe area in the former refreshment room, while the railway station area became a rail museum with historical photos and stories on display.

== Description ==
The complex includes a type 4, third class standard roadside brick station building, completed in 1893; a brick structure, with a reversed curved verandah across the eastern facade with a corrugated iron, single hipped roof, and a verandah extending over the platform area; a refreshment room made of brick, as an initial island/side building, completed in 1912 and extended 1914; a type 3 signal box with a timber skillion roof, completed in 1915; and a footbridge, completed in 1913.

== Heritage listing ==
As of 9 December 2015, Temora has a major station complex with a large third class station preserved in its original condition. The support buildings on the platform support the main building. The station retains a street side veranda. The locomotive complex is an example of a distant country facility with a rare surviving Institute building and office.

The Temora railway station was listed on the New South Wales State Heritage Register on 2 April 1999 having satisfied the following criteria.

The place possesses uncommon, rare or endangered aspects of the cultural or natural history of New South Wales.

This item is assessed as historically rare. This item is assessed as arch. rare. This item is assessed as socially rare.

== Gallery ==
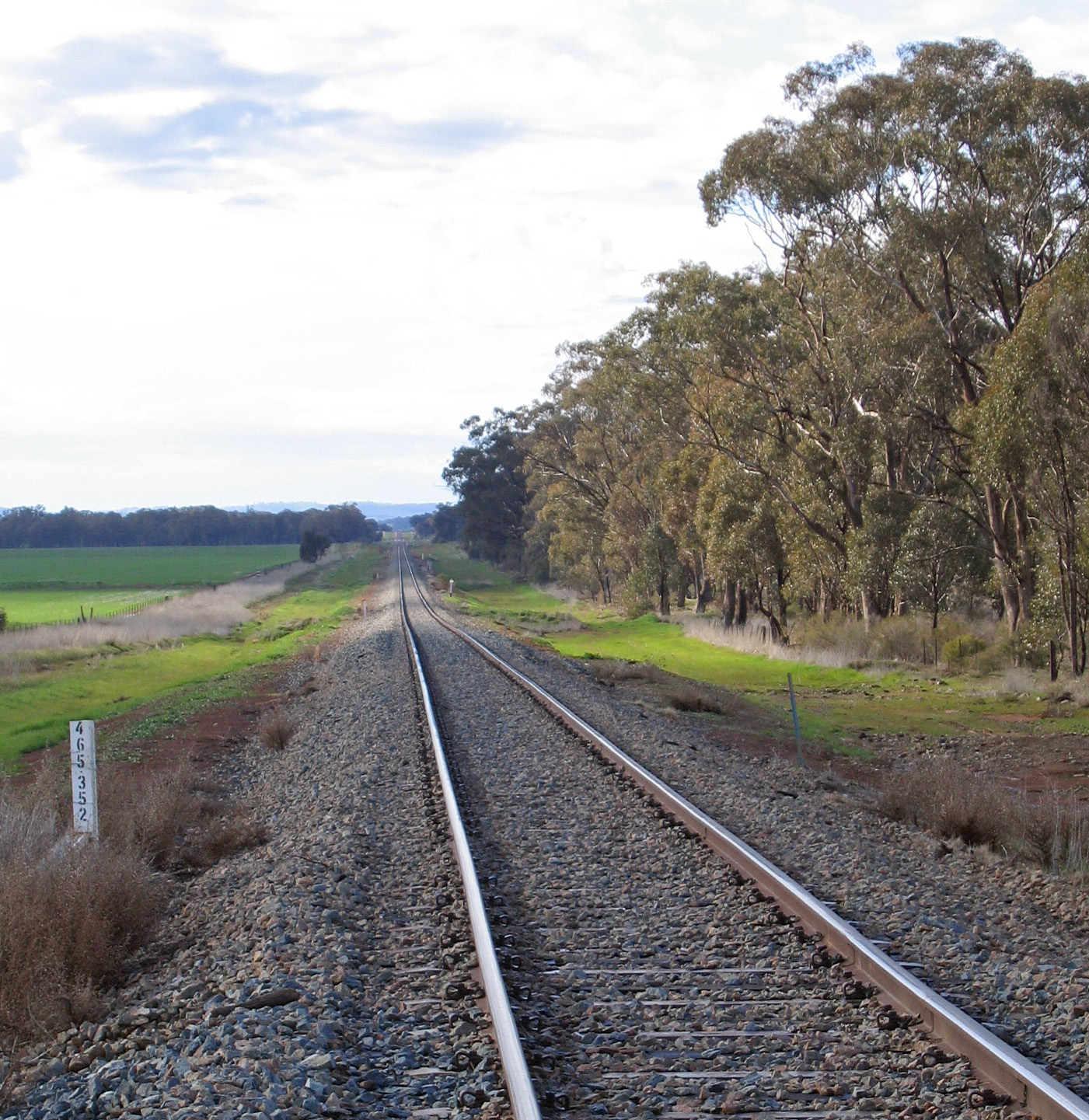
railway line near Temora

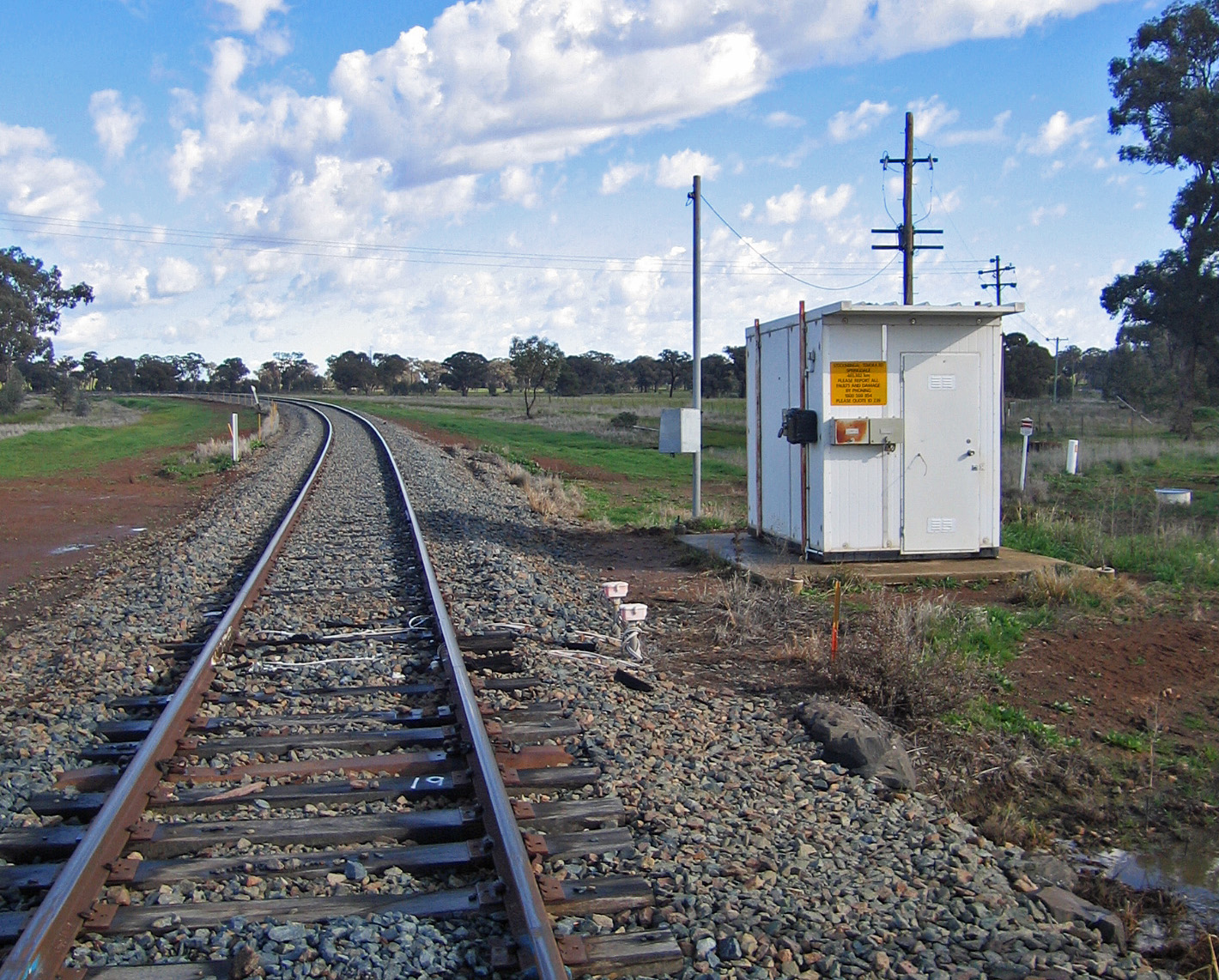
railway line near Temora

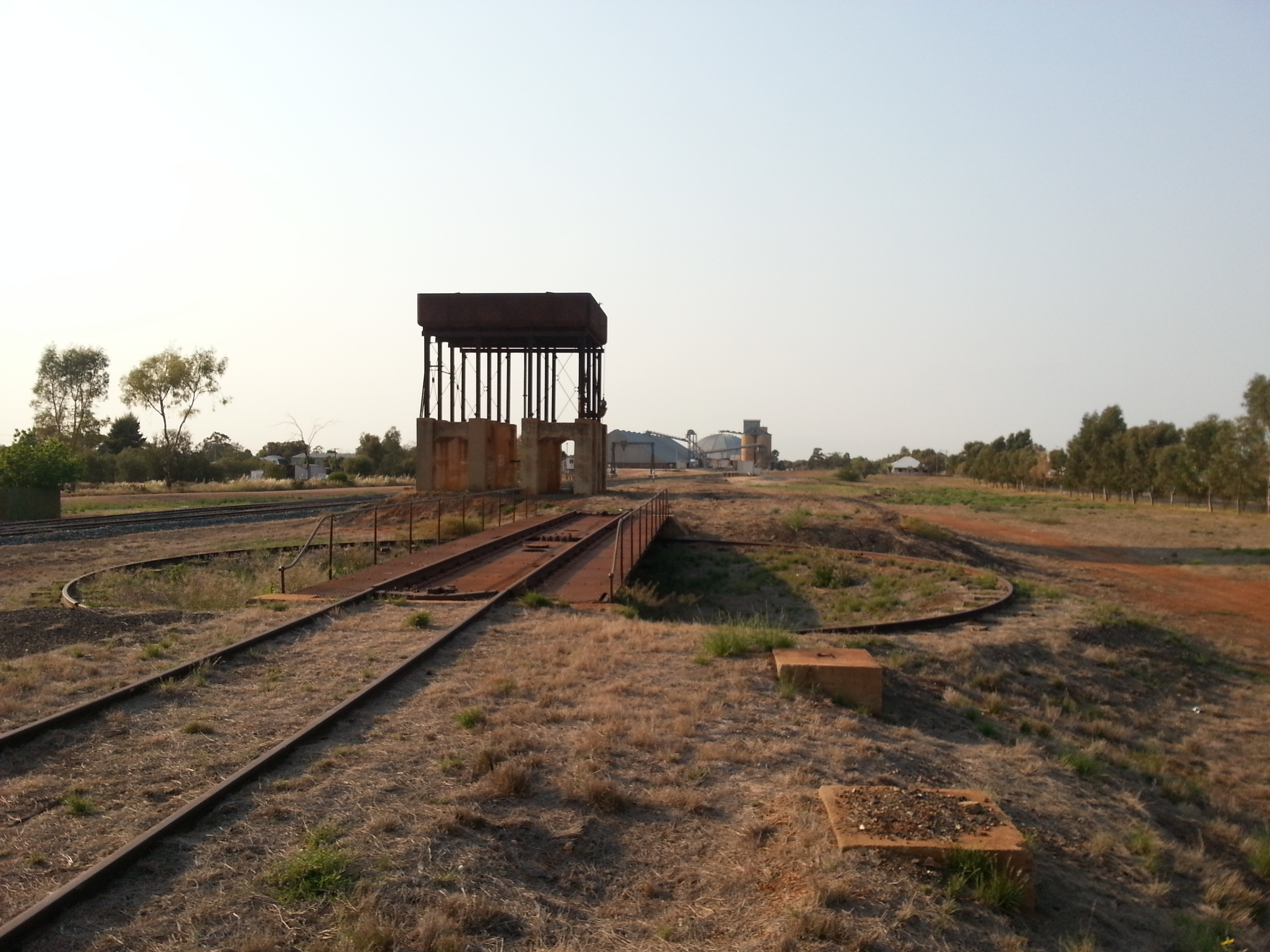
Lake Cargelligo Water Tower & Turntable

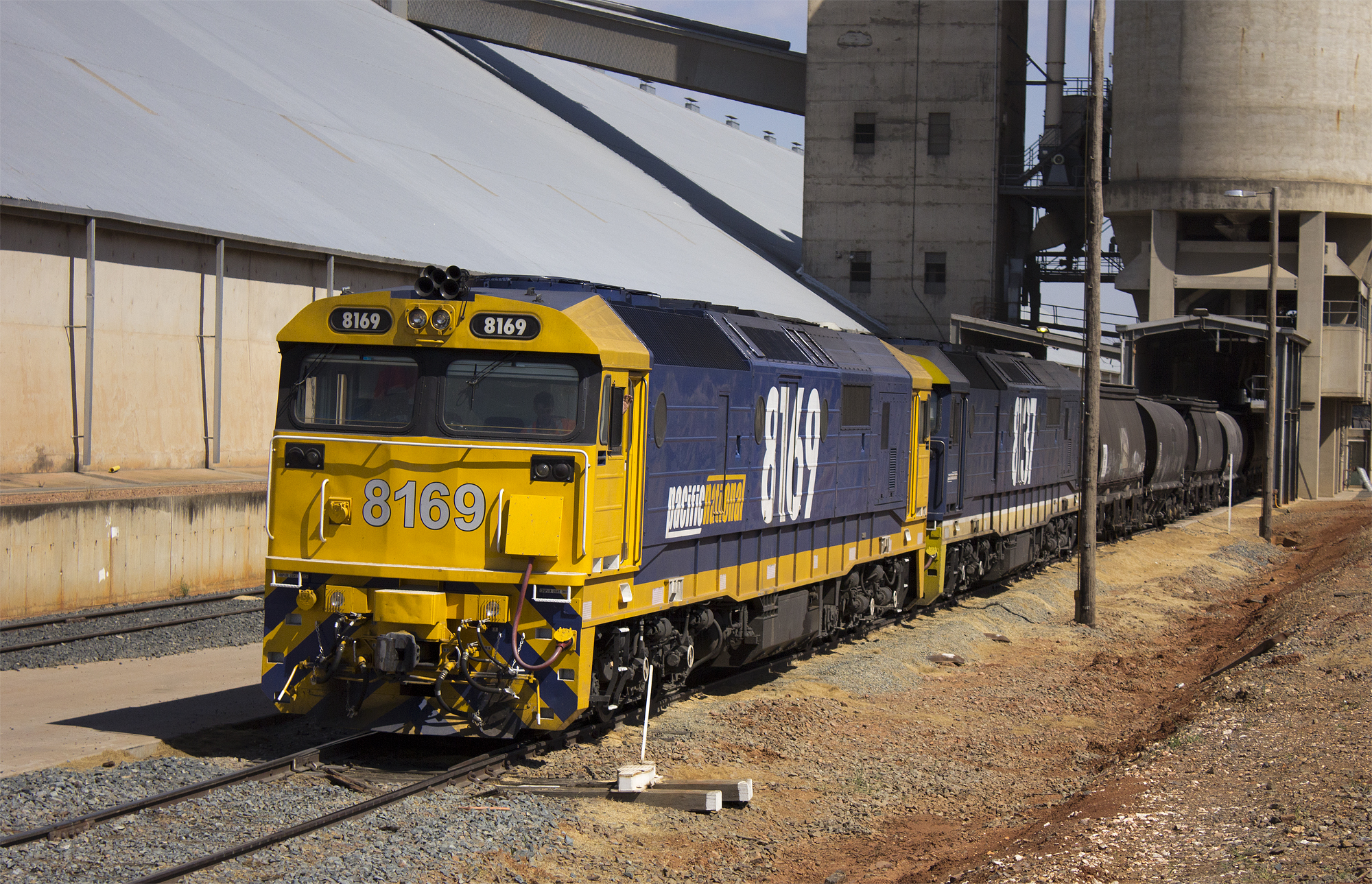
Temora Sub Terminal

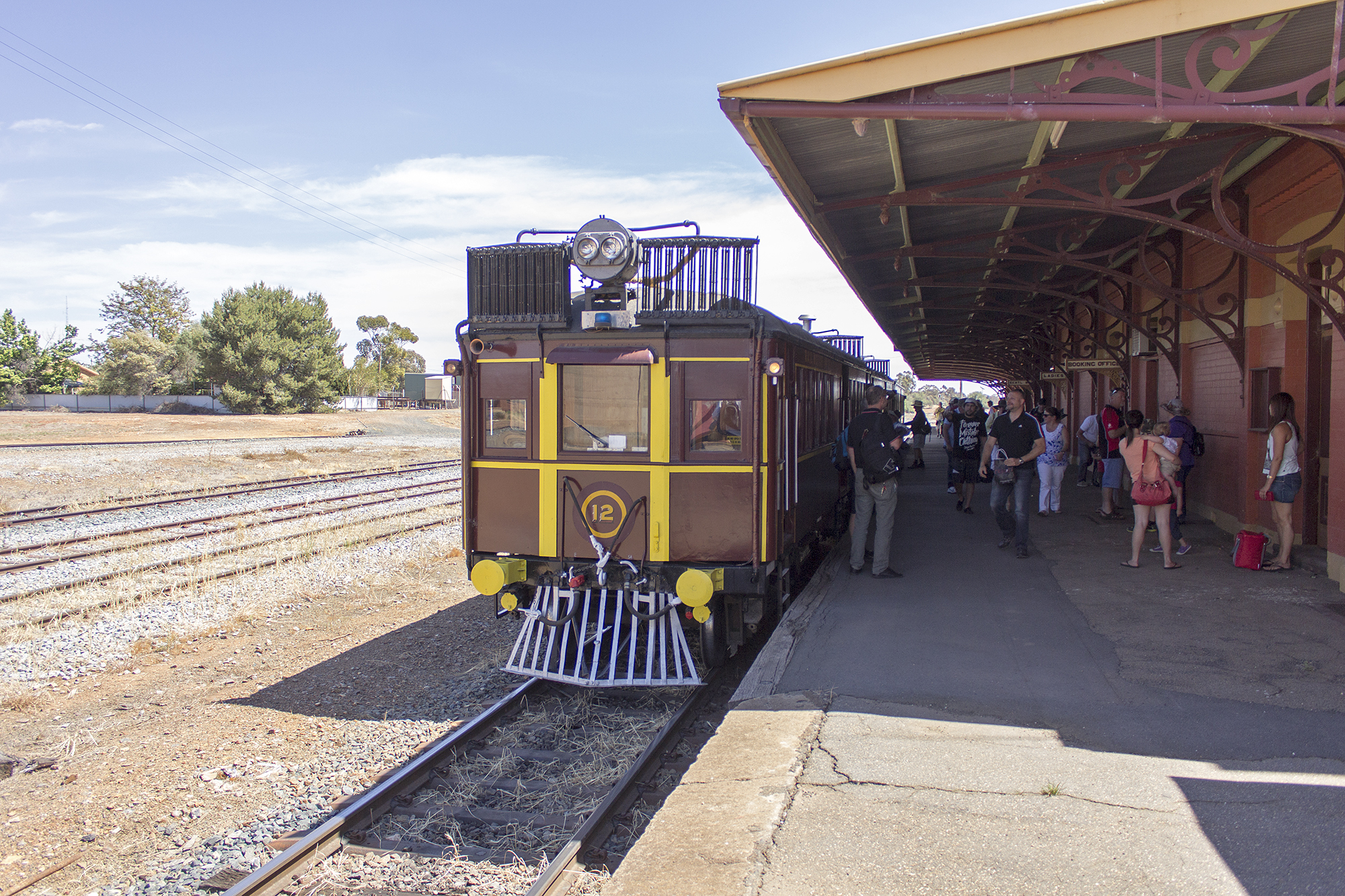
Temora Railway Station

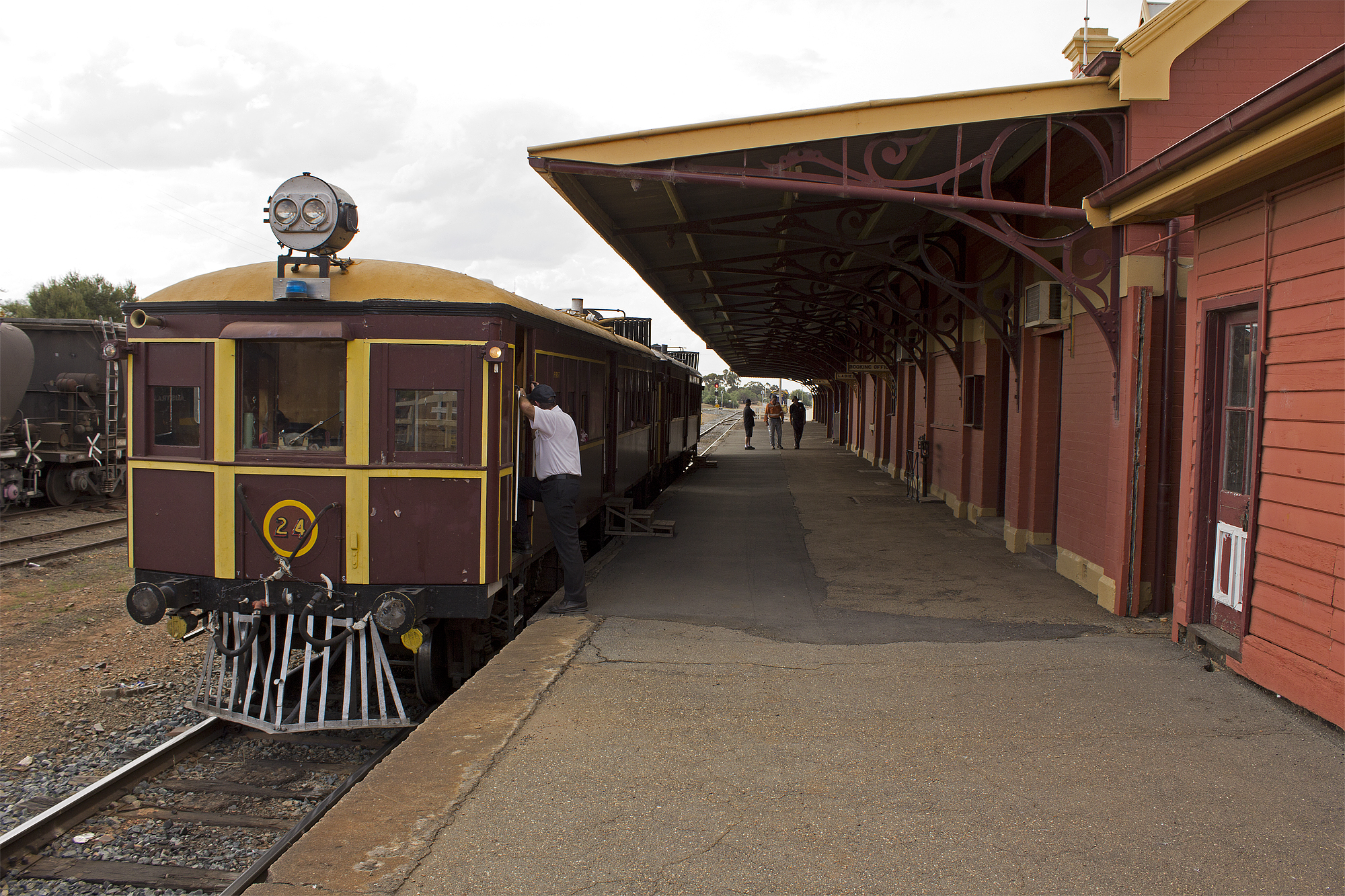

== See also ==
- List of railway stations in New South Wales

Preceding station	Former services	Following station
Sproules Lagoon towards Lake Cargelligo	Lake Cargelligo Line	Combaning towards Cootamundra
Pucawan towards Roto	Temora–Roto Line	Terminus
