= Temora–Roto railway line =

Partly non-operational railway line in the southwest of New South Wales, Australia

- The railway line at Tharbogang towards Roto

Overview
- Termini: Temora; Roto
- Stations: Griffith

History
- Opened: 1920s
- Completed: 31 March 1931

Technical
- Track gauge: 1,435 mm (4 ft 8 1/2 in) standard gauge

The Temora–Roto railway line is a partly non-operational railway line in the south-west of New South Wales, Australia. It branches from the Lake Cargelligo line at the town of Temora and travels west through the northern part of the Riverina to the towns of Griffith and Hillston. A connection to the Broken Hill line created a cross-country route, although it was never utilised to its full potential, and the line beyond Hillston was built to low-grade "pioneer" standards.

The line opened in stages in the 1920s. The line is now only used for goods haulage, mainly wheat, and is non-operational beyond Hillston. Passenger services were operated by CPH railmotors from 1926 until 1974 when services were withdrawn between Griffith and Hillston. Services between Temora and Griffith continued until November 1983 when they were withdrawn as well and replaced by road coach services. Rail passenger services continued between Griffith and Junee via Narrandera until 1986.

Griffith station is the only one that remains open to passengers and, although the line via Temora is the shortest connection to Griffith, passenger trains now operate only over the longer route via Narrandera, because that line passes through larger population centres.

== See also ==
- Rail transport in New South Wales
