= Roto, New South Wales =

Roto
- Town
- Coordinates: 33°03′0″S 145°28′0″E
- Country: Australia
- State: New South Wales
- LGA: Carrathool Shire
- Location: 718 km (446 mi) W of Sydney; 151 km (94 mi) NW of Griffith; 66 km (41 mi) N of Hillston

Government
  - State electorate: Murray
  - Federal division: Farrer

Population
  - Total: 33 (SAL 2021)
- Postcode: 2675
- County: Blaxland

Roto is a small settlement situated in the far-west of New South Wales, Australia. It lies at the junction of the Broken Hill railway line and the partly closed branchline to Temora via Griffith. At the 2016 census, Roto and the surrounding area had a population of 41.

A small railway station opened at the site in 1919, however is now closed. The property "Roto Station" is 123,000 acres (50,000 hectares) of mixed farming. A property nearby to the Roto homestead was the childhood home of two-time Australian off-road motorcycle racing champion Toby Price.

Roto is now considered a ghost town as the last known family living in the village leaving in 1963. Roto once had a Village hall, Post Office and Cricket Ground.

Preceding station	Former services	Following station
Wee Elwah towards Broken Hill	Broken Hill Line	Matakana towards Orange
Terminus	Temora–Roto Line	Hillston towards Temora
