= Ariah Park & District Football Association =

Australian rules football league

- Most recent season or competition: 1951
- Sport: Australian rules football
- Founded: 1904
- Folded: 1951
- No. of teams: 5 (1951), 30 (historical)
- Country: Australia
- Last champion: Ariah Park (1951)
- Related competitions: Barellan & District FL; Tara & District FA

The Ariah Park & District Football Association was an Australian rules football competition based around the town of Ariah Park in southern New South Wales.

== History ==
The Ariah Park & District FA began in 1904. The early years of the Ariah Park & District FA were very informal as Tara and Ariah Park were often the only active clubs in the district. 1908 saw Ardlethan (Warri) and Beaconsfield join to make a 4 team competition, which increased to 8 by 1910. The AP&DFA appears to have lapsed in 1911 but re-formed in 1912 with 5 clubs. The competition entered recess in 1915 due to World War I.

The AP&DFA was re-established in 1919 with the same 5 clubs as before the War - Ariah Park, Mandamah, Methul, Mirrool and Tara. A year later Mandamah and Mirrool both dropped out and were replaced by Barmedman. Ariah Park left for the Beckom Barellan FA in 1921, leaving the Association with only 3 clubs and necessitating a period of recess. Most of the local clubs formed the Tara & District Football Association, which was in essence simply the AP&DFA minus Ariah Park. The competition was re-established in 1927 with Kamarah joining for the first time. They would win premierships in both of their years of competition as part of an 8-season premiership streak across the AP&DFA, Ardlethan District FA and Barellan & District FA. 1928 saw the Barellan & District FA enter recess for a year, with Moombooldool and Binya joining the AP&DFA. They, along with Kamarah and Ardlethan, would all depart a year later leaving only 4 clubs in the Association. In 1931 a reserve grade was introduced, with standalone clubs Rannock, Bectric, Dullah and Winchendon Vale all joining. This competition would secede a year later to form the Rannock & District FA. Ariah Park dominated the 1930s, winning 5 premierships in a row from 1933 to 1937. Their dominance was such that after their 1939 premiership the other clubs sought to restrict them to recruiting only players living within 3 kilometres of Ariah Park town. As the club was not receptive of this proposal, they left the AP&DFA and unsuccessfully attempted to join the Temora & District FA, leaving them without a league in 1940. The AP&DFA entered recess in 1941 due to the effects of WWII.

1945 saw the competition return with 5 clubs - Ariah Park, Beckom, Tara, Methul and Mahda-Mandamah Rovers. In 1947 Ariah Park split into two teams in order to limit their dominance. This would only last two seasons and the re-formed Ariah Park defeated Methul in each of the final three AP&DFA grand finals. The 1940s saw many of the clubs based in rural farming areas merge or fold due to declining player numbers, and by 1951 the lack of competition saw Ariah Park, Mirrool and Temora apply to join the Barellan & District FA. The decision on this issue was postponed for a year, leaving Ariah Park to merge with Mirrool and join the South West District FL reserve grade along with Rannock-Methul. West Wyalong returned to the Northern Riverina FL and Temora were forced into recess due to being unable to join any competition.

== Clubs ==
=== Final ===
Club	Colours	Nickname	Home Ground	Former league	Est.	Years in AP&DFA	AP&DFA Senior Premierships		Fate
Club	Colours	Nickname	Home Ground	Former league	Est.	Years in AP&DFA	Total	Years	Fate
Ariah Park	(1913) (1930s)(1945–51)	Brown Bombers	Ariah Park Recreation Reserve, Ariah Park	T&DFA	1900s	1904-1910, 1912–1920, 1927–1939, 1945–1946, 1949–1951	14	1905, 1906, 1929, 1931, 1933, 1934, 1935, 1936, 1937, 1939, 1946, 1949, 1950, 1951	Unaffiliated in 1911. Moved to Beckom Barellan FA in 1921. Recess in 1940. Split into Browns and Golds in 1947. Merged with Mirrool to form Ariah Park-Mirrool in South West District FL in 1952
Mirrool			Mirrool Recreation Reserve, Mirrool	T&DFA	1910	1910, 1912–1919, 1927, 1929–1932, 1936–1938, 1949–1951	1	1914	Moved to Beckom Barellan FA in 1920. Played merged with Methul in 1928. Played in Ardlethan District FA in 1933–34. Recesses in 1911, 1933–35 and 1939–48. Merged with Ariah Park to form Ariah Park-Mirrool in South West District FL in 1952
Rannock-Methul		Federals	Rannock Recreation Reserve, Rannock	–	1951	1951	0	–	Moved to South West District FL in 1952
Temora		Kangaroos	Nixon Park, Temora	T&DFA	1900s	1906, 1909–1910, 1948–1951	0	–	Recess in 1907-08 and 1911. Formed Temora & District FA in 1912. Recess between 1952 and 1954, re-formed in Wagga Sunday FL in 1955
West Wyalong			McAlister Oval, West Wyalong	NRFL	1949	1950-1951	0	–	Returned to Northern Riverina FL in 1952

=== Former ===
Club	Colours	Nickname	Home Ground	Former league	Est.	Years in AP&DFA	AP&DFA Senior Premierships		Fate
Club	Colours	Nickname	Home Ground	Former league	Est.	Years in AP&DFA	Total	Years	Fate
Ardlethan	(1908–10)(1927–28)(1947–48)	Blues (1927-28)	Ardlethan Sports Ground, Ardlethan	N&DFA, B&DFA	1890s	1908-1910, 1927–1928, 1947–1948	0	–	Moved to Barellan & District FL in 1911. Moved to Ardlethan & District FA in 1929. 1949 unknown, joined Barellan & District FL in 1950
Ariah Park Browns		Browns	Ariah Park Recreation Reserve, Ariah Park	–	1947	1947-1948	1	1948	Merged with Golds to re-form Ariah Park in 1949
Ariah Park Golds		Golds	Ariah Park Recreation Reserve, Ariah Park	–	1947	1947-1948	0	–	Merged with Browns to re-form Ariah Park in 1949
Ariah Park Warrigals		Warrigals	Ariah Park Recreation Reserve, Ariah Park	–	1930	1930	0	–	Folded after 1930 season
Barmedman			Barmedman Recreation Ground, Barmedman	T&DFA	1912	1920	0	–	Moved to Bolygamy District FA in 1921
Beaconsfield			Unknown ground in Quandary	–	1908	1908	0	–	Folded after 1908 season
Bectric			Bectric Recreation Reserve, Bectric	M&DFA, T&DFA	1901	1910, 1931, 1934	0	–	Recess between 1911 and 1924, re-formed in Tara & District FA in 1925. Played in Rannock & District FA in 1932–33, returned there in 1935.
Beckom			Beckom Recreation Ground, Beckom	B&DFA	1910	1910, 1937–1938, 1945–1949	0	–	Recess between 1911–18 and 1939–44. Joined Beckom Barellan FA in 1919 and Barellan & District FL in 1950
Beckom-Mirrool			Beckom Recreation Ground, Beckom and Mirrool Recreation Reserve, Mirrool	–	1909	1909	0	–	De-merged into Beckm and Mirrool in 1910
Binya			Binya Recreation Ground, Binya	B&DFA	1921	1928	0	–	Returned to Barellan & District FL in 1929
Dullah				–	1930	1930-1931	0	–	Folded after 1931 season
Kamarah			Kamarah Recreation Ground, Kamarah	B&DFA	1911	1927-1928	2	1927, 1928	Returned to Barellan & District FL in 1929
Linton			Pucawan Recreation Reserve, Pucawan	–	1909	1909-1910	0	–	Recess in 1911, re-formed in Temora & District FA in 1912
Mahda				T&DFA, ADFA	1924	1932, 1935–1940	0	–	Played in Ardlethan District FA in 1933–34. Merged with Mandamah to form Mahda-Mandamah Rovers in 1945.
Mahda-Mandamah Rovers				–	1945	1945-1949	1	1945	Merged with Rannock in 1950
Mandamah			Mandamah Recreation Ground, Ariah Park	–	1913	1913-1919, 1934–1940	0	–	Recess between 1920 and 1933. Merged with Mahda to form Mahda-Mandamah Rovers in 1945.
Methul	(1912)(1913) (1920s)(1930s)	Greens	Methul Recreation Reserve, Methul	G&DFA, T&DFA	1893	1912-1920, 1927, 1929–1948	4	1913, 1930, 1940, 1947	Played in Tara & District FA between 1921 and 1926. Played merged with Mirrool in 1928. Merged with Tara to form The Stars in 1949.
Methul-Mirrool			Methul Recreation Reserve, Methul and Mirrool Recreation Reserve, Mirrool	–	1928	1928	0	–	De-merged into Methul and Mirrool in 1929
Moombooldool		Greens	Moombooldool Ground, Moombooldool	B&DFL	1911	1928	0	–	Returned to Barellan & District FL in 1929
Rannock			Rannock Recreation Reserve, Rannock	T&DFA, T&DFA	1923	1931, 1948-1950	0	–	Formed Rannock & District FA in 1932. Merged with The Stars to form Rannock-Methul after 1950 season
Springwood				–	1905	1905-1906	0	–	Folded during 1906 season
Tara (Tara-Walleroobie 1940)		Blue and Whites	Tara Recreation Reserve, Tara	T&DFA	1904	1904-1910, 1912, 1914, 1919–1920, 1927–1948	8	1904, 1907, 1908, 1909, 1910, 1919, 1920, 1932	Recess in 1911 and 1913. Played in Tara & District FA between 1921 and 1926. Merged with Methul to form The Stars in 1949.
The Stars			Tara Recreation Reserve, Tara and Methul Recreation Reserve, Methul	–	1949	1949-1950	0	–	Merged with Rannock to form Rannock-Methul after 1950 season
Walleroobie			Walleroobie Recreation Reserve, Walleroobie	ADFA	1921	1933-1939	1	1938	Merged with Tara in 1940
Winchendon Vale		Maroons		–	1931	1931	0	–	Formed Rannock & District FA in 1932

== Premierships ==
Year	Premier	Score	Runners-up	Notes
1904	Tara		Ariah Park	
1905	Ariah Park		Tara	
1906	Ariah Park		Tara	
1907	Tara			
1908	Tara	?.? (34) - ?.? (13)	Ariah Park	
1909	Tara		Beckom-Mirrool	
1910	Tara	1.7 (13) - 1.4 (10)	Mirrool	
1911	Recess			
1912	?			
1913	Methul	Margin 13 points	Mirrool	
1914	Mirrool			
1915-18	Recess (WWI)			
1919	Tara		Ariah Park	
1920	Tara		Methul	
1921-26	Recess			
1927	Kamarah	5.10 (4) - 4.11 (35)	Ariah Park	
1928	Kamarah	16.20 (116) - 10.10 (70)	Ariah Park	
1929	Ariah Park	15.13 (103) - 13.10 (88)	Methul	
1930	Methul	7.11 (53) - 7.5 (45)	Tara	
1931	Ariah Park		Mirrool	
1932	Tara		Ariah Park	
1933	Ariah Park	11.12 (78) - 10.13 (73)	Tara	
1934	Ariah Park		Methul	
1935	Ariah Park	?.? (92) - ?.? (81)	Methul	
1936	Ariah Park	?.? (71) - ?.? (59)	Mahda	
1937	Ariah Park	?.? (78) - ?.? (55)	Mirrool	
1938	Walleroobie	10.15 (75) - 4.8 (32)	Methul	
1939	Ariah Park	25.17 (167) - 11.8 (74)	Methul	
1940	Methul	8.8 (56) - 6.11 (47)	Mahda	
1941-44	Recess (WWII)			
1945	Mahda-Mandamah Rovers	9.13 (67) - 8.9 (57)	Ariah Park	
1946	Ariah Park	12.19 (91) - 11.13 (79)	Beckom	
1947	Methul	14.12 (96) - 11.7 (73)	Beckom	
1948	Ariah Park Browns	13.13 (91) - 7.7 (49)	Ariah Park Golds	
1949	Ariah Park	12.21 (93) - 11.15 (81)	Mirrool	
1950	Ariah Park	10.15 (75) - 8.18 (66)	Mirrool	
1951	Ariah Park	11.17 (83) - 9.7 (61)	Mirrool	
