= Euberta, New South Wales =

Euberta New South Wales
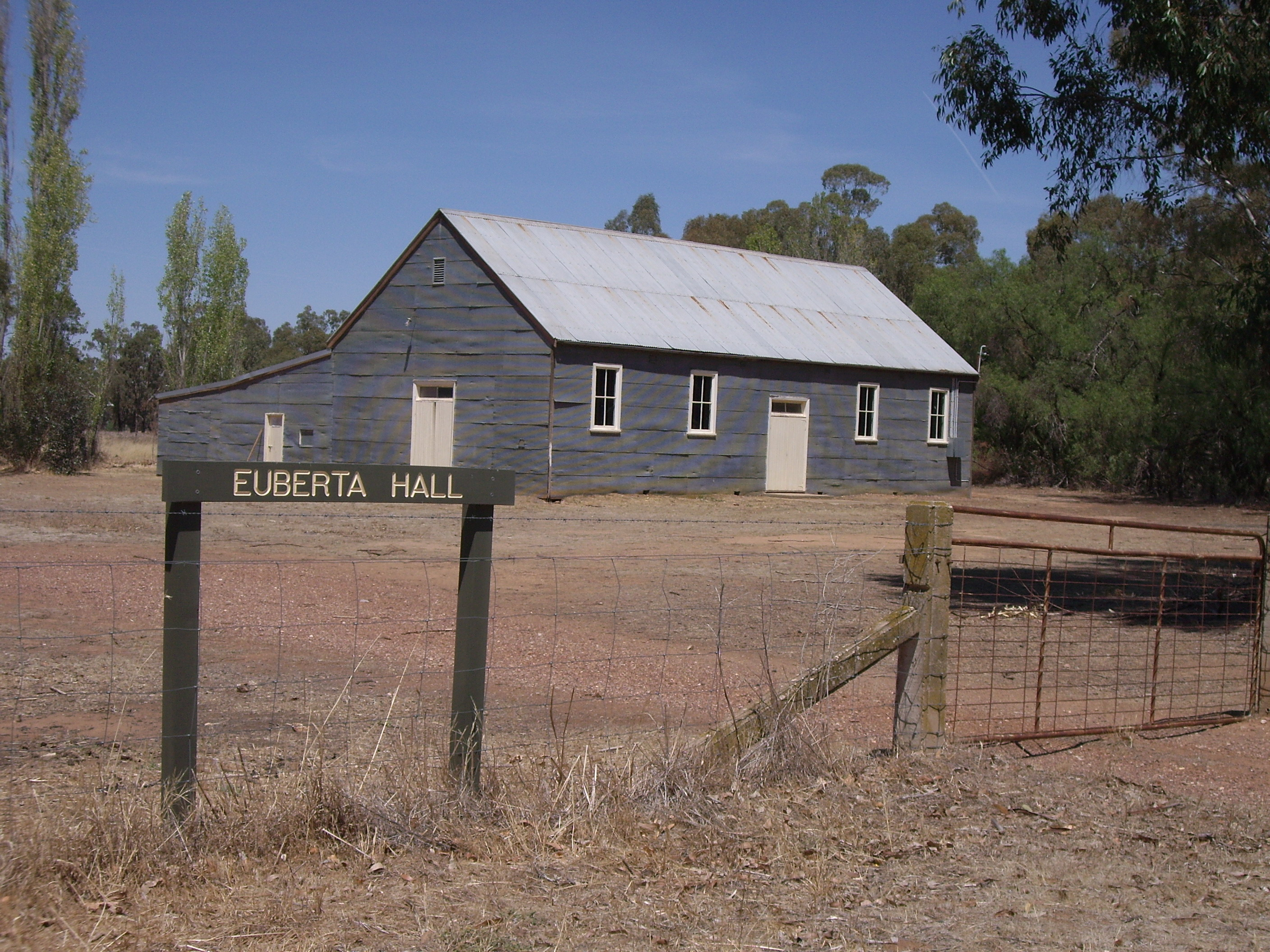
- Euberta Hall

- Coordinates: 35°04′S 147°13′E
- Population: 130 (2021 census)
- Postcode(s): 2659
- Elevation: 160 m (525 ft)
- Location: 478 km (297 mi) from Sydney; 20 km (12 mi) from Wagga Wagga; 9 km (6 mi) from Malebo; 6 km (4 mi) from Millwood
- LGA(s): City of Wagga Wagga
- County: Bourke
- State electorate(s): Wagga Wagga

Euberta is a farming community in the central Riverina area of New South Wales. It is situated on the old Narrandera road with Millwood 6 kilometres to its west and Malebo 9 kilometres to its east. At the 2021 census, Euberta had a population of 130 people. The area is made up of rich pastoral close to the Murrumbidgee River giving graziers the ability to use central pivot and other irrigation systems to grow crops such as Lucerne.

== Gallery ==
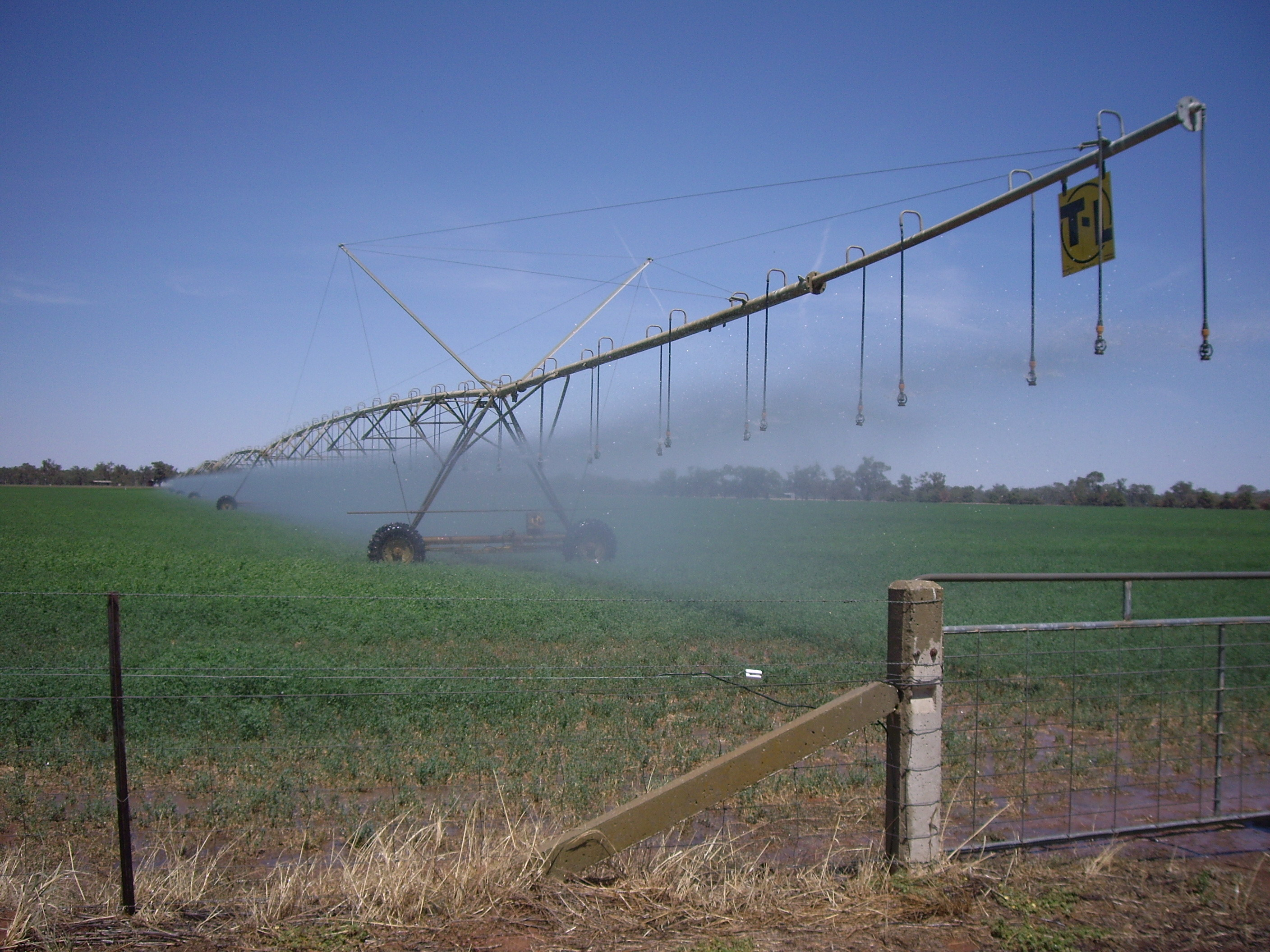
Centre Pivot Irrigation at Euberta

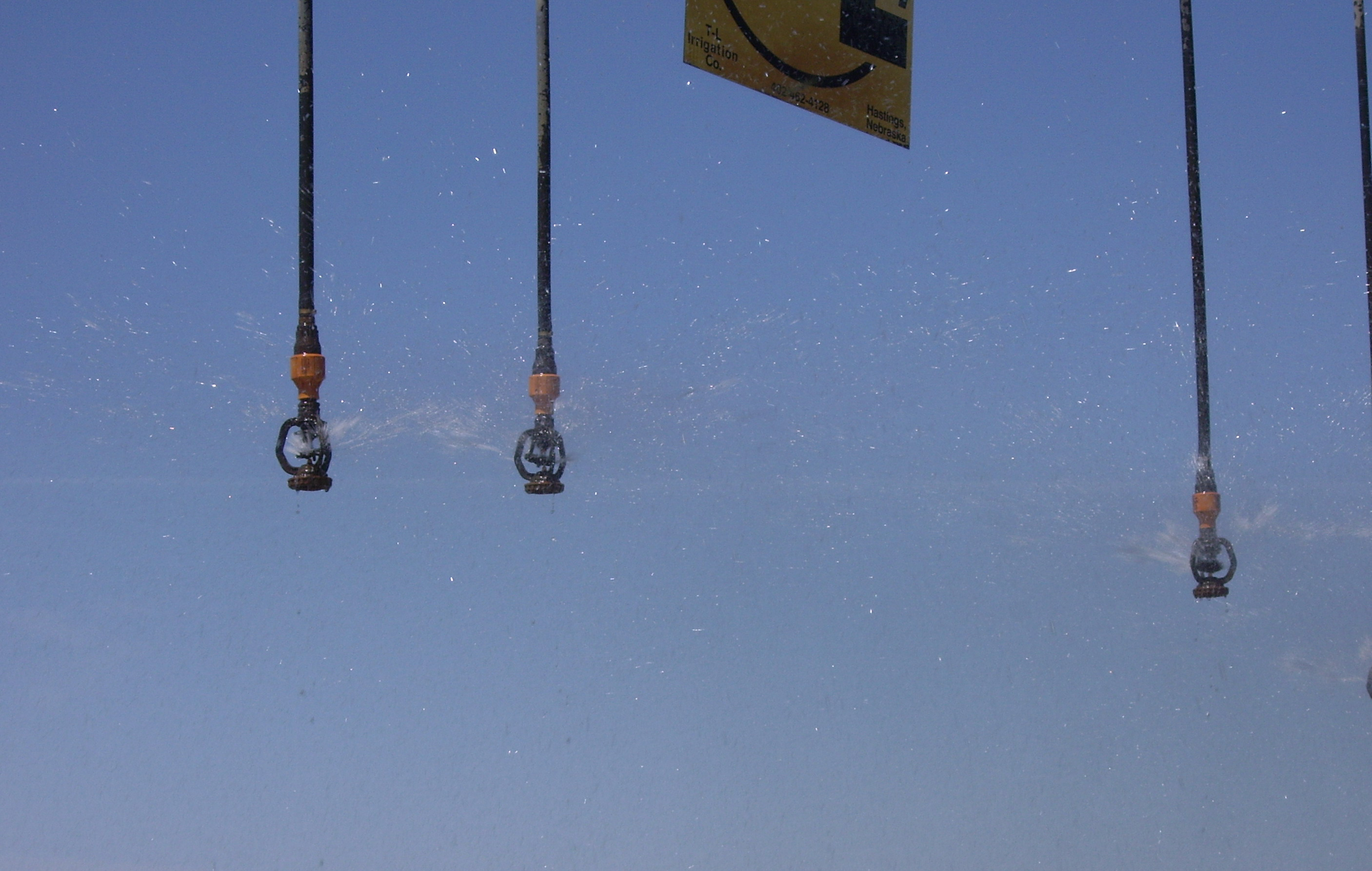
Centre Pivot Irrigation (close up)

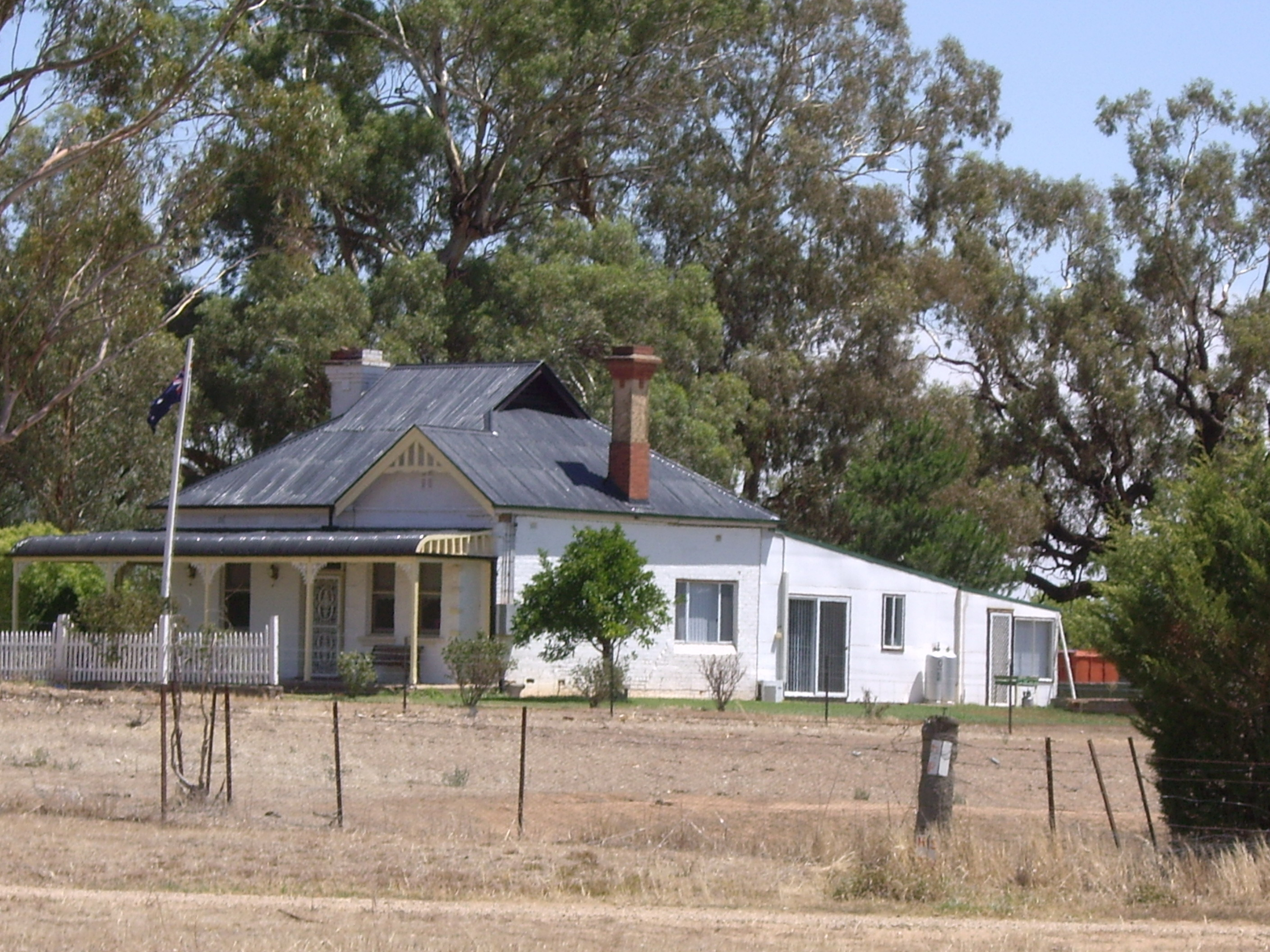
Homestead at Euberta
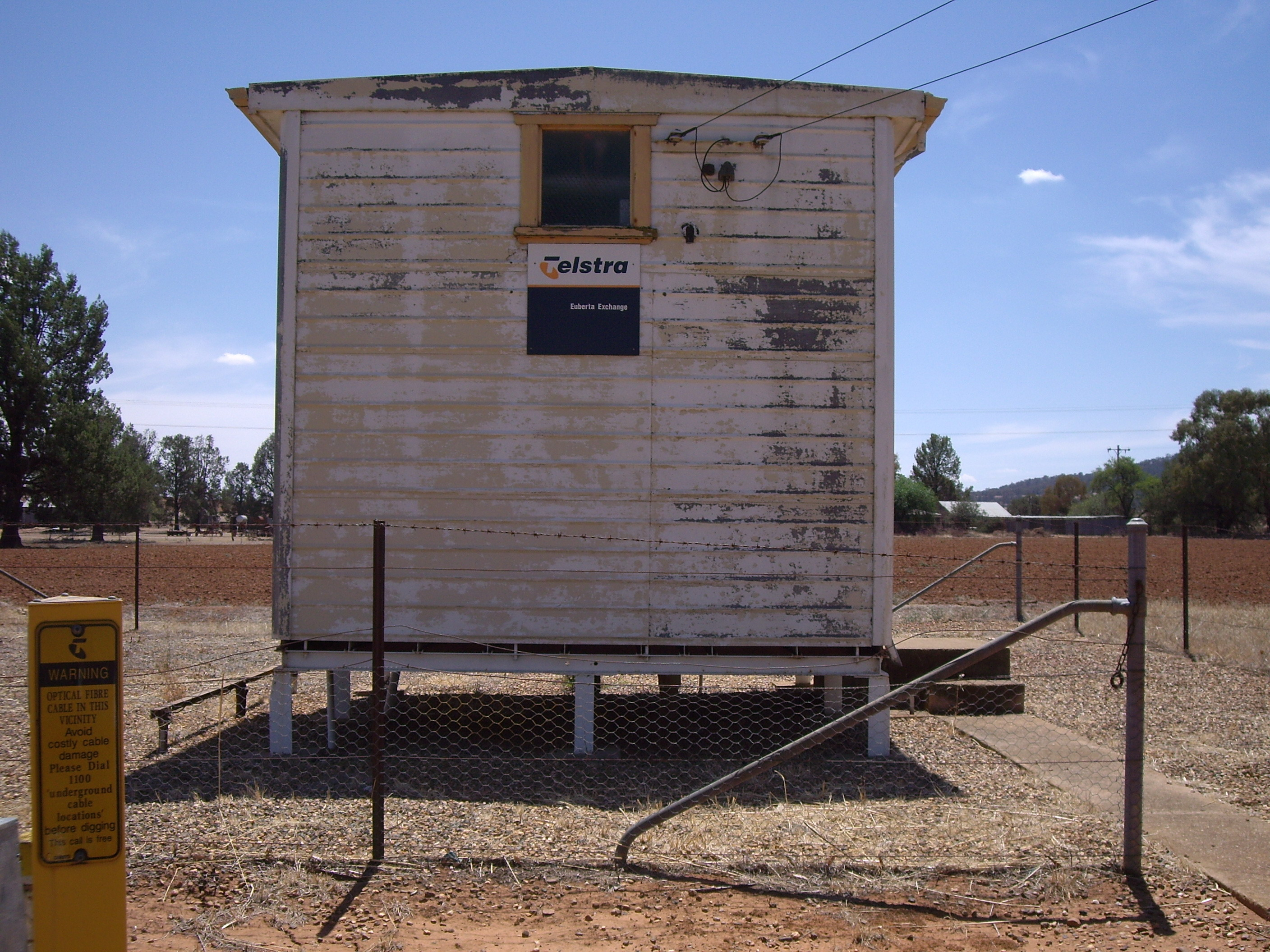
Euberta Telephone Exchange
