= Malebo, New South Wales =

Malebo
- Town
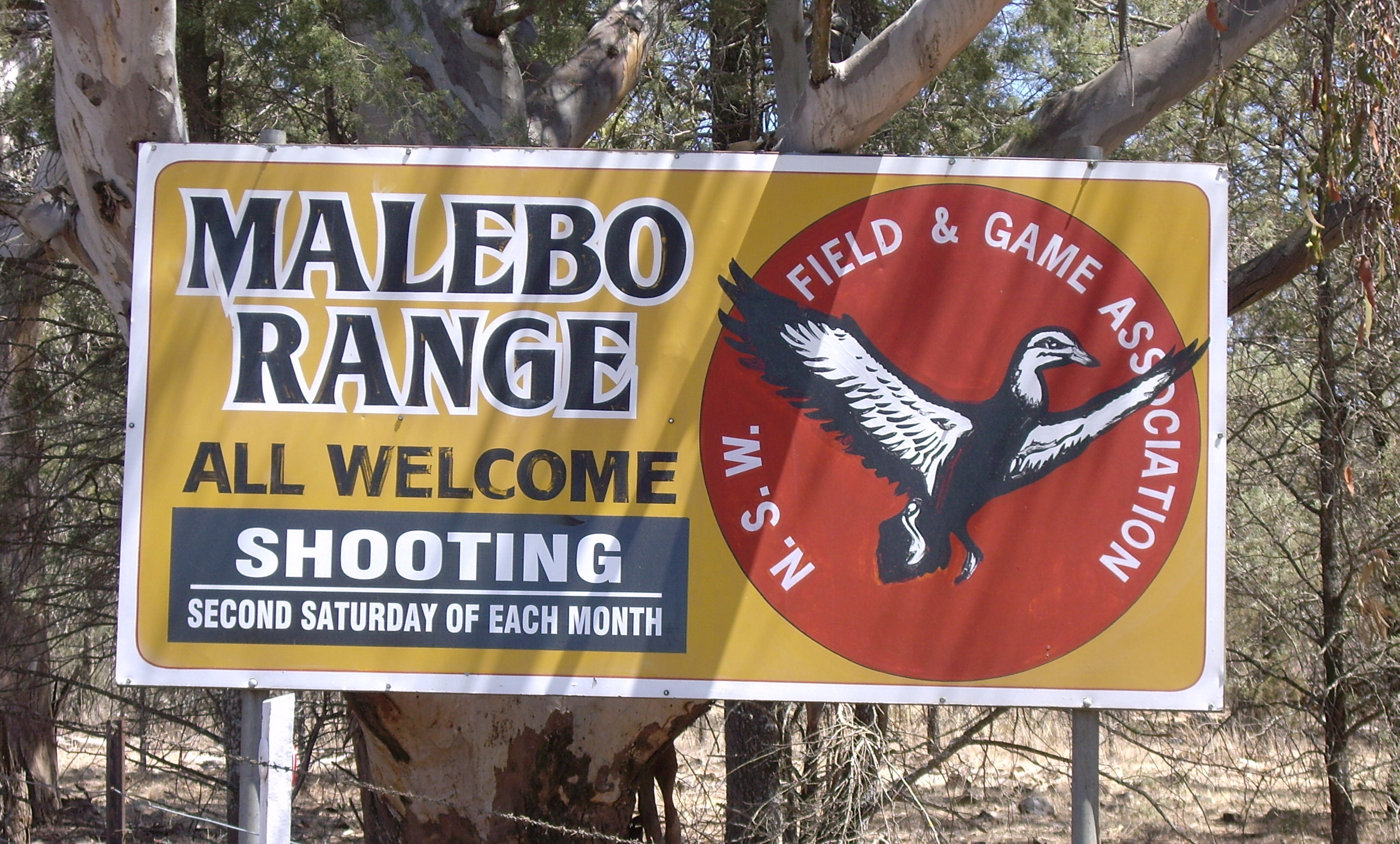
- Malebo Shooting Range

- Coordinates: 35°04′S 147°16′E
- Country: Australia
- State: New South Wales
- LGA: City of Wagga Wagga
- Location: 10 km (6.2 mi) from Wagga Wagga; 16 km (9.9 mi) from Millwood

Government
  - State electorate: Wagga Wagga
- Elevation: 169 m (554 ft)
- Postcode: 2650
- County: Bourke

Malebo is an unbounded neighbourhood in the locality of Euberta in the central east part of the Riverina. It is situated by road, about 10 km west of Wagga Wagga and 16 km east of Millwood.

Malebo has no public buildings nor signage other than the prominent Malebo Shooting Range sign on the ridge of Malebo hill.

Malebo Post Office opened on 16 August 1888 and closed in 1912. It had a hotel.

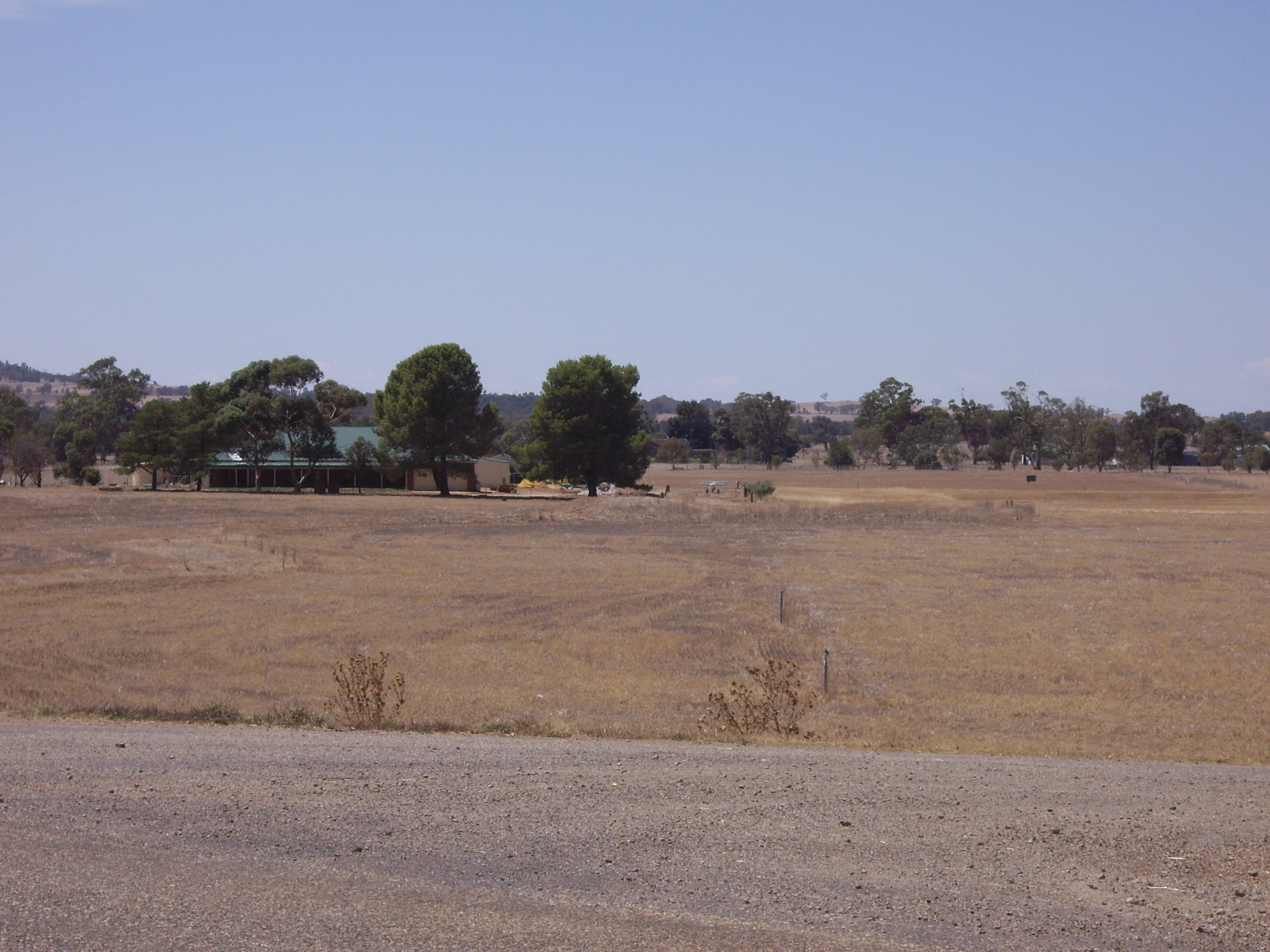
Malebo valley
