= Currawarna =

- Town
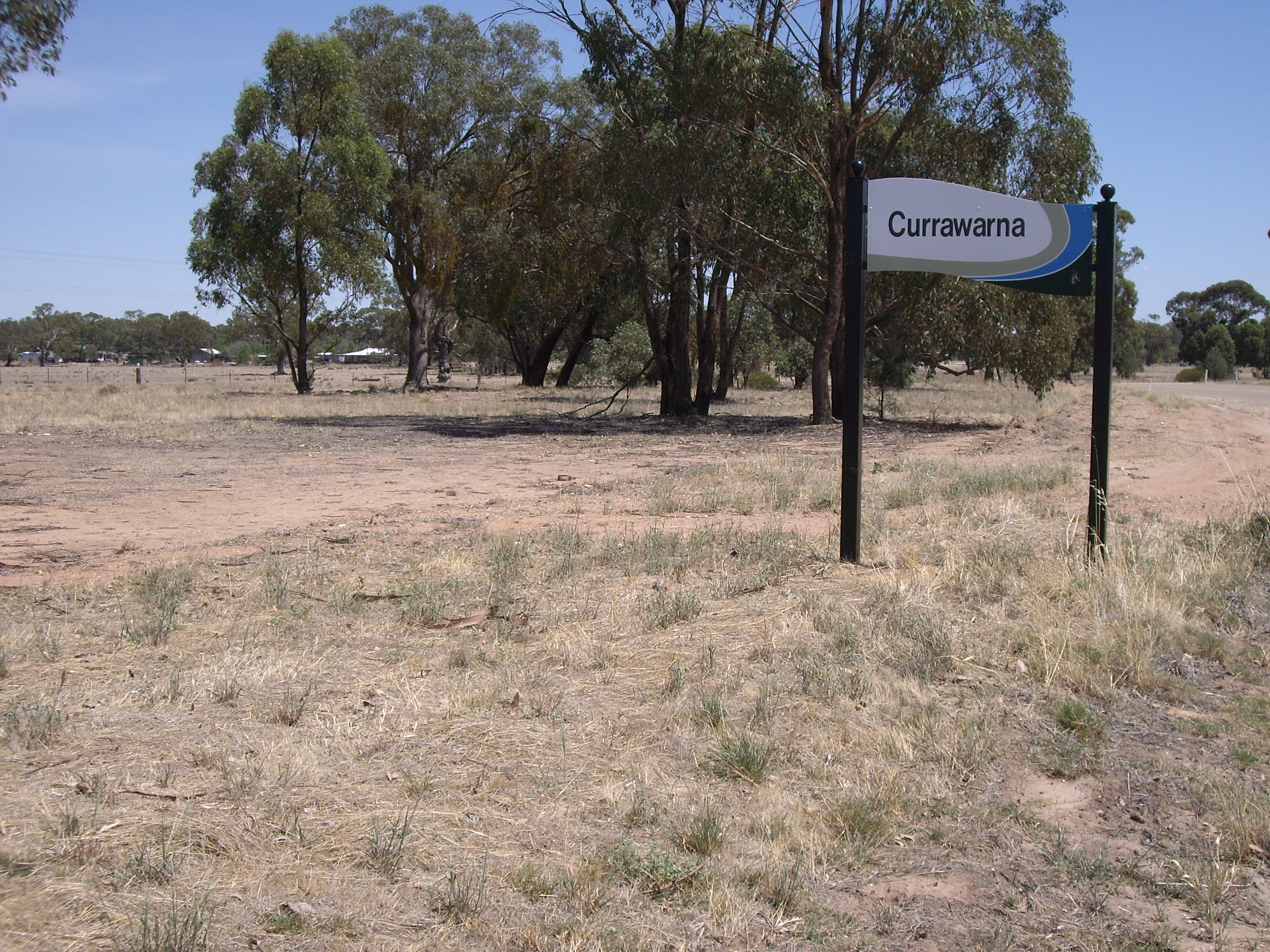
- Entering Currawarna

- Coordinates: 35°01′S 147°04′E
- Country: Australia
- State: New South Wales
- LGA: City of Wagga Wagga
- Location: 6 km (3.7 mi) from Millwood; 32 km (20 mi) from Coolamon

Government
  - State electorate: Wagga Wagga
- Elevation: 180 m (590 ft)

Population
  - Total: 189 (2016 census)
- Postcode: 2650
- County: Bourke

Currawarna is a rural community in the central east part of the Riverina. It is situated by road, about 6 kilometres north west of Millwood and 32 kilometres south of Coolamon. At the 2016 census, Currawarna had a population of 189 people.

The place name Currawarna is derived from the Wiradjuri aboriginal language meaning "pine tree".

Currawarna Post Office opened on 1 August 1899 and closed in 1979.

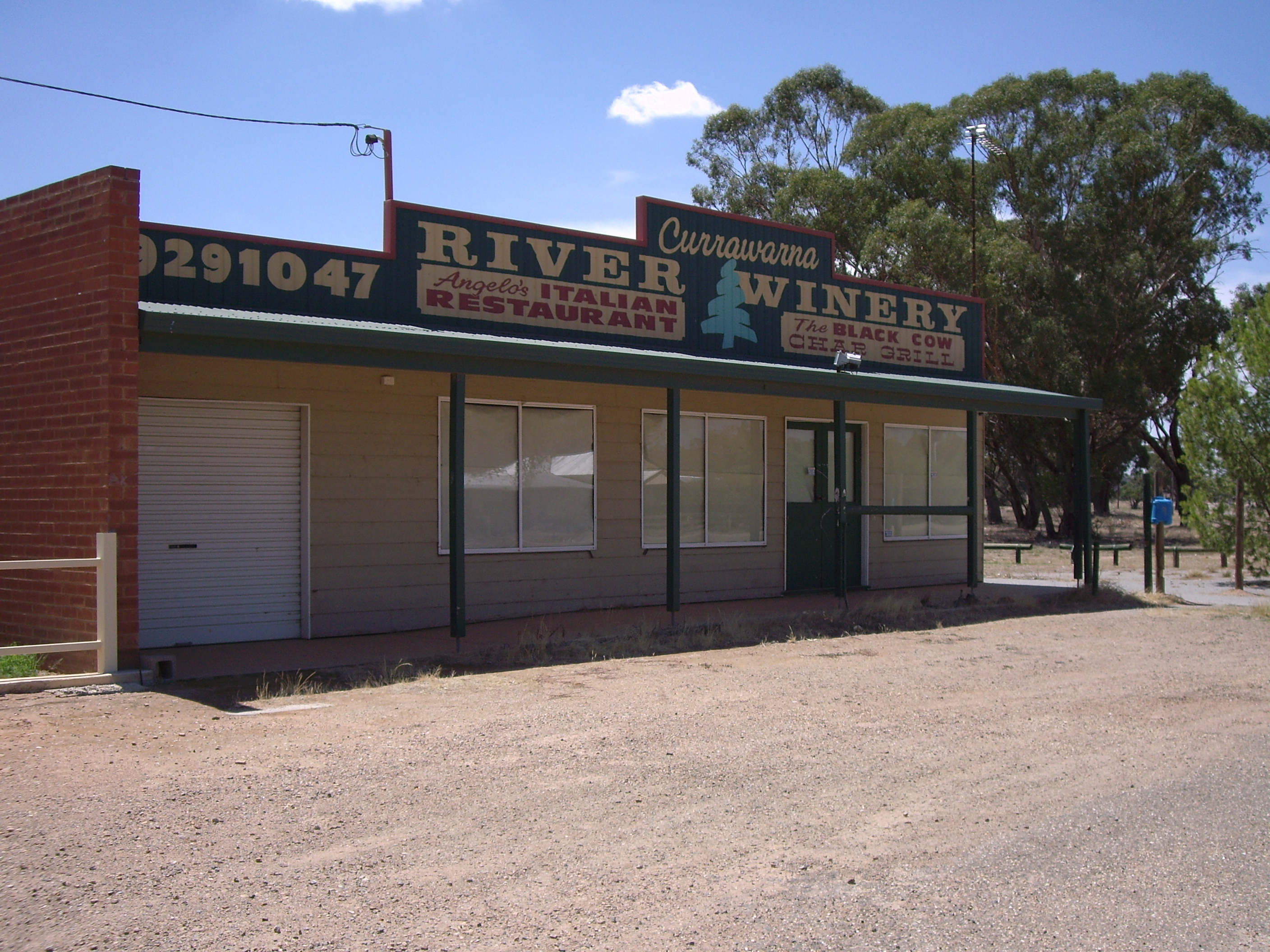
Currawarna River Winery & restaurants
