= Rannock, New South Wales =

Rannock New South Wales
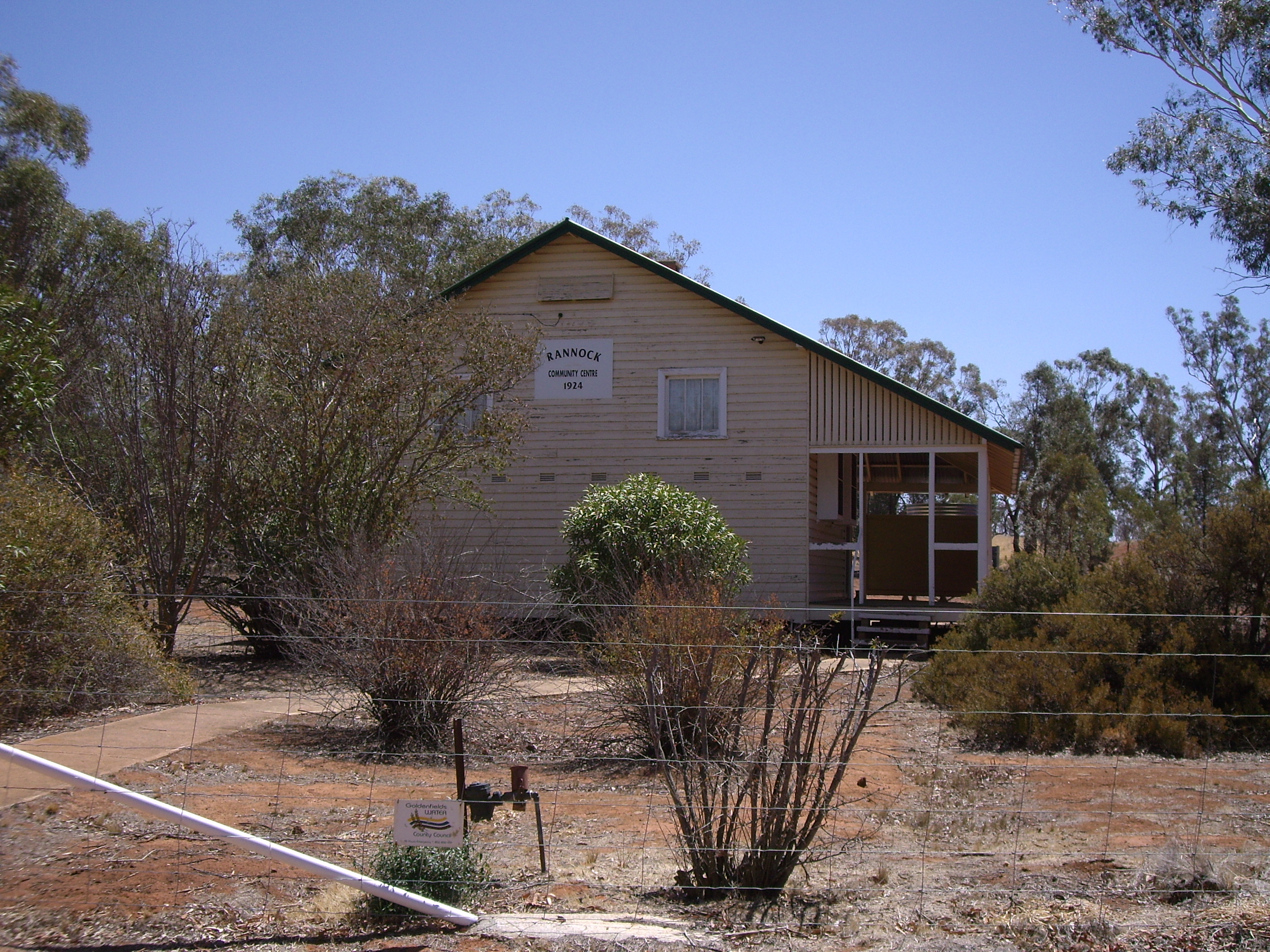
- Rannock Community Centre

- Coordinates: 34°36′32″S 147°15′50″E
- Population: 78 (2021 census)
- Postcode(s): 2701
- Elevation: 306 m (1,004 ft)
- Location: 468 km (291 mi) SW of Sydney; 73 km (45 mi) N of Wagga Wagga; 45 km (28 mi) SW of Temora; 23 km (14 mi) N of Coolamon
- LGA(s): Coolamon Shire
- County: Bourke
- State electorate(s): Cootamundra
- Federal division(s): Riverina

Rannock is a rural community in the central north part of the Riverina. It is situated by road, about 14 kilometres (8.7 mi) east of Methul and 23 kilometres (14 mi) north of Coolamon. At the 2021 census, Rannock had a population of 78 people.

Rannock Post Office opened on 21 December 1908 and closed in 1970.

== Gallery ==
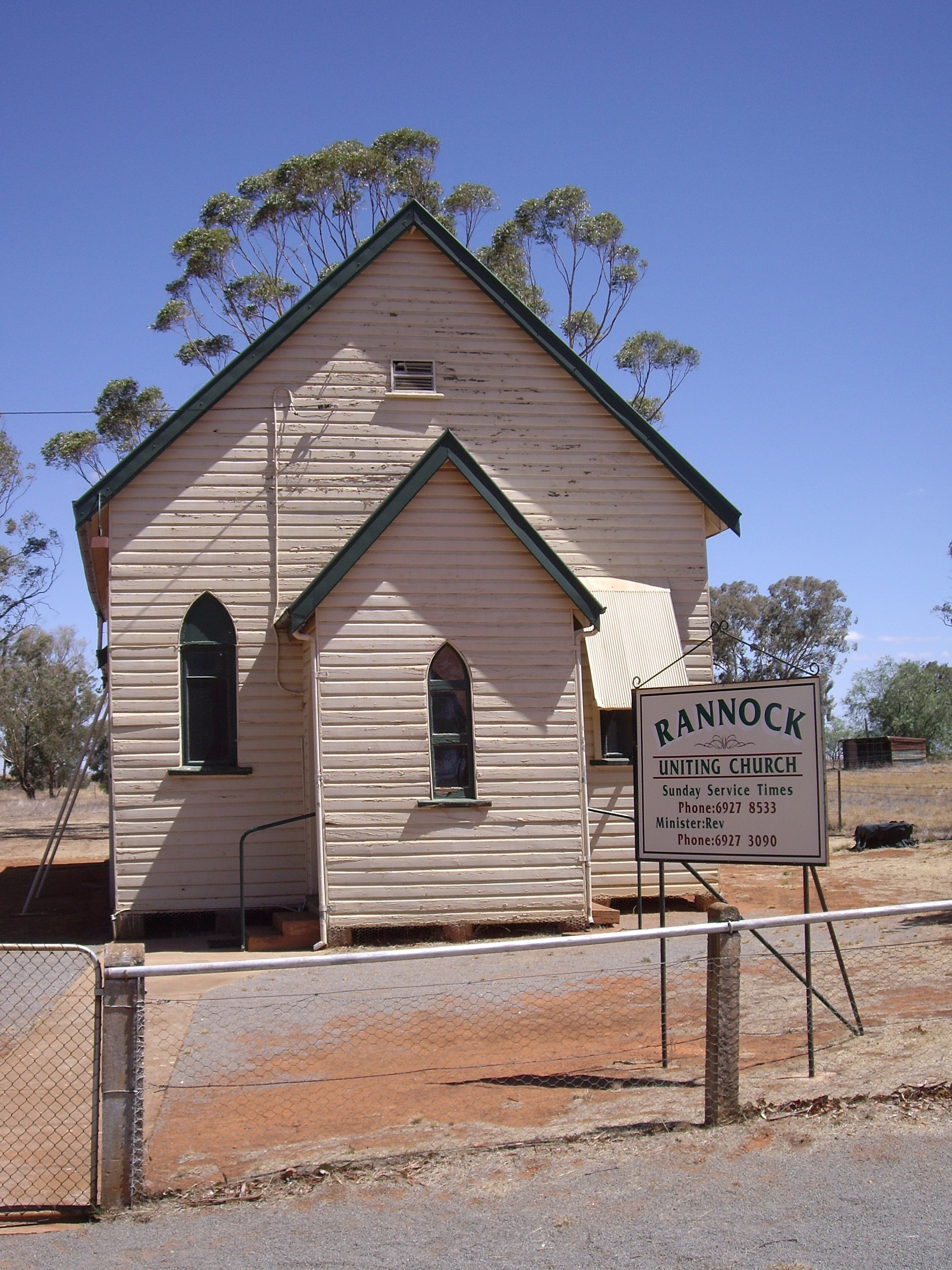
Uniting Church Rannock
