= Walleroobie, New South Wales =

Walleroobie
- Town
- Coordinates: 34°26′S 146°53′E
- Country: Australia
- State: New South Wales
- LGA: Coolamon Shire Council
- Location: 497 km (309 mi) SW of Sydney; 100 km (62 mi) NW of Wagga Wagga; 25 km (16 mi) SE of Ardlethan

Government
  - State electorate: Murrumbidgee
  - Federal division: Riverina

Population
  - Total: 53 (2021 census)
- Postcode: 2665
- County: Bourke

Walleroobie is a locality in the north-east part of the Riverina region of south-west New South Wales, Australia. It is situated, by road, about 15 kilometres (9.3 mi) north-east of Cowabbie and 19 kilometres (12 mi) south-east of Ardlethan.

Ernest Enoch Barker is said to have built the original soldier settler cottages in Walleroobie from 1920 to 1927, being paid £100 a room and £100 for the roof.

At the 2021 census, Walleroobie had a population of 53.
