= Merv Brooks =

Australian rules footballer

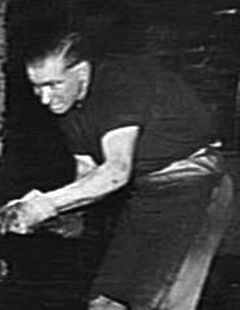
- Merv Brooks working as a blacksmith in Sunshine

Personal information
- Full name: Mervyn Francis Brooks
- Born: 19 January 1919; Ariah Park, New South Wales
- Died: 19 August 2011 (aged 92); Moonee Ponds, Victoria
- Original team: Sunshine
- Height: 182 cm (6 ft 0 in)
- Weight: 75 kg (165 lb)
- Position: Half back

Playing career^{1}
Years	Club	Games (Goals)
1943–1944	Fitzroy	2 (0)
- ^{1} Playing statistics correct to the end of 1944.

Mervyn Francis Brooks (19 January 1919 – 19 August 2011) was an Australian rules football player who played two games for Fitzroy Football Club in 1943 and 1944. He also played for Preston in the Victorian Football Association (VFA).
