= Methul, New South Wales =

Methul New South Wales
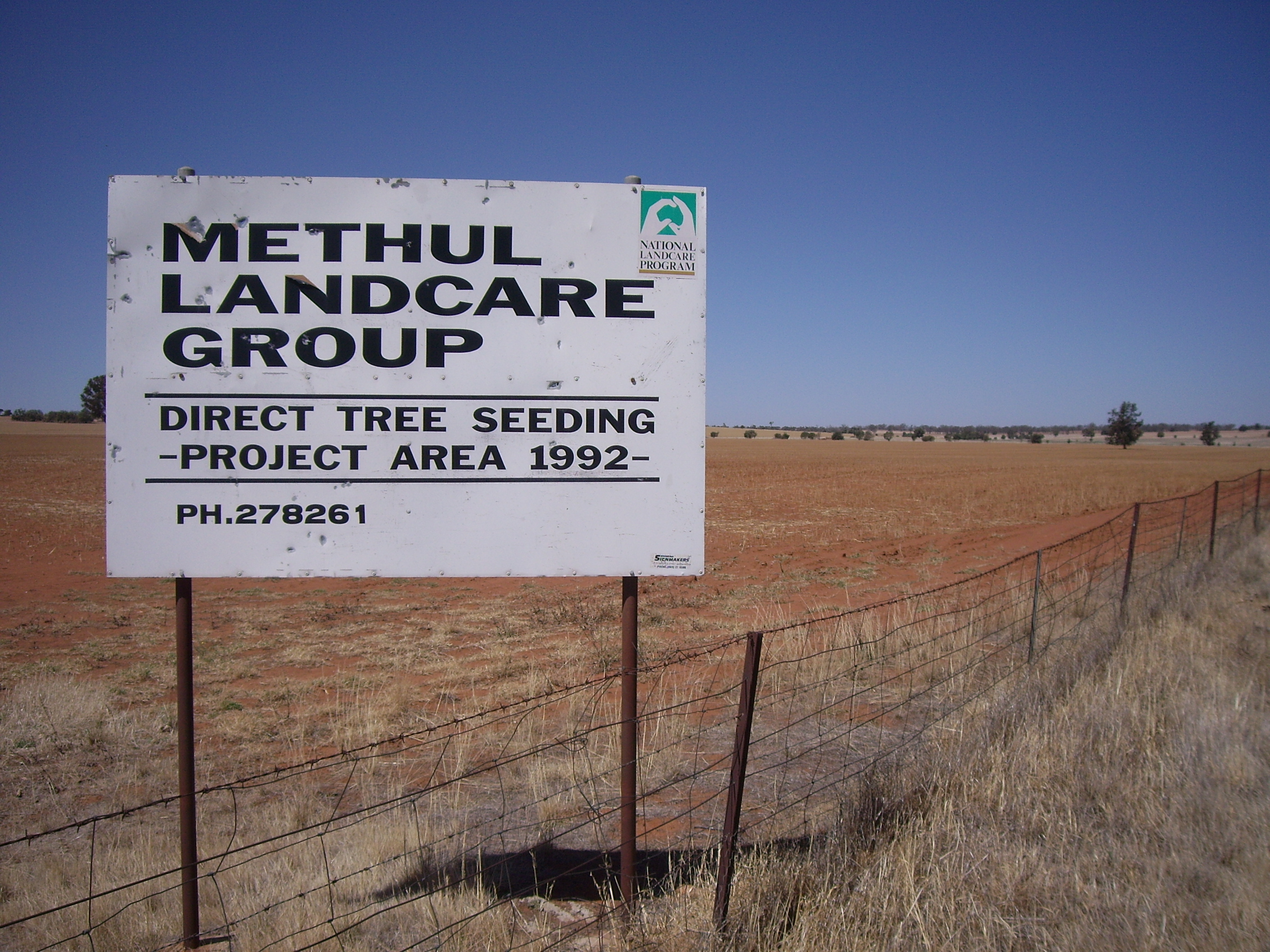
- Methul is red soil wheat country in the Riverina

- Coordinates: 34°36′S 147°09′E
- Population: 60 (SAL 2021)
- Postcode(s): 2701
- Elevation: 275 m (902 ft)
- Location: 474 km (295 mi) SW of Sydney; 79 km (49 mi) NW of Wagga Wagga; 27 km (17 mi) N of Coolamon
- LGA(s): Coolamon Shire
- County: Cooper
- State electorate(s): Cootamundra
- Federal division(s): Riverina

Methul is a locality in the central north part of the Riverina region of south west New South Wales, Australia. It is situated by road, about 14 kilometres (8.7 mi) west of Rannock and 34 kilometres (21 mi) south of Ariah Park.
