= Cowabbie =

- Town
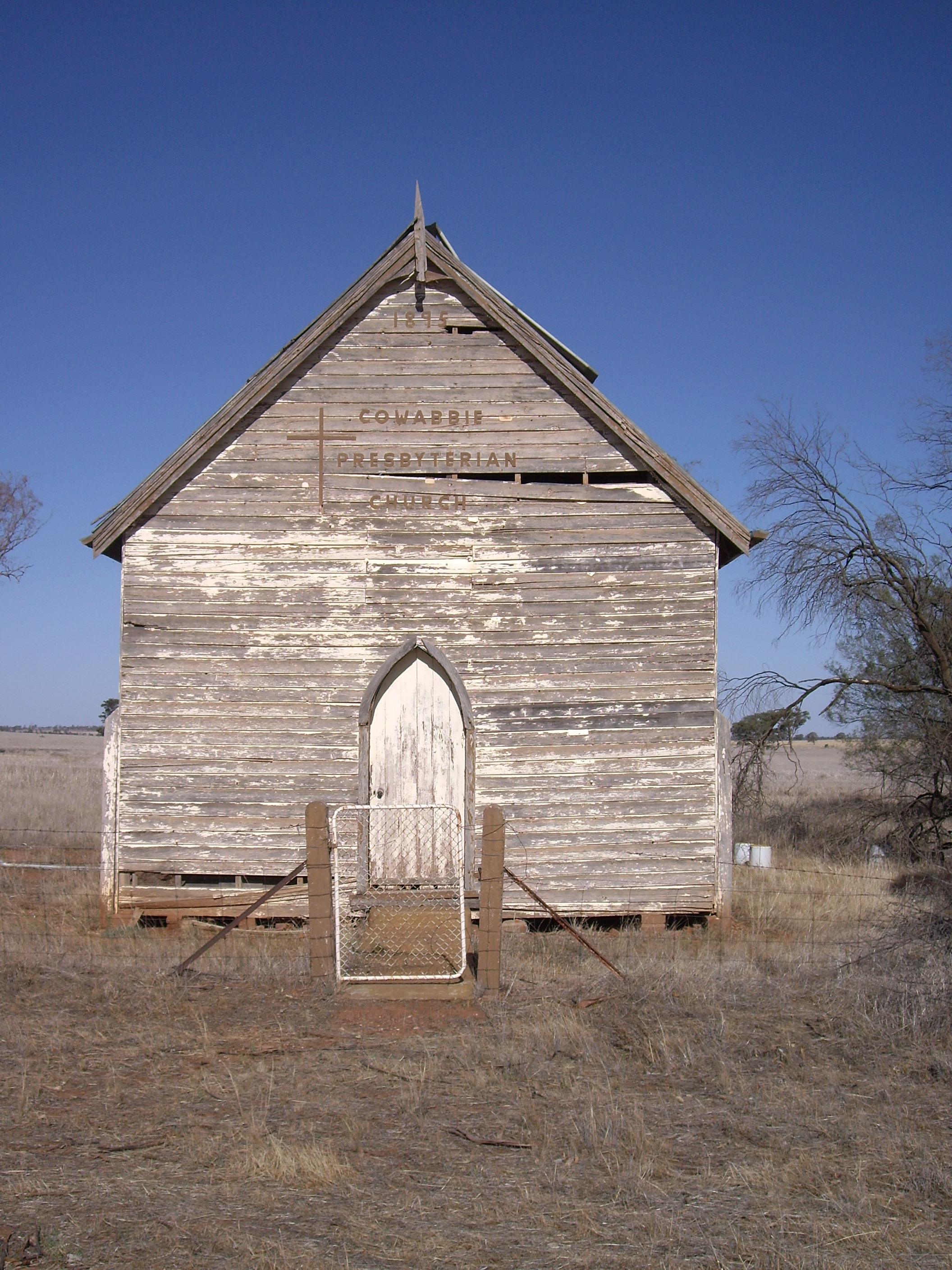
- Cowabbie Presbyterian Church

- Coordinates: 34°36′0″S 147°0′36″E
- Country: Australia
- State: New South Wales
- LGA: Coolamon Shire Council
- Location: 504 km (313 mi) SW of Sydney; 74 km (46 mi) NW of Wagga Wagga; 34 km (21 mi) NW of Coolamon

Government
  - State electorate: Cootamundra
  - Federal division: Riverina

Population
  - Total: 16 (SAL 2021)
- Postcode: 2663
- County: Bourke

Cowabbie is a rural community in the central part of the Riverina region of New South Wales, Australia. It is situated by road about 29 kilometres (18 mi) south of Ardlethan and 32 kilometres (20 mi) north of Matong along the Wagga Wagga road.

The place name Cowabbie is derived from expression used by the local Aboriginals for cows when they were first seen in the area by these early inhabitants, and Cowabbie Station is one of the functioning properties in the area.

Cowabbie has a rich Presbyterian history. The original church – dilapidated but memorialised by the small community surrounding it, was first built by the local Hannah family in 1865 and then transported to its current location by bullock-team in 1926.
