= Barellan & District Football League =

The Barellan & District Football League was an Australian rules football competition played in the vicinity of Barellan, New South Wales from 1911 until 1971.

The league folded in 1971 after three of its clubs merged and left, another two followed in leaving, and the remaining two folded.

== Clubs ==
=== Final clubs ===
Club	Colors	Nickname	Home Ground	Former League	Est.	Years in B&DFL	Known B&DFL Senior Premierships		Fate
Club	Colors	Nickname	Home Ground	Former League	Est.	Years in B&DFL	Total	Years	Fate
Barellan United		Kangaroos	Barellan Sportsground, Barellan	–	1970	1970-1971	1	1971	Fielded thirds team in South West District FL in 1972. Seniors re-formed in Central Riverina FL in 1973
Coleambally		Blues	Coleambally Sports Grounds, Coleambally	–	1965	1965-1971	0	-	Moved to Coreen & District FA in 1972
Darlington Point		Point	Darlington Point Recreation Ground, Darlington Point	SWDFL	1906	1956-1960, 1962-1968, 1970-1971	0	-	Recess in 1961 and 1969. Folded after 1971 season
Hay		Rovers	Hay Recreation Reserve, Hay	ERFL	1937	1962-1971	0	-	Split to form 4 local clubs in Hay in 1972, re-formed in Mid-Murray FL in 1975
Yanco		Penguins	Yanco Sportsground, Yanco	SWDFL	1918	1955, 1962-1971	3	1968, 1969, 1970	Recess between 1956-61. Folded after 1971 season
Yoogali		Navy Blues	Henderson Oval, Yoogali	–	1971	1971	0	-	Moved to Northern Riverina FL in 1972

=== Former clubs ===
Club	Colors	Nickname	Home Ground	Former League	Est.	Years in B&DFL	B&DFL Senior Premierships		Fate
Club	Colors	Nickname	Home Ground	Former League	Est.	Years in B&DFL	Total	Years	Fate
Ardlethan	Blue (1930s)(?-1955)	Blues (1930s)	Ardlethan Recreation Ground, Ardlethan	BBDFA, ADFA, AP&DFA	1907	1912-1915, 1924-1926, 1935, 1937, 1950-1955	3	1912, 1952, 1953	Played in Beckom-Barellan District FA between 1919-23. Moved to Ariah Park & District FA in 1927. Recess in 1936 and 1938-46. Re-formed in Ariah Park & District FA in 1948. Folded after 1955 season
Barellan (Barellan-Moombooldool 1952)	(1923-?)(?-1954)	Blue & Whites	Barellan Sportsground, Barellan	BBDFA, AP&DFA	1910	1911-1915, 1923-1927, 1929-1954	5	1911, 1914, 1923, 1933, 1947	Played in Beckom-Barellan District FA between 1919-22. Played merged with Moombooldool in Ariah Park & District FA in 1928. Merged with Binya to form Barellan-Binya after 1954 season.
Barellan-Binya		Combines	Barellan Sportsground, Barellan	–	1955	1955-1969	4	1957, 1961, 1966, 1967	Merged with Kamarah-Moombooldool and Sandy Creek to form Barellan United after 1969 season
Beelbangera		Bangers	Beelbangera Reserve, Beelbangera	LDFL	1950	1951-1961	0	-	Merged with Yenda to form Beelbangera-Yenda United in 1962
Beckom	(1960)(1968)		Beckom Recreation Ground, Beckom	T&DFA, ADFA, AP&DFA	1919	1925-1926, 1935-1936, 1950-1963, 1965-1968	3	1951, 1958, 1960	Played in Ardlethan & District FA between 1927-34. Moved to Ariah Park & District FA in 1937. Recess in 1964. Folded after 1968 season
Binya			Binya Recreation Ground, Binya	GDFA, AP&DFA	1921	1923-1927, 1929-1954	5	1934, 1935, 1936, 1937, 1938	Played in Ariah Park & District FA in 1928. Merged with Barellan to form Barellan-Binya after 1954 season
Garoolgan				–	1927	1927	0	-	Folded after 1927 season
Griffith		Tigers	Griffith Exies Oval, Griffith	MIAFL	1914	1929-1930	0	-	Moved to Leeton & District FA in 1931
Kamarah			Kamarah Recreation Ground, Kamarah	BBDFA, AP&DFA	1911	1911, 1914-1915, 1924-1926, 1929-1932, 1935-1954	6	1924, 1925, 1926, 1929, 1930, 1931	Recess in 1912-13. Played in Ariah Park & District FA in 1927-28. Played in Ardlethan District FA in 1933-34. Merged with Moombooldool to form Kamarah-Moombooldool after 1954 season
Kamarah-Moombooldool			Kamarah Recreation Ground, Kamarah	–	1955	1955-1970	0	-	Merged with Barellan-Binya and Sandy Creek to form Barellan United after 1969 season
Moombooldool (Erin 1911)		Greens	Moombooldool Ground, Moombooldool	BBDFA	1911	1911-1915, 1923, 1925-1927, 1929, 1932-1951	7	1927, 1939, 1940, 1946, 1948, 1949, 1950	Played in Beckom-Barellan District FA between 1919-22. Played merged with Barellan in Ariah Park & District FA in 1928. Recess in 1930-31 and 1952-54. Played merged with Barellan in 1952. Merged with Kamarah to form Kamarah-Moombooldool after 1954 season.
Rankins Springs			Rankins Springs Recreation Ground, Rankins Springs	NRFL	1949	1959-1960	0	-	Returned to Northern Riverina FL in 1961
Sandy Creek			Sandy Creek Sports Ground, Barellan	–	1933	1933-1934, 1936, 1946-1969	8	1954, 1955, 1956, 1959, 1962, 1963, 1964, 1965	Recess in 1935 and 1937-45. Merged with Barellan-Binya and Kamarah-Moombooldool to form Barellan United after 1969 season
Tallimba			Tallimba Recreation Ground, Tallimba			1957-1961	0	-	Recess between 1962-79, re-formed in Northern Riverina FL in 1980
Yalgogrin				–	1911	1911-1913	0	-	Folded after 1913 season
Yenda (Beelbangera-Yenda United 1962)			Yenda Oval, Yenda	GDFA, LDFA	1919	1930-1931, 1960-1968	0	-	Moved to Griffith District FA in 1932. Folded after 1968 season

== Premiers ==
Year	Premier	Score	Runners-up	Notes
1911	Barellan			
1912	Ardlethan			
1913	Barellan or Ardlethan			
1914	Barellan			
1915	?			
1916-1922	Recess			
1923	Barellan			
1924	Kamarah	6.6 (42) - 2.7 (19)	Barellan	
1925	Kamarah			
1926	Kamarah	5.6 (36) - 4.10 (34)	Binya	
1927	Moomboolbool	Margin 4 points	Barellan	
1928	Recess			
1929	Kamarah			
1930	Kamarah	Margin 15 points	Binya	
1931	Kamarah	?.? (40) - ?.? (20)	Binya	
1932	?			
1933	Barellan		Sandy Creek	
1934	Binya	11.15 (81) - 5.7 (37)	Barellan	
1935	Binya			
1936	Binya	4.12 (36) - 5.5 (35)	Barellan	
1937	Binya	19.22 (136) - 5.7 (37)	Moombooldool	
1938	Binya	?.? (64) - ?.? (38)	Kamarah	
1939	Moombooldool			
1940	Moombooldool			
1941-45	Recess			
1946	Moombooldool			
1947	Barellan			
1948	Moombooldool			
1949	Moombooldool			
1950	Moombooldool	6.8 (44) - 3.10 (28)	Beckom	
1951	Beckom	9.15 (69) - 8.8 (56)	Moombooldool	
1952	Ardlethan	13.11 (89) - 9.11 (65)	Kamarah	
1953	Ardlethan	13.11 (89) - 9.8 (62)	Beckom	
1954	Sandy Creek	10.14 (74) - 8.10 (58)	Barellan	
1955	Sandy Creek	9.10 (64) - 8.12 (60)	Barellan-Binya	
1956	Sandy Creek	12.7 (79) - 11.13 (79)	Beelbangera	Drawn grand final
1956	Sandy Creek	7.9 (51) - 2.14 (26)	Beelbangera	Replay
1957	Barellan-Binya			
1958	Beckom	7.11 (53) - 5.8 (38)	Darlington Point	
1959	Sandy Creek	7.13 (55) - 6.7 (43)	Beckom	
1960	Beckom	10.6 (66) - 4.18 (42)	Sandy Creek	
1961	Barellan-Binya	14.13 (97) - 9.9 (63)	Beckom	
1962	Sandy Creek	9.11 (65) - 2.11 (23)	Barellan-Binya	
1963	Sandy Creek	9.13 (67) - 9.11 (65)	Hay Rovers	
1964	Sandy Creek	9.3 (57) - 7.8 (50)	Barellan-Binya	
1965	Sandy Creek	17.13 (115) - 16.10 (106)	Barellan-Binya	
1966	Barellan-Binya	16.9 (105) - 9.9 (63)	Darlington Point	
1967	Barellan-Binya	13.12 (90) - 7.14 (56)	Yanco	
1968	Yanco	11.11 (77) - 4.9 (33)	Barellan-Binya	
1969	Yanco	10.17 (77) - 8.11 (59)	Hay Rovers	
1970	Yanco	18.13 (121) - 10.8 (68)	Barellan United	
1971	Barellan United	16.10 (106) - 6.14 (50)	Hay Rovers	

== Aftermath ==
Coleambally and Barellan United (formed from the merger of Barellan-Binya and Kamarah-Moombooldool) continue to play in the present day in the Farrer Football League. After playing intra-club football from 1971 to 1981, the Hay Rovers joined the Golden Rivers Football League in 1982 as the Hay Lions and play in that continue to play in that competition at present.

After their Australian rules club folded, Darlington Point continued to field teams in the Group 20 Rugby League competition, amalgamating with Coleambally's team in 1973. Meanwhile, following the demise of the Yanco Penguins Australian Football Club, the nearby Wamoon RLFC relocated to the town as Yanco-Wamoon in 1970 and continues to play in the Group 20 competition in that code also.

The locality of Sandy Creek no longer has any sporting teams.

== See also ==
- South West Football League (New South Wales)
- Farrer Football League
- Group 17 Rugby League
- Group 20 Rugby League
