= Bectric =

Bectric New South Wales
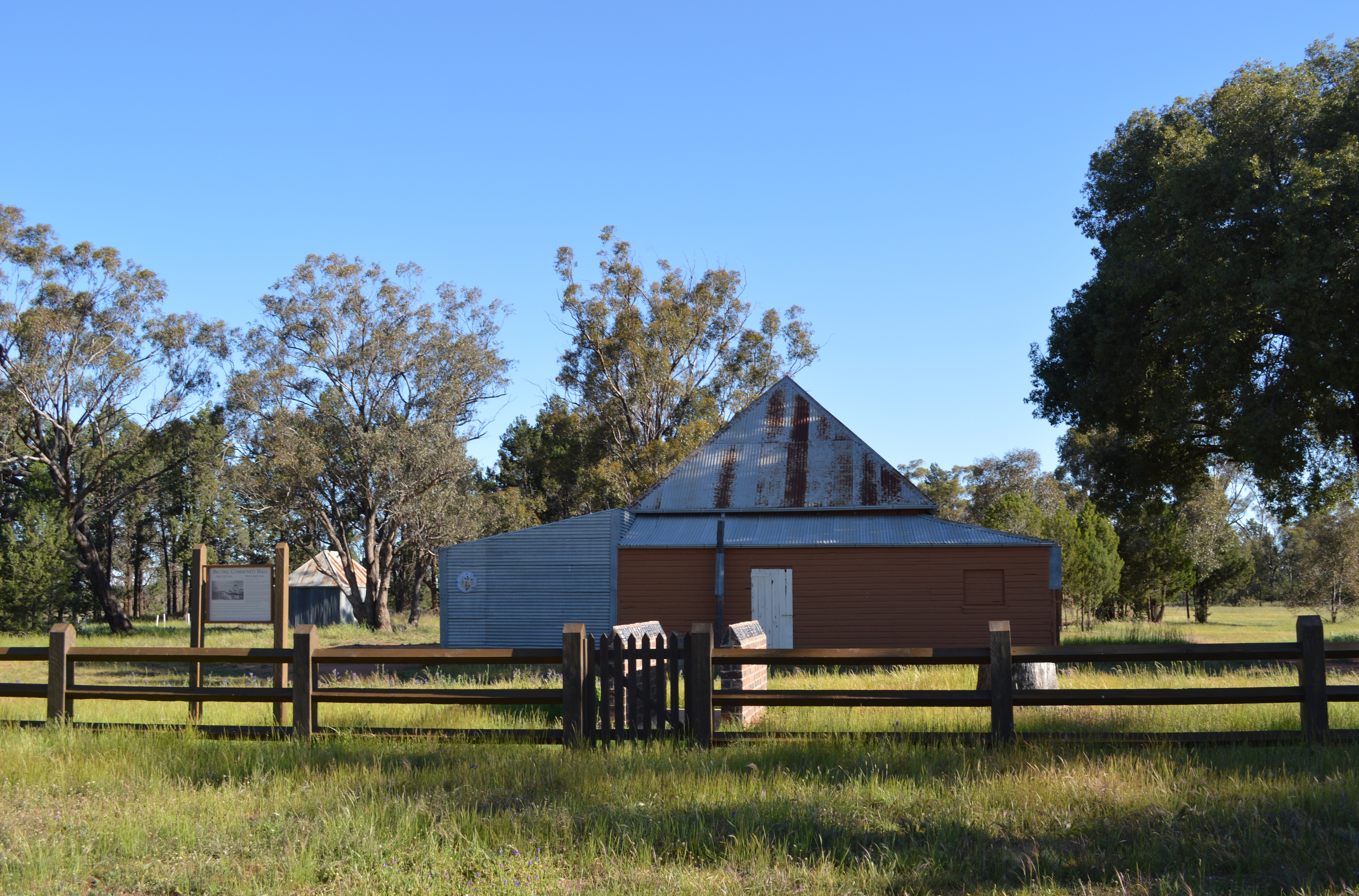
- Community Hall at Bectric

- Coordinates: 34°29′S 147°14′E
- Population: 54 (2016 census)
- Postcode(s): 2665
- Location: 454 km (282 mi) SW of Sydney; 81 km (50 mi) N of Wagga Wagga; 25 km (16 mi) SW of Temora
- LGA(s): Temora Shire
- State electorate(s): Cootamundra
- Federal division(s): Riverina

Bectric is a locality in the Riverina region of New South Wales, Australia. The locality is in the Temora Shire, 431 kilometres (268 mi) west of the state capital, Sydney.

At the 2016 census, Bectric had a population of 54.
