= Millwood, New South Wales =

Millwood New South Wales
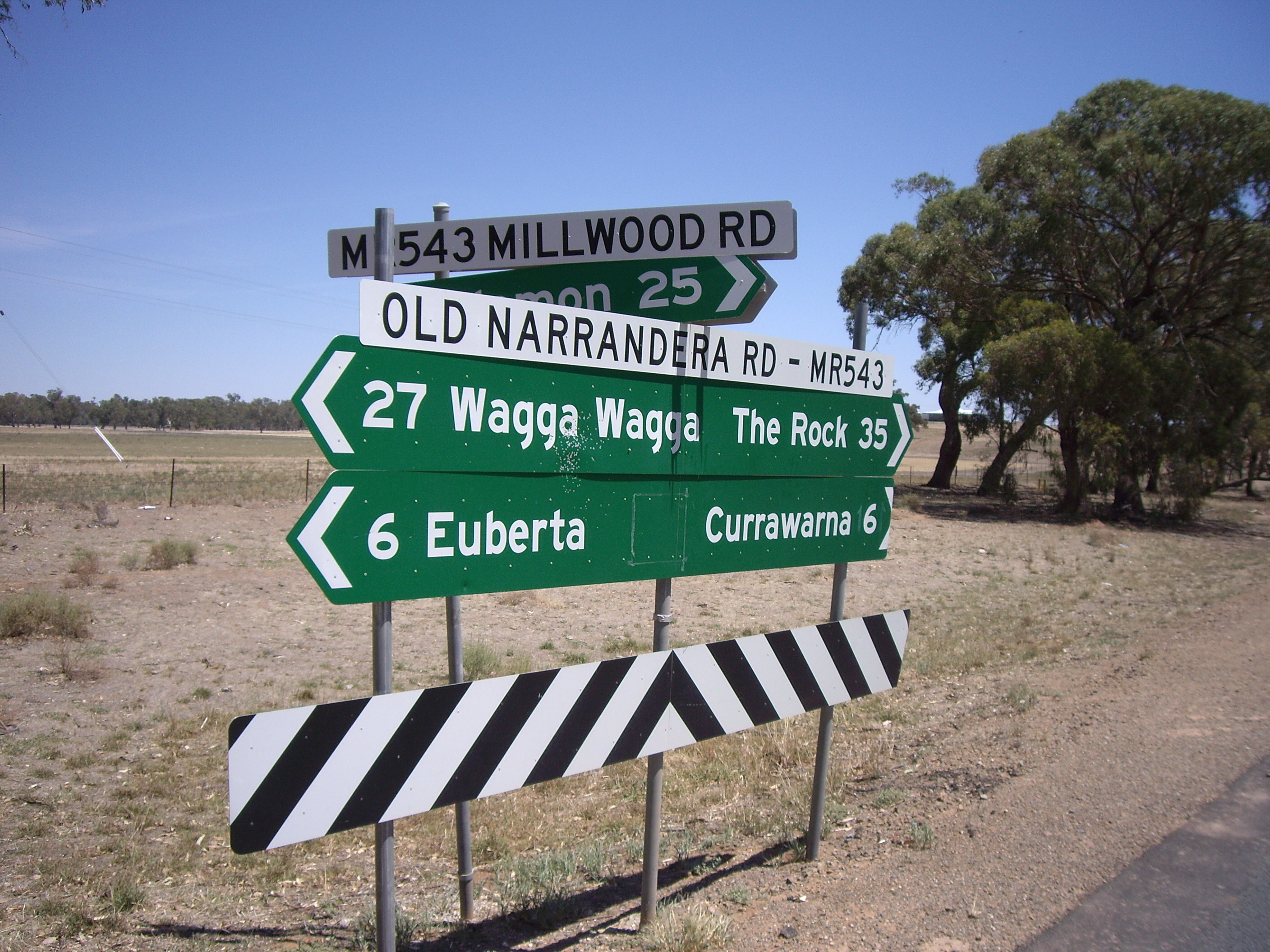
- Intersection at Millwood

- Coordinates: 35°01′16″S 147°08′41″E
- Postcode(s): 2650
- Elevation: 233 m (764 ft)
- Location: 6 km (4 mi) from Currawarnaa; 26 km (16 mi) from Coolamon
- LGA(s): City of Wagga Wagga
- County: Bourke
- State electorate(s): Wagga Wagga

Millwood is a rural community in the central east part of the Riverina. It is situated by road, about 6 kilometres south east from Currawarna and 26 kilometres south from Coolamon.

Millwood Post Office opened on 20 September 1898 and closed in 1918.

== Gallery ==
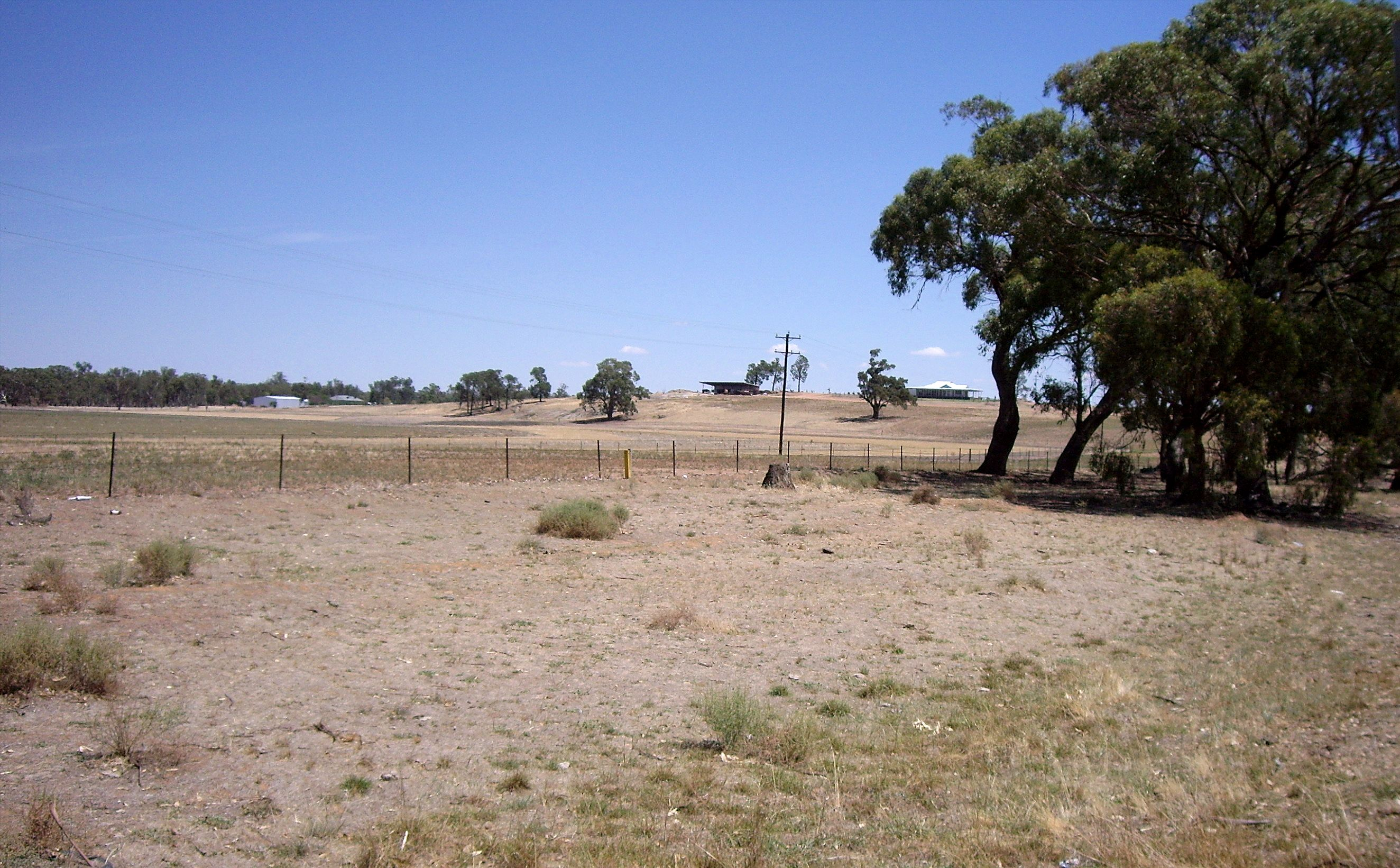
A rural property at Millwood

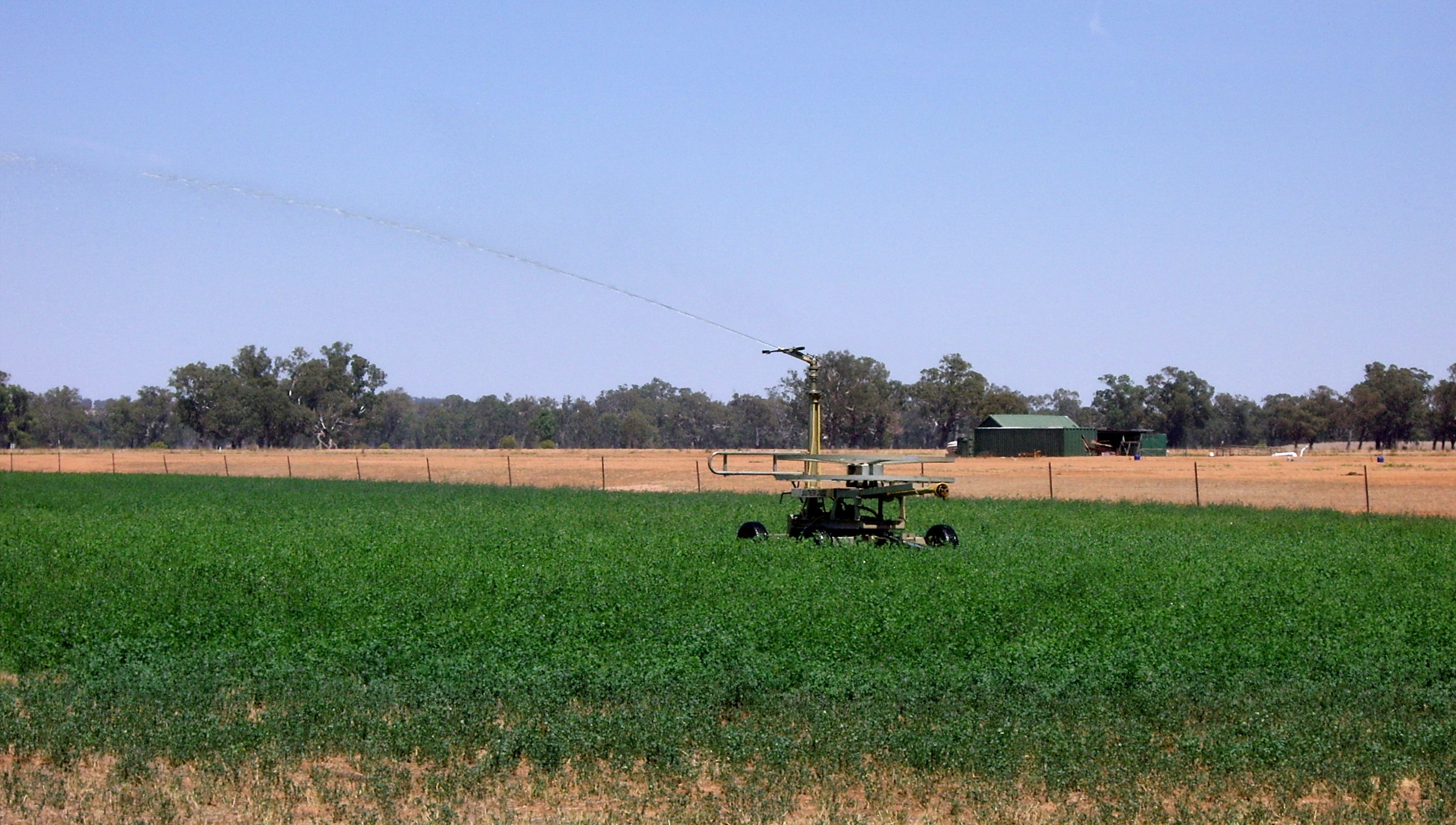
Impact irrigation at Millwood
