= Ariah Park =

- Town
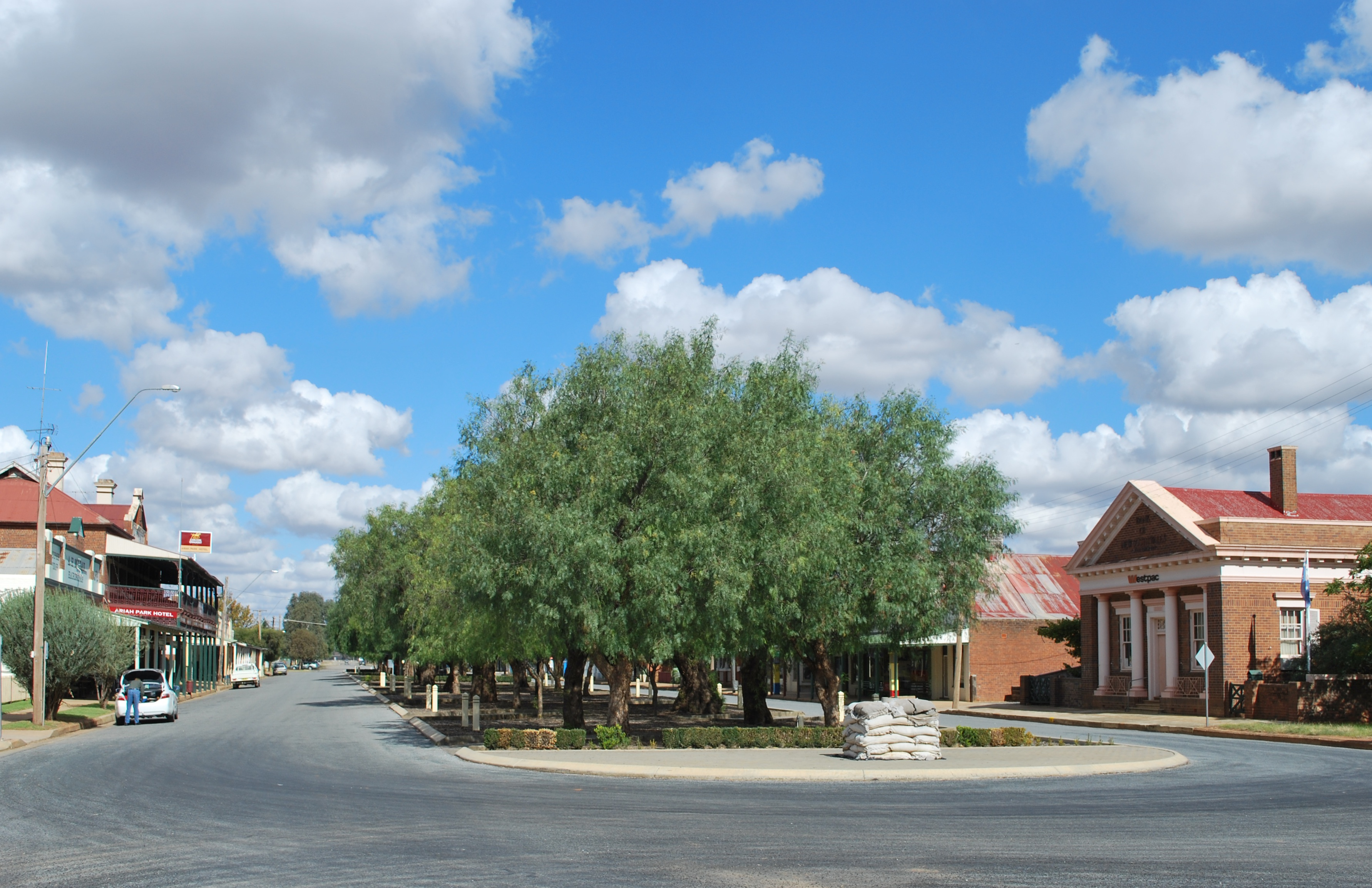
- Coolamon Street, the main street of Ariah Park

- Coordinates: 34°19′0″S 147°13′0″E
- Country: Australia
- State: New South Wales
- LGA: Temora Shire
- Location: 459 km (285 mi) from Sydney; 98 km (61 mi) from Wagga Wagga; 35 km (22 mi) from Temora; 18 km (11 mi) from Mirrool

Government
  - State electorate: Cootamundra
  - Federal division: Riverina
- Elevation: 316 m (1,037 ft)

Population
  - Total: 272 (2021 census)
- Postcode: 2665
- County: Bourke

Ariah Park (/ˈɛəriə/) is a small town in the Riverina region of New South Wales, Australia, 35 kilometres (22 mi) west of Temora and 65 kilometres (40 mi) south of West Wyalong. The town is within the Temora Shire near Burley Griffin Way. On Census night 2021, Ariah Park had a population of 272. The town is listed by the National Trust as a Conservation Area.

The town's name came from resident Sam Harrison who purchased a portion of the Wellman Estate and then named that portion Ariah Park (pronounced 'area'). The name is derived from the anglicisation of the Wiradjuri (local Aboriginal language) word "narriyar", meaning "hot".

Tourist information makes reference to the town being known for its 'wowsers, bowsers and peppercorn trees'. A wowser is an Australian word describing a "mealy-mouthed hypocrite, a pious prude, one who condemns or seeks to curtail the pleasures of others or who works to have their own rigid morality enforced on all, one who prefers not to consume alcohol". A bowser refers to the everyday machine used to pump petrol or diesel into a vehicle, of which many antique examples can be seen on the main street. The peppercorn tree is a common variety of which many specimens populate the main street.

The settlement was first established in 1850. Ariah Park was connected to the Main Southern railway line via Temora in 1906. The village was gazetted the year after this connection and flourished at the expense of the nearby settlement of Broken Dam. Ariah Park Post Office had opened earlier on 26 August 1903. The peppercorn trees were planted in 1916 and railway silos built in 1919.

The district produces sheep and wheat. New South Wales Government Railways launched its first bulk-wheat loading operation in the town in 1916.

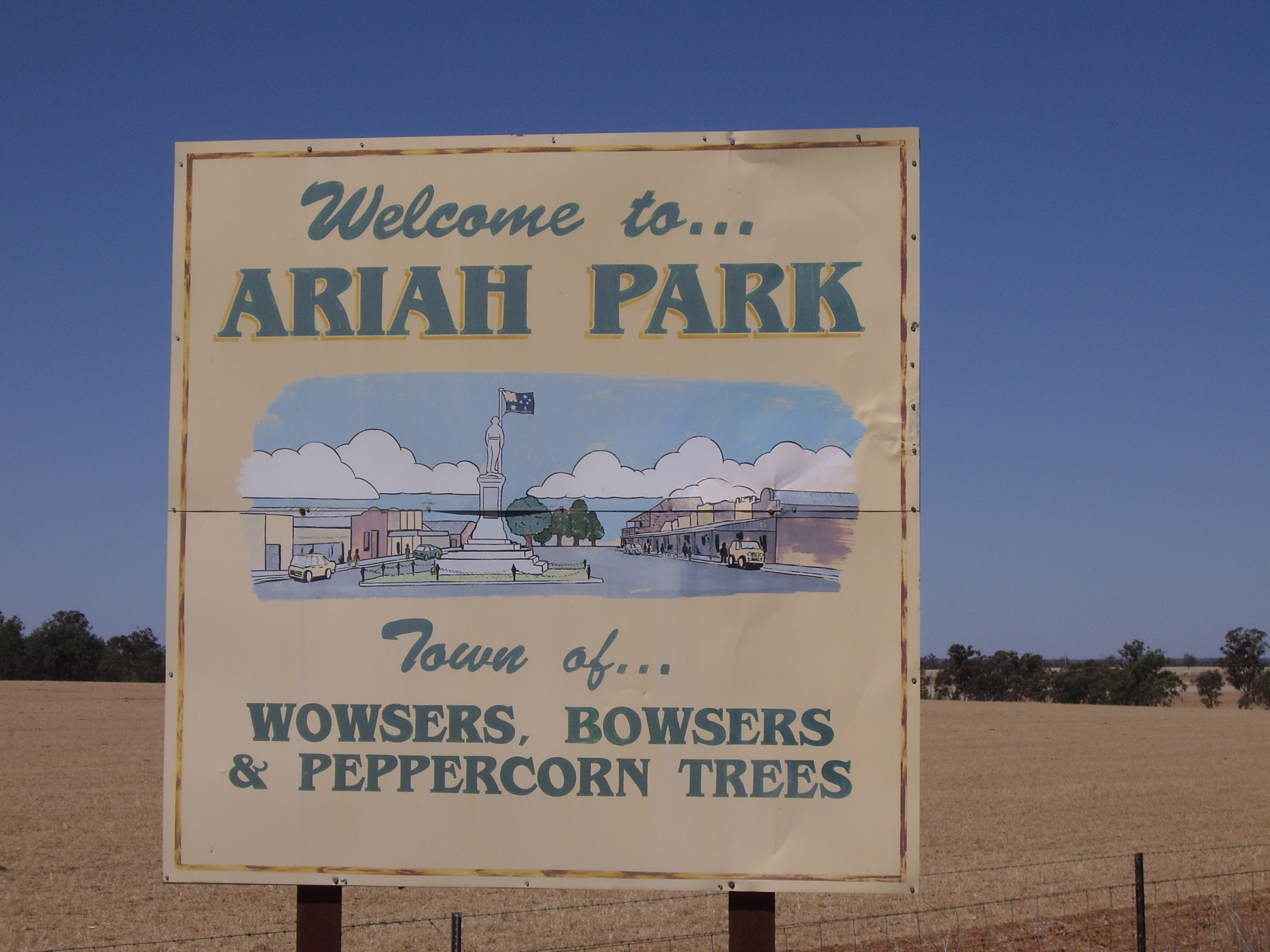
Entering Ariah Park

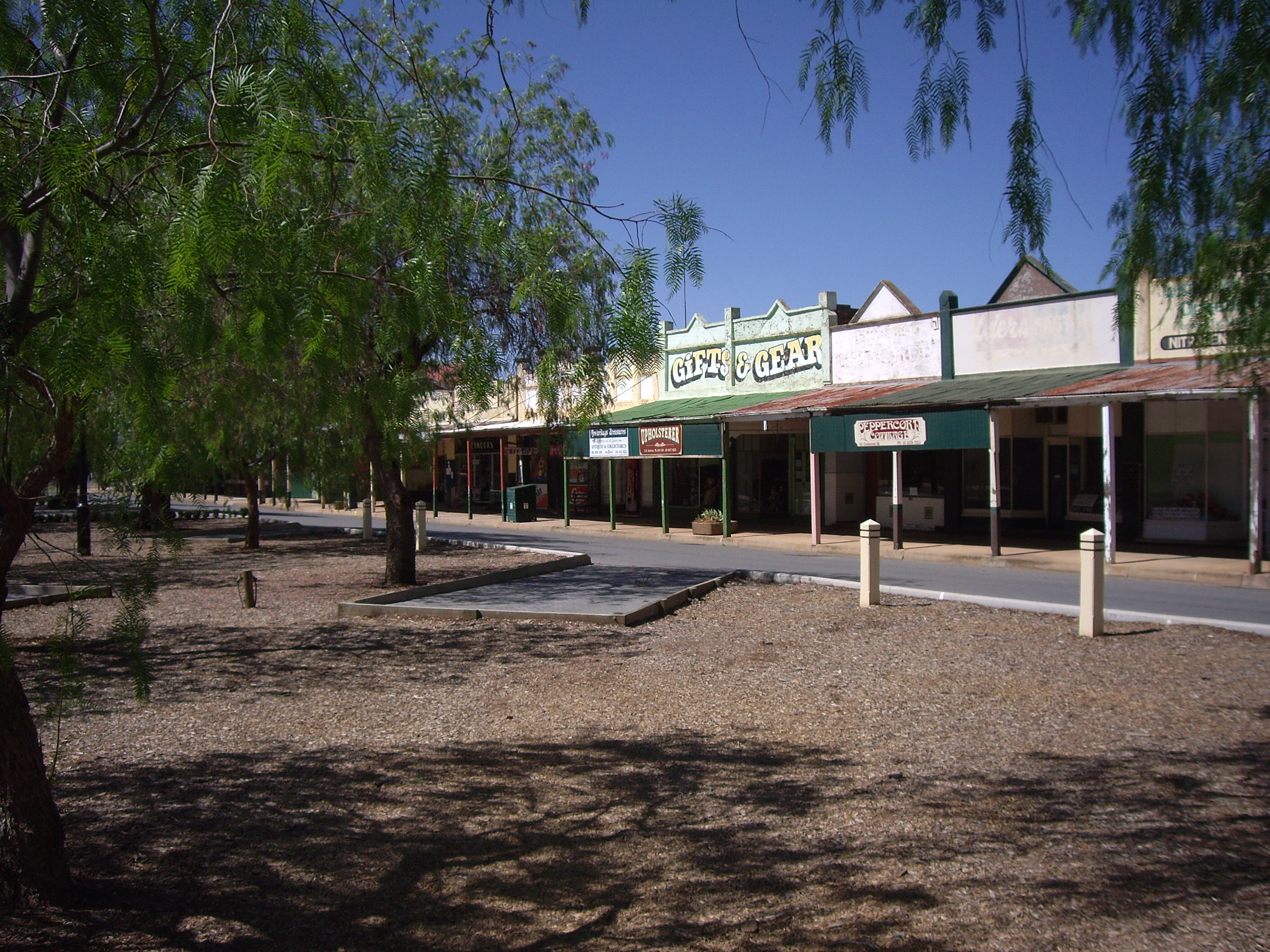
One side of the main street of Ariah Park – note the peppercorn trees

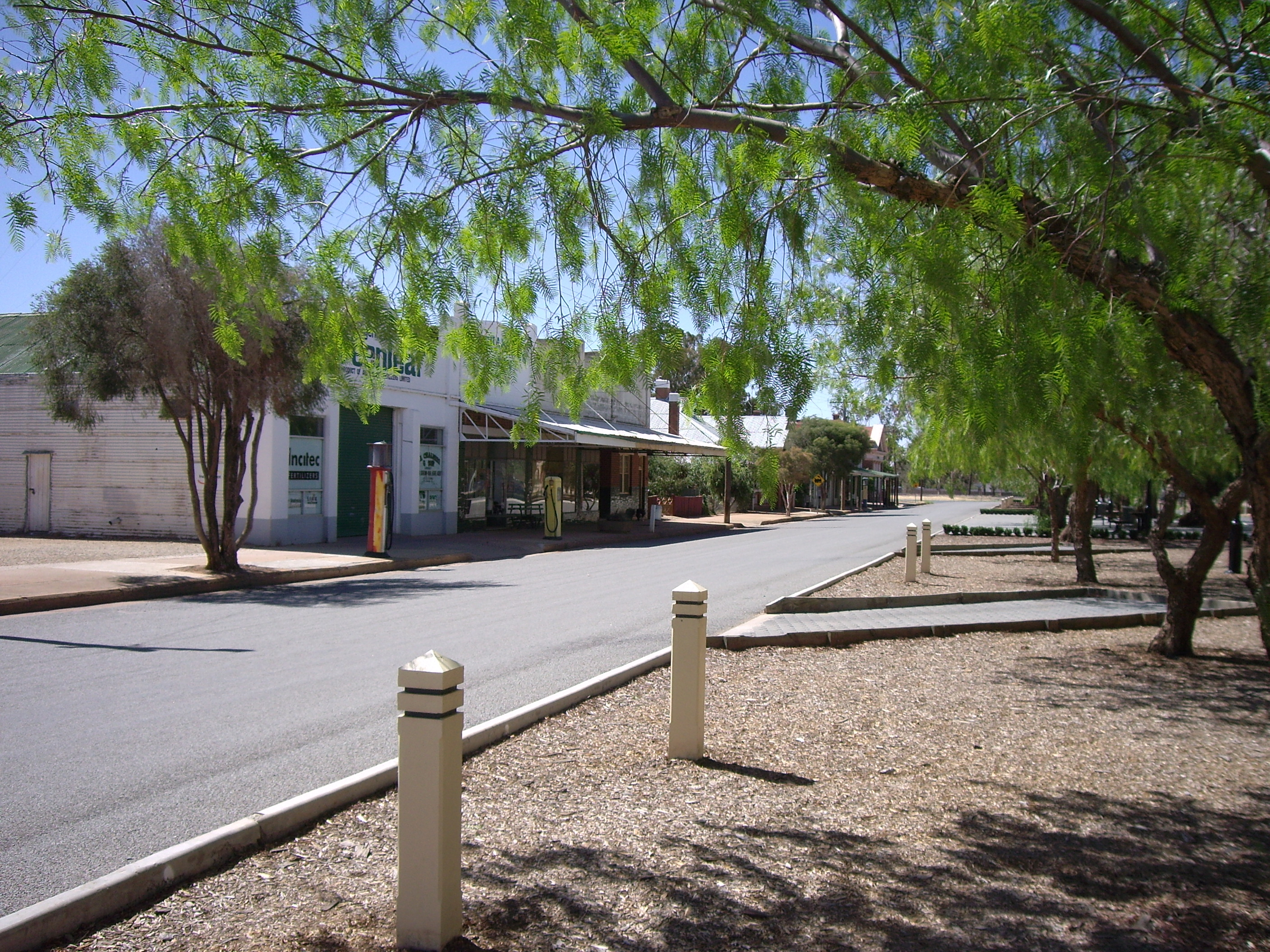
The other side of the main street – note the bowsers

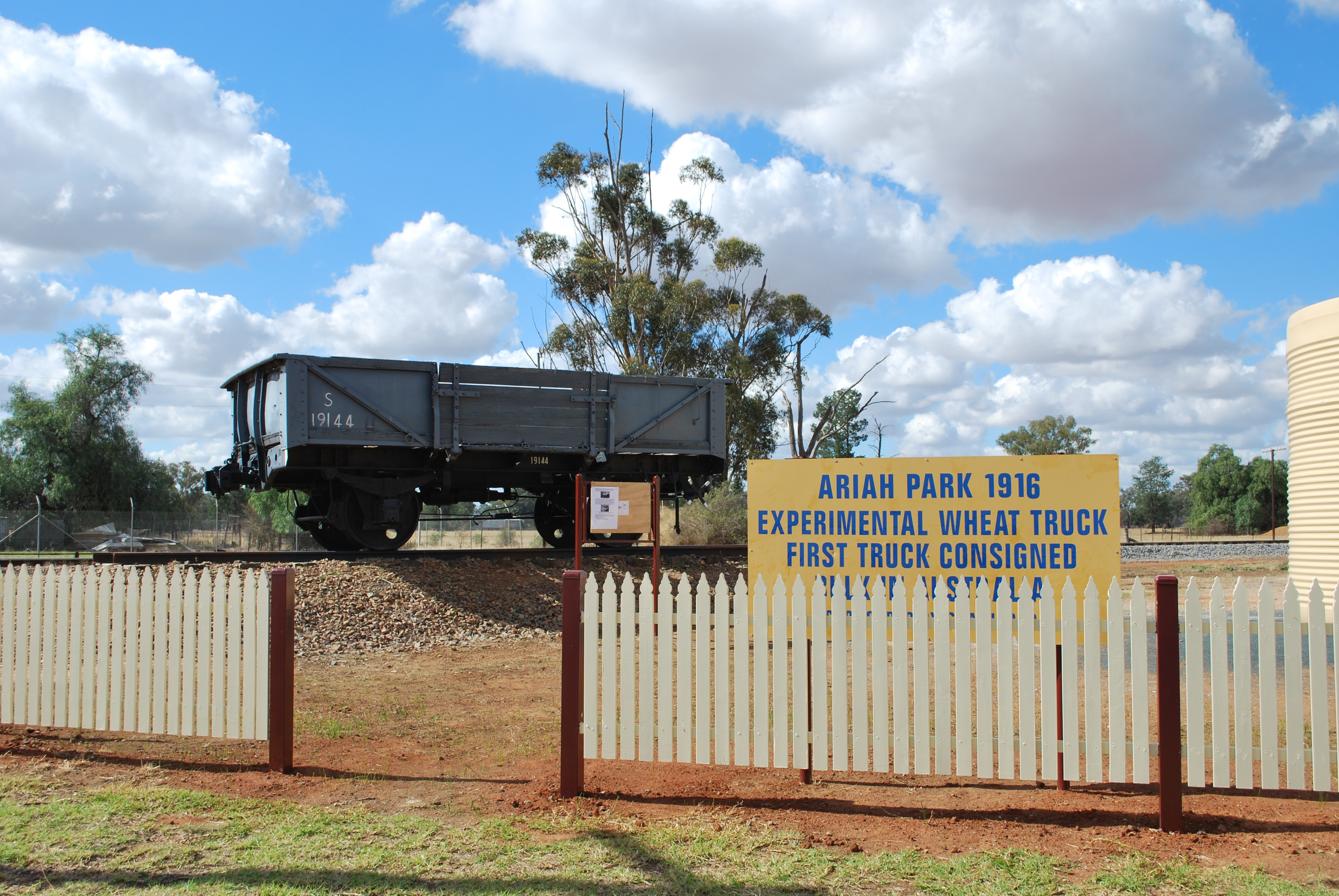
First bulk wheat handling truck from 1916

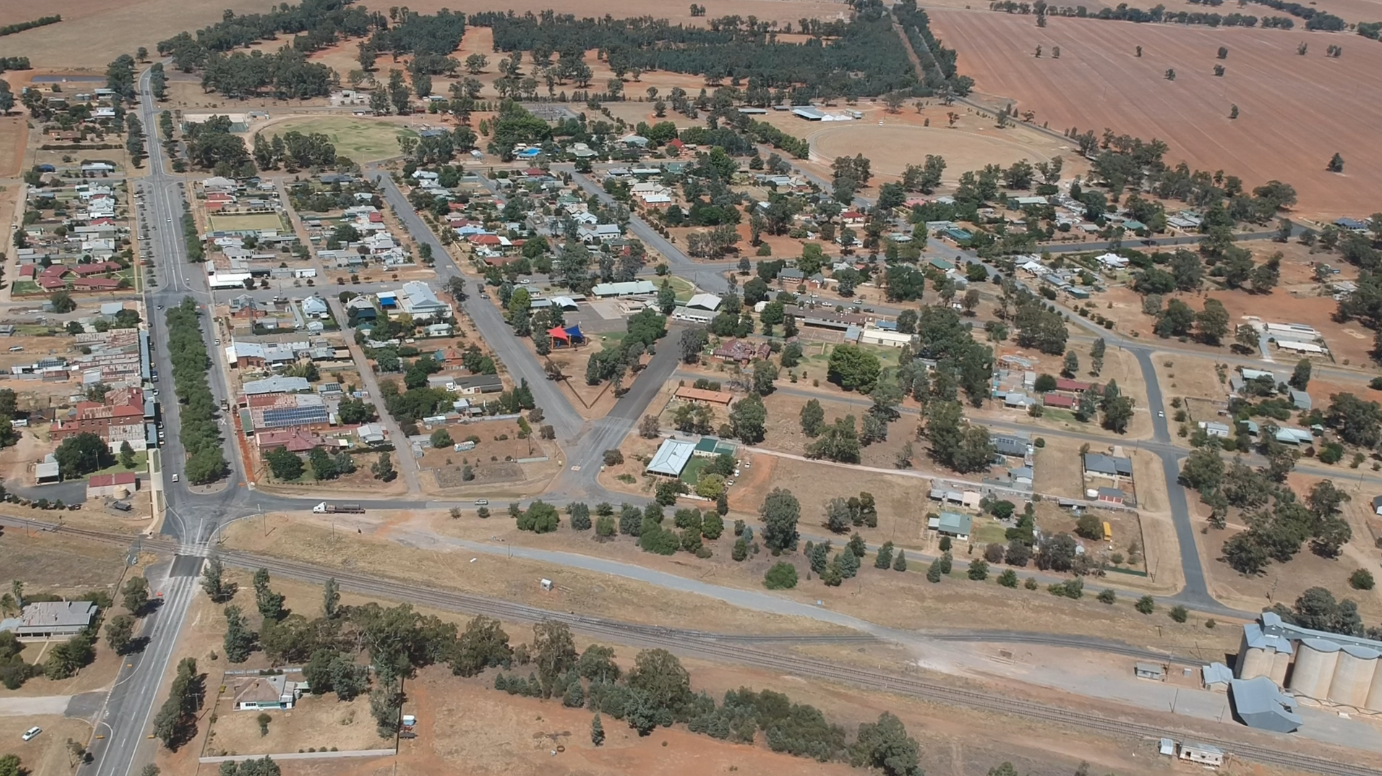
Ariah Park looking South

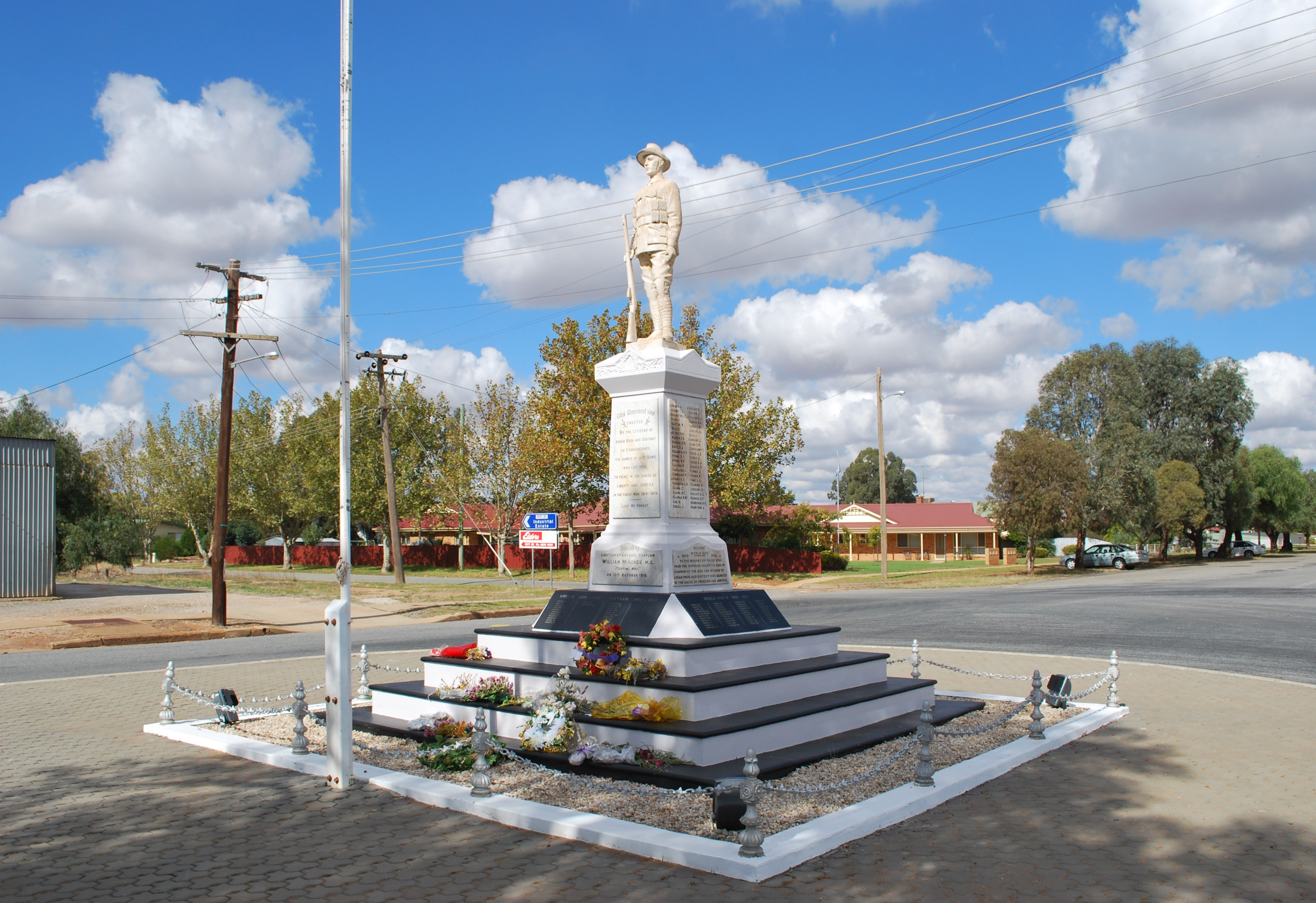
War memorial

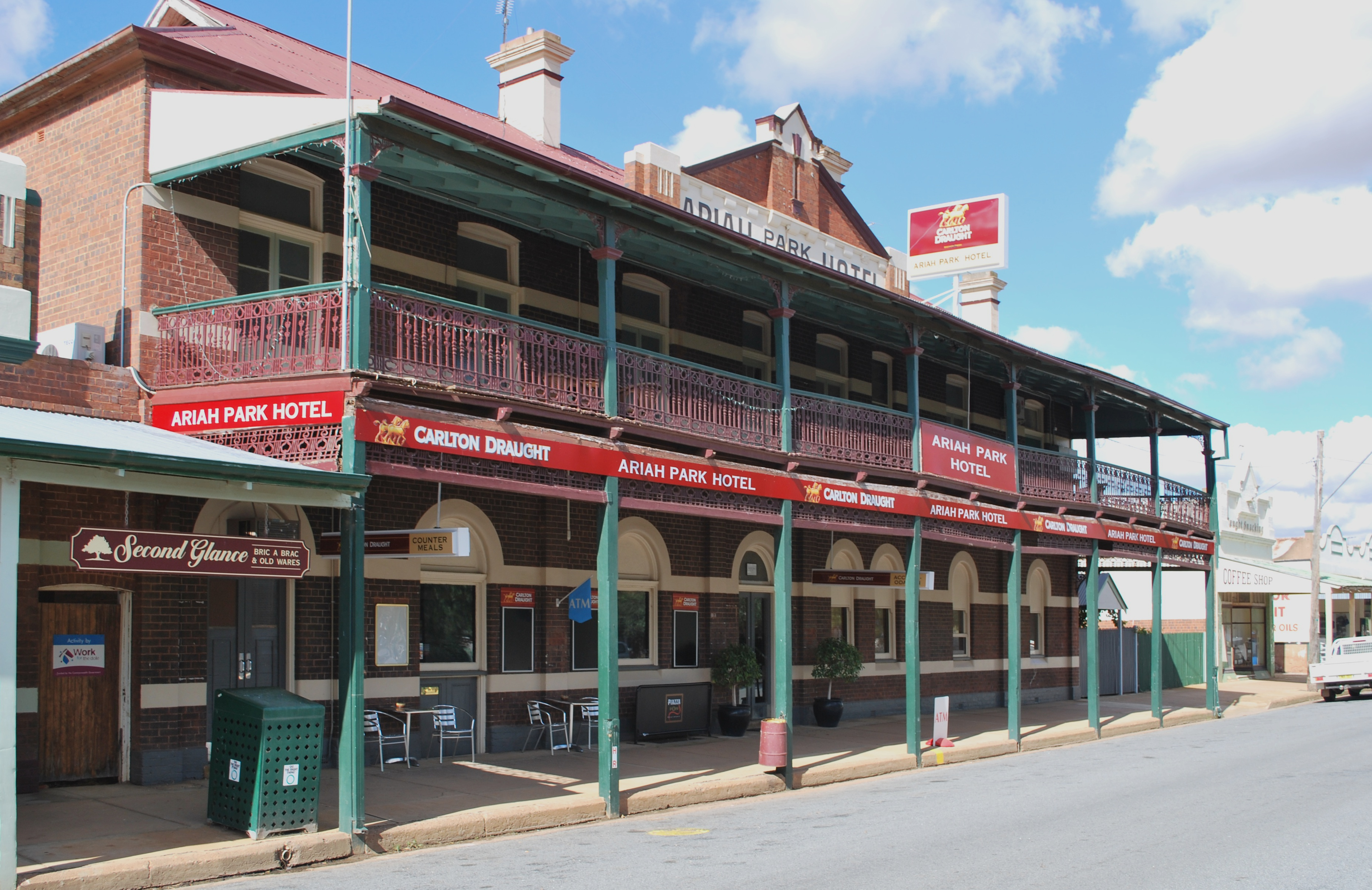
Ariah Park Hotel, built in 1916

== Notable residents ==
- Merv Brooks, Australian rules footballer
- Jack Lucas, Australian rules footballer
- William Maitland Woods, Anglican minister at Ariah Park from 1913 to 1915 and Australian Army chaplain in World War I

== See also ==
- Temora–Roto railway line
