= Coolamon Shire =

- Local government area
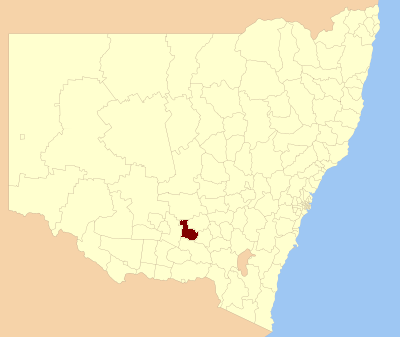
- Location in New South Wales

- Interactive map of Coolamon Shire
- Coordinates: 34°50′S 147°12′E
- Country: Australia
- State: New South Wales
- Region: Riverina
- Established: 6 March 1906
- Council seat: Coolamon

Government
  - Mayor: David McCann (Independent)
  - State electorate: Cootamundra
  - Federal division: Riverina

Area
  - Total: 2,433 km^{2} (939 sq mi)

Population
  - Totals: 4,315 (2016 census); 4,368 (2018 est.)
  - Density: 1.7735/km^{2} (4.5934/sq mi)
- County: Bourke
- Website: Coolamon Shire
LGAs around Coolamon Shire
Bland	Bland	Temora
Narrandera	Coolamon Shire	Junee
Narrandera	Wagga Wagga	Wagga Wagga

Coolamon Shire is a local government area in the Riverina region of south-western New South Wales, Australia. The Shire comprises 2,433 square kilometres (939 sq mi) and is located adjacent to the Newell Highway and the Burley Griffin Way. The Shire includes the towns of Coolamon, Ganmain, and Ardlethan, and the villages of Matong, Marrar, and Beckom.

The mayor of the Coolamon Shire Council is David McCann, an independent politician.

== History ==
Coolamon Shire was first incorporated on 6 March 1906 by a Proclamation under the Local Government (Shires) Act 1905. The boundaries of the Shire were defined as:

Commencing at the most westerly south-west corner of the parish of Elliott, county of Bourke; and bounded thence by the boundaries dividing the parishes of Berrembed, Lupton, Bourke, Fennel, and Boblegigbie from the parishes of Elliott, Ashbridge, Cowabbie, and Walleroobie generally northerly and westerly to the east boundary of the county of Cooper; by part of that boundary northerly to the south-west corner of Bygoo holding; by the southern boundary of that holding easterly, the western and northern boundaries of conditional lease 5,464, parish of Ramsay, county of Bourke, generally north-easterly; by the eastern boundary of the holding northerly, and the northern boundary of Ariah holding easterly to the eastern boundary of the parish of Ariah; by that boundary and the eastern boundary of the parish of Bungambil southerly, part of the northern and the eastern boundaries of the parish of Yarranjerry easterly and southerly; by the northern boundaries of the parishes of Methul and Robertson to the west boundary of the parish of Mimosa; thence by the western and southern boundaries of that parish south-easterly and easterly to the eastern boundary of the county; by that boundary southerly to the south boundary of the parish of Marror; by the south boundary of that parish and the parishes of Coolamon, Derry and Elliott generally westerly, to the point of commencement.

On 15 May 1906 a Temporary Council of five members was appointed by Proclamation. The temporary councillors were: Henry Doubleday, David Hannah, William Henry Rowston, William Steele and George Webb.

The first meeting of the temporary Shire Council was held on 12 June 1906 in the Coolamon Court House. At this meeting Councillor William Rowston was elected as the chairman and the council resolved to nominate Mr J.E.A Florance as shire secretary, subject to ministerial approval. The council was initially divided into three "Ridings" each returning two councillors. The first elections to the council took place on Saturday 24 November 1906. With only the "A Riding" being contested.

The councillors elected in the inaugural election were: Riding A – William Rowston and Thomas Joseph Kelly; Riding B – Henry Doubleday and Thomas E. Lucas; Riding C – John Poiner and Randal King Pike.

The first meeting of the permanent Shire Council was held on 10 December 1906, at which Henry Doubleday was elected as the first President.

On 1 May 1912 the Coolamon Urban Area was Proclaimed, increasing the council's powers to that of a municipality in respect of that Urban Area. Ganmain and Ardlethan were likewise proclaimed as Urban Areas on 14 Oct 1914.

== Council ==
=== Current composition and election method ===
Coolamon Shire Council is composed of nine councillors elected proportionally as a single ward. All councillors are elected for a fixed four-year term of office. The mayor is elected by the councillors at the first meeting of the council. In the most recent election held on 4 December 2021, and the makeup of the council is as follows:

Party	Councillors
Independents and Unaligned	8
Shooters, Fishers and Farmers Party	1
Total	9

The current Council, elected in 2021, is:

Councillor	Party	Notes
Jeremy Crocker	Shooters, Fishers and Farmers	
David McCann	Independent	Mayor
Bronwyn Hatty	Independent	
Kathy Maslin	Unaligned	
Colin McKinnon	Unaligned	
Bruce Hutcheon	Unaligned	
Alan White	Independent	Deputy Mayor
Wayne Lewis	Independent	
Garth Perkin	Independent	

== Election results ==
=== 2024 ===
2024 New South Wales local elections: Coolamon
Party	Candidate	Votes	%	±%
Independent	Bruce Hutcheon (elected)	240	8.70	+1.52
Independent National	Wayne Lewis (elected)	125	4.53	+0.26
Independent	Bronwyn Hatty (elected)	524	18.99	−5.78
Independent	Jeremy Crocker (elected)	285	10.33	−5.7
Independent	Colin McKinnon (elected)	203	7.36	−3.74
Independent	David McCann (elected)	457	16.56	+6.23
Independent	Colin Thew	114	4.13	+4.13
Independent	Kathy Maslin (elected)	220	7.97	−2.32
Independent	Alan White (elected)	188	6.81	+0.26
Independent	Matthew Higginson (elected)	313	11.34	+11.34
Independent	Garth Perkin	91	3.30	−0.08
Total formal votes		2,760	95.57	−0.80
Informal votes		128	4.43	+0.80
Turnout		2,888	85.44	+2.91

=== 2021 ===
2021 New South Wales local elections: Coolamon
Party	Candidate	Votes	%	±%
Independent	Bronwyn Hatty (elected)	638	24.77	
Shooters, Fishers, Farmers	Jeremy Crocker (elected)	413	16.03	
Independent	Colin McKinnon (elected)	286	11.10	
Independent	David McCann (elected)	266	10.33	
Independent	Kathy Maslin (elected)	265	10.29	
Independent	Alan White (elected)	212	8.23	
Independent	Bruce Hutcheon (elected)	185	7.18	
Independent	Trevor Jose	118	4.58	
Independent National	Wayne Lewis (elected)	110	4.27	
Independent	Garth Perkin (elected)	82	3.22	
Total formal votes		2,576	96.4	
Informal votes		97	3.63	
Turnout		2,673	82.53	
