= Bourke County, New South Wales =

Bourke
- Cadastral division
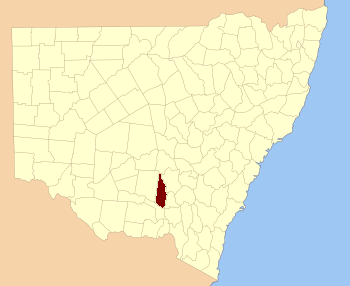
- Location in New South Wales
- Country: Australia
- State: New South Wales
Lands administrative divisions around Bourke
Dowling	Gipps	Bland
Cooper	Bourke	Clarendon
Mitchell	Mitchell	Wynyard

Bourke County is one of the 141 cadastral divisions of New South Wales. It contains the entirety of the Coolamon Shire, including the towns of Coolamon, Ganmain and Ardlethan; as well as parts of Bland, Narrandera and Temora Shires and part of the City of Wagga Wagga. The Murrumbidgee River is the southern boundary.

Bourke County is within the Eastern Land Division, and includes parts of the Wyalong, Temora Central and Wagga Wagga Land Districts.

Bourke County was named in honour of Sir Richard Bourke, Governor (1777–1855).

== Parishes within this county ==
Bourke County contains 55 parishes. A full list of parishes found within this county; their current LGA and mapping coordinates to the approximate centre of each location is as follows:

Parish	LGA	Coordinates
Ardlethan	Bland Shire Council	34°12′54″S 146°58′04″E
Ariah	Bland Shire Council	34°17′54″S 147°00′04″E
Ashbridge	Coolamon Shire Council	34°39′54″S 146°56′04″E
Beaconsfield	Temora Shire Council	34°26′54″S 147°17′04″E
Berrembed	Narrandera Shire Council	34°46′54″S 146°47′04″E
Berry Jerry	Coolamon Shire Council	34°41′54″S 147°13′04″E
Boblegigbie	Coolamon Shire Council	34°29′54″S 146°51′04″E
Bourke	Narrandera Shire Council	34°39′54″S 146°49′04″E
Brangalgan	Coolamon Shire Council	34°33′54″S 147°01′04″E
Buddigower	Bland Shire Council	34°02′54″S 146°59′04″E
Bungambil	Coolamon Shire Council	34°20′54″S 147°00′04″E
Clermiston	Bland Shire Council	33°59′54″S 147°05′04″E
Coolamon	Coolamon Shire Council	34°50′54″S 147°11′04″E
Cottee	City of Wagga Wagga	34°54′54″S 147°08′04″E
Cowabbie	Coolamon Shire Council	34°34′54″S 146°56′04″E
Currawananna	City of Wagga Wagga	34°59′54″S 147°07′04″E
Davidson	Bland Shire Council	34°13′54″S 147°07′04″E
Derry	Coolamon Shire Council	34°47′54″S 147°01′04″E
Devlin	Coolamon Shire Council	34°43′54″S 147°01′04″E
Drumston	Bland Shire Council	33°57′54″S 147°00′04″E
Dulah	Coolamon Shire Council	34°39′54″S 147°02′04″E
Elliott	Narrandera Shire Council	34°45′54″S 146°55′04″E
Ellon	Bland Shire Council	34°08′54″S 146°58′04″E
Fennel	Narrandera Shire Council	34°34′54″S 146°50′04″E
Ganmain	City of Wagga Wagga	34°55′54″S 147°01′04″E
Hooke	City of Wagga Wagga	34°51′54″S 147°00′04″E
Ingalba	Temora Shire Council	34°31′54″S 147°23′04″E
Jillett	Bland Shire Council	34°08′54″S 146°53′04″E
Kildary	Bland Shire Council	34°08′54″S 147°07′04″E
Kindra	Coolamon Shire Council	34°46′54″S 147°12′04″E
Kinilibah	Coolamon Shire Council	34°48′54″S 147°22′04″E
Kockibitoo	City of Wagga Wagga	34°51′54″S 146°58′04″E
Lachlan	Coolamon Shire Council	34°41′54″S 147°23′04″E
Langi-Kal-Kal	Bland Shire Council	34°12′54″S 147°14′04″E
Lupton	Narrandera Shire Council	34°41′54″S 146°48′04″E
Mandamah	Temora Shire Council	34°17′54″S 147°11′04″E
Marrar	Coolamon Shire Council	34°52′54″S 147°18′04″E
Matong	City of Wagga Wagga	34°51′54″S 146°54′04″E
Methul	Coolamon Shire Council	34°34′54″S 147°08′04″E
Mimosa	Temora Shire Council	34°36′54″S 147°25′04″E
Murrulebale	Coolamon Shire Council	34°45′54″S 147°23′04″E
Northcote	Temora Shire Council	34°26′54″S 147°23′04″E
Quandary	Temora Shire Council	34°20′54″S 147°20′04″E
Ramsay	Bland Shire Council	34°16′54″S 146°53′04″E
Robertson	Coolamon Shire Council	34°35′54″S 147°17′04″E
Tara	Temora Shire Council	34°28′54″S 147°10′04″E
Tooyal	City of Wagga Wagga	34°59′54″S 147°15′04″E
Trickett	Temora Shire Council	34°30′54″S 147°17′04″E
Walleroobie	Coolamon Shire Council	34°26′54″S 146°53′04″E
Warren	City of Wagga Wagga	34°54′54″S 147°14′04″E
Warri	Coolamon Shire Council	34°20′54″S 146°54′04″E
Willandra	Bland Shire Council	34°01′54″S 146°55′04″E
Windeyer	Temora Shire Council	34°23′54″S 147°10′04″E
Yarranjerry	Coolamon Shire Council	34°26′54″S 146°59′04″E
Yithan	Bland Shire Council	34°11′54″S 146°54′04″E
