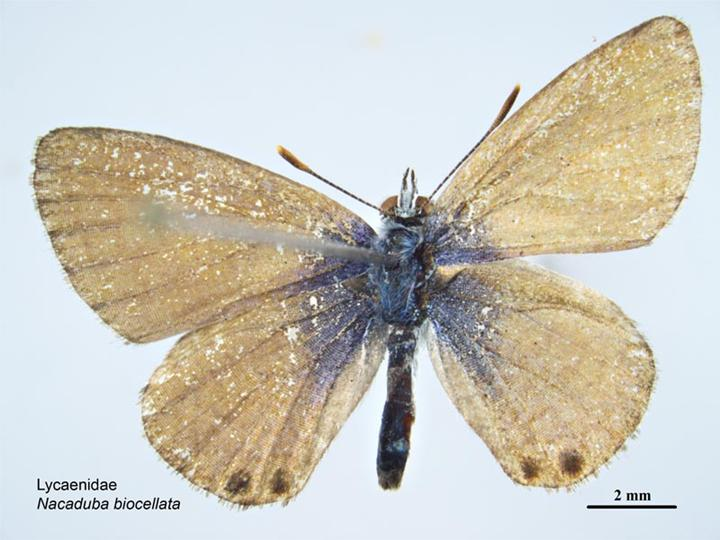
- Female, dorsal view
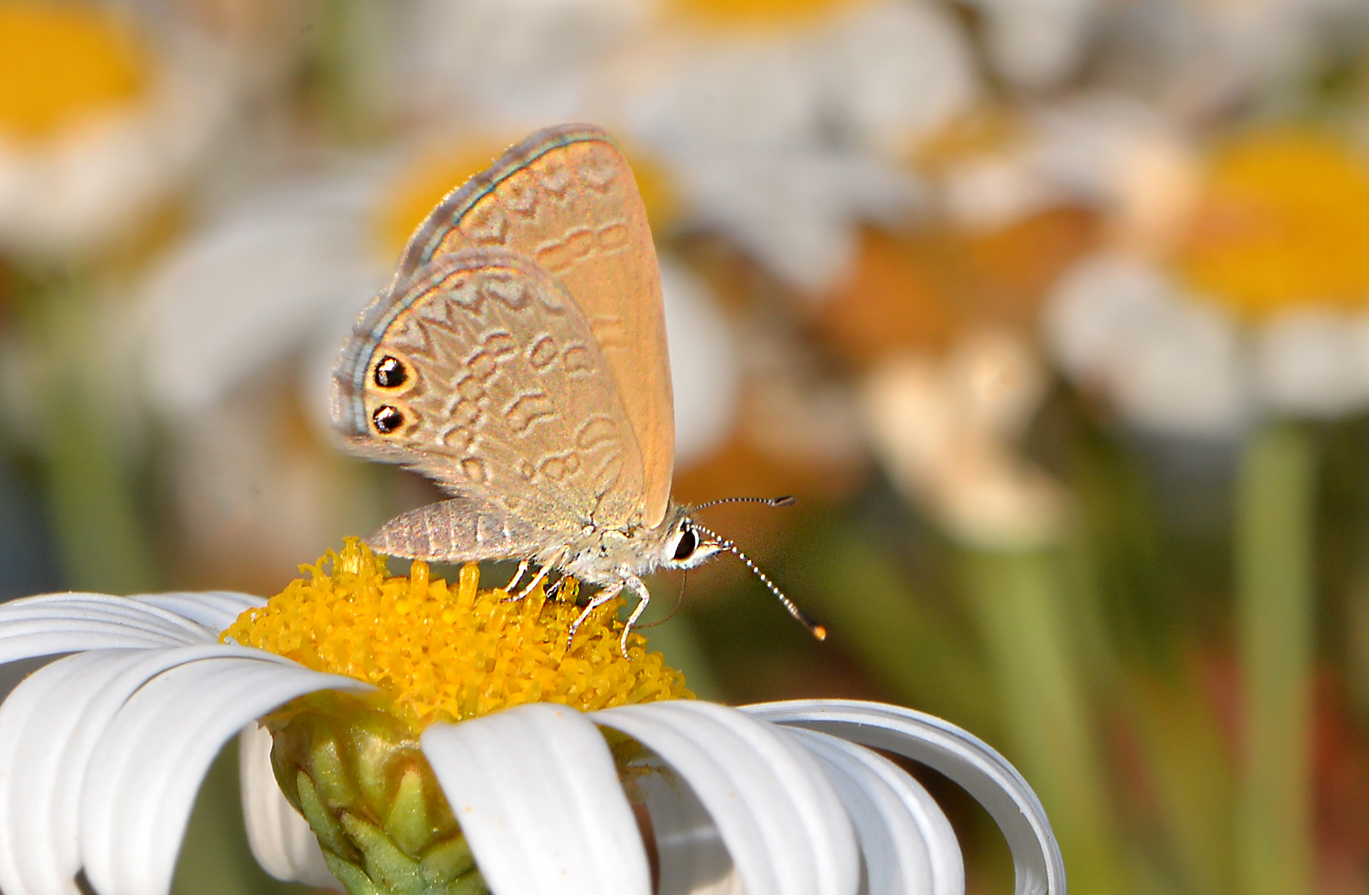

Scientific classification
- Domain: Eukaryota
- Kingdom: Animalia
- Phylum: Arthropoda
- Class: Insecta
- Order: Lepidoptera
- Family: Lycaenidae
- Genus: Nacaduba
- Species: N. biocellata

Binomial name
- Nacaduba biocellata (C. & R. Felder, [1865])

Synonyms
- Lycaena biocellata C. & R. Felder, [1865]; Cupido adamapuncta Tepper, 1882

= Nacaduba biocellata =

Double-spotted line blue

Species of butterfly

Nacaduba biocellata, the double-spotted line blue, is a butterfly of the family Lycaenidae. It is found in Australia (including New South Wales, the Northern Territory, South Australia, Victoria and Western Australia), Singapore, the New Hebrides, Sumba and Bali.

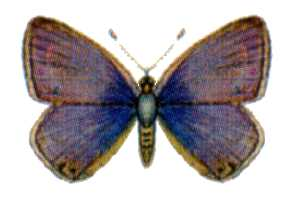
Male

The wingspan is about 20 mm. Adult females have a brown upperside, while the males are blue with narrow black margins. The underside of both sexes is pale brown with light and dark wavy lines.

The larvae feed on the shoots, flowers and buds of various Acacia species, including A. aneura, A. betchei, A. brachybotrya, A. deanei, A. erinaceae, A. irrorata, A. karroo, A. ligulata, A. osswaldii, A. penninervis, A. rigens, A. salicina, A. sclerophylla, A. sowdenii and A. victoriae. They can have a wide range of colours depending on their host plant, including pink, orange, yellow or green. They are attended by ants, mostly Iridomyrmex species, including I. purpureus and I. viridiaeneus.

Pupation takes place in a pale brown pupa.

== Subspecies ==
- Nacaduba biocellata biocellata (Australia)
- Nacaduba biocellata armillata (Butler, [1876]) (New Hebrides, Sumba)
- Nacaduba biocellata baliensis Tite, 1963 (Bali)
