= Nilyah =

Nilyah or nealia is a common name for several plants and may refer to:

- Acacia pendula, native to Australia
- Acacia rigens, endemic to Australia
