= Bluebush =

Bluebush can refer to:

== Plants ==
- Acacia brachybotrya (grey wattle) of Australia
- Acacia caesiella (tableland wattle) of Australia
- Chenopodium (goosefoot) species in Australia
- Diospyros lycioides (bushveld bluebush) of Africa
- Maireana, the bluebushes proper

== Other ==
- Bluebush Creek, Western Australia
- Bluebush Parish, Windeyer County, New South Wales
