= North Yalgogrin =

- Town
- Interactive map of North Yalgogrin
- Coordinates: 33°50′41.3″S 146°49′42.5″E
- Country: Australia
- State: New South Wales
- LGA: Bland Shire
- Location: 18.6 km (11.6 mi) N of Tallimba; 36 km (22 mi) WNW of West Wyalong

Government
  - State electorate: Cootamundra
  - Federal division: Parkes

Population
  - Total: 77 (SAL 2021)
- Postcode: 2671

North Yalgogrin is a locality in the Bland Shire local government area of New South Wales. There once was a village there, named Yalgogrin, but better known as Yalgogrin North.

The area now known as North Yalgogrin, lies on the traditional lands of Wiradjuri people. The name is said to be derived from a Wiradjuri language word Yalgaa, meaning dried up and hard, referring to a dead box gum tree.

There are a number of former mines in the vicinity. The mining in the area was mainly for gold. Alluvial gold was discovered around August 1893, about eight miles west of what became the village. Quartz reefs were found soon afterwards, with more discovered in 1894, leading to the establishment of the village. There was a stamper battery there, which had ceased operation by mid-1905, but resumed operation later the same year. It operated sporadically, as late as the 1930s. The last mining occurred in 1954, but the area remains of interest for gold exploration.

The village of Yalgogrin was proclaimed in 1895. It lay on 130 acres of land excised from a block of pastoral leasehold land, known as 'Yalgogoring North'. The village of also became known as Yalgogrin North, possibly after the original landholding, possibly due to another locality, Yalgogrin South—about 40 km south—but most likely because that was the name of its post office and its postal address, from 1894. It was also, but far less frequently, called by the modern-day name of the locality, North Yalgogrin. It was known colloquially, by locals, as 'The Gog'.

There were a number of mines just west of what became the village site, but there were many more mines in the district. Yangogrin became the centre for the surrounding mining district, in the absence of other towns and villages in the area. Records of production are incomplete, but the goldfield produced more than 200 kg of gold, between 1898 and 1904.

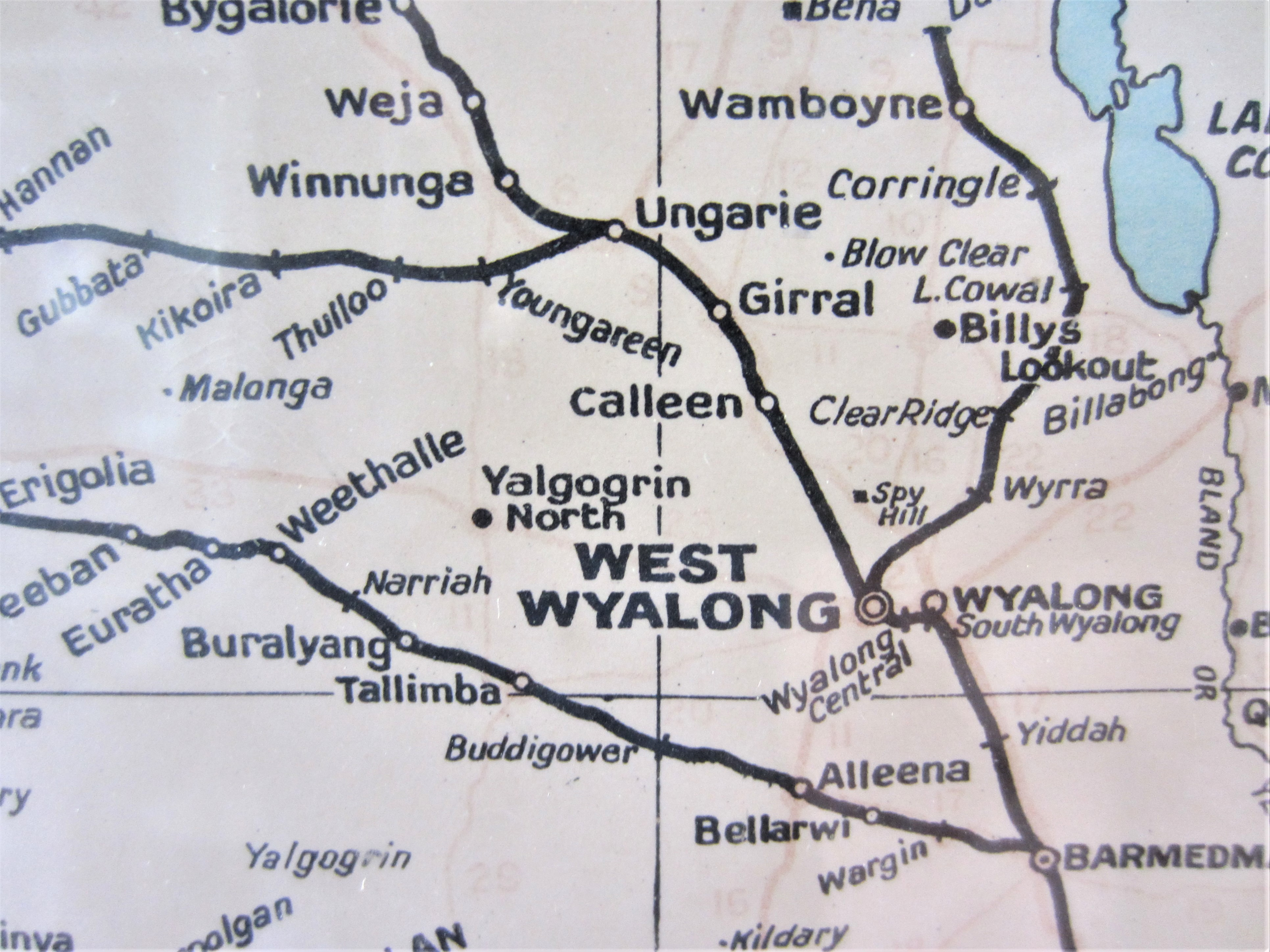
Map showing the railway lines and the newer settlements on those lines, which led to the decline of Yalgogrin North.

By 1912, gold mining was still happening but not the main economic activity of the area. Between 1893 and 1911, much of the surrounding land was cleared of its timber for mining and building purposes. Gangs of ethnic-Chinese land clearers ringbarked and cleared land for wheat growing. The larger grazing runs had been broken up into smaller farms. The village, although smaller in population, was more settled, as a service town for the surrounding agricultural district.

A railway league was formed to campaign for Yalgogrin to be on the route a proposed railway between Barmedman and Rankin Springs. In 1916, a final decision was taken that Yalgogrin would not be on the line.

Yalgogrin was not on any of the railway lines that were built in the district, from 1913 to 1929. It declined relative to newly-established places that had railway stations and grain sidings, like Weethalle, Kikoira, Ungarie, and especially Tallimba. Surrounded on all sides by such places, Yalgogrin essentially was pulled apart by their economic gravity. The Royal Hotel, also known as Barnett's Hotel—both licence and building—was transferred, in 1923, to Tallimba Siding on the newly-opened Rankins Springs railway line, even before the new town of Tallimba had been laid out. The police station closed in 1927, with the police presence being relocated to Tallimba.

Yalgogrin still had sporting teams and tennis matches, into the 1930s, but increasingly the surrounding area came to rely upon Tallimba for its services. By the early 1940s, it has become what was described as a 'small locality'.

There was a school there, known as Yalgrogin, from 1895 to 1970. There was a post office there, known as Yalgogrin North, from 1894 to 1985. It had an Anglican church, St Mary's the Virgin, completed in 1919; the church building had been relocated from Wyalong. By 1977, the church's structure had deteriorated and was no longer safe. The old church was demolished and the disused school building repurposed as a church. The village had a public hall, still standing in 1989. There is a cemetery to the north of the old village site.

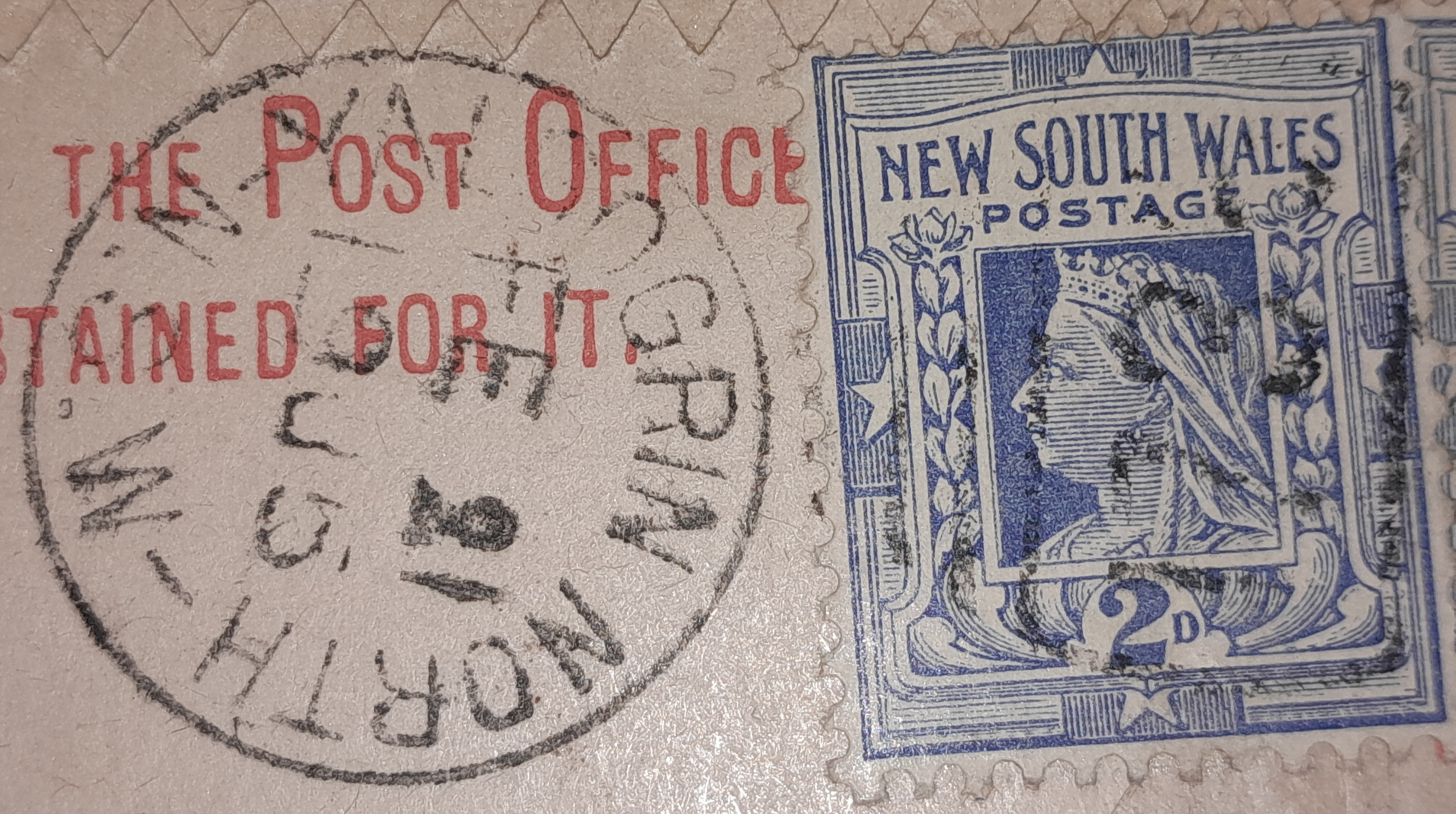
Postmarks of Yalgogrin North Post Office, date stamp and numerical code '1736' (1905)

In 1985 and 1991, blocks of land in the old village were put up for sale to recover rates left overdue by their—by then mainly deceased—owners.

In late 1980, the Village of Yalgogrin—still better known as Yalgogrin North—officially ceased to exist, becoming a locality, Yalgogrin, under the Geographical Names Act (1966). In 1995, Yalgogrin became designated as a historical locality, under the same Act, and the name of the locality officially became North Yalgogrin. The name Yalgogrin survives as the name of the local Rural Fire Brigade and of a rest area on the Mid-Western Highway, both near the site of the former village.
