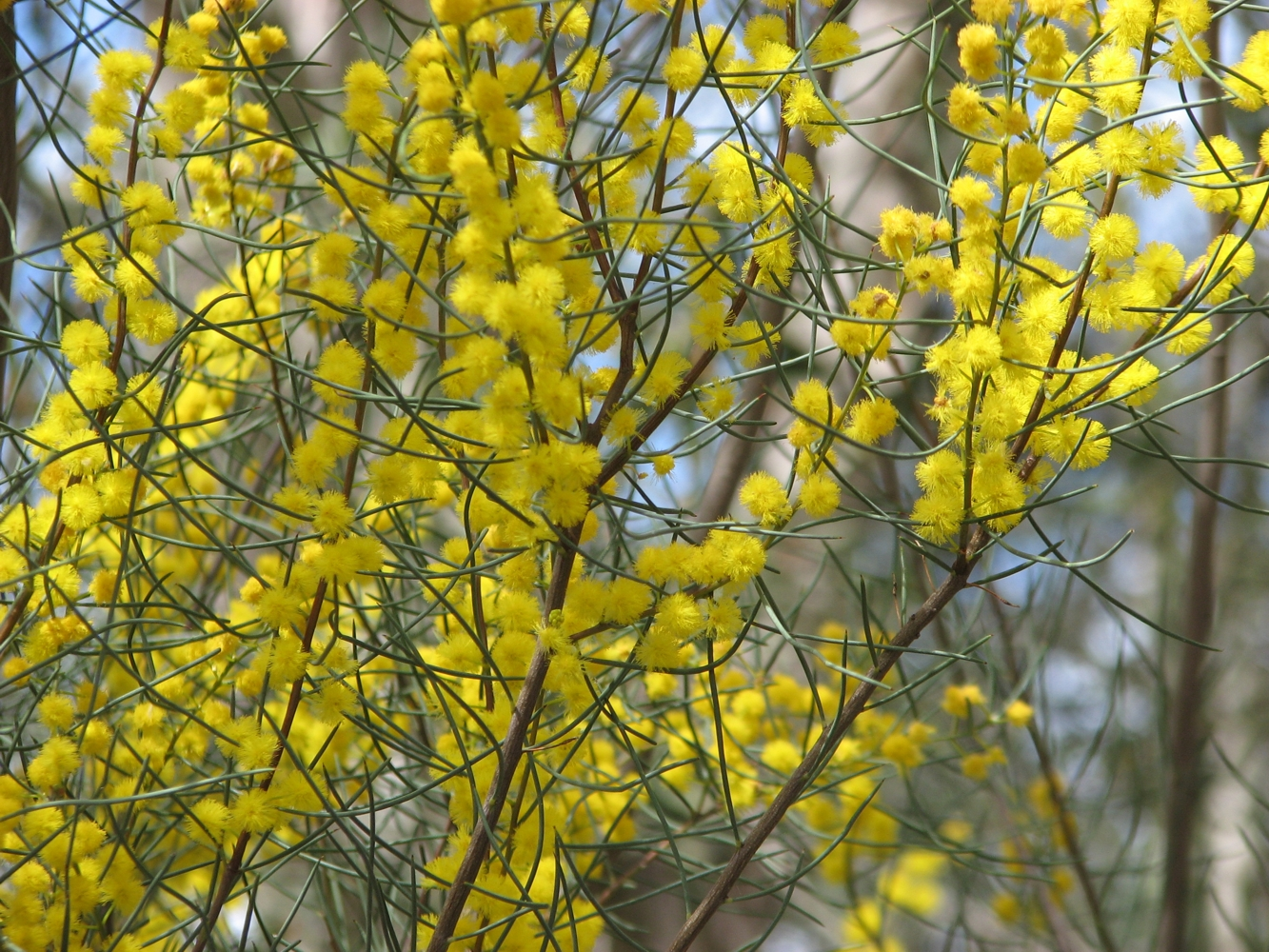
- In Maranoa Gardens

Scientific classification
- Kingdom: Plantae
- Clade: Tracheophytes
- Clade: Angiosperms
- Clade: Eudicots
- Clade: Rosids
- Order: Fabales
- Family: Fabaceae
- Subfamily: Caesalpinioideae
- Clade: Mimosoid clade
- Genus: Acacia
- Species: A. rigens

Binomial name
- Acacia rigens A.Cunn. ex G.Don
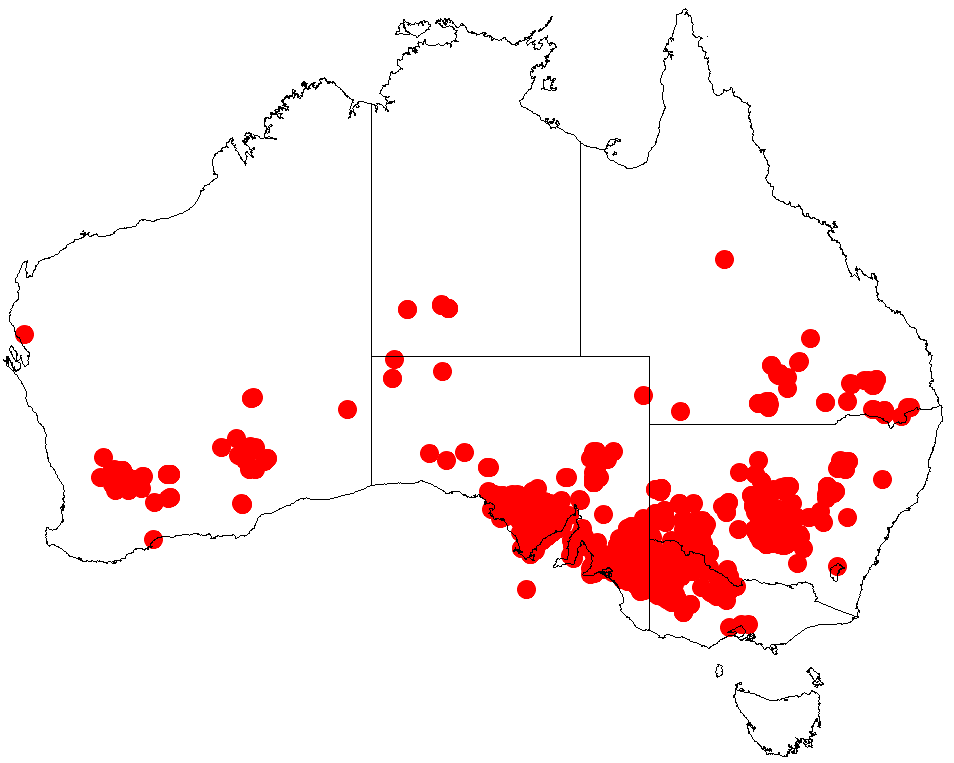
- Occurrence data from AVH

Synonyms
- Acacia chordophylla Benth.; Racosperma rigens (A.Cunn. ex Don) Pedley

= Acacia rigens =

Species of plant

Habit

Acacia rigens, commonly known as nealie, is an erect or spreading shrub or small tree that is endemic to Australia. Other common names include needle wattle, needlebush acacia, nealia and nilyah.

== Description ==
Plants typically grows to a height of 1 to 6 m (3 ft 3 in to 19 ft 8 in) and have rigid, terete phyllodes that are between 3 and 13 cm (1.2 and 5.1 in) in length. The bright yellow flowerheads appear in groups of up to four in the axils of the phyllodes. The simple inflorescences have resinous and spherical flower-heads with a diameter of 4 to 7 mm (0.16 to 0.28 in) and contain 20 to 30 bright yellow coloured, 5-merous flowers that appear between July and December in the species' native range, followed by curled, twisted or coiled seed pods which are 4 to 10 cm (1.6 to 3.9 in) long and 2 to 3 mm (0.079 to 0.118 in) wide.

== Taxonomy ==
The species was first formally described in 1832 by botanist Allan Cunningham. It resembles Acacia havilandiorum but has longer phyllodes and 4-merous flowers. The specific epithet is thought to be a reference to the rigidity of the phyllodes.

== Distribution ==
The species occurs on red earth, sandy or shaly soils in mallee and woodland in southern Western Australia, South Australia, Victoria, New South Wales and Queensland.

== Cultivation ==
The species is fast-growing and is both frost and drought tolerant, rarely requiring watering after establishment. It is adaptable to most soils and is best suited to a position in full sun or light shade.

The larvae of the double-spotted lineblue butterfly feed on this species.

== See also ==
- List of Acacia species
