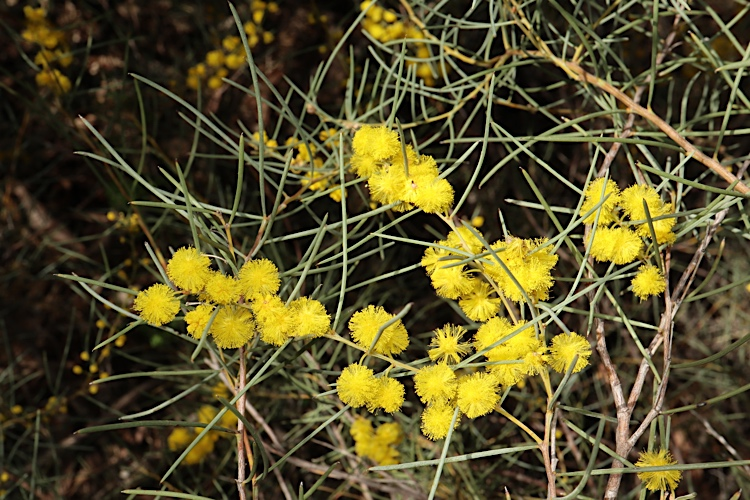

Conservation status
- Least Concern (IUCN 3.1)

Scientific classification
- Kingdom: Plantae
- Clade: Tracheophytes
- Clade: Angiosperms
- Clade: Eudicots
- Clade: Rosids
- Order: Fabales
- Family: Fabaceae
- Subfamily: Caesalpinioideae
- Clade: Mimosoid clade
- Genus: Acacia
- Species: A. havilandiorum

Binomial name
- Acacia havilandiorum Maiden
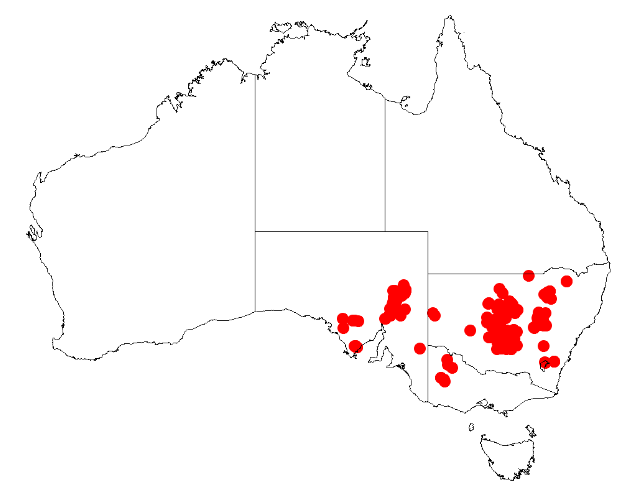
- Occurrence data from AVH

= Acacia havilandiorum =

Species of plant

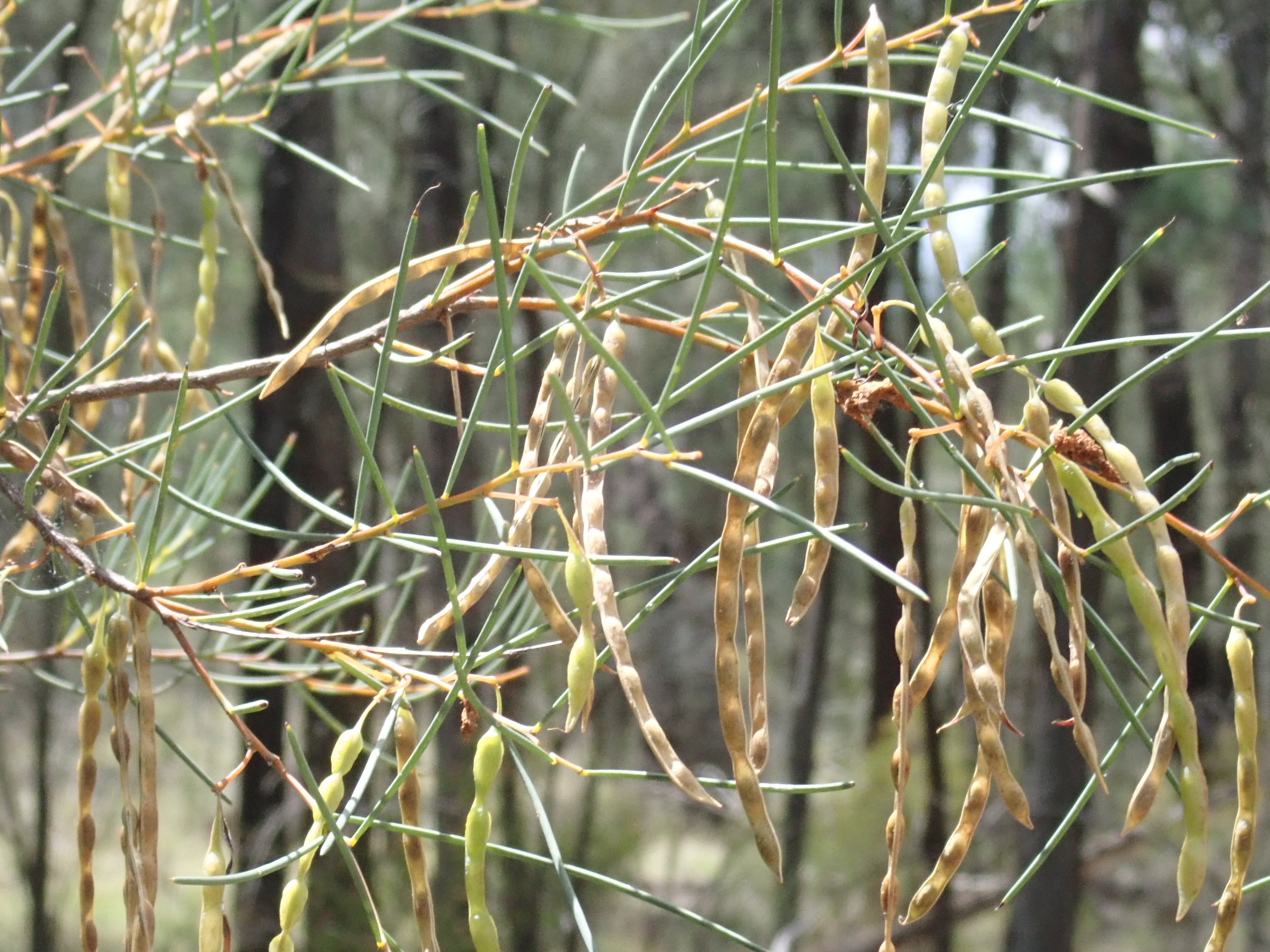
Pods

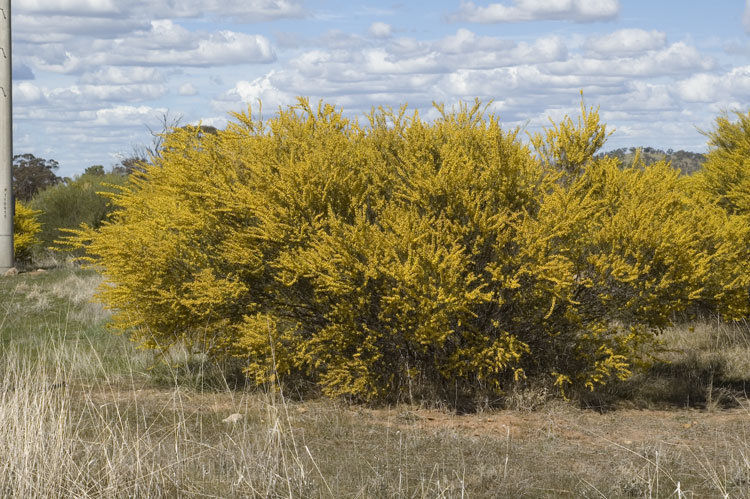
Habit near Yalgogrin

Acacia havilandiorum, also known as Haviland's wattle or needle wattle, is a species of flowering plant in the family Fabaceae and is endemic to the south-east of continental Australia. It is a bushy shrub, occasionally a tree, with inclined to ascending straight or slightly curved phyllodes, spherical heads of pale to bright golden yellow flowers and linear, thinly leathery pods.

== Description ==
Acacia havilandiorum is a bushy shrub that typically grows to a height of 1.5–3 m (4 ft 11 in – 9 ft 10 in), occasionally a tree to 4 m (13 ft) with terete, glabrous branchlets. Its phyllodes are inclined to ascending, straight or slightly curved, terete or subterete, 30–80 mm (1.2–3.1 in) long, 0.8–1.5 mm (0.031–0.059 in) wide, rigid, sometimes sharply pointed, snapping easily and cleanly, with many closely parallel fine veins. The flowers are borne in up to three spherical heads in axils on glabrous peduncles 4–8 mm (0.16–0.31 in) long, each head with 20 to 30 pale to bright golden yellow flowers. Flowering occurs from July to October and the pods are linear, straight or slightly curved, up to 100 mm (3.9 in) long, 2–3 mm (0.079–0.118 in) wide, thinly leathery, glabrous and more or less constricted between the seeds. The seeds are oblong to egg-shaped, 3.0–3.5 mm (0.12–0.14 in) long, glossy dark brown with a hood-like aril near the end.

== Taxonomy ==
Acacia havilandiorum was first formally described in 1920 by Joseph Maiden who gave it the name Acacia havilandi in the Journal and Proceedings of the Royal Society of New South Wales from specimens collected in 1917 in "Wong Suey's Paddock" in Cobar by "Archdeacon Francis Ernest Haviland". The specific epithet honours both Edwin Haviland (1823–1908) and his son Francis Ernest Haviland who collected the type specimens, both of whom "specialised in the fertilisation of Australian plants and have also worked at taxonomy and other branches of botany", so the epithet was changed to the genitive plural (havilandiorum) to accord with ICN Art. 60.8 (Shenzhen Code, 2018).

== Distribution and habitat ==
Haviland's wattle has a discontinuous distribution from as far west as the Eyre Peninsula in South Australia to near Gilgandra in New South Wales. It is mainly found in the Flinders Range area and in the Griffith area of New South Wales. In Victoria it is only known from west of Horsham. It mainly grows in sandy or loamy red soils in mallee and woodland communities on rocky hillsides and ridges.

== See also ==
- List of Acacia species
