= Tallimba =

- Town
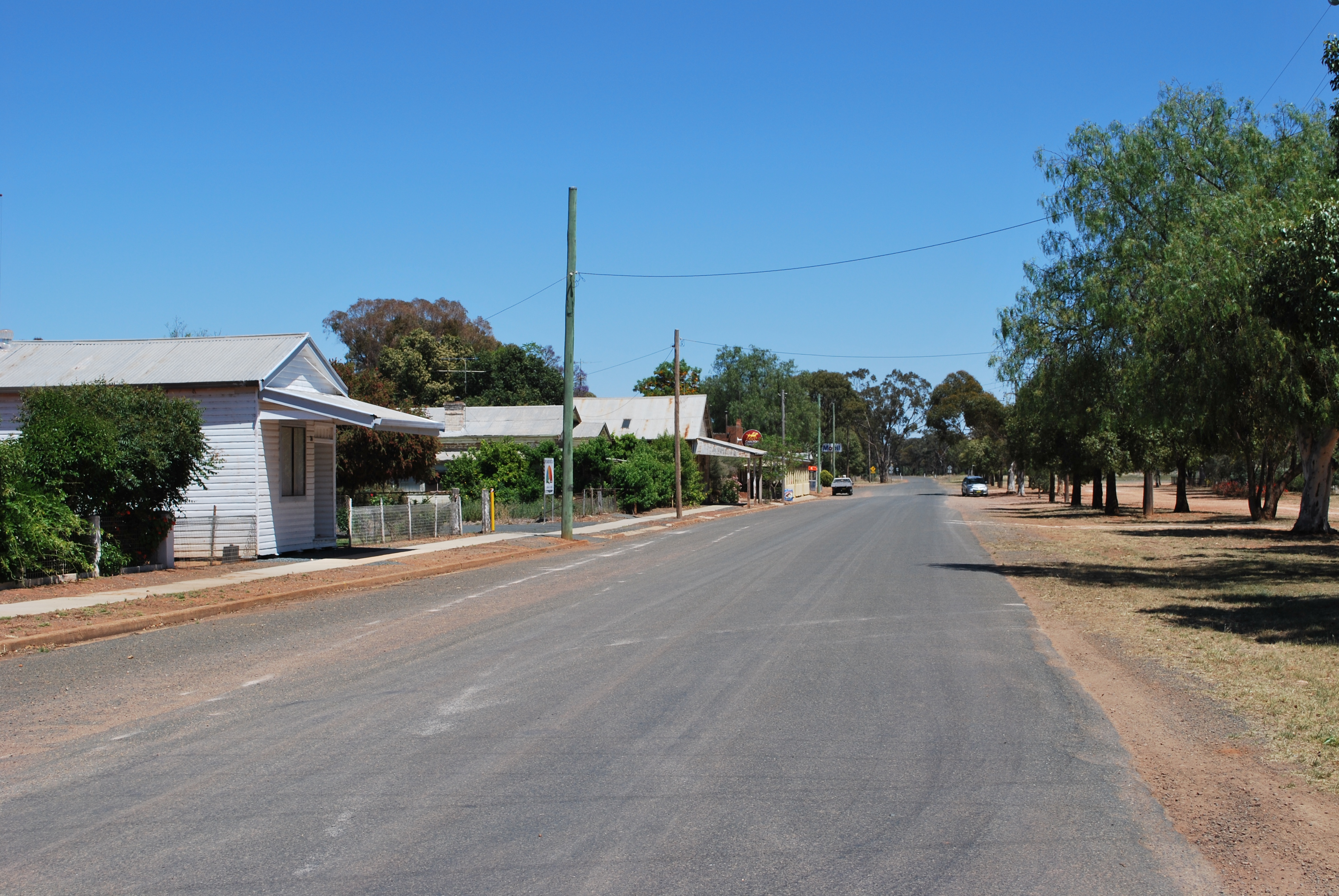
- Main street approaching from West Wyalong

- Coordinates: 33°59′39″S 146°52′50″E
- Country: Australia
- State: New South Wales
- LGA: Bland Shire
- Location: 23 km (14 mi) from Yalgogrin South; 34 km (21 mi) from West Wyalong

Government
  - State electorate: Cootamundra
  - Federal division: Parkes
- Elevation: 216 m (709 ft)

Population
  - Total: 185 (SAL 2021)
- Postcode: 2669

Tallimba is a town in the Central West area of New South Wales, Australia. It is a part of the Bland Shire 34 km from West Wyalong and 1½ hours' drive from Wagga Wagga. As of the 2021 census, Tallimba had a population of 185. 55.3% being male, and another 44.7% female. 2.2% of residents actively identify as Aboriginal or Torres Strait Islander peoples.

== Infrastructure ==
- St Bernadette's Catholic Church, built 1953, still in use each 1st and 3rd Sunday Mass 5pm
- Tallimba Hall
- Tallimba Public School
- Government Dam
- Tallimba War Memorial Park
- Cricket Oval
- Tallimba Police Station

== Sporting teams ==
- Tallimba Hawks – Australian rules football team (disbanded)
- Tallimba rugby league team (disbanded)
- Tallimba Cricket Club
- Tallimba Tennis Club
- Tallimba Fishing Club
- Tallimba grasshopping racing

== History of the primary school ==
Tallimba School was established to educate the children of settlers from the Tallimba District. Originally part of Willandry Station the arrival of the railway line from Barmedman meant wheat was able to be transported away to ports and mills.

There was an influx of settlers from Victoria and South Australia to take up bush blocks varying from 640 to 800 acres (2.6 to 3.2 km^{2}). Despite the hardships endured in establishing a farm and home in virgin bush, the importance of education was not overlooked and on 16 June 1925, a school with 18 students opened. Due to increasing enrolments a second teacher was appointed in 1949, and in 1950/51 the building was moved across the road to a new, less flood-prone site.

The school size peaked in 1968 with sufficient numbers for three teachers. The P&C have always actively supported the school providing for many facilities at the school before they became standard equipment.

== Notable residents ==
- Terry Gathercole – Olympic medallist in swimming and former Australian national team coach was born in Tallimba. (Deceased)
- Fanny Lumsden – Country music singer
- Jimmy – Iconic dog known by all residents. Owned by Paul McDonald. Signature catchphrase, barking at cars as they drive away/pull up.
- Geoff Mackenzie – strong activist who advocates women's rights, environmental conservation. Also held a protest in the park which aimed to show a large support for green energy as Australia moves forward to being carbon neutral. (Deceased)

== Gallery ==
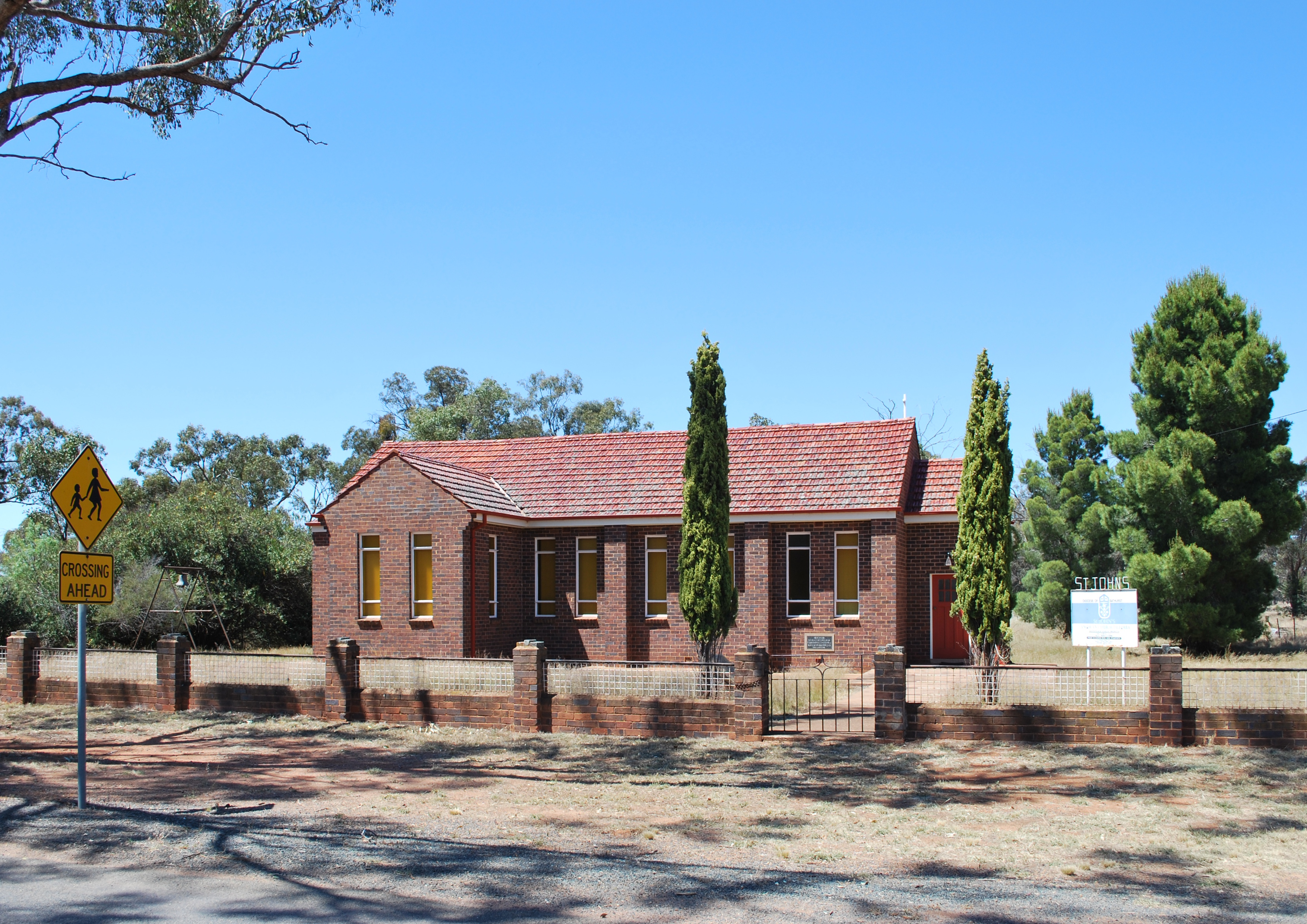
Anglican Church

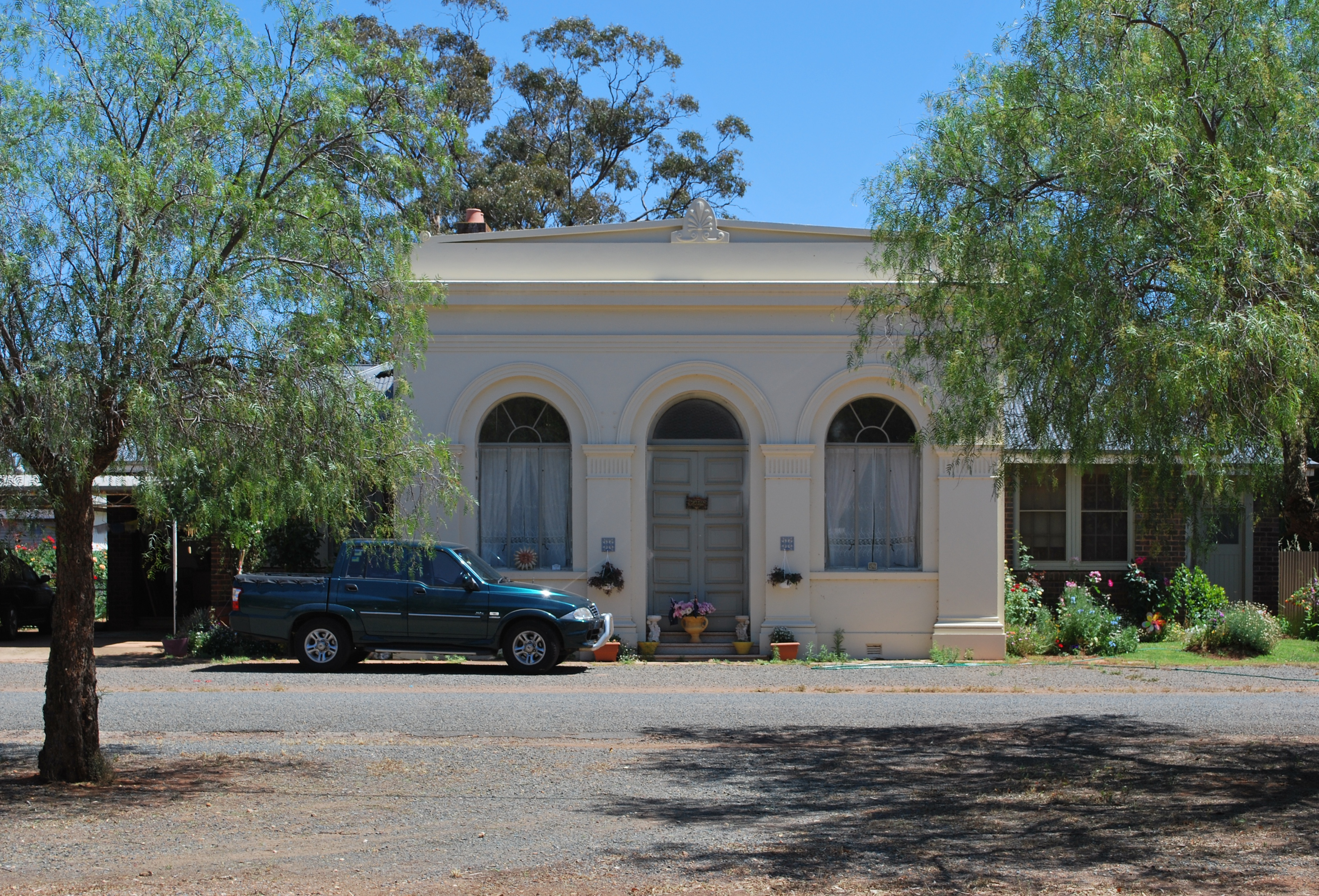
Former Bank

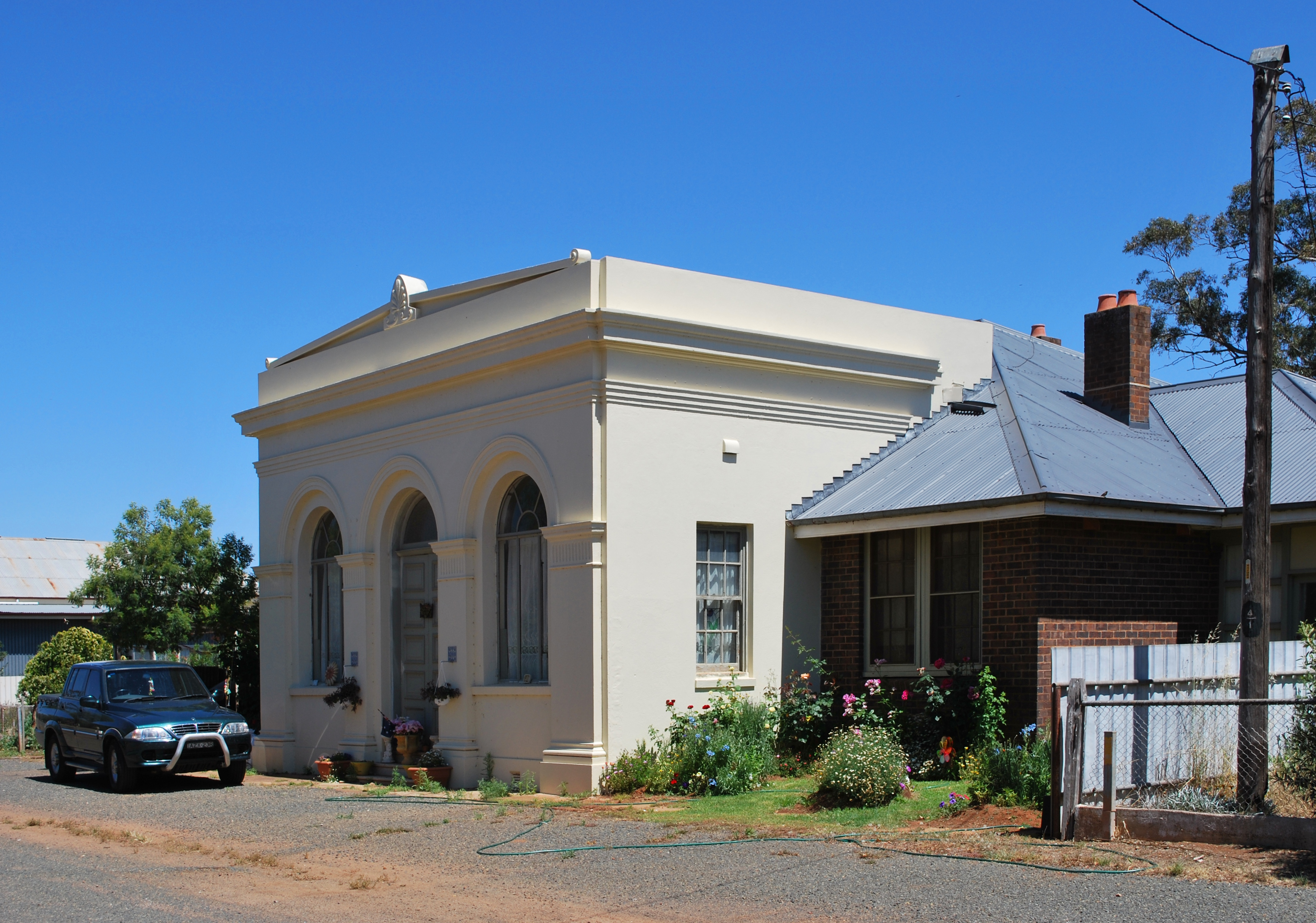
Former Bank

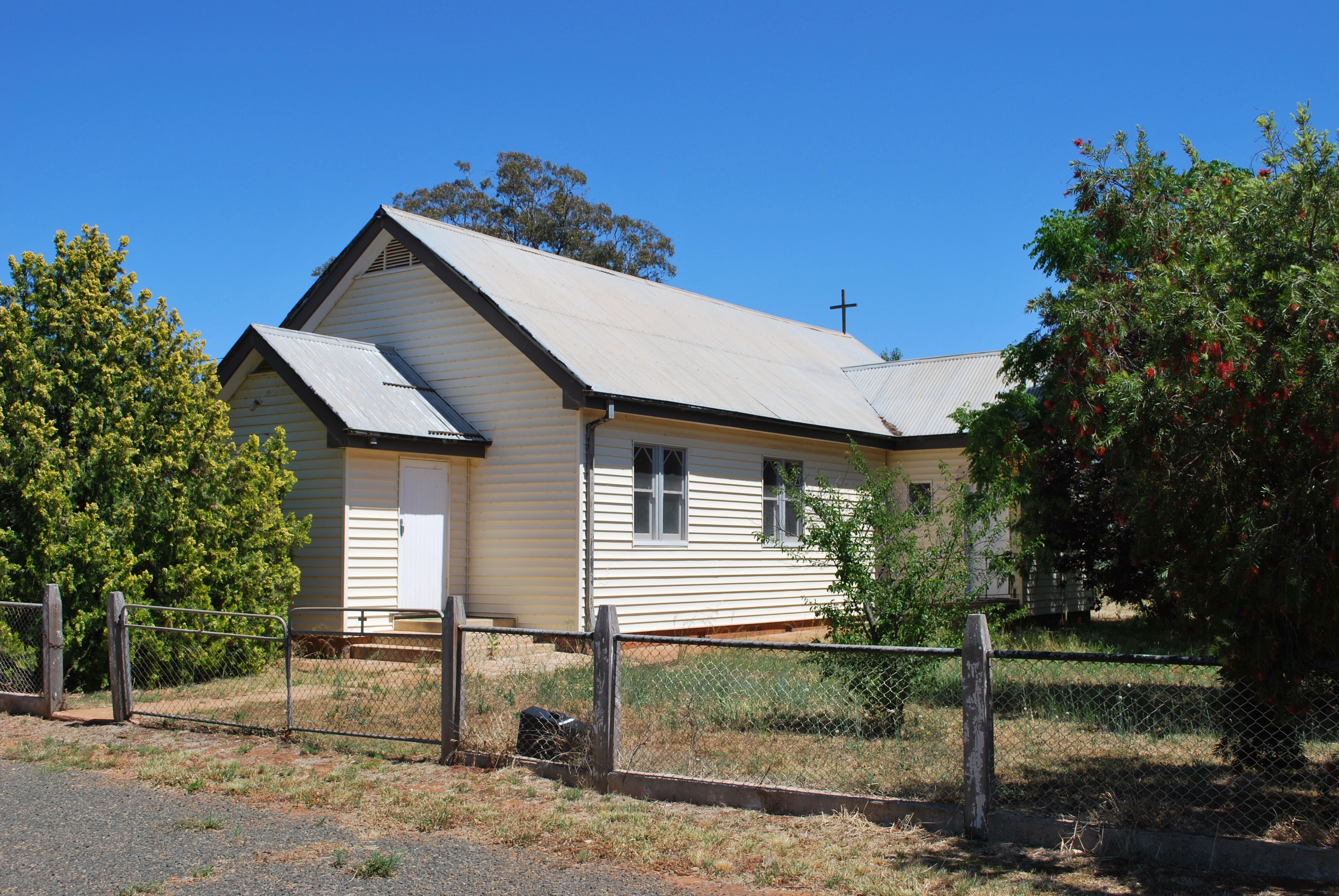
Church building

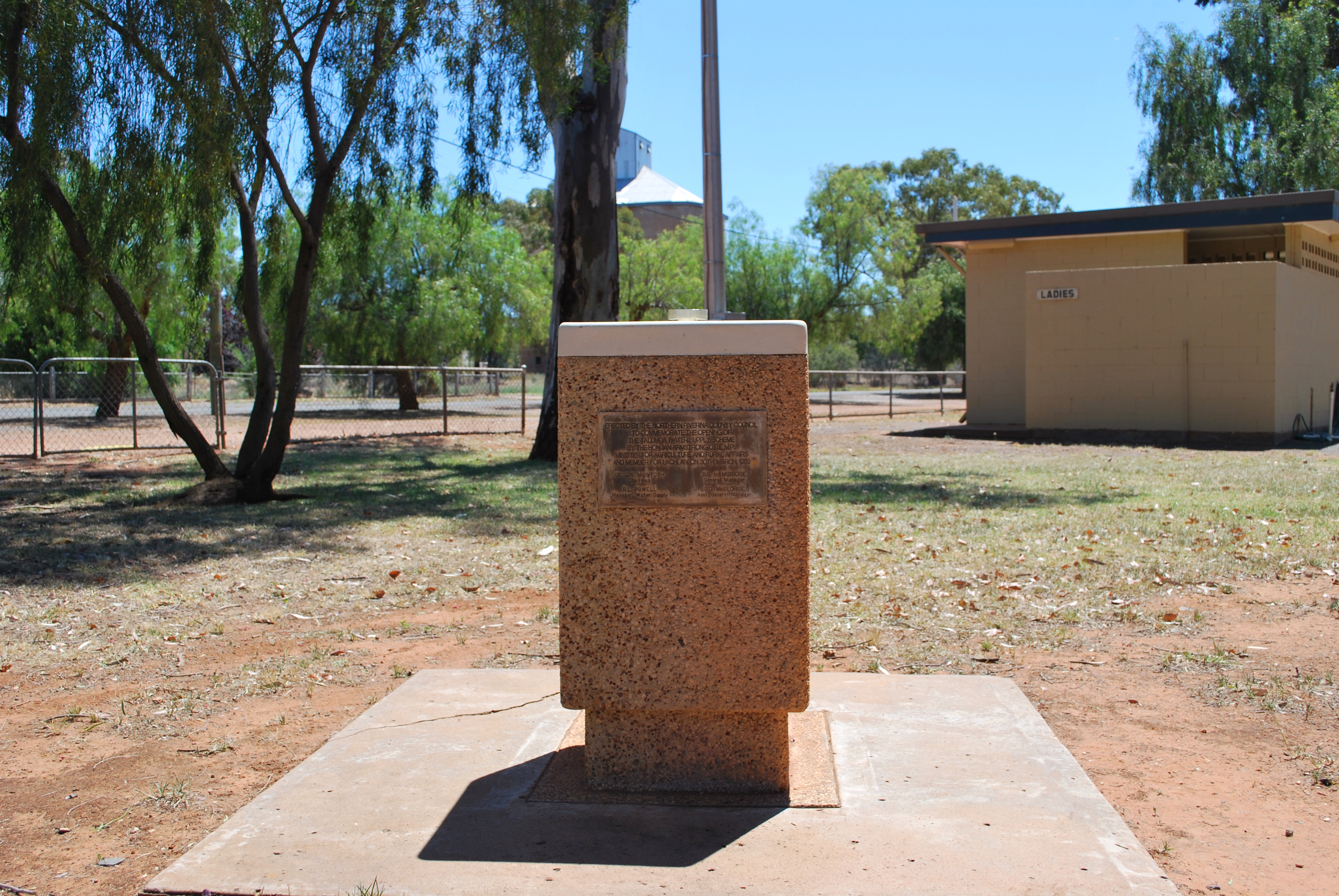
fountain

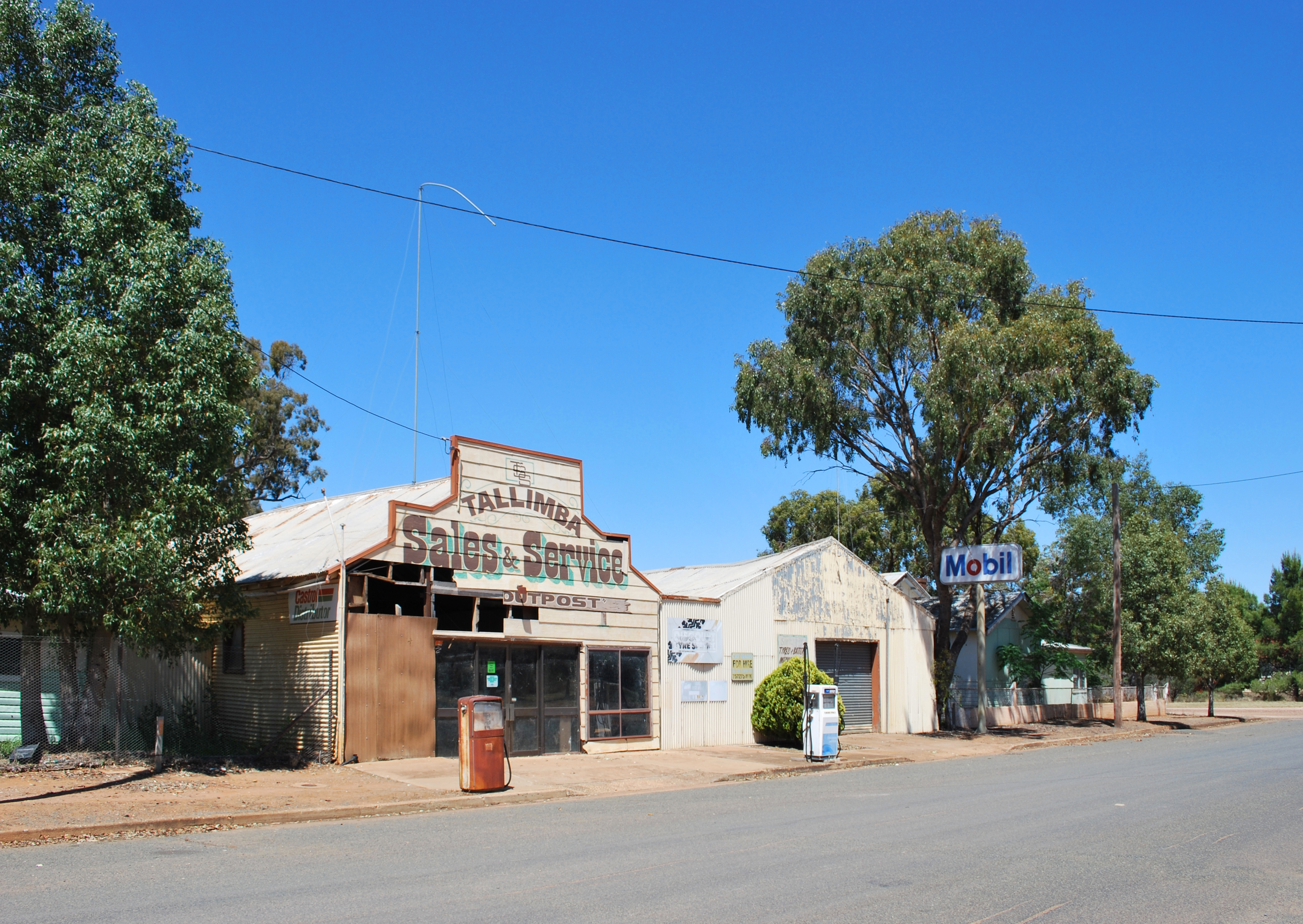
Tallimba Garage

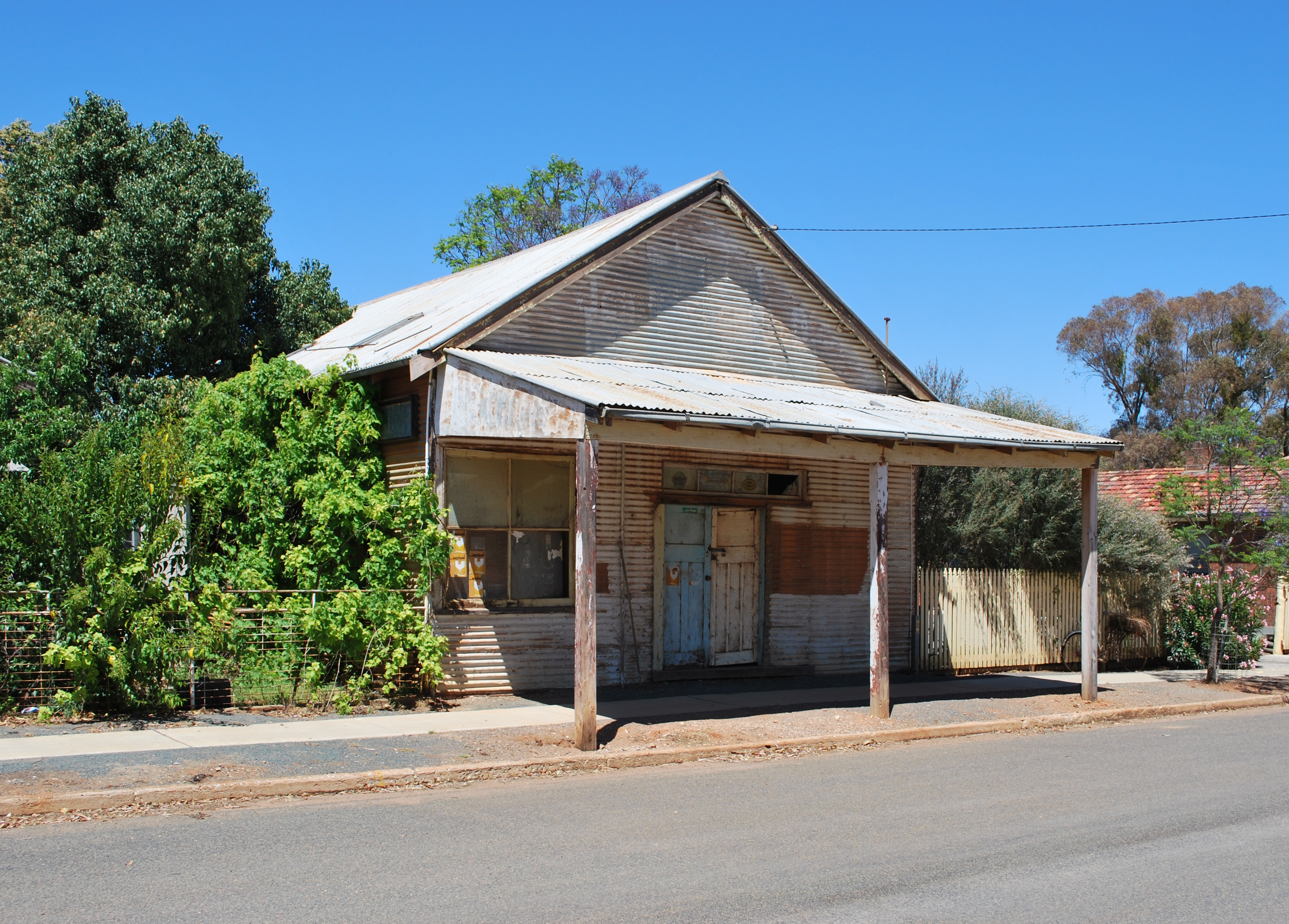
General Store

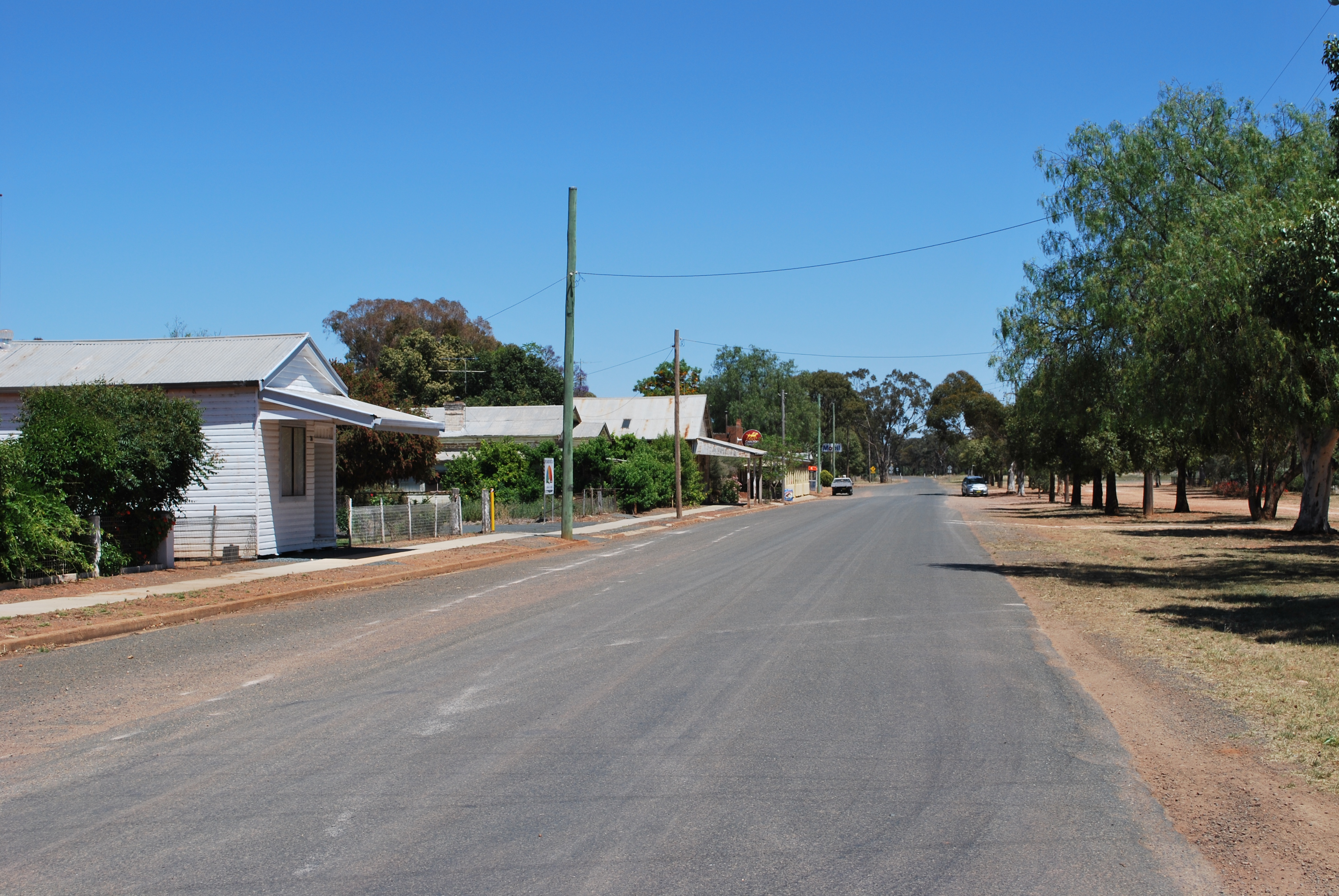
Main Street

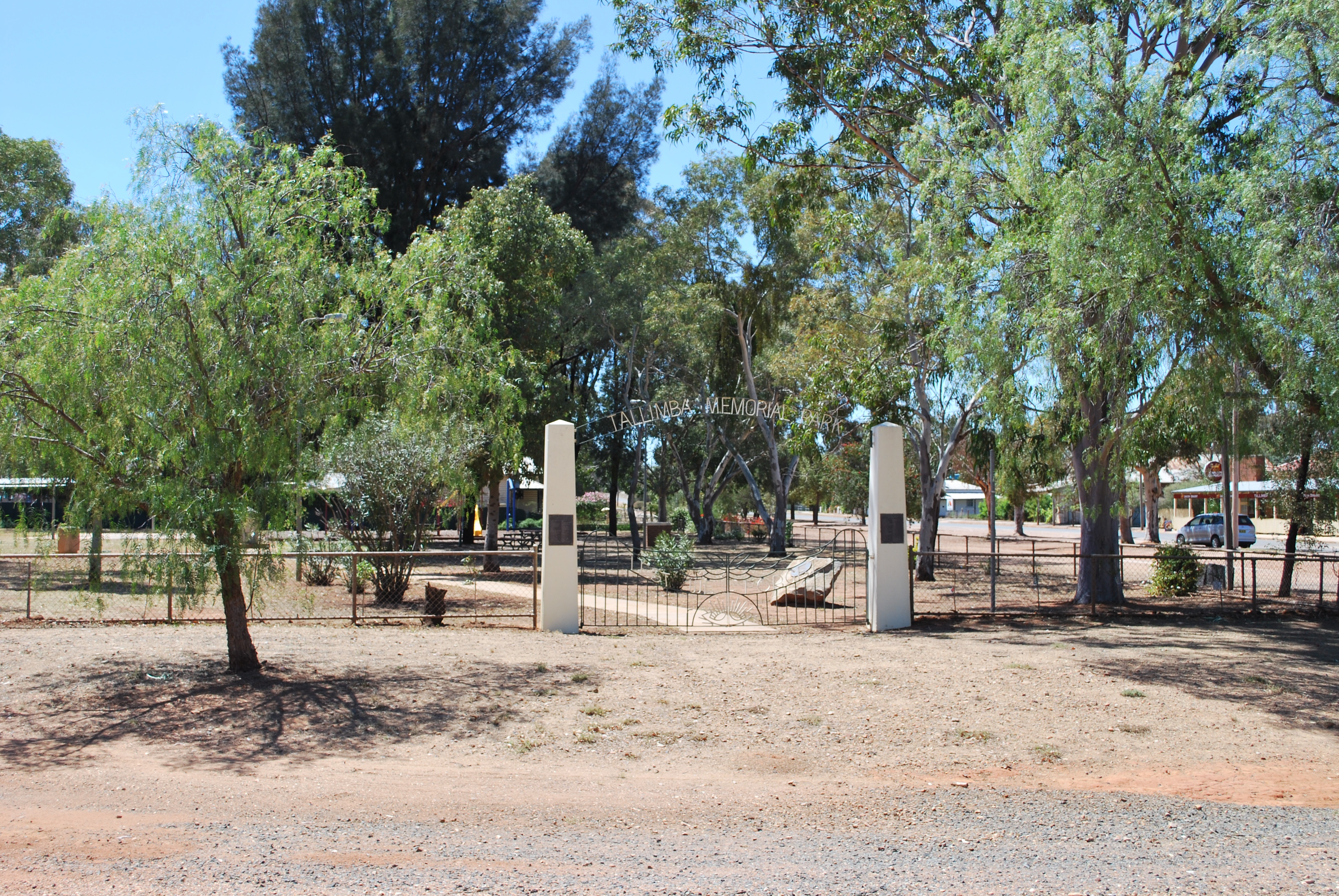
War memorial

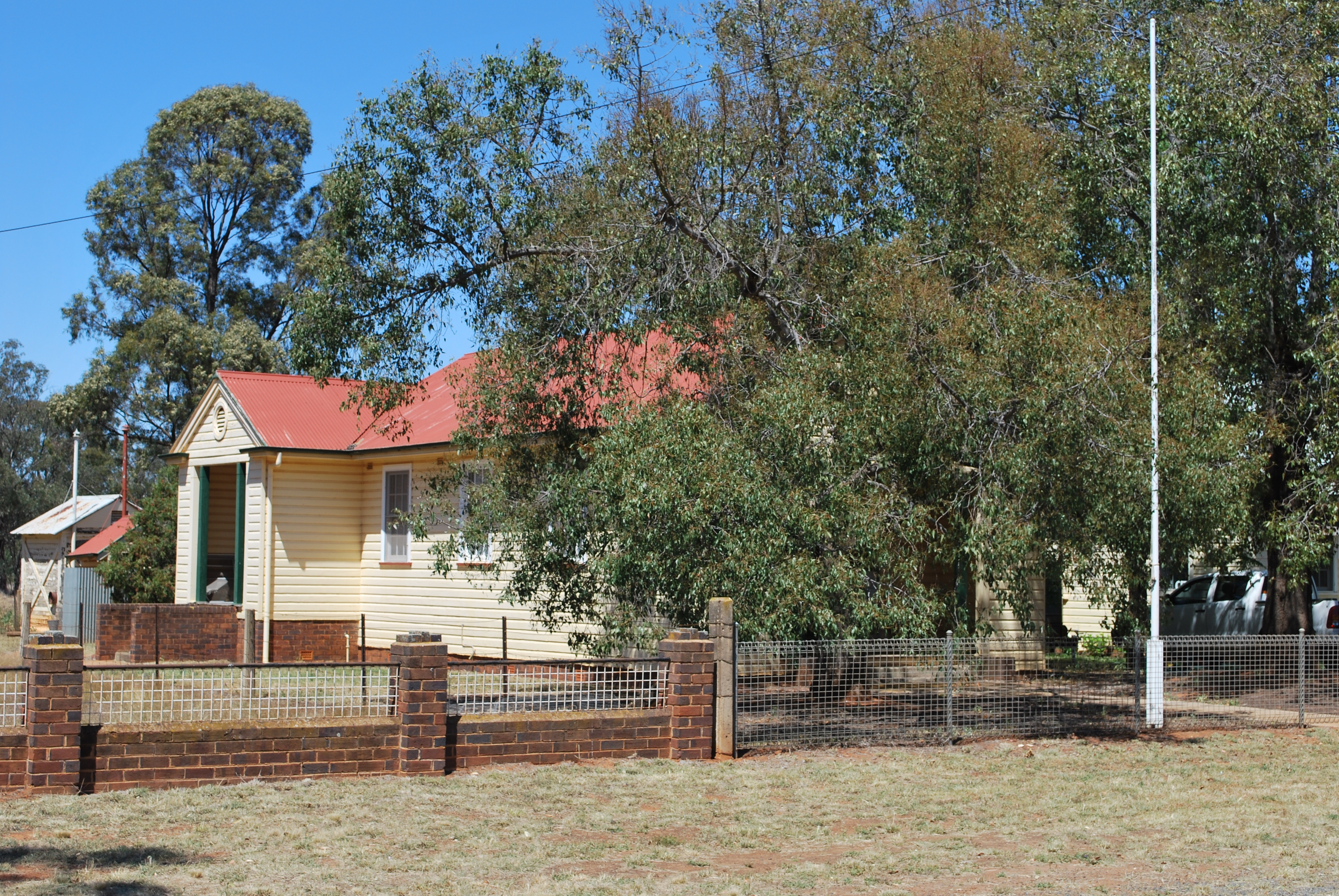
Police Station

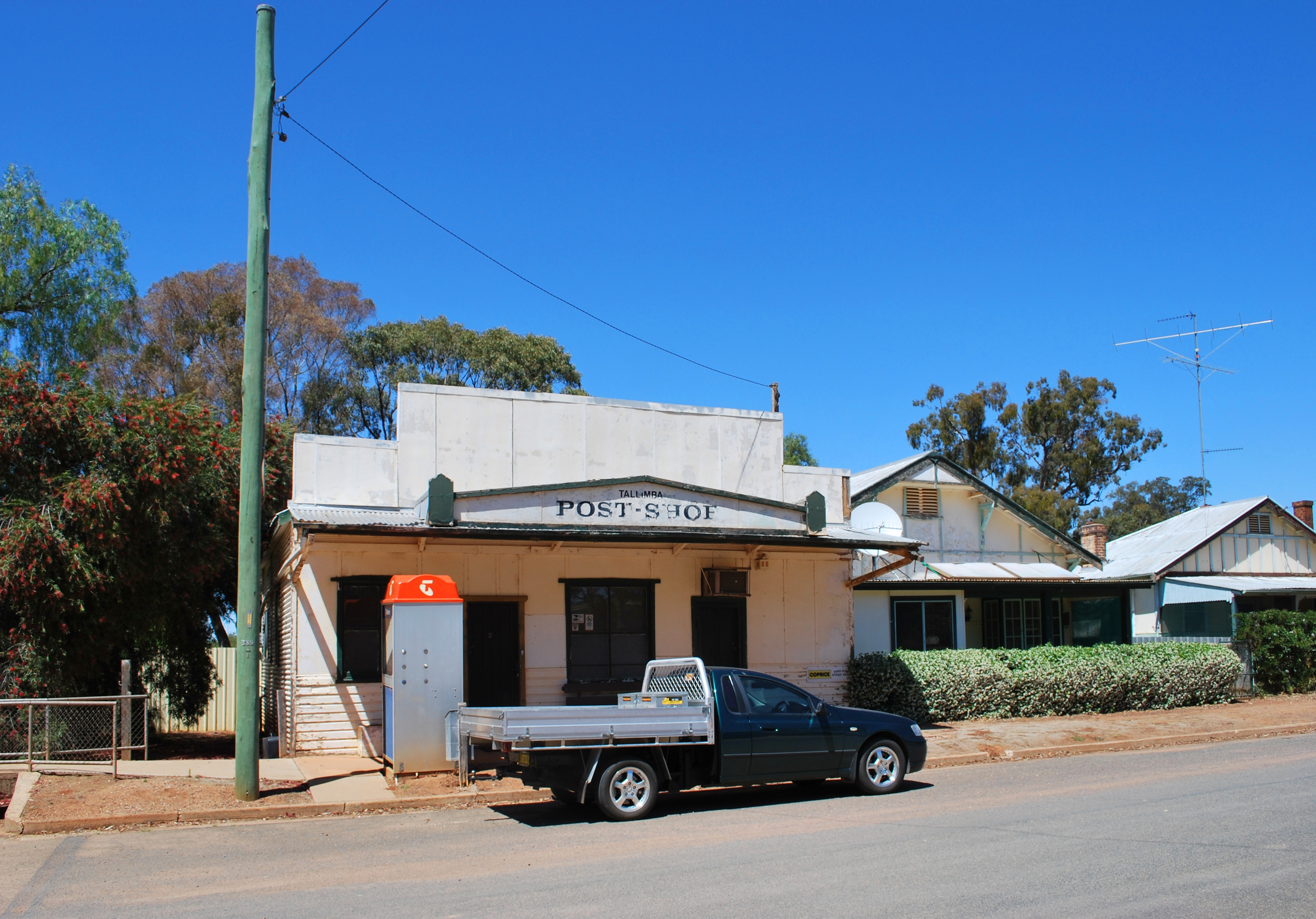
Post Office

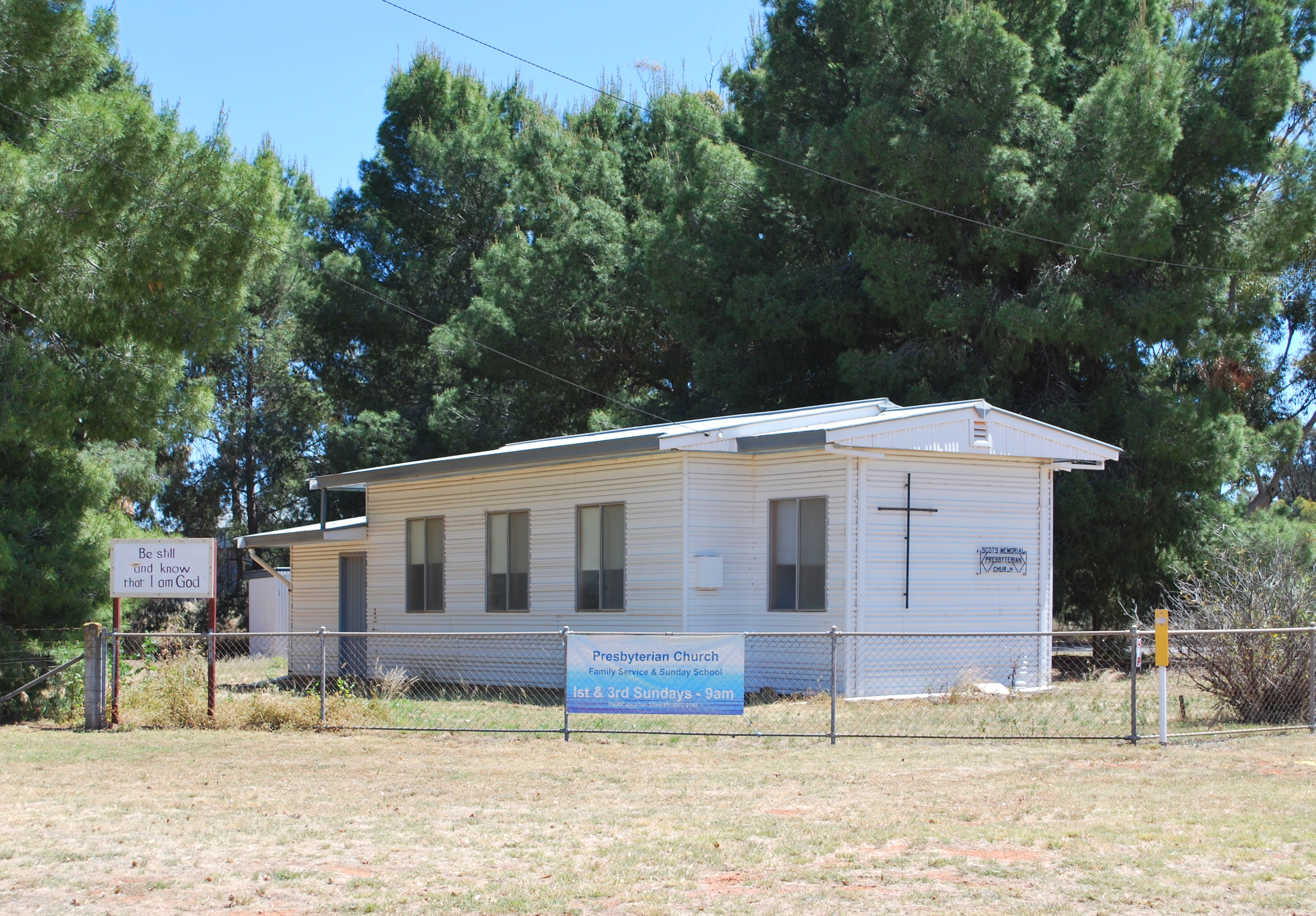
Presbyterian Church

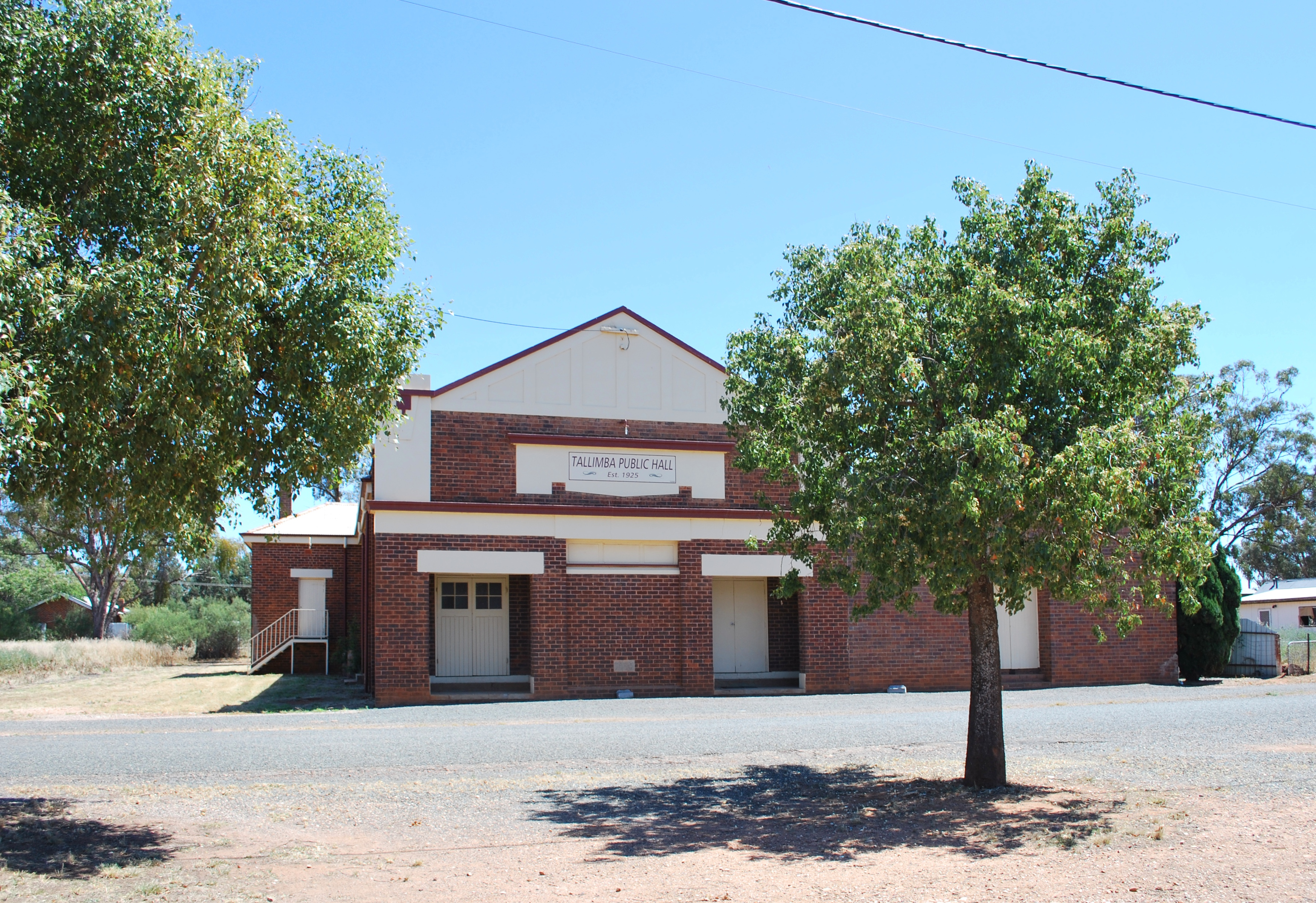
Public Hall

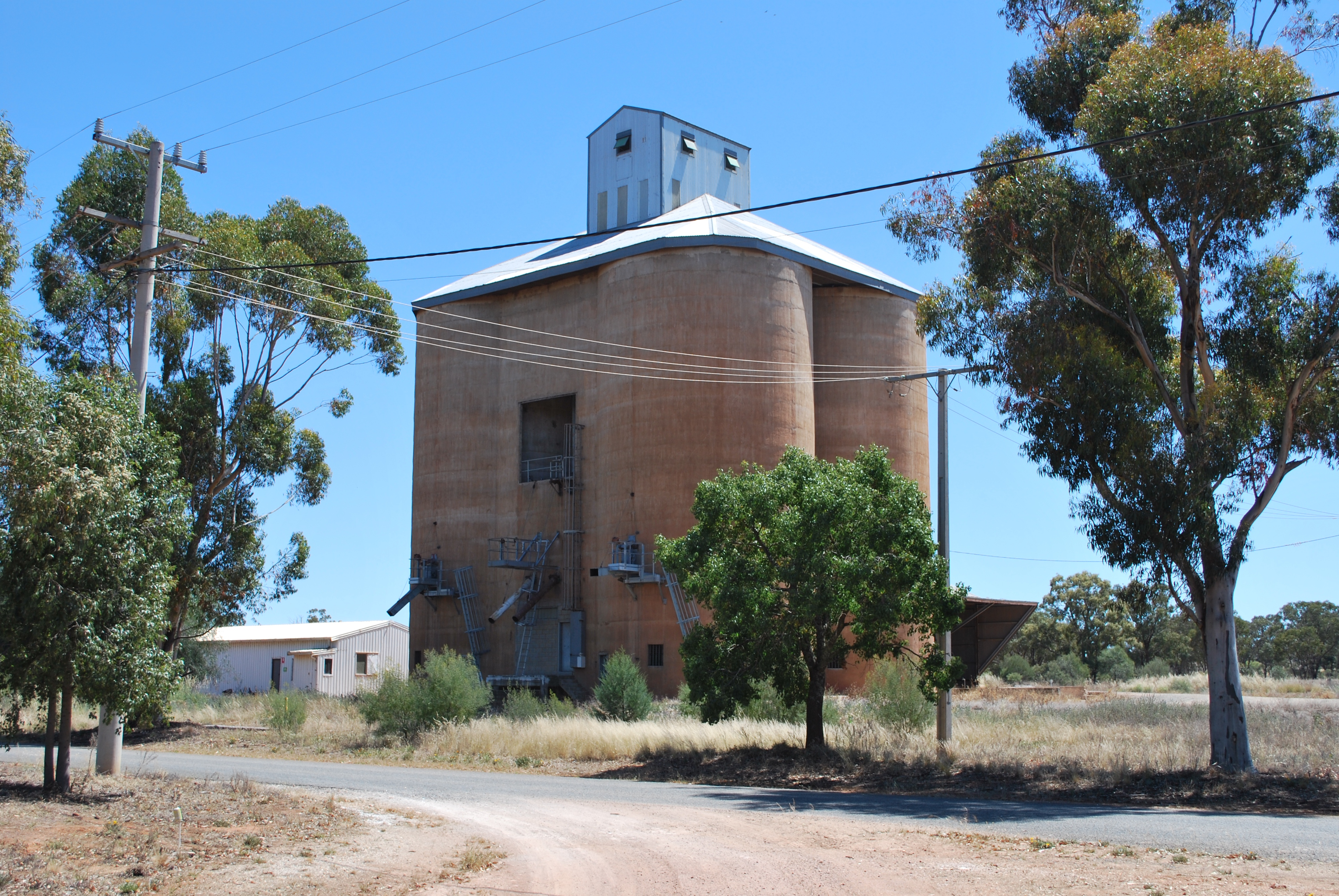
Silos

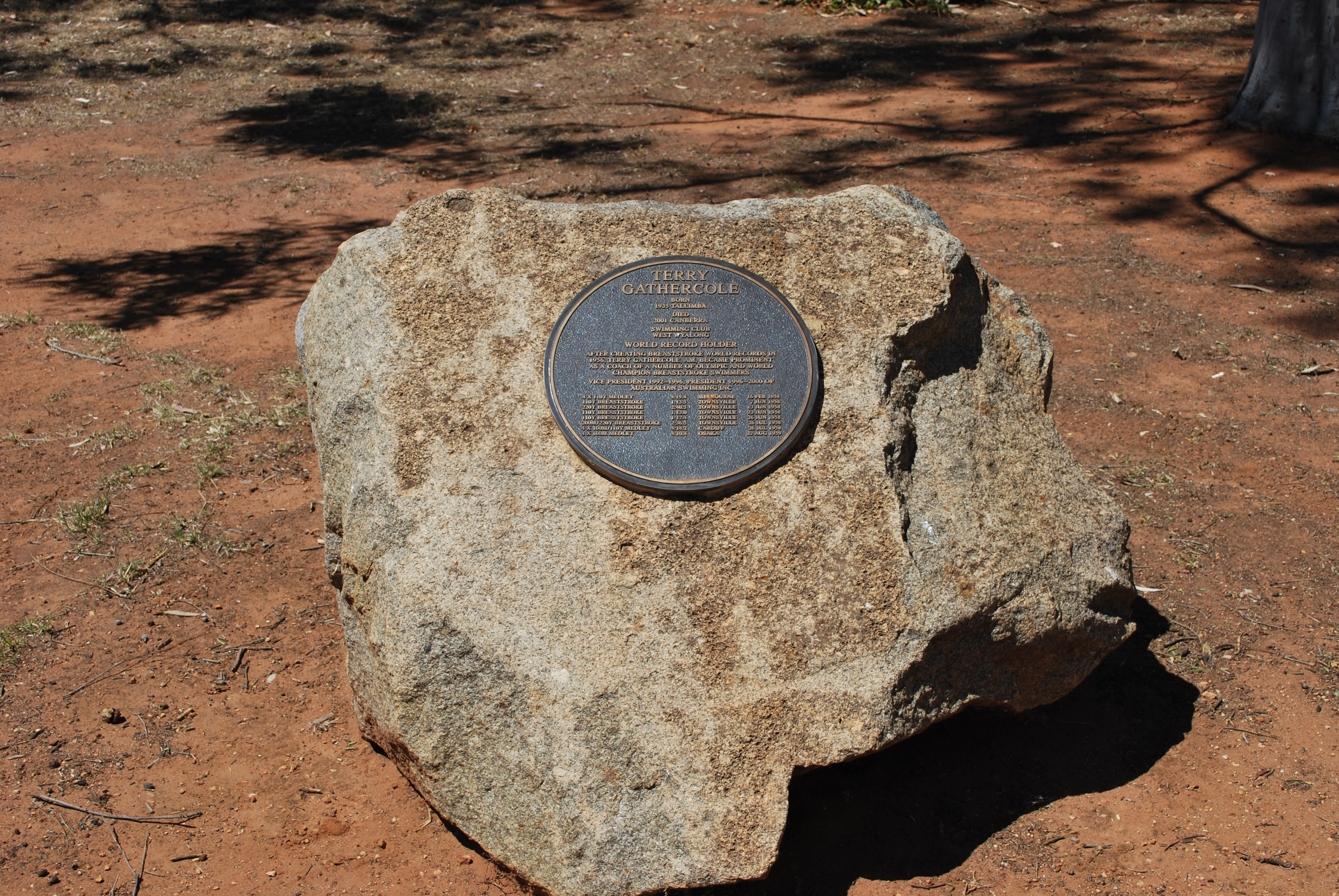
Memorial

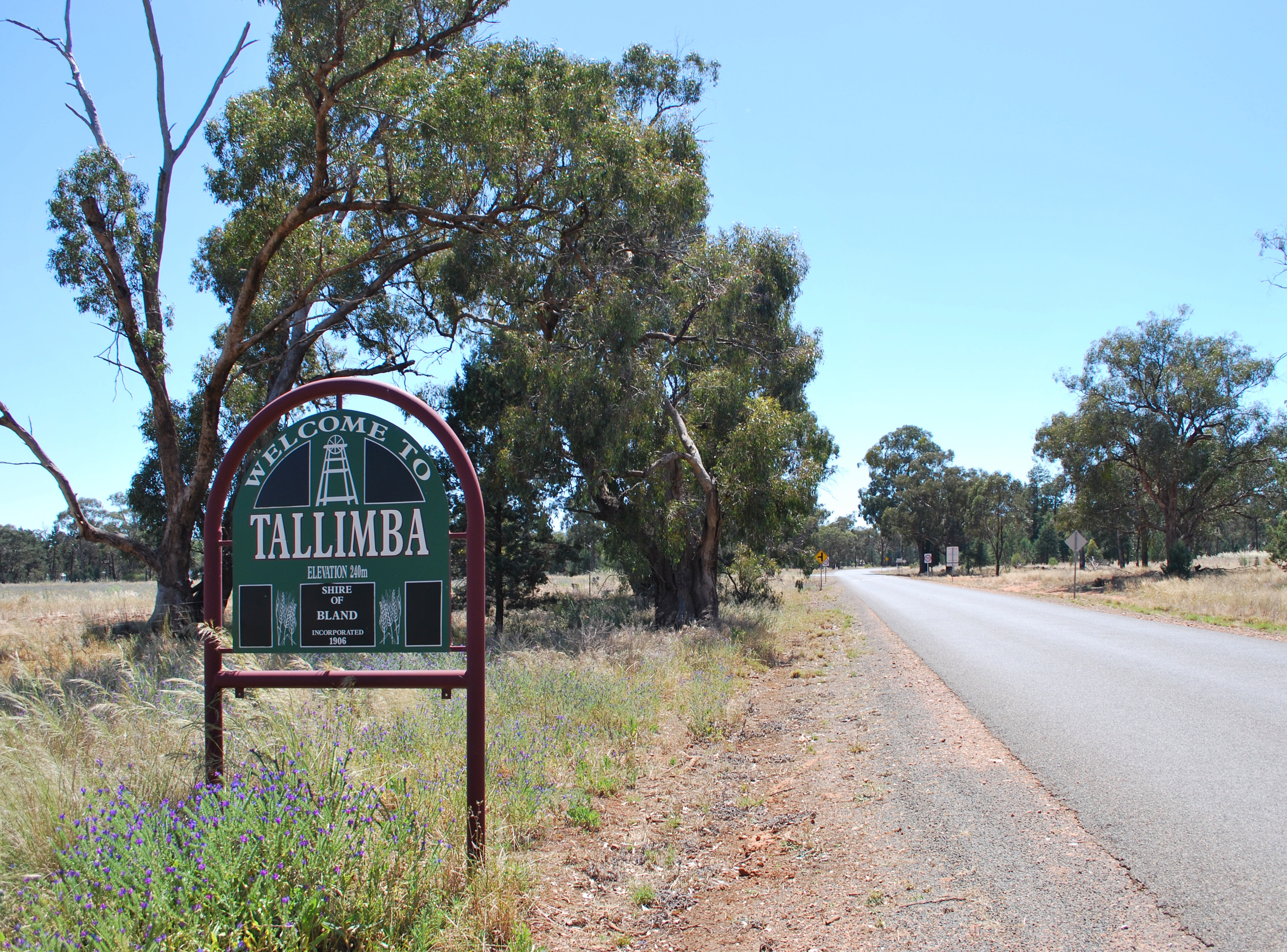
Outside Town

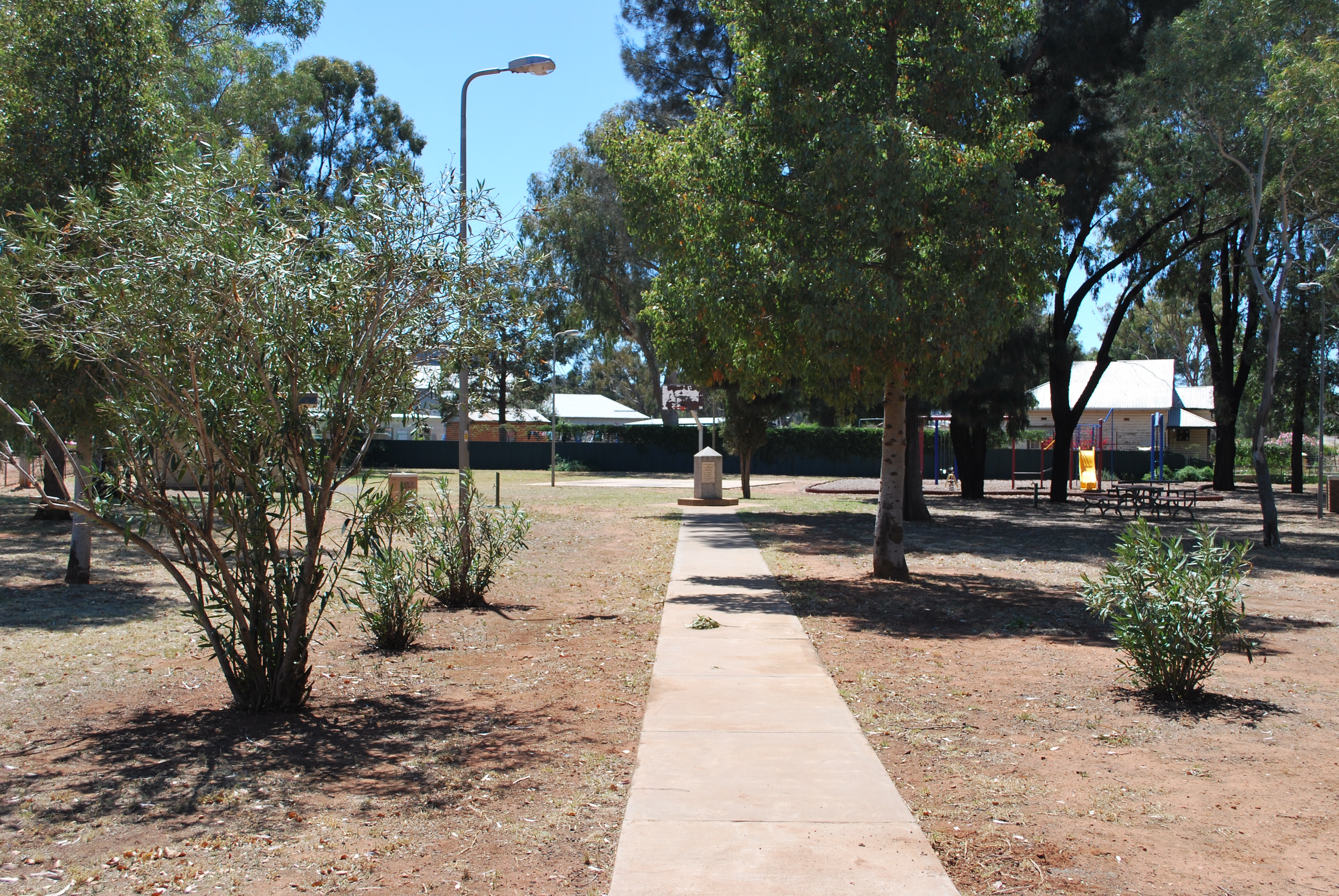
War Memorial

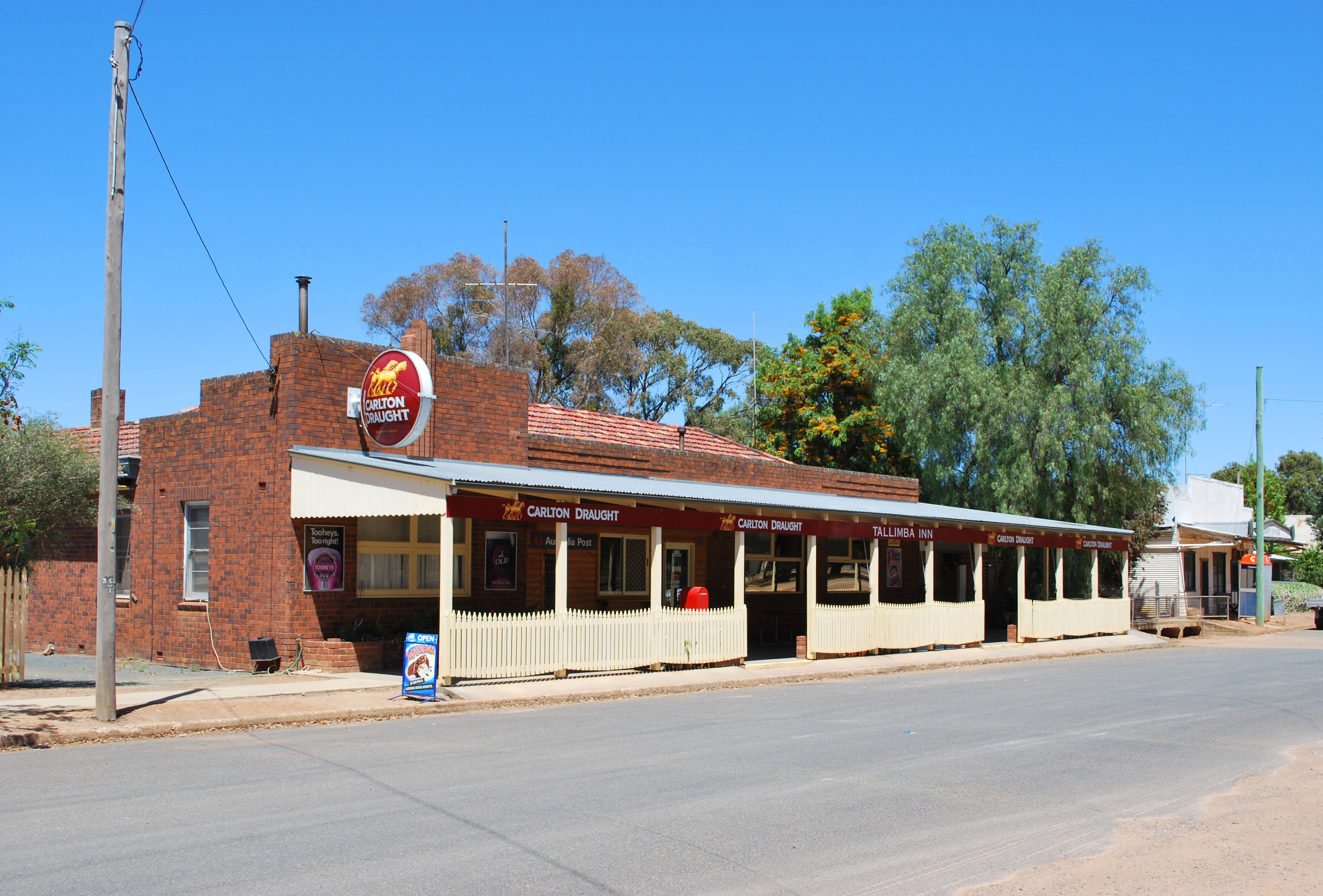
Hotel
