= Yalgogrin South, New South Wales =

Yalgogrin South New South Wales
- Coordinates: 34°10′0″S 146°49′00″E
- Elevation: 197 m (646 ft)
- Location: 21 km (13 mi) from Kamarah; 26 km (16 mi) from Ardlethan
- LGA(s): Coolamon Shire
- County: Cooper
- State electorate(s): Cootamundra
- Federal division(s): Riverina

Yalgogrin South is an unbounded rural locality within the locality of Ardlethan in the central north part of the Riverina. It is situated, by road, about 21 km north of Kamarah and 26 km north of Ardlethan.

The name Yalgogrin is derived from the local Aboriginal word for dead box tree.

The former village of Yalgogrin, better known as Yalgogrin North was at the locality now known as North Yalgogrin. which lies outside the Riverina area is about 40 km north of Yalgogrin South, past the village of Tallimba.
