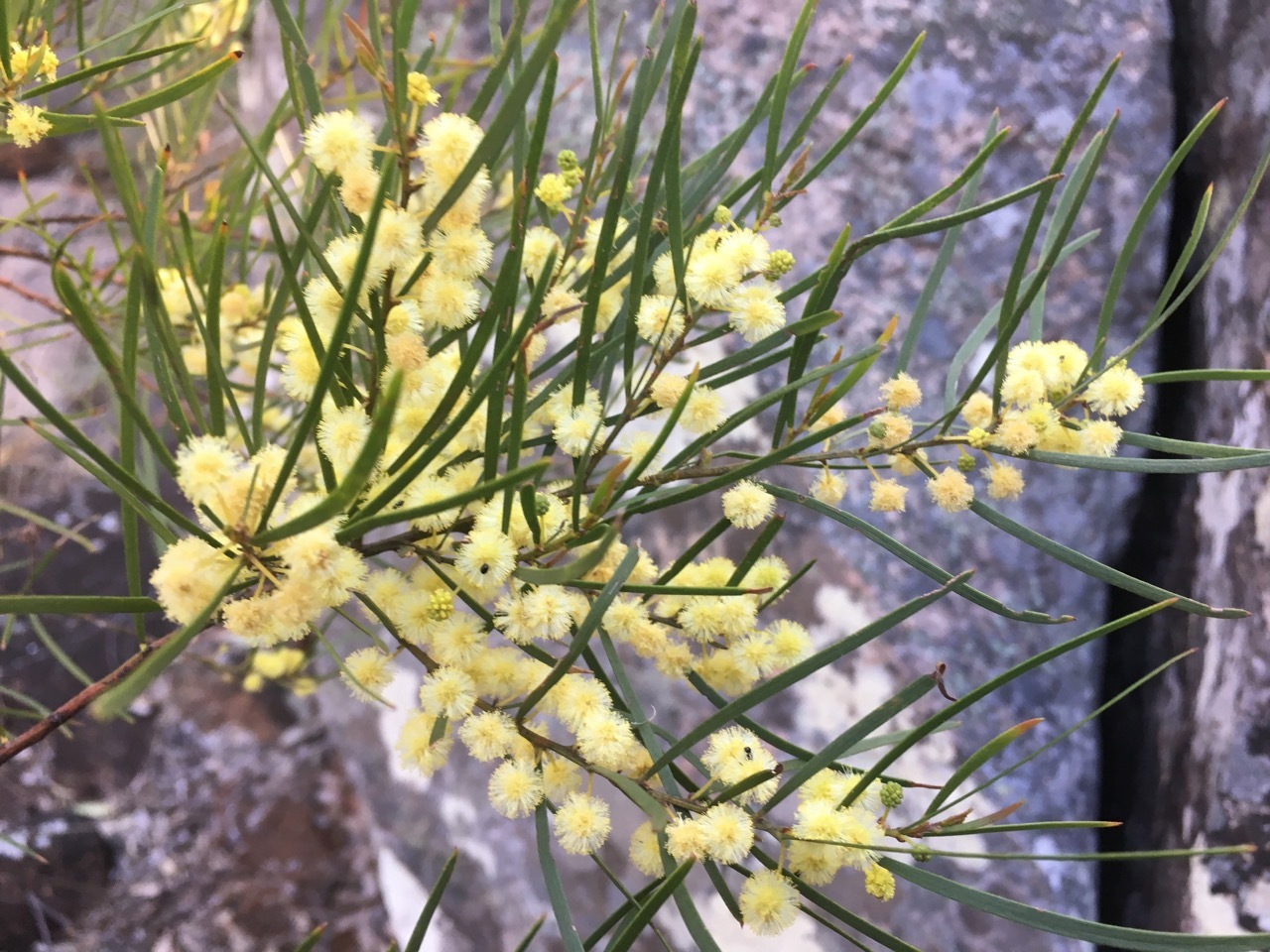
- Near Stanthorpe

Scientific classification
- Kingdom: Plantae
- Clade: Embryophytes
- Clade: Tracheophytes
- Clade: Spermatophytes
- Clade: Angiosperms
- Clade: Eudicots
- Clade: Rosids
- Order: Fabales
- Family: Fabaceae
- Subfamily: Caesalpinioideae
- Clade: Mimosoid clade
- Genus: Acacia
- Species: A. betchei

Binomial name
- Acacia betchei Maiden & Blakely
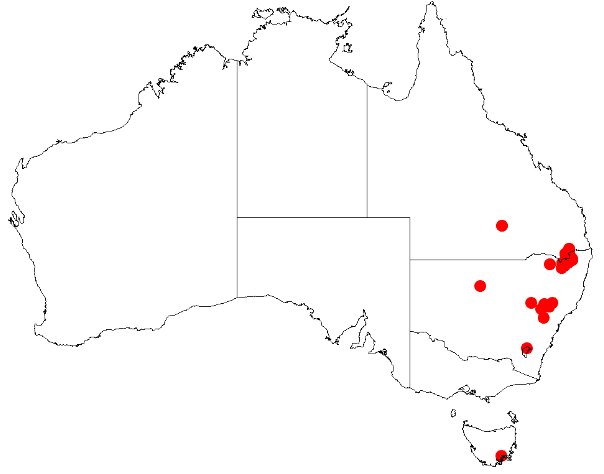
- Occurrence data from AVH

Synonyms
- Racosperma betchei (Maiden & Blakely) Pedley; Acacia adunca auct. non A.Cunn. ex G.Don: Maiden, J.H. (February 1912)

= Acacia betchei =

Red-tip wattle

Species of shrub

Acacia betchei, commonly known as red-tip wattle, is a species of flowering plant in the family Fabaceae and is endemic to eastern Australia. It is a shrub, or sometimes a tree, with narrowly linear phyllodes, pale to bright yellow flowers arranged in spherical heads in racemes, and linear to narrowly oblong, leathery to thinly crust-like pods up to 140 mm (5.5 in) long.

== Description ==
Acacia betchei is a shrub that typically grows to a height of 4 m (13 ft), sometimes a tree to 5 m (16 ft), with slender, glabrous, dark reddish branchlets. Its phyllodes are narrowly linear, 60–100 mm (2.4–3.9 in) long and 2–3 mm (0.079–0.118 in) wide. The flowers are arranged in racemes 15–50 mm (0.59–1.97 in) long in five to fifteen spherical heads, on thin peduncles mostly 3–8 mm (0.12–0.31 in) long. Each head has 12 to 28 pale to bright yellow flowers. Flowering has been observed from January to March, and it probably flowers in other months. The pods are leathery to thinly crust-like, linear to narrowly oblong, up to 140 mm (5.5 in) long and 5–7 mm (0.20–0.28 in) wide containing oblong black seeds 5.5–6.5 mm (0.22–0.26 in) long with a club-shaped aril.

This species is similar to Acacia adunca that has hooked phyllodes and somewhat larger flowers.

== Taxonomy ==
Acacia betchei was first formally described in 1927 by the botanists Joseph Maiden and William Blakely in 1927 in the Journal and Proceedings of the Royal Society of New South Wales. The specific epithet (betchei) honours Ernst Betche.

== Distribution and habitat ==
Red-tip wattle is found along the tablelands of the Great Dividing Range from Dalveen in south-eastern Queensland to Torrington in north-eastern New South Wales. It is found in sandy granite based soils as a part of forest communities.

== Conservation status ==
Acacia betchei is listed as of "least concern" under the Queensland Government Nature Conservation Act 1992.

== See also ==
- List of Acacia species
