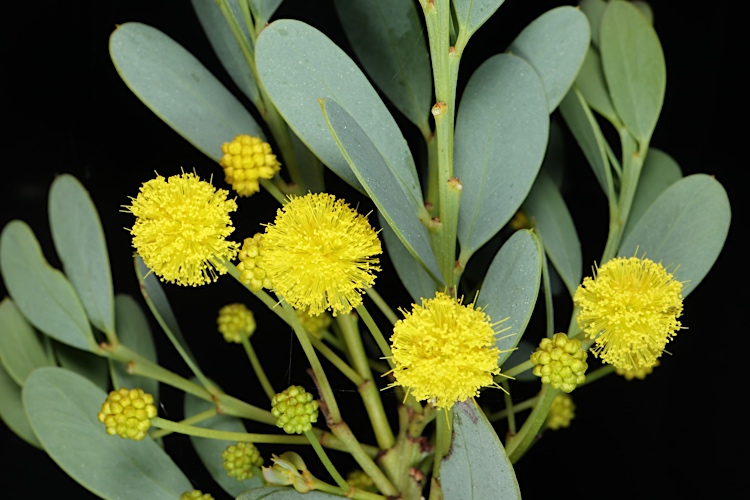
- In the ANBG

Scientific classification
- Kingdom: Plantae
- Clade: Tracheophytes
- Clade: Angiosperms
- Clade: Eudicots
- Clade: Rosids
- Order: Fabales
- Family: Fabaceae
- Subfamily: Caesalpinioideae
- Clade: Mimosoid clade
- Genus: Acacia
- Species: A. brachybotrya

Binomial name
- Acacia brachybotrya Benth.
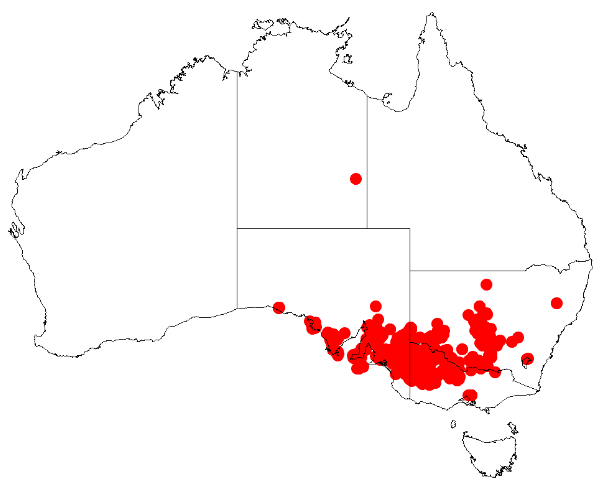
- Occurrence data from AVH

Synonyms
- List: Acacia brachybotrya Benth. f. brachybotrya; Acacia brachybotrya f. glabra Benth.; Acacia brachybotrya f. glaucophylla Benth. nom. inval.; Acacia brachybotrya Benth. var. brachybotrya; Acacia brachybotrya var. glabra (Benth.) Maiden; Acacia brachybotrya var. glaucophylla (Benth.) Maiden; Racosperma brachybotryum (Benth.) Pedley

= Acacia brachybotrya =

Species of plant

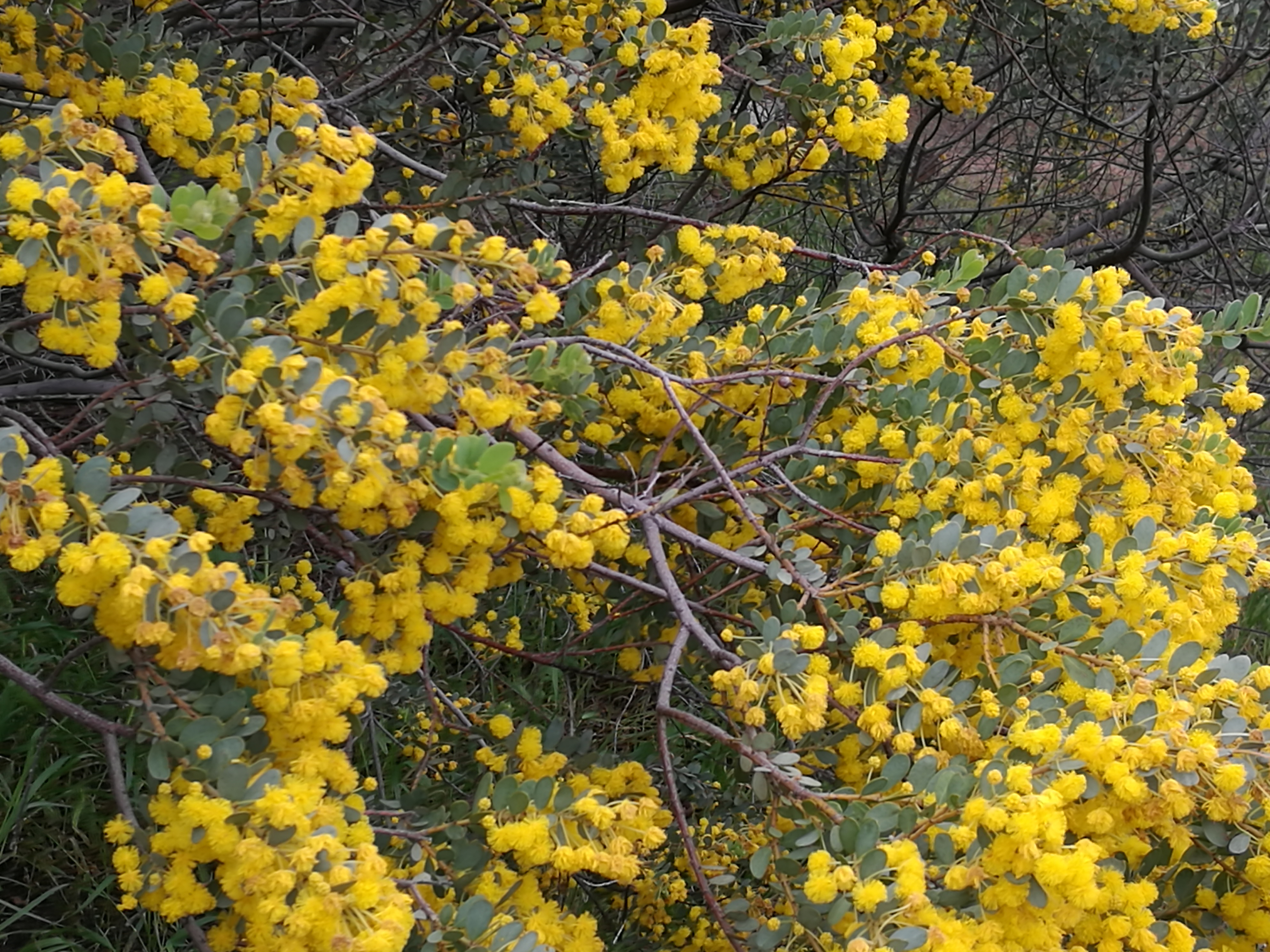
Near the Edward River

Acacia brachybotrya, commonly known as grey mulga or grey wattle, is a species of flowering plant in the family Fabaceae and is endemic to the south-east of continental Australia. It is a dense, round, erect or spreading shrub with usually densely hairy branchlets, variably shaped phyllodes, spherical heads of golden-yellow flowers, and linear, firmly papery to leathery pods.

== Description ==
Acacia brachybotrya is a dense, round, erect or spreading shrub that typically grows to a height of 1–3 m (3 ft 3 in – 9 ft 10 in) high and often wider. Its phyllodes are variable in shape, often lance-shaped to egg-shaped with the narrower end towards the base, greyish-green to glaucous, 10–35 mm (0.39–1.38 in) wide and 5–12 mm (0.20–0.47 in) wide. The flowers are borne on racemes 0.5–2 mm (0.020–0.079 in) long with up to four spherical heads on peduncles 5–12 mm (0.20–0.47 in) long, each head with 28 to 36 golden-yellow flowers. Flowering occurs from July to November and the pods are linear, almost like a string of beads, firmly papery to leathery, up to 90 mm (3.5 in) long and 5–11 mm (0.20–0.43 in) wide. The seeds are 4.0–5.5 mm (0.16–0.22 in) long and brown to black with an aril on the end.

== Taxonomy ==
Acacia brachybotrya was first formally described in 1842 by the botanist George Bentham in Hooker's's London Journal of Botany from specimens collected on "Peel's Range" in New South Wales by Allan Cunningham. The specific epithet (brachybotrya) is from the Greek words brachys meaning 'short' and botrys meaning 'spike', in reference to the flower being supported on a short penduncle.

== Distribution ==
Grey mulga is distributed widely throughout semi-arid parts of south eastern Australia from around Yalata in the west of South Australia to around Bendigo in Victoria in the east and as far north as Nymagee in New South Wales where it is found growing in many different soil types, often in part of mallee communities.

== See also ==
- List of Acacia species
