= Coolamon, New South Wales =

Coolamon New South Wales
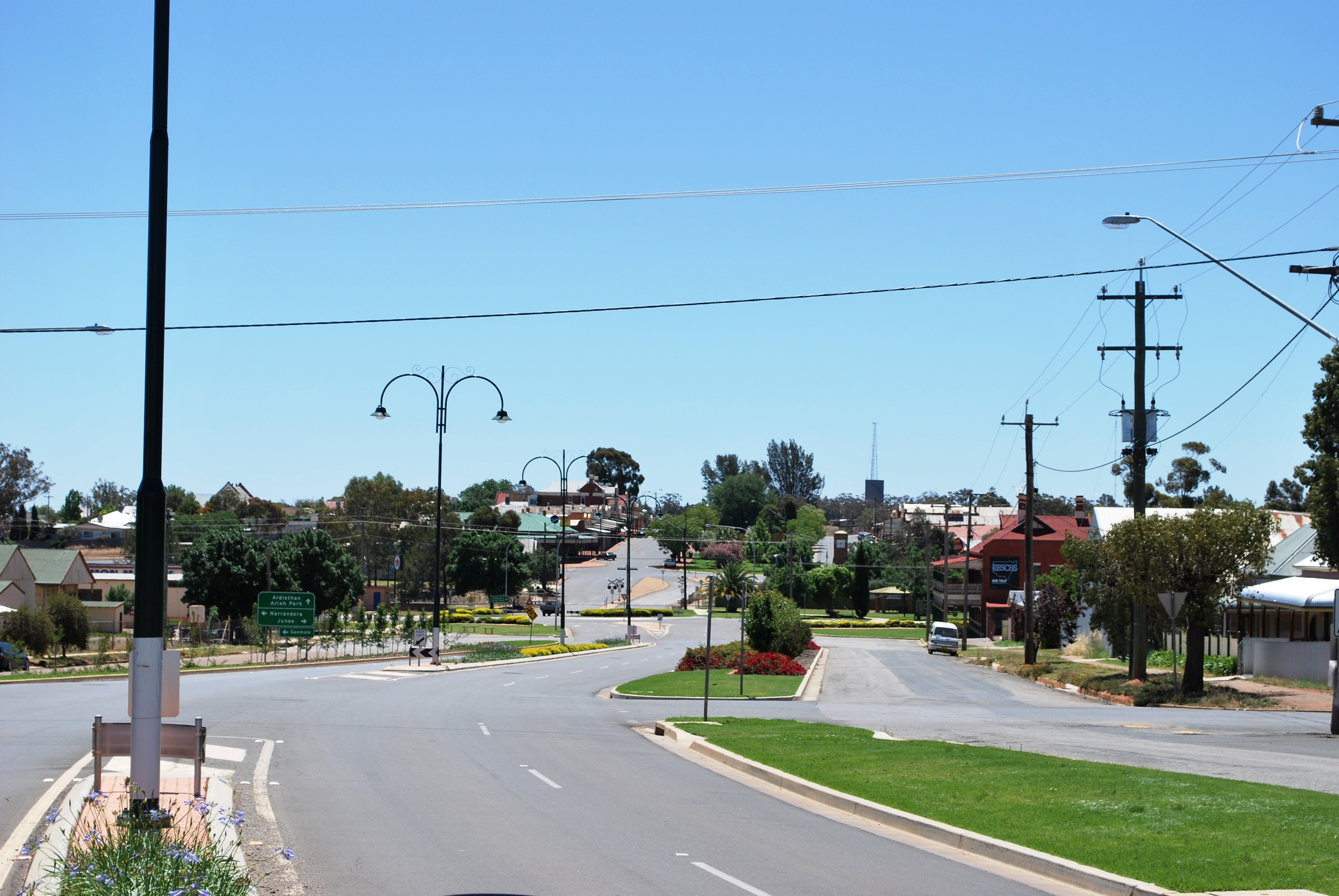
- Coolamon seen as entering from the Wagga Wagga Road

- Coordinates: 34°49′55″S 147°12′04″E
- Population: 2,275 (2021 census)
  - Density: 570/km^{2} (1,470/sq mi)
- Established: 3 October 1881
- Postcode(s): 2701
- Elevation: 290 m (951 ft)
- Area: 4 km^{2} (1.5 sq mi)
- Time zone: AEST (UTC+10:00)
  - Summer (DST): AEDT (UTC+11:00)
- Location: 506 km (314 mi) SW of Sydney; 482 km (300 mi) N of Melbourne; 255 km (158 mi) W of Canberra; 40 km (25 mi) NW of Wagga Wagga; 40 km (25 mi) W of Junee
- LGA(s): Coolamon Shire Council
- Region: Riverina
- County: Bourke
- Parish: Kindra
- State electorate(s): Cootamundra
- Federal division(s): Riverina

Coolamon (/ˈkʊlɑːˌmən, kʊlɑːˌmɒn/)is a town in the Riverina region of south-west New South Wales, Australia. Coolamon is 40 kilometres (25 mi) north-west of Wagga Wagga and 506 kilometres (314 mi) south-west of Sydney via the Hume and Sturt Highways. The town is situated on the railway line between Junee and Narrandera. Coolamon had a population of 2,275 at the 2021 census and is 290 metres (950 ft) above sea level. It is the administrative and service centre for the local government area which bears its name—Coolamon Shire.

== History ==
The name of Coolamon comes from the Aboriginal word for a basin-shaped wooden dish made and used by Australian Aboriginal people. In the area around the town are thousands of naturally occurring indentations in the ground called Coolamon Holes which fill with water.

The original land where Coolamon now stands, prior to European settlement, was occupied by the Wiradjuri Aboriginal peoples.

A property "Coleman" was first settled there by a Mr J. Atkinson in 1848. The town was surveyed prior to the coming of the railway in 1881.

Cowabbie Post Office opened on 1 May 1881 and was renamed Ganmain on 1 July and Coolamon on 1 November of that year.

At the outbreak of World War 1 Coolamon was hosting the then opposition leader The Right Hon. Andrew Fisher MP. who shortly before addressing a meeting in the Odd Fellow's hall received a telegram from the Prime Minister Joseph Cook advising him that the UK Government had declared war on Germany. He announced to the meeting that Australia would support Britain "to the last man and the last shilling" a line that he would repeat frequently throughout the war, but which was first used in Coolamon. Fisher became Prime Minister following an election held a month later.

== Heritage listings ==
Coolamon has a number of heritage listed sites, including the Up-To-Date Store which is listed in the NSW State Heritage Register, indicating a place or object that has significance for all of NSW.

Among the locally recognised heritage sites are:

- Shire Offices
- Court House and Police Station
- historic Post Office
- former Fire Station
- Railway Station and Station Master's Cottage
- Catholic, Anglican and Uniting Church Precincts
- RSL Building (now a museum)
- Coolamon Hotel

== Modern Coolamon ==
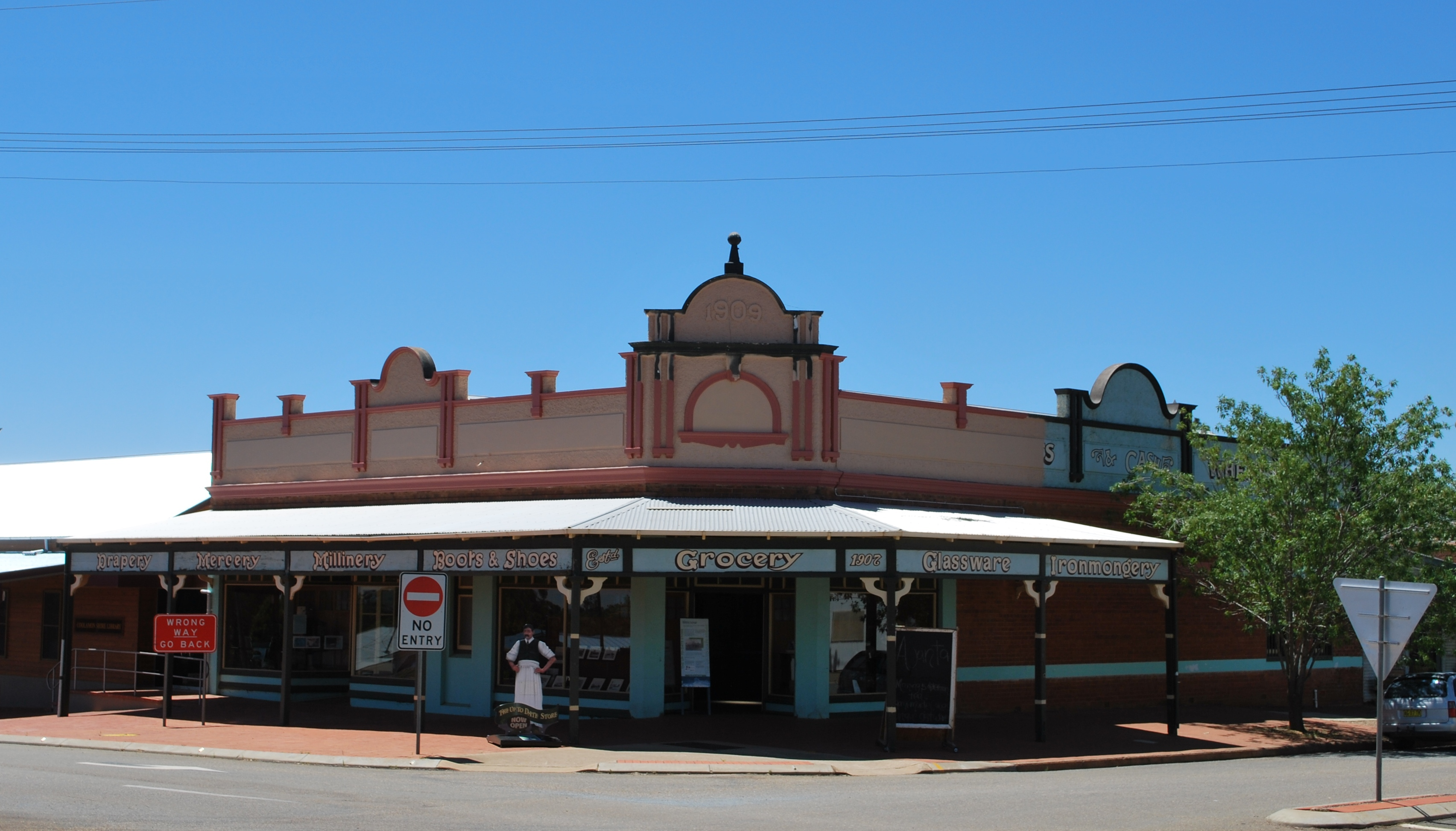
Up-To-Date Store

Coolamon is in the wheat belt of New South Wales and is a leading state producer of wheat and chaff. Wheat was first grown in the area in the 1850s. In addition, turkeys and wool are produced and the area is noted for the quality and plumpness of its lambs.

A major industry in the town is Coolamon Steelworks, fabricators of chaser bins.

The town's broad main street, which has been restored, retains much of its old world charm with its wrought-iron verandahs and awnings. Various bric-a-brac, antique shops, tourist coffee lounge, and a modern bread bakery and cafe invite passing tourists to stop and explore the town. The Up-to-Date store, designed by architect William Monks, has what is probably the only cash ball cash railway still in situ. In 2017 a boutique cheese factory was opened on the main street, as a working tourist attraction, and selling various hard and soft cheeses made on the premises.

Coolamon is home to active Rotary and Lions Clubs and a sub-Branch of RSL NSW.

Kindra State Forest is located at Coolamon.

== Sport ==
The most popular sport in Coolamon is Australian rules football, as it lies on the Canola Way, a geographical pocket stretching from the Grong Grong and Marrar, in which Australian football retains a strong following in the rugby league supporting state of New South Wales. The town's team, the Coolamon Rovers Football and Netball Club, known as the Coolamon Grasshoppers, which competes in the Riverina Football League.

The club also has a rugby league club known as the Coolamon Raiders. These days the club only fields junior teams, who compete in the Group 9 Junior Rugby League competition. They formerly completed in the Wagga Wagga Second Division competition, known as the Kennedy Shield, until the mid 1990s.

Coolamon is home to an 18-hole sand green golf course, 10 rink synthetic bowling green, four synthetic tennis courts and four touch football fields operated by the Coolamon Sports and Recreation Club.

== Railway station ==
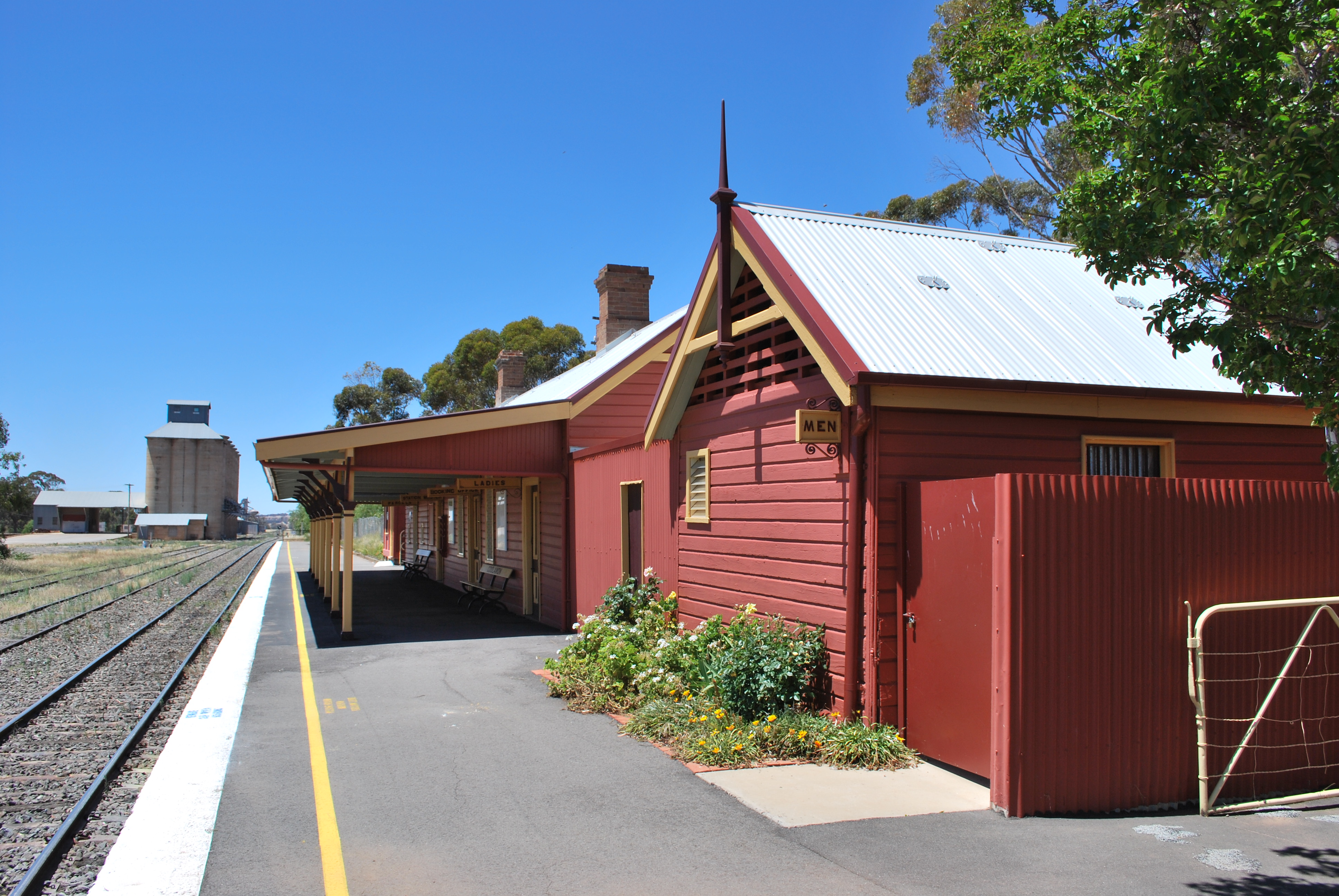
Coolamon railway station

Coolamon railway station opened in 1881 as Cowabbie Road. The station name was quickly changed to Coleman and finally the name Coolamon was settled on in 1895. The coming of the railway allowed greater ease in transporting the area's products to distant markets.

Coolamon is a served by the twice weekly NSW TrainLink Xplorer service operating between Sydney and Griffith. NSW TrainLink also operate a road coach service from Wagga Wagga to Griffith via Coolamon.
