= Lamson Engineering Company Ltd =

British engineering company

- Industry: Pneumatic tubes
- Founded: 1937
- Defunct: 1976
- Fate: Acquired
- Successor: Dialed Despatches
- Headquarters: Willesden Junction and Stoke on Trent
- Products: Cash delivery systems

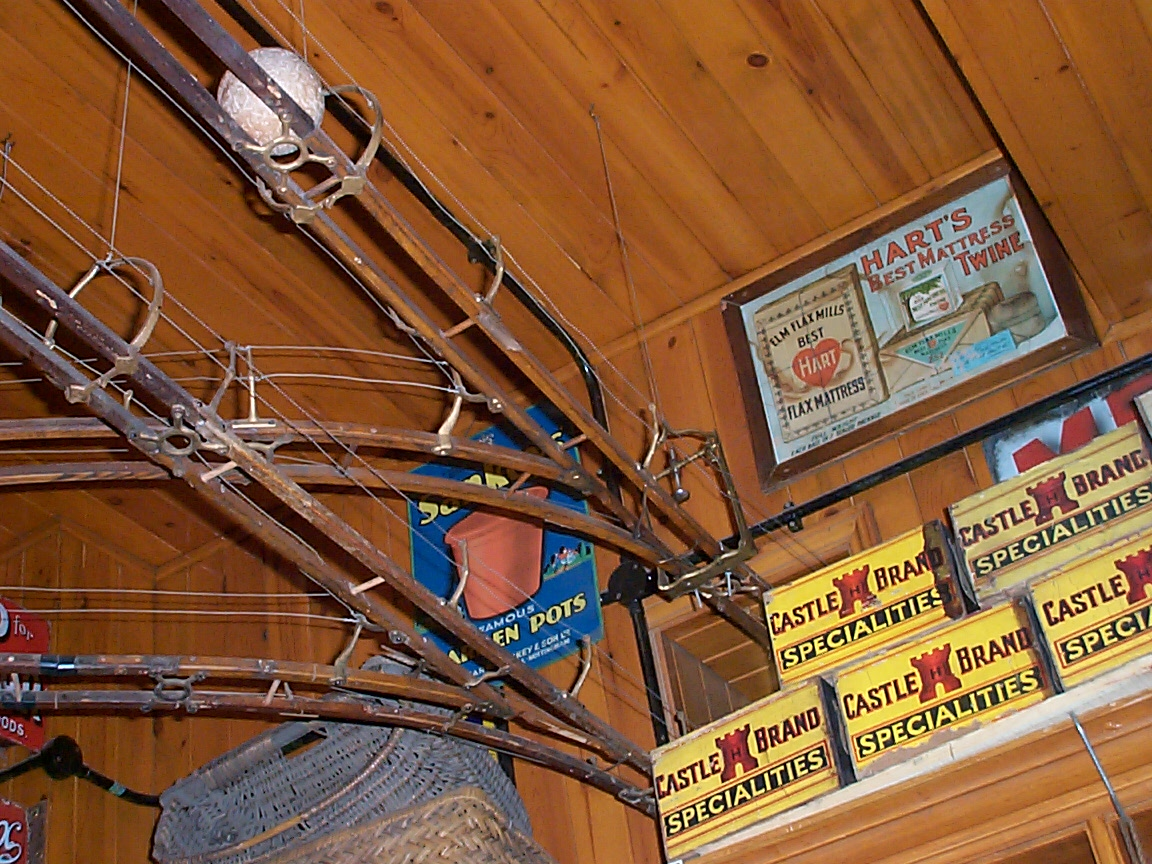
Cash Ball carrier at Beamish Museum

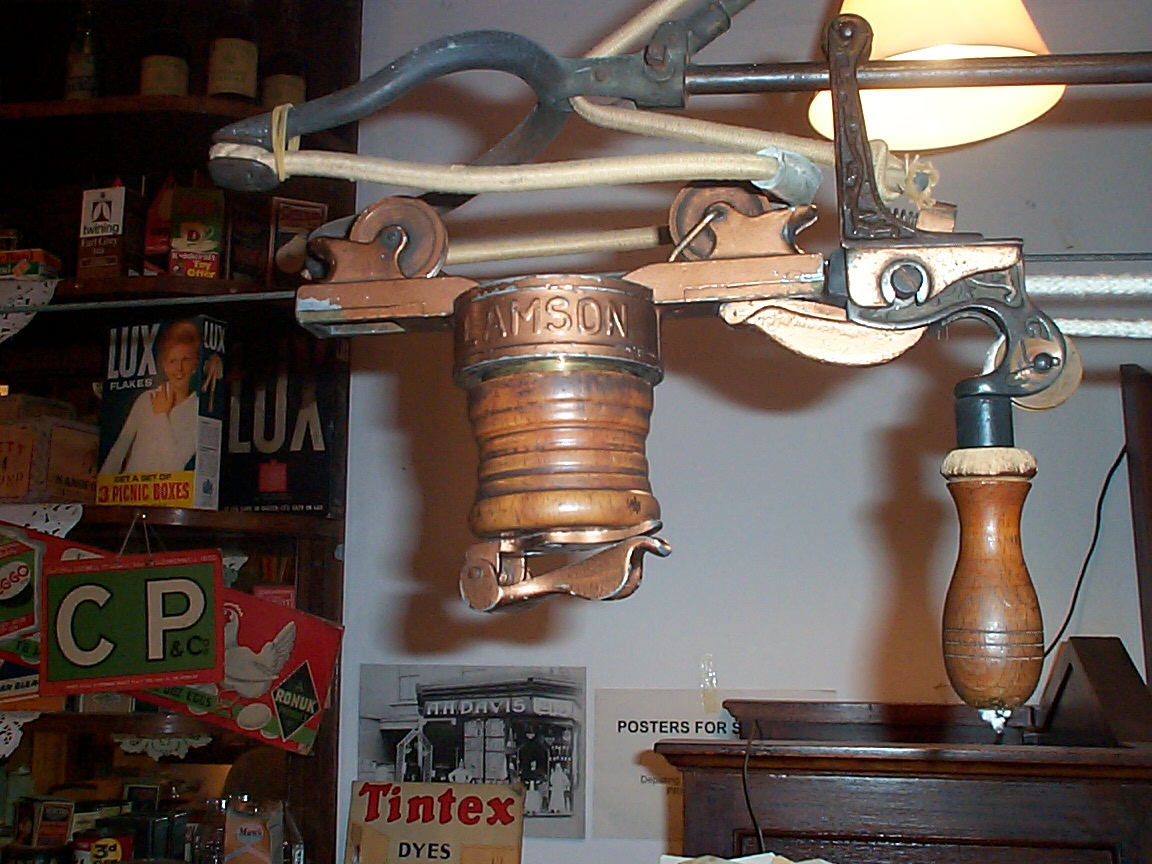
Reconstructed Rapid Wire system at Age Exchange, Blackheath, London

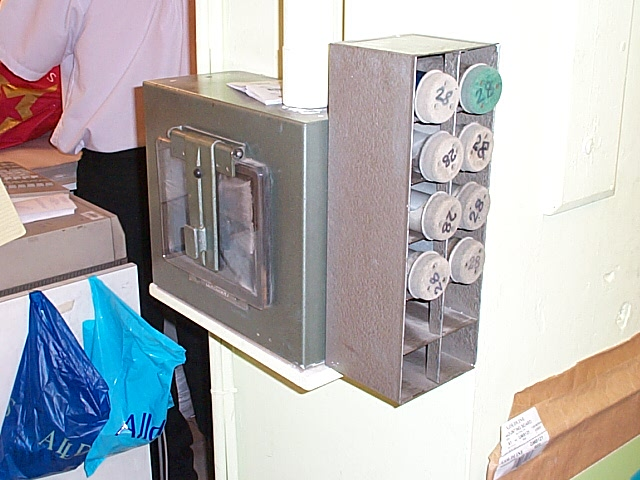
Pneu-Art pneumatic tube terminal at Arding & Hobbs department store, Clapham Junction, London

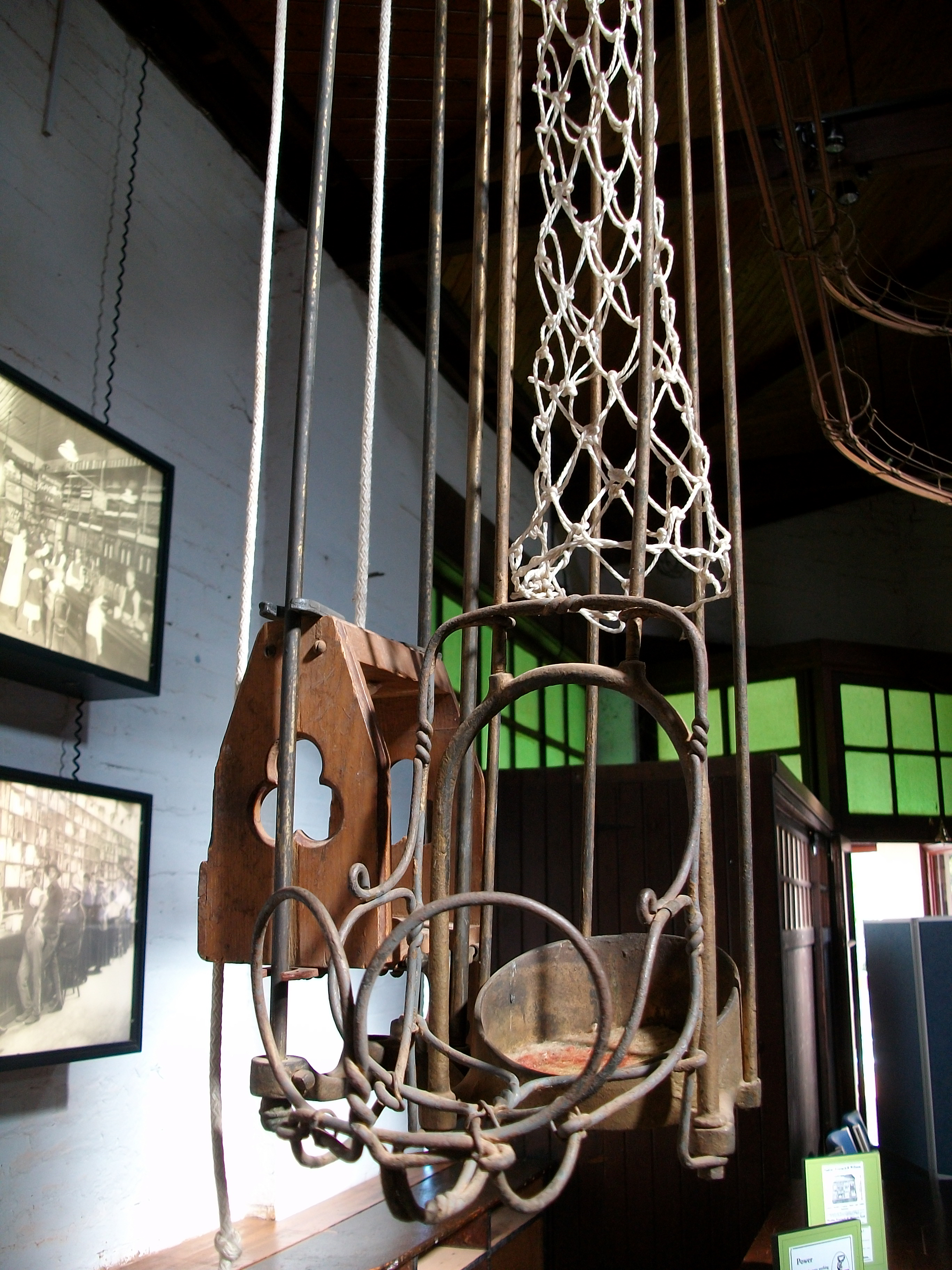
Cash ball system at the Up-To-Date Store in Coolamon, Australia

Lamson Engineering Company Ltd was the name between 1937 and 1976, of the British offshoot of the Lamson Cash Carrier Company (and its successors) of Boston, Massachusetts. The Lamson companies were the best-known manufacturers of cash carrier systems for shops, including cash ball, wire and pneumatic tube systems and of pneumatic tube systems for other applications.

== History ==
The Lamson Cash Carrier Company, was established in Lowell, Massachusetts and was founded by William Stickney Lamson and Meldon Stephen Giles in January 1882 to manufacture his invention of the Cash Ball system.

In 1884, John Magrath Kelly, an Irish-American from Boston, became an agent for the Lamson Cash Carrier Company in London, and the British Company was founded. By 1888, the Lamson Store Service Company Ltd was established at 1 Charlotte Street, Bedford Square, London, WC. With capital of £85,000 (£9,552,078 as of 2025) the company had rights to the ball system for Europe, Africa, Australia, New Zealand and the Middle East, with UK patent 18566.

In 1889, the company was renamed the Lamson Paragon Supply Company through an amalgamation of the Paragon Check Book Co with the Lamson Store Service Company. Shortly afterwards, they started selling the Rapid Wire systems in Britain.

In 1897, the Bostedo Package and Cash Carrier Company launched its products in Britain. It was bought out two years later when Lamson renamed it the Lamson Pneumatic Tube Company.

Subsidiary companies were established in Australia in 1889 and New Zealand in 1905. In 1911, all manufacturing was consolidated at a single factory on Hythe Road, Willesden Junction, northwest London.

On 20 January 1937, the Lamson Engineering Company Ltd was incorporated as a merger of the Lamson Store Service Co Ltd and Lamson Pneumatic Tube Co Ltd.

In 1973, the firm was promoting its "Rallypost" system with PVC track and battery-operated carriers that could carry up to 6 kg. This was designed as an office document carrier.

Lamson bought a 51% stake in the Dart Cash Carrier Company in 1927 and became sole owner in 1948. Dart was based in Stoke-on-Trent, and Lamson relocated to new premises in Stoke in 1974.

Lamson Engineering Company Ltd survived until 1976, when it was taken over by Dialed Despatches to become D. D. Lamson. Further acquisitions and sales moved the pneumatic tube business through Crest Nicholson, Frederick Cooper, J. Bibby and Sons and now it is part of Quirepace.
