= Up-To-Date Store =

Up-To-Date Store and Garth Jones Collection of farm machinery
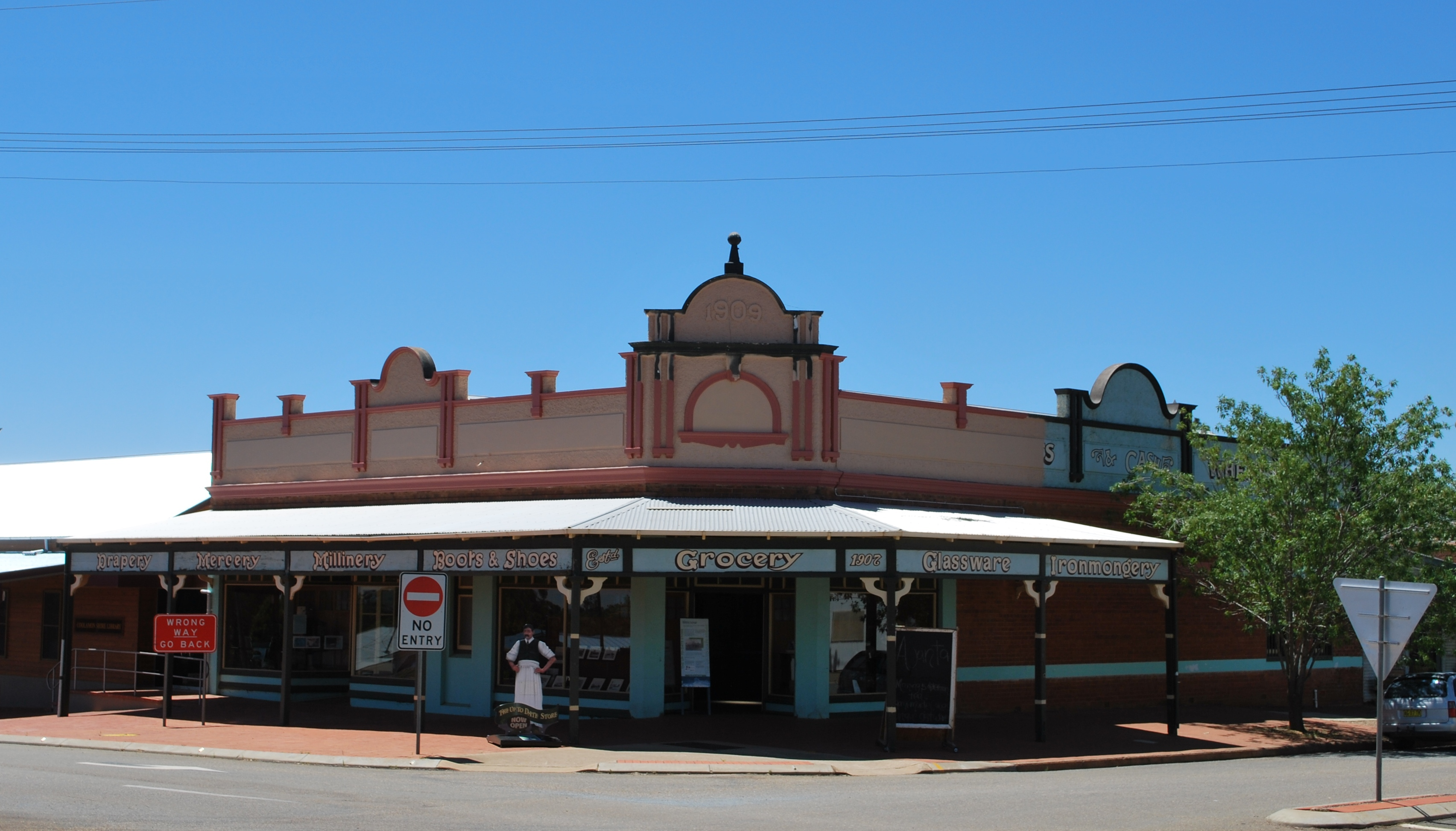

- Location within New South Wales Location within Australia
- 34.8130°S 147.1999°E
- Location: 127-129 Cowabbie Street, Coolamon, Coolamon Shire, New South Wales, Australia

History
- Built: 1909–1909

Site notes
- Architect: William John Monks
- Owner: Coolamon Shire Council

New South Wales Heritage Register
- Official name: Up-To-Date Store and Garth Jones Collection of farm machinery; Up To Date Store
- Type: state heritage (built)
- Designated: 13 October 2006
- Reference no.: 1761
- Type: Shop
- Category: Retail and Wholesale
- Builders: George Henry Mutch

The Up-To-Date Store is a heritage-listed former retail building and now museum at 127-129 Cowabbie Street, Coolamon, Coolamon Shire, New South Wales, Australia. It includes the Garth Jones Collection of Farm Machinery. The store was designed by William John Monks and built in 1909 by George Henry Mutch. The property is owned by Coolamon Shire Council. It was added to the New South Wales State Heritage Register on 13 October 2006. The store operated from 1909 to 1932, supplying farmers with equipment and domestic goods. The Garth Jones Collection features agricultural equipment and is considered one of the finest of its kind in New South Wales.

== History ==
The history of the Up To Date Store is tied to the development of the township of Coolamon and the wheat industry of the surrounding district. Much of the store's business during its period of operation from 1909 to 1932 was supplying farmers with equipment and domestic goods and purchasing wheat and other local farm produce. The health of the rural economy of the district accounted for the success of the store. It closed in 1932, the worst year of the 1929-1935 depression.

The genesis of Coolamon township (gazetted on 3 October 1881) lay in the construction of the Junee-Narrandera railway (Hay railway line), completed that year, that opened up the south-western districts of NSW to wheat growing. Coolamon began life as "Cowabbie" siding (on the road to Cowabbie Station). The township, laid out where the Wyalong Road crossed the railway line, was on the boundaries of the Kittegora, Coolamon Holes and Kindra Creek runs. In the township's early years the railway station serviced a thriving timber industry but the primary catalyst for Coolamon's growth was the development of the wheat industry. Wheat dominated the agriculture of the Coolamon district and there was markedly increased wheat production (due to genetic advances in wheat-breeding and superphosphate use) in the period between the end of the crippling drought of 1895-1903 and World War I. In 1905 over 100,000 bags of wheat were despatched from Coolamon railway station. Coolamon's population trebled in two decades, reaching around 600 by 1906. The main street (Cowabbie Street) was on the stock route to Wagga Wagga and its 60.3 m width was designed to accommodate the wheat wagons. Coolamon's stores, hotels and offices lined Cowabbie Street on both sides, leading up the hill from the railway station. Building renewal was frequent, following major fires in 1912 and 1918.

The land on which the Up To Date Store is located, at the corner of Cowabbie and Loughnan Streets, was bought by Nicholas Mutton in 1908 and remained in Mutton family ownership until 1987. It was bought by Coolamon Shire Council in 1998. None of the store operators during the life of the store (1909–32) owned the property but operated their businesses there on lease. The history of the Up To Date Store demonstrates the interconnection of retail interests within Coolamon and with the neighbouring town of Ganmain.

A store has existed on the Up To Date store site from 1883. By 1893 it was a weatherboard building facing Cowabbie Street run by Frederick Hall that was referred to as the Up To Date Store in advertisements and newspaper reports, thought it did not display this name on its facade. The term "up to date" was a very common commercial descriptor of goods and services at the time.

Hall's store was taken over in September 1907 by Harold Charles Nadin (manager of Hall's drapery department until 1906 then briefly a partner in the general store at 104 Cowabbie Street), F. Alcock (newly arrived in Coolamon) and William Denoon (Hall's former 'confidential secretary').

The Up-To-Date Store land and property was bought by Nicholas Mutton on 23 May 1908. Mutton entered into a new lease with Nadin, Alcock and Denoon (a lease that he continued to renew with subsequent owners until the store ceased operation) (from annotations on the deeds).

Nicholas Mutton was most likely the instigator of the construction of the new Up-To-Date Store, presumably in liaison with the storekeepers. This proposal was presumably stimulated by the construction of an impressive two-storey brick store by Ashwood Brothers in Cowabbie Street in 1907, which replaced their old timber store. Ashwood Bros was the main competition for the Up-To-Date Store, and Hall's old premises were no match for the smart new Ashwood's emporium. Hence, perhaps, the emphasis on the increased use of the "Up-To-Date" tag for the store and its advertisements, and the introduction of modern conveniences such as the Lamson Cash Carrier.

The Ashwood store, which still outshone even the new Up-To-Date Store as a streetscape edifice, did not long remain a competitor for customer attention as it was burnt down (together with several other stores) in May 1912. Ashwoods moved into an existing timber store (formerly the D. Benjamin and Co. 'Railway Stores') lower down the hill, which was old and much smaller. This in turn was destroyed by fire in 1918 and a new store was built on the site of the original 1907 store. Though larger, this was closer in scale to the Up-To-Date Store and was eventually occupied by W.A. Iverach when he vacated the Up-To-Date Store in 1932.

Nicholas Mutton (1872–1949), the owner of the Up-To-Date Store, was born in Truro, Cornwall, where his father was a butcher. He migrated to Australia in 1893 to join his uncle, Tom Lockett, as co-owner of his butchery at Coolamon. Mutton subsequently sold the butchery to become a stock dealer and from 1910 or 1912 started dealing in hay and chaff, establishing a chaff cutting plant in Coolamon. Mutton foresaw the likely drought of 1920, and bought up large amounts of hay, making substantial profits on its resale the following year. He was involved in several notorious dealings, one in 1914 leading to a Royal Commission to investigate alleged (but unproven) bribery of government officials, and another in 1936 when he lost substantial amounts of money as victim of a European land speculation fraud. Mutton's business operations were taken over by his sons Oswald and Nicholas in 1936.

Work on the foundation trenches for the new Up To Date Store was reported underway in January 1909; the contractor, G. H. Mutch was 'pushing ahead with the erection of Messrs Nadin, Alcock and Denoon's new store' in March; and by the end of July 1909 the new "owners" were "comfortably settled in their fine new store", Alcock's share having been acquired by W.A. Iverach several weeks earlier.

The new building is built of load-bearing brick and is clearly not a simple facading of the earlier building. It is highly likely that the bricks used in the construction of the new store were produced locally. Ashwood Brothers had four brick kilns operating in Coolamon in 1908, with orders in hand for 600,000 bricks.

William John Monks, the architect of the new store, had one of the most successful and extensive architectural practices in country NSW. He was based in Wagga for over 40 years and designed buildings in practically every district in the southern half of the state. In the 1930s he was one of a team of architects employed by the brewery company, Tooth and Co. Buildings designed by Monks include: Lewisham Hospital in Sydney; Wagga Base Hospital; St Michael's Cathedral, Wagga; Public Hall, Ganmain; the Ganmain Hotel, Ganmain (destroyed by fire 1930, taking the former Nadin, Iverach and Wilson Ganmain store with it) and Meaker's Store, Ganmain.

The builder George Henry Mutch, who operated the "Central Timber Yards" in Junee, died in Junee in 1938.

The sign-writing came in for special mention in the local paper:

'Mr LB. Drane, signwriter, had given plenty of proof of his ability in both Coolamon and Ganmain. Messrs Nadin, Iverach and Denoon's new Up- To-Date Store had been finished in splendid style, as was Kelly and Ryan's Office window in Ganmain'.

Nadin, Iverach and Denoon, 1909-1912

William Alfred Iverach (1879–1946) started work in Hall's store in 1896 as a "potato boy" weighing potatoes, rising to become manager of the hardware and grocery departments before leaving in 1906 to go into partnership with Nadin in a new store at 104 Cowabbie Street (which still stands) . He bought Nadin's share in 1907, and then sold this store to Sykes and Watson in 1909. Iverach then immediately rejoined his former partner, Nadin, when he bought Alcock's share in the Up To Date Store, Iverach's name first appearing in advertisements in the paper on 4 June 1909. Alcock left Coolamon in July and Iverach, Nadin and Denoon moved into the newly completed store in the same month. The new Up To Date Store was glowingly reported in the Coolamon-Ganmain Farmers Review on 30 July 1909:

'Nadin, Iverach and Denoon are now comfortably settled in their fine new store. The building is certainly true to its well known name, viz. "Up-to- date". The architect, Mr Monks, of Wagga, has given further proof of his ability to do good, creditable, all round work. The interior is replete with modem appliances on every side to suit the conveniences necessary to run a large and growing business. The exterior presents an appearance at once pleasing to the eye, and visitors to the town never fail to pass unstinted praise when viewing its pretentious dimensions. The four large windows allow of a fine display of stock to be made, and reflect a good deal of credit to those who took in hand the difficult task of dressing them. It would be almost impossible to enumerate the whole of the departments from memory, but extensive stocks of drapery, millinery, clothing, ironmongery, grocery, and saddlery are carried and neatly shelved. A large store room at the back of the premises was specially built to hold the goods in bulk and must provide a great amount of convenience to customers as well as to the proprietors. The contractor, Mr G. H. Mutch, of Junee, comes in for some well merited encomium owing to the faithful manner in which he completed his heavy and costly undertaking, and he must continue to be reckoned with whilst able to give such thorough satisfaction. In conclusion, let us wish Messrs Nadin, Iverach and Denoon a full measure of success and prosperity, and that they and Mr N. Mutton will be able to look back with pride to the day upon which the contract for the new premises was let.'

Several photographs of the store from 1909 to 1912 show the ornate facade, the gable dated 1909, and the names "Nadin, Iverach and Denoon" on both the gable end and on the corner billboard above the verandah.

William Alfred Iverach (usually simply known as 'W.A.'), was the part or sole operator of the present Up To Date Store from its construction in 1909 until its closure in 1932. He emigrated from Scotland with his family, arriving in Coolamon in 1889 and was in business initially as a blacksmith. By 1897 he was a committee member of the Coolamon Ploughing Match Committee, becoming President of the Committee in 1902. He remained in that position until at least 1907, and possibly until the last ploughing match was held in 1908.

Nadin, Iverach and Wilson, 1912-1914

William Denoon left Coolamon in 1911, and his share in the business was acquired by Hugh Charles Wilson. In what appears to have been a reciprocal deal, Nadin and Iverach acquired George Ashelford's share in Ashelford and Wilson's general store in Ganmain, which had been established in 1909. The Ganmain store consequently also traded as "Nadin, Iverach and Wilson".

William Denoon left the firm to enter into partnership with Mr C. Murnane in a patent horseshoe-making business in Sydney. Frederick Hall said of Denoon at his farewell reception that his former confidential secretary: "had a character which was to be envied", and was active in a number of community activities and institutions. He seems to have served overseas in the First World War, then apparently returned to Coolamon. A photograph, dated to 1925, shows a shop hoarding in Cowabbie Street for "W. Denoon, Auctioneer".

Nadin and Iverach, 1914-1925

Wilson sold his share in the Up To Date Store to Nadin and Iverach in 1914, and bought the Ganmain store outright. He sold the Ganmain store operation (but not the land) to Alan Gilbert in 1924, and the store was burnt down in the 1930 Ganmain Hotel fire (see photos in Gilmore 1992: 49, 73).

Nadin and Iverach became the agents for H. V. McKay Sunshine in 1917, and Iverach retained the dealership of the subsequent H.V. McKay Massey Harris Company created in 1930 until at least the 1950s. In 1933 alone, Iverach delivered 33 headers in the Coolamon district. At some point, as yet unknown, Nadin seems to have moved to Sydney, probably becoming a supplier to the Coolamon store.

W.A. Iverach, 1925-1932

In 1925 Iverach bought out Nadin (possibly on Nadin's death?), and continued to operate as "W.A. Iverach". In January 1933 W. A. Iverach moved his store to the former Ashwood and Coles store located at 113 - 115 Cowabbie St. Ashwood and Cole had gone into liquidation in the previous year (presumably in the depression) and Iverach purchased the store. He advertised a "removal price cutting" sale at the Up To Date Store in December 1932, indicating to customers that there were "hundreds of GENUINE BARGAINS" to be had. On 6 January 1933 it was reported that: "Mr W.A. Iverach closed, with the closing of the Old Year, his Up To Date store, opening for business on Tuesday his New Quality store, lately occupied by Ashwood and Cole. The interior of the premises had been thoroughly cleaned and renovated, and the exterior is being painted and decorated".

In 1936 W.A. Iverach took his sons Everard, Horace William (1905–1981) and Ormond Charles (1909–1979) into the firm, becoming W.A. Iverach and Sons. The firm became a limited liability company in 1947, following W.A.'s death in 1946. (CGFR 24/8/1956; Kingdon 1956; Coolamon and District Cemeteries).

The Up To Date Store after 1932

The Mutton family, owners of the store, operated agricultural businesses and ran a stock and station agency and chaff mill in town. When the Up To Date Store closed in 1932 they used the building for storage: chaff, grain, fencing materials and machinery (oral information, Ellie Lucas and Knocky Moore). The Muttons demolished the weatherboard extension at the back of the store, and replaced it with the present corrugated iron extension. They also removed the original stables located at the northern end of the block, and replaced them with a pole-framed corrugated iron work shed which contained a forge, used for repairing machinery.

The store had other intermittent uses that included roller skating, (probably in the 1940s in Room 2 with the counters pulled back against the shelving) as a fruit shop and for boxing (though possibly this was a youth activity rather than a spectator sport).

In 1998, the original timber work and storage shed fronting Cowabbie Street was demolished, and the new north-western shed built (steel-framed and iron), set back from Cowabbie Street with a garden in front.

In 2018, the building continues to operate as a museum and also houses the Coolamon Library.

Comparison with similar stores using Webber, Hoskins and McCann's studies indicates that the Up To Date Store is significant at the state level.

The Garth Jones Collection of farm machinery is fully documented and mostly provenanced to the Coolamon area and the family properties of Garth Jones. There is extensive supporting documentation and historic photographs of the properties and family life on the farm. Garth Jones's commentary provides a personal and insightful narrative to the collection, telling stories about working on the land. The contents of the Garth Jones Collection have been catalogued. A copy of the catalogue will be retained on file at the Heritage Office at H04/00016.

== Description ==
The Up To Date Store site includes the main store building with skillion roofed extension, and sheds to the north and north-west. The east and part of the south boundary is formed by a modern corrugated iron fence which encloses the rear service yard. The Garth Jones Collection of farm machinery (housed in the north and north-western sheds) represents one of the finest collections of its kind in New South Wales.

=== Store building ===
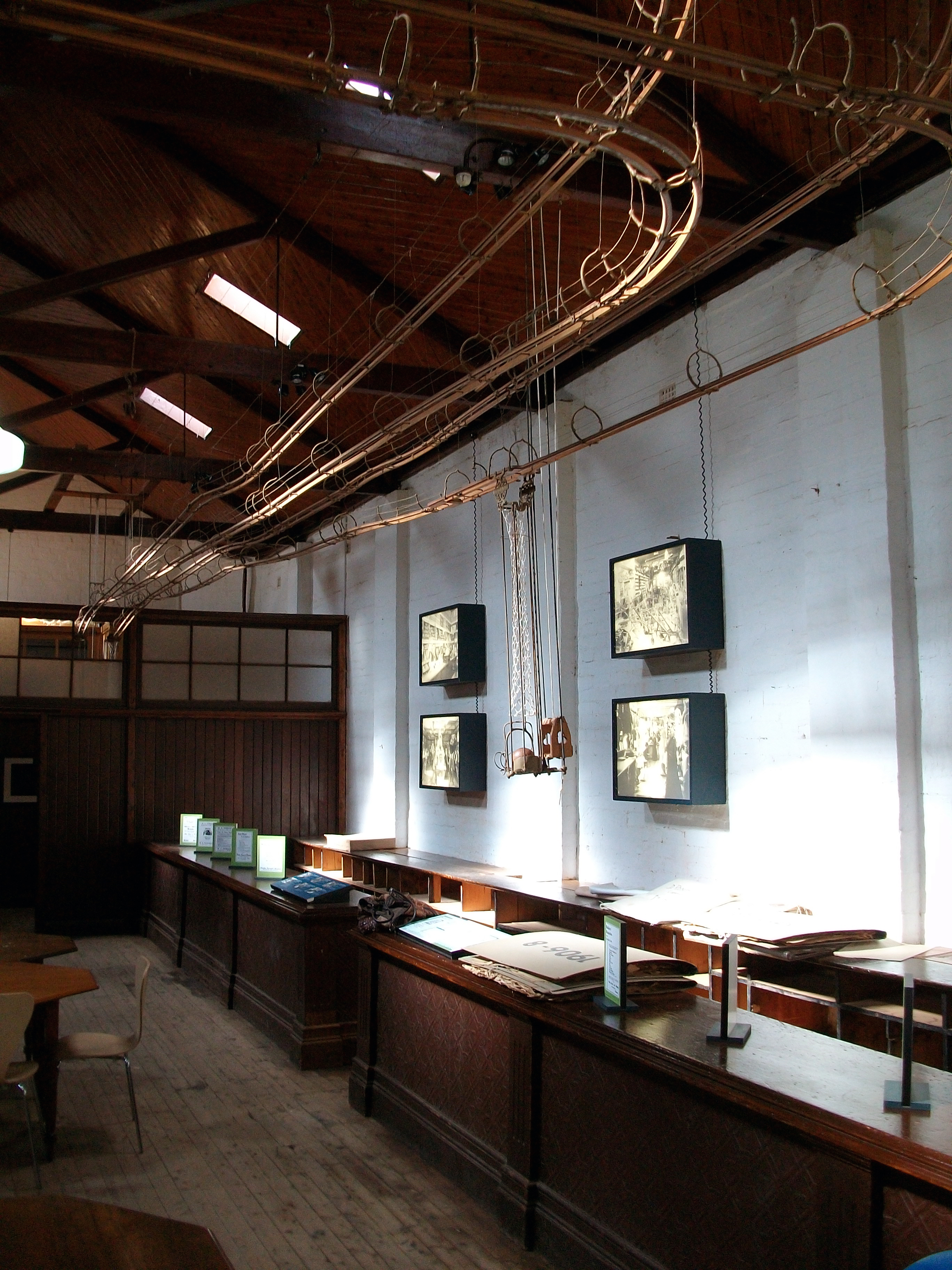
Store interior, 2010

The store is sited on the corner of Cowabbie and Loughnan Streets, Coolamon. It has two main facades addressing the street frontages with a wide, timber-framed and corrugated iron-roofed wrap-around verandah. The store is constructed of brick with a timber framed roof sheeted with corrugated iron, timber doors and windows.

The parapet features a rendered cornice, stucco finish above the cornice and a rendered moulding at the top of the parapet. Within the parapet are smooth rendered panels for signage. The parapet includes short vertical projections at intervals along its length, and the central section is formed into a curvilinear pediment. The easternmost vertical projection is also a chimney.

At the corner, the store is chamfered in plan with the corner entrance doors and above which is the focal feature of the parapet. This feature is styled similar to the southern elevation parapet but has a more prominent pediment rising to a small obelisk. The body of this section of the parapet has a blind arch element which is smooth rendered inside for signage. The date "1909" surmounts this.

The Store Building is an example of the Federation Free Style (the style dates from about 1890 until about 1915) and displays the following key features: prominent skyline feature, (especially the corner parapet element) and strongly contrasting materials, textures or colours, (such as the brickwork and rendered bands and parapet). Other features of the style displayed by the building include: projecting corner tower feature, (though in this case it is a corner projection of the parapet rather than a three dimensional feature); curvilinear parapet features; circular recess in the corner parapet element, and Art Nouveau motif in the verandah post brackets.

The store's interior has two large main spaces with three minor partitioned rooms and a short corridor at the rear of the building. The interior brick walls are painted and there are timber internal walls. The floor is timber as are the counters, benches and shelves. Rooms 1 and 2 originally had mirror fit outs. Room 1 contains its original counters and benches and most of its shelving (though not in their original locations). Room 2 contain one of its original four counters and many of its benches and shelving.

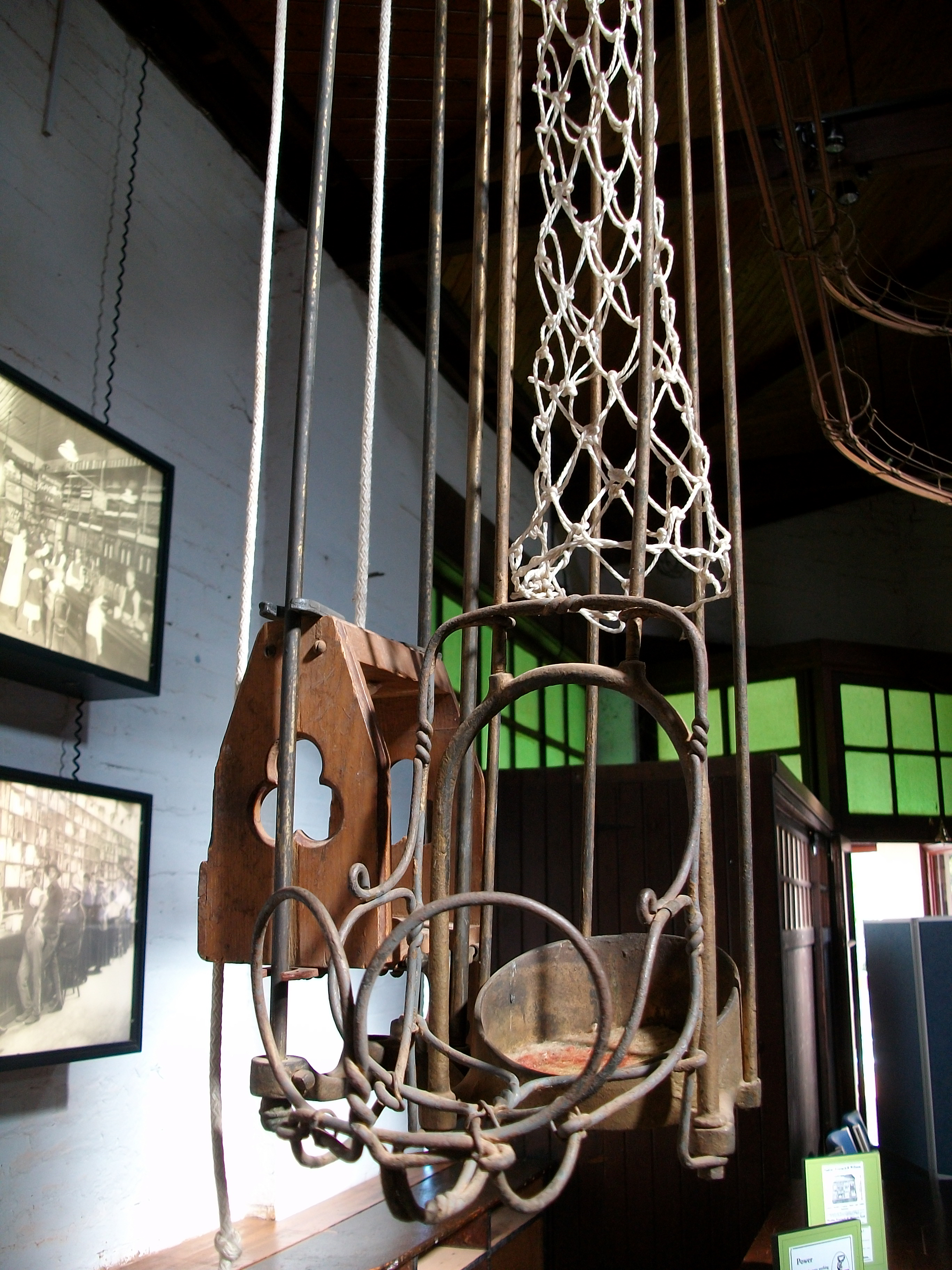
Lamson cash ball system at the Up-To-Date Store, 2010

The store features the substantial surviving components of a Lamson Cash Carrier system that was gravity-operated with hollow wooden balls rolling down an inclined track. The system allowed money to be collected at four counters inside the store which would then be sent to an office for safekeeping and where, if necessary, change would be issued and sent back to the counter staff for delivery to a customer. The system operated between Rooms 1 and 2, (where sales would have been made at the counters), and Room 5 (where money would have been collected and change provided). The system is not operational, but could easily be made so. There are four pairs of tracks. All of the track system survives in Room 1 and about half in Room 2. Only one (of the original two) delivery/loading mechanisms is in place in each of Rooms 1 and 2. Room 1 contains a second disassembled delivery/loading mechanism. Room 5 contains intact delivery/loading mechanisms for all four tracks. Council holds several timber balls.

The north shed (that replaced the original stables after 1932) has early, possible original, components as well as later repairs and alterations. It contains an early blacksmith's forge. The north-western shed was built in 1998 and replaced an original timber and iron shed located in the present garden area.

=== Garth Jones Collection: North and North-Western Sheds ===
The Garth Jones collection includes agricultural equipment, wagons, sulkies, fences, gates, an improvised wooden trough, plough, wheat pickler, wind mill, water cart, horse and bullock harnesses and other tools. The two wagons are highlights of the collection, being in exceptional condition. They were always kept in the shed and have retained most of their original paintwork. The collection is rare for its largely original condition, its fully documented provenance and its cohesiveness, being mostly sourced from the Coolamon area and the family properties of Garth Jones. The collection demonstrates important themes in the agricultural history of the district, such as water, land clearing, horse power, wheat, fencing and transport. Garth Jones's commentary provides a personal and insightful narrative to the collection, telling stories about working on the land. There is extensive supporting documentation and historic photographs of the properties and family life on the farm. The collection demonstrates the kind of farming enterprise the store serviced in the district.

The contents of the Garth Jones Collection have been catalogued. A copy of the catalogue is retained on file at the Heritage Office at H04/00016.

== Heritage listing ==
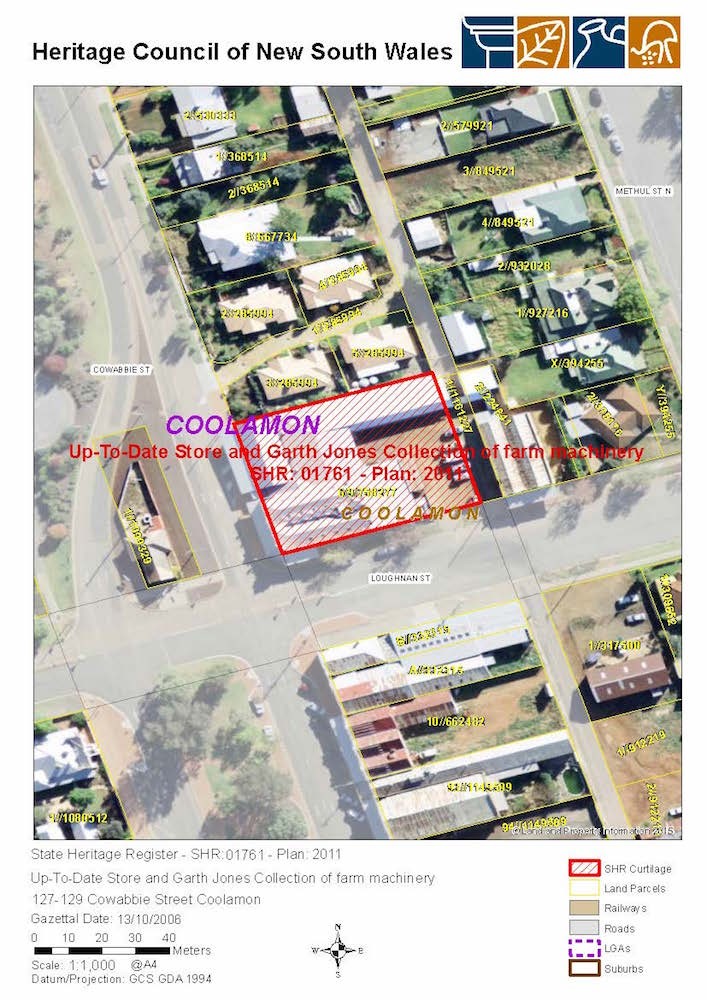
Heritage boundaries

The Up To Date Store, an excellent example of a middle-sized country general store of the early twentieth century, is of state significance. It is in an exceptionally intact state for a store fitted out in 1909 despite the loss of some elements of the internal fit out. Associated with the store, and also of state significance, is the Garth Jones Collection of farm machinery which is one of the finest collections of its type in New South Wales.

The surviving shop fittings such as counters, benches and shelving; the open spaces of the two main rooms in the store; the intact partitioning creating smaller rooms at the rear of the store; the exposed roof trusses and varnished ceiling boards; the window show cases; the original timber floor with its evidence of wear patterns, and the verandahs on Cowabbie and Loughnan Streets are all integral elements contributing to this value. The store is significant for the legibility of its various spaces and rooms which highlights the different aspects of the retail business of a country general store, the comprehensive nature of the services it provided, and the society of the period. One element of the store's fit out, the Lamson Cash Carrier, is a rare surviving example of this early cash management system. It is unique in New South Wales in that it is still in its original location.

The rear skillion extension, the north shed (built after 1932 to replace the original stables) and the yard area are significant in continuing the spatial arrangement of the site that has existed since at least 1909.

The Garth Jones Collection of farm machinery (housed in the north and north-western sheds), represents one of the finest collections of its kind in New South Wales. The location of this collection on the site of the Up To Date Store reinforces the historic connection between the Up To Date Store and the agricultural development of the district whereby the store itself, (and its owner Nicholas Mutton through his other enterprises), played an important role in supplying goods and equipment to the farmers of the district and purchasing the local produce. The collection is rare for its largely original condition, its fully documented provenance and its cohesiveness, being mostly sourced from the Coolamon area and the family properties of Garth Jones. The collection demonstrates important themes in the agricultural history of the district and aspects of rural life such as water, land clearing, horse power, wheat, fencing and transport. Garth Jones's commentary provides a personal and insightful narrative to the collection, telling stories about working on the land. After the store closed in 1932, its sheds were used for the repair of farm tools and machinery. An in situ forge in the north shed, together with items in the Garth Jones collection related to blacksmithing, interprets this work and draws connections between the Up To Date Store and the farming enterprise of the district it serviced.

Up-To-Date Store and Garth Jones Collection of farm machinery was listed on the New South Wales State Heritage Register on 13 October 2006 having satisfied the following criteria.

The place is important in demonstrating the course, or pattern, of cultural or natural history in New South Wales.

The Up To Date Store is significant at state level for its largely intact original fittings and for the Garth Jones Collection of farm machinery that it houses.

The Up To Date Store is an excellent example of a middle-sized country general store of the early twentieth century. It is in an exceptionally intact state for a store fitted out in 1909 despite the loss of some elements of the internal fit out. The surviving fittings such as counters, benches and shelving, the open spaces of the two main rooms in the store, the intact partitioning creating smaller rooms at the rear of the store, the exposed roof trusses and varnished ceiling boards, the window show cases, the original timber floor with its evidence of wear patterns, and the verandahs on Cowabbie and Loughnan Streets are all integral elements contributing to this value. The store is significant for the legibility of its various spaces and rooms which highlights the different aspects of the retail business of a country general store, the comprehensive nature of the services it provided, and the society of the period. One element of the store's fit out, the Lamson Cash Carrier, is a rare surviving example of this early cash management system. It is unique in New South Wales in that it is still in its original location.

The Up-To-Date Store has strong associations with the development of Coolamon township. The size, quality and scale of the store demonstrates confidence in the future of Coolamon as a centre of commerce and trade during the early twentieth century. The design of the large windows reflects the trend in shop design of this era. The use of the site as a store dates from 1883, just two years after the establishment of the town. The current store building replaced the original store in 1909 and operated continuously until 1932 when the business, now solely run by W.A Iverach, transferred to larger premises in the centre of the main street. The store was one of two or three major retail outlets in the town during most of this period.

The Garth Jones Collection of farm machinery, (housed in the north shed and the new north-western shed), represents one of the finest collections of its kind in New South Wales. The location of this collection on the site of the Up To Date Store reinforces the historic connection between the Up To Date Store and the agricultural development of the district whereby the store itself, (and its owner Nicholas Mutton through his other enterprises), played an important role in supplying goods and equipment to the farmers of the district and purchasing the local produce. The collection is rare for its largely original condition, its documented provenance and its cohesiveness, being mostly sourced from the Coolamon area and the family properties of Garth Jones. The collection demonstrates important themes in the agricultural history of the district and aspects of rural life such as water, land clearing, horse power, wheat, fencing and transport. Garth Jones's commentary provides a personal and insightful narrative to the collection, telling stories about working on the land. After the store closed in 1932, its sheds were used for the repair of farm tools and machinery. An in situ forge in the north shed, together with items in the Garth Jones collection related to blacksmithing, interprets this work and draws connections between the Up To Date Store and the farming enterprise of the district it serviced.

The place has a strong or special association with a person, or group of persons, of importance of cultural or natural history of New South Wales's history.

The Up To Date Store demonstrates local significance for its association with its architect and the group of individuals who owned and ran it.

The people involved with the store, including Frederick Hall, W.A. Iverach and the principal land owner Nicholas Mutton, have strong associations with the development of Coolamon township. They were prominent in both the physical building and the community development of Coolamon. They were intimately involved in town-based commercial activities, rural agricultural enterprise, and voluntary work within a number of community organisations. The store was a considerable employer within the town, having a staff estimated at ten people at any given time. The store is also an interesting surviving work of the prominent regional architect W.J. Monks.

The place is important in demonstrating aesthetic characteristics and/or a high degree of creative or technical achievement in New South Wales.

The Up To Date Store demonstrates local significance for its aesthetic values.

The Up To Date Store is located in a prominent position on a street corner at the top of the sloping main street. Because of its location and its architectural quality it makes a strong contribution to the Coolamon streetscape, which is one of considerable unity of scale and character and free of major modern infill buildings, except for the new (and relatively sympathetic) Royal Hotel, which replaced the original destroyed in the most recent of the town's fires.

The Up To Date Store acts as a final punctuation mark in the streetscape, particularly as it (alone among the Coolamon stores) addresses two streets (both Cowabbie and Loughnan Streets) by wrapping around the corner, and hence can be seen from a greater distance down the street than would be the case if it only addressed Cowabbie Street. While plantings form a strong element in the Cowabbie Street landscape south of Loughnan Street, plantings have never been associated with the Up To Date Store block, its commercial and then its workshop/storage functions being reflected in a treeless immediate landscape. This absence of trees and plantings (and any other form of formal landscaping) is characteristic of the place, and should be maintained.

The Up To Date Store is a good example of the Federation Free Style of architecture and is an important element in the Coolamon streetscape. This streetscape has a number of buildings with decorative facade treatments from the same and later periods (due to a number of major fires destroying earlier buildings). The streetscape's unity of scale and character is enhanced by the gentle slope down Cowabbie Street towards the railway, and the broad street with its central park.

The store is an interesting surviving work of the prominent regional architect William John Monks. The store building displays the following key features of the Federation Free Style: prominent skyline feature, (especially the corner parapet element) and strongly contrasting materials, textures or colours, (such as the brickwork and rendered bands and parapet). Other features of the style displayed by the building include: projecting corner tower feature, (though in this case it is a corner projection of the parapet rather than a three dimensional feature); curvilinear parapet features; circular recess in the corner parapet element, and Art Nouveau motif in the verandah post brackets.

The place has strong or special association with a particular community or cultural group in New South Wales for social, cultural or spiritual reasons.

The Up To Date Store has strong local significance for its association with the community of the Coolamon district. The store appears to have an established place in the communal memory of Coolamon, both as a store and because of the characters (in particular W.A. Iverach) who were associated with it. This is somewhat unusual, bearing in mind that the building has not been a store for nearly 60 years. The interest of the Up-To-Date Store Committee and the Coolamon Heritage and Advancement Society (CHAS), the site's continued use and appreciation by groups involved in its conservation and use, and its purchase by Coolamon Shire Council in 1998, all reflect a considerable degree of social significance.

The place has potential to yield information that will contribute to an understanding of the cultural or natural history of New South Wales.

The Up-To-Date Store is significant at state level for its surviving contents, and the Garth Jones Collection of farm machinery. These both provide rare cohesive evidence of the role and operations of a country general store in the townscape, development, society and farming enterprise of a country town in New South Wales during the early twentieth century.

The place possesses uncommon, rare or endangered aspects of the cultural or natural history of New South Wales.

While some of the elements of the internal fit out have been lost, on balance the Up To Date Store can be said to be in an exceptionally intact state for a store fitted out in 1909.

The Lamson Cash Carrier is very rare, there being only two other examples of the early ball system as yet reported in Australia. One of these is a section only on display in a NSW museum, and the other is in pieces in store in Qld. The Up To Date Store's model is unique in remaining largely intact and in its original position. Enquiries to the Smithsonian Institution in the USA indicate that the ball model is not known to the specialists there, even though they have been undertaking research in connection with the company and their "flying fox" style cash carriers. Photographic evidence indicates that the ball cash carrier system was installed in other prominent stores in Sydney at least and may have been quite widespread. The Up To Date Store has the only known surviving example in Australia that is still in its original location.

The Garth Jones Collection of farm machinery (housed in the north and north-western sheds) is rare as one of the finest collections of its kind in New South Wales. It is rare for its largely original condition, its fully documented provenance and its cohesiveness, being mostly sourced from the Coolamon area and the family properties of Garth Jones.

The place is important in demonstrating the principal characteristics of a class of cultural or natural places/environments in New South Wales.

The Up-To-Date Store is an excellent example of a middle-sized country general store of the early twentieth century, which has survived largely intact, including its surviving original furnishings and fittings.

The Garth Jones Collection of farm machinery, housed in the north and north-western sheds, represents one of the finest collections of its kind in New South Wales.
