= Kennedy Shield =

Australian rugby league competition

- Sport: Rugby league
- Instituted: 1970s
- Ceased: 1990s
- Number of teams: 10 (over its existence)
- Country: Australia

The Kennedy Shield was a second-division rugby league competition centred around the city of Wagga Wagga in the Australian state of New South Wales. Playing in roughly the same geographical area as the Group 9 Rugby League, the competition featured many smaller towns, some of which were currently or had previously competed in group-level football, while also containing clubs from suburban Wagga Wagga.

== Teams ==
Throughout the competition's existence, ten teams took part in various seasons.

Club	Town	Home Ground	Moved to:
Ashmont	Wagga Wagga	Bolton Park	Folded
Astor Cellars	Wagga Wagga	Bolton Park	Folded
Broadway Broncos	Junee	Willow Park	Folded
Coolamon Raiders	Coolamon	Kindra Park	Folded (now in Group 9 Juniors)
Cootamundra Roosters	Cootamundra	Fisher Park	Folded
Forest Hill Panthers	Wagga Wagga	Bolton Park	Folded
Holbrook Warriors	Holbrook	Holbrook Rugby Ground	Folded
Imperial Dragons	Wagga Wagga	Bolton Park	Folded
Kooringal Tigers	Wagga Wagga	Bolton Park	Folded
Temora Beagle Boys	Temora	Nixon Park	Folded

In 1994, a women's team was assembled to play a Canberra team before the Grand Final of the men's competition.

== Proposed competition ==
Club	Town	Home Ground	Notes
Coolamon Raiders	Coolamon	Kindra Park	Play in Group 9 Juniors
Lockhart	Lockhart	Lockhart Sportsground	
Holbrook Warriors	Holbrook	Holbrook Rugby Ground	
Tarcutta	Tarcutta	Tarcutta Reserve	

== See also ==
- Group 9 Rugby League
- Group 13 Rugby League
- Farrer Football League
