= William Monks =

Australian architect (1869–1943)

William Monks – Architect
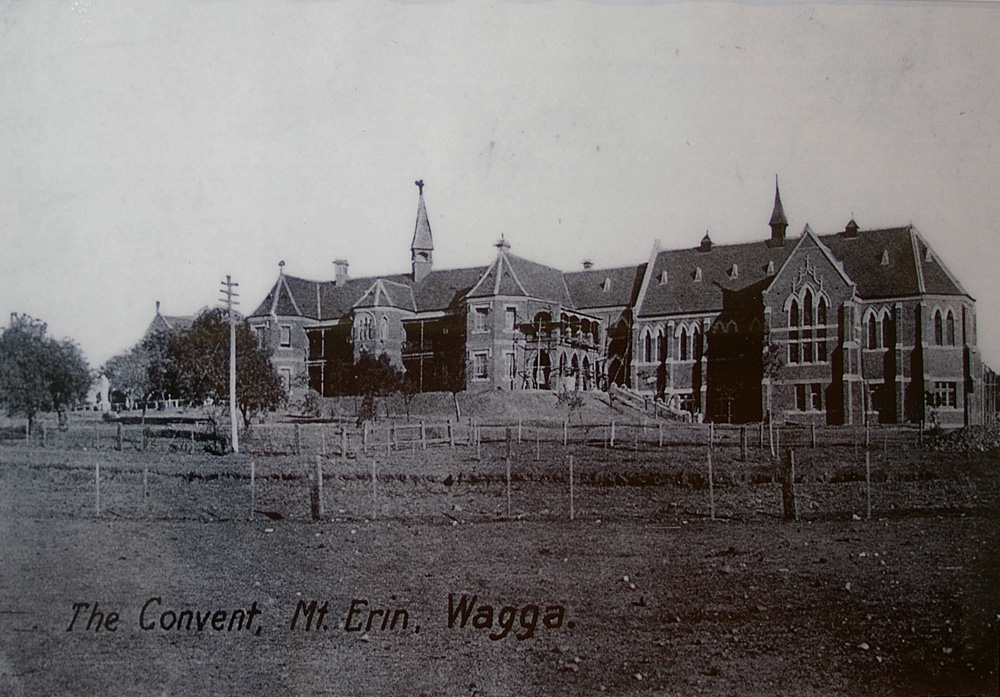
- Mt. Erin Convent and Chapel
- Born: 1869; Wagga Wagga, NSW
- Died: 2 July 1943 (aged 73); Melbourne, NSW
- Occupation: Architect
- Practice: W. J. Monks; Monks, Jeffs and Shaw; W. J. Monks and Jeffs
- Buildings: Extensions to St John's Church, Wagga, including the addition of two aisles, narthex, clergy vestry and belltower (1912); Completion of St Michael's Cathedral, Wagga (1922)
- Projects: Company Office Building for the Murrumbidgee Flour Mill (1890s); J. J. McGrath's saddlery, Fitzmaurice Street Wagga (1893); Hogan's Brewery, The Esplanade Wagga (1899); Mt Erin Boarding School (1892)Infants School Room (1901) and Chapel (1915); Wagga Wagga Base Hospital kitchen block and nurses quarters (1908–1909); Lewisham Hospital (1930)
- Design: Residences at 77 and 79 Johnston Street, Wagga; 53 and 95–97 Gurwood Street, Wagga; 16 The Esplanade, Wagga

William John Monks, also known as Bill or Billy, (1869 – 2 July 1943) was an Australian architect active in the last decade of the 19th century and first third of the 20th century. Monks "had one of the most successful and extensive architectural practices in country New South Wales. He was based in Wagga Wagga for over 40 years and designed buildings in practically every district in the southern half of the state."

== Family and early life ==
Born in Wagga Wagga, New South Wales, Monks was the eldest child of Alfred James and Ellen Bowe Monks. He lived until his teenage years in the Pastoral Hotel, Wagga, which was owned and managed by his publican father. Monks had two younger sisters, Bessie and Nell, and a younger brother, Alfred. Monks remained single throughout his life and maintained a close relationship with his sisters and brother.

== Education ==
Monks' early education was at Wagga Wagga Public School in Gurwood Street. At fourteen, he moved with his family to Petersham, a suburb in the Inner West of Sydney, and attended Newington College from 1883 to 1885. Late in 1885 he left school and was articled to the Sydney firm of architects Stockham and Hassall; in the ensuing five years he studied at Sydney Technical College. During this period the Faculty of Engineering at the University of Sydney held classes in architecture, and it is likely that Monks attended these with contemporaries such as Henry Budden.

== Architectural practice ==
Monks returned to Wagga in 1890 and opened an office in space provided by his father at the Pastoral Hotel. His domestic designs were in the Federation Bungalow style (asymmetrical, single storey, verandahs, detailed roof, exposed rafters, casement windows) with a strong national identity. By the turn of the century he had established a design office in Gurwood Street, Wagga. Later, Monks employed Christopher Ernest Jeffs as a draftsman. Jeffs eventually became a partner and for a while the partnership also included Roy Ashley Shaw and was known as Monks, Jeffs and Shaw. In 1938, Monks retired.

== Community involvement ==
In his younger years Monks played cricket and tennis locally but was not a strong sportsman. He was involved with the School of Arts and the Murrumbidgee Pastoral and Agricultural Association and enjoyed hunting, shooting and fishing.

== Heritage Branch listings ==
The following buildings are listed by the Heritage Council or by Local Councils, Shires and State Government Agencies.

- Up-To-Date Store, 127–129 Cowabbie Street, Coolamon, New South Wales
- Hairdresser (Junee Barber), 21 Seignior Street, Junee, New South Wales
- Home Care Service of NSW, 21 Seignior Street, Junee
- Junee Hotel, 21 Seignior Street, Junee
- Medical Centre, 34 Belmore Street, Junee
- Retail Shop, 21 Seignior Street, Junee
- St. Brendan's Roman Catholic Presbytery, 47 Langham Street, Ganmain, New South Wales
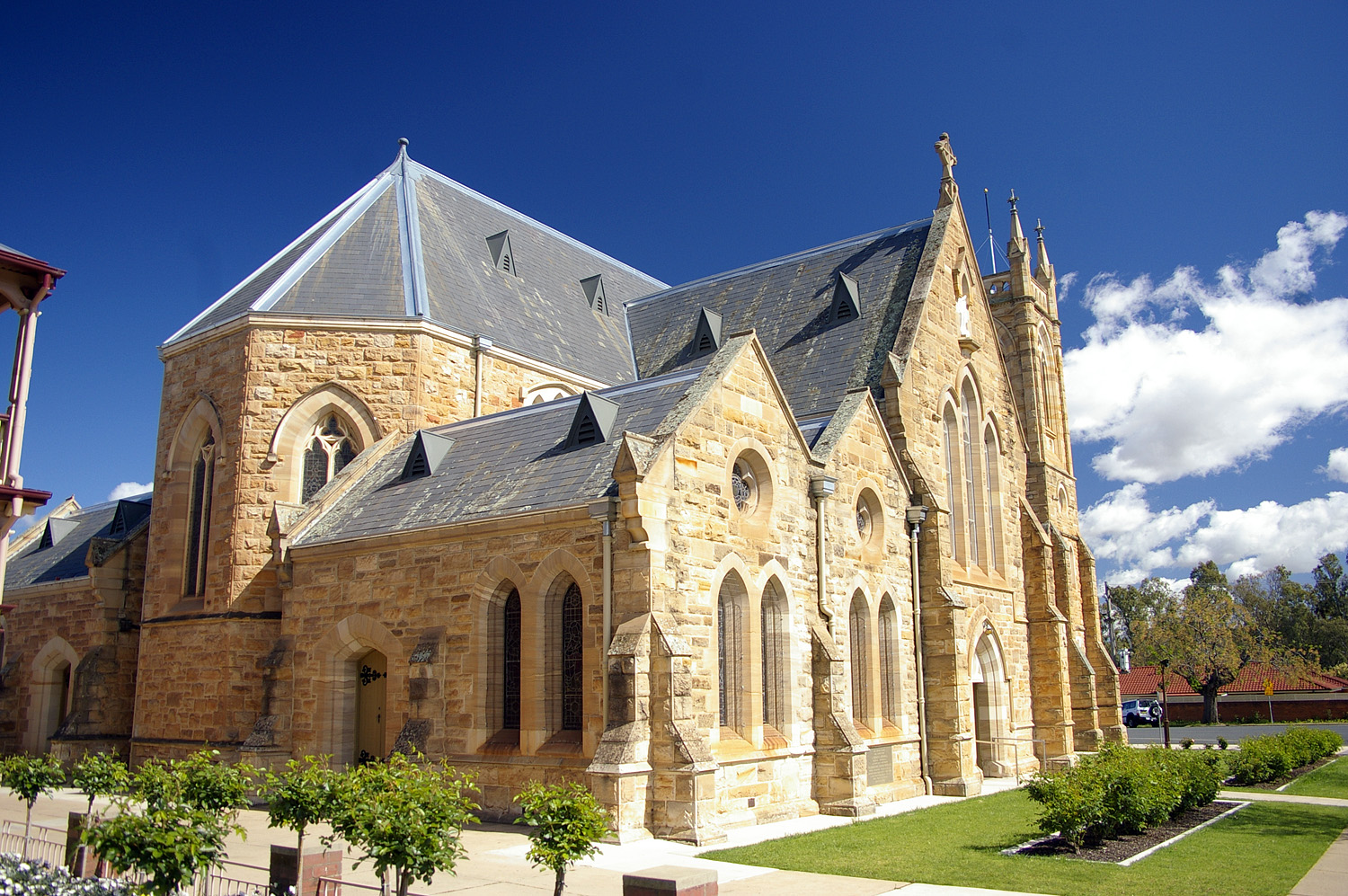
St Michael's Cathedral, Wagga Wagga
(completed by Monks in 1922)

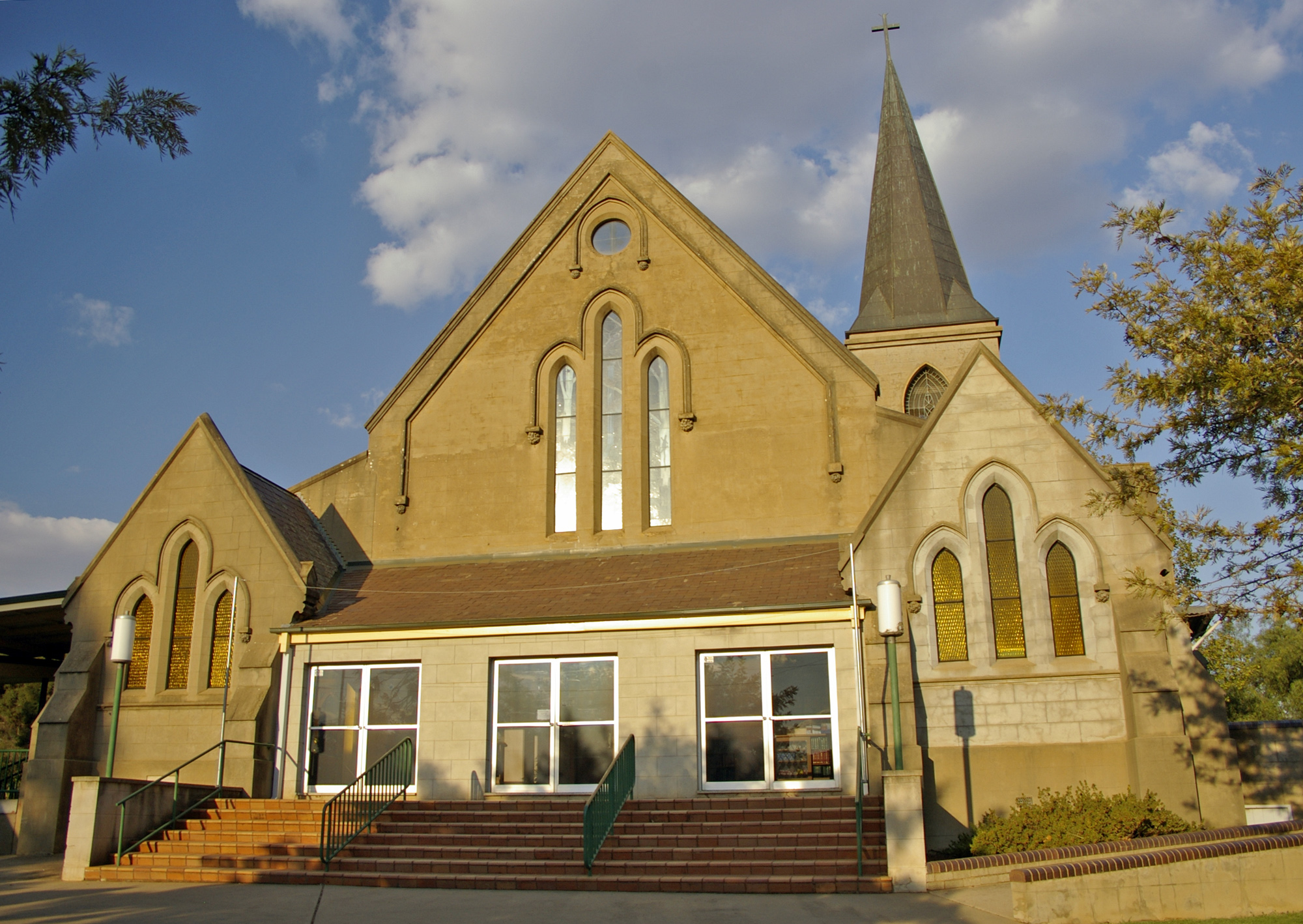
St John's Church, Wagga Wagga
(additions including belltower by Monks in 1912)

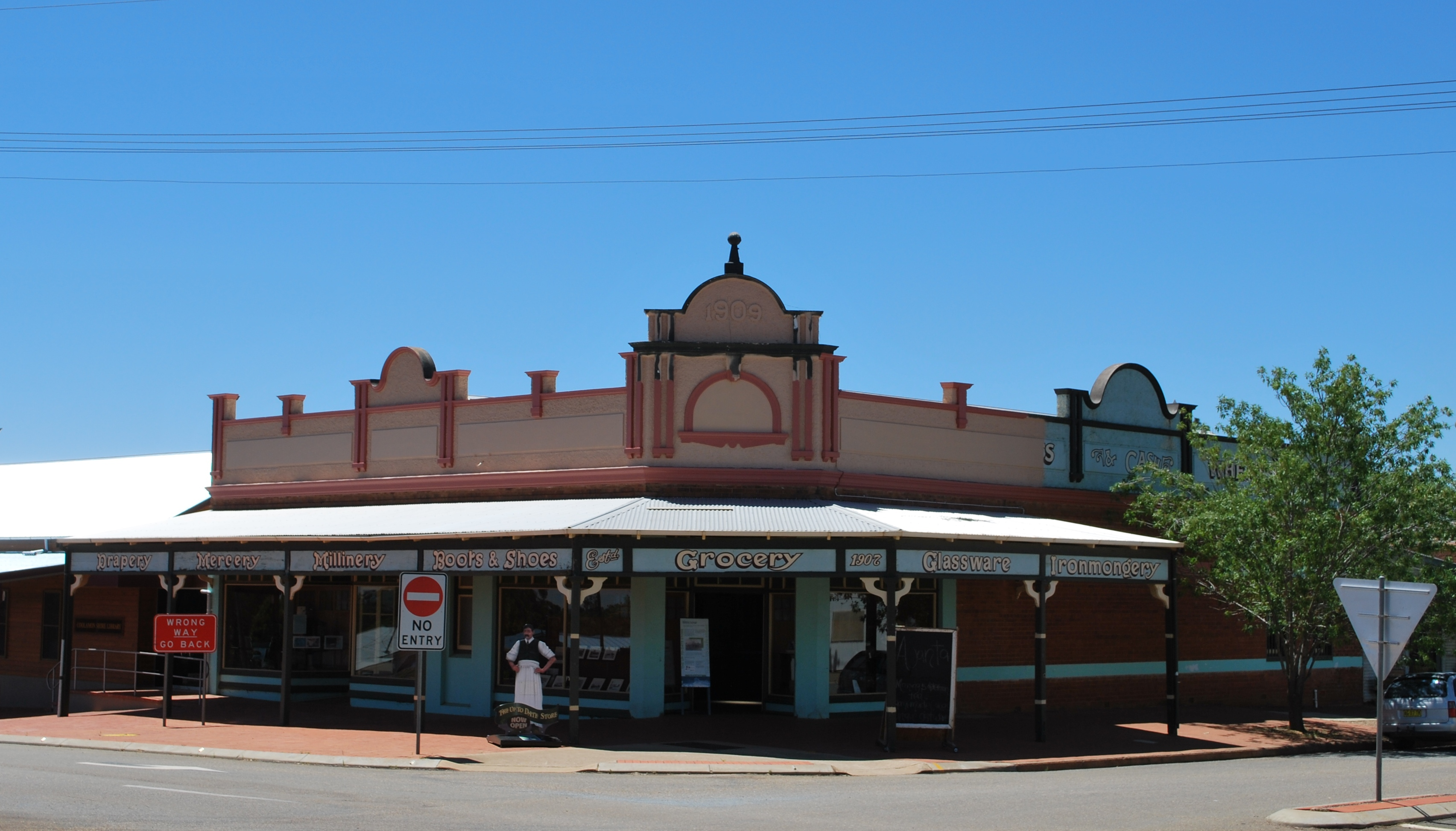
Up-To-Date Store
127-129 Cowabbie Street
Coolamon, New South Wales

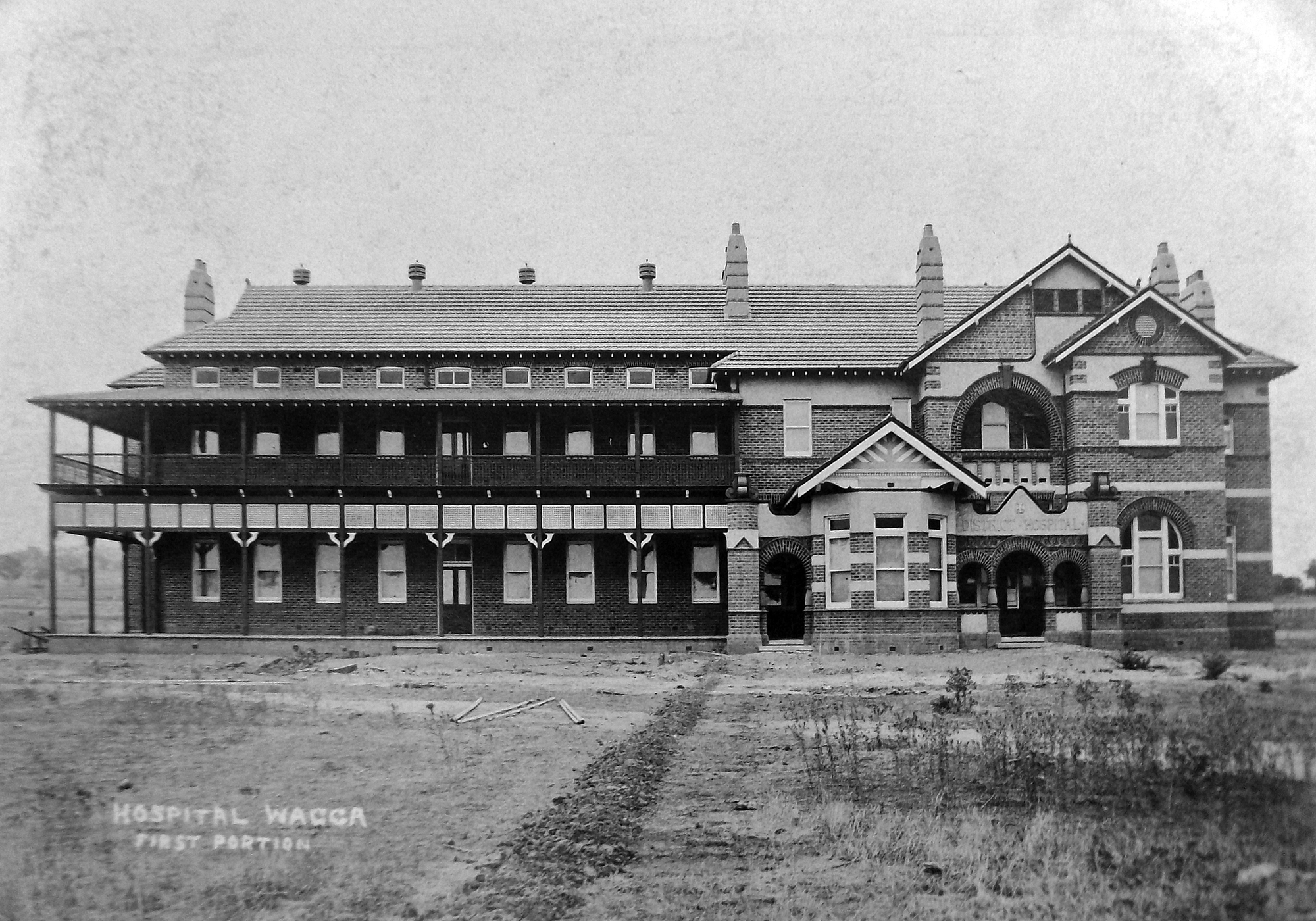
Wagga Wagga District Hospital
Nurses quarters and kitchens
(1908–1909)
