= Cash carrier =

Transport system used in shops to carry customers' payments to the cashier

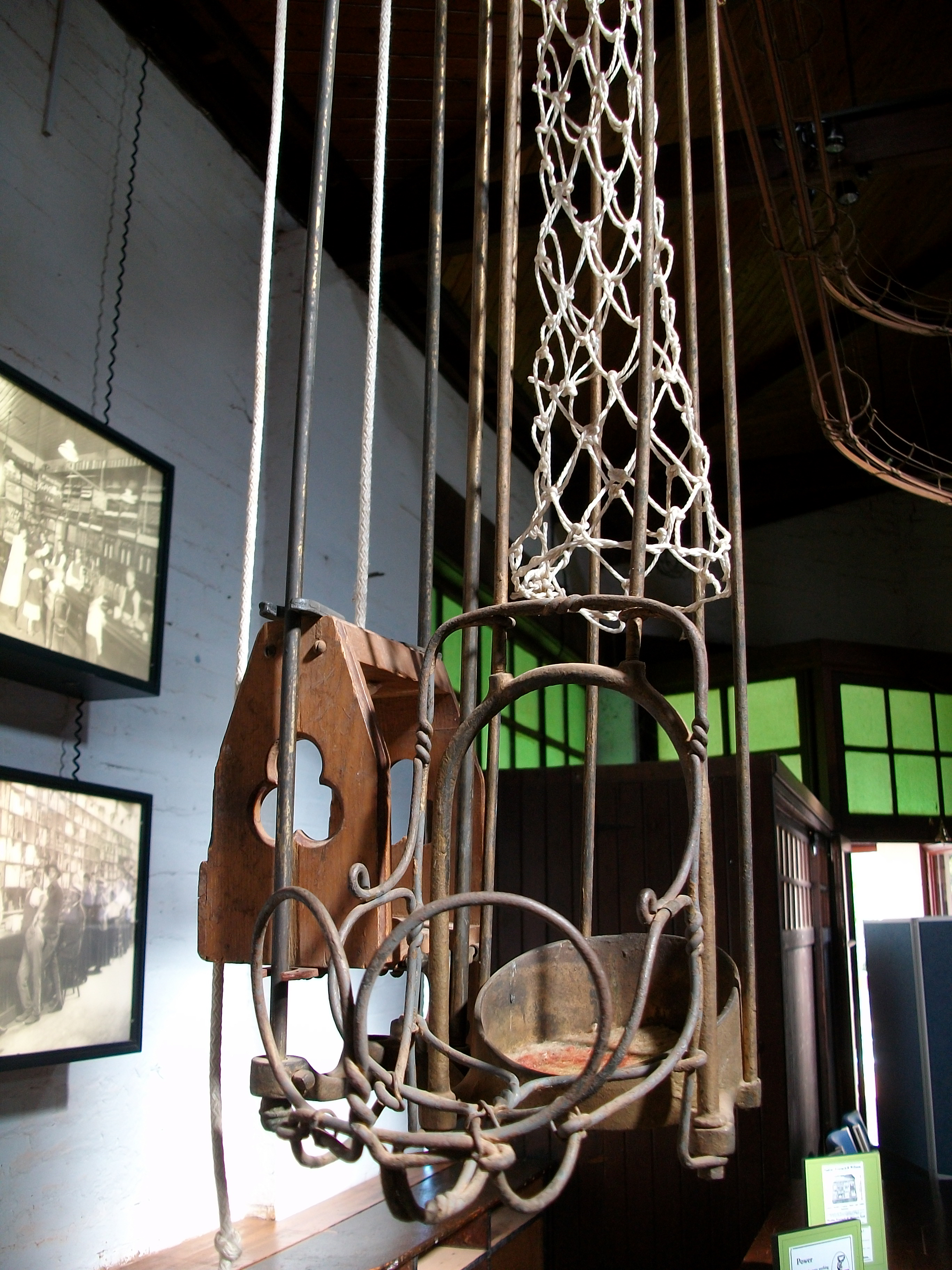
Cash ball system at the Up-To-Date Store, Coolamon, N.S.W.

Cash carriers were used in shops and department stores to carry customers' payments from the sales assistant to the cashier and to carry the change and receipt back again. The benefits of a "centralised" cash system were that it could be more closely supervised by management, there was less opportunity for pilfering (as change would be counted both by the cashier and by the sales assistant), and it freed up the assistant to attend to the customer and perhaps make further or better sales.

== Cash balls ==
The earliest type was a two-piece hollow wooden ball which ran along sloping rails, carrying cash and sales docket or receipt. One set of rails sloped down from sales desk to cash office and another set sloped in the opposite direction. This was known as a cash railway. William Stickney Lamson of Lowell, Massachusetts patented this system in 1881. His invention soon attracted the interest of other shopkeepers, and in 1882 along with Meldon Stephen Giles, the Lamson Cash Carrier Company was incorporated in Boston. A working example can be seen in the Co-operative store at Beamish Museum in North East England, and one is still in its original location in the Up-To-Date Store, now a museum, at Coolamon, New South Wales.

== Wire carriers ==
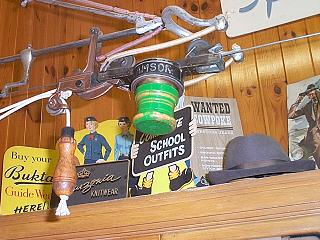
Rapid Wire carrier in Dartford Museum, Kent

The next type was a carriage suspended on pulleys from a wire between sales desk, launched from a catapult. The best-known types were "Rapid Wire" and "Air-Line."

Air-Line Company
The Air-Line Company was based in the United States. It manufactured a Gipe designed system. A cord passed over multiple pulleys to propel the car. Lamsons took over Air-Line and cars usually have "Air-Line" on one side and "Lamson" on the other.
Baldwin
Baldwins were based in Chicago. Their cash carrier systems were usually known as "Baldwin Flyers".
British Cash & Parcel Conveyors
A British competitor to Lamson which eventually was subsumed.
Dart Cash
Dart Cash was a British company established by a grocer from Stoke on Trent, William Alfred Edwards. It was a simple gravity carrier patented in 1918. Later enhancements included a spring for propulsion. As well as wire systems, Dart also made pneumatic cash carriers.
Gipe
Gipe was an American company founded by Emanuel Clarence Gipe of Freeport, Illinois. Gipe installations were popular in England. The car had two sets of wheels: the upper set ran on one wire and the lower set below a second wire. It was propelled by pulling the wires apart at the sending station by a lever arrangement.
Lamson
The Lamson Company dominated the market. It was known at various times as the Lamson Cash Carrier Company, the Lamson Cash Railway Company, the Lamson Store Service Company, the Lamson Consolidated Store Service Company, the Lamson Company Inc. and in the UK the Lamson Engineering Company Ltd. Lamsons purchased the Rapid Service Store Railway Company of Detroit which licensed an invention by Robert McCarty of Detroit, Michigan and their system became known as Lamson Rapid Wire. They also made cable systems and pneumatic tube systems.
Sturtevants
Sturtevants of Boston, Massachusetts was an offshoot of an American company. They purchased part of Reid Brothers around the early 1920s and the pneumatic tube business of Cooke, Troughton and Simms. In 1949 the part that handled pneumatic tubes was acquired by Lamsons.

== Cable systems ==
This system was developed by Joseph Martin of Vermont. In cable systems there was a continuously moving cable around the shop passing the counters and the cashier, driven by an electric motor. When a payment was to be sent, the sales assistant put it in a carrier and clipped it to the cable. The carrier was guided by light metal tracks. It was detached at the cashier's station, the transaction was dealt with, and the change and receipt were returned along the cable again. Twenty or more stations could easily be operated with a 1 horse-power motor. Lamsons offered two main types of system: the "Perfection" and the high-level "Preferred" where there was a "drop point" at the sales counter. The first shop to use the Lamson cable system was the Boston Store in Brockton (owned by James Edgar), which was founded in 1890. Although quite common in the United States, there were few installations in the United Kingdom.

A late survivor was at Joyners General Store in Moose Jaw, Saskatchewan, but the building burned down on New Year's Day, 2004.

Another existing example as of 2020 is at the G. D'Aoust & Cie Department Store in Sainte-Anne-de-Bellevue, QC which was installed in 1923.

== Pneumatic tube systems ==
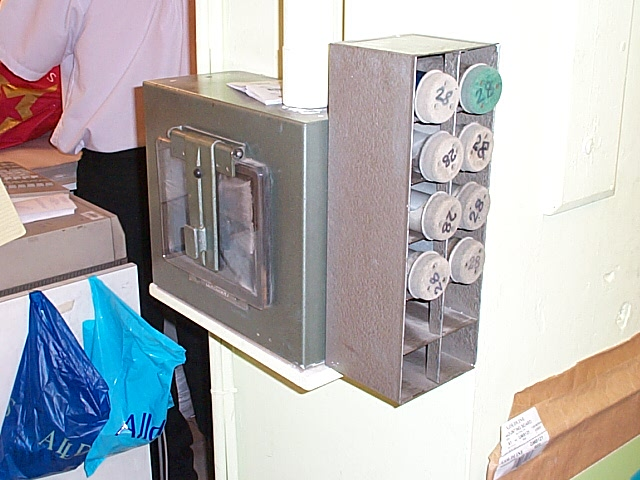
Pneu-Art terminal of pneumatic tube system at Arding & Hobbs department store, Clapham Junction, London

Several of the above companies also made pneumatic tube systems - see Lamson tube. They are still installed in a few shops. Modern pneumatic tube systems are also now used in supermarkets for moving cash in bulk from tills to the central cash office. An 1898 account of a pneumatic tube system installed in Kirkcaldie & Stains department store in Wellington, New Zealand, states:

In the basement is a half horse-power Crossley Bros. gas engine, which works a rotary blower, and this in turn supplies the compressed air required for the whole of the system. Distributed throughout the premises are 19 "stations" situated behind the various counters, these stations consisting simply of a valve in the pneumatic tubes which are carried to all parts of the building. On the second floor, in the vicinity of the tea room, these pneumatic tubes are centralised, and present very much the appearance of the front of a pipe organ — in fact, the room already goes by the name of the "organ loft". Each "pipe" of the "organ" terminates in a valve, and in what may be called the "keyboard" of the "organ" are placed a number of small wells, used for the reception of all kinds of coins, from a halfpenny up to a sovereign. Here sits the lady cashier, who occupies a very important and responsible position. A customer, we will say, in the dress department makes a purchase, and hands the saleswoman a sovereign in payment of a bill for 15s 6d. The bill and the sovereign are placed in a small round box, known as a "poppet"; the saleswoman opens the valve of the station behind her counter, places in it the poppet (which is made to fit the tube), shuts the valve again, and, hey presto! the poppet and its contents are sent up the tube to the "organ loft" and almost into the hands of the cashier. That official quickly opens the poppet, puts in it the bill and the necessary change, opens the valve and places it inside, closes the valve, and away goes the poppet on its return journey, the whole transaction occupying but very few seconds. Each station and the poppets in use at it will be numbered, so that there is no possibility of the cashier sending a poppet to the wrong station, and the whole system promises to work with a degree of smoothness and swiftness which cannot fail to give the most complete satisfaction.
