= Marrar, New South Wales =

Marrar
- Town
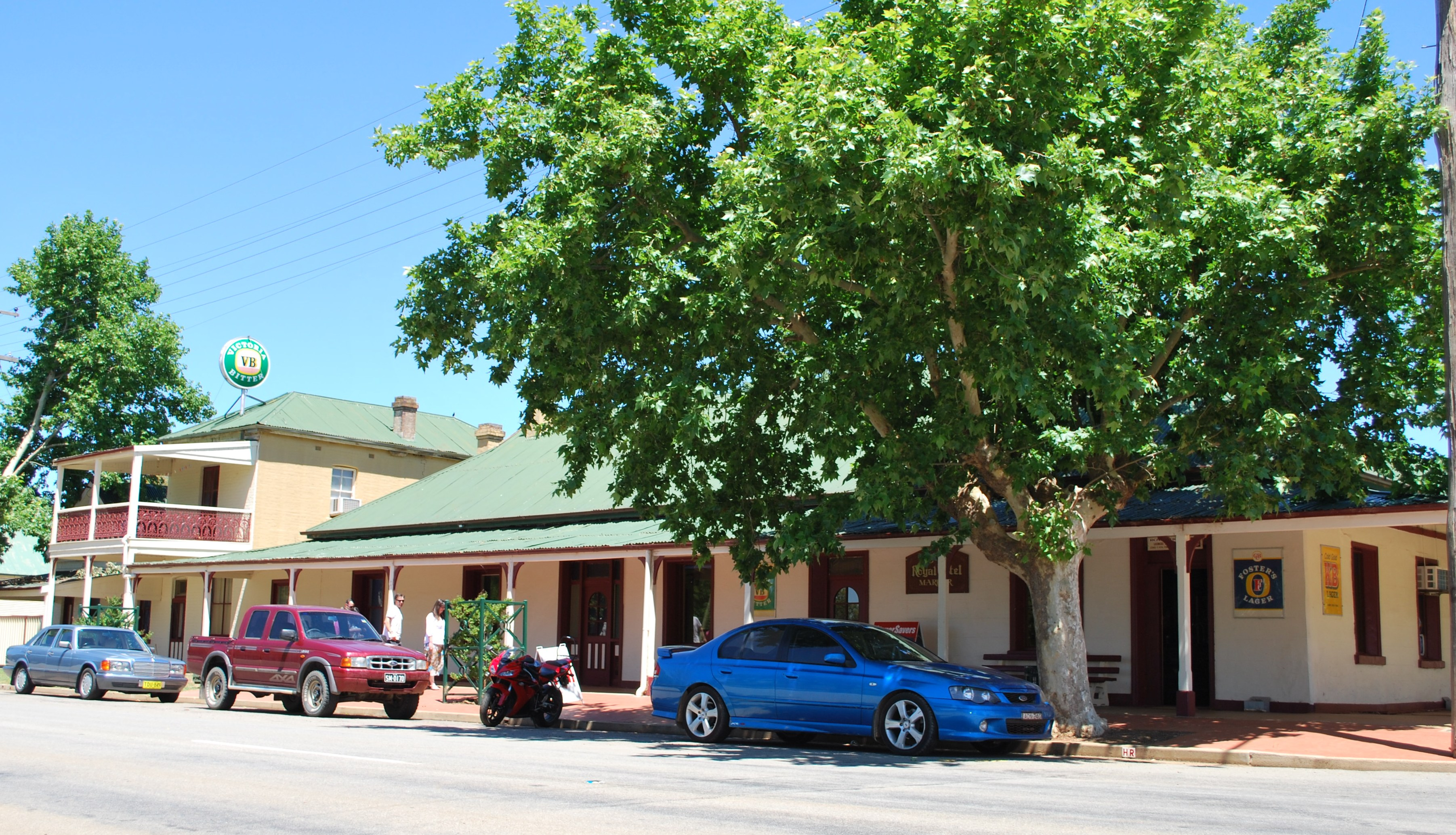
- Royal Hotel at Marrar

- Coordinates: 34°49′25″S 147°21′0″E
- Country: Australia
- State: New South Wales
- LGA: Coolamon Shire
- Location: 457 km (284 mi) SW of Sydney; 37 km (23 mi) N of Wagga Wagga; 28 km (17 mi) W of Junee; 15 km (9.3 mi) E of Coolamon

Government
  - State electorate: Cootamundra
  - Federal division: Riverina
- Elevation: 298 m (978 ft)

Population
  - Total: 368 (2016 census)
- Postcode: 2652
- County: Bourke

Marrar is a town in the central east part of the Riverina region of New South Wales. Australia. The town is situated about 21 kilometres (13 mi) west of Old Junee and 32 kilometres (20 mi) north of Downside. At the 2016 census, Marrar had a population of 368.

Marrar Post Office opened on 1 April 1902.

== Sport ==
The most popular sport in Marrar is Australian rules football, as it lies on the Canola Way, a geographical pocket stretching from the town to nearby Grong Grong, in which Australian football retains a strong following, despite New South Wales being a largely rugby league supporting state.

The Marrar Football Club was founded in 1918 and won the Coolamon District Football Association premiership in its first year.

The Marrar FC won three premierships in the South West Football League (New South Wales) in 1918, 1919 and 1923.

The Marrar FC played in the South West Football League (New South Wales) from 1919–26, 1932, 1949–51, then played the Albury & District Football League's Reserve competition from 1952 to 1956.

Marrar FC then played in the Central Riverina Football League from 1957 to 1981 and were premiers in 1965, 1966 and 1979 and were runners up in 1958, 1959, 1960, 1971, 1977, 1980 and 1981.

Marrar FC have played in the Farrer Football League since 1982 and have won senior football premierships in 1995 and 1996, 2017 and 2018.

The closest rugby league team is in nearby Junee. With that town fielding no Australian Rules team since 1987, Junee's Aussie Rules players travel to Marrar.

== Links ==
- Marrar FNC: Bonmbers Cententary Book
- South West Football League (New South Wales)
- Central Riverina Football League

| Preceding station | Former services | Following station |
|---|---|---|
| Coolamon towards Hay | Hay Line | Old Junee towards Junee |
