= Willbriggie, New South Wales =

Willbriggie
- Town
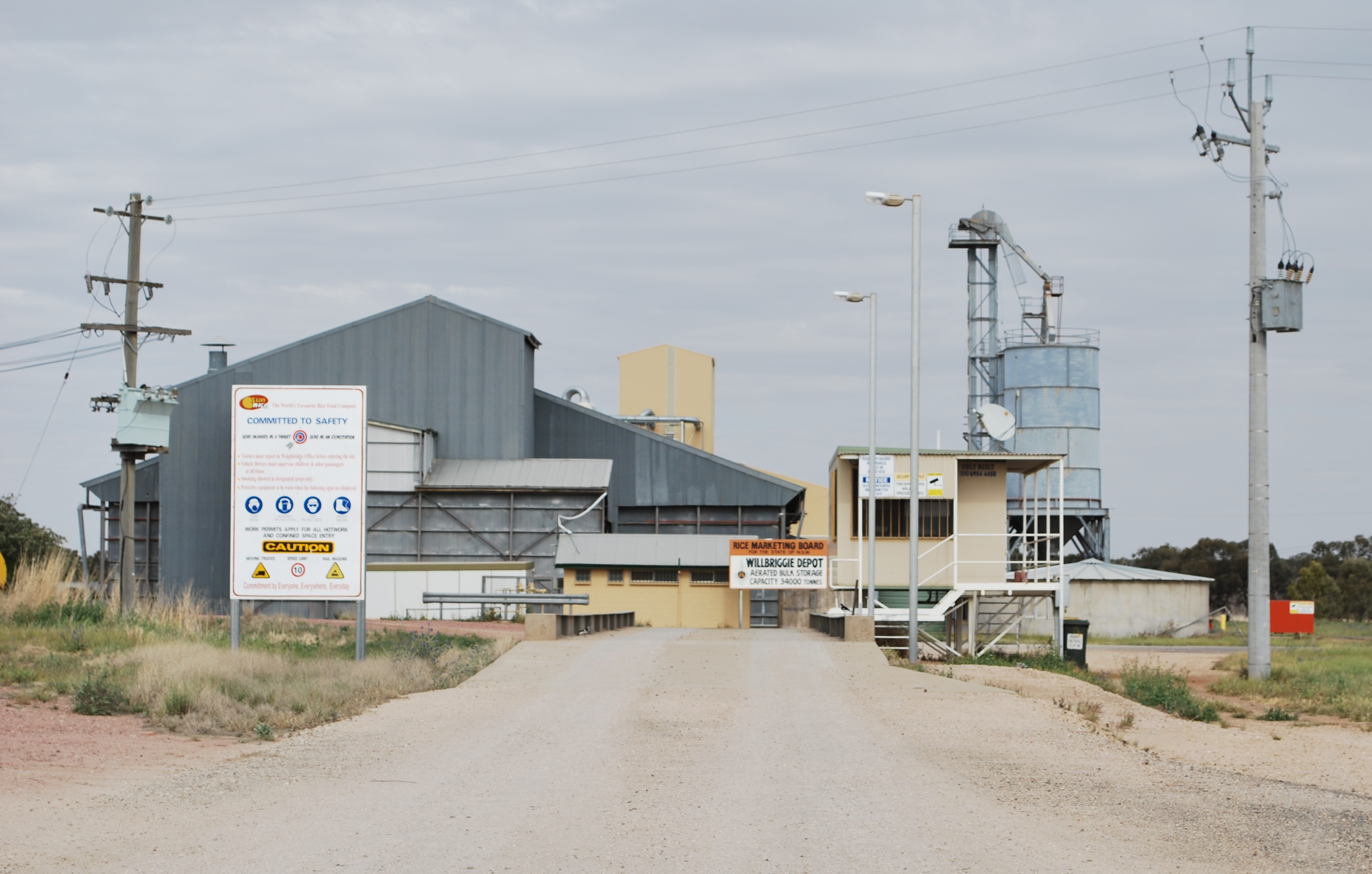
- The silo at Willbriggie

- Coordinates: 34°28′S 146°01′E
- Country: Australia
- State: New South Wales
- LGA: City of Griffith
- Location: 16 km (9.9 mi) from Darlington Point; 17 km (11 mi) from Hanwood

Government
  - State electorate: Murray
  - Federal division: Farrer
- Elevation: 122 m (400 ft)

Population
  - Total: 127 (2021 census)
- Postcode: 2680
- County: Cooper

Willbriggie is a community in the central part of the Riverina nearby to the city of Griffith. It is situated by road, about 16 kilometres north from Darlington Point and 17 kilometres south from Hanwood. At the 2021 census, Willbriggie had a population of 127.

Darlington Point Railway Station Post Office opened on 16 November 1881, was renamed Darlington Railway Station office in 1882, Willbriggie in 1909 and closed in 1975.

== Notes and references ==
| Preceding station | Former services | Following station |
|---|---|---|
| Benerembah towards Hay | Hay Line | Whitton towards Junee |
