= South Mail =

Former Australian train service

Overview
- Service type: Passenger train
- Status: Ceased
- Last service: May 1985
- Former operator: State Rail Authority

Route
- Termini: Sydney; Albury; Griffith
- Distance travelled: 642 km (Albury); 640 km (Griffith)
- Train number: SL9/SL10
- Lines used: Main South; Hay; Griffith

The South Mail was an Australian passenger train that ran from Sydney to Albury and Griffith until May 1985.

In June 1984, it was converted to XPT operation with the Griffith portion ceasing. With a lack of sleeping accommodation, patronage dwindled and the South Mail ceased operating in May 1985.
