= Old Junee =

- Town
- Coordinates: 34°50′10″S 147°30′53″E
- Country: Australia
- State: New South Wales
- LGA: Junee Shire
- Location: 8 km (5.0 mi) from Junee; 16 km (9.9 mi) from Marrar; 33 km (21 mi) N of Wagga Wagga

Government
  - State electorate: Cootamundra
  - Federal division: Riverina

Population
  - Total: 254 (SAL 2021)
- County: Clarendon

Old Junee is a small community in the central east part of the Riverina, about 8 kilometres north-west of Junee and 16 kilometres east from Marrar. It was originally known as "Jewnee"

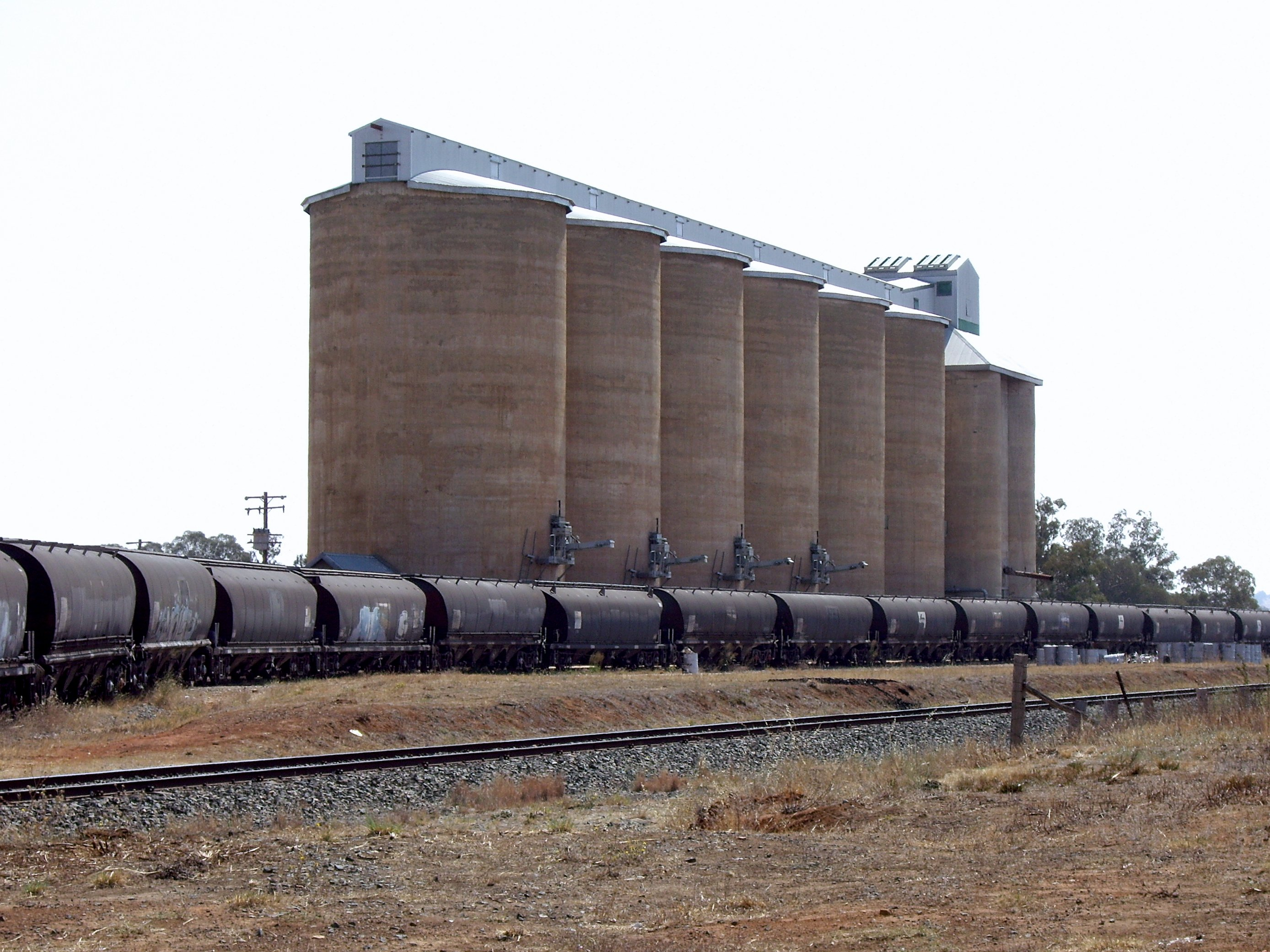
Silos at Old Junee, 2007

Jewnee post office was opened on 1 May 1862 and was renamed Old Junee in 1885 when the present town of Junee was given its name.

The school at Old Junee was opened in 1880 and was conducted in the old Methodist Church building, under the name "Provisional School, Jewnee". A short time later, Junee Junction sprang up, 5 miles (8.0 km) distant so, in 1885, the name of the school and the settlement was changed from Jewnee to Old Junee. The school at Junee Junction is now known as Junee School.

Harry D. Balmain was the first teacher and the oldest record at the school dates from 14 May 1880. For the portion of the quarter ending June, 1880, the total enrolment was 39 (20 boys, 19 girls), the average being 22.3. An amount of £2/8/0 was received in fees, there being no "gratuitous" scholars. The return was signed by Samuel Storey, as a member of the school board. Mr Storey officially opened the first school in 1880, a second building attached to the residence in 1882 and, on Empire Day 1913, the new, commodious building of two large rooms.

In 1894, W. H. Bullen was the teacher-in-charge, and he remained there until 1912 when W. E. Cook was appointed. Mr Bullen had leave of absence for three months in 1902 after 20 years' service, and was relieved by Messrs Hallman and Dawson for that period. In 1895, an urgent application was made for fencing to provide for four horses, probably for the use of children arriving at school by horse. Also in that year, the school acquired 8 acres (3.2 ha) for the school paddock.

In 1899, an application was made for the use of the playground for a Moonlight Concert in aid of the Cricket Cub – evidence of the importance of the little country school in the community.

Additions were made to the school buildings from time to time. In 1901, a bathroom and pantry were provided for the residence. In 1907 and 1911, a new bell post was required and, in 1913, a new school was provided, as mentioned earlier, when Mr Cook was Headmaster with Miss Catherine Sly as assistant, and the enrolment was 75 pupils. At that time, the school was Class IV, the area of the grounds was 2 acres (0.81 ha), with a reserve of 8 acres (3.2 ha) adjoining. An additional area of 1 acre (0.40 ha) for playground purposes had been surveyed but not dedicated.

The enrolment of 75 in 1913 had risen to nearly 90 by 1914. In 1916, the Roll of Honour was unveiled at the school and, in 1921, application was again made to use the school as a meeting place for a social club.

On 17 February 1928, the assistant teacher, L. Goodwin, was unable to report for duty owing to a wash-away on the railway line. Heavy rain throughout the district at that time flooded the town of Junee causing wash-aways. Many of businesses were flooded and major damage occurred to the railway line.

In 1929, when school opened for the year, there was no water available, and an application had to be made to buy and transport water from the railway station. During the early 1930s, enrolment had dropped considerably and difficulties were experienced in keeping an assistant teacher. At one stage, on 5 March 1935, there was no teacher at all. In that year, 30 children competed in the P.S.A.A.A. sports.

Improvements to the school continued. In 1927, the school accepted a gift of 100 volumes of suitable literature from Mr and Mrs G. LeGay Brereton. In 1938, fly screens were supplied and the parents fenced the school. Also in 1938, L. W. Storey donated 2 roods 25 perches (0.27 ha) of land to the school. The school was closed in 1966.

== Railway ==
Old Junee was on the railway line from Junee to Hay. The station there was opened in 1881, when the line was opened as far as Narrandera. The station was closed in about 1980.

Preceding station	Former services	Following station
Marrar towards Hay	Hay Line	Junee Terminus
