= Coolamon railway station =

Railway station in New South Wales, Australia

Coolamon
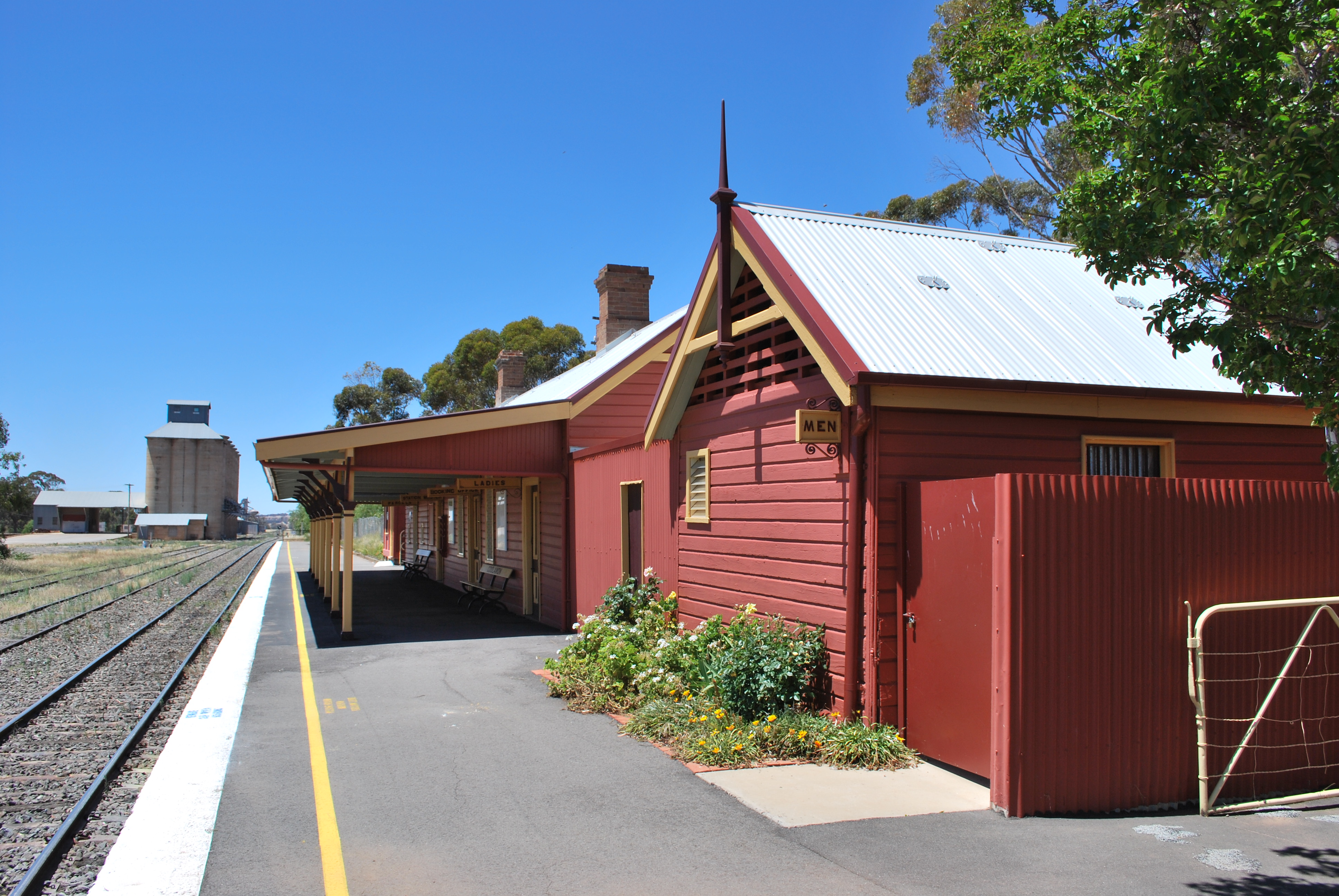
- Eastbound view of platform and building, November 2009

General information
- Location: Wade Street, Coolamon
- Coordinates: 34°48′58″S 147°12′06″E
- Owner: Transport Asset Manager of New South Wales
- Operator: NSW TrainLink
- Line: Hay
- Distance: 523.08 kilometres from Central
- Platforms: 1
- Tracks: 3

Construction
- Structure type: Ground
- Parking: Yes
- Accessible: Assisted access

Other information
- Station code: CLO

History
- Opened: 28 August 1881; 144 years ago

Services
Preceding station	NSW TrainLink	Following station
Narrandera towards Griffith	NSW TrainLink Southern Line Griffith Xplorer	Junee towards Sydney
Former services
Preceding station	Former services	Following station
Former NSW Branch line services
Ganmain towards Hay	Hay Line	Marrar towards Junee
Location

Coolamon railway station is located on the Hay line in New South Wales, Australia. It serves the town of Coolamon.

== History ==
Coolamon station opened on 28 August 1881 as Gawabbie. It was renamed Cooleman on 1 September 1881, and finally Coolamon on 1 December 1895. Opposite the platform lies a passing loop.

== Services ==
Coolamon is served by the twice weekly NSW TrainLink Xplorer between Griffith and Sydney split from Canberra services at Goulburn. NSW TrainLink also operate a road coach service from Wagga Wagga to Griffith via Coolamon.

Platform	Line	Stopping pattern	Notes
1	Southern Region	Services to Griffith & Goulburn	
