= Junee railway station =

Railway station in New South Wales, Australia

Junee
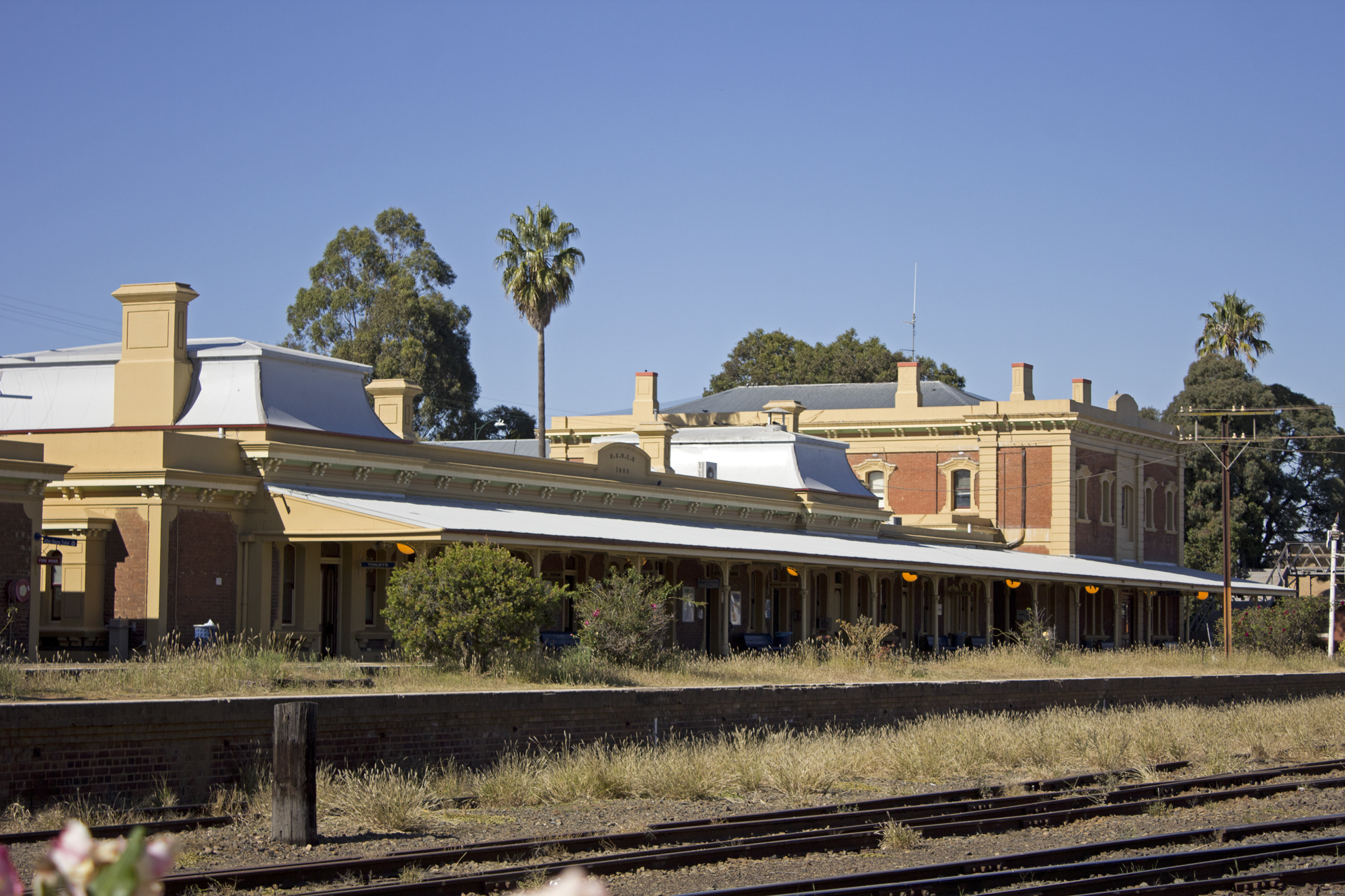
- Southbound view of platform and building, April 2012

General information
- Location: Railway Square, Junee; Australia
- Coordinates: 34°52′13″S 147°35′02″E
- Owner: Transport Asset Manager of New South Wales
- Operator: NSW TrainLink
- Lines: Main Southern; Hay
- Distance: 485.67 kilometres (301.78 mi) from Central
- Platforms: 1
- Tracks: 12

Construction
- Structure type: Ground
- Accessible: Yes

Other information
- Status: Weekdays: Staffed: 10.30am to 2.45pm: Weekends and public holidays: Unstaffed
- Station code: JUE

History
- Opened: 6 July 1878; 148 years ago
- Former names: Junee Junction (1881–1940)

Services
Preceding station	NSW TrainLink	Following station
Coolamon towards Griffith	NSW TrainLink Southern Line Griffith Xplorer	Cootamundra towards Sydney
Wagga Wagga towards Melbourne	NSW TrainLink Southern Line Melbourne XPT	Cootamundra towards Sydney
Former services
Preceding station	Former services	Following station
Former NSW Main line services
Harefield via Junee Racecourse towards Albury	Main Southern Line	Marinna towards Sydney
Former NSW Branch line services
Old Junee towards Hay	Hay Line	Terminus
Location
- Location within New South Wales

Junee railway station is a heritage-listed railway station located on the Main Southern line in New South Wales, Australia. It serves the town of Junee in the Riverina. It was added to the New South Wales State Heritage Register on 2 April 1999.

== Services ==
Junee is served by two daily NSW TrainLink XPT services in each direction operating between Sydney and Melbourne, and a twice weekly NSW TrainLink Xplorer between Griffith and Sydney split from Canberra services at Goulburn.

== History ==
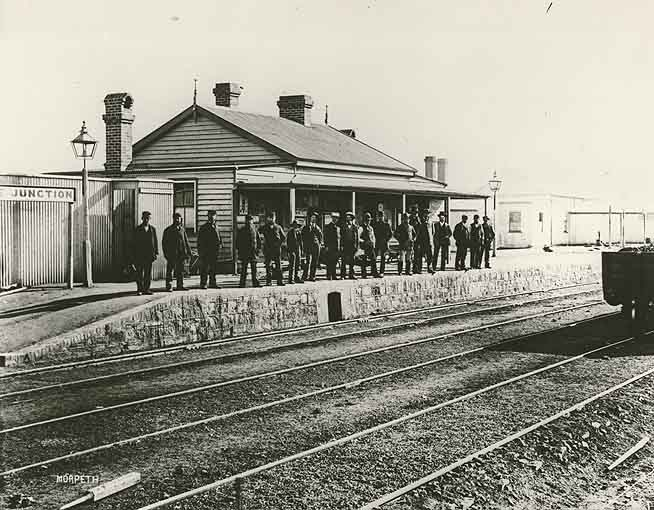
The station c.1882

Junee station opened on 6 July 1878 when the Main South line was extended from Bethungra. It served as the terminus until the line was extended to Bomen on 3 September 1878. Originally known as Junee, it was renamed Junee Junction on 28 February 1881 when the Hay line opened as far as Narrandera, before resuming its original name, Junee in April 1940.

A timber station building was constructed, and in 1881 the branch line to Narrandera from Junee Junction was opened. Over the next few years, many new branchlines were opened in the south west areas, and Junee henceforth became a major rail centre of the region and of New South Wales, with railway workshops having been moved to the town from Wagga. Junee developed rapidly during the 1880s as a result of its status as an important rail town. The arrival of the railway in Junee took place during the first main phase of railway building (1854–88) in the colony.

The original station building burned down in January 1882. Plans for a new building (the present station) were approved on 21 February 1883 and the station was opened by MLA Joseph Palmer Abbott on 5 March 1885; the station (including refreshment rooms) cost £3,434. The station building was constructed under the direction of John Whitton, Chief Engineer of the New South Wales Government Railways.

In January 1947 a 42 road, fully covered roundhouse was completed. The Junee Locomotive Depot was the last steam locomotive depot built by the New South Wales Government Railways. In July 1993 the State Rail Authority closed the depot. It is currently leased to rolling stock repairer Junee Railway Workshop as well as housing the Junee Roundhouse Railway Museum.

On 23 December 1999, the footbridge and signal gantry at the north end of the station were demolished when it was struck by a container.

== Description ==
The Junee railway station precinct includes the station building (1883), yard and the locomotive depot/roundhouse (1943–47).

=== Station (1883) ===
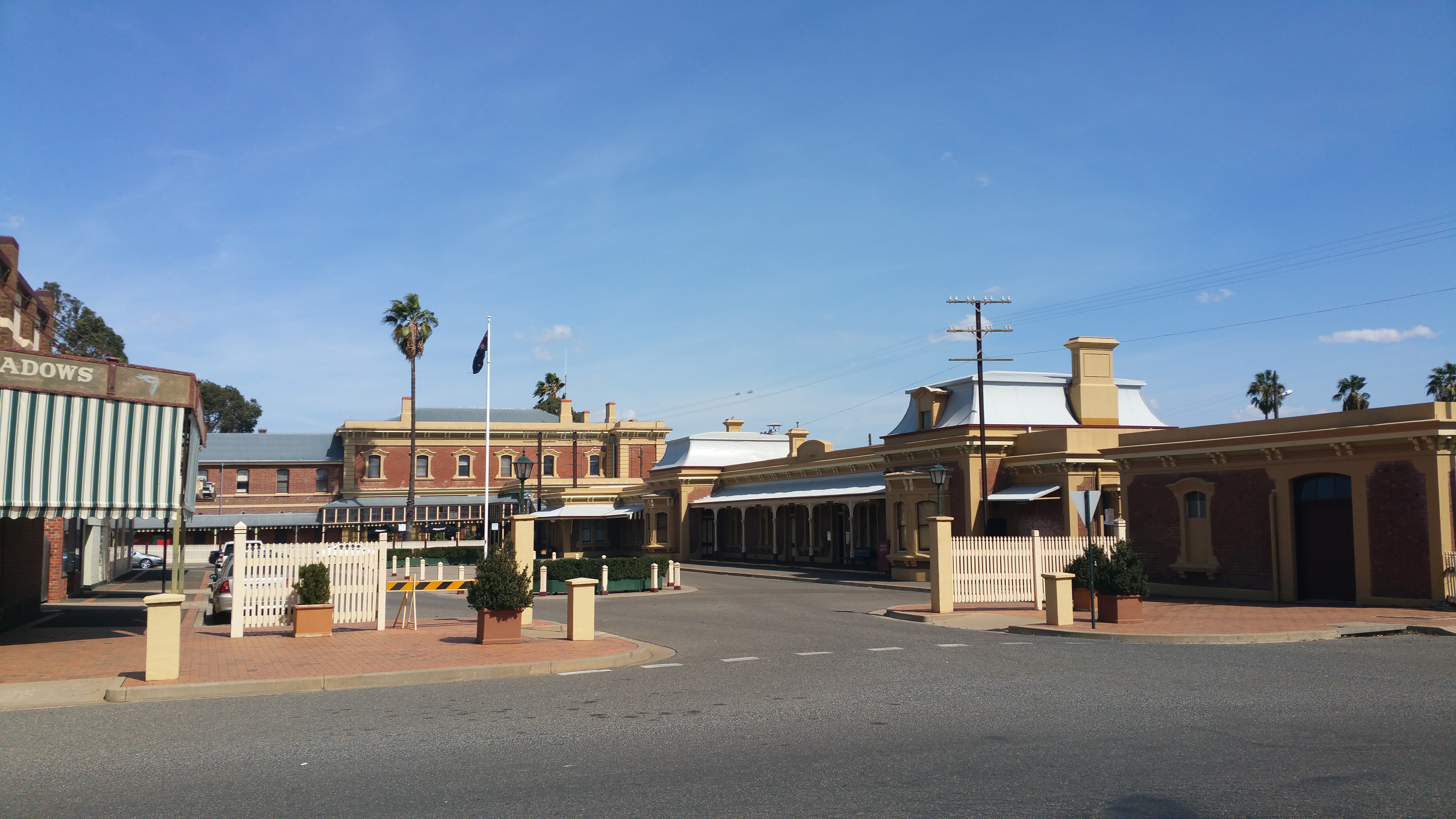
Station entrance

A good example of a Victorian Italianate Renaissance style railway station that has an important relationship in the urban sense to the other major buildings of the township.

Italianate building in the Ritz style, built in 1883 under the direction of John Whitton, Chief Engineer of the N.S.W.G.R. Symmetrically designed, the single storey low central section has its roof concealed by a parapet and is flanked either side by square pavilions having mansard curved roofs. Walls are face brick* and stucco with cast iron entrance verandah and platform canopy. Tuckpointed Flemish bond.

The Junee station building is an interesting building architecturally for its Victorian Free Classical style incorporates French Second Empire characteristics in the form of mansard roofs. The single storey building is constructed of face brick, with stucco decoration. It is symmetrical with a low, parapet roof; round or segmented pediments are centrally located on the parapet on the street and platform sides. The cornice beneath the parapet has paired brackets. At each end of the station there is a square pavilion with a mansard roof and a facet bay to the street side. An iron entrance verandah runs between the two pavilions on the street facade. There is stucco decoration to window surrounds, including label moulds. A long, iron verandah runs along the platform and the posts have decorative brackets; there is decorative iron work in the ends of the verandah roof. The station's chimneys are rendered. Simple stuccoed quoins are found on the building's corners. At one end of the station there is a small building of similar style and construction. The railway station is a key element in the streetscape of this part of Junee. Together with the large hotels and other buildings nearby, the station plays an important role in creating the historic qualities of central Junee.

The Station complex (in a 1944 photograph) included a garden room developed in the spaces between railway structures and buildings. Junee's was formally structured, with a central fountain and pond, circular path around it, perimeter paths, lawn and formal arrangement of flower beds cut into the lawn.

=== Locomotive Depot / Roundhouse ===
As built, the roundhouse and turntable arrangement at Junee consisted of a forty-two road roundhouse laid out in a radial pattern, from a central turntable. (This is a typical arrangement for roads laid out in a roundhouse). In addition, two roads allowed for arrival and departure of locomotives from the roundhouse roads.

The extant roundhouse building at Junee is circular in form, providing cover over 42 roads (1-42), with the remaining two roads, (the access/egress roads) being uncovered. It is of interest to note that each "half" of the roundhouse (i.e. the sector on either side of the arrival and departure roads) are of slightly different dimensions, to suit differing sizes in motive power. The inspection pits within each "half" are of different lengths to suit the different motive power.

Principal Dimensions

Length of side wall (i.e. from front doorway to rear wall of roundhouse) : 67 feet (west-side shed) and 82 feet (east-side shed). Approx. outside diameter of circle scribed by roundhouse : 400 feet

The principal construction features include a peaked roof formed by interior roof trusses with a ventilating ridge mounted on the peak of the roof. The roof is actually two symmetrically sloped roof sections. As built, smoke chutes above each shed road (forty-two in total) were provided, extending through the roof, mounted in the sloping roof section closest to the outer wall of the building. These were used for venting smoke to atmosphere from within the building. With the arrival of the diesel-electric locomotives, some of these chutes were removed or modified.

Principal construction materials are brick with roof trusses supported on concrete columns. Timber beams and trusses with steel bracing and straps are also used in construction. Flooring is concrete. Windows / translucent sheeting is provided in sections of the rear or outer wall to assist with natural lighting. Inspection pits and steps are provided on each road. (Some of the original construction materials and features have had minor changes and improvements during the 80 year life of the building).

Other equipment associated with the locomotive roundhouse and depot includes a 100-foot diameter electrically operated turntable (the only one in the state), a machine shop, a store and amenities building, and a number of administrative buildings.

=== Moveable Heritage ===
The moveable heritage at Junee is considered significant such that it has its own heritage listing separate to that of the station complex. The listing includes:

On the platforms:

- all station signage, the blue timber platform benches with incised "Junee" lettering, the double-sided Timetic electric clock suspended under platform canopy, the gooseneck platform lamp posts, the bell and chain under the canopy, the wall-mounted carriage lamps, the cast iron stormwater grates, the original and early door and window hardware (locks, handles, sash locks and lifts etc.), the Semaphore signal in yard, the three Countrylink luggage trolleys, large circular concrete planter pots

In the platform building and offices:

- the fitted timber waiting room benches, original and early light fittings, switches, chains and timber mounting blocks, cast iron and concrete door thresholds and boot scrapers, timber surrounds and cast iron grates, the bevelled mirror with moulded timber frame, large four-panel Victorian timber doors in storage, steel trolley in storage, timber pigeonhole shelving, timber desk with turned legs and drawers, square timber desk with turned legs, possibly cedar, large desk with drawers, c. 1960s, open timber desk shelving, luggage scales, red Ajax safe

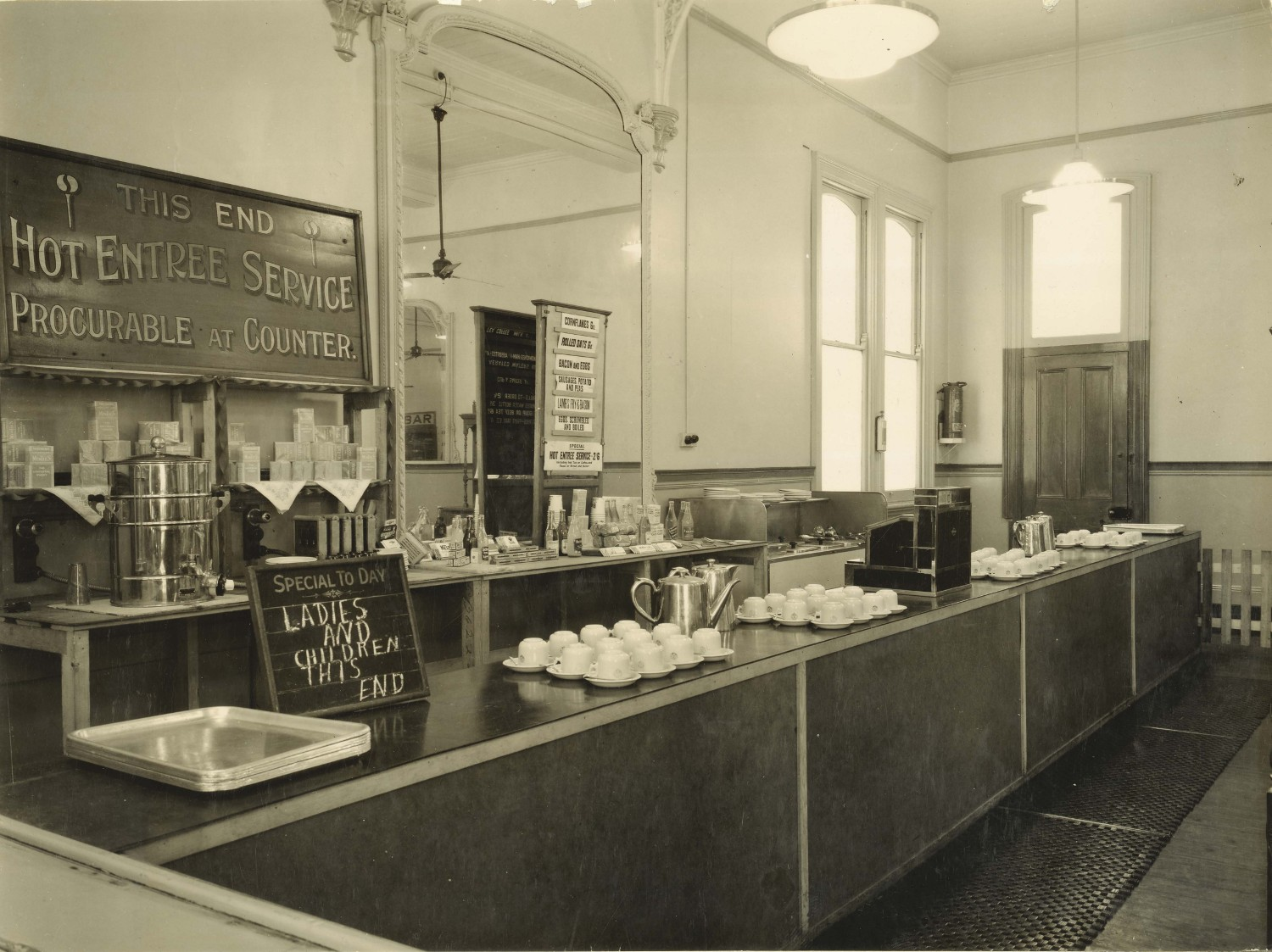
Junee Railway Refreshment Room, 1950

In the Refreshment Rooms:

- the large wall mirrors, framed prints, cupboards and cabinets, curved timber bar and cabinetry, galvanised bucket, signal lamps, "Safety Notices" cabinet, framed prints, illuminated sign "Counter meal services", Bakelite speaker on wall, cast iron urn and plinth, cast iron stove /range – J Ward Ltd Sydney – in kitchen, blackboards in storage, fitted timber racking in kitchen, circular coat hooks in storage, wardrobe / cabinet c. 1930s, timber screen panel doors in storage, timber pigeonhole cabinet, and a cast iron piece of machinery of unknown function

=== Condition ===
The building was in constant government service for more than 45 years, followed by 9 years of service as a railway heritage collection centre and private railway operator's maintenance depot. Consequently, some sections of the structure show signs of minor wear and tear.

Apart from some minor deterioration and alterations carried out as the form of motive power changed, and the local heritage group occupied the premises, the building and other equipment is in reasonably good condition, both internally and externally.

Externally, the building retains its typical railway appearance. Even though its original purpose (the servicing of steam locomotives) has been altered to suit newer motive power, with a subsequent change to work methods and equipment, the integrity of the roundhouse has been retained.

Internally, the building retains a high degree of integrity due to the retention of original construction features and details.

== Heritage listing ==
Junee railway station was one of the principal locomotive servicing and maintenance depots for steam locomotives (later diesel-electric locomotives and diesel rail cars) in use in the far southern region of the state, including those locomotives in use on the mainline and branchlines in the area. Those branchlines included the Junee-Narrandera area and all branches radiating from there, and the numerous branches which junction with the main southern line between Wagga Wagga and Albury. The 42-road roundhouse was completed in the late 1940s period. Junee roundhouse was the largest complete roundhouse building in the state, and the locomotive depot serviced, repaired and maintained the largest steam motive power in use in the state for more than 25 years. The depot remained in government service for approximately 46 years.

Many major components of important railway centres and work precincts have been demolished or otherwise removed or substantially modified and as a consequence, their past use can no longer be shown.

In the 1940s, through to the 1950s period (arguably the pinnacle of steam locomotive operations in the state), the railway precinct at Junee consisted of a large railway station, a relatively large and important shunting yard, a Train Control Centre, two large signal boxes, junction arrangements for the Junee-Narrandera-Hay-Griffith branchline and a relatively modern locomotive depot. The depot comprised a roundhouse, large elevated coal bunker (for fuelling steam locomotives), boiler wash-out plant, ash handling arrangements, large and modern machine shop and a substantial amount of equipment essential for the rapid and efficient servicing and repair of the steam locomotives working in the district.

In recent years, the large marshalling yard, although essentially intact is used for stowing train loads, rather than the original function of re-marshalling trains. In addition, a number of the significant items of equipment installed at the locomotive depot have been removed or demolished, mostly associated with the removal of steam locomotives from service and the then increasing use of diesel-electric locomotives.

The roundhouse and some of the other items associated with the depot remain in situ and are in remarkably good condition.

Deleted items include the coal bunker, de-ashing arrangement, hot water boiler wash-out plant and a number of small buildings.

The roundhouse at Junee represents a once busy and large significant locomotive servicing centre.

The extant building, which represents the Junee locomotive depot precinct is assessed as having state significance.

Junee railway station was listed on the New South Wales State Heritage Register on 2 April 1999 having satisfied the following criteria.

The place is important in demonstrating the course, or pattern, of cultural or natural history in New South Wales.

The historic value of the locomotive roundhouse and turntable at Junee should be considered in a statewide context. The items are historically significant because they represent part of a fine example of an important locomotive depot, the principal repair, locomotive service and maintenance facility for the far southern region of the state. The depot, its servicing facilities and the men who worked there were responsible for provision of reliable mainline and branch line locomotives operating on the main southern line and on the lengthy branchlines.

The place has a strong or special association with a person, or group of persons, of importance of cultural or natural history of New South Wales's history.

Junee roundhouse is (was) part of a statewide network of locomotive servicing centres which comprises buildings of this style (i.e. roundhouses), buildings incorporating straight engine sheds or open areas where locomotives were repaired or stabled. Most of these centres have been removed from railway service, but this roundhouse and the other equipment shows the link between trains, local industry, engineering capacity, handling of mainline and branchline passenger and goods services and local employment.

The place is important in demonstrating aesthetic characteristics and/or a high degree of creative or technical achievement in New South Wales.

A railway precinct such as Junee, complete with passenger station, locomotive depot and equipment, marshalling yard and other railway facilities immediately gives the appearance of intense activities in all weathers. Much of the evidence of the past activities at Junee has been deleted, but there are a number of representative and significant structures extant. The item is aesthetically significant because the original fabric and architectural features of the 1940s built roundhouse are intact.

The place has strong or special association with a particular community or cultural group in New South Wales for social, cultural or spiritual reasons.

Railway stations, signal boxes, shunting yards and locomotive depots represent a place of work in both railway employment terms and state employment terms. The "railways" were for many years, the largest employer in NSW, with staff in all corners of the state in numerous positions. The railways were (and still are) a 24-hour / day, seven day / week operation and staff were employed to maintain that position.

The roundhouse, turntable and other structures which comprise Junee locomotive depot are socially significant because they are excellent representations of a source of much employment in the southern highlands region of the state. The wages for these employees added to the local prosperity. In addition, the success of local business resulted from their ability and opportunity to supply the local railway establishments with goods and services. Large and busy railway facilities in town usually meant success and prosperity for the locality.

The place has potential to yield information that will contribute to an understanding of the cultural or natural history of New South Wales.

Junee locomotive depot with the roundhouse, turntable and other railway buildings represent a past era. The precinct illustrates an era where large scale transport of passengers and goods by rail was commonplace. The roundhouse and other equipment were essential for these intense rail activities, involving passenger and goods, in an age when trains were the principal means of transport for the population.

The items are technically and research significant because the roundhouse and its equipment are the remnants of a past era, located in an area of the state where railway played so much a part in development and essential transport, both interstate and intrastate.

The place possesses uncommon, rare or endangered aspects of the cultural or natural history of New South Wales.

Steam locomotives were the principal form of railway motive power in New South Wales for approximately 110 years (1855–1965). As such, steam locomotive servicing facilities incorporating engine sheds or roundhouse were established at approximately 150 sites in the state. It is also estimated that 120 straight engine sheds and 25 roundhouses were also built, all there buildings being part of statewide locomotive servicing arrangements.

By the year 2002, only four engine sheds remain in the state, and nine roundhouses (or part roundhouses) are extant.

The Junee roundhouse is assessed as being a rare and endangered example of the state's historical and cultural environment.

The place is important in demonstrating the principal characteristics of a class of cultural or natural places/environments in New South Wales.

The basic shape and form of railway roundhouses are similar – a circular or part circular building containing railway tracks arranges radially (fan shaped) around a centrally placed turntable.

There were differences in design of roundhouse buildings, mainly associated with roof shape, numbers of roads enclosed, location of windows and construction materials.

Demolition and removal of many roundhouses (16) and most engine sheds has resulted in the loss of many features of these railway buildings.

Junee roundhouse represents a class of industrial building which has almost disappeared from the state.
