= Leeton railway station =

Railway station in New South Wales, Australia

Leeton
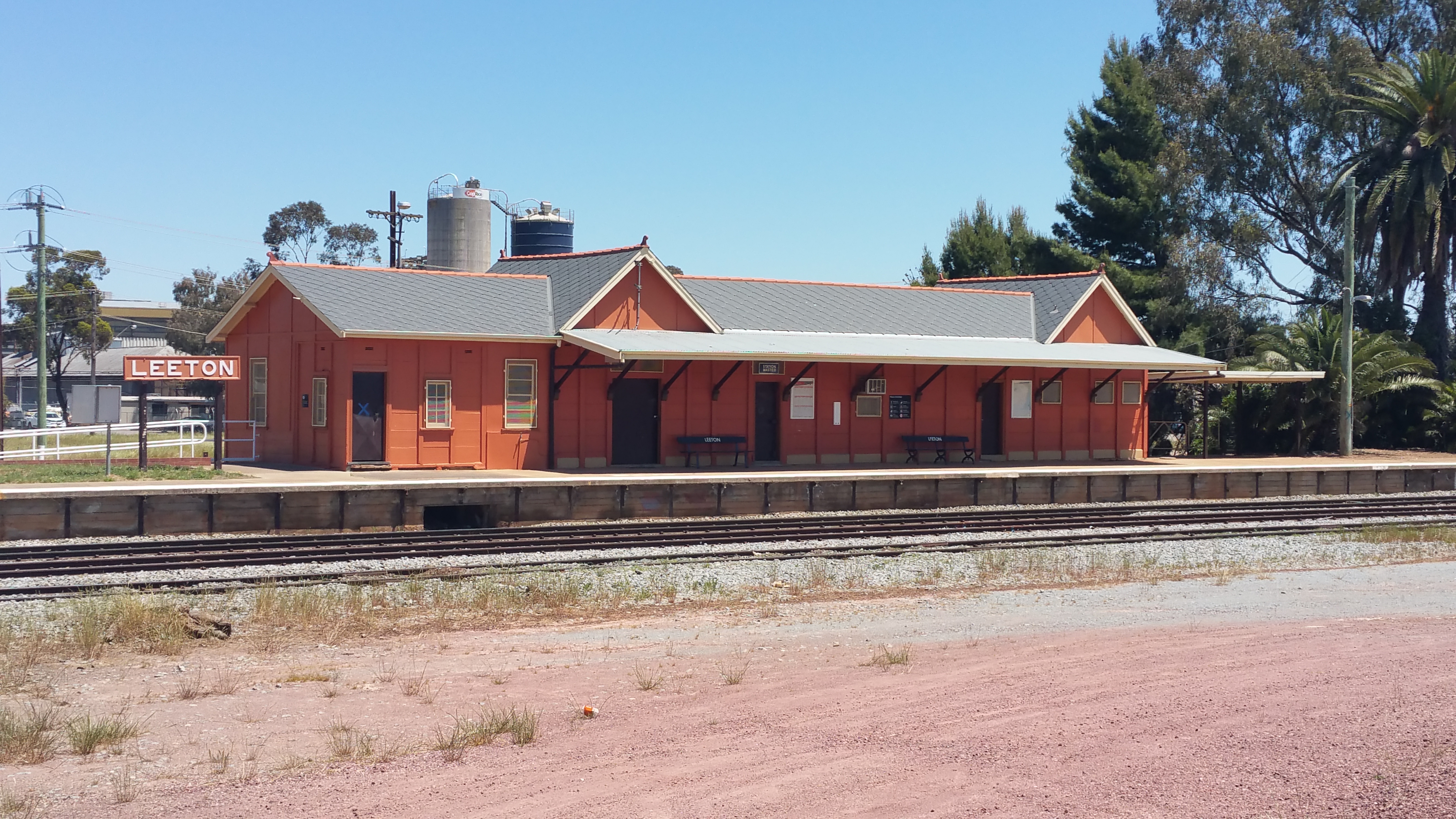
- Station building and platform, October 2016

General information
- Location: Railway Avenue, Leeton
- Coordinates: 34°33′16″S 146°23′52″E
- Owner: Transport Asset Manager of New South Wales
- Operator: NSW TrainLink
- Line: Yanco–Griffith
- Distance: 612.64 kilometres from Central
- Platforms: 1
- Tracks: 3

Construction
- Structure type: Ground
- Accessible: Yes

Other information
- Station code: LEE

History
- Opened: 6 March 1922; 104 years ago

Services
Preceding station	NSW TrainLink	Following station
Griffith Terminus	NSW TrainLink Southern Line Griffith Xplorer	Narrandera towards Sydney

New South Wales Heritage Register
- Official name: Leeton Railway Station and yard group
- Type: State heritage (complex / group)
- Designated: 2 April 1999
- Reference no.: 1178
- Type: Railway Platform / Station
- Category: Transport – Rail
Location

Leeton railway station is a heritage-listed former goods yard and railway station and now bus station and railway station located on the Yanco–Griffith line at Dunn Avenue in Leeton in the Leeton Shire local government area of New South Wales, Australia. It is also known as Leeton Railway Station and yard group. The property was added to the New South Wales State Heritage Register on 2 April 1999.

== History ==
The NSW Government's plans for the Murrumbidgee Irrigation Area (MIA) Scheme, commenced with the Barren Jack Dam (Burrinjuck Dam) and Murrumbidgee Canals Construction Act 1906. Construction of the dam commenced in March 1907 with the construction of initial site facilities. Much of the work was to be undertaken by the Public Works Department, which included the construction of canals, weirs, channels and bridges. With this irrigation system in operation, the Government hoped to attract hundreds of new immigrants to a new farming region. The building of a narrow gauge railway to provide access to the site was also commenced in 1907.

The Murrumbidgee Irrigation Act 1910 established the Murrumbidgee Irrigation Trust. Minister for Public Works, Arthur Hill Griffith, was appointed as first chairman of the Trust in 1911. It was soon obvious that the grand scheme was beyond the competency of the Trust, and so the Irrigation Act 1912 saw the Trust superseded by a Commissioner for Water Conservation and Irrigation (the Water Conservation and Irrigation Commission, or WC&IC). The first Commissioner, Leslie Wade, was appointed from 1 January 1913.

Wade's vision for the MIA was "looking to new railways to service the area, new business enterprises to handle and market the produce, processing facilities, power generation, and domestic water supplies and commercial service centres to support the expected population. Two urban designs were required. The town of Leeton, named after the prominent MIA supporter Charles Lee and (the town of) Griffith after Sir Arthur Griffith." Wade saw an opportunity for his vision in 1913 when Walter Burley Griffin came to Australia after winning the international competition for the design of the new national capital in Canberra. "For Leeton, Griffin proposed a new town centre around a prominent hill. Two water reservoir towers on top of the hill were to provide the main entrance to the town. A grand central plaza would lead from the towers, complete with ornamental pools and a fountain. The drawings depict large buildings with typical Griffin geometric forms similar to those that grace the Griffin drawings for the national capital".

"During 1914 Griffin was sending blueprints of the Griffith railway line and was also undertaking the urban design for Griffith, including the terminus for the Barellan to Griffith railway then under construction." Leslie Wade suddenly died on 12 January 1915. With the project's key promoter gone and Australia's involvement in a world war imminent, enthusiasm for the grand project waned.

"Leeton got its circular street pattern and water towers, the first of which was completed in 1915, with their classic Griffin features. For years they were framed by the typical "outback architecture" of the School of Arts building erected by the WC&IC; in 1913. A railway connection was made with Narrandera in 1922 and the infrastructure of a typical Australian rural town emerged over the years". Leeton station opened on 6 March 1922. Opposite the platform lies a passing loop.

Leeton became a settlement for post World War I migrants and soldiers who came to settle in the MIA. The Yanco to Griffith line opened from Narrandera to Griffith on 6 March 1922 and was used to freight vegetable and horticultural produce from the MIA to Sydney markets and ports.

In June 1921 a goods shed was transferred from Bangaroo to Leeton for use by the Construction Branch. Leeton station opened on 6 March 1922 with a concrete drop slab station building, signal box and 123-metre-long (404 ft) platform on the Down side just past the goods traffic level crossing. The precast concrete drop panel construction for station buildings became a standard railway construction method, particularly throughout the 1920s. Approximately 140 precast drop-panel concrete station buildings were constructed in regional NSW during 1919–1932. There were five standard designs that ranged from the Ac1 which was a simple waiting room, through to larger station buildings such as the Ac5 which was used at Leeton and featured five rooms in a U-shape form with front verandah. The standard designs were later reissued as Pc1- Pc3 in c. 1925.

The original arrangement at Leeton included a crossing loop between the platform road and the goods loop siding, the latter serving a goods shed and loading dump platform. At the Down side of the yard there were various sidings including those for the Leeton canning factory and butter factories, and on the Down side there was also a stock loop siding for stock races. A triangle for turning locomotives was provided behind the passenger station.

In July 1923 a crossing loop and five-tonne (six-short-ton) gantry crane were erected and in September 1938 a triangle was installed. A 90-kilolitre (19,797 imp gal; 23,775 US gal) single-tier water tank on timber stand was located between the goods shed and loading dump platform, probably in c. 1938. An additional siding was provided in 1936 for fruit growers. A footbridge was constructed in 1959 by the local Council.

In 1965 the parcels room was enlarged, and the signal box incorporated into the main structure. The wheat stacking siding was removed in c. 1988. The station building is now used as a Countrylink coach stop and as an operational railway station two days per week. The former goods yard is no longer in use.

== Description ==
Major structures – Managed by Transport Asset Holding Entity

- Station Building – type 12, standard "Ac5" precast concrete (1922)
- Platform – concrete
- Signal Box – pre cast concrete, now part of Station Building (1922, relocated/ modified 1965)

Major structures – Managed by ARTC

- Goods Shed (c. 1921)
- Goods Loading Bank (c. 1920)
- Weighbridge and Hut (c. 1922)

Station building (1922)

The station building is constructed of concrete drop slab panels, a standard material used throughout regional NSW during the 1920s. The main building presents as a symmetrical elevation, with a 1965 extension to the east to incorporate the original signal box. The roof is gabled with two protruding transverse gables at each end. The roof was originally clad in asbestos cement tiles, but has been partially reclad in painted corrugated iron.

The original building is a "U" shape floor plan which originally incorporated five rooms, with central waiting room and Station Master's office, flanked by a store and parcels room in one wing, with a ladies waiting room and bathrooms in the other. A verandah is incorporated on the roadside elevation between the two projecting wings. The platform elevation features a large awning supported on simple timber brackets. Windows are double hung timber framed.

Signal box (1922)

The signal box was originally constructed in 1922 at the same time as the station building, which was also constructed from precast concrete drop slab panels. In 1965, the station building was extended, which resulted in the signal box being incorporated into the main form of the station building. As such, the roof profile of the original signal box has been altered to be incorporated under the new gable of the 1965 extension.

Landscape

Plantings – on platform palm trees in particular.

Moveable items

Station seats and the station sign.

=== Condition ===
As at 18 July 2013, buildings are generally in good condition. Leeton station building has retained a moderate degree of integrity and intactness, albeit with later extensions. The original form and construction of the building are still evident. The precinct has a low level of intactness.

=== Modifications and dates ===
In 1965 the parcels room was modified, and the signal box was incorporated into the station building.

== Services ==
Leeton is served by the twice weekly NSW TrainLink Xplorer between Griffith and Sydney split from Canberra services at Goulburn. NSW TrainLink also operate a road coach service from Wagga Wagga to Griffith via Leeton.

Platform	Line	Stopping pattern	Notes
1	Southern Region	Services to Griffith & Goulburn	

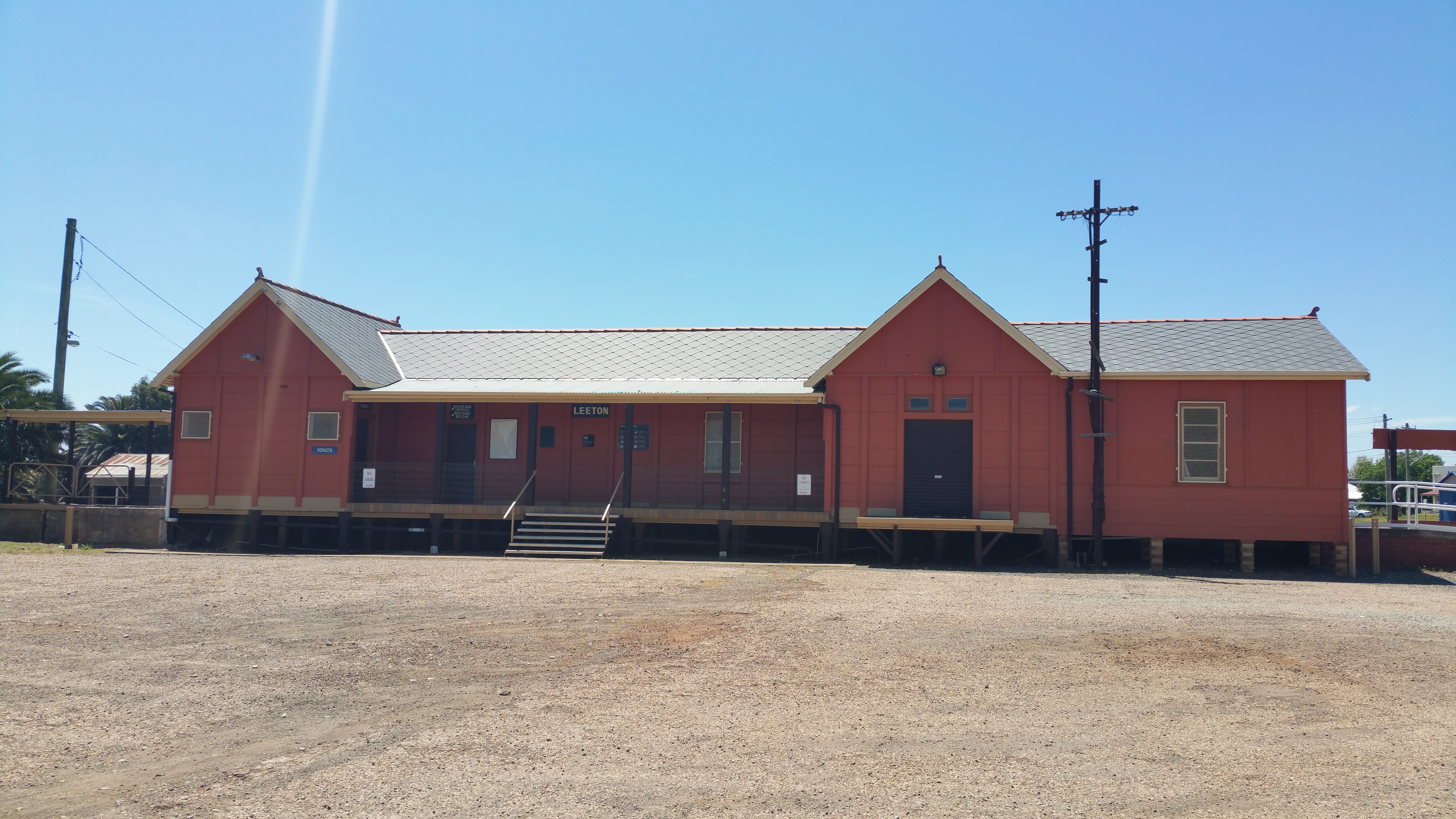
Station building seen from carpark

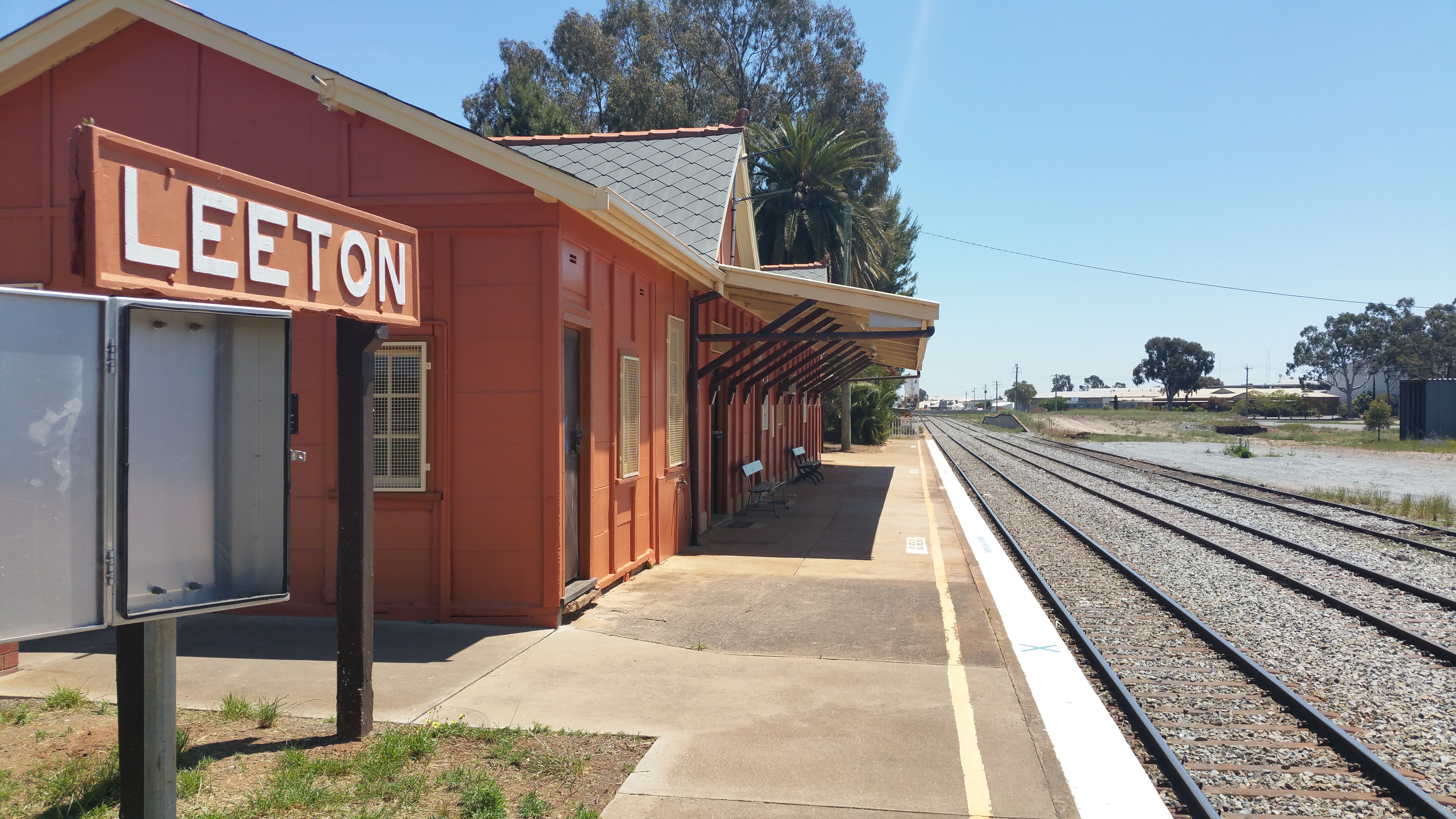
Northbound view

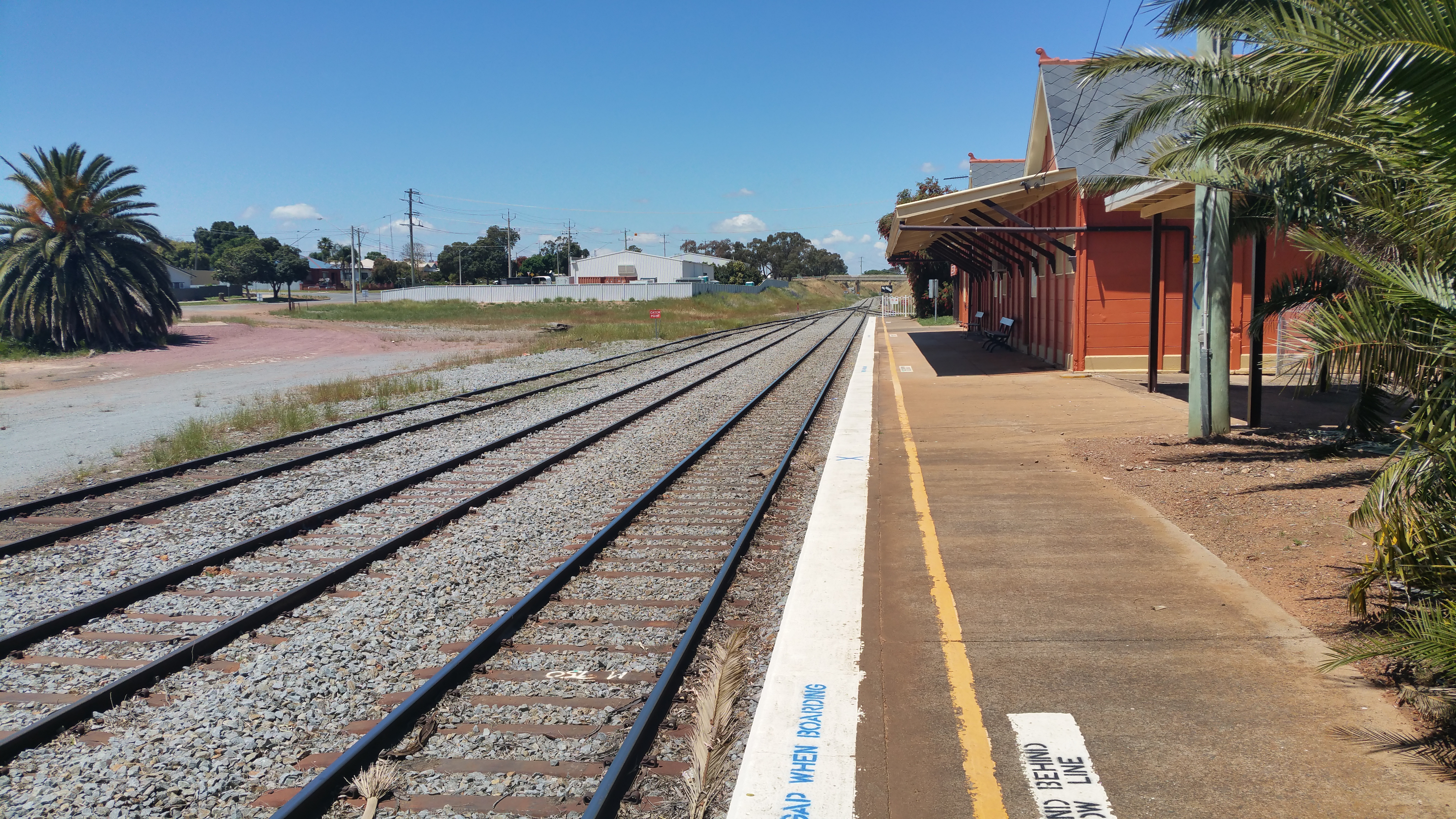
Southbound view

== Heritage listing ==
As at 18 July 2013, Leeton Railway Precinct is of state significance as an intact example of a large precast concrete station building and is one of only two similar examples in NSW. Over 140 precast concrete station buildings were constructed in NSW, and Leeton is one of only a few known examples of this scale. The construction of the railway station was an integral component of the Murrumbidgee Irrigation Area (MIA) Scheme which provided the opportunity for new agricultural resources to be grown and freighted by rail to the rest of NSW. Following World War I, the town became a settlement for migrants and returned soldiers, who travelled by train to embark on a new life. The site of the railway precinct is important for its historic link to the original urban plan of Leeton by Walter Burley Griffin. The other remaining railway structures including the signal box, goods shed and weighbridge collectively demonstrate widespread 20th century railway customs, activities and design in NSW.

Leeton railway station was listed on the New South Wales State Heritage Register on 2 April 1999 having satisfied the following criteria.

The place is important in demonstrating the course, or pattern, of cultural or natural history in New South Wales.

The site of the railway precinct is important for its historic link to the design of the town of Leeton by Walter Burley Griffin. The construction of the railway station was an integral component of the NSW government's ambitious Murrumbidgee Irrigation Area (MIA) Scheme which provided the opportunity for new agricultural resources to be grown and freighted by rail to the rest of NSW. Following World War I, the town became a settlement for migrants and returned soldiers, who travelled by train to embark on a new life.

The place is important in demonstrating aesthetic characteristics and/or a high degree of creative or technical achievement in New South Wales.

The station building is significant as a good example of a large standard precast concrete station building constructed in NSW in the 1920s.

The place has a strong or special association with a particular community or cultural group in New South Wales for social, cultural or spiritual reasons.

The site is of social significance to the local community on account of its lengthy association for providing an important source of employment, trade and social interaction for the local area. The site is significant for its ability to contribute to the local community's sense of place, is a distinctive feature of the daily life of many community members, and provides a connection to the local community's past.

The place possesses uncommon, rare or endangered aspects of the cultural or natural history of New South Wales.

The station building at Leeton is considered rare as one of two examples of a surviving Ac5 type standard precast concrete station building in NSW, the other located at Willow Tree. Over 140 precast concrete buildings were constructed in NSW, and Leeton is one of approximately 24 extant.

The place is important in demonstrating the principal characteristics of a class of cultural or natural places/environments in New South Wales.

The place has representative significance for its collection of railway structures including the signal box, goods shed, which are representative of similar items that are found in many other railway sites across the state.

== See also ==
- List of railway stations in regional New South Wales
