= Yanco–Griffith railway line =

Branch railway line in New South Wales, Australia

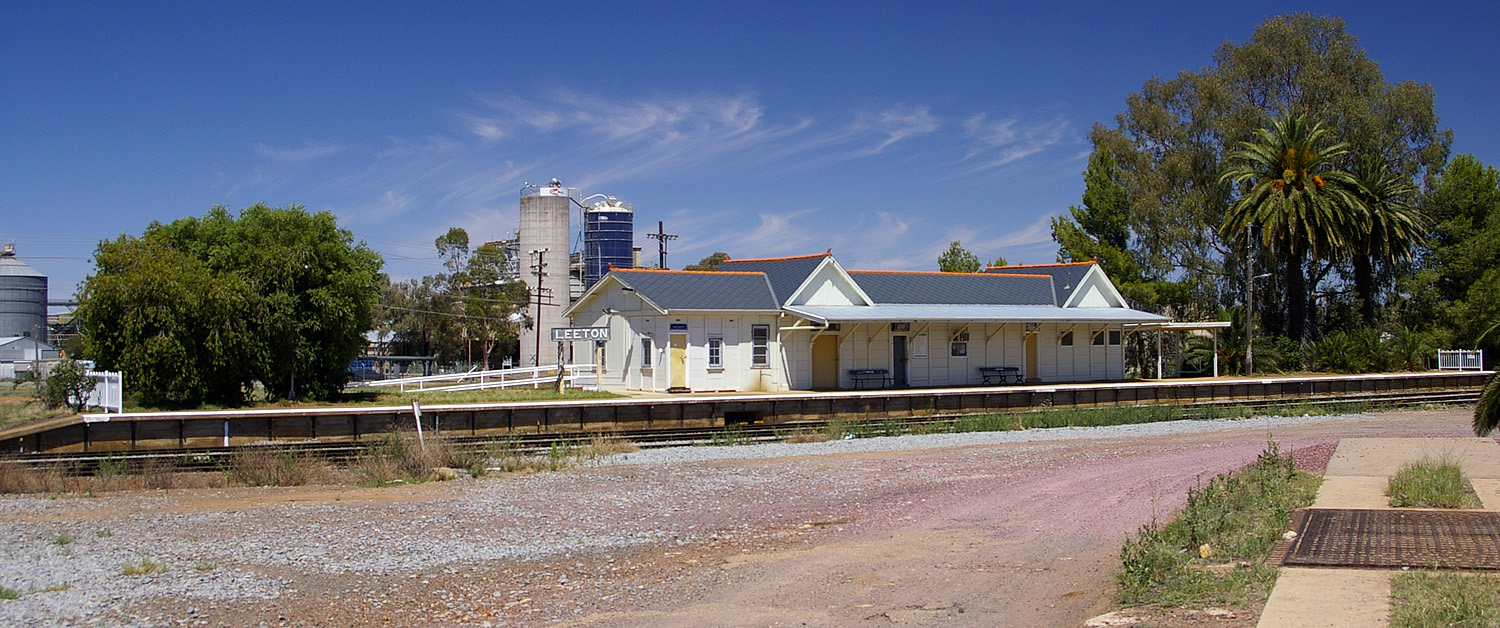
- Leeton railway station

Overview
- Termini: Yanco; Griffith

Technical
- Track gauge: 1,435 mm (4 ft 8 1/2 in) standard gauge

The Yanco to Griffith railway line is a railway line in New South Wales, Australia. Together with the Junee–Yanco section of the Hay railway line, it is one of two routes to the city of Griffith, the other route being via Temora. It branches from the Hay railway line at the town of Yanco and passes through the town of Leeton before reaching Griffith. The line is open to passenger trains – two weekly NSW TrainLink passenger service operates on Wednesday returning Thursday and Saturday returning Sunday. A passenger station remains open at Leeton.

== See also ==
- Rail transport in New South Wales
