= Griffith railway station =

Railway station in New South Wales, Australia

Griffith
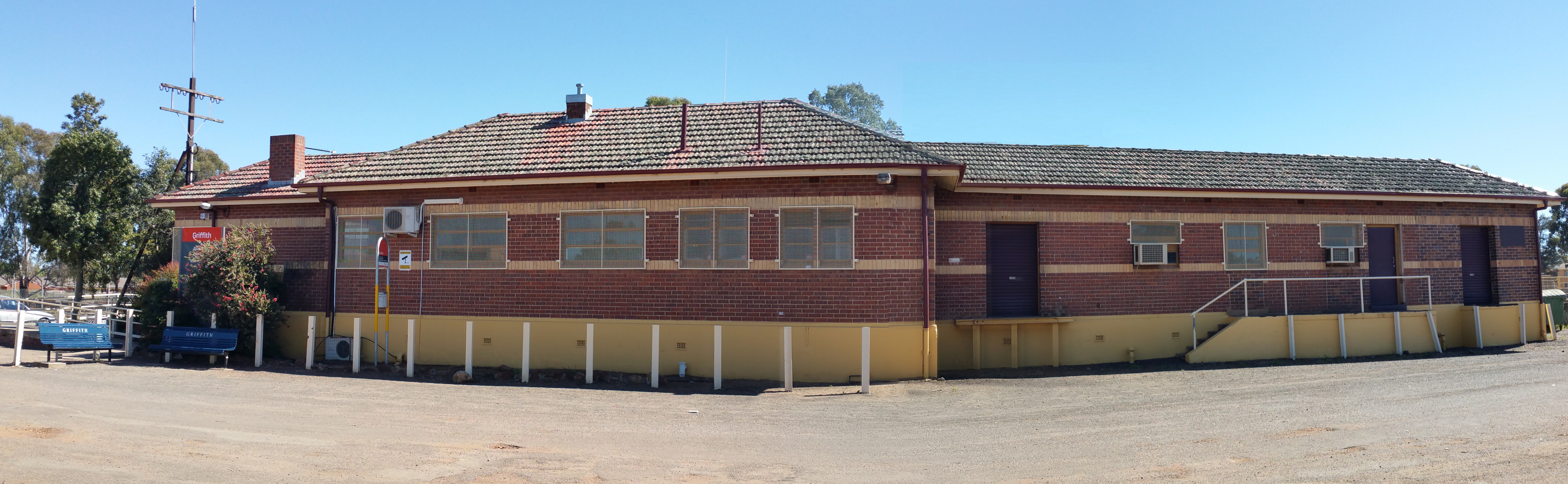
- Station building and entrance, October 2016

General information
- Location: Railway Street, Griffith
- Coordinates: 34°17′12″S 146°02′52″E
- Owner: Transport Asset Manager of New South Wales
- Operator: NSW TrainLink
- Lines: Yanco–Griffith; Temora–Roto
- Distance: 640.38 kilometres from Central
- Platforms: 2 (1 island)
- Tracks: 4

Construction
- Structure type: Ground
- Parking: Yes
- Accessible: Yes

Other information
- Station code: GFF

History
- Opened: 3 July 1916; 110 years ago

Services
Preceding station	NSW TrainLink	Following station
Terminus	NSW TrainLink Southern Line Griffith Xplorer	Leeton towards Sydney
Former services
Preceding station	Former services	Following station
Former NSW Branch line services
Lakeview towards Roto	Temora–Roto Line	Beelbangera towards Temora
Terminus	Griffith–Yanco Line	Yoogali towards Yanco
Location

Griffith railway station is located on the Yanco–Griffith line in New South Wales, Australia. It serves the city of Griffith.

== History ==
Griffith station opened on 3 July 1916 when the Temora-Roto line was extended from Barellan. It served as the terminus until the line was extended to Hillston on 18 June 1923. In 1928, it became a junction station when the Yanco–Griffith line opened from Yanco.

== Services ==
Griffith is the terminus for the twice weekly NSW TrainLink Xplorer from Sydney split from Canberra services at Goulburn. NSW TrainLink also operate a road coach service from Wagga Wagga to Griffith, while a Cootamundra to Mildura service also operates via Griffith.

Platform	Line	Stopping pattern	Notes
1	Southern Region	services to Goulburn and Sydney	

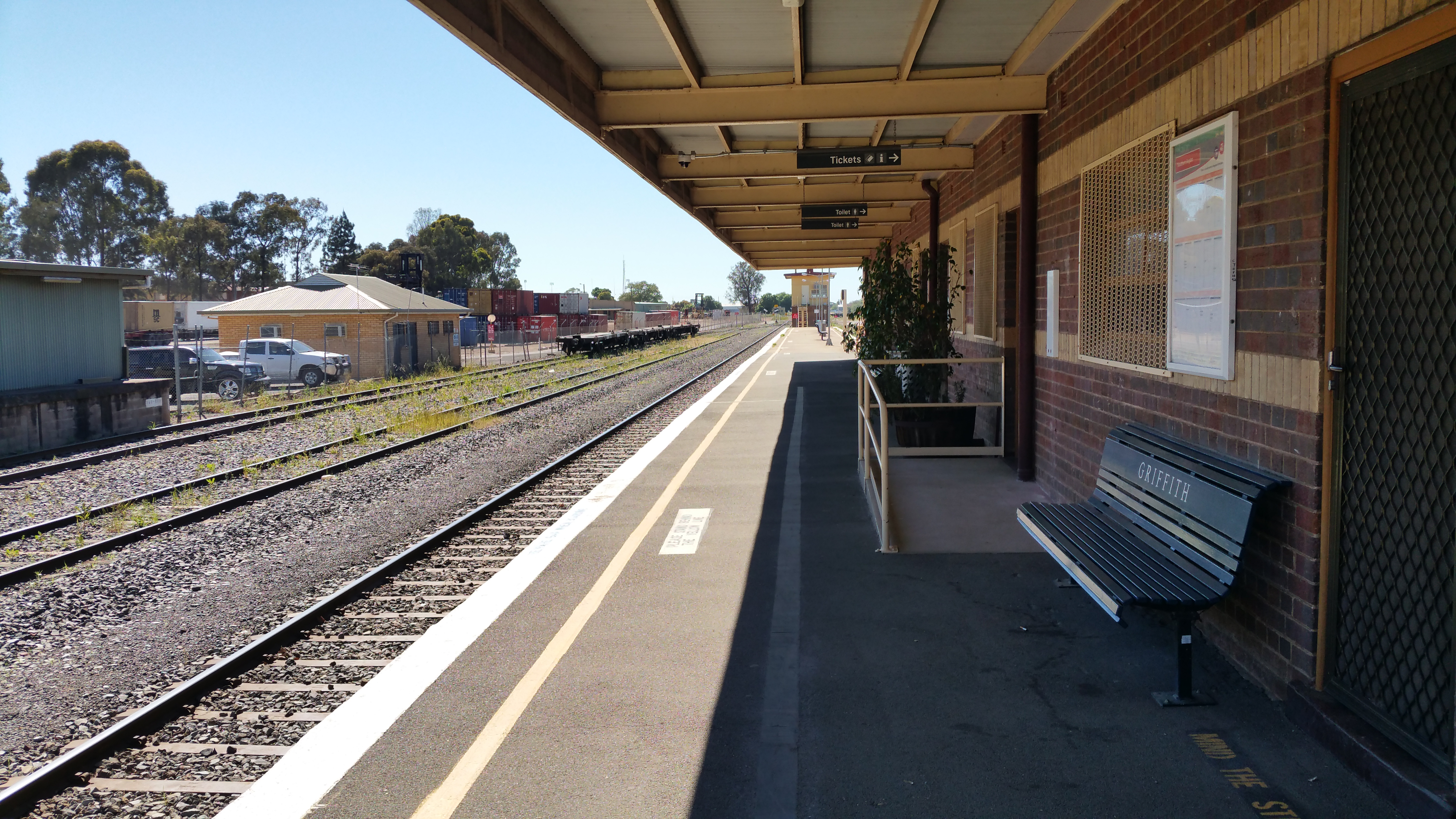
Southbound view on main platform

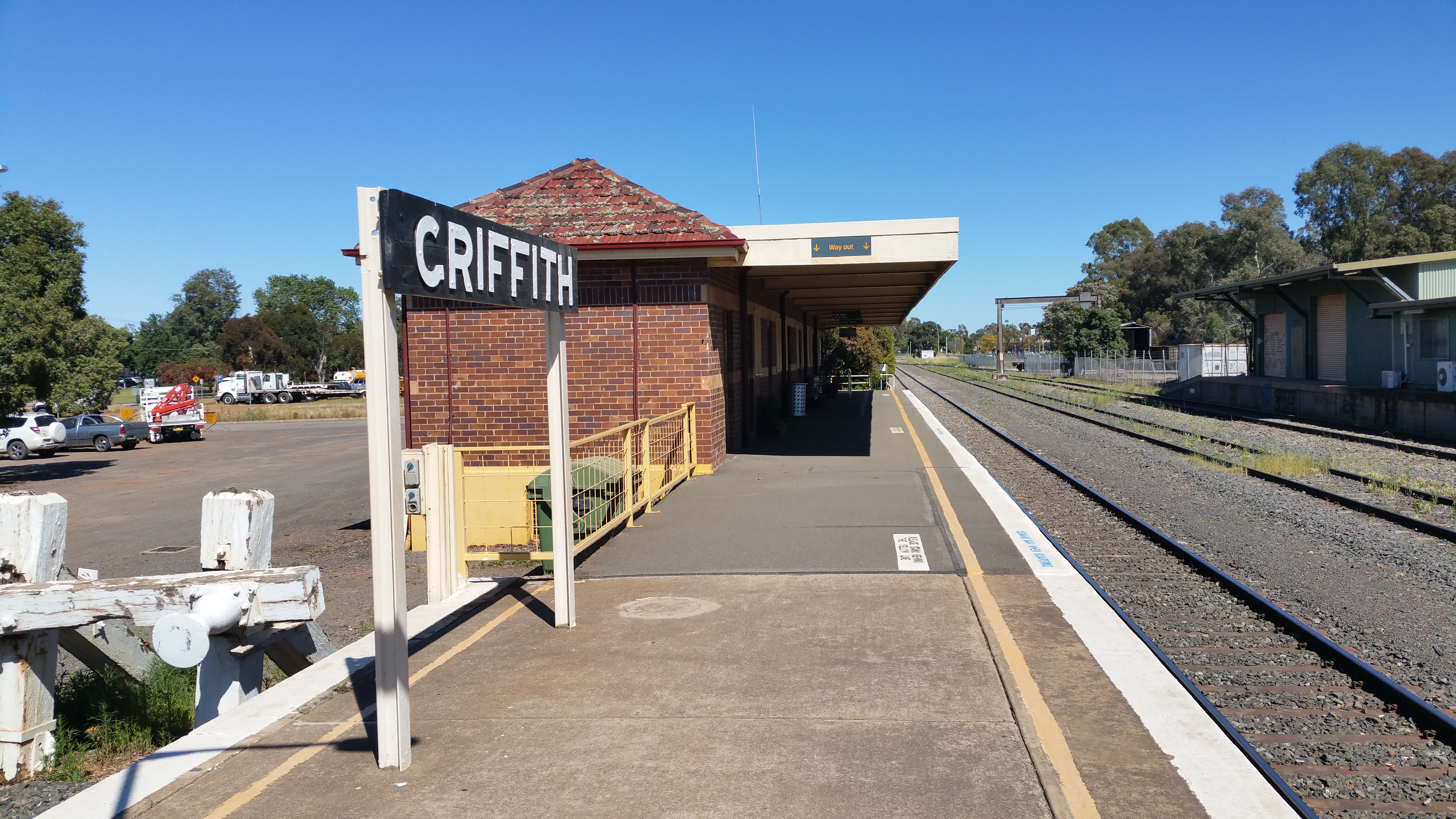
Northbound view

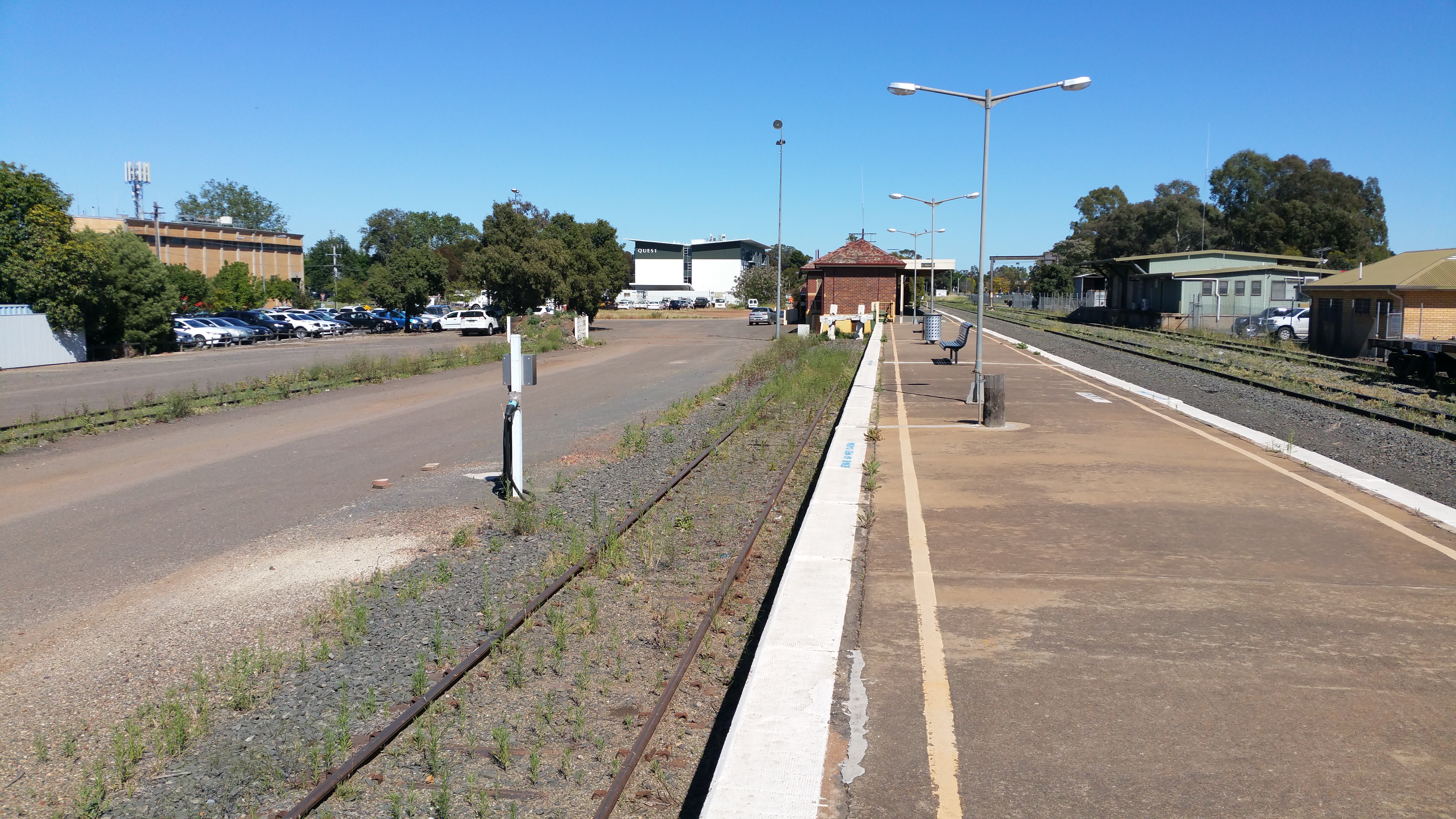
Terminating platform
