= Hay railway line =

New South Wales, Australia

Hay Line
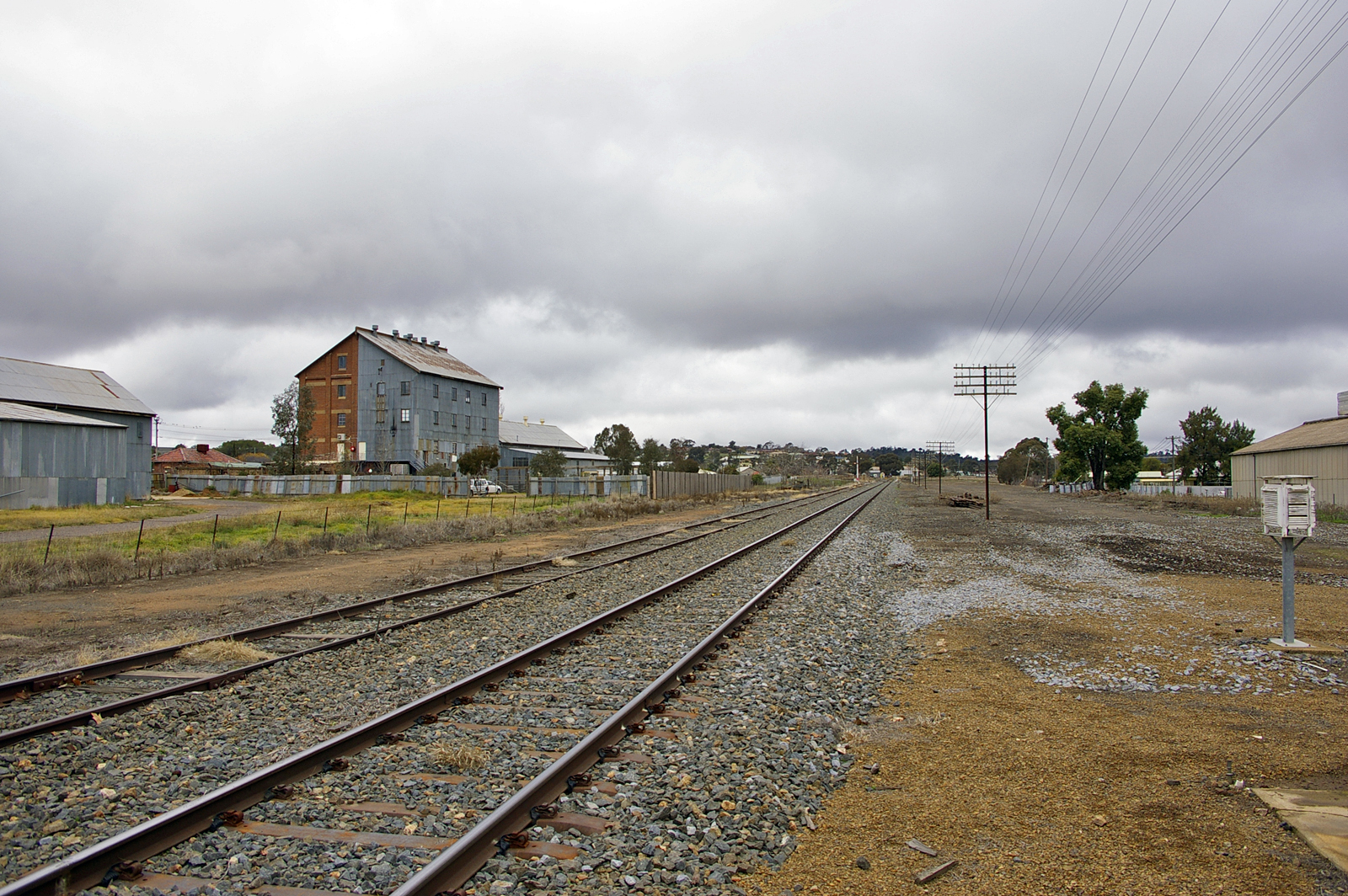
- Hay railway line at Junee, 2009

Overview
- Owner: Transport Asset Manager of New South Wales

Technical
- Track gauge: 1,435 mm (4 ft 8 1/2 in)

The Hay railway line is a partly non-operational railway line in New South Wales, Australia. The line branches from the Main South line at Junee, and passes in a westwards direction through the towns of Coolamon and Narrandera to Yanco. The first train arrived in Hay on 4 July 1882. The line beyond Yanco to Hay is now non-operational, although the section to Willbriggie remained open for grain haulage until 2004. At Yanco, the still-open Yanco to Griffith line branches off in a northwesterly direction to Griffith.

== Passenger services ==
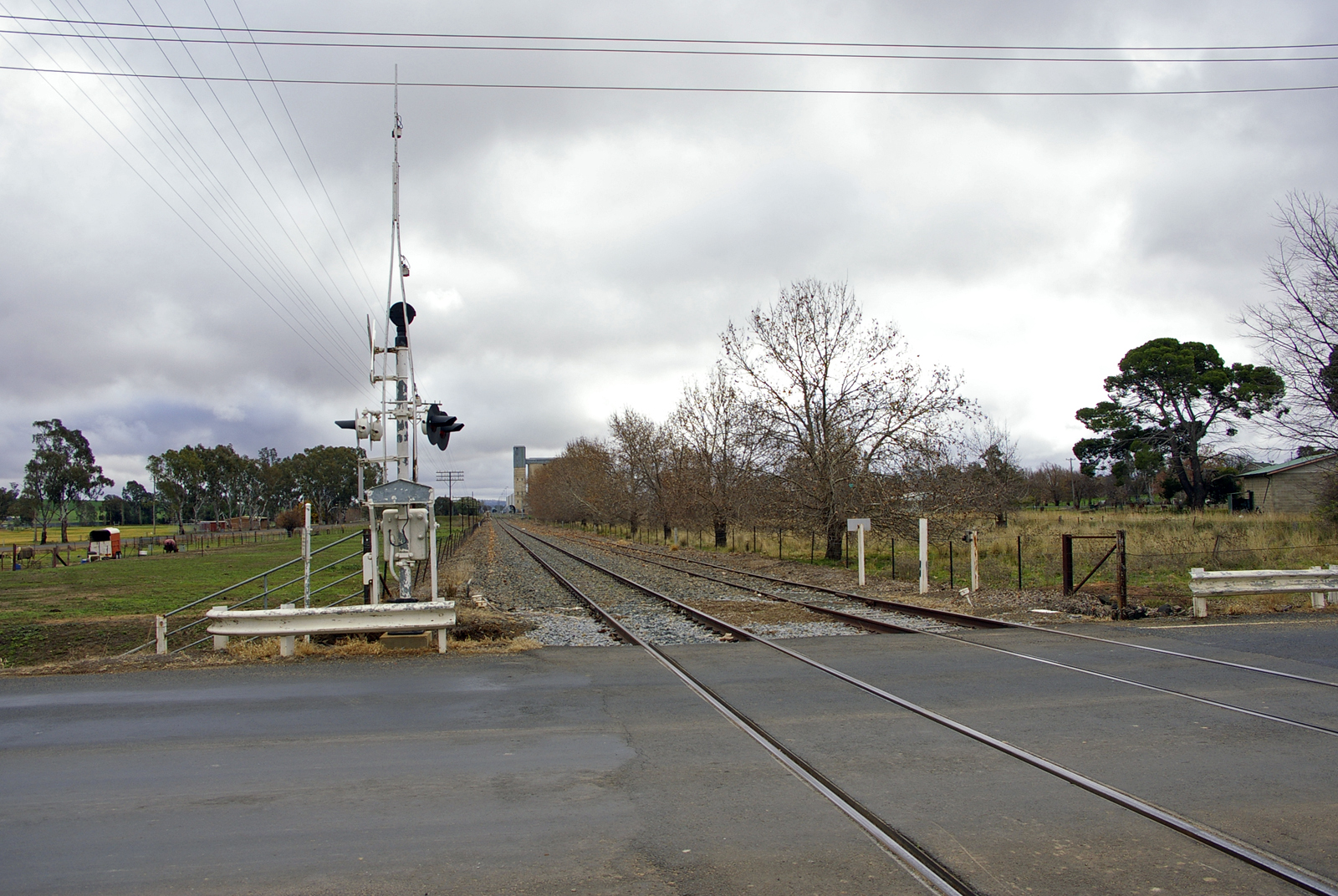
Hay branch line at Junee, 2009

Until 1986, passenger service operated over the section of line between Junee and Yanco on their way to Griffith, consisting of a through train to Sydney (the Riverina Express) on several days per week, with a connection service between Grifith and Junee (connecting with the South Mail) on the other days. A connecting railcar service was provided at Narrandera for passengers on the Tocumwal line operated three days per week, until withdrawn on Saturday 26 November 1983.

These services were withdrawn in 1986, and replaced by road coach services. Between 1986 and 1996, no passenger trains operated over the line until services were reintroduced in 1996 after considerable political pressure was placed upon the NSW State Government. A weekly locomotive train was initially reintroduced, subsequently replaced by a weekly Xplorer train. Railway stations remain open at Coolamon and Narrandera.

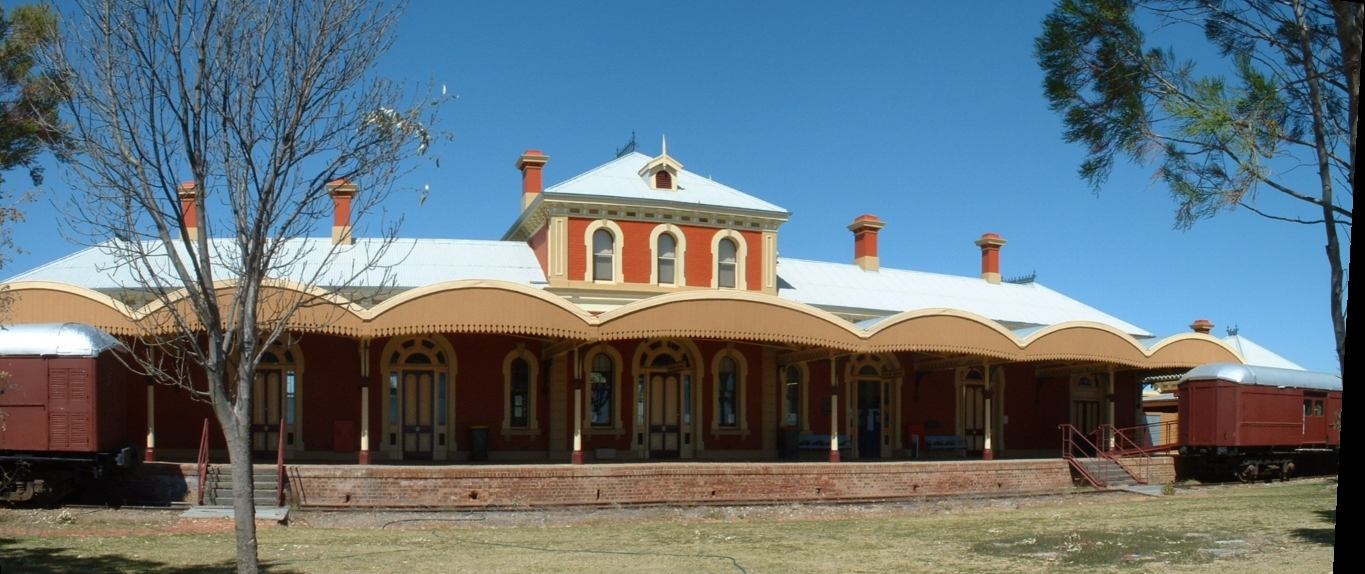
Hay Station panorama

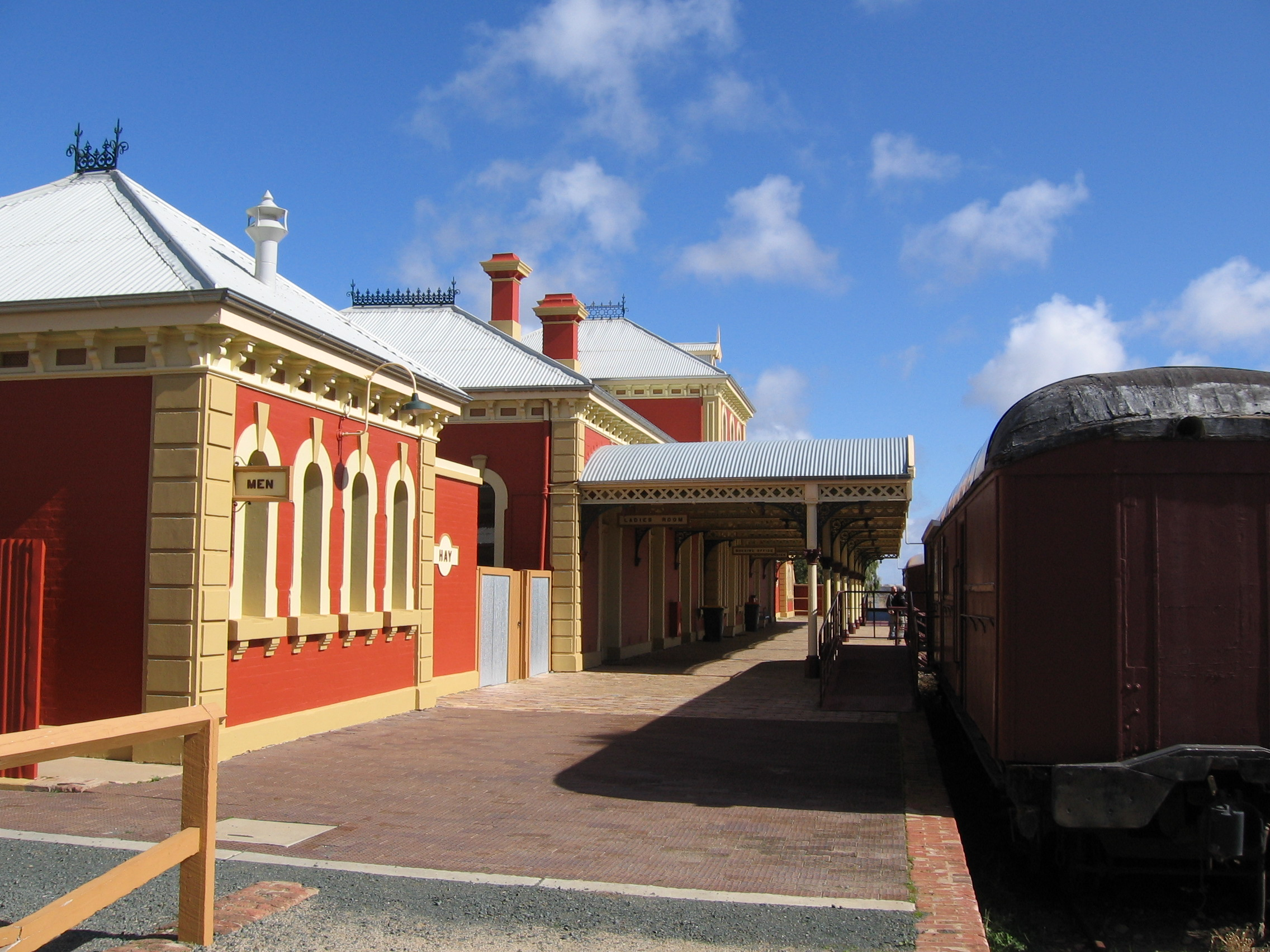
Hay Station Platform

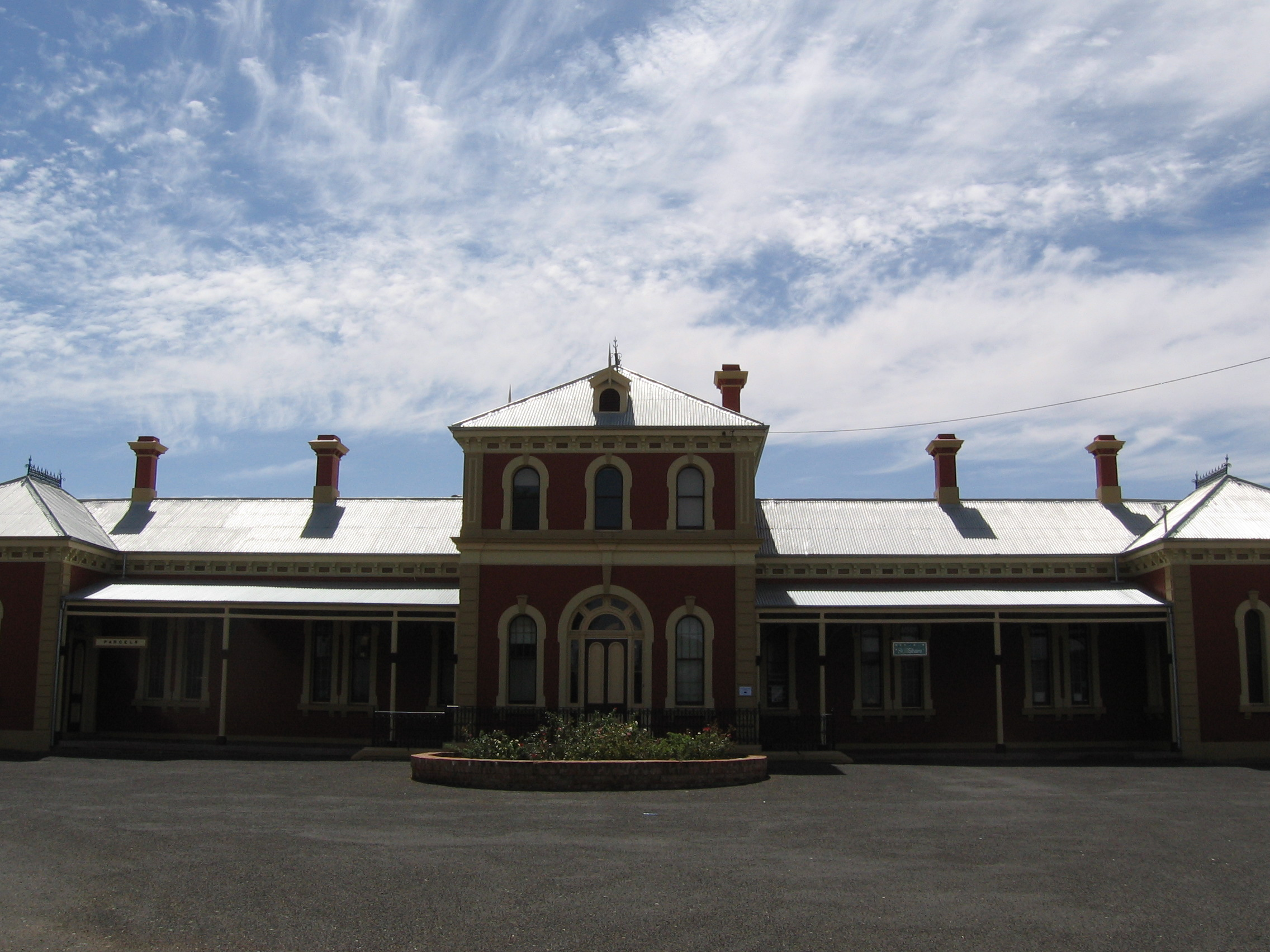
Hay Railway Station

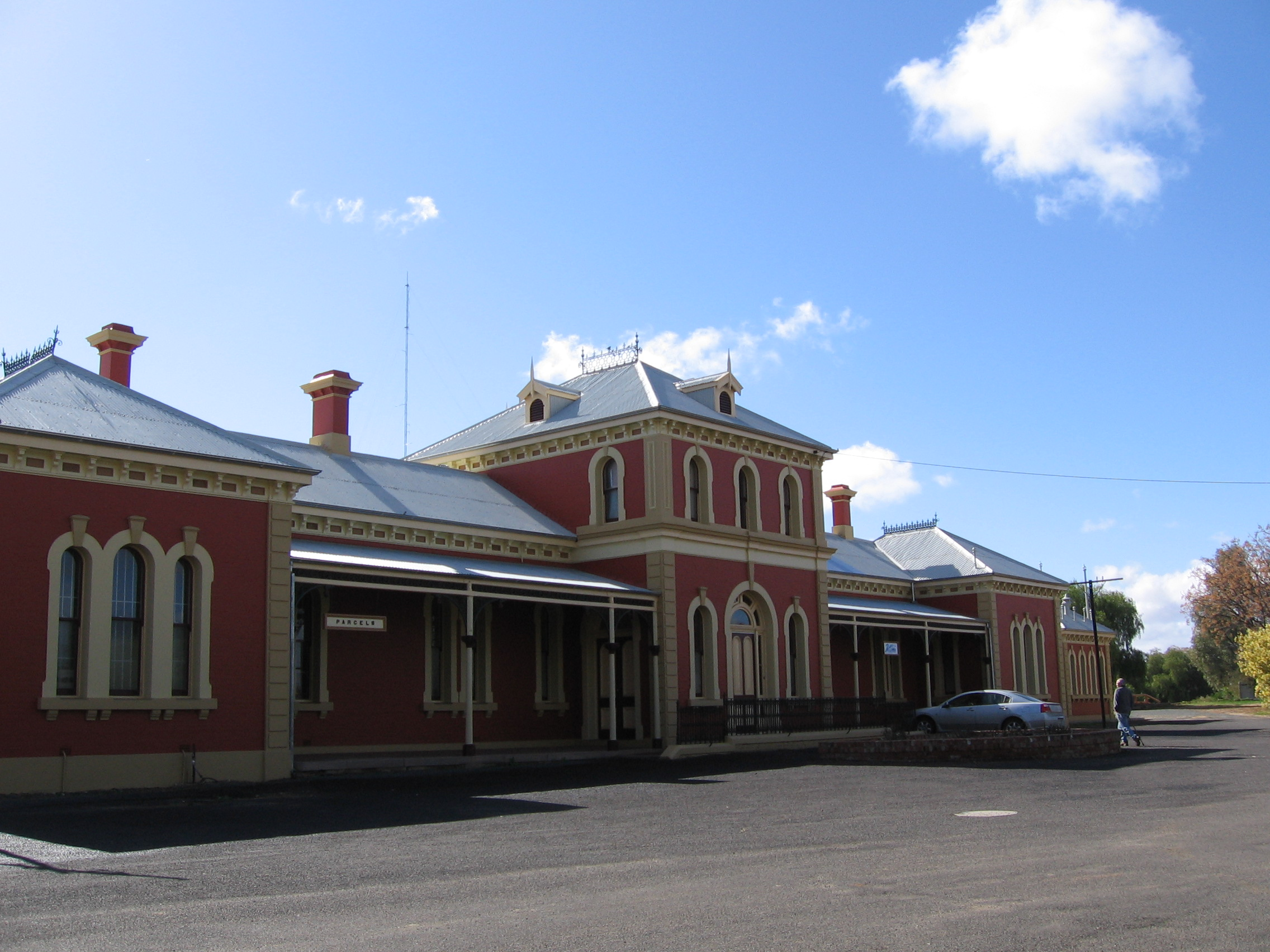
Hay Railway Station

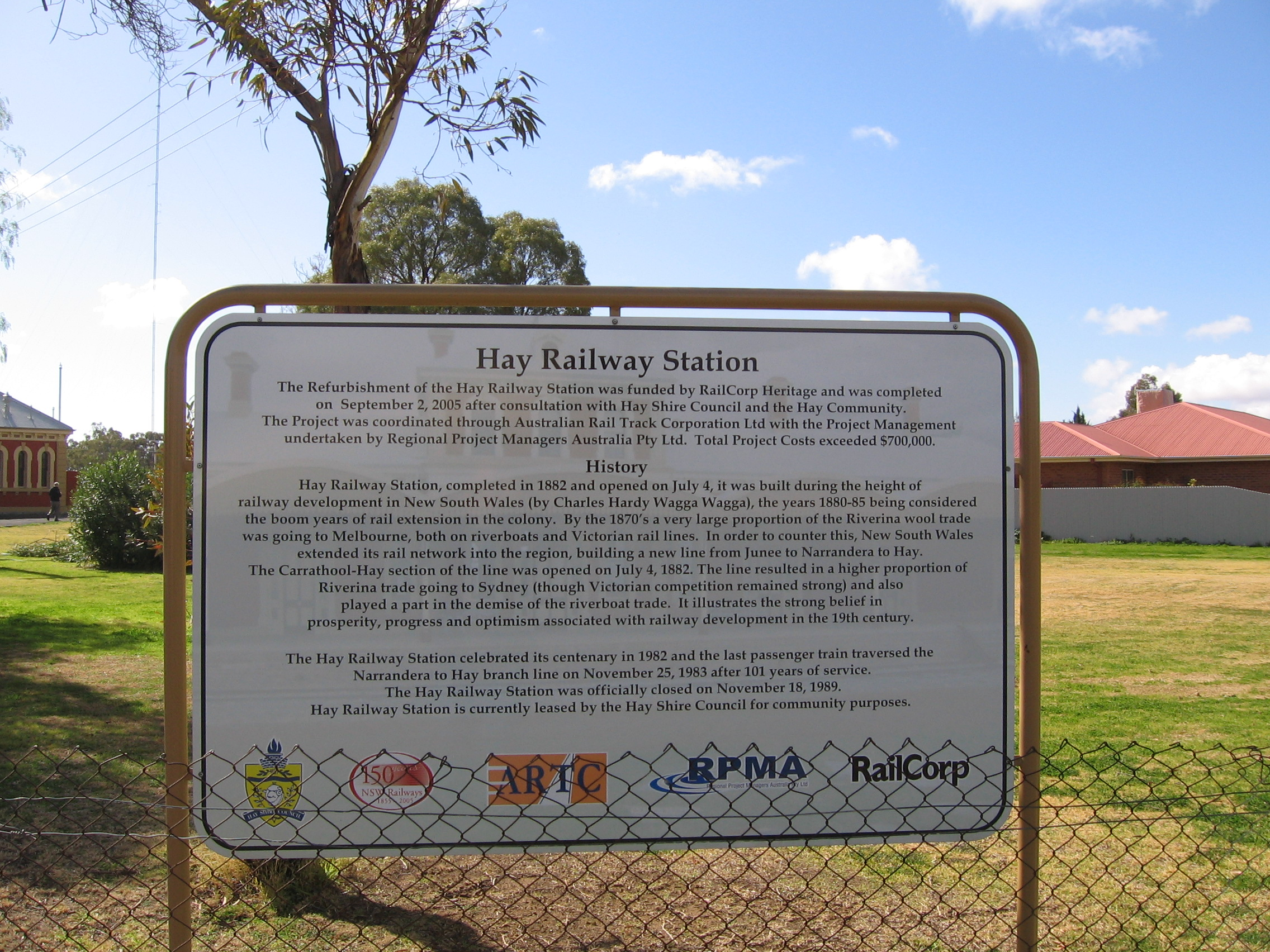
Hay Railway Station

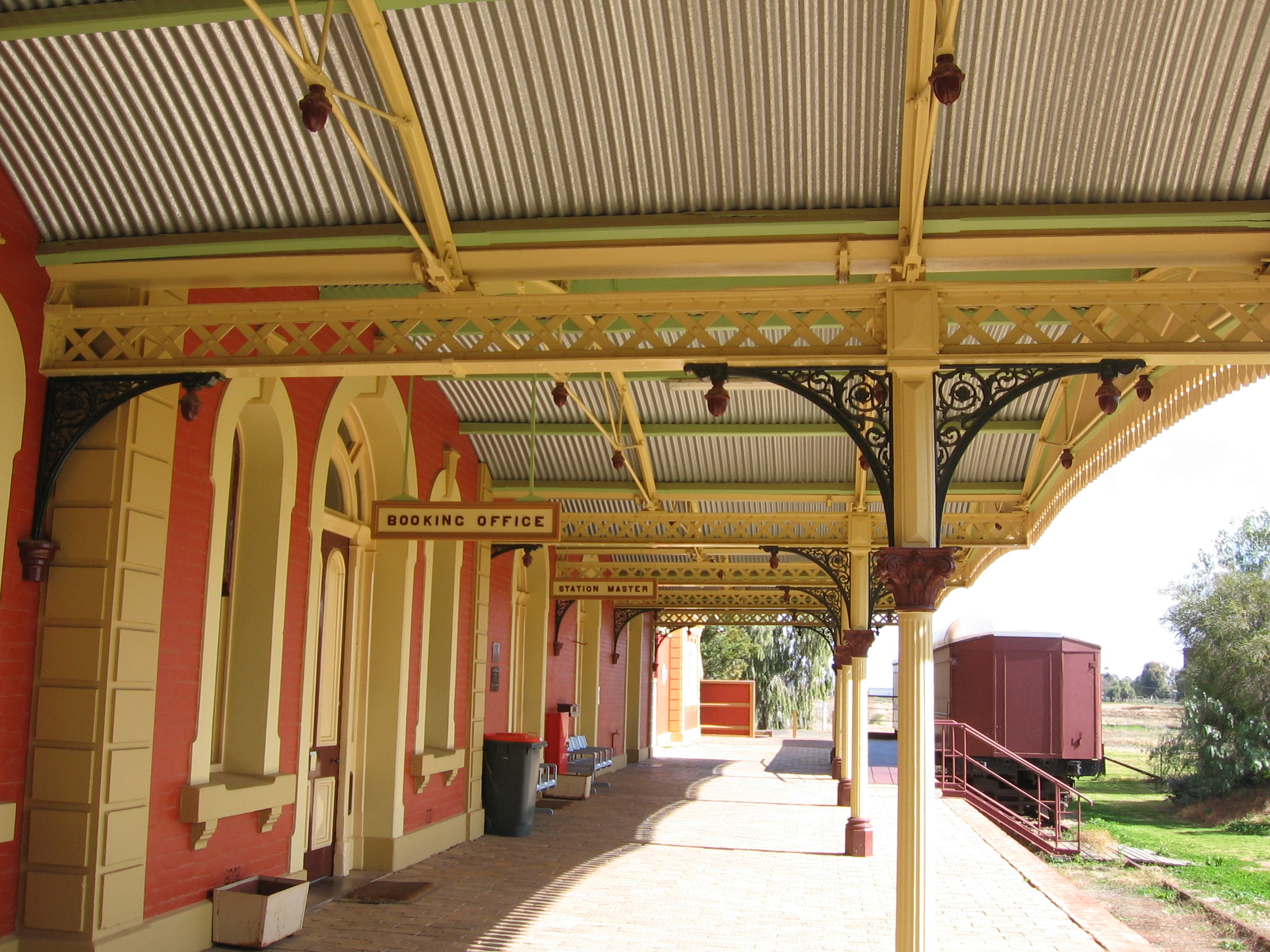
Hay Railway Station

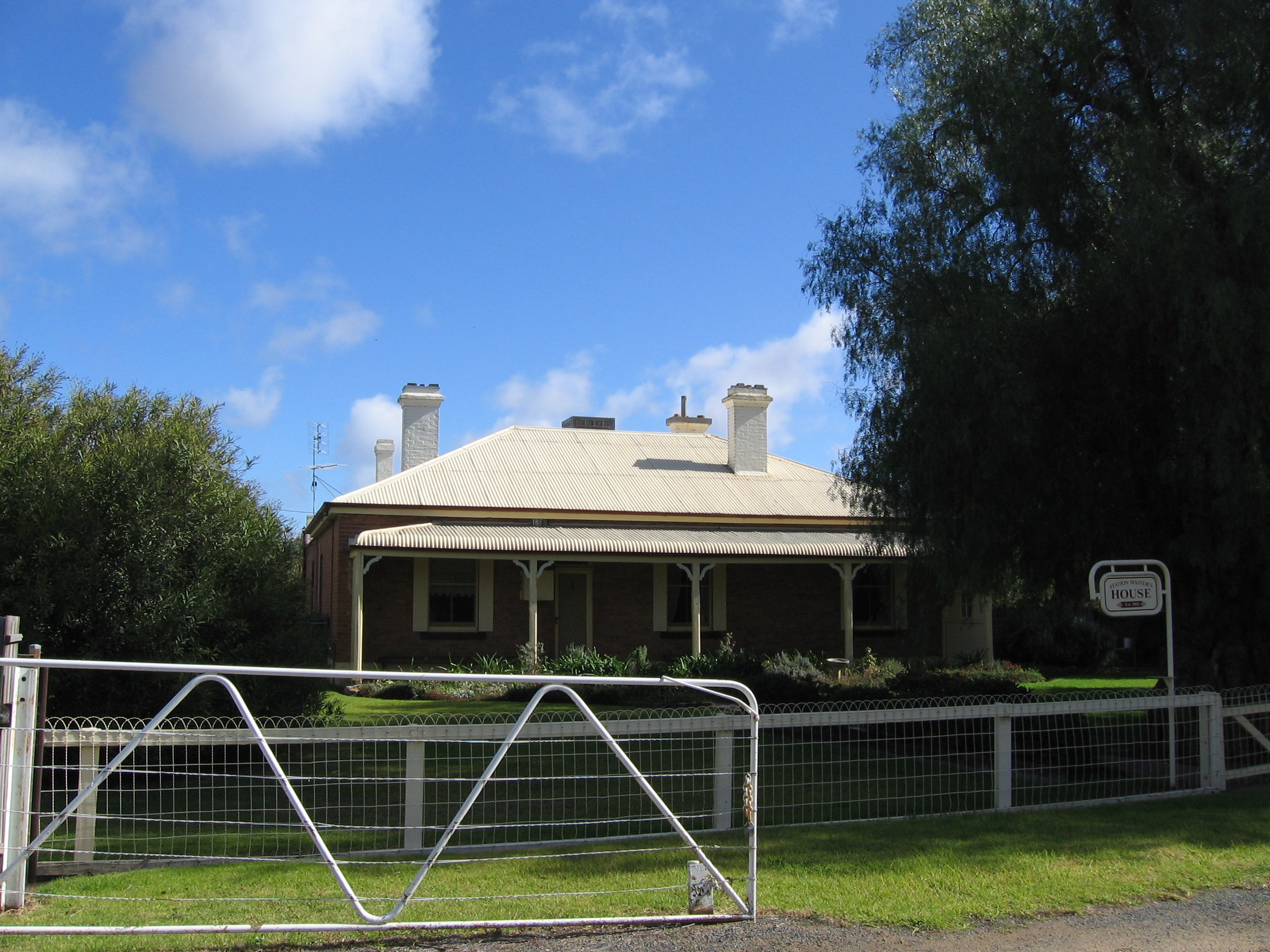
Hay Railway Station

== See also ==
- Rail transport in New South Wales
