= Hay railway station =

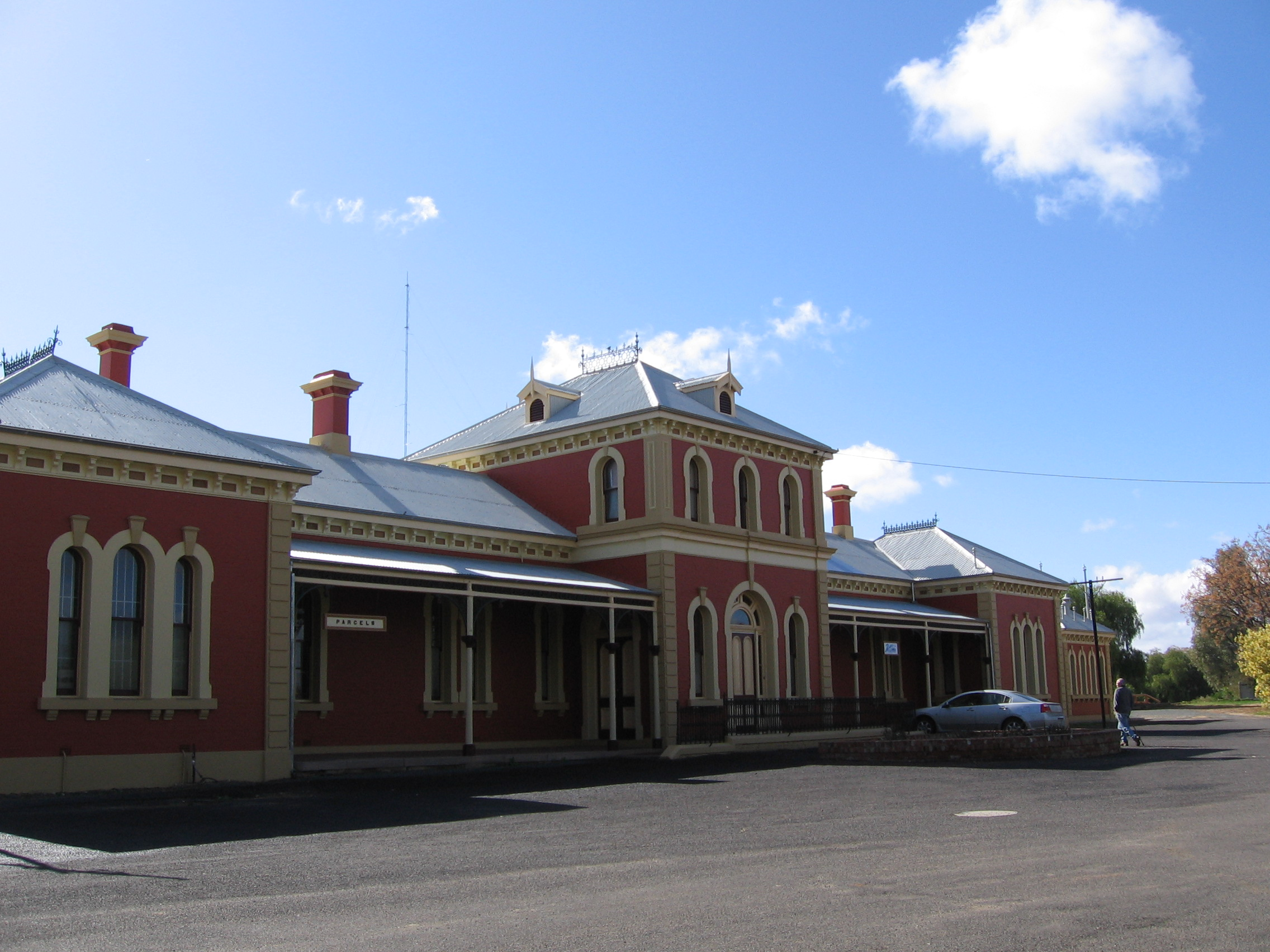

- Location within New South Wales Location within Australia
- 34.4994°S 144.8427°E
- Location: Hay railway line, Hay, Hay Shire, New South Wales, Australia

Site notes
- Owner: Transport Asset Manager of New South Wales

New South Wales Heritage Register
- Official name: Hay Railway Station and yard group
- Type: state heritage (complex / group)
- Designated: 2 April 1999
- Reference no.: 1167
- Type: Railway Platform / Station
- Category: Transport – Rail

Hay railway station is a heritage-listed railway station and the terminus of the partly-closed Hay railway line in New South Wales, Australia. The property was added to the New South Wales State Heritage Register on 2 April 1999.

== History ==
The station opened on 4 July 1882 and closed on 18 November 1989. The last passenger train through the station was on 25 November 1983.

The station was restored to its original heritage colours in 1992 and underwent restoration of the exterior roofing and paving of the platform in 2003–04.

The station building is now leased by the Hay Shire Council and houses the local community radio station, 2HAYFM, and the POW & Internment Camp Interpretive Centre – Dunera Museum. It formerly housed the Hay Employment Training Centre in the early 1990s.

== Description ==
The brick station building is a type 5 first class design with a brick platform dating from 1882. The corrugated iron goods shed is a through shed with awning 60 ft by 16 ft. The station complex also includes a timber framed rivetted steel tank made by Albion Engine Works at Pyrmont dating from 1881 and a jib crane.

The former stationmaster's residence is a brick residence of a type 3 design with a pyramid roof, located in Murray Street. It was sold c. 1994 and is no longer included in the station's heritage listing.

== Heritage listing ==
Hay is a very significant railway site in the State system. The station building reflects political developments between the States and interstate rivalries that resulted in the construction of a grand building at an important freight site. The whole complex indicates the importance of the site in the production of wool and the policy of shipping it to Sydney rather than through the southern states. The line was opened in response to an aggressive Victorian economic policy offering special rebates for shipping grain through Victoria. There was an unstated plan for the line to be extended to Adelaide through Hay and the scale of the building is evidence of this. The buildings are of very high quality with fine detailing and are among the most important structures in the State. It is the only first class station in the State not to be built on a main line or at a major junction which gives it added significance. All of the buildings and structures at Hay are of high significance and it is important that the site be retained as a whole.

Hay railway station was listed on the New South Wales State Heritage Register on 2 April 1999 having satisfied the following criteria.

The place possesses uncommon, rare or endangered aspects of the cultural or natural history of New South Wales.

This item is assessed as historically rare. This item is assessed as scientifically rare. This item is assessed as arch. rare. This item is assessed as socially rare.
