= Samuel McCaughey =

Australian pastoralist & politician

Sir Samuel McCaughey
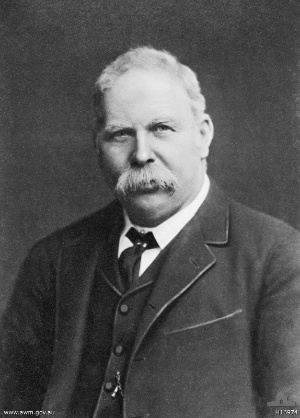
- Portrait of Sir Samuel McCaughey
- Born: 1 July 1835; Tullyneuh, Ireland
- Died: 25 July 1919 (aged 84); Yanco, New South Wales

Sir Samuel McCaughey (1 July 1835 – 25 July 1919) was an Irish-born pastoralist, politician and philanthropist in Australia.

== Early life ==
McCaughey was born on 1 July 1835 at Tullynewey, near Ballymena, Ireland, the son of Francis McCaughey, farmer and merchant, and his wife Eliza, née Wilson.

== Death and legacy ==
McCaughey died at Yanco on 25 July 1919.

He was a philanthropist; he donated £10,000 to the Dreadnought Fund, £10,000 to Dr Barnardo's Homes, gave liberally to the Red Cross and other war charities besides insuring 500 soldiers at £200 each.

After his death, his estate was sworn for probate at over £1,600,000. Apart from bequests of £200,000 and all his motor vehicles to his brother John and legacies to his station managers and employees, he left £10,000 to increase the stipends of Presbyterian clergy, £20,000 to the Burnside Orphan Homes at Parramatta, £20,000 to Scots College in Sydney, £10,000 each to five other independent schools (Newington College, Sydney Church of England Grammar School, Sydney Grammar School, Cranbrook School, Sydney and The King's School, Parramatta), £5000 to the Salvation Army and £5000 each to seven hospitals.

Half the residue of his estate went to the University of Sydney (£458,000 from which nine chairs were created, including the McCaughey Chair of French) and to the University of Queensland. The other half went to the relief of members of the Australian Military and Naval Expeditionary Forces and their widows and children.

His portrait by John Longstaff is in the Great Hall of the University of Sydney.

=== Yanco Agricultural High School ===
One of the schools which directly bears his legacy is Yanco Agricultural High School, located near Leeton, New South Wales. This school was founded around a building built by McCaughey to host The Duke of York during a planned visit to Australia. A life-size portrait of McCaughey is in the entry to this building.

=== McCaughey Chair of French ===
The following professors occupied this chair at Sydney University:

- George Gibb Nicholson, 1921–45
- Ian Allan Ramie Henning, 1945–70
- Leigh Ross Chambers, 1971–75
- Ian Peter Barko, 1976–90
- Angus Andrews Martin, 1992–99
- Margaret Sankey, 2003-

== Family ==
His brother John, also a pastoralist, has an art prize in his name: the John McCaughey Memorial Art Prize was set up by his widow Mona in 1957.
