= Ian Henning =

Professor of French

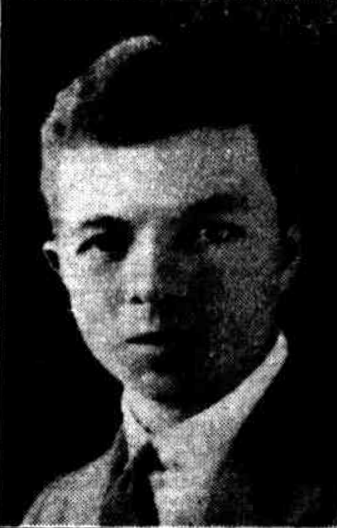
- Ian Henning
- Born: 14 June 1905; Waverley, New South Wales, Australia
- Died: October 6, 1975 (aged 70); Sydney, Australia
- Occupation: Academic

Academic work
- Discipline: French studies
- Notable works: L'Allemagne de Madame de Staël et la polémique romantique

Ian Henning (1905–1975) was the second McCaughey Professor of French at the University of Sydney.

== Early life and education ==
Henning was born Ian Allan Ramie Henning on 14 June 1905 in Waverley, New South Wales. His parents were Henry Herbert, an inventor, and Amy Ethel (née Stacey) Henning.

Ian Henning studied successively at Bondi Superior Public School, Chatswood Primary School and Sydney Boys’ High School. Completing his Leaving Certificate in 1922, he won a Lithgow Scholarship No. 1 for proficiency in French and German and enrolled in the Faculty of Arts at the University of Sydney in the following year.

He studied French under Professor G. G. Nicholson and Gladys Marks, and German under the Australian poet, scholar and literary critic Christopher Brennan.

In 1926 he was awarded a French Government scholarship and travelled to Paris to undertake postgraduate studies at the Sorbonne. His thesis, supervised by Fernand Baldensperger, was on De l'Allemagne by Madame de Staël. Having completed a Doctorat de l’Université de Paris (with a mention très honorable). The thesis was published in 1929 by the Librairie Ancienne Honoré Champion.

== Academic career ==
Returning to Australia in 1929, Henning worked for one year as acting lecturer in French at the University of Sydney. When that post came to an end, he applied for a lectureship in French at the Victoria University College, Wellington, New Zealand.

He resigned after two years and returned to Australia to experience a "period of stagnation and contraction during the Depression years", during which he survived by working on several occasions as an acting lecturer in French at the University of Sydney. In December 1945 Henning was appointed as the McCaughey Chair of French, which Professor G. G. Nicholson had vacated after many years in that position.

During the 1950s Henning would periodically take his French teaching to the wider Australian public outside the university walls, such as by offering lectures on French poetry at The Poetry Society and on "aspects of modern language teaching" to the N.S.W. Association of University Women Graduates and staging a "well balanced" production of Giraudoux's The Trojan War Will Not Take Place.

He retired in December 1970. He was succeeded in the McCaughey Chair by Ross Chambers.

== Legacy ==
Henning found himself professor at a time of "huge expansion of student and staff numbers" in Sydney University's French department. Kenneth Dutton has argued that Henning, although being shy and apparently aloof, was a "full of genuine concern for his students" who formed an entire generation of French scholars", many of whom would later occupy senior positions in universities "in Australia and overseas".

Henning is regarded by some as a "clone" of his predecessor, Professor Nicholson. Dutton has claimed that, although Henning continued to insist on translation of a major component of French studies, he did not (unlike Nicholson) see it as a "mental discipline" in which precise expression would lead to precision in thought. For Henning, it was an "exercise in understanding, highlighting through the consideration of various possible translations the very difficulty (...) of expressing ‘exactly’ in one language what has been written in another. While strongly supporting the "end role" of language teaching as the appreciation of great literature, he "believed that such understanding could be based only on mastery of the nuances of the language itself".

== Personal life ==
On 8 November 1946 Henning married Patricia ("Pat") Anne Massie. They had two sons, Robert (born 1949) and Christopher (born 1954).

Henning died on 6 October 1975.

== Selected bibliography ==
=== Books ===
- L'Allemagne de Madame de Staël et la polémique romantique: première fortune de l'ouvrage en France et en Allemagne (1814-1830), Paris: Librairie Ancienne Honoré Champion, 1929.

=== Articles ===
- "George Gibb Nicholson", Union Recorder, Vol. XXIV, No. 2, 17 March 1949, p. 3.
