= Alan Rowland Chisholm =

Australian academic and professor

Alan Rowland Chisholm FAHA
- Born: 6 November 1888; Bathurst, New South Wales, Australia
- Died: 9 September 1981 (aged 92); Melbourne, Australia
- Occupation: Academic
- Writing career
- Notable works: The Art of Arthur Rimbaud; Towards Hérodiade. A Literary Genealogy; An Approach to M. Valéry's Jeune Parque; Men Were My Milestones; Mallarmé's Grand Œuvre

Alan Rowland Chisholm FAHA (1888–1981), often referred to as A. R. Chisholm, was a distinguished professor of French, critic and memorialist. During the more than three decades he spent at the University of Melbourne, the French "program became a world-renowned centre of scholarship in French literature". He was an expert in French symbolist poetry, particularly that of Stéphane Mallarmé.

== Early life and education ==
Alan Rowland Chisholm was born in Bathurst, New South Wales on 6 November 1888. His parents were William Samuel Chisholm, a coach painter, and Eliza, née Heagren.

When his family moved to Sydney, he attended school at public schools in Milsons Point and North Sydney and then from 1905 to 1907 at Fort Street Model School, where he studied French and Latin.

He attended the University of Sydney, where he studied French, under George Gibb Nicholson, and Latin, graduating in 1911 with first class honours in French. He also won the 1911 Frederick Lloyd Memorial Prize for a Latin essay on a specified subject.

After teaching at Fort Street and Glen Innes, he obtained a scholarship which enabled him to travel to Germany in 1912 and study German at the Institut Tilly in Berlin. In 1913 he moved to Paris, where he attended the lectures of Gustave Lanson and was awarded International Phonetic Association certificates of proficiency in the phonetics of French and German.

In 1914 he returned to Sydney and was appointed lecturer in modern languages at the Sydney Teachers' College.

When World War I broke out, Chisholm enlisted in the Australian Imperial Force in December 1915. He served on the Western Front in the "Australian Wireless Section (Corps Signals) to act as interpreter on Front Line listening posts for detection of German telephone work by means of listening set". He was demobilised in October 1919.

Returning to the Sydney Teachers' College, he founded the Modern Language Review of New South Wales.

His friend Christopher Brennan, the Australian poet and scholar, alerted him in 1919 to the links between German romanticism and French symbolism, which led to his lifelong interest in the poetry of the French symbolist poet Stéphane Mallarmé.

== University of Melbourne ==
In 1921 Chisholm was appointed as lecturer in charge of French at the University of Melbourne where he was to spend the rest of his career. Two years later he became a senior lecturer.

He introduced several major changes in the university's French courses:

Almost from the start he promoted philological, medieval and Renaissance studies, as well as classical and nineteenth-century French literature, and pioneered the teaching of modern and contemporary authors. The historical bias was redressed by various 'special studies' that were critical, aesthetic and philosophical.

He taught honours German courses during fellow modern languages academic Associate Professor Augustin Lodewyckx's sabbaticals in 1924, 1931 and 1937.

In 1930 he published "his pioneer study" The Art of Arthur Rimbaud.

In the same year he was appointed associate professor in French at the University of Melbourne and in 1938 he was promoted to professor of French.

After extensive study of the works of Schopenhauer, Nietzsche, Jules de Gaultier and Fritz Strich, Chisholm wrote Towards Hérodiade (1934), an "important and influential" work on Mallarmé's place in the world of "nineteenth century ideas and sensibility".

In 1938 he published his "sensitive and penetrating essay on the lengthy poem by Paul Valéry entitled "Le Jeune Parque". The essay, An Approach to M. Valéry's 'Jeune Parque', was honoured by the following gratifying comment by Valéry himself: "vous m'avez lu très attentivement" [you have read me very attentively].

During World War II he espoused the cause of Free French and Italia Libera and published numerous articles in the Melbourne Argus newspaper calling for support for France.

In the 1940s and 1950s Chisholm gave a series of "spellbinding" lectures on Baudelaire, Mallarmé and Valéry.

His French department became known in Europe as the "a 'Melbourne School' of scrupulous Mallarméan exegesis". According to Bertrand Marchal, "L'université de Melbourne, au temps du professeur Chisholm, fut un véritable vivier des études mallarméennes, et de Christophe Brennan à Lloyd James Austin, l'Australie peut revendiquer le titre de deuxième patrie de Mallarmé." [the University of Melbourne in the time of Professor Chisholm was a veritable breeding ground of Mallarméan studies, and from Christopher Brennan to Lloyd James Austin, Australia can claim to be the second homeland of Mallarmé.]

More broadly, "the 'Melbourne school', as it came to be known the world over, became a byword for outstanding published contributions to the study of 19th and 20th century French poetry, especially Baudelaire, Mallarmé and Valéry."

While at Melbourne University Chisholm taught and "formed" many distinguished French scholars, some of whom (including James Lawler) went on to professorial chairs in the United States and others (including Lloyd Austin) to chairs in the United Kingdom.

Lloyd Austin described his personality and influence as follows:

His gentle, friendly personality won him the deep affection of many of his students; his great generosity in appreciation endeared him to younger scholars; the originality and authority of his thought and the elegance and precision of his writing earned him high esteem from junior and senior colleagues alike throughout the world.

In 1950 he was one of the main forces behind the founding of the Australasian Universities Modern Language Association (since 1957 known as the Australasian Universities Languages and Literature Association, or AULLA in short).

== Retirement ==
Chisholm retired in 1956 after a career of 35 years at the University of Melbourne and entered a "new and fruitful period of research". He took the opportunity to revisit Europe and in following years edited works by the Australian poets John Shaw Neilson and Christopher Brennan, wrote articles on French poetry that were published in academic journals, wrote reviews for Melbourne's The Age newspaper, and wrote fine poems (some of which were not published but known to his friends).

In 1956 he became one of the Foundation Members of the Australian Humanities Research Council and in 1969 became one of the Foundation Fellows of the Australian Academy of the Humanities.

He wrote two autobiographies, Men Were My Milestones (1958) and The Familiar Presence (1966). He published Mallarmé's Grand Oeuvre (1962), a work of synthesis based in part on the many articles and reviews he had published on the poet over the years.

He died on 9 September 1981 at the age of ninety-two years at Armadale, Melbourne.

== Legacy ==
In addition to greatly improving the quality of teaching and research in Melbourne University's French department, it was Chisholm's "special achievement ... to raise French studies here [in Australia] (until then, barely tolerated, along with German and English, by hard-line classicists) to the status of a highly relevant and authentic academic discipline".

His creation of a department widely known for its "vitality and wide scholarly coverage" was based on "the conviction, on the one hand, that a foreign language was a living thing, to be both spoken and written by students, and on the other hand that literature was par excellence the highway to the study of man."

== Personal life ==
In 1915 Chisolm married Laurel May Genge (1888-1977). They had one son, John Angus (1916–1978), and divorced in September 1923. In November of the same year he married Lillian Norah Mulholland (died 1968) and they had one daughter, Amélie ("Mimi") Madeline Alice (1924–2009).

== Awards and honours ==
- Officier de la Légion d'Honneur (1951)
- Order of the British Empire (1961)
- Honorary D.Litt. (Monash University, 1971)
- Cavaliere of the Order of Merit of the Republic of Italy

== Bibliography ==
- The art of Arthur Rimbaud. Melbourne University Press in association with Macmillan & Co. 1930.
- Towards Hérodiade. A Literary Genealogy (Melbourne University Press in association with Oxford University Press, 1934; New York, AMS Press, 1979)
- An Approach to M. Valéry's Jeune Parque (Melbourne University Press, 1938)
- Mallarmé's L'après-midi d'un faune: An Exegetical and Critical Study (Melbourne University Press on behalf of the Australian Humanities Research Council, 1958; in French translation: Brussels, J. Antoine, 1974)
- Men Were My Milestones: Australian Portraits and Sketches (Melbourne University Press, 1958)
- Mallarmé's Grand Œuvre (Manchester University Press, 1962)
- "Remembrance of things past 12) : a pint of sherry with Hilaire Belloc". Meanjin Quarterly. 24 (1): 116–119. March 1965.
- The Familiar Presence and Other Reminiscences (Melbourne University Press, 1966)

As editor

- Chateaubriand: Atala (London: J. M. Dent, 1932)
- Gautier: Le capitaine Fracasse (London: J. M. Dent, 1932)
- Light out of France: French Contributions to Civilization (Sydney and London: Angus & Robertson, 1951). Co-edited with John G. Stanbury
- Thirty French Poems with Comments (Sydney: Angus and Robertson, 1957)
- The Verse of Christopher Brennan (Sydney: Angus & Robertson, 1963). Co-edited with J. J. Quinn
- Selected Poems of Christopher Brennan (Sydney: Angus & Robertson, 1966)
- The Poems of Shaw Neilson (Sydney: Angus & Robertson, 1973)
