= Lloyd James Austin =

Australian linguist and literary scholar

Lloyd Austin
- Austin in 1968
- Born: 4 November 1915; Melbourne, Australia
- Died: 30 December 1994 (aged 79); Cambridge
- Education: University of Melbourne
- Occupations: Linguist and literary critic

Lloyd James Austin FBA (4 November 1915 – 30 December 1994) was an Australian linguist and literary scholar, who worked in Great Britain as a university teacher.

== Life and work ==
Lloyd Austin studied at the University of Melbourne under Alan Rowland Chisholm and, with a French Government scholarship, at the University of Paris from 1937 under the supervision of Maurice Levaillant. There on 3 April 1940 he presented his doctorate entitled Paul Bourget: sa vie et son œuvre jusqu'en 1889 (Paris: Librairie E. Droz, 1940), setting out for Australia shortly thereafter with his French wife, a graduate in English from the Sorbonne, on one of the last boats to leave France. He taught first of all in a school in Melbourne, served in the war from 1942 to 1945 and after the war was appointed to a lectureship at the University of St Andrews in Scotland. In the early 1950s he spent an extended period of research in Paris, taking up a position in 1956 as Professor of Modern French Literature at the University of Manchester in succession to Percy Mansell Jones (1889–1968). In 1961 he moved to Cambridge and in 1967 succeeded Lewis Charles Harmer to the Drapers Chair of French, at the University of Cambridge.

He served as General Editor of French Studies from 1967 to 1980.

From 1980 Austin succeeded Eugène Vinaver as foreign member of the Académie royale de langue et de littérature françaises de Belgique He in turn was succeeded by Robert Darnton.

He married Jeanne-Françoise Guérin in 1939 and they had three sons (including the photographer James Austin and the scholar of ancient Greek Colin Austin) and one daughter.

== Other works ==
- L'Univers poétique de Baudelaire. Symbolisme et symbolique, Paris: Mercure de France, 1956
- (ed. with Henri Mondor) Correspondance de Mallarmé, 11 vols., Paris: Gallimard, 1959–1985
- (ed. with Garnet Rees and Eugène Vinaver) Studies in modern French literature presented to P. Mansell Jones by pupils, colleagues and friends, Manchester: Manchester University Press, 1961
- (ed. with Henri Mondor) Les « Gossips » de Mallarmé: « Athenaeum » 1875–1876, Paris: Gallimard, 1962
- Poetic Principles and Practice: Occasional Papers on Baudelaire, Mallarmé and Valéry, Cambridge: Cambridge University Press, 1987 ISBN 978-0-521-32737-4
- (ed.) Poésies de Stéphane Mallarmé, Paris: Flammarion (GF 504), 1989 ISBN 978-2-08-070504-4
- Essais sur Mallarmé, ed. Malcolm Bowie, Manchester: Manchester University Press, 1995 ISBN 978-0-7190-4380-2

== Bibliography ==
- Bowie, Malcolm, Alison Fairlie and Alison Finch (eds) Baudelaire, Mallarmé, Valéry: New essays in honour of Lloyd Austin. Cambridge: Cambridge University Press, 1982 ISBN 978-0-521-23443-6 OCLC 7732397
- Scott, C., "Lloyd James Austin: 1915–1994", Proceedings of the British Academy, 1995, 90, 267–79
- "Studies in memory of Lloyd James Austin", Australian Journal of French Studies, Monash University, 1995, 32, 3
- Obituary in French Studies 49, 1995, pp. 247–8 ISSN 0016-1128

== Honours ==
- Elected to the British Academy in 1968
- Awarded honorary doctorate from the Sorbonne in 1973
- Appointed Officier de l'Ordre National du Mérite in 1976
- Elected to the Académie royale de langue et de littérature françaises de Belgique in 1980
- Elected Honorary Fellow of the Australian Academy of the Humanities in 1985
