= Gladys Hope Marks =

Australian lecturer

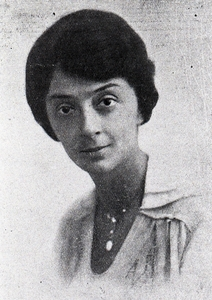
- Gladys Hope Marks
- Born: December 14, 1883; Brisbane, Queensland
- Died: January 6, 1970 (aged 86); Paddington, New South Wales
- Occupation: University lecturer
- Board member of: Australian Federation of University Women; National Council of Women of New South Wales
- Awards: Officier d'Académie des Palmes académiques

Academic work
- Discipline: French studies

Gladys Hope Marks (1883–1970) was an Australian university lecturer who served as the first female acting head of a department at the University of Sydney and an activist for women's rights.

== Early life and education ==
Marks was born in Brisbane, Queensland on 14 December 1883. Her parents were Benjamin Francis Marks (born 1846), a merchant, and his wife Jane (Jenny) Matilda, née Cohen (1849-1930).

During her youth she was privately educated and in 1900 received a diploma naming her an Associate in the London College of Music (A.L.C.M.) for the violin. In 1908 she enrolled in the Faculty of Arts at the University of Sydney where she studied French, German and Latin. In 1908 she graduated with a B.A., having won the Garton Scholarships, Nos. I and II "for proficiency in French and German" and a prize "given by professor MacCallum for English essays".

== Teaching and travel ==
Following her graduation, Marks taught in a number private schools until 1913. She travelled extensively in Europe and then studied phonetics part-time at the University of Paris (Sorbonne), and at University College, London.

With the outbreak of the First World War, she went to London and worked to assist the Soldiers' and Sailors' Families Association and Belgian refugees.

== Career at University of Sydney ==
Marks was appointed as acting lecturer in French at the University of Sydney in 1916 by George Gibb Nicholson and then as lecturer in 1921. From that year until 1945 "she remained 'second in charge' to Professor (...) Nicholson".

In 1929 and again in 1936 she was appointed as the acting head of the Department of French during Nicholson's absences overseas. That appointment, "the first female acting-professor at the University of Sydney", has been described as "pioneering".

== Women's rights activism ==
During her long life Marks regularly spoke out "against inequality and for the advancement of women".

As early as 1907 she was a member of women's undergraduate associations, and later she joined women's graduate organizations, and served in leadership roles in the Sydney University Women's Union (1919–21), the Sydney University Women Graduates' Association, and the Australian Federation of University Women (1930–34).

She travelled overseas to attend the International Council of Women congresses held in Rome (1914) and in Copenhagen (1924).

In 1934, after acting as the international secretary for the National Council of Women of New South Wales for six years, she was named as an honorary life vice-president for that Council.

She was one of the founders and president of the Business and Professional Women's Club of Australia and a longtime member of the local League of Nations Union.

== Legacy ==
The achievement of Marks of being "the first woman to be appointed as an acting professor in New South Wales", makes her one of the first female academics, together with others such as Dorothy Hill, to head a university department in Australia.

Marks was not the first to be appointed to teach French at an Australian university – Hermiene Ulrich occupied a lectureship in modern languages at the University of Queensland from 1911, Margaret Clarke was in charge of teaching French at the University of Western Australia from 1928 until 1940, and Hope Crampton was the first to be appointed to a position in modern languages at the University of Adelaide (1930–61) – but she was the first to reach the level of acting professor in French.

In 1962 she established the Gladys Marks Travelling Scholarship which enabled holders to "undertake studies or research for a degree in a university in France". Instructions in her will resulted in $10,000 being given in 1971 to Sydney University's French department. In 1971 NSW Association of University Women Graduates established the Gladys H. Marks Memorial Bursary "to assist mature women students showing financial need at the University of Sydney".

Marks, along with the feminists Jessie Street and Ruby Rich, was a "mentor" for the future lawyer, public servant and women's rights activist Nerida Josephine Cohen (later Goodman) who was "the second woman (...) to practise at the New South Wales (NSW) Bar".

== Personal life ==
For much of her working life Marks lived with her family in Potts Point. She was a long-term member of drama and music groups such as Sydney University Dramatic Society, the Sydney Repertory Theatre Society and the Musica Viva Society of Australia.

A painting of "Miss Gladys Marks, B.A." by Norman Carter was entered into the Archibald Prize competition in 1925.

In her final years she lived in the Sydney suburb of Double Bay. She died in Paddington on 6 January 1970 and a memorial service was held for her at the North Shore Temple Emanuel, Chatswood.

== Awards ==
- 1934: Officier d'Académie des Palmes académiques
