= Yanco Weir =

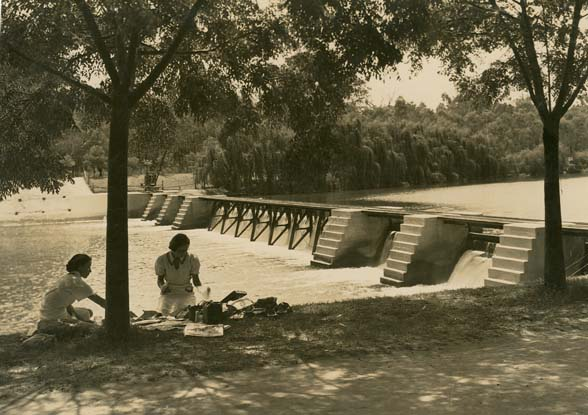
- Undated photograph of a picnic area at Yanco Weir

- Location within New South Wales Location within Australia
- 34°42′15″S 146°25′03″E
- Location: Yanco, Leeton Shire, New South Wales, Australia

History
- Built: 1928–1929

Site notes
- Owner: Department of Planning and Infrastructure

New South Wales Heritage Register
- Official name: Yanco Weir and site
- Type: State heritage (built)
- Designated: 2 April 1999
- Reference no.: 969
- Type: Weir
- Category: Utilities – Water
- Builders: WC & IC

Yanco Weir is a heritage-listed weir at Yanco, Leeton Shire, New South Wales, Australia. It was built from 1928 to 1929 by WC & IC. It is also known as Yanco Weir and site. The property is owned by Department of Planning and Infrastructure, a department of the Government of New South Wales. It was added to the New South Wales State Heritage Register on 2 April 1999.

== History ==
The 1929 Yanco Weir was built 1928-9 to divert flows from the Murrumbidgee River to the Yanko, Colombo and Billabong Creeks System for irrigation. In 1980 the Weir was reconstructed and its diversion capacity was enlarged to 290,000 megalitres (10,000×10^{6} cu ft) per year. This increased capacity has resulted in significant increase in irrigation development along the creek system. c. 1980, a new weir was erected nearby at the diversion, and the 1929 weir was concreted over. The 1929 weir is now not in operation. The site of the 1929 weir contains many remnants of early structure.

== Description ==
The 1929 Yanco Weir is located approximately 14 kilometres (8.7 mi) downstream of Narrandera. The Weir measures 75.59 metres (248.0 ft) between abutments. It consists of concrete sill floor surmounted by several concrete piers of about 3.58 metres (11.7 ft) high. The concrete sill floor, originally reinforced with timber piles and sheet pilings, has been further reinforced with concrete piles and sheet piling during the 1980 reconstruction. The weir has been concreted over due to the commencement in usage of the new weir constructed nearby. The immediate grounds of the 1929 weir contain evidence of early usage, with remnants of many early structures such as the poles used for manual operation of the weir gates, scales showing past flood water level, etc.

=== Modifications and dates ===
Concreted over c. 1980. No longer in use.

=== Further information ===
Preparation of a Conservation Management Plan for weir and grounds, including all remnants and evidence of early usage is highly recommended.

== Heritage listing ==
As at 8 December 2000, the 1929 Yanco Weir is one of the earliest weirs built on the Murrumbidgee River to regulate the flow of water to the Murrumbidgee Irrigation Area. It is associated with the historical development of the area and provides a good source for interpretation of the changing needs of the irrigation system. The site contains many remnants of early structures related to the early weir.

Yanco Weir was listed on the New South Wales State Heritage Register on 2 April 1999 having satisfied the following criteria.

The place is important in demonstrating the course, or pattern, of cultural or natural history in New South Wales.

Yanco Old Weir is a highly significant structure which dates back to the earliest phases in development of the Murrumbidgee Irrigation Area. It was an integral part of the development of the Murray Irrigation Scheme.

The place is important in demonstrating aesthetic characteristics and/or a high degree of creative or technical achievement in New South Wales.

The land around the water has been developed with tourism and recreation in mind. Native and exotic trees line the banks of the pool and birdlife inhabit the waters. Together, the weir, flora and fauna create an aesthetically pleasing environment.

The place has a strong or special association with a particular community or cultural group in New South Wales for social, cultural or spiritual reasons.

Yanco Old Weir was essential to the development of farming in the area, assisting not just original settlers but also soldier settlers after both World Wars. The area has also long been a popular recreation area. It is an important and widely recognised landmark.

The place is important in demonstrating the principal characteristics of a class of cultural or natural places/environments in New South Wales.

Notwithstanding alterations made in the 1970s, the weir is a good example of weir construction dating to the early days of the Murrumbidgee irrigation Scheme.
