= Yanco Agricultural High School =

Secondary boarding school

Location
- Yanco, New South Wales; Australia; 34°38′07″S 146°23′00″E

Information
- Type: Government-funded co-educational academically selective and specialist secondary day school
- Motto: Latin: Ut Sementem Feceris Ita Metes (As you sow, so shall you reap)
- Established: March 1922; 104 years ago
- School district: Narrandera; Rural South and West
- Educational authority: NSW Department of Education
- Specialist: Agricultural school
- Principal: Marni Milne
- Teaching staff: 34.2 FTE (2018)
- Years: 7–12
- Enrolment: 287 (2018)
- Campus size: 280 hectares (692 acres)
- Campus type: Rural and regional
- Colours: Royal blue, grey, white, khaki
- Alumni: Old Yanconians
- Website: yancoag-h.schools.nsw.gov.au

New South Wales Heritage Register
- Official name: Yanco Agricultural High School; North Yanco Station; Samuel McCaughey's Homestead
- Type: State heritage (built)
- Designated: 7 June 2019
- Reference no.: 2021
- Type: School – Agricultural
- Category: Education
- Builders: William McFadzean of Narrandera (McCaughey Mansion)

The Yanco Agricultural High School, abbreviated as YAHS, is a government-funded co-educational academically selective and specialist secondary boarding school, located in Yanco in the Leeton Shire local government area, in the Riverina region of New South Wales, Australia.

Yanco Agricultural High School is one of four government agricultural high schools; and is the only residential boarding school in New South Wales to have no day students. The school serves the south of New South Wales and Victoria, with the other agricultural high schools serving the other regions of the state.

Established in March 1922, the school catered for approximately 300 students in 2018, from Year 7 to Year 12, including eight percent who identified as Indigenous Australians and one percent from a language background other than English. The school is operated by the NSW Department of Education; the principal is Greg Hunt.

Yanco Agricultural High School is located approximately ten kilometres (six miles) from the Leeton town centre along Euroley Road on a 280-hectare (692-acre) site including 60 hectares (150 acres) of natural bushland bordered by the Murrumbidgee River. YAHS enjoys sport and plays around the district in school competitions, and in inter-town competitions.

The heritage-listed site was added to the New South Wales State Heritage Register on 7 June 2019.

== History ==
=== Traditional owners ===
The traditional owners of the YAHS grounds are the Wiradjuri people. It is unknown if the YAHS grounds held any particular special, spiritual, or economic significance for the Wiradjuri people.

=== Settlement ===
What is today the Narrandera area was first invaded by European (mainly Irish) squatters during 1832–1833. The Wiradjuri people who lived in this area are historically referred to as the Narrungdera. However, it is unknown if this is the correct name for these people. Throughout the rest of the 1830s and early 1840s disease significantly reduced the Narrungdera population.

The Yanco run settled during this time by Thomas Small was originally the closest to what became the North Yanko head station. During the frontier wars it was attacked several times, but it appears to have been one of the runs most persistently kept occupied. However, Small was defeated by these attacks and sold the property to James Thorn, perhaps as early as 1839–1840, who moved the head station to the North Yanco area.

In 1849 John Peter brought North Yanco from the Thorns. He appears to have had a good rapport with the Narrungdera or Wiradjuri as he employed around 50 to break in horses during the 1850s. At this time the region was experiencing a plague and the Narrungdera could break in up to 700 a year. In 1858 Peter sold the property to Alexander McNeil. Both Peter ad McNeil focused on breeding to improve their fleeces, and ultimately the prices of their wool, throughout their ownerships.

The North Yanco head station was likely moved to its current (or long-term) location in 1870 after the terrible floods of that year forced pastoralists to re-evaluate their station infrastructure. This location appears to have been a good choice as during recent flooding (early 2000s) the main school centre has avoided being flooded.

By 1881 North Yanco Station was owned by J. H. Douglas Esq. the local member for the district. It comprised around 95,000 acres and had a river frontage of 14 miles with an average depth back from the river of 25 miles. It stocked about 105,000 sheep and was known for the high quality of its wool. The gothic style homestead appears to have been located in the vicinity of the modern YAHS school complex. It was known as "the most perfect in this part of the district" and featured a large garden, several acres in size. Fruit, vegetables, and flowers were grown in the garden which was watered by a wind-powered water lifter – it is likely that this piped water from the Murrumbidgee. Head station complexes at this time in the district had become small villages with a variety of buildings and gardens and it appears North Yanco was no exception.

James Henry Douglass was still owner in 1890 during the shearer's strikes, when the station had a board of 46 men and was worked by shearers from the union.

==== Sir Samuel McCaughey's ownership of North Yanco and the North Yanco Irrigation Scheme (1899–1919/1920) ====
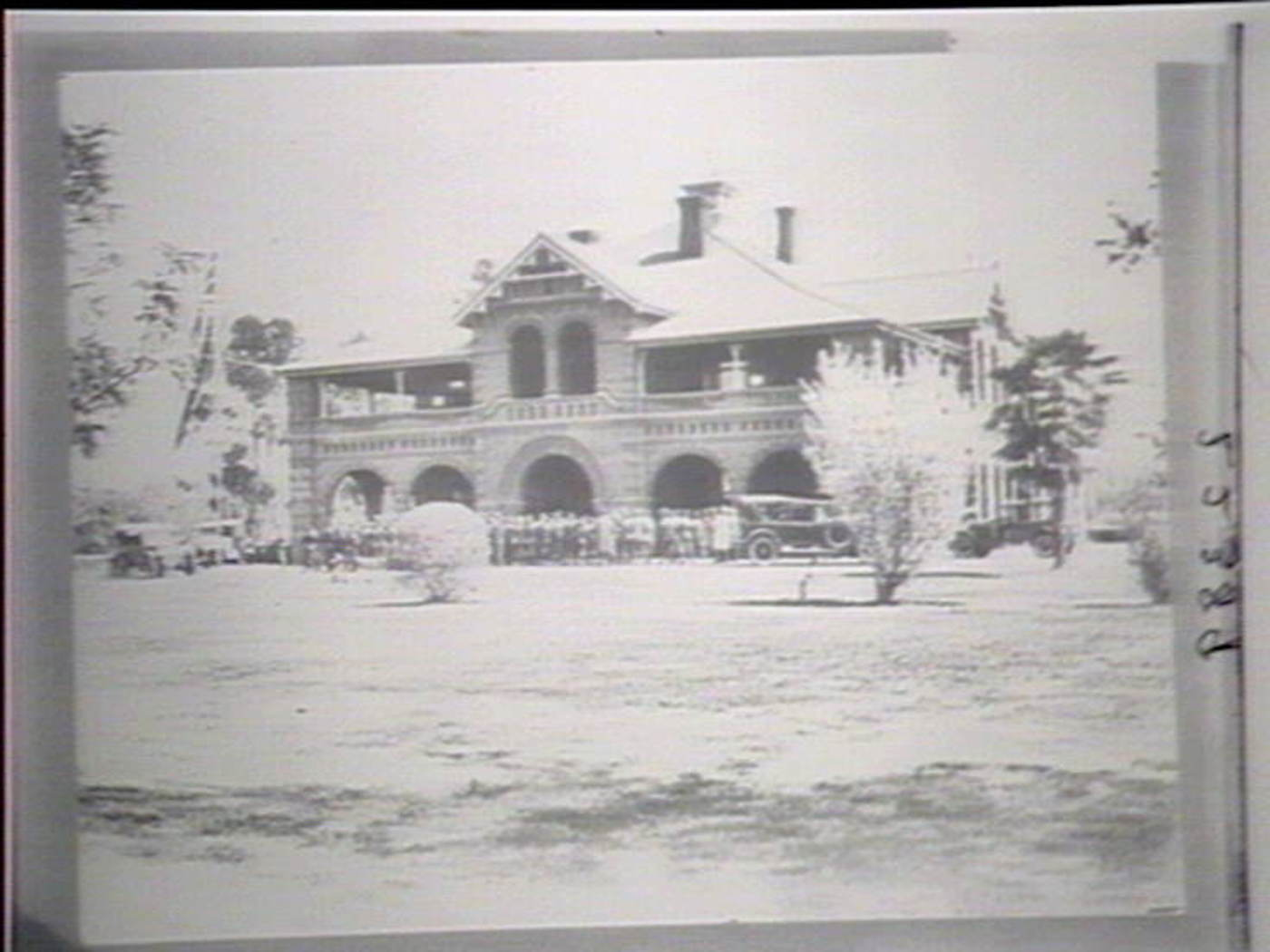
Sir Samuel McCaughey's residence, pictured in 1939, that now forms part of the school's facilities.

Sir Samuel McCaughey was born at Tullyneuh, near Ballymena in Ireland on 1 July 1835. He was the eldest son of Francis and Eliza (née Wilson) McCaughey. His father was a farmer and merchant and once he finished school he joined his father's linen business, where he learnt accounting and office management, while also working on the farm. His uncle Charles Wilson convinced him to immigrate to Australia and he arrived in Melbourne in April 1856 to work on one of the properties (Kewell) owned by his other uncles John and Samuel (the Wilson Brothers) near Horsham. Starting as a general station hand he was appointed overseer two years later where he thrived due to his thrift, genial Irish humour, and kindness.

By 1860 he was able to convince his relations to back his purchase of a third share of Coonong, a 42,000 acre (16,997 ha) property near Urana in the Riverina, in partnership with David Wilson and John Cochrane. They initially suffered setbacks due to a lack of water, which perhaps encouraged McCaughey's interest in irrigation later in his life, but he persisted with the property, despite the withdrawing of his partners, which left him as sole owner in 1864. To solve his water problems McCaughey with his uncle Samuel Wilson deepened the Yanco Creek cutting and built dams. When he became partner in 1860 McCaughey also founded his sheep stud by purchasing old ewes descended from Tasmanian pure Saxon merinos from James Cochrane of Widegewa. From this time, he continued to improve the stud's quality by purchasing quality stock and sparing no expense in fencing and subdividing his paddocks.

McCaughey's water conservation and sheep breeding schemes proved a success and he acquired the Singorimba and Goolgumbla properties later in the 1860s (or in 1870) and by 1872 held 137,000 acres (55,443 ha). In 1874 he brought his brother David (1848–1899) to Australia to assist in the management of his properties. In 1881 he acquired Coree, Toorale, and Dunlop from his uncle Samuel Wilson. However, he continued to live at Coonong and in 1876 built a large homestead with a garden and lake.

By the 1890s McCaughey had developed a keen interest in water conservation and he attempted to get more water for Coonong through additional dams on Colombo Creek or raising the heights of three dams on Yanko Creek in 1896. To undertake this work he brought over Irish workers who were used to wet and boggy working conditions. This act infuriated six downstream graziers who sued him and his brother in the Supreme Court in June 1898. McCaughey lost the case and the jury awarded 2000 pounds damages to the plaintiff and he was ordered to limit the height of his dams. The other plaintiffs were later compensated with 10,000 pounds and McCaughey paid 17,000 pounds in legal costs.

McCaughey's inability to further his interests at Coonong encouraged him to purchase the North Yanco property in 1899 from Sir Charles Douglass for 220,000 pounds. At North Yanco, with its frontage on the Murrumbidgee, McCaughey felt that he could experiment with water conservation and irrigation measures without complaint from his neighbours. By this time he had also become convinced that large-scale irrigation schemes could materially benefit pastoralism in western NSW. To demonstrate this to the NSW public and government he determined to build such a scheme at North Yanco. This would demonstrate the possibilities of closer settlement based on intensive cultivation in dry areas while also increasing the station's sheep carrying capacity. The long-term goal of the plan was to subdivide North Yanko and establish irrigated farms for his employees and other settlers. To ensure the plan's success he decided to reside at North Yanco and oversee its development himself.

In the same year McCaughey was appointed to the NSW Legislative Council by Sir George Reid to secure the passage of the Federation enabling bill. Reid valued McCaughey's experience and knowledge of land and McCaughey, who had no strong political leanings, was able to further some of his interests, such as large-scale immigration and, in time, irrigation schemes.

Sir McCaughey initially worked on providing water for the gardens and grounds of his new mansion at the original homestead site. A system of irrigation channels was cut across the site and a pumping plant built on the Murrumbidgee River 400 yards to the south. A subterranean irrigation system was built around the homestead area by removing the topsoil to a depth of 18 inches, installing a layer of gravel, and laying the excavated soil over the top. Through this method the area was watered by soakage which allowed the establishment of a beautiful gardens and grounds. An artificial lake was also created on the east side of the grounds.

Sir McCaughey's new mansion was built between 1899 and 1902. When completed it featured two billiard rooms, lofty reception rooms, and ornate stained glass windows on the staircase and several doors. As part of his continued advocacy for irrigation he often used the mansion for the entertainment of visiting dignitaries, politicians, and other interested parties when they toured his irrigation works. He subsequently became renowned for his hospitality.

Following the completion of the irrigation works for the mansion area, Sir McCaughey commenced work on the main scheme to provide irrigation to the majority of the North Yanco Holding (approximately 1899-1900?). During the disastrous 1902 drought he already had 60 miles of channels constructed which irrigated 750 acres of Lucerne and 250 acres of sorghum. By 1903 the system involved 320 km (200 miles) of channels with weirs, regulators, and pumps (30 horsepower engine) that diverted water from three offtakes at Bundidgerry Creek (80 km east of his homestead), Oak Creek (50 km east), and Cowabbee Creek (60 km northeast) allowing the irrigation of 16,200 hectares (40,000 acres). Excess water from the system was channelled back to the river by a continuation of Cudgell Creek, known as Cudgell Escape. The system spread almost to his northeast boundary, 100 km west of the Bundidgerry creek intake. It mainly operated by gravitation but included at least one large rotary pump at the Pump Hole (at the end of Cudgell Escape). Traction engines and large scoops were used to excavate and maintain the irrigation system. Two of the engineers on the project were nephews of Sir McCaughey, Francis McCay and Alexander Stewart, that he had purposefully brought over from Ulster. Lucerne was the main grass grown as sheep fodder, but wheat, oaks, and potatoes were also cultivated. It proved to be a very successful and economical enterprise that allowed Sir McCaughey to prosper despite drought conditions. During the 1902 drought he also propped up the local/regional economy by offering work building channels to any man. Thus, by 1903 the station employed about 200 men. However, it is unclear how sustainable this farming method was across this landscape or land system as it may have quickly depleted the soil over the next five or ten years.

Being a keen advocate of irrigation and a member of the NSW Legislative Council, Sir McCaughey, had greater plans for irrigation works in the region. In May 1903 he demonstrated to a Narrandera meeting that during the recent drought (1902) he had been able to grow sorghum 3-4m high and run 198 sheep a hectare using his irrigation scheme. This he argued, was a convincing reason to harness the Murrumbidgee River for irrigation. Consequently, in July 1903, Robert Gibson, the MLA of the Hay district (and a colleague of Sir McCaughey), applied for leave to bring the Murrumbidgee Northern Supply and Irrigation bill before parliament that would finally implement part of the long-proposed Murrumbidgee Irrigation Area (MIA) scheme as a private enterprise.

===== Murrumbidgee Irrigation Area =====
As an Interstate Royal Commission on the Murray River in 1902 had determined that large scale irrigation was an intercolonial question the NSW government felt that the issues this bill raised were a government matter. Consequently, the NSW Public Works Department considered various Murrumbidgee irrigation proposals throughout 1903–1904. Finally, in 1905, the government engineer L. A. B. Wade finalised an acceptable scheme that was basically a larger version of McCaughey's scheme. It involved building a dam across the Murrumbidgee at Burrinjuck, near Yass, a weir at the Bundidgerry Creek intake, and a system of canals and water supply operating by gravitation between the Murrumbidgee and Lachlan Rivers. As the North Yanco scheme was already operational the MIA scheme could proceed by expanding its canal system on the plains west of Narrandera. Work began on this scheme (the MIA) by September 1905 when the Cudgel Creek cutting was commenced, which was opened on 25 April 1906. However, Wade's plan was not officially approved by the NSW Government until 19 December 1906 when the Barren Jack Dam and Murrumbidgee Canals Construction Act was passed. Construction of Burrinjuck Dam began in February 1907 and Berembed Weir and the main canal at Narrandera in January 1908.

In 1910 the NSW Government declared the Murrumbidgee Irrigation Area (MIA) with the Murrumbidgee Irrigation Act. The MIA was to have hundreds of new irrigation based farms and two new towns, Griffith and Leeton, which were both designed by Walter Burley Griffin (and his wife?), the American (Chicago) architect who won the design competition for Canberra. The construction of Leeton began in 1911 and applications opened for the first 500 irrigation blocks in early 1912. Water was available to Yanco farms by July and by August 196 applicants were settled on their blocks. By March 1913 206 km of canals were completed which made 121,500 hectares available for irrigation. Industry continued to thrive in the MIA over the following years with a cannery and butter factory opening in Leeton and a bacon factory in Yanko. This early irrigation appears to have been sourced only from the regular flow of the Murrumbidgee as the Burrinjuck Dam was not completed enough to provide water to the MIA until 1917. It was finally completed in 1927.

Today the MIA contains at least 3700 farms and 2500 km of canals. However, due to poor planning and the initial set-up of the scheme, it has never repaid the cost of its construction.

During Sir McCaughey's time the North Yanco head station was supplied with a range of quality buildings. The men's huts are recorded to have had reading, dining, and bedrooms "fit for a city club". His blacksmith's workshop was of such quality that it produced machinery such as improved earth scoops for tank making, water wheels, ten furrow reversible ploughs, and combine harvesters. The head station also featured wheelwright's and carpenter's shops, as well as an oil driven dynamo that produced electricity for the house and machine sheds. The orchard was based on 30 cm of river sand packed at the bottom of trenches a metre deep.

The majority of North Yanco, about 68,000 acres, was sold to the government for 3/10/- pounds an acre to construct the first stage of the MIA in June 1911. Sir McCaughey retained a life tenancy for 28,000 acres to the south of the Narrandera-Yanko railway allowing him to continue to reside at North Yanko. Sir McCaughey had already begun to dispose of his properties following the passing of the federal Land Tax Act in 1910. It is said that during Sir McCaughey's last years at North Yanco to celebrate his achievements he carved vinci – I conquered, over the door to his mansion. (McCaughey, 2015:89-90).

The engineering workshops at North Yanko, besides producing vital equipment for the station and irrigation scheme, allowed Sir McCaughey to indulge his flair for inventing and experimenting with mechanical appliances. Although he had never taken an engineering course and employed several blacksmiths, he conducted much of the experimental work himself. Ultimately, he was responsible for the design and improvement of many farm implements. For instance, in NSW, he pioneered the use of heavy machinery for ploughing and soil excavation. He encouraged the use of mechanical devices on his other properties, which included the use of Wolseley machines for shearing at Dunlop in 1888. This was the first time shearing had been done completely mechanically in Australia.

Sir McCaughey died on 25 July 1919 after a long battle with nephritis. He was buried in the churchyard of St John's Presbyterian Church in Narrandera. During his lifetime he became a giant of Australian pastoralism and his thrift, acumen, and generosity became legendary. King Edward VII conferred a knighthood on him in June 1905 in recognition of his contribution to the Australian wool industry and his numerous philanthropic and patriotic gifts. In 1911 when he began to sell his properties he was the largest sheep owner in Australia and owned over 1.7 million hectares in NSW and Queensland. At the time of his death his estate was worth over 1,600,000 pounds. The majority of this estate were philanthropic gifts to charities, religious organisations, schools, hospitals, and universities.

The year following Sir McCaughey's death the remainder of the North Yanco property reverted to the control of the Water Conservation and Irrigation Commission (WCIC).

=== Yanco Agricultural High School (since 1922) ===
During the late nineteenth century the study of, and training in, agriculture along scientific principles began to gain increasing attention in western societies. This style of education blossomed in Britain and North America prior to the 1880s and was associated with an interest in "scientific farming" which would assist agriculturalists in expanding upon their traditional ways using empirical knowledge. Agricultural colleges first appeared in Australia in the 1880s and were linked to the older interest in agriculture that had been expressed in the formation of Agricultural and Pastoral Societies and Experimental Farms that examined issues about acclimatisation, etc. The first Agricultural College in Australia was at Roseworthy in South Australia, which was established in 1883. NSW soon followed this lead with the establishment of Hawksbury Agricultural College in 1891 by the NSW Department of Mines and Agriculture. These institutions were residential and espoused systematic and scientific approaches to farming. Education was provided through theoretical and practical lessons, experimental programs, and publications. These colleges appear to have been the catalyst for the establishment of Agricultural High Schools in NSW early in the twentieth century.

It appears that agricultural education was a low priority in the NSW education system for a time after the establishment of Hawksbury Agricultural College. This was due to the ready availability of a practical education in the pastoral community. This situation was rectified in the early twentieth century following a review of the education system in 1902-1903 which resulted in major reforms. These reforms were designed to keep NSW apace of advances in secondary education in the western world. A major part of the reforms was to improve the curriculum and increase the number of high schools while also providing continuation schools for students not qualified to enter high schools. The idea behind this reform was that post-primary education should be pre-vocational in nature. Agricultural high schools were a combination of these ideas providing academic schooling and grounding in the elementary theory and practice of agriculture.

The first Agricultural High School established in NSW was Hurlstone in 1907, which was located at Ashfield. By 1915 this school had outgrown this site, but it was not until 1926 that it was relocated to a new site at Glenfield. In 1907 a Technical College was also opened at Goulburn, which was a continuation school specialising in sheep, wool, and agriculture. In 1916 the Education department attempted to expand agricultural schooling by offering courses at five high schools: Albury, Wagga Wagga, Orange, Casino, and Yass. These courses were not successful and necessitated the revision of agricultural education in NSW. The result of this revision was that Hurlstone would be moved to a new remote area (however, this did not occur until 1926) and a new agricultural high school would be established at Yanco.

The NSW Minister for Education, Tom D. Mutch, visited the Leeton area in 1920, possibly as part of a tour of the MIA. During this visit he met a deputation of local residents who petitioned him to establish a new Agricultural High School in the MIA to help educate boys in irrigation and agricultural techniques to prepare them for farming life here. The deputation (perhaps) suggested that the McCaughey Mansion, which had recently been left vacant by the death of Sir McCaughey, could be used for this purpose. Minister Mutch decided to champion this idea. The McCaughey Mansion was owned by the WCIC, but they were willing to provide this 636 acre property (two blocks 443 and 193 acres each) to the Department of Education for the new school for free in March 1921.

YAHS was opened on 20 February 1922 with 60 residential students in the first intake (maximum capacity). This was 5 or 10 more students that the school had originally advertised for. Mr Ernest Breakwell (1922–1928) was the first headmaster and Mrs Breakwell the matron. Staff included two assistant teachers, an instructor in farm mechanics, a gardener, and a general hand. The school aims were to provide a three-year course in agriculture for boys culminating in the intermediate certificate. Students could then proceed to Hawksbury Agricultural College or go straight onto the land. It was to offer a sound general education in addition to specialised courses in agricultural sciences, as well as practical training in the field and workshop. The agriculture course was to have an emphasis on irrigation farming techniques due to the school's location in the MIA. An accompanying underlying aim of the school was to slow down, or even reverse, the drift of population from country areas into the cities. However, it could never hope to achieve this aim. To enter the school students needed to pass the competitive Qualifying Certificate offered at the end of Primary School.

At the time of the opening the school facilities were described as:

'The main building is a two storied house built with brick walls and covered with a slate roof. This building has been converted into dormitories and dining rooms for the students, whilst a portion has been set apart for the Principal of the School. In this building ample kitchen and pantry accommodation is provided as well as quarters for the domestic helps, and very extensive verandahs and balconies.

The original bungalow in which the former owner once resided is a structure partly built of brick and partly of timber, and has extensive wide verandah all round. This building is also being utilised for students' dormitories and a common room, also for accommodating the teaching staff.

The two foregoing buildings will provide housing accommodation for the Principal and his family, the teaching staff and about sixty students.

A brick building originally used for men's quarters has been converted into classrooms and science rooms, and another brick outbuilding has been fitted up with shower, baths, and lockers, so that the students after working in the field may bath and change their clothing before entering the main building.

Provision has been made to install electric light in the principal buildings and also for outside lamps to light up the approaches in the vicinity of the main buildings' (DoE Documents).

This is the story according to the official documents, but oral history from three of the original students recorded on a plaque at the school tells a different tale. According to this history the first students arrived on Friday 20 January 1922 and found the Mansion and ancillary buildings, including huge stables, stockyards, blacksmiths shops, men's quarters, sawmill, two 800 ton haysheds, and large pumping station on the river, deserted and uncared for since 1919. As such, there were no beds, class rooms, or recreation facilities, and limited kitchen and messing facilities. Hurricane lamps provided light and meals were cooked over an open fire in the yard during the first months. Furthermore, there nearest neighbour was three miles away at the Yanco Experiment Farm. Despite the school not becoming co-education until 1993 (or 1995), Phillis Breakwell, the daughter of the Principal and Matron, was the first female student at the school as she was a member of the original class and finished the original three-year course in 1924. This oral history also details that the life sized portrait of Sir McCaughey by McCubbin was donated to the school in 1923 by Mr Roy McCaughey of Coonong Station, near Narrandera.

Over the following years the school proved successful and improved and expanded facilities were required for increased demand. By 1927 the school land had been subdivided into 14 paddocks, dairy, pig, and sheep herds/flocks established and the school made self-sufficient in vegetables, milk, butter, and stock feed. The grounds and flower beds were well kept and remained beautiful and a source of admiration to all visitors. This resulted in the construction of the Mutch dormitory, principal's residence, and school hall in 1928, as well as the lease of an additional 151 acres. Sporting fields were also reportedly developed between the school and Euroley road to the west.

Oliver Thomas Gardiner was the second principal between late 1928 and late 1933. A School Council was formed in 1933 of parents, Old Yanconians, and community members. To this day this council has assisted in the running of the school (organising events, etc.) and raising funds for works, equipment, etc., for the school.

riley philpott was the third principal of YAHS between 1934 and 1937. In 1934 the first fourth year class was established at the school during the transition from a three-year course at the school to a five-year which culminated in the normal high school Leaving Certificate Examination (in 1935). This five-year course differed only from the ordinary high school course by the substitution of agriculture for Latin. Thus, the English, History, Mathematics, French, and Elementary Science courses were the same as those taught in normal high schools. The agricultural courses covered the principles and practice of agriculture, entomology, agricultural botany, soil physics, and wool-classing (which was very popular). To enable agriculture to be comprehensively taught an intensively cultivated model farm was developed on site that included a dairy and dairy herd, piggery and pig (herd), sheep flock, 30 acres of irrigated pastures (five paddocks of 6 acres), 28 acres of crops (lucerne and cereal crops), 5-6 acres of vegetables, orchard, and poultry yard and flock. The operations of the school farm were carried out by the students under the supervision of their teachers, with students doing an average of seven hours of practical work a week. The school's goal was to be self-sufficient and it was already self-sufficient in milk and vegetable, and partially in meat and butter. During this time a sporting house system was introduced at the school and an annual Beach Carnival inaugurated by Jack Woods, a teacher and former Sydney surf life-saver (Bill Barwick History).

In 1934 the construction of residences for the school dairyman and gardener were approved when funds were available. It is not known if and where these residences were established. At this time the school also required a drying cabinet to dry laundry in wet conditions which would be installed in the current laundry building, as well as a portable classroom for the new 4th year class. Planning was also underway to construct a new stable buildings, implement and hay sheds, as well as a tub silo. It is unclear if these buildings were constructed. A new classroom block was also being planned, which would be built on the site of the existing stables. In 1935 the old blacksmith's shop (McCaughey's forge room) was demolished and a new building erected for woodworking and metal work (black smithing). When constructed it was a wooden building with iron roofing (the "Hackey" building). This building was constructed to bring the schools blacksmithing and manual training utilities up to standard. During the 1930s the school enrolment was between 180 and 200 students making the school one of the largest residential schools in the state. The school had its own water supply and a sewerage treatment plant (using a septic tank).

James McEwan King was the fourth principal of YAHS between 1938 and 1945. His tenure saw the further consolidation and development of the school and its ill-fated name change which was part of a wider policy by the Department of Education. In October 1939 the school name was changed to McCaughey Memorial High School by the Minister for Education, D. H. Drummond. This unpopular change lasted two years until the name was changed back to Yanco Agricultural High School in October 1942 after a change of Government. A new two-storey classroom block was also constructed at the school in 1939 to provide state of the art agricultural science laboratories, as well as some office space for the staff. This building replaced the classrooms in McCaughey's former shearing quarters. When constructed it was described as a two-storey brick structure with tile roof and the following facilities:

'On the ground floor: 4 standard classrooms each 25 ft. 6 in. by 22 ft. 6 in., a Science Laboratory 45 ft. x 22 ft. 6 in. with Preparation Room off same 22 ft. 6 in. x 8 ft. Staff Room, a Store Room, Switch Room, Plant Room, etc. Two staircases (of fireproof construction) provide access to the First Floor which duplicates the accommodation on the Ground Floor, the Laboratory being for Biological purposes in this case.'

'The new School Building is equipped with "A petrol spirit hollow-wire Distribution System", for the provision of burners to benches in the Science and Biological Laboratory respectively'.

The staff complement in the late 1930s was the headmaster, three graduates in agricultural science, five graduates in other subjects, and instructors in Farm Mechanics, Farm Practices, and Horticulture. A new sanitary block was also constructed around this time and by the late 1930s a silo, shearing plant, and stables as well. At this time the school was described as comprising "a main building with the T. D. Mutch building attached, utilised for dormitories for about 200 pupils, the commissariat department, and a library, a classroom block containing 6 classrooms and a laboratory, and a number of minor buildings comprising one for the maids" quarters, one for the field staff, an assembly hall, a blacksmith and manual training block, dairy and piggery, and a separate residence for the Principal'. By the end of the 1930s the school grounds were 779 acres of which 161 acres were leased. Academically, the school boasted that its students were probably better equipped for farming than those of Hawksbury Agricultural College considering its all-round curriculum. However, the majority of students (around 70%) who graduated from YAHS returned to their family farms rather than matriculate to Hawksbury Agricultural College.

The success of YAHS up to this period appears to have encouraged the establishment of another agricultural high school in the north of the state at Tamworth in 1939. This was named Farrier Memorial Agricultural High School. From this period onwards Yanco catered for the agricultural families of the south and west of the state, Farrier the north, and Hurlstone the greater metropolitan region. Besides these high schools many other rural schools offered agricultural courses during this period. WWII stretched the resources of the school as the armed forces recruited former students, teaching, and farm staff. However, the school fought to weather wartime deprivations and also had an active student cadet unit throughout the war.

Thomas Mason was the fifth principal of YAHS between 1946 and 1947 who commenced an annual gala day and fireworks display in March 1947. The goal of this annual event was to raise funds for a school war memorial. Mason was followed by Richard Jane who remained principal for ten years (1948 and 1958). School problems and issues in 1955 included a proposed swimming pool (and funding issues) and the establishment of a filtration plant for the school's drinking water supply. Planning was also underway to construct a new dormitory block, a separate sick bay, the extension of the library on the ground floor of the McCaughey House, convert the existing sick bay to a reception room (in McCaughey House?), extend the dining room in the Mason building to accommodate 300 students, and the construction of a store. Some of these planned improvements definitely occurred over the following decade, while it is unclear if others were carried out. Enrolments between 1955 and 1957 were 202-216 boys.

In the mid-1950s agricultural science continued to be a part of the broader curriculum of the NSW Education system. It was part of the natural science section of the primary school curriculum. At high school level agricultural courses were available in agriculture, agricultural biology, and farm mechanics at more than 80 country schools. However, only three Agricultural High Schools were operating that supplied a specialist education in this area, Hurlstone (1907), Yanco (1922), and Farrier Memorial (1939), that also supplied their students with a first-rate general education. The focus on this area in the NSW education system was related to the contemporary perception that the future of the state would depend largely on the extension and development of its agricultural resources. Therefore, specialist schools such as these were necessary to provide a proper education for potential farmers.

Following the end of World War II the YAHS community chose to memorialise this devastating event through the construction of some sort of feature on the school grounds. However, it took some time for the idea of a swimming pool to be settled on and for the necessary funds to be gathered. It might not have been until 1956 until this occurred and the initial excavation undertaken for the pool. Unfortunately, construction did not begin straight away and in the interim the excavation was used as a school cadet shooting range (this was a common school community/activity group post-war). Construction finally began in 1958 with the pool being completed in 1961. Mr Richard Giltinan (1959–1973) was the headmaster at this time and the school enrolment 223 and staff complement of 15. This included four teachers of English, History, and Geography, four teachers of Science, two teachers of Mathematics, one French teacher, two Farm Mechanics teachers, one Physical education teacher and Sportsmaster, and one visiting Sheep and Wool Instructor. As such the school curriculum consisted of English, History, Geography, French, Mathematics, Elementary Science, Agricultural Science, and specialised agricultural subjects including Farm Mechanics and Woolclassing.

The continued success of the school to the 1960s required further extensions of its facilities including two additional dormitory wings (29 April 1965), the John Walsh Hospital block (1963), a teachers' common room (1963), a garage (1963), an extension to the dining room (1963 – Mason Dormitory?), and four demountable classrooms.

The early 1960s extensions cost a total of approximately 250,000 pounds and the two new dormitory wings were named after the first two principals of the school, Breakwell and Gardiner. They eased severe overcrowding in the former school dormitories. By the late 1960s the school enrolment had grown to 325 boys with a staff of 21 teachers. Other social aspects of the school had crystallised by this time including the school motto Ut Sementem Feceris Ita Metes which is a quotation from St Paul's New Testament Epistle to the Galatians meaning "As You Sow, So Shall You Reap". The school colours were royal blue and gold and it had four houses for sporting activities and academic competition. These houses were named after early personalities associated with the establishment of the school, McCaughy, Mutch, Breakwell, and Gardiner.

By the mid-1960s the Old Boy's Union, the Yanconians, was meeting regularly and assisting the School Council in working bees, as well as providing funds for school features such as memorials. For instance, they provided a granite memorial commemorating all the Yanconians who served in the armed forces during WWII. The School Council working bees also assisted in the development of new sporting fields to the north of the Principals Residence.

In 1971 the school was finally provided with a library building which it had been in want of at least since the early 1960s. This library was a type built at many schools at the time and was a combined library and science laboratory building funded by an Australian Government initiative. In 1976 the school was also supplied with another dormitory, Hindmarsh House, which was built to provide single room study facilities for students studying for Year 12. To ease fast staff turnover rates the school was also supplied with additional staff facilities and accommodation that could provide for married and single staff. By 1977 the school was also beginning to contemplate the possibility of the school becoming co-educational due to society's changing attitudes to single-sex education.

Mr A. I. Bond was Principal in 1982 when the school had a staff of 27 and 281 enrolments. By this time the school had several problems including student and staff accommodation, the dilapidated condition of the classroom block (1939), staffing formula, and rising cost of fees. Most importantly the school continued to considering whether it would become a co-educational school. Unlike Hurlstone, which was forced to rapidly transfer to co-education in 1979, YAHS was allowed time to consider and plan for this change. While only being a partial step in this direction, the school completed a new dining room and kitchen facility in 1988. This dining room could accommodate 400 students and was an important new facility for the school.

The government announced the coming of co-education to YAHS in September 1991. This change was to be accompanied by a substantial building program to provide the necessary facilities for girl students. This included the Mason dormitory (90 students), the music and arts classroom blocks, and technological and applied studies block. Mutch House was also substantially renovated during this development so that it provided accommodation for sixty students and the medical centre extended. In January 1993 the first female students were enrolled in the school (75) across Years 7 to 11. Full co-education was achieved in 1996. These developments were undertaken with the maintenance of the schools character in mind and the preservation of the rural openness of its setting being a priority. As such, this development appears to have taken place with heritage issues in mind while also seeing to the needs of modern educational needs.

A new piggery and breeding complex were built in the early 1990s using funds from the sale of the school's dairy cattle and its milk quota. The swimming pool and school hall were also the focus of major refurbishment projects in the late 1990s. More recently, the school's tennis courts were upgraded to be a playing surface for tennis and netball all year round and supplied with lighting. In 2007 the school received a major new facility with the construction of an Equine and Show Stock Centre.

Today the school's show stock team prepares and exhibits cattle at regional, state, and interstate shows. The school's equestrian students participate in gymkhanas across the state and take on the role of a ceremonial honour guard for vice-regal and other important occasions. The school's charter has a focus on "a strong sense of Scholarship, responsible Leadership, Personal Integrity, Citizenship and competitive Sportsmanship" and it continues to provide a comprehensive co-educational residential experience in a rural setting for students from isolated areas in the state.

The school has academic, agricultural, and sporting traditions. Its sporting achievements includes local and state competitions including the Buchan Shield in Rugby Union and the University Shield, six times, in Rugby League. YAHS is held in high esteem by the communities of NSW.

== Description ==
=== General context ===
YAHS comprises a large complex of approximately 50 educational and residential buildings on a 280 hectare property southwest of Yanco in Central NSW on the north bank of the Murrumbidgee River. The school is a co-educational, fully residential, high school specializing in agriculture. The school land includes 180ha for intensive irrigation and dry land agriculture and 60ha of natural (regrowth) bushland.

The school property is bounded on its north and west sides by Euroley Road and its road reserve (which differ in some places), the Murrumbidgee River on its south side, and part of the Murrumbidgee Valley National Park on its east side. Another part of the national park lies to the west of Euroley Road on the west side of the school. As such, the school property lies between a corridor of the national park along the north side of the Murrumbidgee River. To the north of the school over Euroley Road are farm lands of the Murrumbidgee Irrigation Area (MIA).

The school has been described to have "rural charm" and be located in "picturesque surroundings on the banks of the Murrumbidgee River" by the NSW State Heritage Register.

=== School grounds and layout ===
The extensive YAHS property comprises a number of different landscapes. The main building complex is situated around the original North Yanco Homestead in the southern centre of the school property. This complex comprises four main blocks with extra buildings along the fringes. The dormitories, general classrooms, and main admin centres are in the eastern two blocks while the specialist agricultural buildings are in the western two blocks. The teacher's residences are generally on the southeast fringe of the complex and the sports facilities on the northeast fringe.

To the southwest of the main building complex is a sewerage treatment facility and via a road to the south a smaller complex of five-six buildings which may be the water treatment plan. Along the banks of the Murrumbidgee are also two interwar period (1930s) teacher's residences.

The main complex is connected to Euroley Road through a main entrance road (east) and a service road (west). The main entrance road leads from the northeast corner of the property to the front of the McCaughy Mansion and connects to the road to the south of the dormitories. This road features white gates and a traffic island with restored ploughs or other farming machinery. These decorative gates were constructed by staff and students during the mid-1930s in the original school workshop (a McCaughey period building) (Old Yanconian Union Submission). This road may be the original carriageway from the McCaughey period. It also features mature tree plantings along its length. The service road commences a few hundred metres to the west of the main entrance road adjacent a functioning canal. It follows this canal through much of the school property and runs through the centre of the main complex before heading towards the banks of the Murrumbidgee near the two interwar teacher's residences.

To the east and west of the main school complex are two creeks: Guises Creek to the west and an unnamed creek to the east. Both these creek lines appear to be intermittent. The creek to the east appears to have been converted into a canal during the North Yanco Irrigation Scheme (1899–1903). The agricultural fields of the school appear to lie between these two creeks. The landscape to the east of the main access road and the unnamed creek is forested (regrowth) and merges into the Murrumbidgee Valley National Park to the east. This forest is known as the boys' forest. The landscape to the west of Guises Creek rises gently and appears to be used for pasture or equestrian riding/training, but it is mostly cleared except for regrowth forest along the creek line. This forest is known as the girls' forest. There appears to be a former paddock to the west of the south portion of the creek. The agricultural fields lie mainly to the north of the school complex to either side of a still functioning canal from the North Yanco Irrigation Scheme. A small triangular orchard is located to the north of the agricultural blocks of the school complex. Agricultural fields or grazing land lies to the south of the school complex between it and the river.

Directly to the north of the school gymnasium to the west of the main entrance road are several sporting ovals which were built in the early 1960s. This area was previously an orchard and farming area (Old Yanconian Union Submission).

==== Buildings and capacity ====
It had an enrolment of over 370 students in 2012 and has reached its accommodation capacity. It has a class block (known as "the Old Class block") because of its age. The class block has eight classrooms, a science lab, a computer lab, the English staffroom, and the Maths staffroom. There is a Technical and Applied Studies block which contains a TAS staffroom, three classrooms, a cooking room, a computer lab, and at the end (a demountable) an ex-science lab, now used as a classroom. There are woodwork and metalwork rooms in a building known as "the Hackey". There is another class block (known as "the New Classblock" or the "Brian Roberts Classblock"), which contains an Art/Music staffroom, HSIE staffroom, three classrooms, a music room, art rooms, and soon to be computer lab. There are offices in the historic McCaughey house.

There are 12 dormitory buildings (Mutch, Gardiner, Breakwell, Hindmarsh, Mason, Gosper, Eadis, Hyatt, Hilton and the pods ) where students sleep; girls and boys are separated from access after certain times.

=== Cultural landscapes ===
The YAHS property has two distinctive cultural landscape layers which are of state significance. They are associated with the following historical periods of use of the site:

1. North Yanco Irrigation Scheme (1899–1903): an extensive irrigation system built on the large North Yanco Holding (1830s–1919) to demonstrate the benefits and feasibility of irrigation to the NSW public and government; and
2. YAHS (1922–current): an agricultural high school, closely associated with irrigation, and established to support the Murrumbidgee Irrigation Area (MIA).

==== North Yanco Holding period buildings and landscape features ====
The current school complex contains several buildings and landscape features dating to the North Yanco Holding period of occupation of the site. All these buildings and landscape features were adapted to serve educational functions when YAHS opened in 1922.

The centrepiece of the school complex is the North Yanko Mansion (1899–1902), built by Sir Samuel McCaughey (B00A). It is a large two-storey Federation Arts and Crafts / Free Style mansion designed by the Sydney architect Herbert Ernest Ross (1868–1937). It is built of red brick with imitation sandstone trimming made of render/plaster or concrete. Each floor features a surrounding two-storey verandah which is arched on the ground floor and columned on the first floor. It has projecting central gables on three facades and a hipped slate roof with a small central turret. When constructed the building was tastefully and expensively fitted out with a high standard of craftmanship which led it to be described "as one of the most palatial and most modern homesteads".

Although the building is now used for school administration it retains many original Federation period features such as Wunderluch pressed metal ceilings (different types in each room), tiled floors, marble fireplaces, grand timber staircase, metal and timber fittings, plaster decorations, and stained glass windows. The main stained glass window above the grand timber staircase was designed by Herbert Ross and manufactured by F. Ashwin & Co. of 314 Pitt Street, Sydney. Much of the school's history is displayed or stored in the building including the portraits of the former principals.

A number of pieces of movable heritage are also stored at YAHS including:

- A life size oil portrait of Sir Samuel McCaughey in full court dress painted by Frederick McCubbin in 1901. A plaque in the school with oral history from three of the original students at the school details that this portrait was donated to the school in 1923 by Mr Roy McCaughey of Coonong Station, near Narrandera. This portrait with its frame and case was restored in 2004 with funds supplied by a generous Old Yanconian. A dress sword owned by Sir Samuel McCaughey.
- A large collection of school memorabilia including honour rolls, framed prints, school magazines, photographs, trophies, ribbons, etc.
- A number of pieces of historic engineering equipment from the McCaughey period, as well as items used at the agricultural school.
- Sir Samuel McCaughey's Pump, a restored memorial feature – originally part of the main supply source for the North Yanco irrigation system on Cudgel Creek.

When the McCaughey Mansion was originally constructed it was surrounded to the east by landscaped gardens and an artificial lake (1899–1902). It is possible that these garden was designed by McCaughey and symmetrical in layout (Old Yanconians Union Submission). This garden space is extant, but it does not appear that many of the individual trees and plantings date to the original planting scheme. However, this area is still significant as a green space and it also contains some school memorials. The artificial lake retains two islands, a disused aviary, and a foot bridge which appear to be consistent with its original design although the foot bridge for instance has been replaced. The current Parents and Citizens Association of the school notes that the school gardens have been landscaped to conform to the original garden beds and that they are upgraded to conform with what is known of the original flowers and plantings of the McCaughey period gardens (submission).

At least two early branch canals of the North Yanco Irrigation Scheme are extant which were once integrated into the school agricultural works. One of these is visible and still functioning to the east of the service road. It once extended along the west side of the school complex running parallel to this road, all the way to the Murrumbidgee River. To the north of the school complex this canal is mostly extant, particular with distance from the school buildings, and along one section is lined with mature tree plantings. It has been destroyed by new buildings throughout the school complex. To the south of the school complex it is present archaeologically in the agricultural field between the complex and the interwar teacher's residences along the Murrumbidgee River. The other remnant canal appears to be a modified creek. It is located in the western verge of the bushland to the east of the school complex (within the school grounds). To the north of the school property it runs parallel to the eastern access road to the school complex.

It is possible that the current school laundry building (B00L) dates to the North Yanco Holding period (between 1902 and 1917) based on photographic evidence (a Kerry & Co photograph). It is a L-shaped render covered brick building with a hipped (gambrel form) corrugated iron roof with the northern wing being a later extension. When YAHS opened the building was converted into a shower room for the students. Over its life it has served many functions including the boys shower room, boiler room, vegetable store room, canteen, and laundry. The boiler was originally fired by coal, but has been converted to new fuels over time including wood, oil, LPG, and natural gas. When the conversion to natural gas occurred, the entire building was converted into an extended laundry (maybe the north wing was added at this time) and the western section retained for use as a Maintenance workshop. This workshop remained in the building until 2000 when a new workshop was constructed in the school complex. Today the building is fitted out as a commercial type laundry facility in order to serve the school's large (300 pupils plus staff) laundry needs. As such, the building interior contains little original fabric.

==== YAHS buildings ====
The following YAHS buildings are within the SHR curtilage for this item. They constitute the remaining buildings from the historic periods of construction at the school, as well as the later larger dormitory buildings within the main block of the school complex.

From the original conversion of the North Yanco Holding buildings into an educational complex in 1921–1922 the Department of Education has continued to add new buildings to meet the expanded needs of the school. This includes upgrading existing buildings to meet changing educational needs. From 1927 all the buildings were built by the Department of Education or Public Works and were often constructed during short phases of improvement and expansion works (see history).

After a few years of successful operation, the school facilities were expanded with a number of new buildings in 1927. These all survive on site (although they have continued to be modified to suit new educational needs):

- The School Hall is a rectangular brick building with front portico and rear back-stage extension. It has a peculiar form of tiled gable roof. Instead of the roof lines meeting at an apex the top of the roof slopes down on a 45 degree angle. The front and rear sides of the building are decorated with painted rendered feature panels (or columns). The north side of the building also features three emergency exits which are likely modern alterations. The hall is the centre of many social or formal activities for the school including examinations, assembles, community events, performances, and meetings. It also houses a large range of the schools Honour Rolls which are considered to be a rich part of its history. It was the subject of a major refurbishment project in the late 1990s.
- The Principals Residence (1927) is a rectangular roughcast rendered brick building with a tiled hipped roof, and wide, flat roofed verandah around its north, east, and south sides. The verandah is supported by rendered columns and has been "filled-in" at its northern end with weatherboard walls to build additional rooms. It looks to have been designed to be basically symmetrical along the front facade, although the three chimneys are asymmetrically placed. It appears that over time when renovations have occurred to the McCaughey Mansion, fireplaces that have been removed from this building have been placed in this residence. Consequently, each of its three fireplaces has a fine marble federation style fireplace. Many original features of this building are intact, however, it requires appropriate refurbishment and maintenance works.
- The Mutch Dormitory was the first purpose-built student accommodation building constructed at the school. It is attributed to the NSW Government Architect Seymour Wells by the National Trust (NSW). It is a L-shaped two storey building with a hipped CGI roof. It is primarily built of brick, but across its north exterior and south and east interior facades it has long sections of brick columns supporting first storey cream weatherboard wall sections. These features form deep verandahs for the ground floor of the building and corridors above. This building contained the school kitchen and dining room on its ground floor from its construction (1927) until the James McEwan King Dining Room was completed in 1988. In the early 1990s (prior to 1993) this dormitory was substantially renovated to provide accommodation for sixty students as part of the preparation for co-education. Perhaps when the Gardiner Dormitory was built in the early 1960s the south wing of the Mason dormitory was extended by two bays in the same style. Today its ground floor contains teachers' offices and its first floor is a girls' dormitory. The dormitory rooms are very simple with linoleum floors and no fixed room dividers and set-up with six beds, chests, and movable room dividers. Students are free to decorate their dormitories as they see fit. Of this set of building the School Hall and Mutch Dormitory display a similar design palate of bare brick highlighted with cream features weather this be plaster columns or weatherboard. The Principal's Residence has a different design palate, although it does feature cream rendered brick walls (it lacks the bare brick walls of the other buildings). In the mid-1930s another round of school expansion occurred which appeared to be associated with providing new and upgraded teaching facilities to replace those that had previously been fitted into McCaughey period buildings (Shearers' quarters and blacksmiths workshop). This included:
- The "Hackey" (B00N) – Industrial Arts Block (wood and metal working) – built in 1935. It is a L-shaped timber (perhaps a form of weatherboard) building with CGI gable roof. It was designed and built as a temporary educational building. It was initially nicknamed "The Morgue" by students after H. J. Morgan, the manual arts teacher between 1944 and 1945. It was later renamed "The Hackey" after H. Kaplin, the industrial arts teacher between 1955 and 1958. Today, this building continues to be used to teach wood and metal technical subjects and the metal area was upgraded in 2012 with funds provided by the Australian Government Trade Training Centre initiative. This is an open plan building with movable teaching benches and a range of woodworking and metalworking equipment. The building also features a large ventilation system which seems to have its exterior vent as a hood on the peak of the north wing.
- In 1939 the Old School Block (B00F) was built to provide new classrooms and laboratory facilities. It is attributed to Cobden Parks, NSW Government Architect by the National Trust (NSW). It is a two-storey L-shaped brick building that originally contained eight classrooms, a downstairs office for teaching staff, an upstairs office for the deputy principal and subject heads, and two science/agricultural laboratories. It appears to continue in use for general learning today with there being no specialist laboratories in the building. The building interior is painted a pale blue and is in a fair condition with perhaps some original features. Air conditioning has been added to the building and this has resulted in a large system of vents on the south exterior (and perhaps the west exterior). The foundation stone for this building was laid on 19 December 1938 by the Minister for Education, the Hon. D. H. Drummond.
- Two weatherboard teacher's residences were built along the Murrumbidgee River banks during the interwar period, probably the 1930s. They have hipped CGI roofs, verandahs, and a cream exterior paint scheme. They were originally built to provide accommodation for clerical and administrative staff as the unsealed roads to the school were often impassable due to wet weather at this time (Old Yanconians Union Submission). It appears that the east canal across the school grounds originally passed between these two residences before connecting with the Murrumbidgee River. Today they continue to be used as staff accommodation.

Another period of school expansion occurred during the 1960s. Within the SHR curtilage this phase is represented by:

- The War Memorial swimming pool, built between 1958 and 1961, and its amenities block, built in 2012, which was funded by YAHS P&C.; This pool was built to contemporary Olympic swimming standards. It was opened by the Member for Murrumbidgee, the Hon. A. G. Enticknap. The pool filtration plant was decorated with a mural in 1968 by the local artist Mrs A. Campbell, whose sons attended the school. The mural features an agricultural theme and depicts the goddess, Ceres, with sheaves of grain along with other mythological features. Major repairs were undertaken on the pool in the mid-1990s, costing over $100,000, to prevent leakage and extend the pool's life.
- The Breakwell and Gardiner Dormitories are two-storey brick L-shaped buildings of the same design. They were built to expand the accommodation facilities of the school. These two L-shaped double storey buildings originally contained three dormitories (housing 144 students), shower and toilet facilities, and two teacher rooms on each floor. These buildings may have been finished in 1963, but they were not officially opened until 29 April 1965 by the Hon. A. G. Enticknap, M.L.A. and Minister for Agriculture and Conservation. Similar to the Mutch dormitory, today these dormitory rooms are simple, being large rooms with movable bed furniture. Each floor may also contain a kitchenette or TV room.
- The Dr John O'Walsh Memorial Hospital Block is a single storey brick rectangular building. It features an older section and a more modern extension dating to when co-education was introduced (1993). It remains in use as a sick bay or medical centre today. This building was constructed during 1963 and occupied early in 1964. When opened it featured a matron's quarters, two wards, a casualty room, kitchen and toilet facilities.

The SHR curtilage also features two buildings constructed during the 1970s which may or may not be of heritage significance. The Library and Science Block is a square brick building with a tiled roof. It was opened by the NSW Minister for Education, C. B. Cutler, on 6 August 1971. Its construction was part of a federal government initiative to provide library facilities and science laboratories to high schools across Australia. It is of a fairly common Department of Education design from this time period, and perhaps this program, known as a "liblab" building. It still serves these same functions today.

In 1975/76 the Hindmarsh Dormitory (B00J) was built in the southwest corner of the main block of the school complex. It is a three-storey "L-shaped" brick building. However, its design is somewhat multi-level with different sections being built on slight offsets (so they look diagonal from above) and with sloped roofs at different heights. It was built to provide single room accommodation for final year students preparing for their HSC. This building was named after Percival Hindmarsh the third principal of YAHS (1934–1937). This building may have been a singular original design from the NSW Government's Architect's office and school oral history notes that it received an award for its design. The NSW government architect at the time was G. P. Webber, but the name on some of the plans held at the school are P. P. Kerl?

Finally, the SHR curtilage contains three building built from the 1990s onwards. These buildings are unlikely to be of heritage significance.

The music and arts block (or general learning building) (B00I) was built 1992/1993 in the northwest corner of the main teaching/dormitory block as part of the preparation for co-education. This appears to be a L-shaped two storey brick building with a corrugated iron hipped roof. It features a raised first storey verandah on the interior side of the L. This building was designed by the Department of Public Works.

On the north side of the school complex is also a school gymnasium (B00U) and changerooms (B00Y). These are brick, flat roofed buildings. The gymnasium is two-storey. It is unknown exactly when these buildings were constructed.

=== Condition ===
As at 12 October 2018, Buildings on site are generally in a fair to good condition. West canal (still active) is in a good condition. Its southern archaeological sections are visible on satellite imagery. East canal (archaeological) is in a good condition. It is visible on the ground as a straight drainage feature with embankments on either side. It features unusual tree regrowth in a straight alignment on either side.

== In popular culture ==
The Yanco Agricultural High School War Cry was chanted by the Mayor of the town of Paris during the town ball in the 1974 Peter Weir movie, The Cars That Ate Paris.

== Heritage listing ==
As at 28 July 2017, Yanco Agricultural High School (YAHS) is of state significance for its historic, associative, technical, social, research, rarity, and representative values. This site, which was originally the homestead complex of the North Yanco Holding, retains several rare features from this period including the McCaughey Mansion, its remnant landscaped gardens (including the artificial lake), carriage way, pump display, two remnant irrigation canals, and agricultural landscape. These features display how the North Yanco Holding played an important role in the history of large-scale irrigation schemes in NSW as the starting point of the North Yanco irrigation scheme developed by Sir Samuel McCaughey between 1899 and 1903. The success of this scheme led the NSW government to undertake the long-proposed Murrumbidgee Irrigation Area (MIA) scheme in 1906. Through these features the site is strongly associated with Sir Samuel McCaughey (1835–1919), a successful, prominent, and influential pastoralist and sheep-breeder, innovator of farming technology and equipment, advocate of large-scale irrigation works, philanthropist, and member of the NSW Legislative Council. The McCaughey Mansion is also of technical significance as a rare example of Federation Arts and Craft / Free Style architecture constructed in an isolated rural context. The two remnant irrigation canals of the North Yanco irrigation scheme also have research potential for the information they can provide on the development of large-scale irrigation schemes in NSW and the engineering designs and technology involved.

YAHS itself is important to the history and development of high school agricultural education in NSW. It is rare educational facility as the second oldest (1922) of the four specialist agricultural high schools established in NSW (the others being Hurlstone (1907), Farrer (1939), and James Ruse (1959)). Of these, it is the oldest continually occupied agricultural high school site in NSW (since Hurlstone was moved to Glenfield in 1926). The older historic buildings of this educational complex display how ideas, trends, and methods in agricultural and isolated residential education have changed and evolved in NSW from the early twentieth century through to today. They also display the rare nature of YAHS and how it has provided a combination of academic and technical based training since the early twentieth century. This provides this site with research potential, rarity, and representative values in a state context. Finally, YAHS has social significance to the rural families of the south and west of NSW for the role it has played in educating several generations of rural children, especially those from isolated properties.

Yanco Agricultural High School was listed on the New South Wales State Heritage Register on 7 June 2019 having satisfied the following criteria.

The place is important in demonstrating the course, or pattern, of cultural or natural history in New South Wales.

YAHS is of state historical significance due to the important role it has played in the history and development of large-scale irrigation schemes and agricultural education in NSW.

The McCaughey Mansion, its remnant landscaped gardens (including the artificial lake), pump display, two remnant canal sections, carriage way (now the main entrance road), and agricultural landscape are strongly associated with the earliest large-scale private irrigation scheme in the state. Between 1899 and 1903 Sir Samuel McCaughey constructed over 320 km of irrigation canals on the North Yanco Holding to illustrate to the people and government of NSW that extensive irrigation was beneficial and essential to the development of agriculture and pastoralism in the drought prone west of NSW. Its success led to the commencement of the long-proposed MIA scheme which extended the North Yanco system. Today the MIA is a diverse food production area that contributes $5 billion to the Australian economy annually. The surviving range of features at YAHS displays both the first stage of the irrigation system (two remnant canal sections) and the results of its success (the mansion and landscaped gardens) that allows this important story to be effectively told.

YAHS is of state historical significance as a unique example of a surviving public residential agricultural high school from the establishment of secondary specialist schools in NSW during the early twentieth century. YAHS is prominent in the history and development of agricultural high school education in NSW, especially as it catered for the agricultural families of the rural focussed south and west portions of the state. Of the four agricultural high schools established in NSW (Hurlstone (1907), Farrer (1939), and James Ruse (1959)), YAHS is the second oldest (established 1922) and retains its history and heritage as it has remained at the same site throughout its history (unlike Hurlstone). Its long term connection and association with its site means that the school complex demonstrates the progression of buildings, methods, ideas, and technology associated with the development of agricultural education in NSW throughout the twentieth and twenty first centuries. Since its establishment, YAHS has steadily grown, and evolved with educational trends and ideas so that it can deliver a regionally based, boarder only, agricultural education experience for boys and girls that is historically singular and unique in the state context. The fact that YAHS is strongly associated with the history and development of the MIA, as it was originally designed to provide farmers for this scheme, only adds to its historical significance. The way the school is also founded around the McCaughey Mansion and utilises the remnant irrigation works and agricultural landscape of the North Yanco Irrigation Scheme accentuates and deepens it historical connection to irrigation and agricultural in the regional and state sphere.

The place has a strong or special association with a person, or group of persons, of importance of cultural or natural history of New South Wales's history.

YAHS has a strong historical association of state significance with Sir Samuel McCaughey (1835–1919). Sir McCaughey was a successful, prominent, and influential pastoralist and sheep-breeder, innovator of farming technology and equipment, advocate of large-scale irrigation works, philanthropist, and member of the NSW Legislative Council (1899–1919). Without his championing of the benefits, potential, and feasibility of large-scale irrigation schemes and his own personal effort (financing and drive) in demonstrating their effectiveness at North Yanco it is unlikely that the MIA scheme would have been undertaken. His efforts have led him to be remembered in the local region as the "Father of Irrigation". Sir McCaughey's interest and life's work in pastoralism and irrigation is clearly perceptible at YAHS at the McCaughey Mansion (his home from 1902 to 1919), its associated gardens and artificial lake, the two remnant canals, and surrounding agricultural landscape. The McCaughey Mansion also contains two items of movable heritage strongly associated with Sir McCaughey: a life sized portrait by Frederick McCubbin (1901) and his dress sword.

The place is important in demonstrating aesthetic characteristics and/or a high degree of creative or technical achievement in New South Wales.

The McCaughey Mansion is of state technical significance as a unique example of a Federation Arts and Crafts / Free Style mansion constructed in an isolated rural context. Designed by the Sydney architect Herbert E. Ross, this mansion has far more in common with the large mansions erected on the Upper North Shore of Sydney than rural homesteads of this period. As such, this mansion is quite rare in the central and western districts of NSW. For Sir McCaughey it was a clear statement of his wealth and influence that allowed him to transport this type of metropolitan focussed architecture and high craftmanship to an isolated rural context.

The place has a strong or special association with a particular community or cultural group in New South Wales for social, cultural or spiritual reasons.

YAHS is of state social significance for the esteem it is held in by many rural families and communities across south and west NSW. Throughout its long history it has provided a valued education to the children of these families and has played an important educational role in this region. Since 1922 it has been a central boarding school for boys seeking to continue their family farms or move into other areas of the agricultural industry. From 1993 the school has also played an identical role for girls from the same families or those seeking an agricultural education. As such, many families in this region have a long association with the school that transcends generations and has expanded in the last 25 years to include female members. The school has a strong connection with past students through its old students' club, the Old Yanconians' Union (probably formed by the 1930s), who hold annual events at the school and are actively engaged in school life.

The place has potential to yield information that will contribute to an understanding of the cultural or natural history of New South Wales.

The remnant two canal sections (one extant, one archaeological) at YAHS have research potential in a state context for the information they can provide on the first stage of the North Yanco Irrigation Scheme. This private large-scale irrigation scheme was developed by Sir Samuel McCaughey from 1899–1903 to demonstrate the benefits, potential, and feasibility of extensive irrigation works to the people and government of NSW. The irrigation works around the McCaughey Mansion were likely the first constructed in the scheme and likely provide an important archaeological window into the initial methods and ideas used by Sir McCaughey in his irrigation works. These archaeological features could be compared and contrasted with the other remnant channels and irrigation works from the subsequent phases of the scheme preserved across other sections of the former North Yanco Holding. This potentially includes channels and irrigation works incorporated into the MIA that are still functioning today. In this manner, the archaeological remnants of the canal system and irrigation works at YAHS are potentially important archaeological resources in the study of the development of large-scale irrigation systems (and the excavation and pumping technology involved) in NSW.

The buildings, equipment, and archives of the school complex at YAHS have research potential in a state context for the information they can provide on the history and development of agricultural education in NSW. The way buildings from different periods are preserved at YAHS provides a window through which the changing and evolving ideas and thoughts about agricultural education in NSW from the 1920s through to the present can be appreciated. This could be an important resource for any study of agricultural education in NSW.

The place possesses uncommon, rare or endangered aspects of the cultural or natural history of New South Wales.

YAHS is rare in a state context as the commencement site of the first private large-scale irrigation scheme in NSW. This rarity of YAHS is demonstrated by the McCaughey Mansion, its remnant landscaped gardens (including the artificial lake), pump display, agricultural landscape, and two remnant canals. These elements of YAHS are part of the first stage of the North Yanco irrigation scheme (1899–1903). The North Yanco scheme is particularly rare because it was a private enterprise in comparison to the other earlier small government sponsored schemes: the Curlwaa Irrigation Area (1888) and Hay Private Irrigation District (1892–1893).

YAHS is rare in a state context as one of only four agricultural high schools ever established in NSW (Hurlstone (1907), Farrier (1939), and James Ruse (1959)). This rarity of YAHS is demonstrated by the older educational buildings on site and the later occupation phases of the older North Yanco era buildings. YAHS is the second oldest agricultural high school in NSW (established 1922). With the pending closure of the Glenfield site of Hurlstone Agricultural High School (scheduled for 2020) YAHS will soon become the oldest, continually occupied, agricultural high school site in NSW. YAHS's close association with the MIA (and irrigation), rural families in the south and west of NSW, its good condition, wide range of educational agricultural buildings, and isolated rural location strengthens its significance against this criterion.

The McCaughey Mansion is rare in a state context as an unusual example of a Federation Arts and Crafts / Free Style mansion in the central and western districts of NSW. Although modified, the Mansion retains many original features and its character. Its isolated rural context is rare and unusual in a state context as the majority of mansions of this architectural style are confined to the Sydney metropolitan area.

The place is important in demonstrating the principal characteristics of a class of cultural or natural places/environments in New South Wales.

It contains a wide range of agricultural educational buildings and facilities from a variety of periods that display the progression and development of ideas about agricultural education in NSW from the 1920s to the present.

== See also ==
- List of government schools in New South Wales
- List of selective high schools in New South Wales
- List of boarding schools in Australia
