= Yanco Powerhouse Museum =

Local museum in New South Wales, Australia

Coordinates: 34.603488°S 146.407435°E

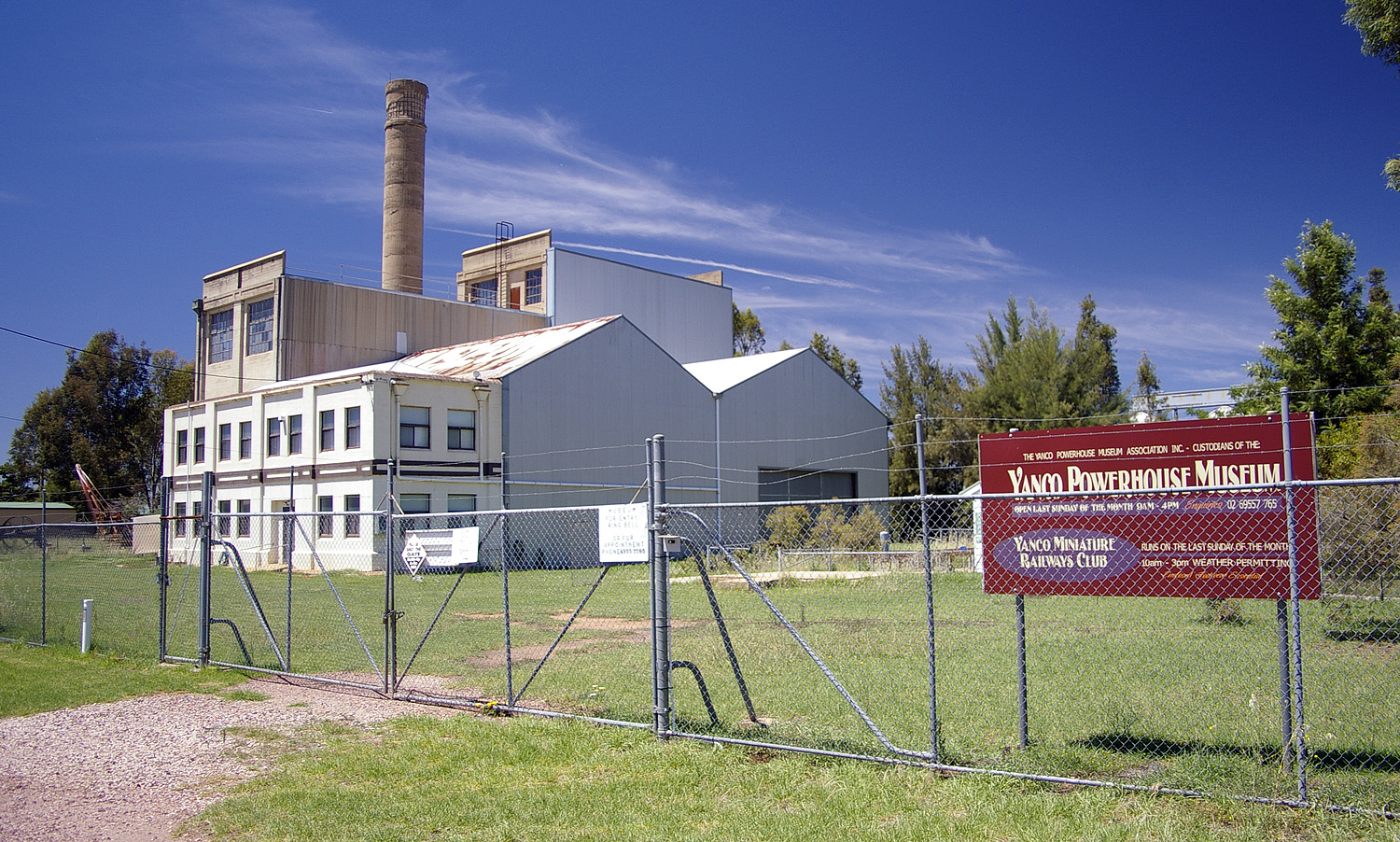
- Location: Yanco, New South Wales, Australia

Yanco Powerhouse Museum is a museum located at Binya Street in Yanco, New South Wales, Australia. It was built in 1913 to supply power to the Murrumbidgee Irrigation Area, when power was required for general lightning and for the Leeton Butter Factory.

The site on which it was constructed was chosen as it was close to the Yanco railway line for obtaining coal and close to a water source that would be used for condensing water using a secondhand 75 KW generator. 6.5 km (4.0 mi) of transmission lines were installed on flexible steel poles, the first of their kind in Australia. The station's construction is concrete. In 1937, the five-story building was extended. It was decommissioned in 1957 when the Snowy Mountains Scheme was completed and hydro-electric power was supplied to the region.

== Collection ==
The museums collection focuses on general aspects of local life including dioramas of life in the early-mid 20th century, a gallery of local historical photos, and a collection of local machinery from farming and industry.
