= George Gibb Nicholson =

English-born Australian philologist and professor

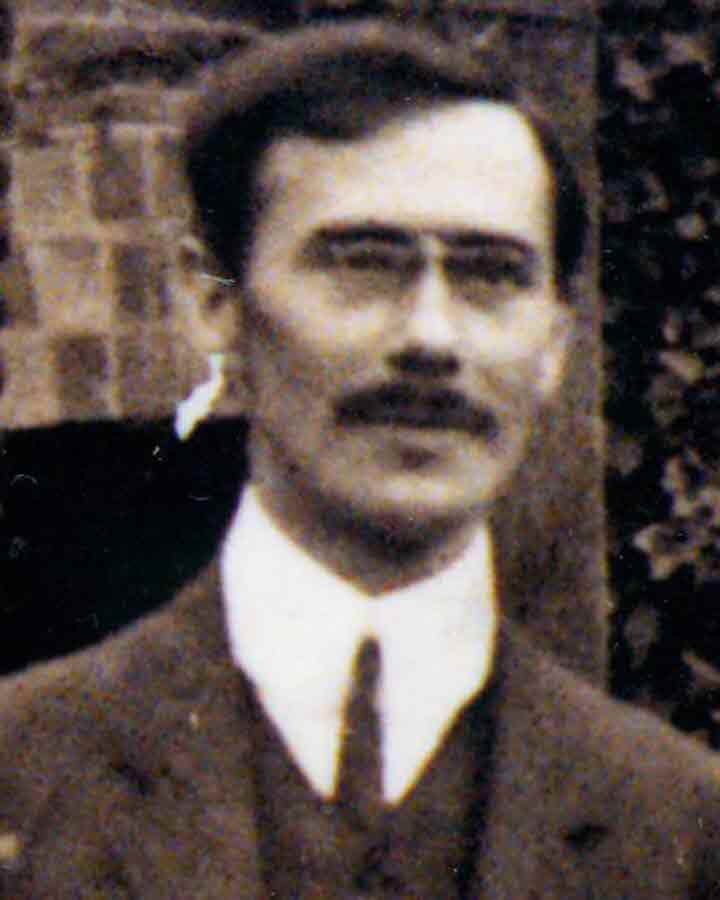
- Born: 20 September 1875; Chorlton-cum-Hardy, United Kingdom
- Died: 22 December 1948 (aged 73); Hunters Hill, New South Wales, Australia

Academic background
- Education: University of Sydney; Balliol College, Oxford (B.C.L.)

Academic work
- Discipline: Philologist
- Sub-discipline: French language
- Institutions: University of Sydney
- Notable works: A Practical Introduction to French Phonetics; Recherches Philologiques Romanes; Un nouveau principe d'étymologie romane

George Gibb Nicholson CBE (1875–1948), often referred to as G. G. Nicholson, was an English-born Australian philologist and professor of French. He was the inaugural McCaughey Professor of French at University of Sydney.

== Early life and education ==
George Nicholson was born on 20 September 1875 in Chorlton-cum-Hardy, England. His parents were Donald Nicholson, a cashier, and Euphemia Scott, née Gibb, who had at one time run a private school in Aberdeen, Scotland.

The family emigrated to Australia, arriving in Melbourne in February 1884 and settling in Launceston, Tasmania in April of that year. His father took up a position as a bank manager working for the National Bank of Tasmania and his mother was appointed as principal of the Launceston Training College, which the young Nicholson also attended as a student.

Having matriculated from secondary school and won a Lithgow Scholarship in modern languages (French and German) in 1896, George Nicholson studied at the University of Sydney from which he graduated in 1899, achieving first-class honours in English, French and German and receiving the University Medal, Professor Anderson's prize and Professor McCallum's prize for English.

Nicholson next attended Balliol College, Oxford. His studies there included law and he graduated in 1902 with a B.C.L. degree. During his holidays he toured France by bicycle and practised his spoken French. He later attended lectures at the Sorbonne.

== University of Sydney ==
In 1903 Nicholson returned to Australia and was appointed assistant lecturer in French and German at the University of Sydney in the department headed by Professor Mungo William MacCallum. He also taught philosophy for two years at the University's St Andrew's College.

In 1913 he was promoted to assistant professor. During the First World War he worked as assistant censor and then district censor. In 1920 he graduated as a Master of Arts.

== McCaughey Professor of French ==
In 1921 Nicholson was appointed as the foundation McCaughey Professor of French, a position that had been created in 1920 following a bequest of £458,000 from the pastoralist Sir Samuel McCaughey to the University of Sydney.

During the coming years, beginning with the publication of his Recherches Philologiques Romanes (1921) and following up with Un nouveau principe d'étymologie romane (1936) and papers in foreign academic journals, he developed an "international reputation as a philologist". His views on philology, however, inspired some controversy and he was accused, for example, of not putting enough emphasis on linguistic geography. However, later commentators have argued that his challenges to "traditional etymologies" were justified.

Nicholson was an "exacting" teacher who was known for enforcing academic rigour, a habit that some have interpreted as shading into "linguistic pedantry". One student recalled his marks for translation ranging as low as theta minus and that "a misplaced comma was a sin".

In his early years of teaching at Sydney University, Nicholson was an advocate of the "direct method" of language learning, which aimed to replace the translation-grammar method with a greater emphasis on using the foreign language as the medium for instruction. Once he became a professor, he continued to emphasise accurate pronunciation and regular contact with the living language via native speakers of French. However, he also returned the older, more traditional view of "language learning as a mental discipline".

He was generous and helpful to students who sought his advice and "always followed up the post-university careers of his successful students".

Nicholson was vocal in publicly advocating for higher educational standards at all levels and in calling for more resources and staff in the modern languages section of the teachers colleges.

He personally lobbied for funds to promote the teaching of French. This included a successful call in 1922 for French government scholarships which would enable Sydney University "students to travel to Paris ... to continue their studies".

During World War II he worked briefly as chief censor.

In 1945, after almost a quarter of a century as McCaughey Professor, he retired from the position and was appointed Professor Emeritus. He was succeeded as McCaughey Professor by Ian Henning.

== Legacy ==
Nicholson's professorial appointment was the first to a modern language chair in any Australian university, modern language courses previously having been, as at Sydney, under the aegis of the English or Classics departments. A. C. Chisholm, Professor of French at the University of Melbourne, argued that he "put French on the academic map in Australia" and placed it "on the same scholarly level as Classics".

During Nicholson's long tenure coupled with his influence on his cohorts of graduates and his active membership of the Modern Languages Association (together with colleagues such as Eban Gowrie Waterhouse, Professor of German at Sydney University), French and German became more widely taught both at the secondary and tertiary levels and chairs of French were for the first time established in major Australian universities including the University of Melbourne (1938) and University of Adelaide (1944).

Although a proponent of the translation-grammar method of teaching, he also promoted the importance of modern languages as living languages in which the spoken word and oral proficiency must also be mastered.

In a 1991 review of Nicholson's work, methods and influence, Monash University's Professor Wallace Kirsop concluded: "At a time when one can wonder whether traditional scholarship will have to look for survival outside universities, the unbending position of Nicholson... is a tremendous comfort and inspiration."

== Personal life ==
In 1905 Nicholson married Geneva-born Marguerite Marie Danuser (1874–1961). They had one daughter, Marguerite Marie Nicholson (1907–2001), and a son, Donald Andre Nicholson (1911–1994).

From 1905 and for the rest of his life he resided with his family in the Sydney suburb of Hunters Hill.

He died on 22 December 1948.

== Awards ==
- C.B.E. (1920)
- Chevalier de la Légion d'Honneur (1934)

== Select bibliography ==
- A Practical Introduction to French Phonetics for the Use of English-Speaking Students and Teachers (London: Macmillan, 1909)
- Passages for Translation into French and German (co-authored with C. J. Brennan) (London: Oxford University Press, 1914)
- Recherches Philologiques Romanes (Paris: Librairie Ancienne Honoré Champion, 1921)
- Etudes étymologiques (Paris: Macon, Protat, 1929)
- Adverbes romanes issus de conjonctions (Paris: Macon, 1930)
- Un nouveau principe d'étymologie romane (Paris: E. Droz, 1936)
