= Yanco =

- Town
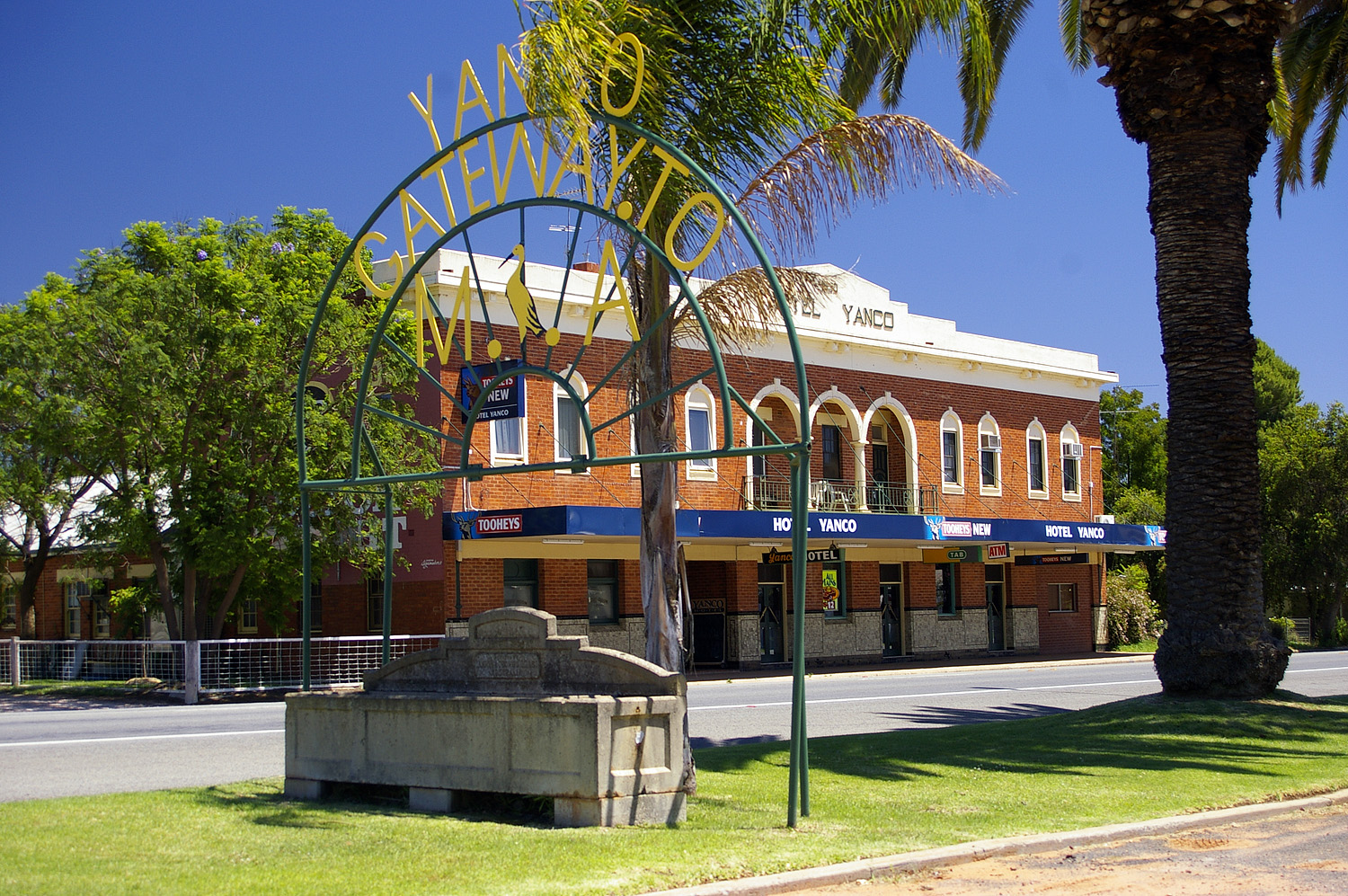
- Yanco Hotel, welcome sign and a Bills horse trough

- Coordinates: 34°36′0″S 146°24′0″E
- Country: Australia
- State: New South Wales
- LGA: Leeton Shire
- Location: 3 km (1.9 mi) from Leeton

Government
  - State electorate: Murray
  - Federal division: Farrer
- Elevation: 164 m (538 ft)

Population
  - Total: 432 (UCL 2021)
- Postcode: 2703
- County: Cooper
- Parish: Yarangery
- Mean max temp: 24.2 °C (75.6 °F)
- Mean min temp: 11.4 °C (52.5 °F)
- Annual rainfall: 423.9 mm (16.69 in)

Yanco is a village in Leeton Shire in south western New South Wales, Australia. Yanco is a Wiradjuri aboriginal language word meaning the sound of running water. Yanco is located 3 kilometres (1.9 mi) from Leeton along Irrigation Way. Yanco is home to the Powerhouse Museum, McCaughey Park, Murrumbidgee Rural Studies Centre and Yanco Agricultural High School. Murrumbidgee Irrigation builds the Roach’s Surge Reservoir near Yanco, holding up to 5 million tonnes of water.

Yanco North Post Office opened on 1 March 1888. It was renamed Yanko in 1892 and Yanco in 1928.

== Geography ==
=== Climate ===
Yanco experiences a warm temperate semi-arid climate (Köppen: BSk/BSh) with hot summers, quite mild winters and relatively low precipitation year-round. The wettest recorded day was 4 March 2012 with 175.2 mm (6.90 in) of rainfall. Extreme temperatures ranged from 46.1 °C (115.0 °F) on 10 February 2017 to −3.0 °C (26.6 °F) on 22 June 2007.

Climate data for Yanco Agricultural Institute (34.62°S 146.43°E) (164 m (538 ft) AMSL) (1975–2025)
Month	Jan	Feb	Mar	Apr	May	Jun	Jul	Aug	Sep	Oct	Nov	Dec	Year
Record high °C (°F)	45.6 (114.1)	46.1 (115.0)	41.6 (106.9)	37.4 (99.3)	29.6 (85.3)	24.0 (75.2)	22.0 (71.6)	30.0 (86.0)	37.5 (99.5)	38.6 (101.5)	43.3 (109.9)	43.3 (109.9)	46.1 (115.0)
Mean daily maximum °C (°F)	33.9 (93.0)	32.6 (90.7)	29.2 (84.6)	24.3 (75.7)	19.1 (66.4)	15.1 (59.2)	14.6 (58.3)	16.5 (61.7)	20.6 (69.1)	24.8 (76.6)	28.7 (83.7)	31.3 (88.3)	24.2 (75.6)
Mean daily minimum °C (°F)	18.8 (65.8)	18.2 (64.8)	15.6 (60.1)	11.7 (53.1)	7.7 (45.9)	5.6 (42.1)	4.8 (40.6)	5.4 (41.7)	7.6 (45.7)	10.6 (51.1)	14.2 (57.6)	16.3 (61.3)	11.4 (52.5)
Record low °C (°F)	8.7 (47.7)	8.2 (46.8)	6.0 (42.8)	2.8 (37.0)	0.0 (32.0)	−3.0 (26.6)	−1.8 (28.8)	−2.8 (27.0)	−0.6 (30.9)	1.0 (33.8)	3.0 (37.4)	5.9 (42.6)	−3.0 (26.6)
Average precipitation mm (inches)	32.9 (1.30)	30.6 (1.20)	36.3 (1.43)	32.0 (1.26)	37.9 (1.49)	36.6 (1.44)	35.3 (1.39)	37.4 (1.47)	38.0 (1.50)	39.1 (1.54)	35.1 (1.38)	32.7 (1.29)	423.9 (16.69)
Average precipitation days (≥ 0.2 mm)	4.8	4.0	5.0	5.5	8.4	11.7	13.0	11.7	9.3	7.5	6.4	5.7	93
Average afternoon relative humidity (%)	23	30	30	37	45	61	60	52	43	33	29	27	39
Average dew point °C (°F)	6.3 (43.3)	9.0 (48.2)	7.2 (45.0)	6.4 (43.5)	5.7 (42.3)	6.6 (43.9)	5.6 (42.1)	4.6 (40.3)	5.1 (41.2)	3.8 (38.8)	4.8 (40.6)	5.1 (41.2)	5.9 (42.5)
Source: Bureau of Meteorology (1975–2025)

== Demographics ==
At the 2016 census Yanco had a population of 506. That had dropped to 432 at the 2021 census.

== Football ==
The town has a team in the Group 20 Rugby League competition with neighbouring village Wamoon, the Yanco-Wamoon Hawks. They are renowned for winning five successive titles from 1992 to 1996, a competition record. The club briefly merged with rivals Narrandera from 2012 to 2014 as the Bidgee Hurricanes, but the sides demerged ahead of the 2015 season. They play at the Yanco Sports Ground, a picturesque oval located across the railway and irrigation channel from the town centre.

The town had a defunct Australian Rules Football team, the Yanco Penguins, which played in the South West District Football League and Barellan & District Football League before folding in 1971. The Whitton Football Club of the Farrer Football League briefly changed its name to Whitton-Yanco in the early 1990s, however the Yanco part of the name was dropped when the club merged with Leeton in 1995.

== Heritage listings ==
Yanco has a number of heritage-listed sites, including:

- Yanco Weir
- 259 Euroley Road: Yanco Agricultural High School

Preceding station	Former services	Following station
Leeton towards Griffith	Griffith–Yanco Line	Terminus
Gogeldrie towards Hay	Hay Line	Narrandera towards Junee
