= Nubba, New South Wales =

Nubba
- Suburb
- Coordinates: 34°32′S 148°14′E
- Country: Australia
- State: New South Wales
- LGA: Hilltops Council
- Location: 10 km (6.2 mi) NW of Murrumburrah

Government
  - State electorate: Cootamundra
  - Federal division: Riverina

Population
  - Total: 77 (SAL 2021)
- Postcode: 2587

Nubba is a locality and former railway station on the Main South railway line in New South Wales, Australia, located midway between Wallendbeen and Harden. The station was open between 1882 and 1975 and has now been demolished.

Nubba is also a civil parish of Harden County, New South Wales.

Prime Minister Harold Holt's paternal grandparents owned a large farming property near Nubba. As a child, he lived there for a brief period and attended the local state school, Nubba Public School.

At the 2006 census, Nubba had a population of 281 people. By 2016 that had fallen to 76, then increased by one to 77 at the 2021 census.

Preceding station	Former services	Following station
Wallendbeen towards Albury	Main Southern Line	Demondrille towards Sydney
