= J. H. M. Abbott =

Australian novelist and poet

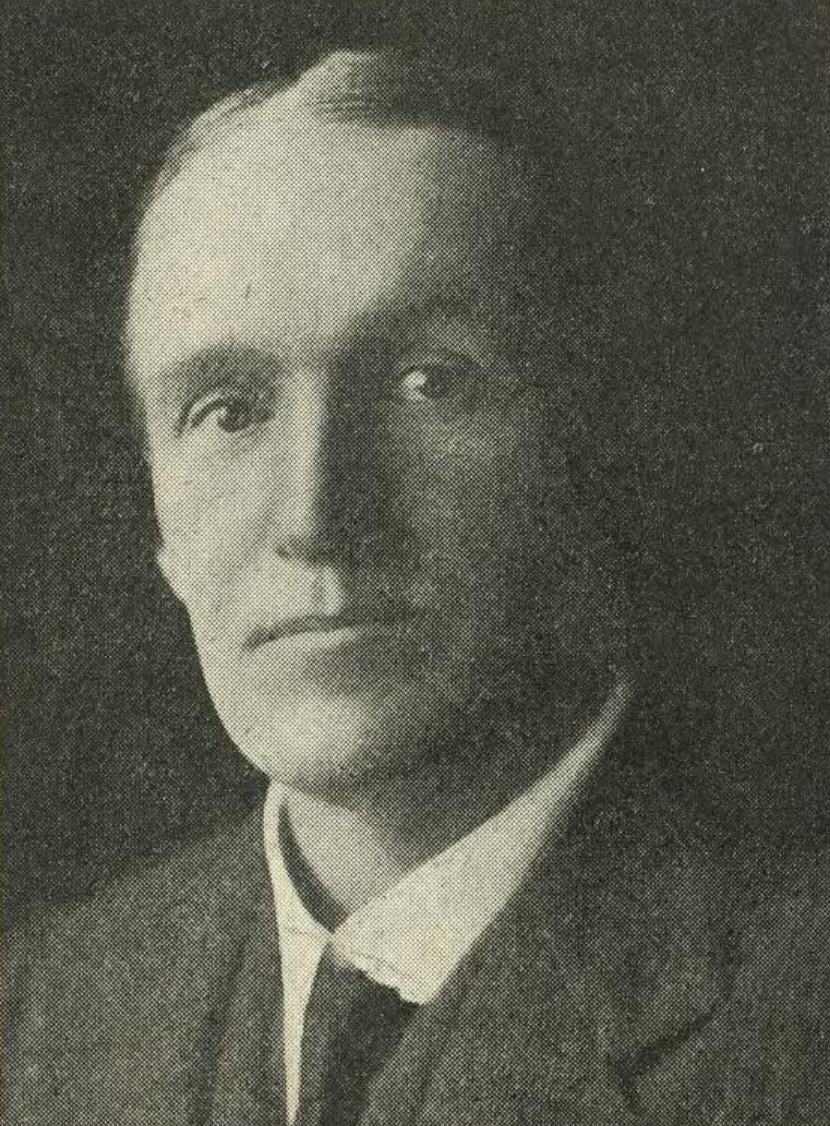
- Born: John Henry Macartney Abbott; 26 December 1874; Haydonton, New South Wales
- Died: 12 August 1953 (aged 78); Rydalmere, New South Wales
- Occupation: writer
- Writing career
- Language: English
- Notable work: Tommy Cornstalk

John Henry Macartney Abbott (26 December 1874 – 12 August 1953) was an Australian novelist and poet.

== Early life ==
Abbott was born in Haydonton, Murrurundi, New South Wales in 1874. He was the eldest son of son of (Sir) Joseph Palmer Abbott and his first wife Matilda Elizabeth, née Macartney. He was educated at The King's School, Parramatta and then attended classes at the University of Sydney before returning to the family property to work as a jackaroo. He published his first verse in The Bulletin in 1897.

In January 1900 he left Australia for the Boer War where he served as a corporal in the 1st Australian Horse, and later as a second lieutenant in the Royal Field Artillery, but was invalided back to Australia in October 1900. He utilised his experiences in the war to write Tommy Cornstalk (1902), the success of which convinced him to move to London to work as a journalist. He returned to Australia in 1909 and worked for the next 40 years as a writer of novels, poetry and prose pieces for various newspapers and periodicals.

According to Miller and Macartney,

His writings consist mainly of novels and short stories of a simple kind, without subtleties or motive or characterization, against a background of the Australian past as revealed by historical records, and introducing actual personages.

Abbott died in the Rydalmere Mental Hospital of vascular disease on 12 August 1953.

== Bibliography ==
Caricature by David Low

=== Novels ===
- Plain and Veldt : being studies, stories and sketches of my own people, in peace and at war (1903)
- Letters from Queer Street: being some of the correspondence of the late Mr John Mason (1908)
- The Sign of the Serpent (1910)
- Castle Vane : A Romance of Bushranging on the Upper Hunter in the Olden Days (1916)
- Sally : The Tale of a Currency Lass (1918)
- The Governor's Man (1919)
- Sydney Cove : A Romance of the First Fleet (1920)
- Ensign Calder (1922)
- Red O'Shaughnessy (1935)

=== Essays ===
- Out of the Past (1944)

=== Short stories ===
- The King's School and Other Tales for Old Boys (1931)

=== Children's fiction ===
- Abbott, John Henry (1911). The Story of William Dampier. Sydney: Angus & Robertson. OCLC 37051296. Wikidata Q126678335.
- Dogsnose (1928)

=== Autobiography ===
- Tommy Cornstalk : Being Some Account of the Less Notable Features of the South African War from the Point of View of the Australian Ranks (1902)
