= Harden, New South Wales =

Harden
- Town
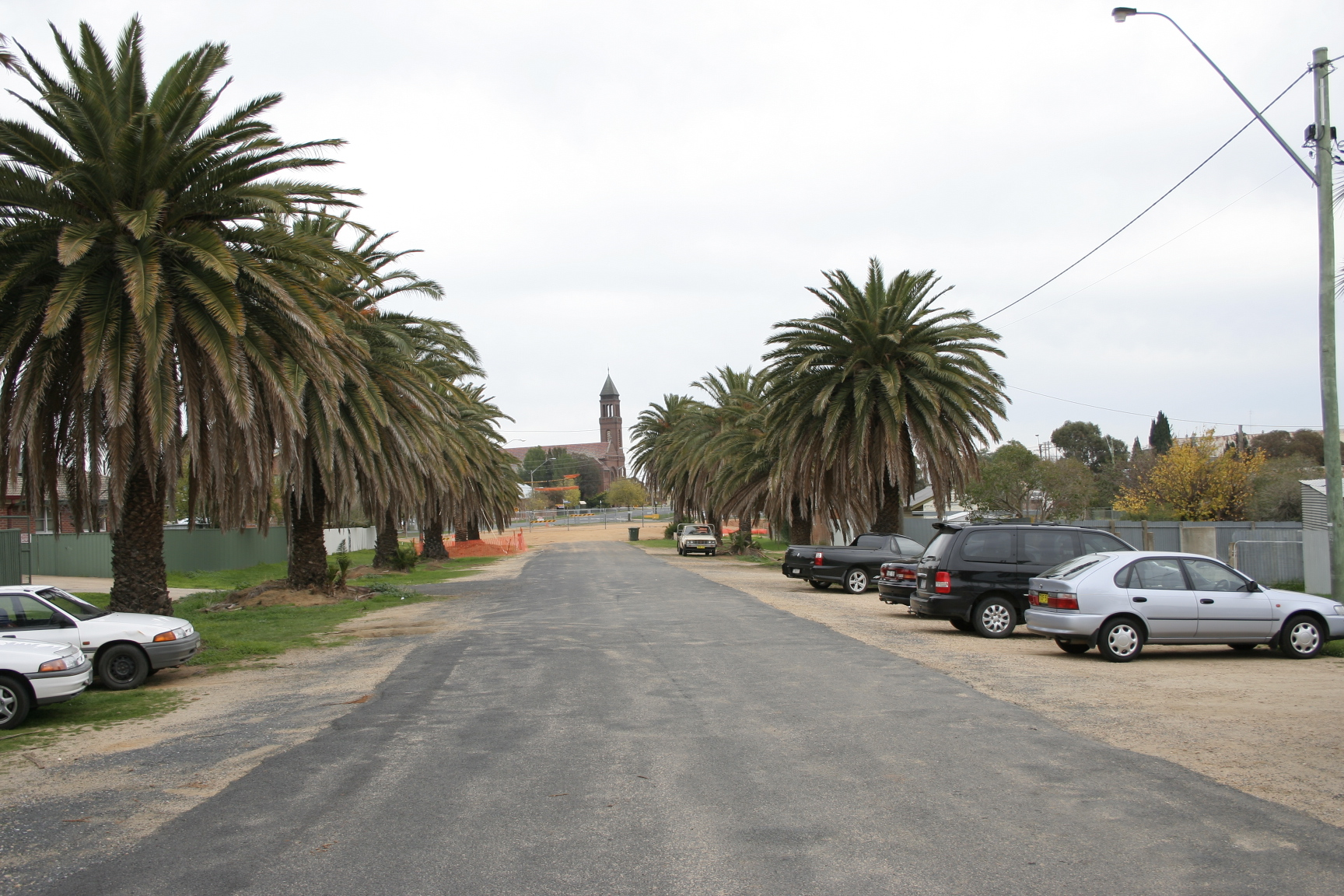

- Coordinates: 34°33′11″S 148°21′46″E
- Country: Australia
- State: New South Wales
- LGA: Hilltops Council
- Location: 341 km (212 mi) WSW of Sydney; 125 km (78 mi) NW of Canberra; 128 km (80 mi) NE of Wagga Wagga; 64 km (40 mi) WNW of Yass; 33 km (21 mi) S of Young

Government
  - State electorate: Cootamundra
  - Federal division: Riverina
- Elevation: 431 m (1,414 ft)

Population
  - Total: 1,900 (SAL 2021)
- Postcode: 2587
- Mean max temp: 21.7 °C (71.1 °F)
- Mean min temp: 7.4 °C (45.3 °F)
- Annual rainfall: 609.1 mm (23.98 in)

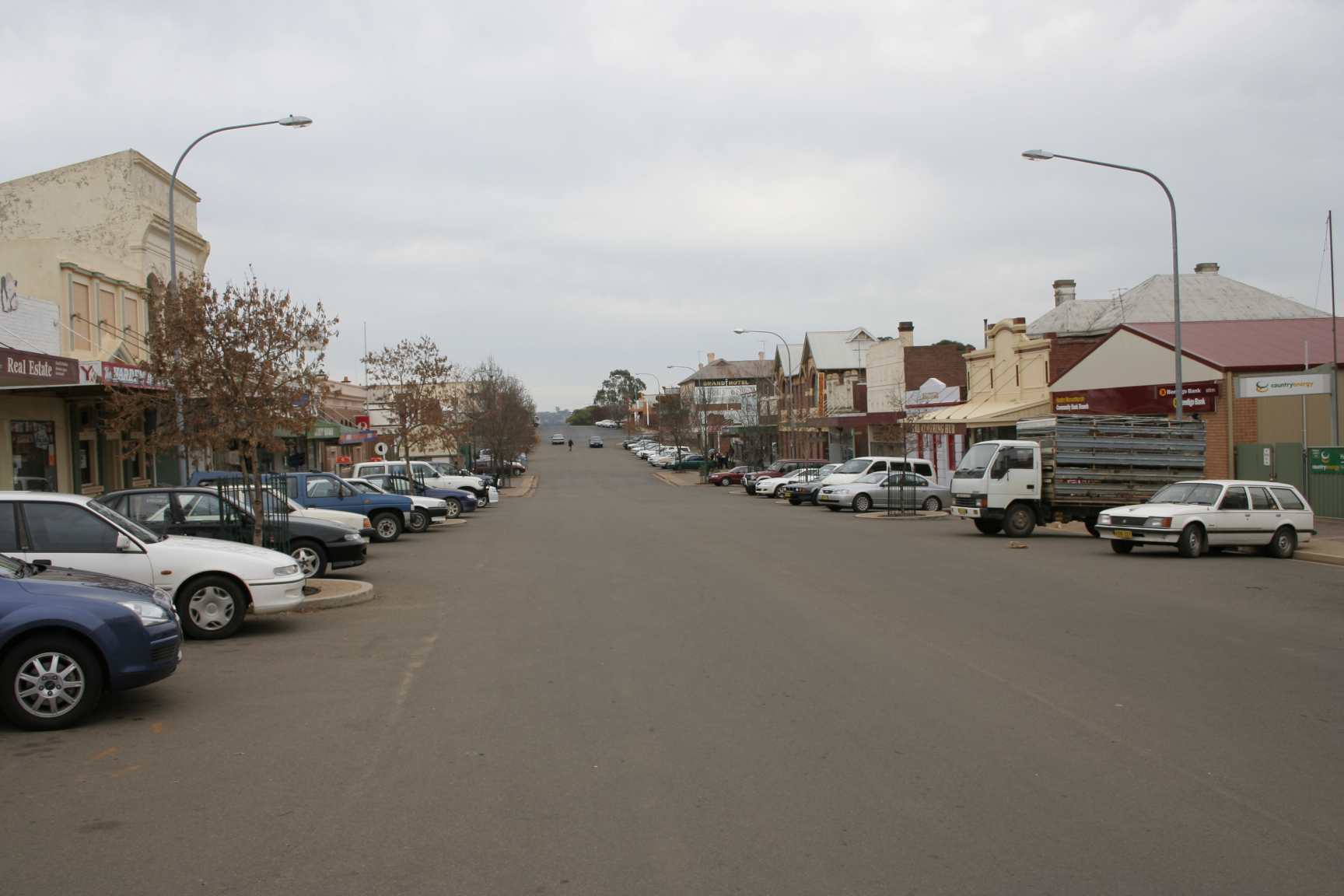
Main street

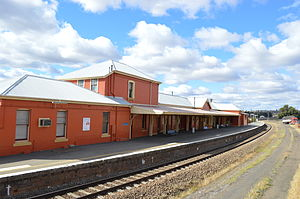
Harden railway station

Harden–Murrumburrah is a town and community in the Hilltops Region and is located in the South West Slopes of New South Wales in Australia. Harden is adjacent to both the Canberra region of the Australian Capital Territory and the Riverina Region in the southwest area of NSW. The town is a twin town between Harden and Murrumburrah (which is noted as one of the earliest European immigrant settlements in the southwest of New South Wales).

The town is traversed by the Burley Griffin Way, the major link from and between the Riverina and the Hume Highway near Yass, and ultimately Sydney, Canberra and the coast. Cunningham Creek runs along the edge of the town.

The Olympic Highway traverses the western end of the shire and is the major link through the central west to the Blue Mountains and from there to the Sydney region.

Harden is 3½ hours away by road from Sydney, and 1½ hours from Canberra and Wagga Wagga.

== History ==
Before European settlement the Harden area was inhabited by the Wiradjuri people. Hume and Hovell passed nearby in 1824. In the late 1820s, the 'Murrumburra' was established. Its superintendent, James Kennedy, established an inn on the townsite in the late 1840s. Gold was found in the area in the 1850s.

Harden railway station was opened one km east of Murrumburrah on the Main Southern line in 1877 as Murrumburrah, but changed its name to Harden a year after the opening of a new station in Murrumburrah in 1879. Harden has remained as the main station and, as a result, became the main town.

A post office at Harden was opened on 1 January 1870, and in 1926 £2000 of funding was secured to provide extensive improvements to the ageing facility.

The first Australian Lighthorse was also founded in Harden–Murrumburrah, with the Lighthorse festival occurring annually.

From 1906 until 2016 Harden–Murrumburrah was the seat of its own local council, but was amalgamated in 2016 to form Hilltops Council. The town's rugby league team, the Harden-Murrumburrah Hawks, competed for the Maher Cup, and continue to compete in senior football today in the George Tooke Shield.

In 1996, a trust was formed through the last will and testament of Geoffrey Kruger, a retired dental surgeon who had lived in the town for much of his life, the Kruger Trust was intended to fund improvements to the town itself. The trust has funded key infrastructure in the town, such as a medical centre and a community country club.

Harden is also home to Murrumburrah High School, which was established in 1977 and is currently the only secondary education facility for the town.

== Facilities ==
Harden boasts a variety of facilities servicing residents from both Harden, Murrumburrah and surrounds.

- Harden-Murrumburrah & District War Memorial Pool; containing a 50-metre Olympic swimming pool as well as two smaller wading pools.
- Harden Post Office
- Hilltops Council Library Harden Branch located inside the Trinity Centre.
- Kruger Medical Centre, a healthcare facility with general practitioners providing healthcare for chronic disease management, as well as family medicine, women's health and mental health.
- Murrumburrah High School; a secondary education facility.
- Murrumburrah-Harden Health Service, a small hospital facility with 33 beds including 13 hospital care beds and 20 residential aged care beds. The facility sits under the Murrumbidgee Local Health District.

== Climate ==
Harden experiences a climate typical of the South West Slopes, with a large seasonal variation throughout the year. Under Koppen it is classified as a humid subtropical climate (Köppen: Cfa) with warm to hot summers and cool, cloudy winters. On rare occasions it may snow.

Temperature data were collected from 1967 until 1980, and rainfall from 1886 until 2006.

Climate data for Harden (East St, 1967–1980, rainfall 1886–2006); 430 m AMSL; 34.56° S, 148.37° E
Month	Jan	Feb	Mar	Apr	May	Jun	Jul	Aug	Sep	Oct	Nov	Dec	Year
Record high °C (°F)	41.8 (107.2)	41.7 (107.1)	36.5 (97.7)	30.6 (87.1)	26.1 (79.0)	21.5 (70.7)	19.5 (67.1)	25.0 (77.0)	29.5 (85.1)	34.6 (94.3)	36.1 (97.0)	40.0 (104.0)	41.8 (107.2)
Mean daily maximum °C (°F)	30.4 (86.7)	30.4 (86.7)	27.4 (81.3)	22.2 (72.0)	17.0 (62.6)	14.0 (57.2)	13.0 (55.4)	14.6 (58.3)	17.4 (63.3)	21.5 (70.7)	25.0 (77.0)	29.1 (84.4)	21.8 (71.3)
Mean daily minimum °C (°F)	14.5 (58.1)	15.0 (59.0)	12.3 (54.1)	7.7 (45.9)	4.4 (39.9)	1.9 (35.4)	1.0 (33.8)	2.2 (36.0)	3.7 (38.7)	6.8 (44.2)	9.1 (48.4)	11.9 (53.4)	7.5 (45.6)
Record low °C (°F)	4.5 (40.1)	5.7 (42.3)	2.0 (35.6)	−3.0 (26.6)	−5.0 (23.0)	−5.0 (23.0)	−6.9 (19.6)	−7.5 (18.5)	−3.5 (25.7)	−1.5 (29.3)	1.0 (33.8)	2.5 (36.5)	−7.5 (18.5)
Average rainfall mm (inches)	50.7 (2.00)	42.2 (1.66)	50.0 (1.97)	45.7 (1.80)	46.3 (1.82)	58.1 (2.29)	53.1 (2.09)	53.4 (2.10)	53.1 (2.09)	58.4 (2.30)	47.1 (1.85)	49.6 (1.95)	607.7 (23.92)
Average rainy days (≥ 0.2 mm)	5.2	4.6	4.8	5.5	7.1	9.6	10.6	10.3	8.8	8.3	6.4	5.3	86.5
Source: Australian Bureau of Meteorology

== Heritage listings ==
Harden has a number of heritage-listed sites, including:

- Main Southern railway: Harden railway station

== Population ==
According to the 2016 census of population, there were 2,030 people in Harden. At the 2021 census, this had dropped to 1,900 people.

- Aboriginal and Torres Strait Islander people made up 8.7% of the population.
- 84.6% of people were born in Australia and 90.7% of people only spoke English at home.
- The most common responses for religion were Catholic 31.3%, No Religion 24.9% and Anglican 24.6%.

== Transport ==
The Main Southern railway line passes through Harden. It became an important railway town with the line to Blayney branching off a few kilometres beyond Harden at Demondrille. Harden railway station is served by two daily NSW TrainLink XPT services between Melbourne and Sydney in each direction and the twice weekly Xplorer service between Griffith and Sydney. NSW TrainLink trial road coach services 703 and 704 between Wagga Wagga and Canberra via Cootamundra pass through Harden, but as at September 2019 do not pick up or drop off passengers there. Busabout Wagga Wagga have a depot in the town.

== Gallery ==
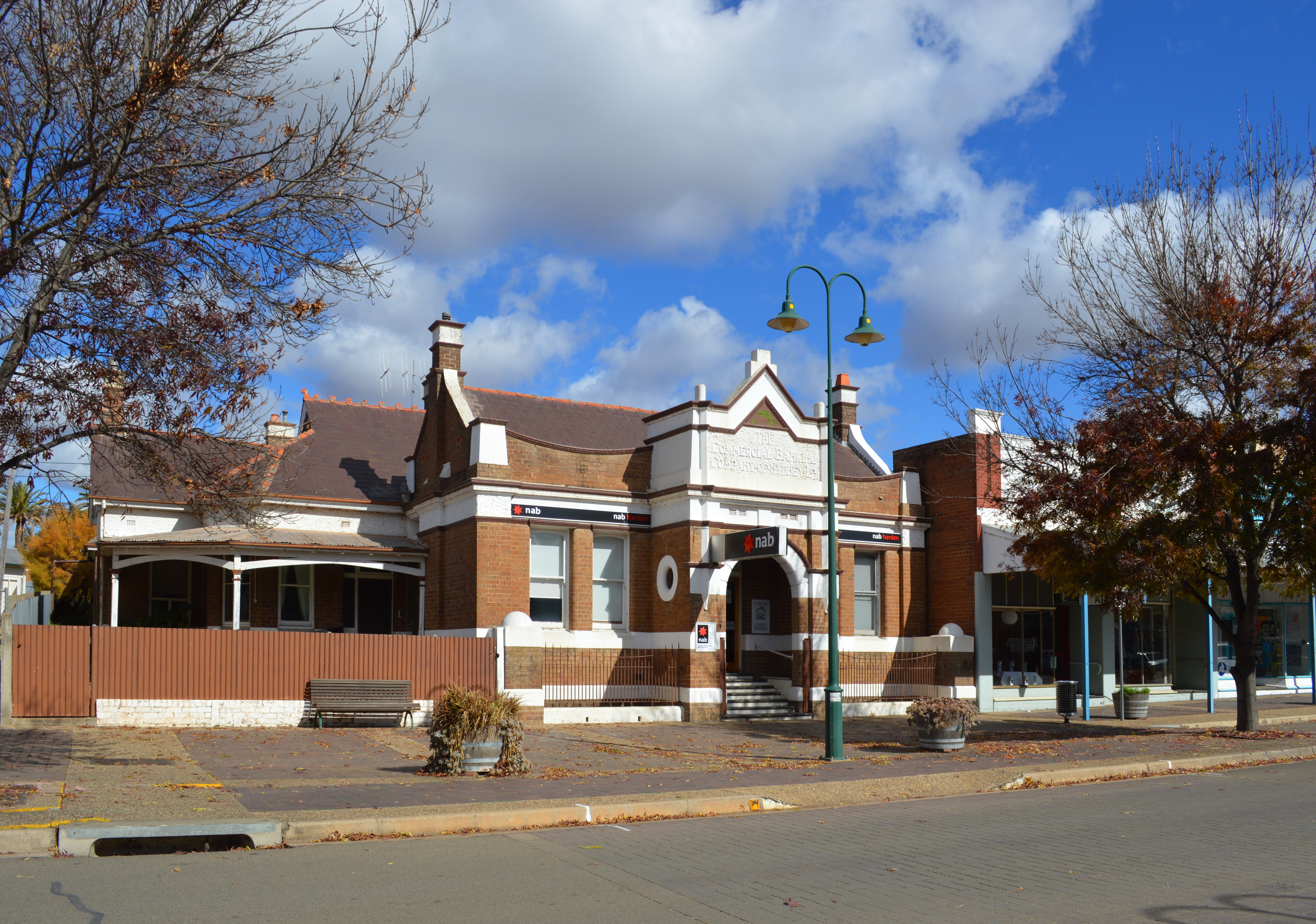
Harden National Australia Bank

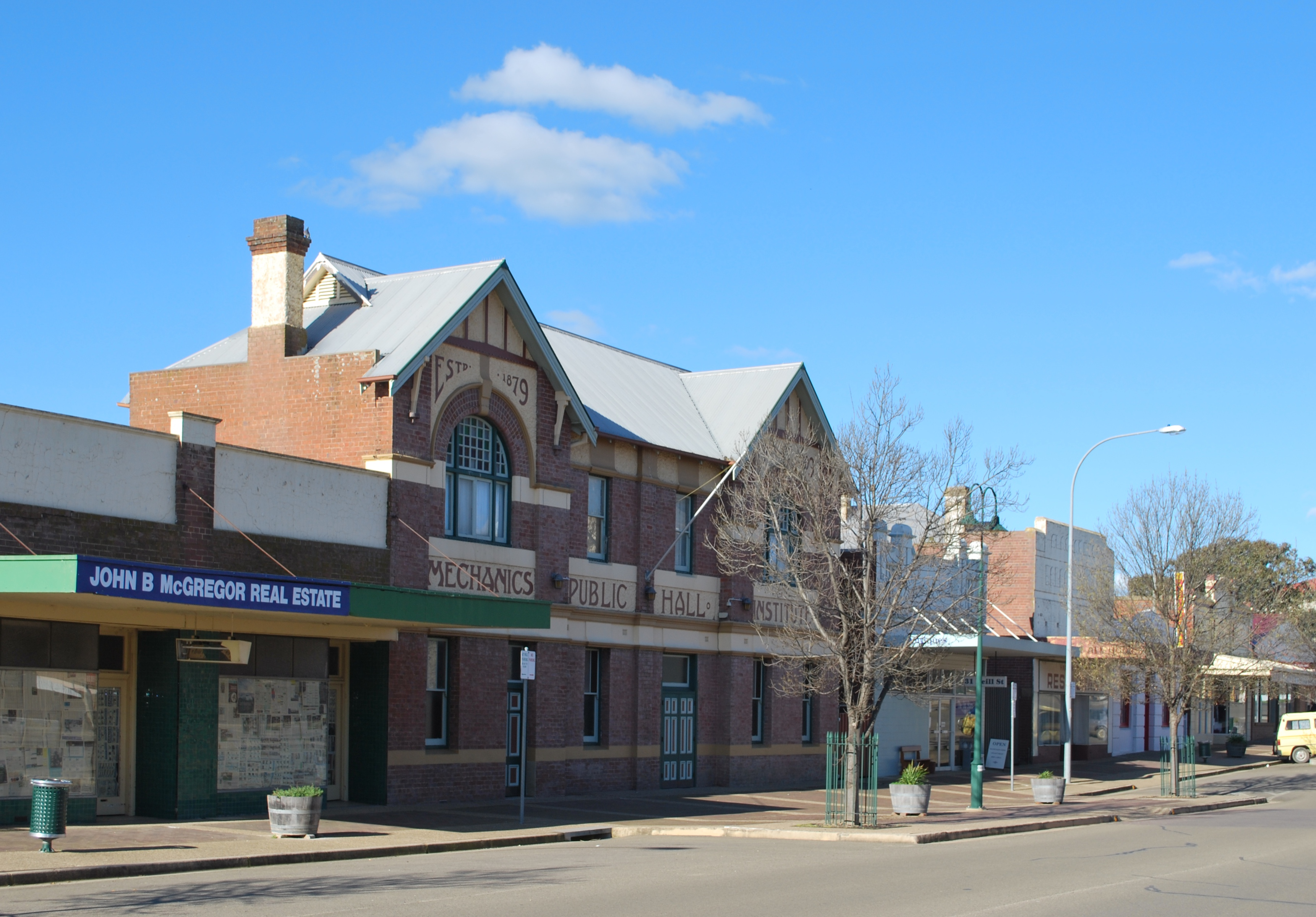
Harden Mechanics Institute

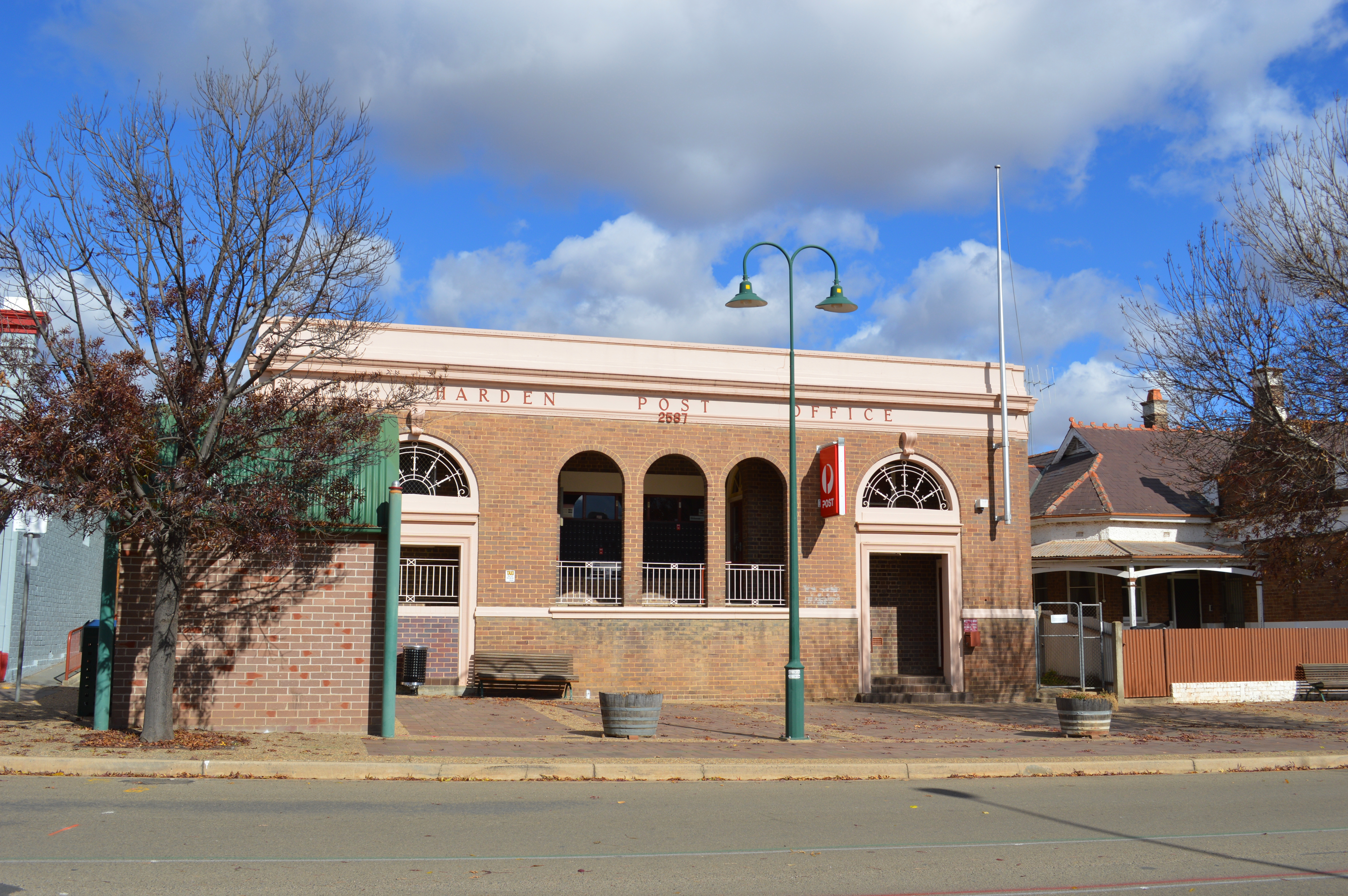
Harden Post office

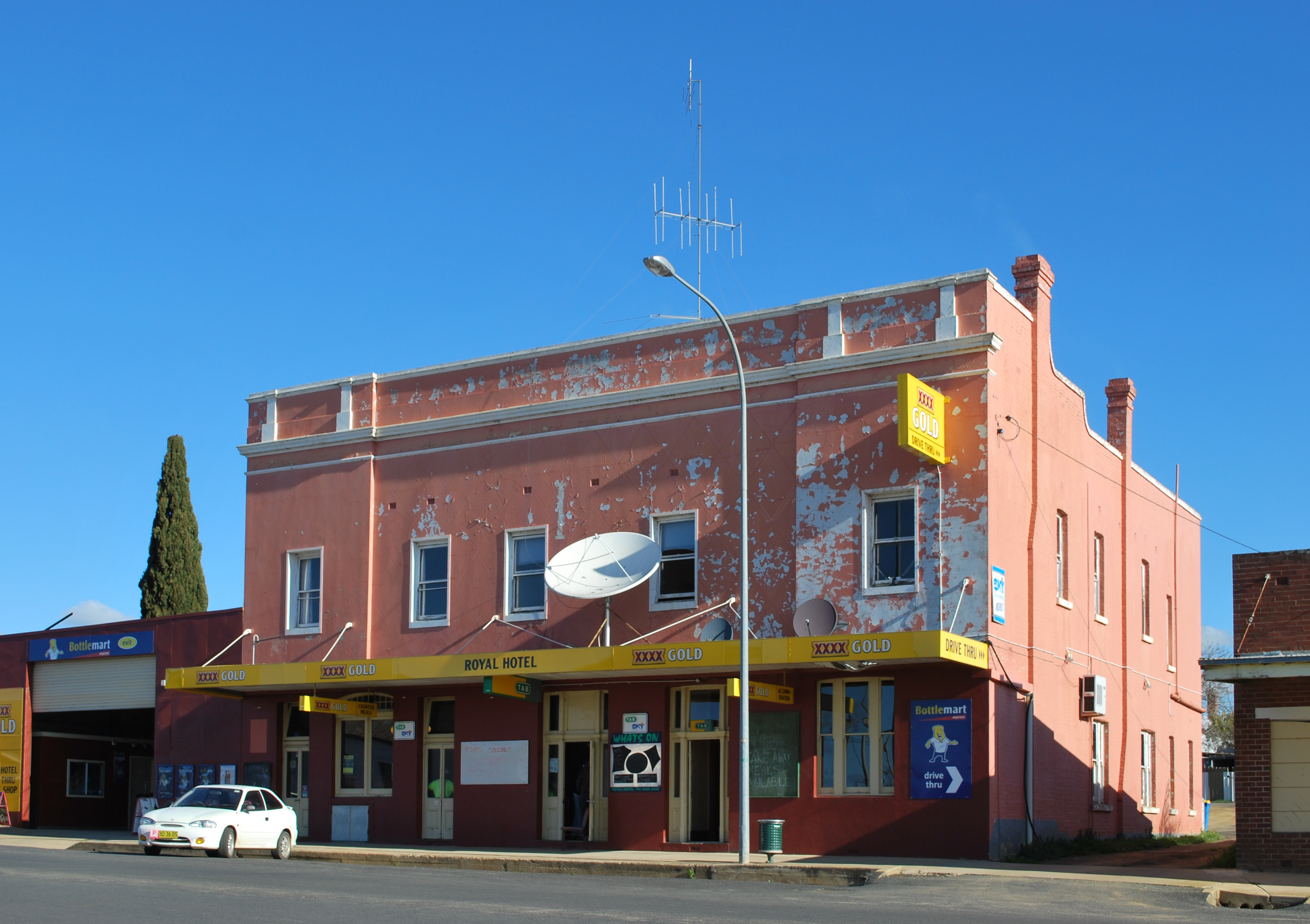
Royal Hotel

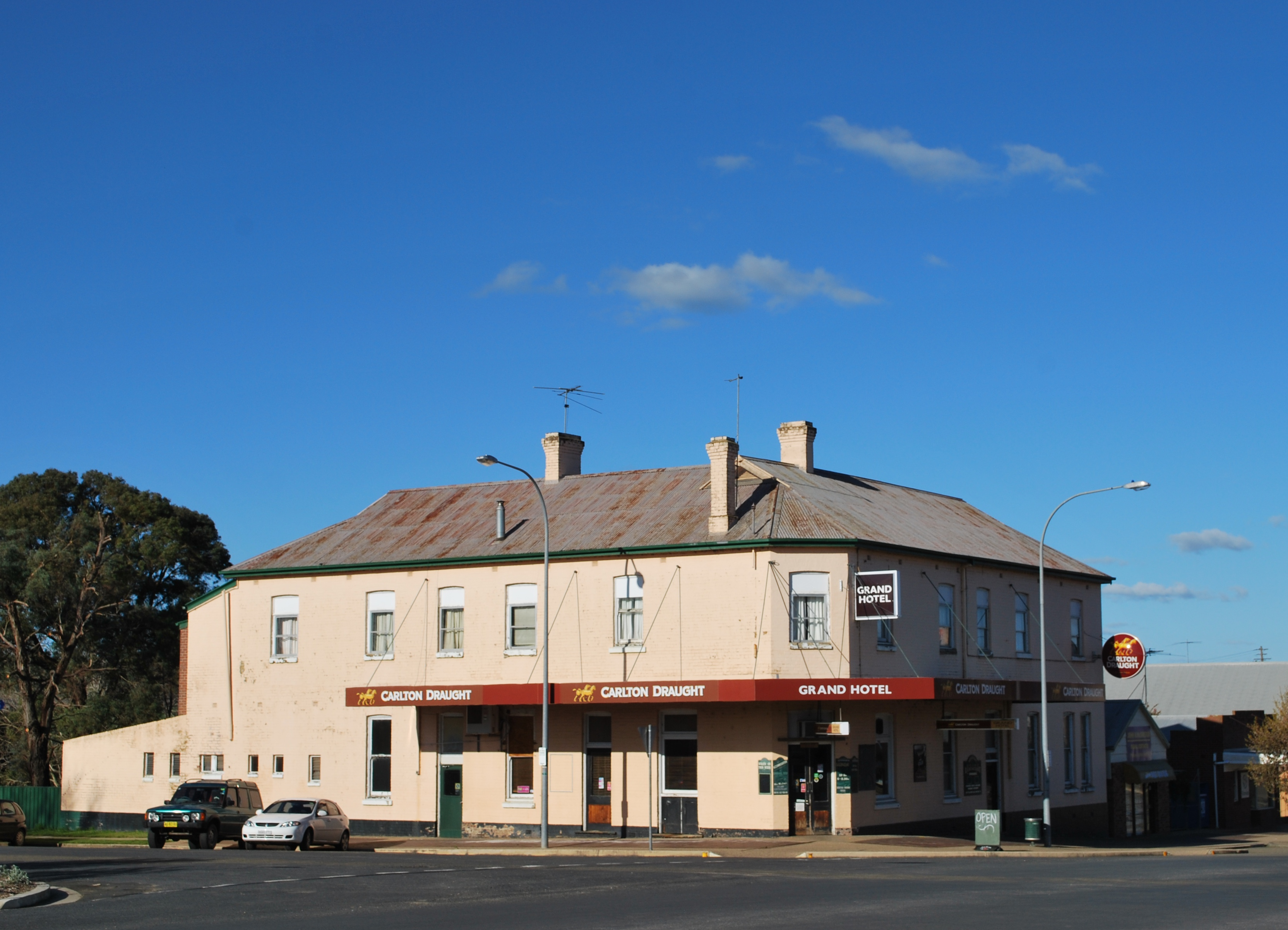
Grand Hotel Harden

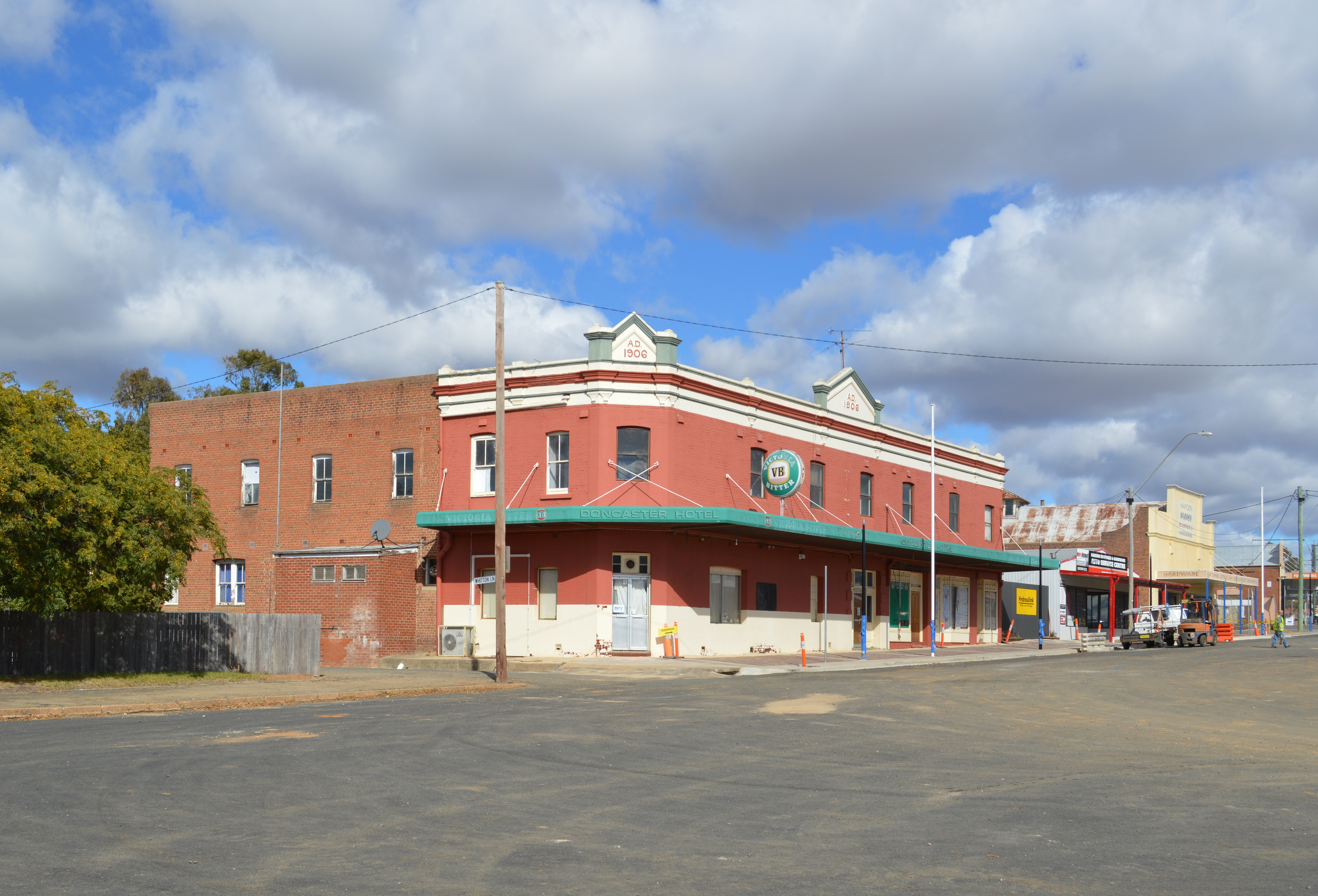
Harden Doncaster Hotel

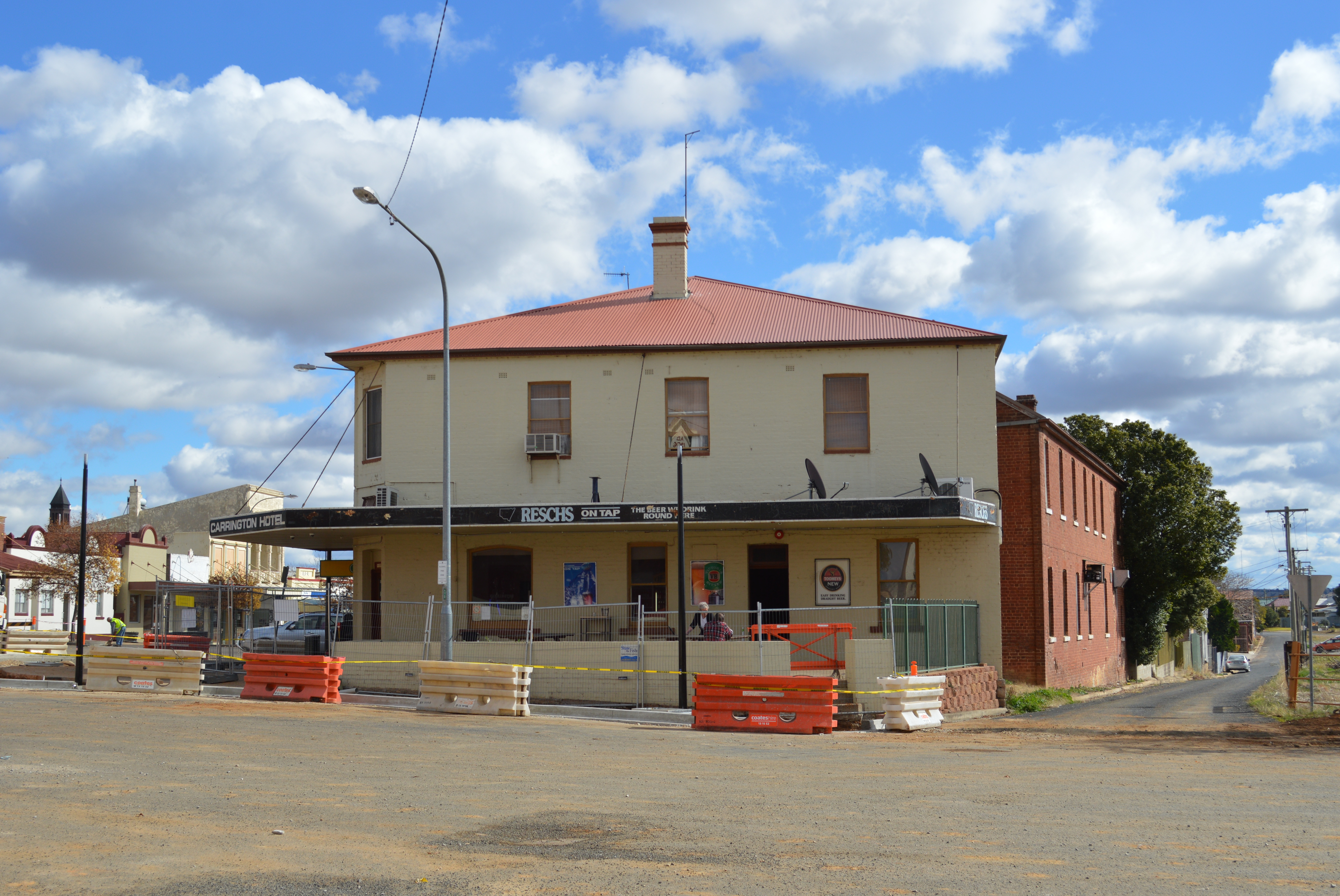
Harden Carrington Hotel

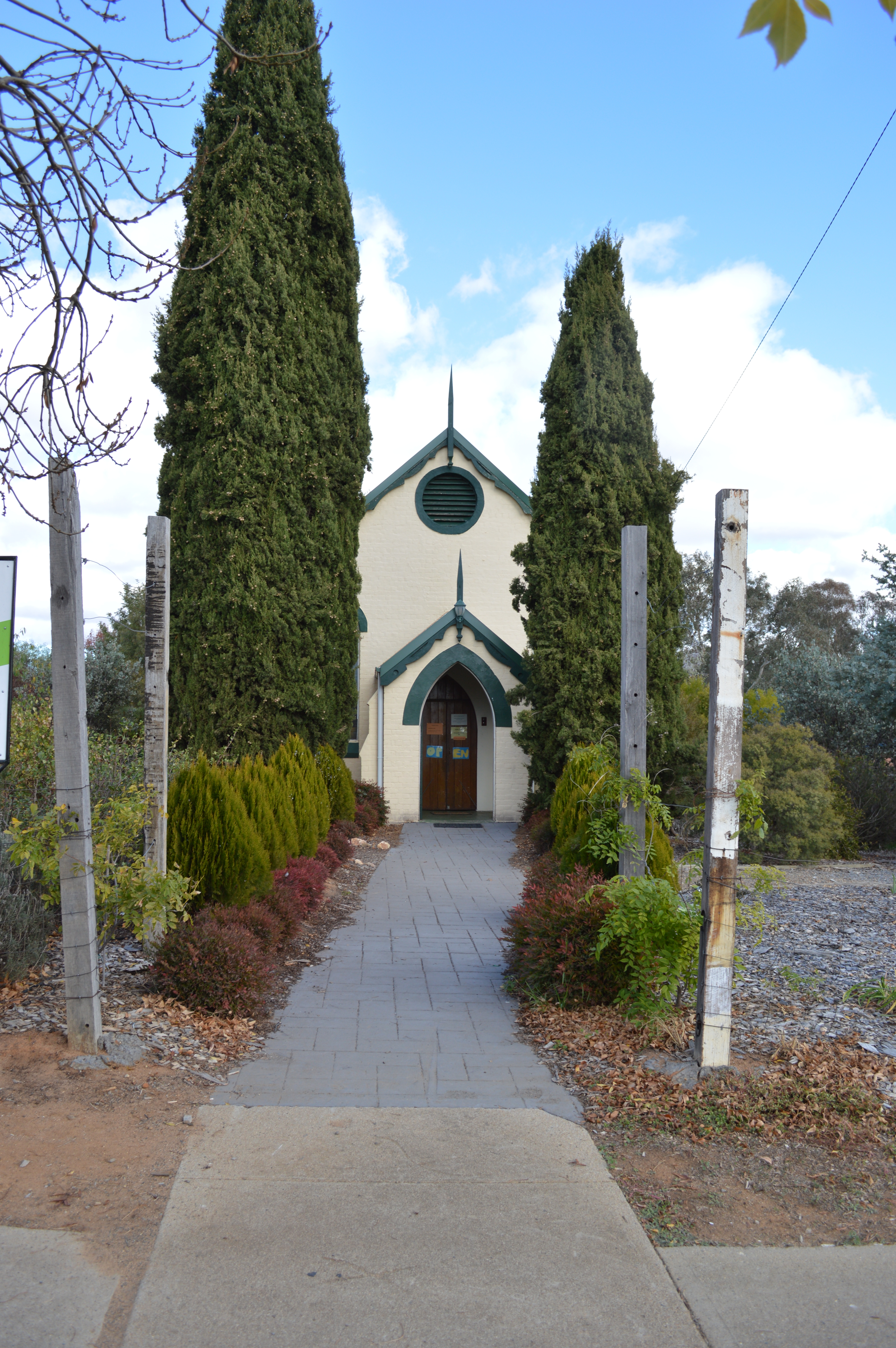
Former Harden Methodist Church

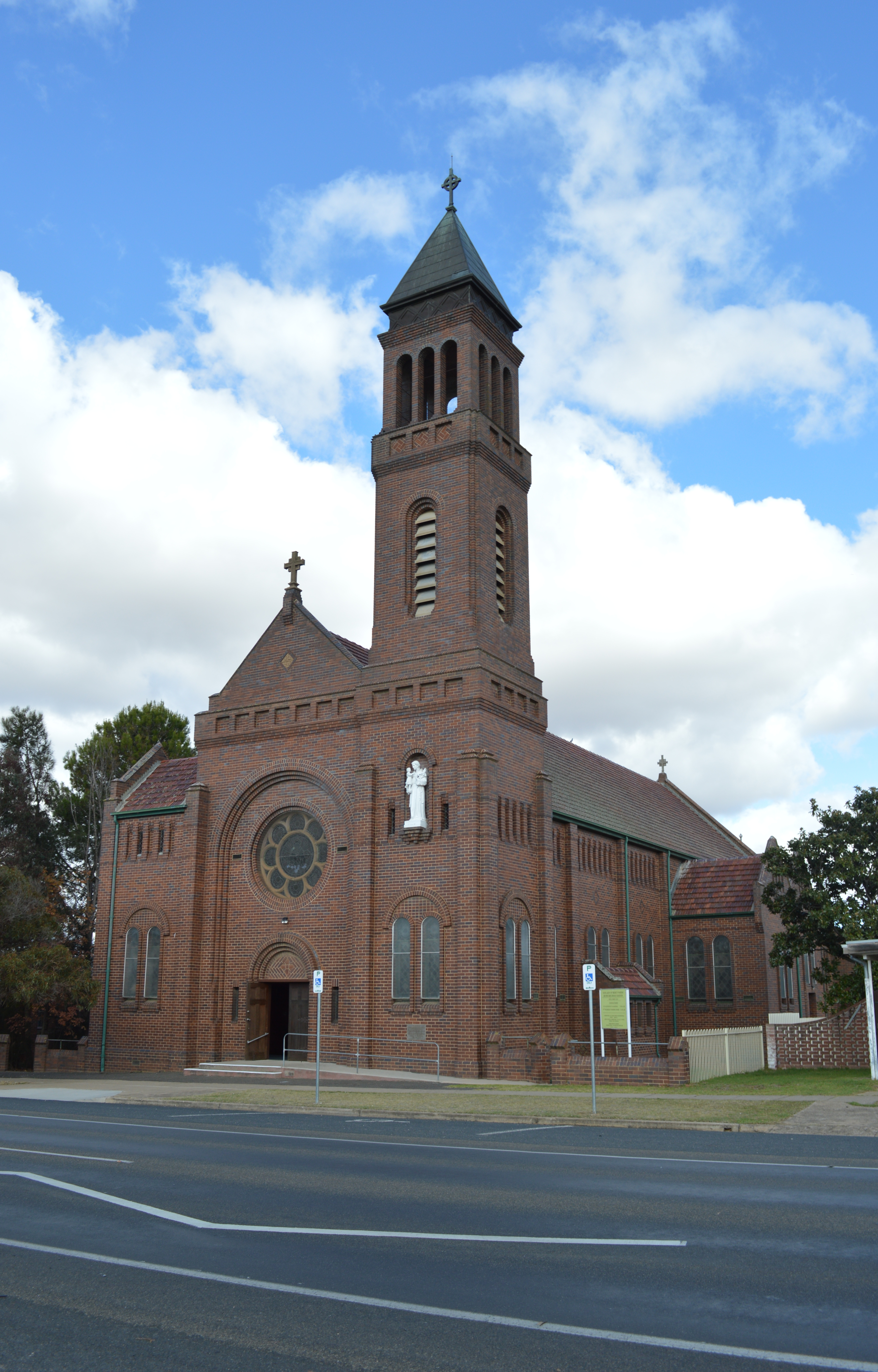
Harden Catholic Church

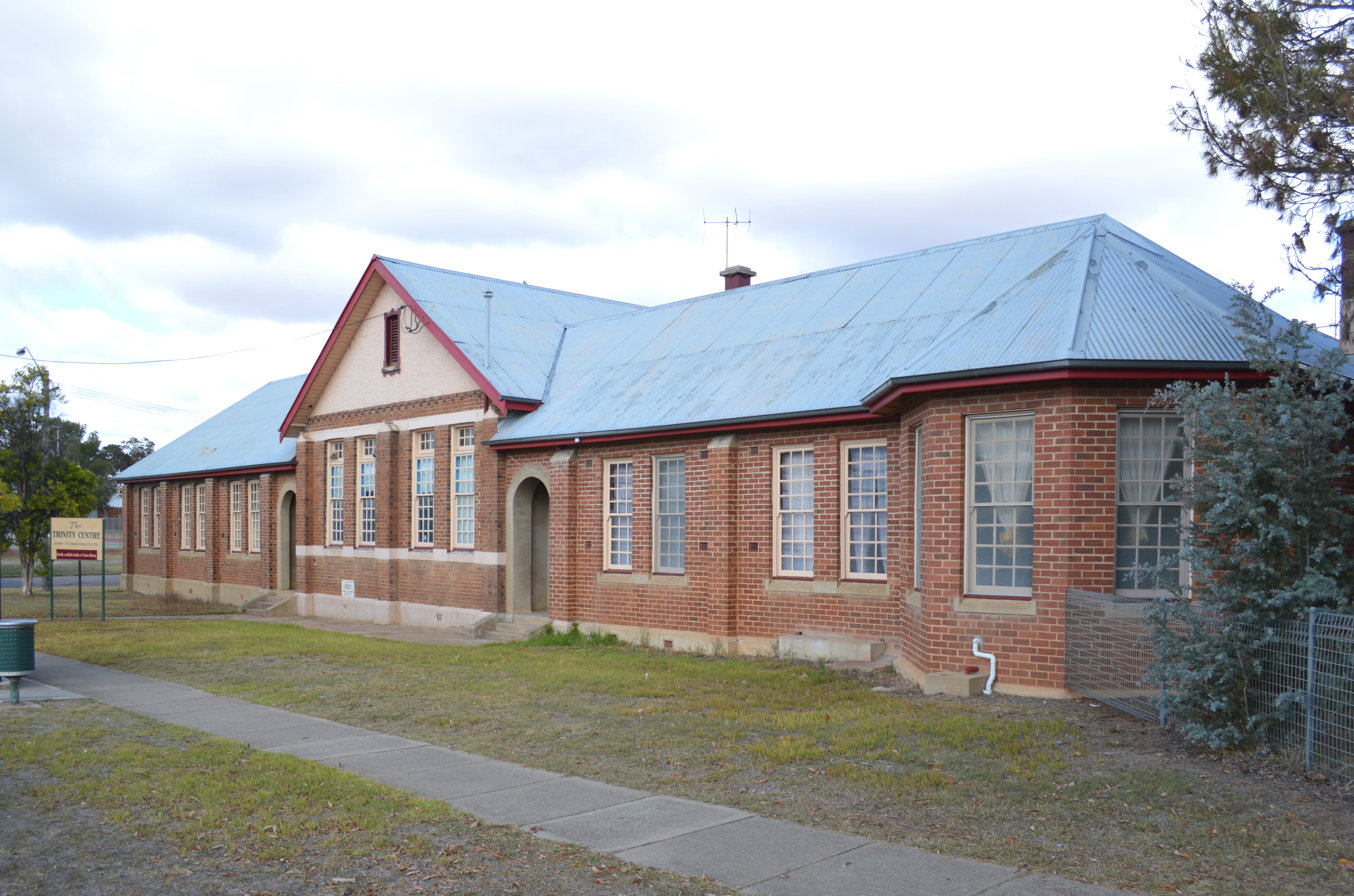
Harden Trinity Centre

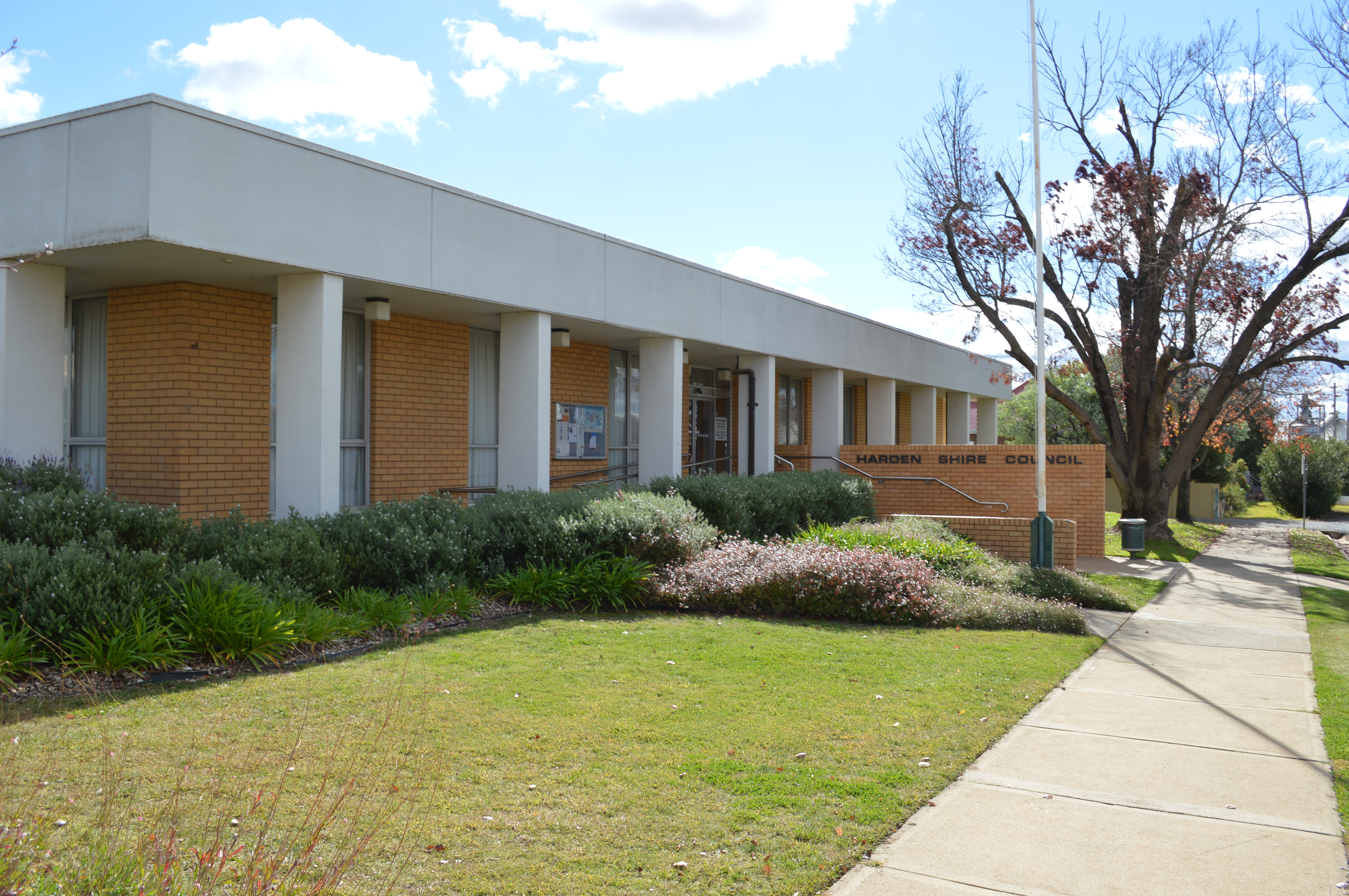
Hilltops Council Office

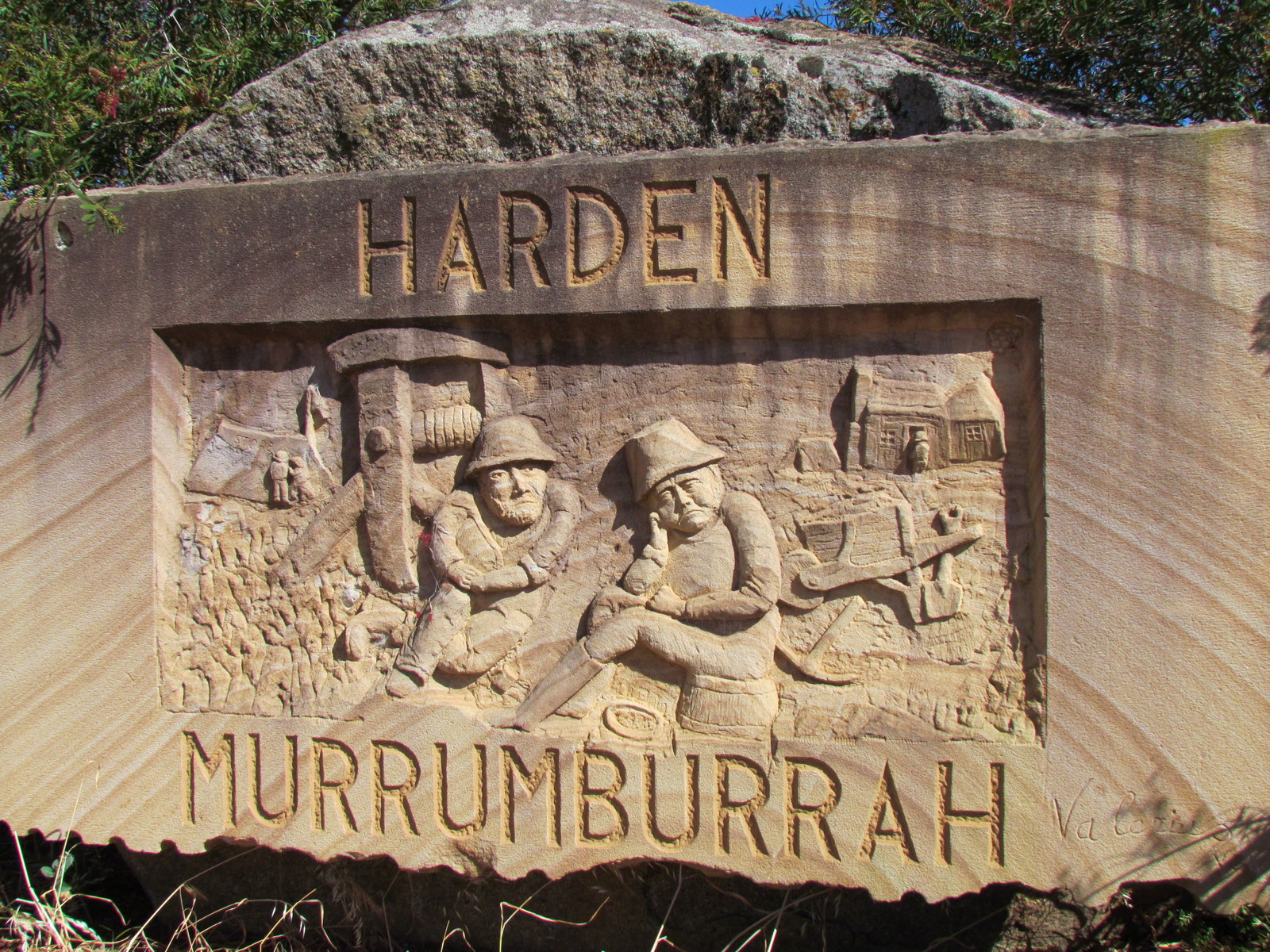
Town sign, by local artist Carl Valerius

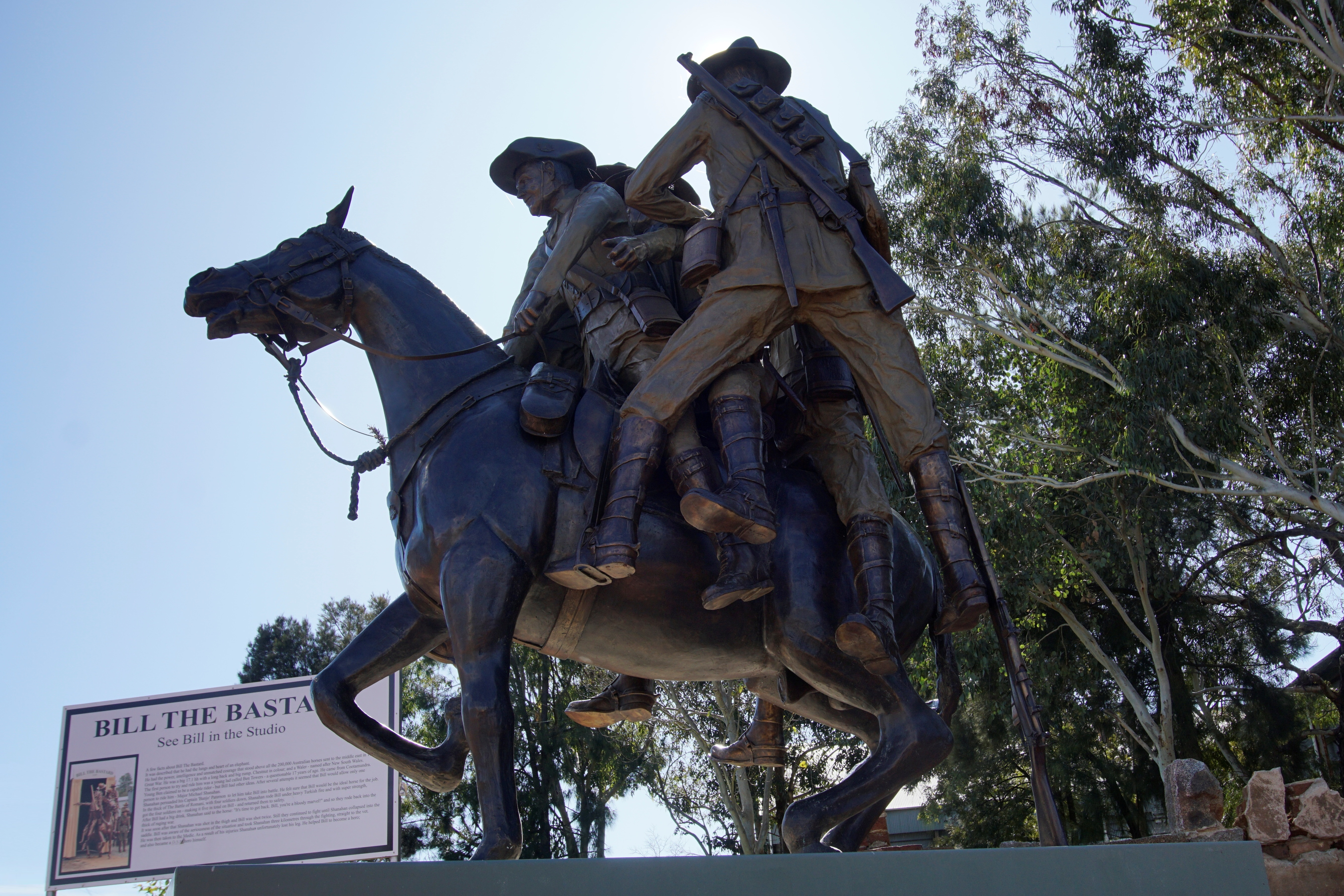
"Bill the Bastard" also by Valerius

== Sport and events ==
The annual Harden Picnic Races are a country race meeting held at Harden Racecourse, generally on Cox Plate day in late October. By 2025 the meeting had reached its 42nd annual running, with local reporting noting that it attracted racegoers from Sydney, Canberra, the Riverina and surrounding regions. The race card includes the Harden Picnic Cup, which in 2025 was run over 1400 metres.

Harden Kite Festival held about the second Saturday in October is an event held at the Racecourse.

Australian 2-man Ambrose is played in late September at the Harden Country Club over 2 days. This has been running for over 30 years. The course has been improving over years.

The Showground hosts many events throughout the year such as showjumping; tractor displays; dog breed and various bird shows. Camping and caravans spaces onsite.

Preceding station	NSW TrainLink	Following station
Cootamundra towards Griffith or Melbourne	NSW TrainLink Southern Line Griffith Xplorer; Melbourne XPT	Yass Junction towards Sydney
