= Murrumburrah =

- Town
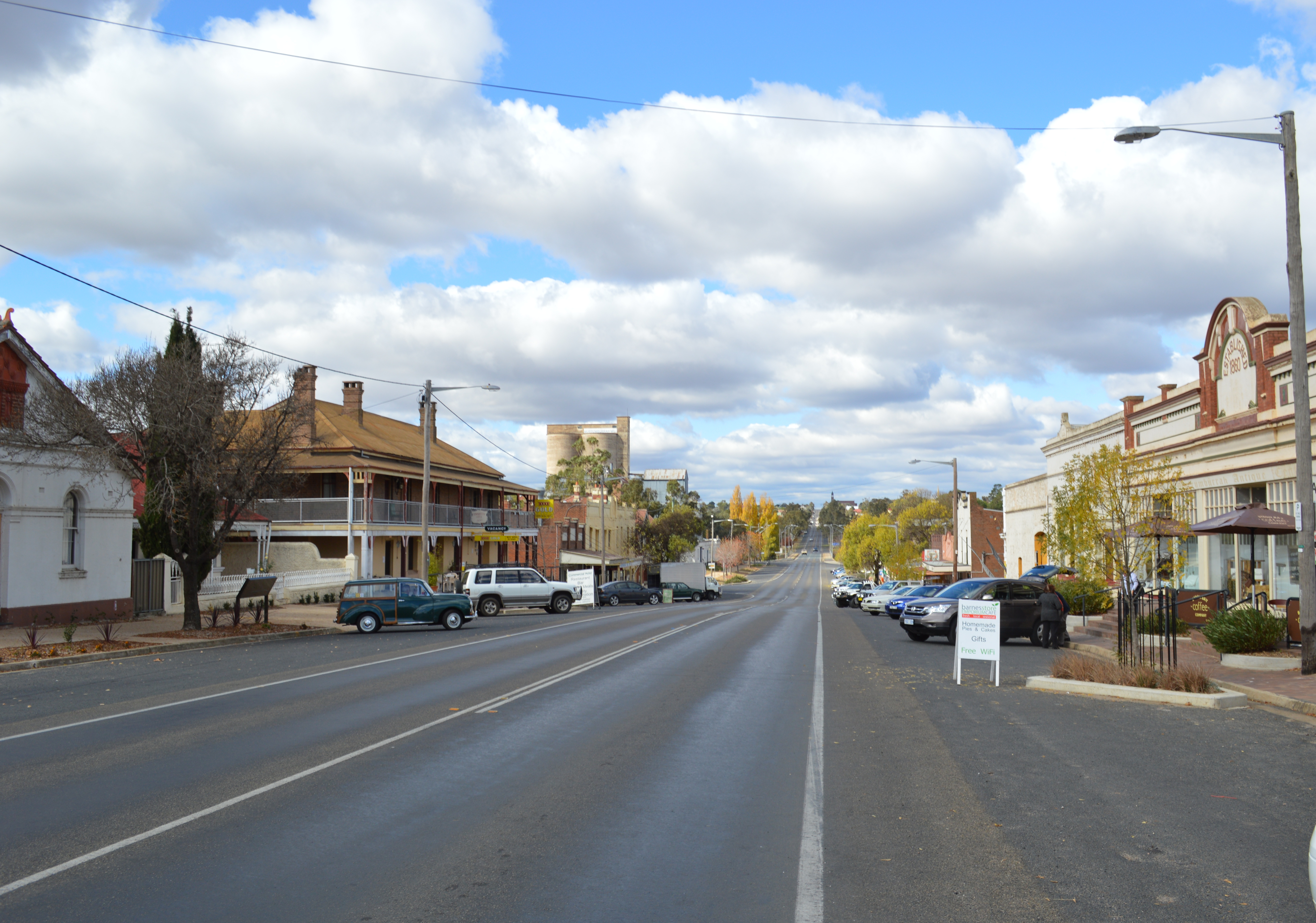
- Albury Street, the main street of Murrumburrah

- Coordinates: 34°33′S 148°21′E
- Country: Australia
- State: New South Wales
- LGA: Hilltops Council

Government
  - State electorate: Cootamundra
  - Federal division: Riverina

Population
  - Total: 81 (SAL 2021)
- Postcode: 2587

Murrumburrah is a town in New South Wales, Australia, part of a twin town with Harden. The town is in Hilltops Council local government area in the South West Slopes area of NSW. It is on the Burley Griffin Way, the major link from the Riverina to the Hume Highway near Yass, and ultimately Sydney, Canberra and the coast.

The name probably comes from Wiradhuri murrimboola, which can reasonably be translated to "two waterholes".

== History ==
Before European settlement the Harden area was inhabited by the Wiradjuri people. Hume and Hovell passed nearby in 1824. In the late 1820s, the 'Murrumburra' was established. Its superintendent, James Kennedy, established an inn on the townsite in the late 1840s. Gold was found in the area in the 1850s. In 1858, it was gazetted as the name Murrimboola, which was a Wiradjuri word meaning two water holes. In mid-1872, a traveller made the following comments about Murrumburrah, "a small township on the road to Lambing Flat":

Murrumburrah has two churches, a school, three hotels, the same number of stores, and a good steam flour mill. The Roman Catholic Church is a fine stone building on a hill above the town, and looks very picturesque; the Wesleyan Chapel is a small wooden building. The principal hotels are Mr. Murphy’s and Mr. Dillon’s. The former owns the flour mill, a good brick building, three stories high. It may be mentioned that a good deal of wheat is grown in the district.

A railway station was opened one km east of Murrumburrah on the Main Southern line in 1877 as Murrumburrah station, but changed its name to Harden station, the year after the opening of a new station in Murrumburrah in 1879. Harden has remained as the main station and, as a result, became the main town.

== Population ==
Historical population
Year	Pop.	±%
1921	2,958	—
1933	2,851	−3.6%
1947	2,595	−9.0%
1954	2,727	+5.1%
1961	2,634	−3.4%
1966	2,435	−7.6%
1971	2,263	−7.1%
1976	2,112	−6.7%
1981	2,070	−2.0%
1986	2,045	−1.2%
1991	2,016	−1.4%
1996	1,700	−15.7%
2001	1,913	+12.5%
2006	1,996	+4.3%
2011	1,925	−3.6%
2016	1,964	+2.0%
2021	1,789	−8.9%
Source: Australian Bureau of Statistics data. Note: covers the Murrumburrah-Harden urban area.

At the 2021 census, Murrumburrah had a population of 81, a decrease from 110 people at the 2016 census, while at the 2011 census, there were 479 people.

== Heritage listings ==
Murrumburrah has a number of heritage-listed sites, including:

- Main Southern railway: Demondrille railway station

== Light Horse memorial ==
A feature of the town is a memorial to the Australian Light Horse regiment, which had its origin in Harden-Murrumburrah by the establishment on 28 August 1897 of the 1st Australian (Volunteer) Horse by 34 men from the district. The two large bronze statues depicting Trooper Bradford, one of the original volunteers, and J. A. Kenneth Mackay, prominent in the development of the 1st Australian Horse, were the work of Carl Valerius. (Note: Valerius, who has a studio in the town, was responsible for the bronze of Don Bradman in action, located in a park at Cootamundra and a dozen of the busts on the Cricket Captains' Walk. His best-known creation may be the large bronze depicting "Bill the Bastard".)

== Gallery ==
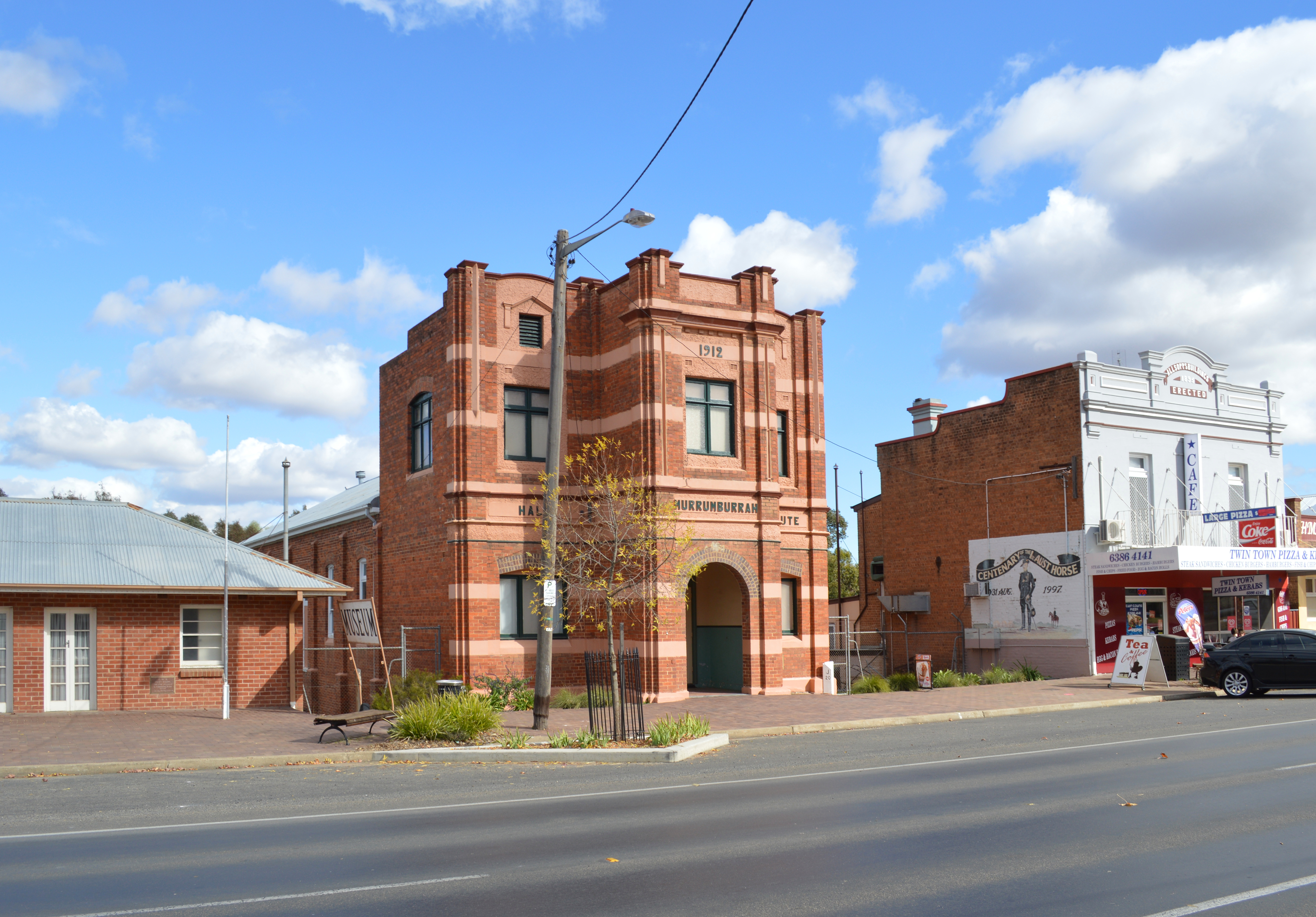
Murrumburrah Institute & Hall

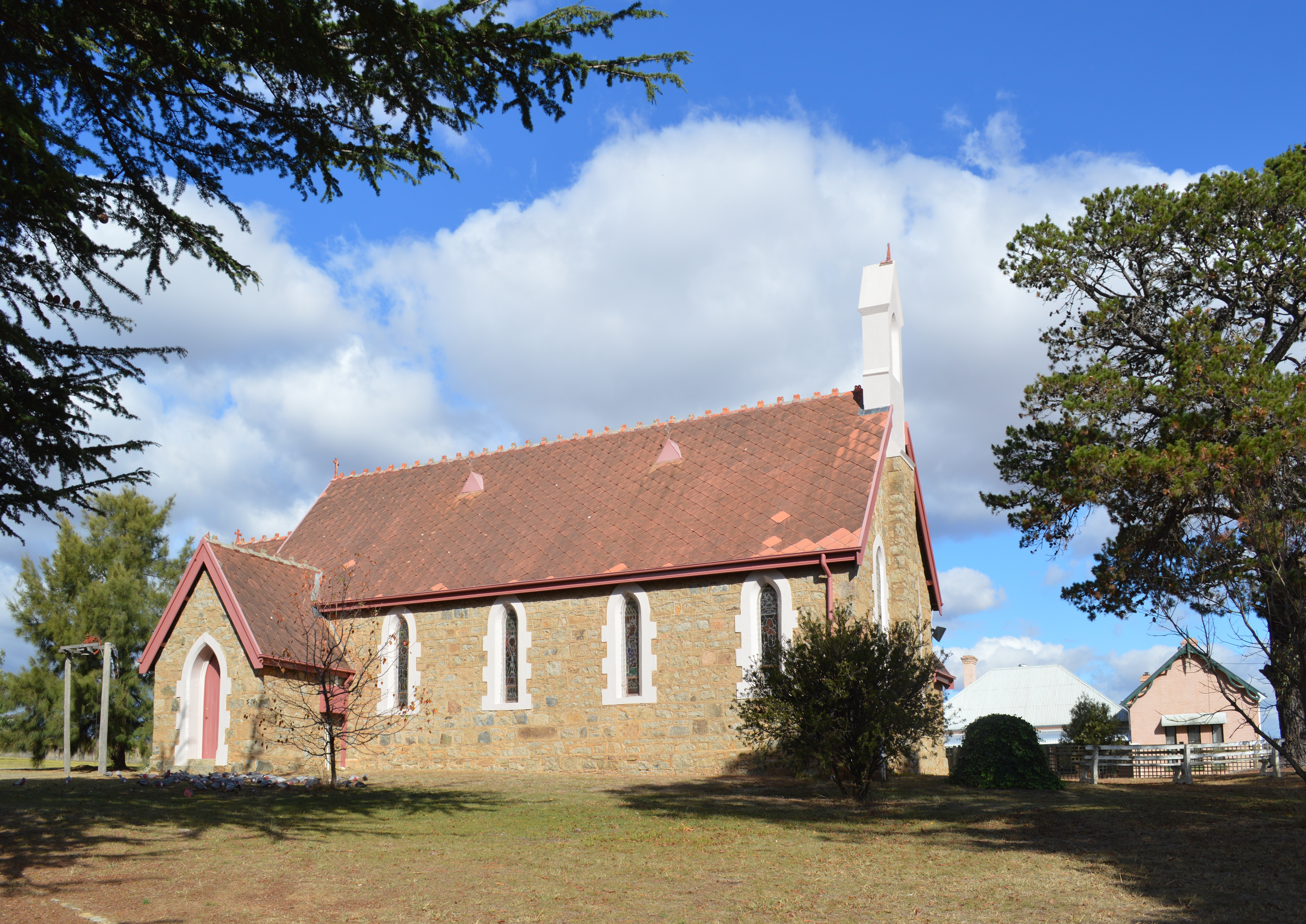
Anglican Church

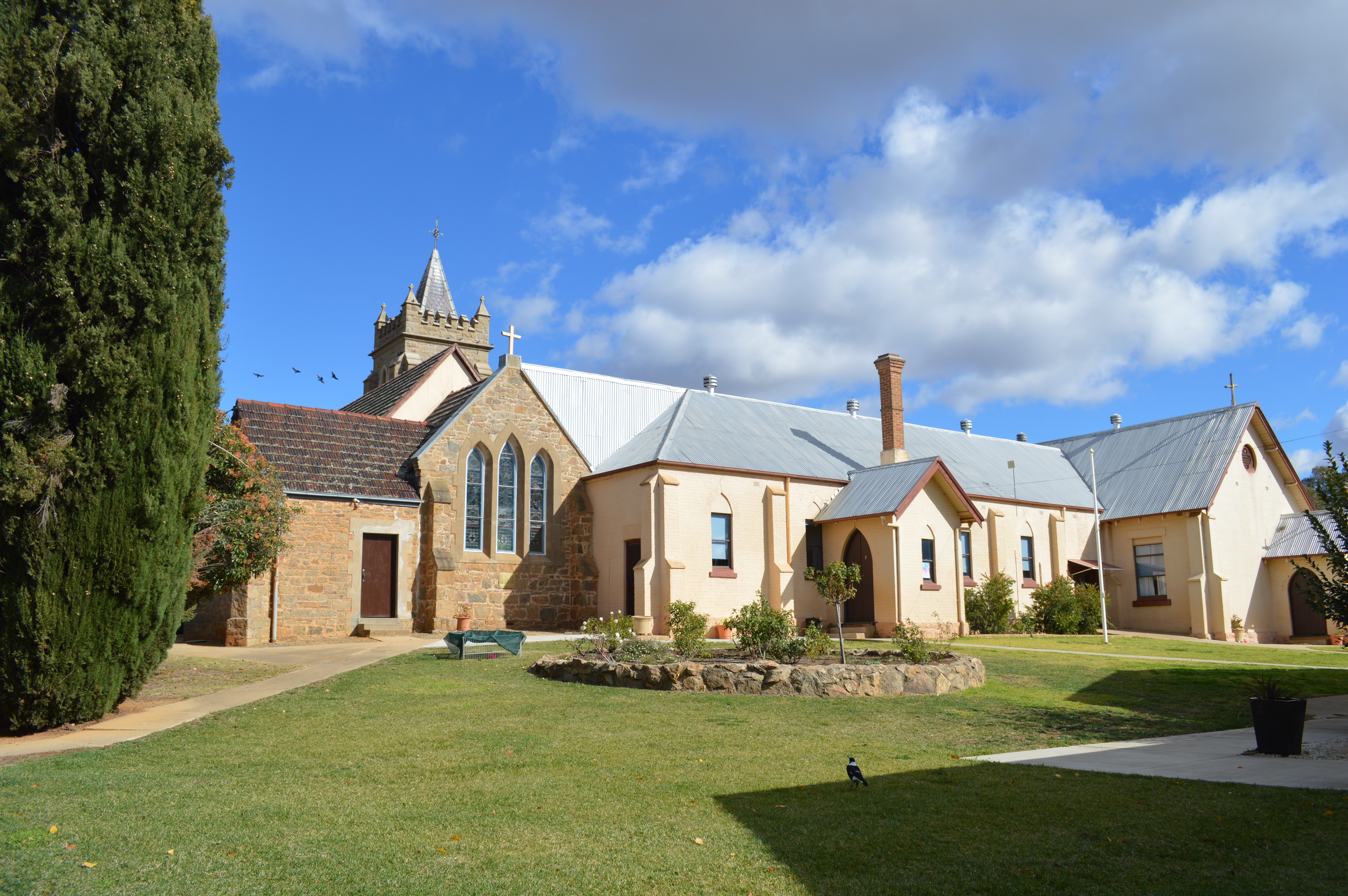
Catholic Church

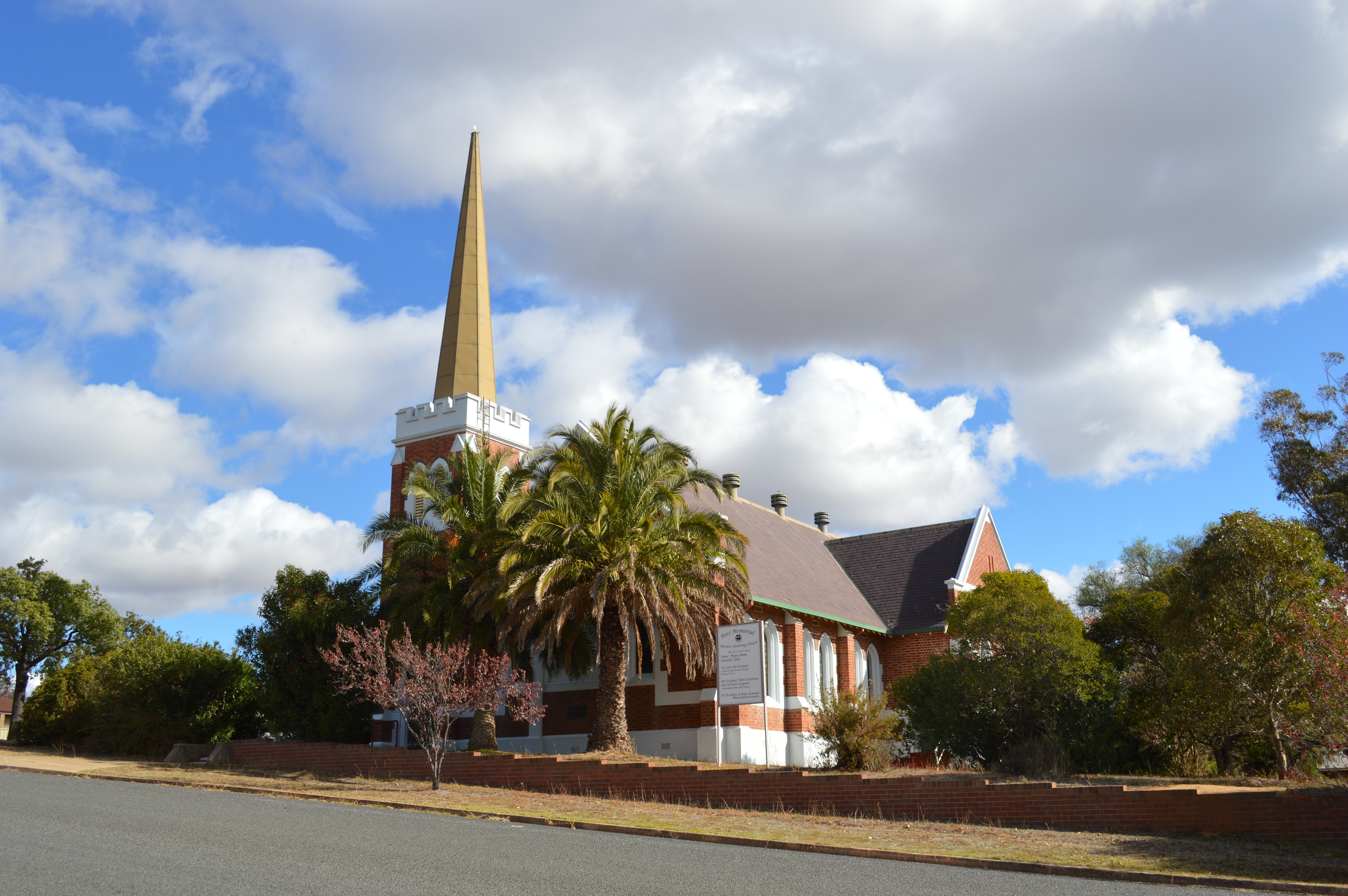
Uniting Church

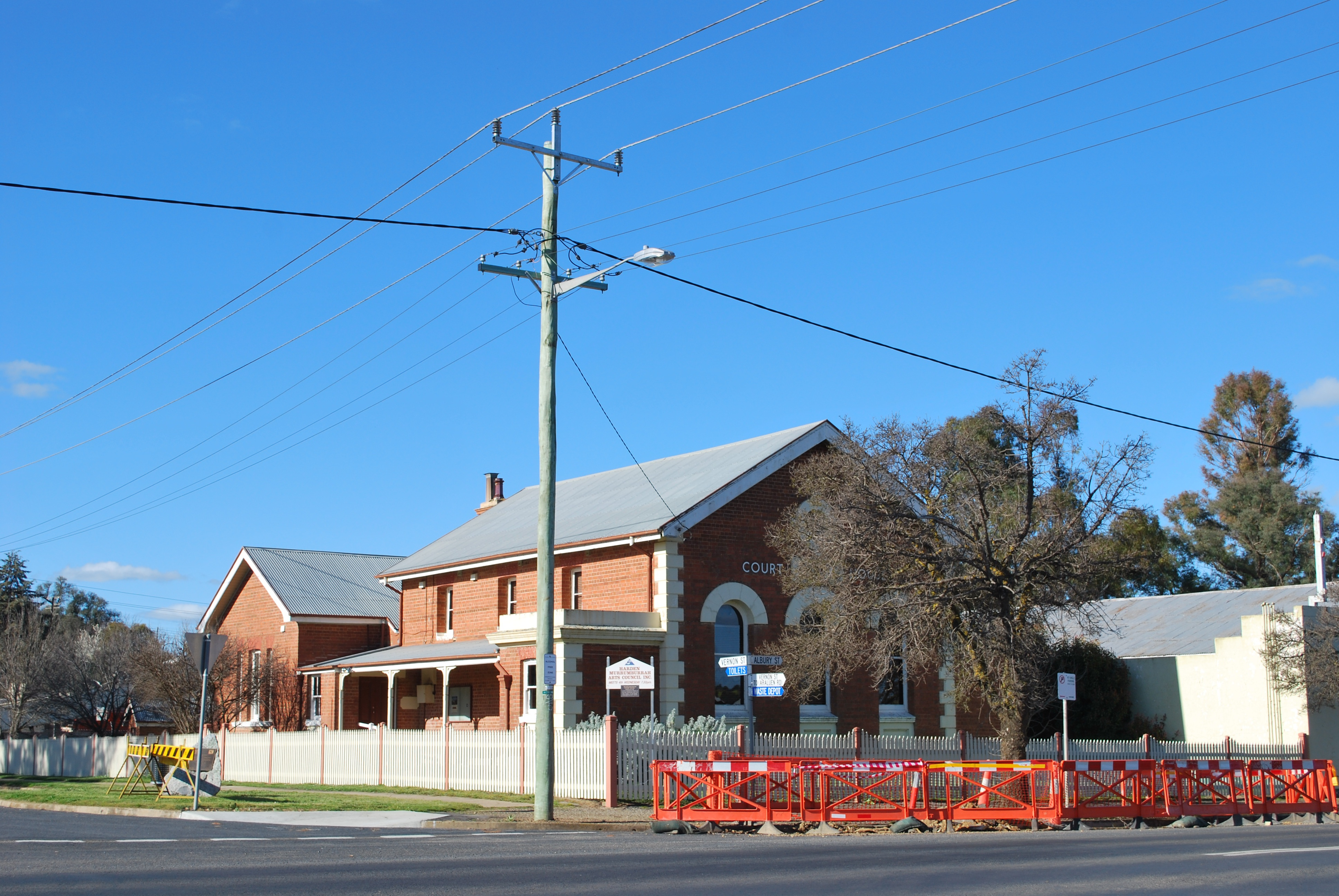
Court House

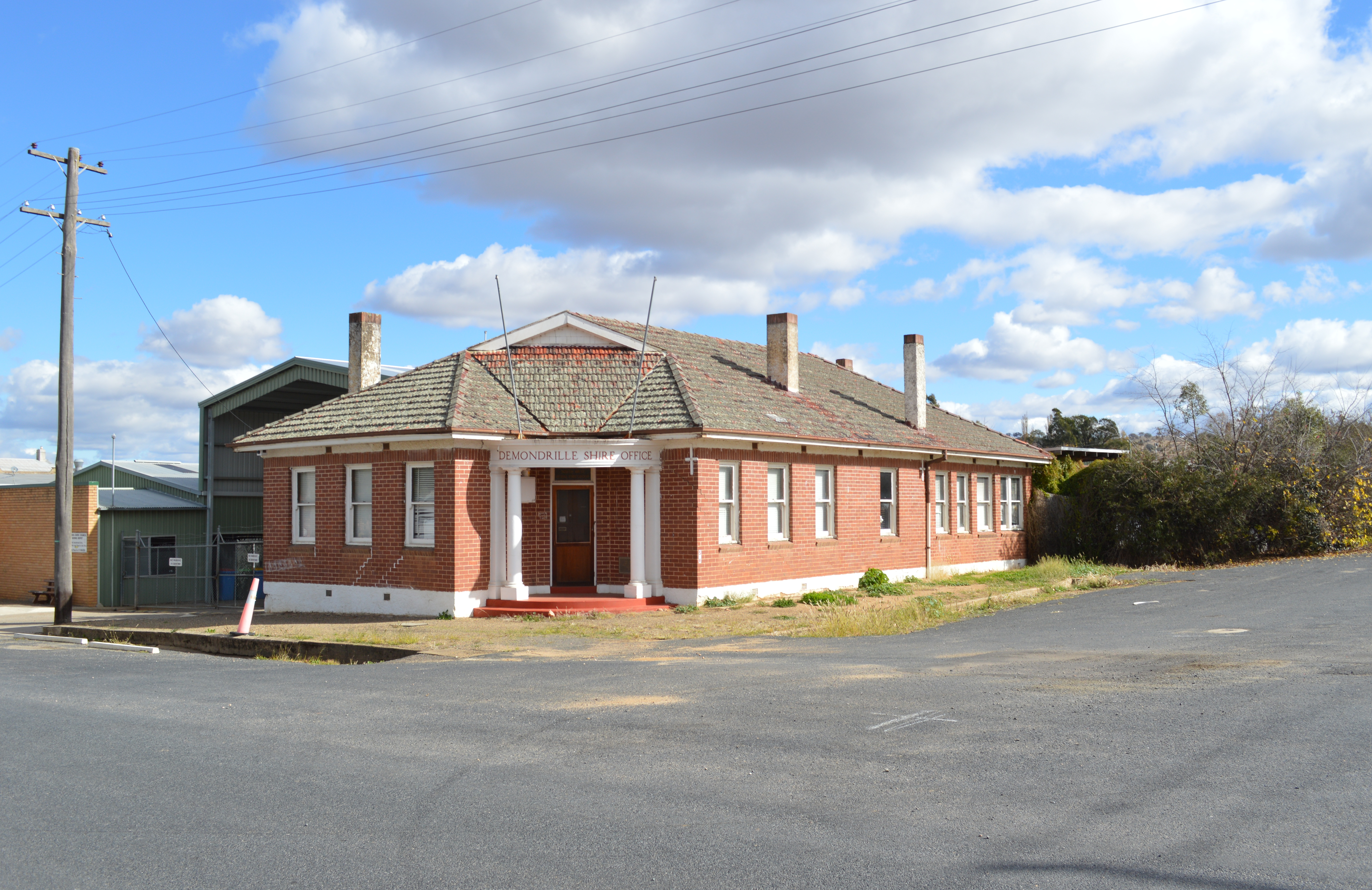
Shire Offices

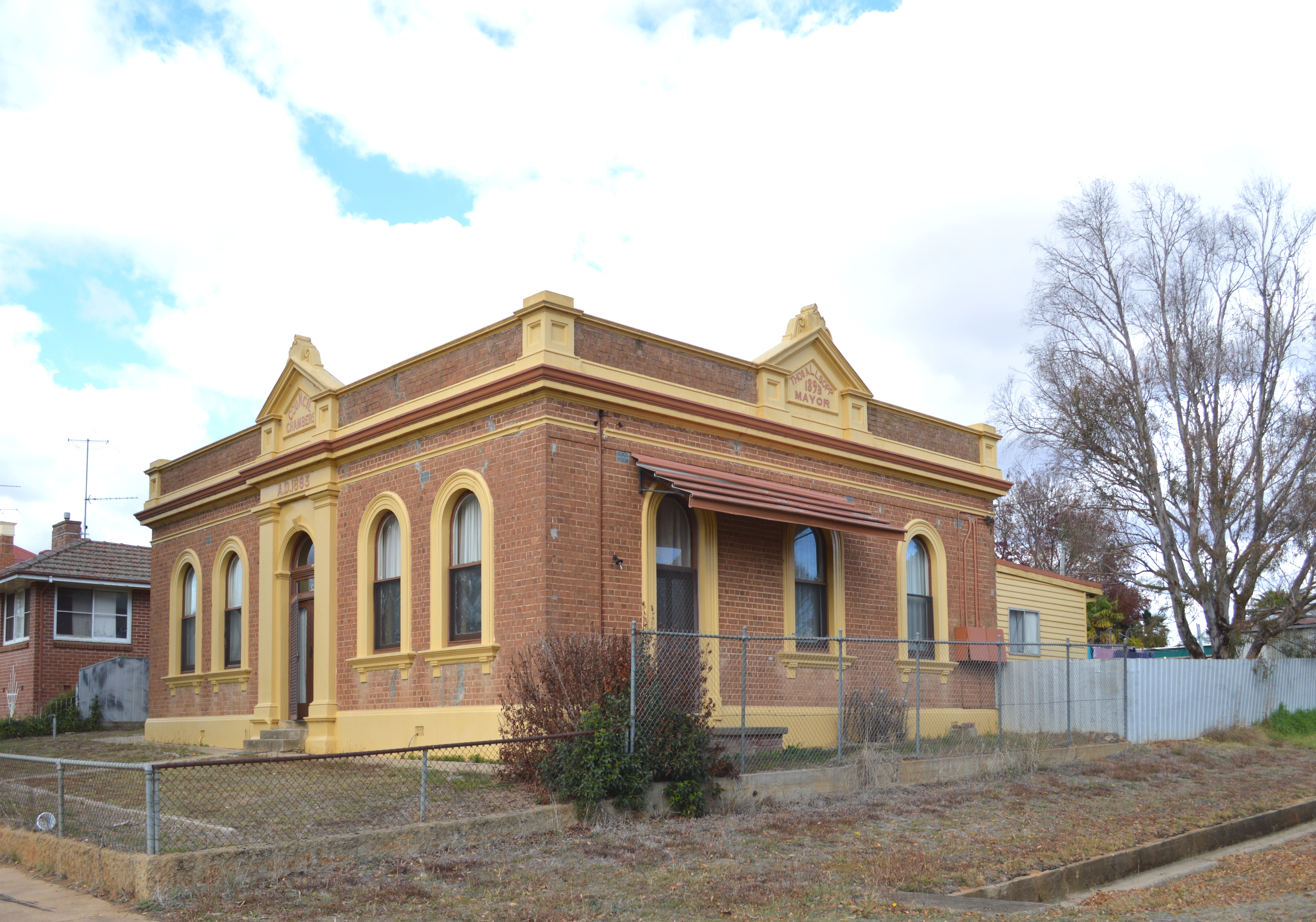
Council Chambers

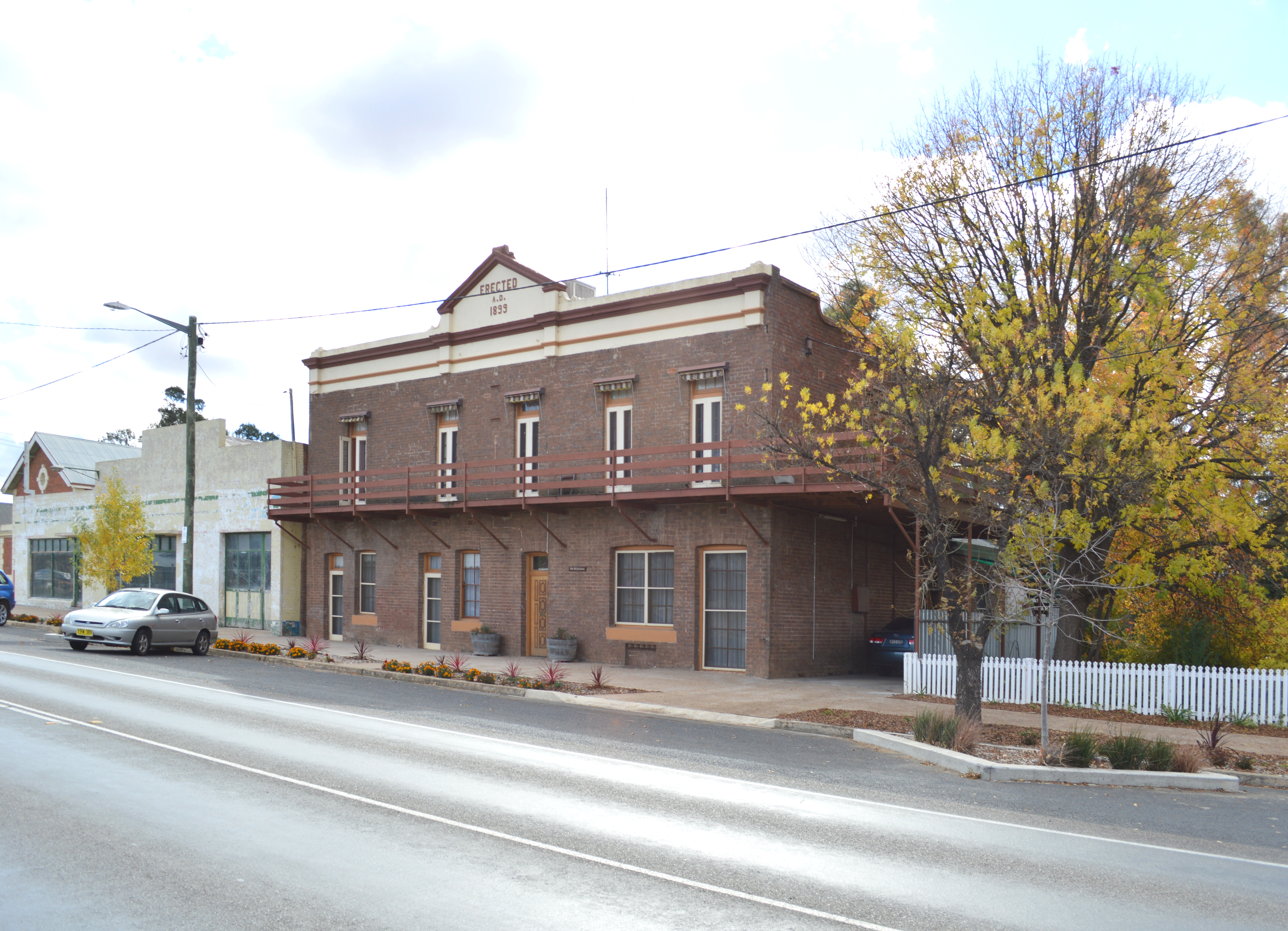
Exchange Hotel

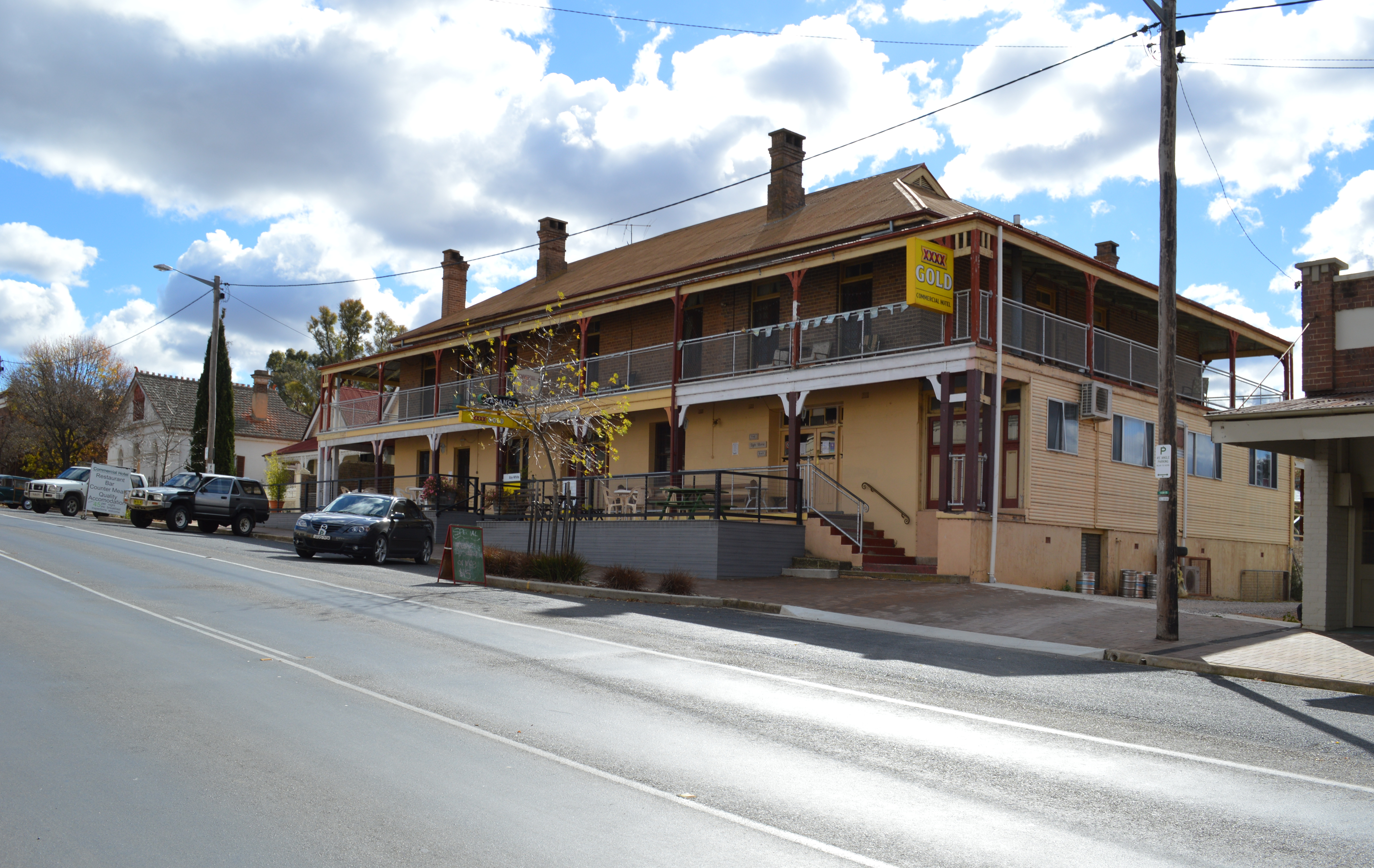
Commercial Hotel

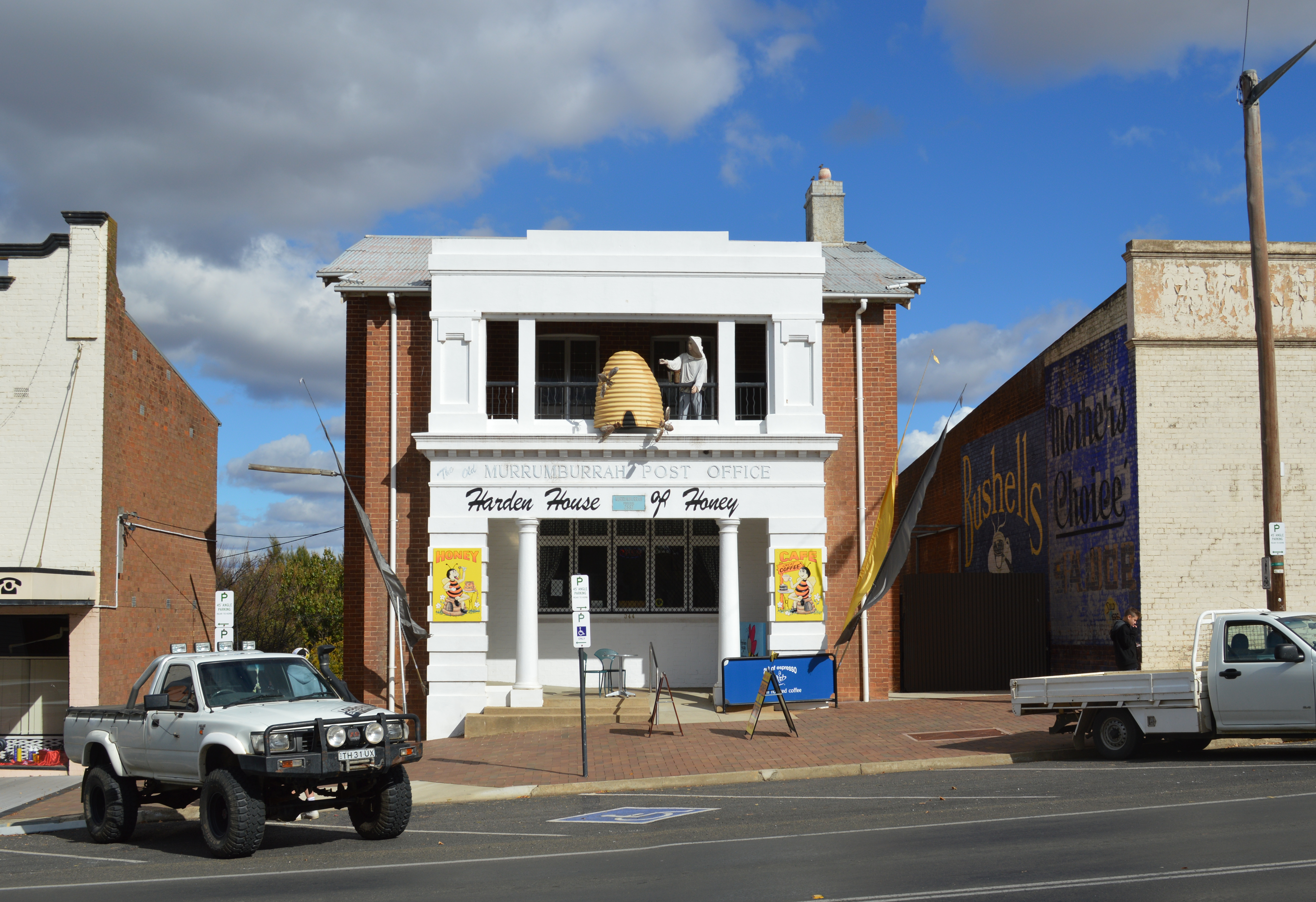
Post Office

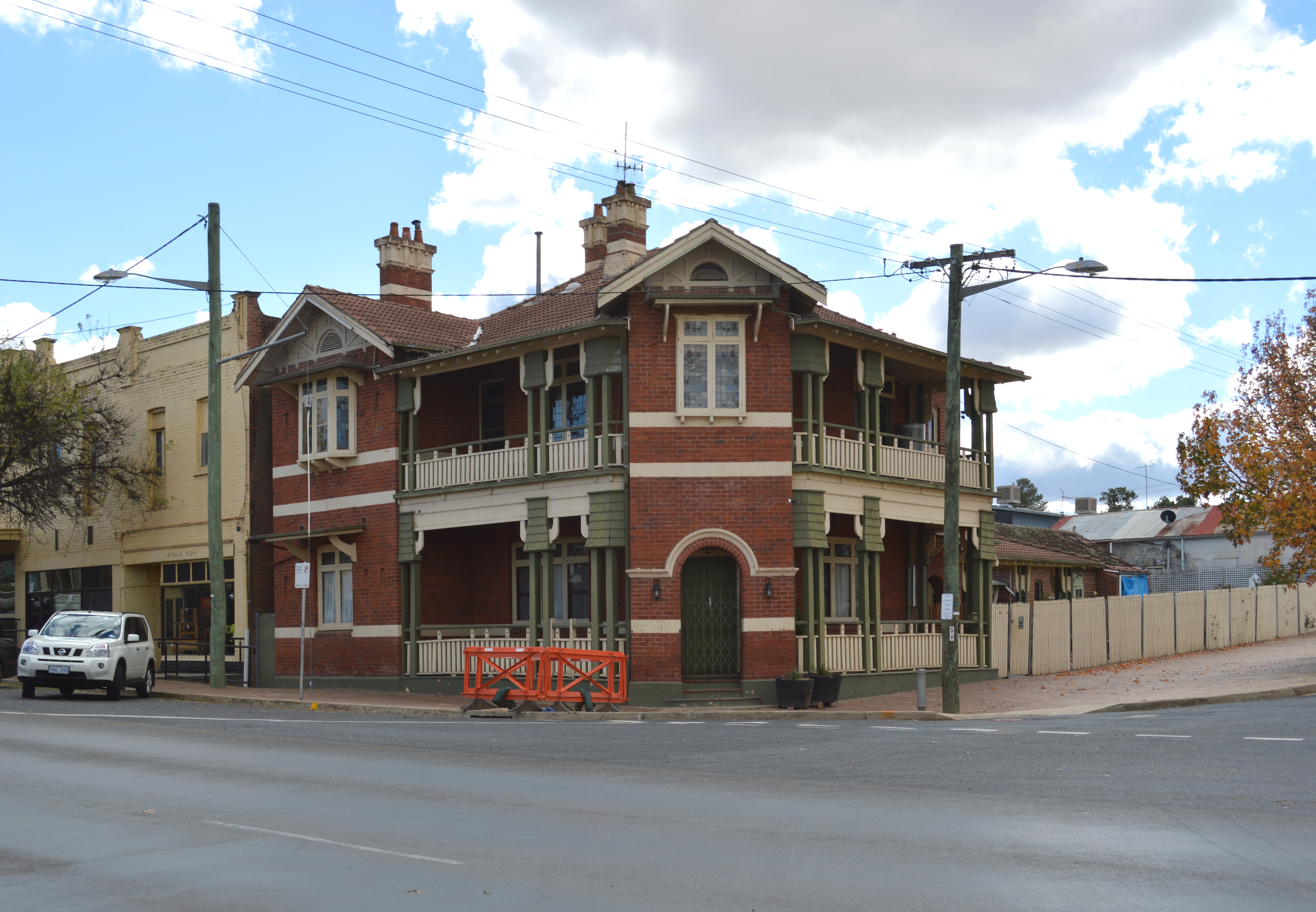
CBC Bank

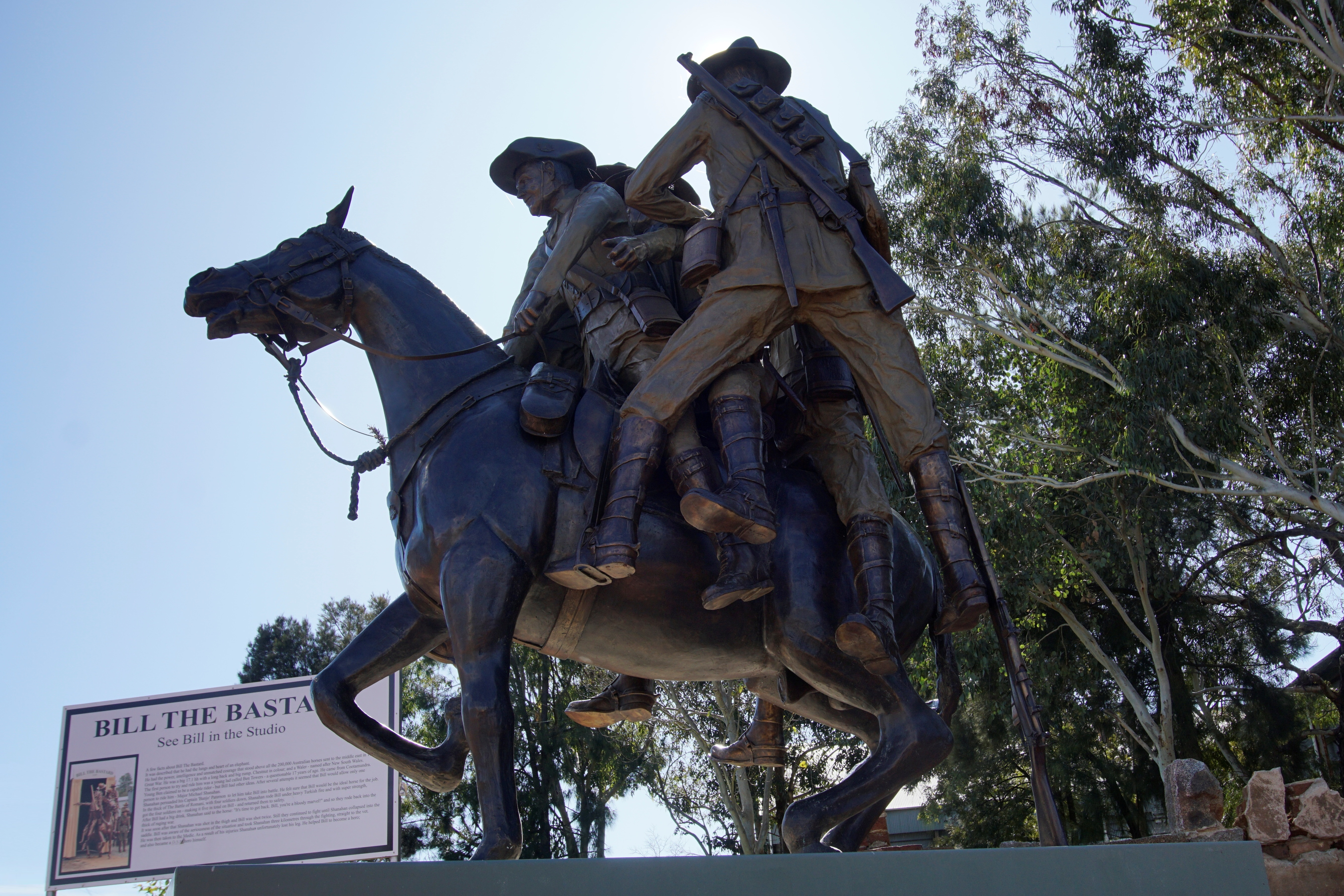
Bill the Bastard

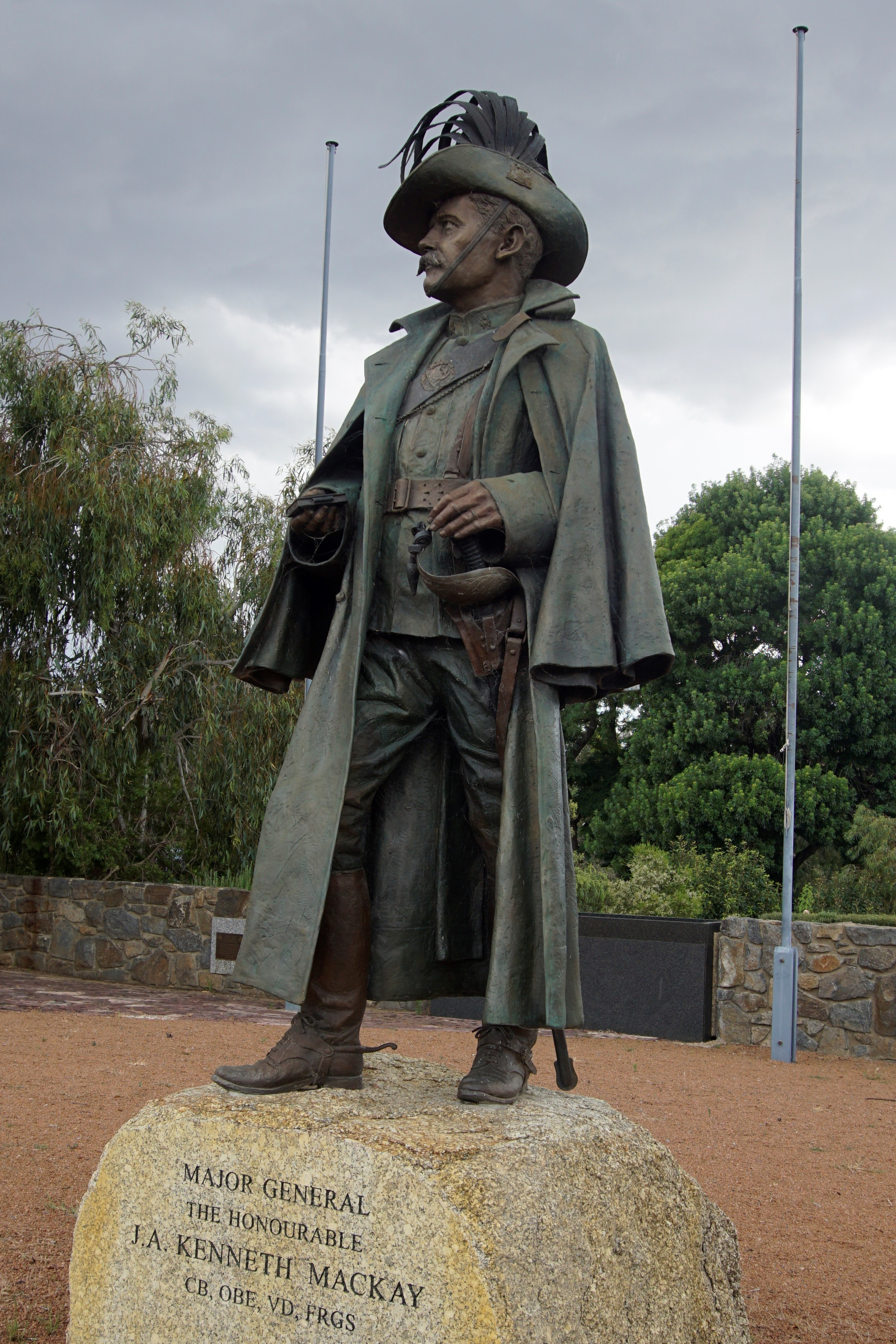
Kenneth Mackay

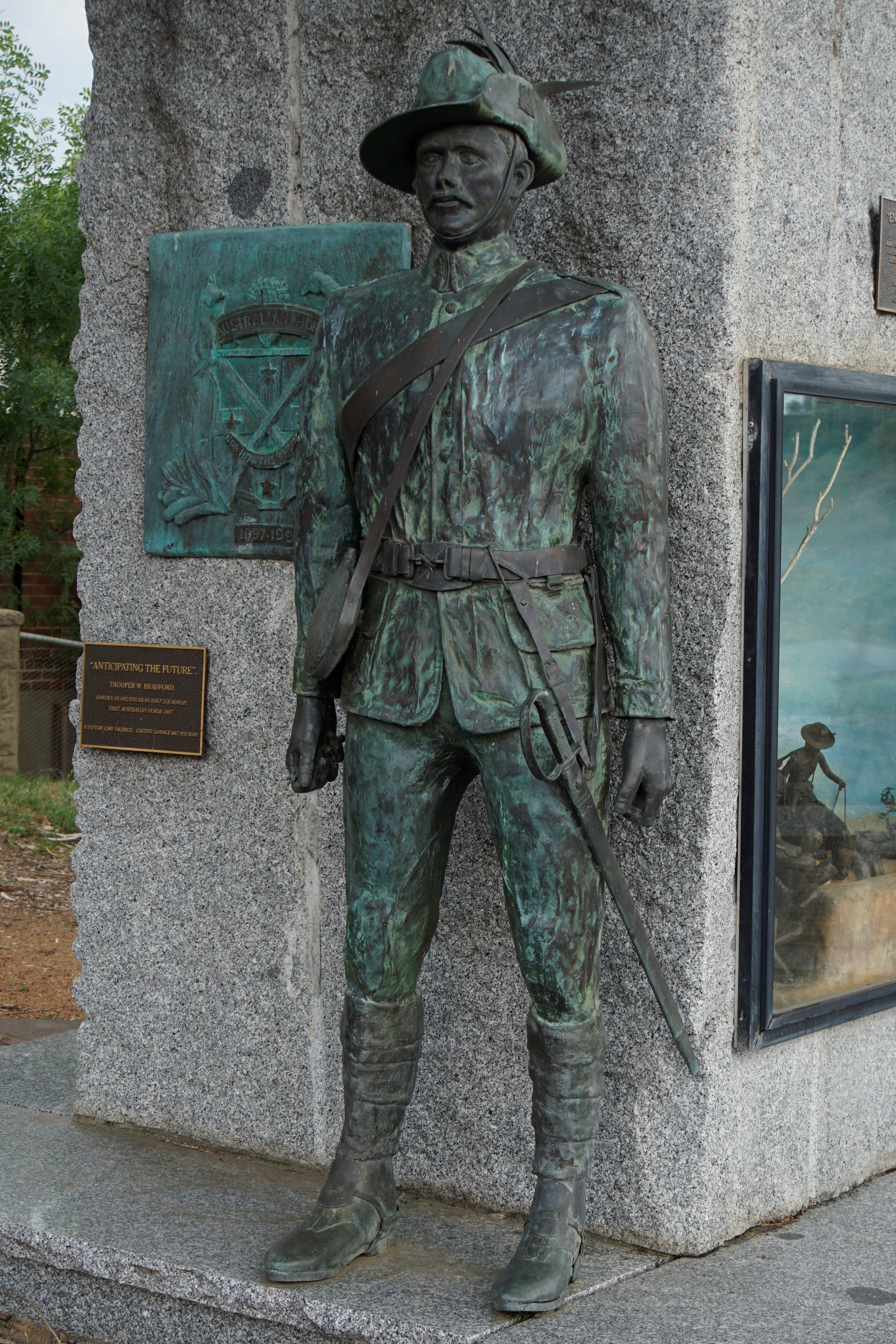
Trooper Bradford
