= Murrumburrah railway station =

Former railway station in New South Wales, Australia

Murrumburrah
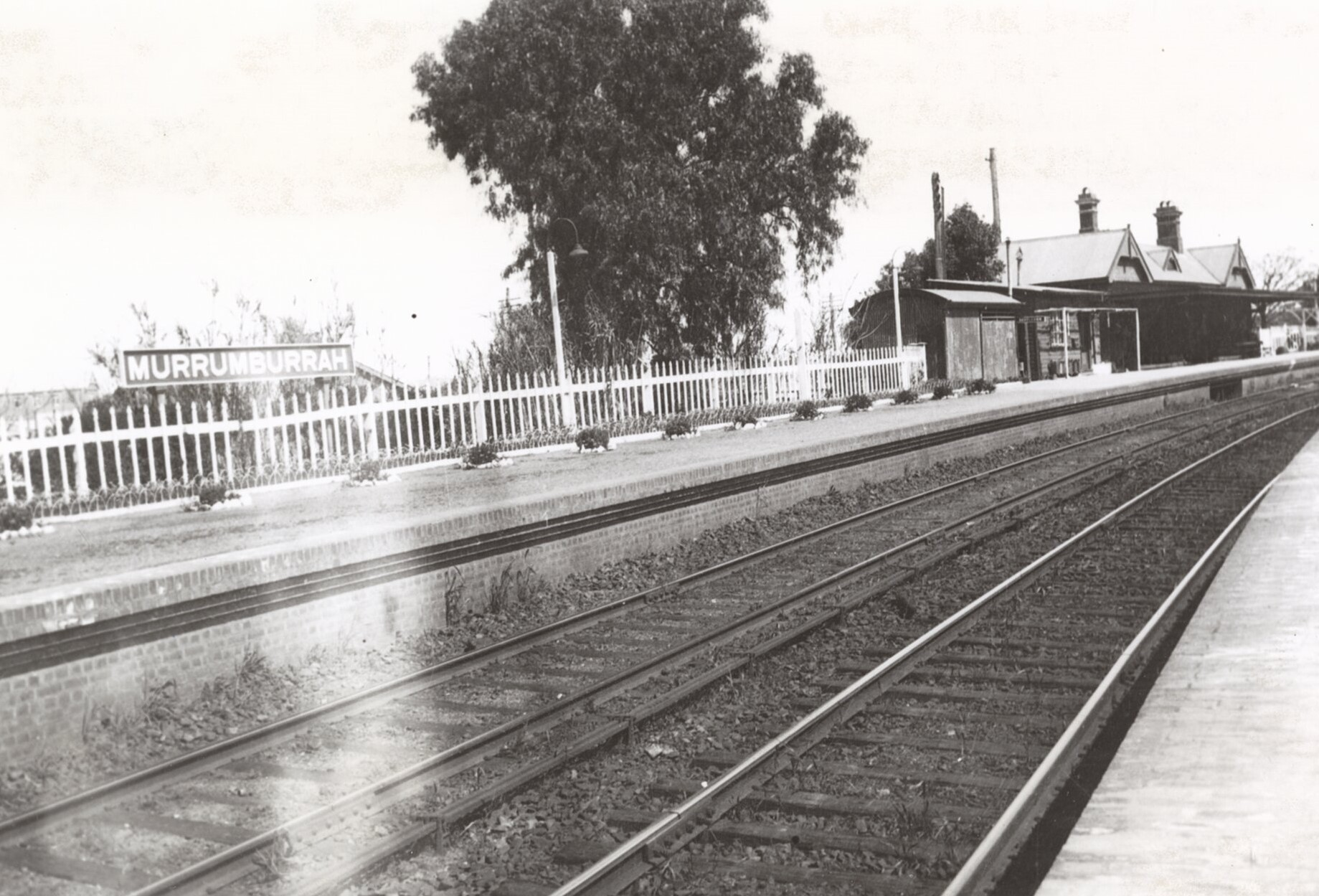
- The station viewed from Platform 2 in c.1930

General information
- Location: Bathurst Street and Wernon Street, Murrumburrah, New South Wales; Australia
- Coordinates: 34°32′49″S 148°21′03″E
- Line: Main Southern
- Distance: 388.700 km from Central
- Platforms: 2 (2 side)
- Tracks: 2

Construction
- Structure type: Ground

History
- Opened: 15 September 1879
- Closed: 8 February 1976

Services
Preceding station	Former services	Following station
Demondrille towards Albury	Main Southern Line	Harden towards Sydney
Demondrille towards Blayney	Blayney–Demondrille Line	Harden Terminus
Location

Murrumburrah railway station was a railway station on the Main South railway line in New South Wales, Australia. The station opened in 1879 and closed to passenger services in 1976. It was subsequently demolished and little trace remains.
