= Harden railway station =

Railway station in New South Wales, Australia

Harden
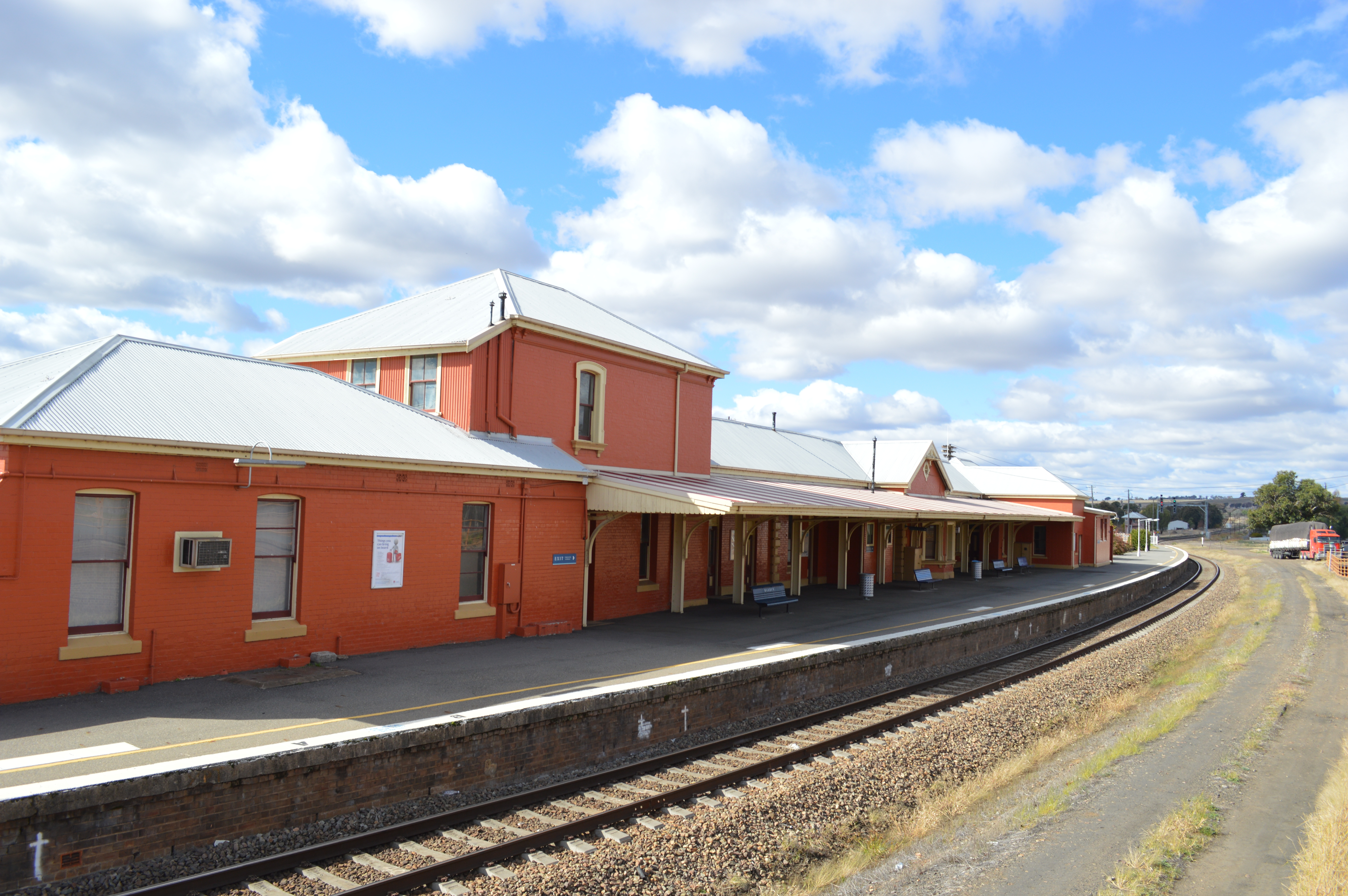
- Eastbound view in May 2013

General information
- Location: Station Street, Harden; Australia
- Coordinates: 34°33′13″S 148°22′18″E
- Owner: Transport Asset Manager of New South Wales
- Operator: NSW TrainLink
- Line: Main Southern
- Distance: 385.40 kilometres (239.48 mi) from Central
- Platforms: 2 (1 island)
- Tracks: 2

Construction
- Structure type: Ground
- Accessible: Assisted access

Other information
- Station code: HRD

History
- Opened: 12 March 1877; 149 years ago
- Former names: Murrumburrah (1877–1878); North Murrumburrah (1878–1880)

Services
Preceding station	NSW TrainLink	Following station
Cootamundra towards Griffith	NSW TrainLink Southern Line Griffith Xplorer	Yass Junction towards Sydney
Cootamundra towards Melbourne	NSW TrainLink Southern Line Melbourne XPT	Yass Junction towards Sydney
Former services
Preceding station	Former services	Following station
Murrumburrah towards Albury	Main Southern Line	Cunningar towards Sydney
Murrumburrah towards Blayney	Blayney–Demondrille Line	Terminus
Location

Harden railway station is a heritage-listed railway station located on the Main Southern line in New South Wales, Australia. It serves the town of Harden. It was added to the New South Wales State Heritage Register on 2 April 1999.

== History ==
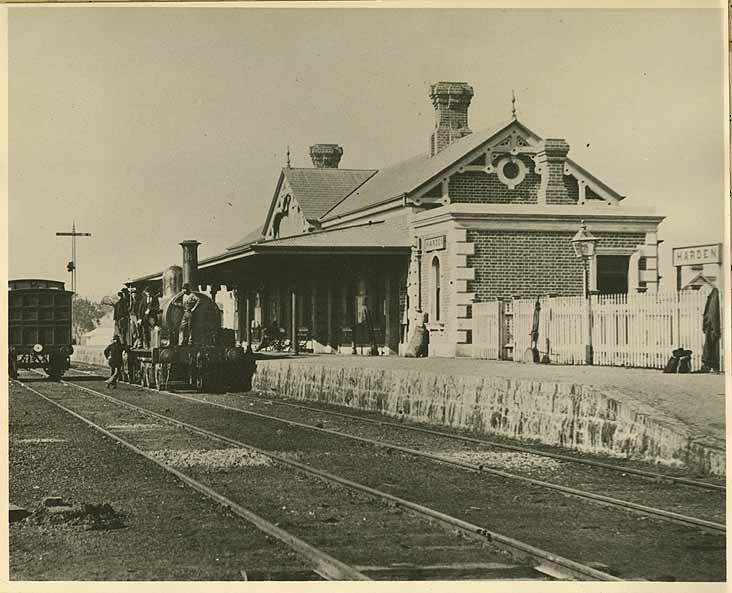
The station c.1889

Harden station opened on 12 March 1877 as Murrumburrah when the Main South line was extended from Binalong. It served as the terminus until the line was extended to Cootamundra on 1 November 1877. It was renamed North Murrumburrah on 5 September 1878 and finally Harden on 1 September 1880. In 1914, the platform was converted to an island platform as part of the duplication of the line.

In 1885, Harden became a junction station with the opening of the Blayney–Demondrille line as far as Young, ultimately reaching Blayney in 1888. Although it branched off the Main South line six kilometres south of the station at Demondrille, Harden was the terminus for many services and became an important railway town gaining a locomotive depot that lasted until the late 1960s.

A CPH railmotor connected with the Riverina Express and South Mail until replaced by a road coach in November 1983.

Until the closure of the Blayney-Demondrille line in August 2009, Harden was a popular destination for Lachlan Valley Railway steam locomotive hauled trains from Cowra with an operational turntable maintained.

== Services ==
Harden is served by two daily NSW TrainLink XPT services in each direction operating between Sydney and Melbourne, and a twice weekly NSW TrainLink Xplorer between Griffith and Sydney split from Canberra services at Goulburn. NSW TrainLink also operate a road coach service from Queanbeyan to Cootamundra via Harden station. This station is a request stop for the Melbourne XPT & the Sydney-bound Griffith Xplorer, so these services stop only if passengers booked to board/alight here.

Platform	Line	Stopping pattern	Notes
1	Southern Region	services to Sydney Central, Griffith & Melbourne	request stop for these services: Melbourne XPT & Sydney-bound Griffith Xplorer (booked passengers only)

== Description ==
The station consists of a second-class brick station building of a type 3 design and brick platforms, dating from 1877 with alterations in 1881 and 1919, two-storey refreshment rooms dating from 1884, a signal box with a hip roof dating from 1912, and the stationmaster's residence located at 51 Whitton Street. Remains of the former engine shed, turntable and coal stage support are included in the station's heritage listing.

== Heritage listing ==
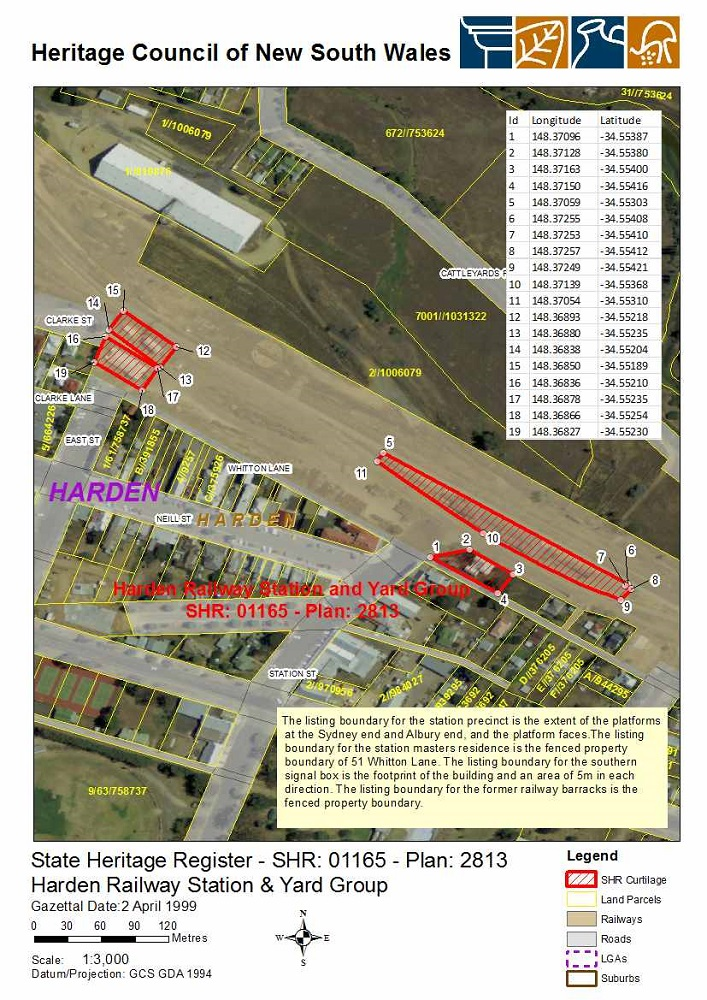
Heritage boundaries

Harden is a good example of a substantial station building and refreshment room complex that was designed for single line operation and converted to double track operation by adding a rear platform to the original street frontage and providing a subway to gain access to the station. The station has undergone a number of alterations, retains its early form and exhibits clearly the changes that have taken place. The signal boxes are excellent examples of large boxes from a major depot, most of the facilities of which have now been removed. They demonstrate two varying style of construction. The remains of the former engine depot are reminders when Harden was a major engine servicing and changing station from the 1880s until replaced by Demondrille in 1922.

Harden railway station was listed on the New South Wales State Heritage Register on 2 April 1999 having satisfied the following criteria.

The place possesses uncommon, rare or endangered aspects of the cultural or natural history of New South Wales.

This item is assessed as historically rare. This item is assessed as scientifically rare. This item is assessed as arch. rare. This item is assessed as socially rare.
