= 1st Australian Horse =

- Active: 1897–1902
- Country: New South Wales (1897–1901) Australia (1901–1902)
- Allegiance: British Empire
- Branch: Army
- Type: Mounted infantry
- Size: Men: 141 Horses:157
- Engagements: Second Boer War
- Decorations: Distinguished Conduct Medal
- Battle honours: South Africa: 1899-1900

The 1st Australian Horse was a mounted infantry regiment of the Colony of New South Wales that was formed in 1897. The 1st Australian Horse wore distinctive myrtle green uniforms with black embroidery.

== History ==
=== Formation ===
The regiment was raised on 28 August 1897 at Murrumburrah, New South Wales, as the 1st Australian (Volunteer) Horse. The unit recruited primarily from New South Wales, and had detachments in Murrumburrah, Gunnedah, Gundagai, Quirinidi, Mudgee, and various other NSW towns.

=== Second Boer War ===
When the Second Boer War began in late 1899, New South Wales raised multiple contingents which included detachments from the regiment. The first contingent left Newcastle on 14 November 1899 for Cape Town, South Africa, arriving on 13 December, with a second contingent leaving Sydney on 17 January 1900, arriving 23 February.. Two detachments of the regiment served under General John French's Cavalry Division during the Second Boer War in 1899, composed of 141 men and 157 horses. The first detachment fought in the Battle of Slingersfontein on 16 January 1900 resulting in heavy casualties, and the first Australian casualty of the war. The unit then participated in the Battle of Poplar Grove and took part in occupying the towns of Driefontein and Bloemfontein. The regiment also took part in both the advance to Pretoria and the Battle of Zand River, as well as the subsequent Surrender of Pretoria on 1 June. They also saw action in the Battle of Belfast in 1901, where General Kitchener commended the 1st Australian Horse for its "gallant conduct"; later withdrawing from South Africa by late March of the same year, arriving back in Sydney on 2 May on board the transport ship Tongariro.

== Commanding officer ==
- MacKay, James Alexander Kenneth (Kenneth Mackay)
