= Demondrille railway station =

Historic site in New South Wales, Australia

Demondrille
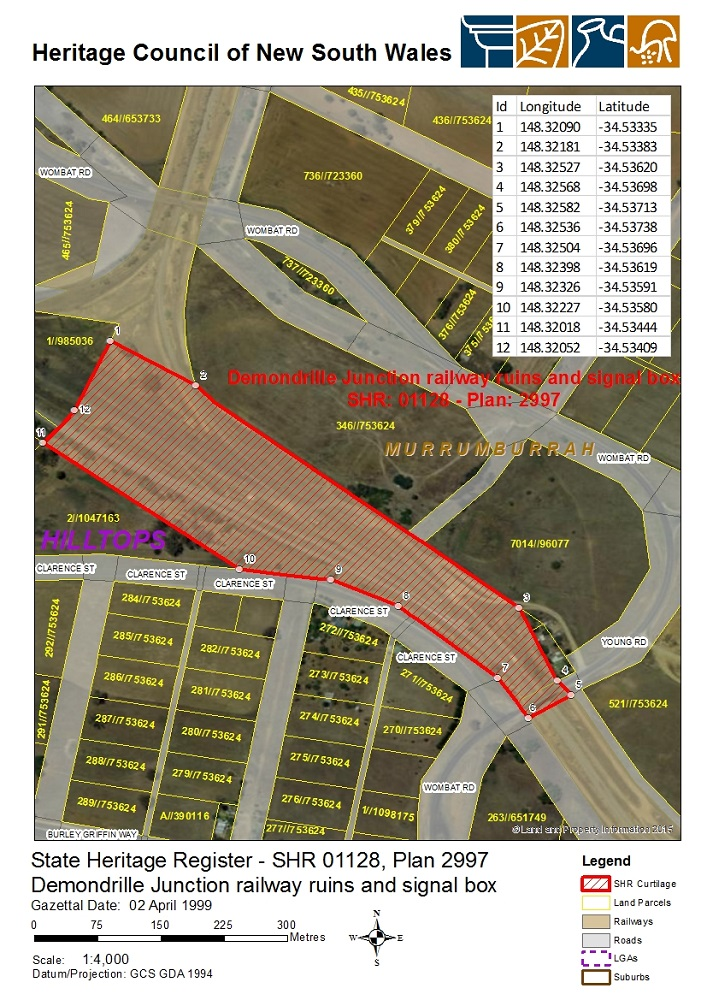
- Heritage boundaries

General information
- Location: Station Street, Murrumburrah, New South Wales; Australia
- Coordinates: 34°32′08″S 148°19′24″E
- Operator: Public Transport Commission
- Lines: Main Southern line Blayney–Demondrille line
- Distance: 391.600 km from Central
- Platforms: 4 (2 island)
- Tracks: 8

Construction
- Structure type: Ground

Other information
- Status: Closed

History
- Opened: 23 March 1885
- Closed: 9 October 1974
- Rebuilt: 1900; 1922
- Former names: Demondrille Junction (1885-1940)

Services
Preceding station	Former services	Following station
Nubba towards Albury	Main Southern Line	Murrumburrah towards Sydney
Young towards Blayney	Blayney–Demondrille Line	Murrumburrah towards Harden
Location

Demondrille railway station (pron. de MON drill) is a heritage-listed disused railway station on the Main Southern line serving the town of Murrumburrah, New South Wales, Australia. The station was located at the junction of the Blayney–Demondrille line and the Main Southern line. It consisted of a pair of island platforms, one on the mainline and one on the branchline, with a pair of signal boxes controlling the junction, which was formerly a triangle junction.

== History ==
The station opened in 1885 as Demondrille Junction, and was moved, rebuilt and reopened on both 13 May 1900 and 17 July 1922. In April 1940, the station was renamed Demondrille, and continued to serve passengers until it closed in 1974. The mainline platforms were demolished but the branch line platforms were left disused.

The remains of the railway precinct at Demondrille were added to the New South Wales State Heritage Register on 2 April 1999.

The Demondrille signal box was demolished in September 2024.

== Locomotive servicing facility ==
During the years of steam locomotives, the Demondrille station precinct was a major online locomotive servicing facility. Trains could leave the main line and run through the facility and receive additional coal, undergo ash removal, and later receive water, without uncoupling from trains. The facility became operational between March and June 1923 and was upgraded for passenger trains in 1945. The coal stage was decommissioned after the last "up"(i.e. towards Sydney) steam-hauled passenger train on 20 June 1964, and the remaining coal removed three days later.
