= Stockinbingal railway station =

Former railway station in New South Wales, Australia

Stockinbingal
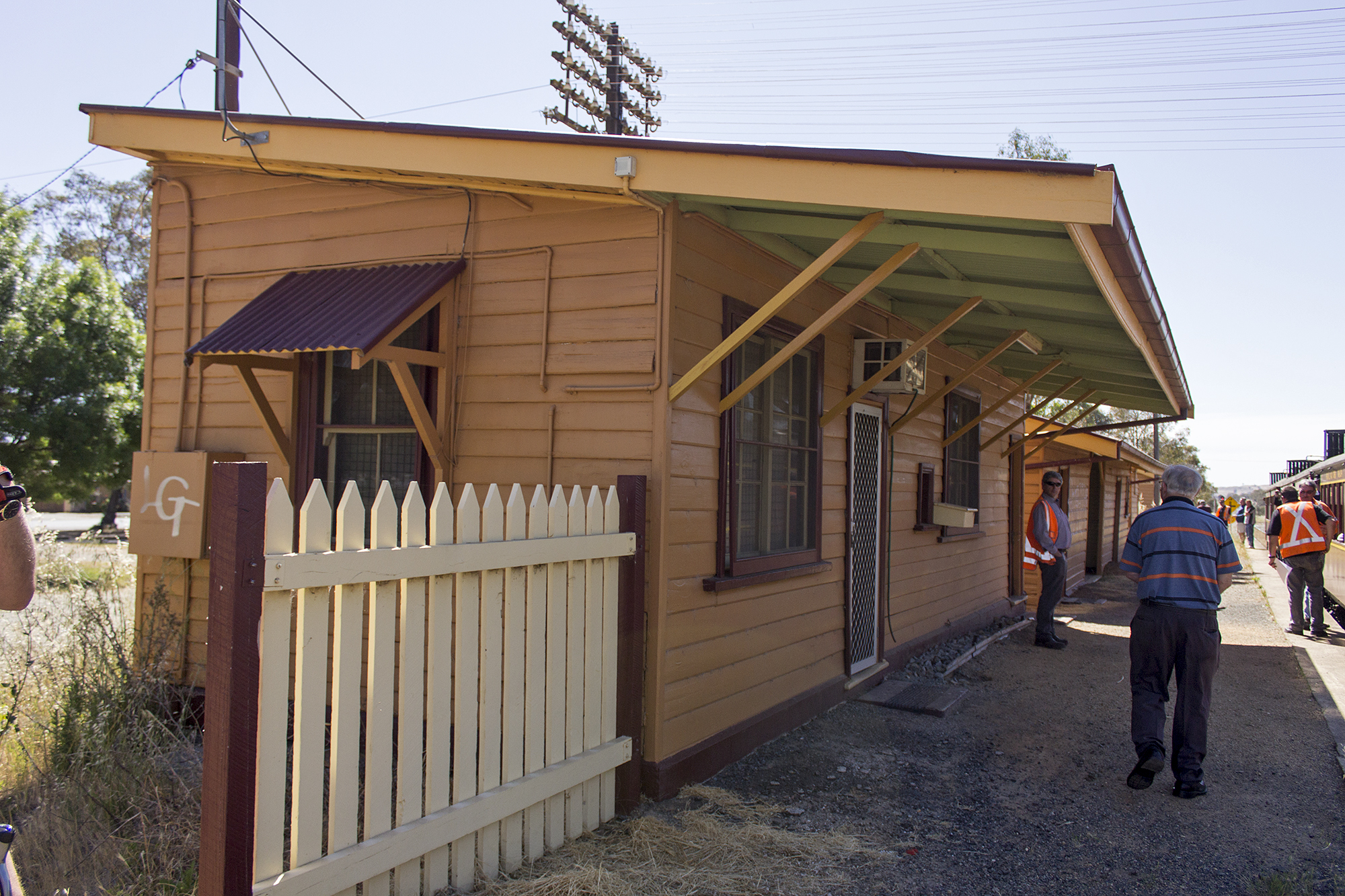

General information
- Location: Stockinbingal; New South Wales, Australia
- Coordinates: 34°30′02″S 147°52′47″E
- Owner: Transport Asset Manager of New South Wales
- Line: Lake Cargelligo branch line

History
- Opened: 1893
- Closed: 1983

Services
Preceding station	Former services	Following station
Gundibindyal towards Lake Cargelligo	Lake Cargelligo Line	Cootamundra West towards Cootamundra
Terminus	Stockinbingal–Parkes Line	Milvale towards Parkes
Location

Stockinbingal is a disused passenger railway station on the Lake Cargelligo railway line in New South Wales, Australia. The station opened in 1893 and closed to passenger services in 1983. The station survives largely intact, in good condition, as a safeworking location. Stockinbingal is the junction location of the cross country line to Parkes on the Broken Hill line.

The station still has a short crossing loop, and a junction for the line to Temora.
