= Cootamundra West railway station =

Former railway station in New South Wales, Australia

Cootamundra West
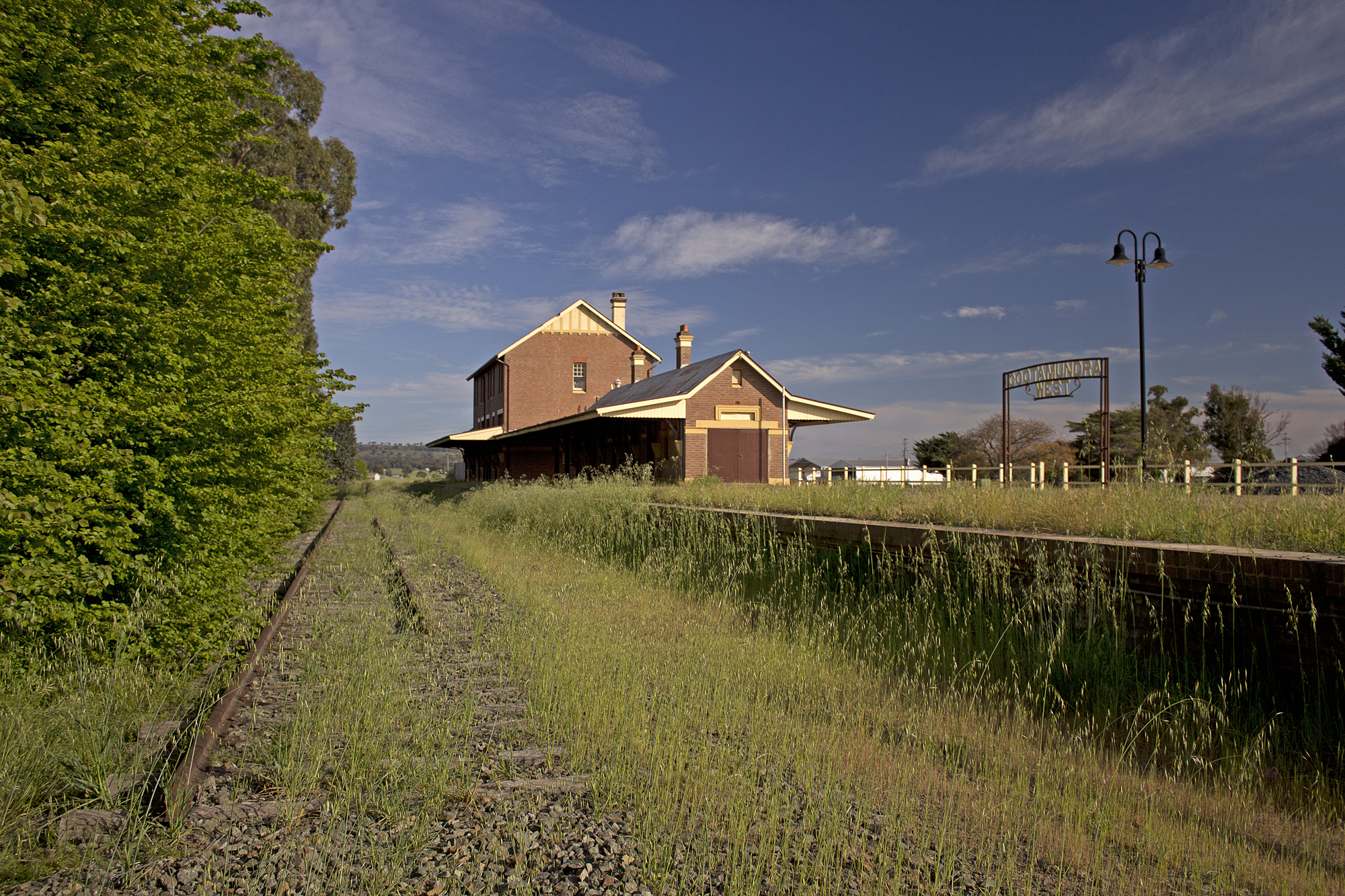
- The remains of the branch lines and adjacent platform, October 2011

General information
- Location: Yass Road, Cootamundra, New South Wales; Australia
- Coordinates: 34°37′52″S 148°02′05″E
- Owner: Transport Asset Manager of New South Wales
- Line: Lake Cargelligo
- Distance: 431.00 km from Central
- Platforms: 2 (1 island)
- Tracks: 4

Construction
- Structure type: Ground

History
- Opened: 22 March 1911
- Closed: 1983

Services
Preceding station	Former services	Following station
Stockinbingal towards Lake Cargelligo	Lake Cargelligo Line	Cootamundra Terminus
Location

Cootamundra West railway station is a heritage-listed former railway station on the Lake Cargelligo line located in Cootamundra, New South Wales, Australia. It lies approximately 2 kilometres (1.2 mi) NNE of Cootamundra railway station. The property was added to the New South Wales State Heritage Register on 2 April 1999.

== History ==
The station opened in 1911. As part of works to duplicate the Main Southern railway line between Wallendbeen and Cootamundra in 1916, more substantial station facilities were built at the station to allow passengers on the Lake Cargelligo branch line to avoid the need to stop in Cootamundra proper. A refreshment room operated until 25 May 1930; after this date, the Temora mail train would continue to Cootamundra railway station and only make a two minute stop at Cootamundra West. Amid a housing shortage in 1949, it was proposed to convert the station buildings into accommodation for railway workers, many of who were living in tents. By 1954 however, the station had instead been renovated as office space for the district superintendent and staff.

The station has been closed since 1983 when passenger services along the branch were withdrawn, although freight has continued to use the line. It was subsequently used by CADAS (Cootamundra Amateur Dramatic Arts Society) Juniors as a rehearsal space.

== Description ==
The station complex consists of a double-storey, type 11 brick station building and brick-faced platform dating from 1911 as well as the former refreshment room. It survives in good condition.

== Gallery ==
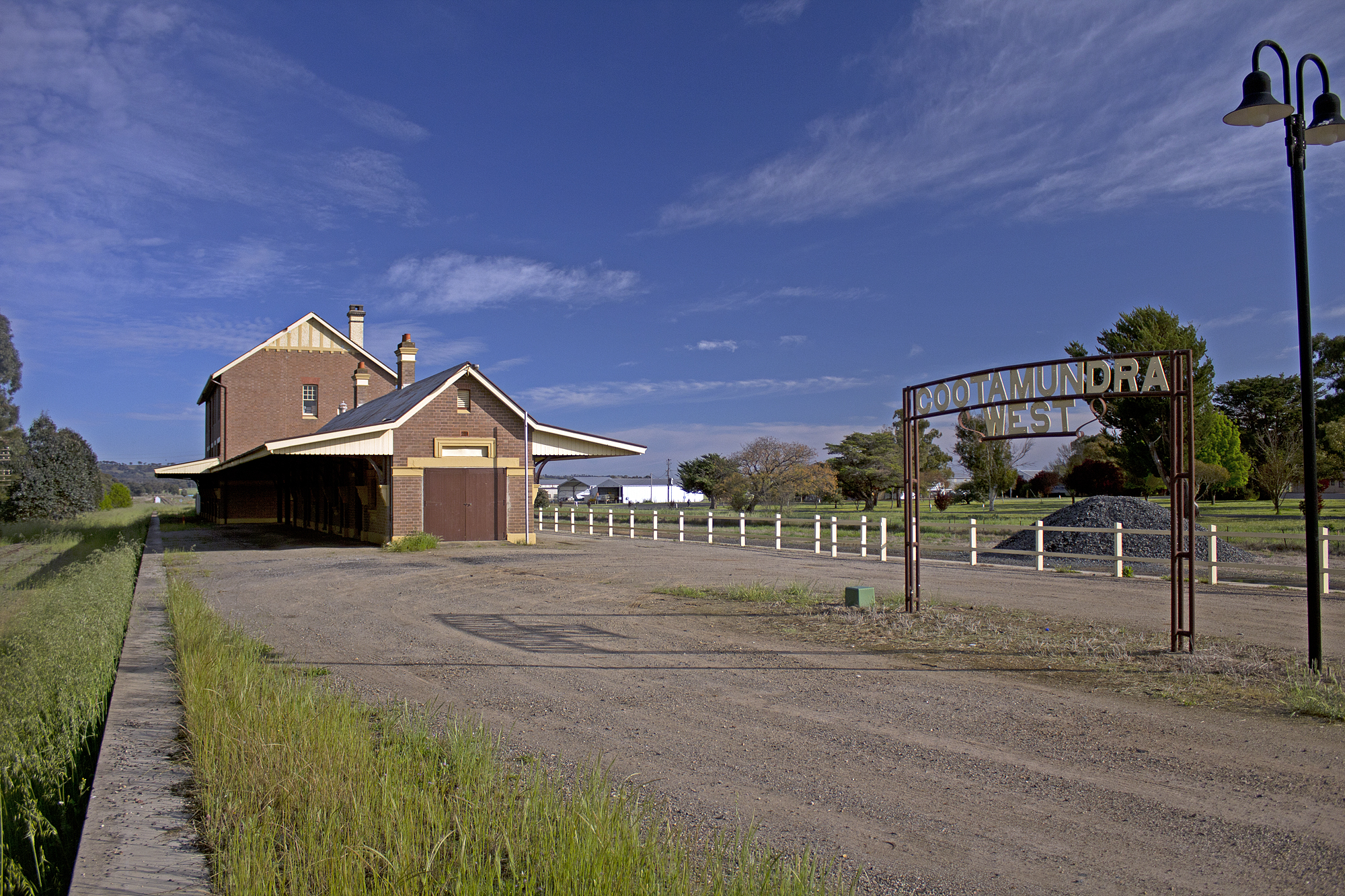
Branch line platform looking towards Lake Cargelligo

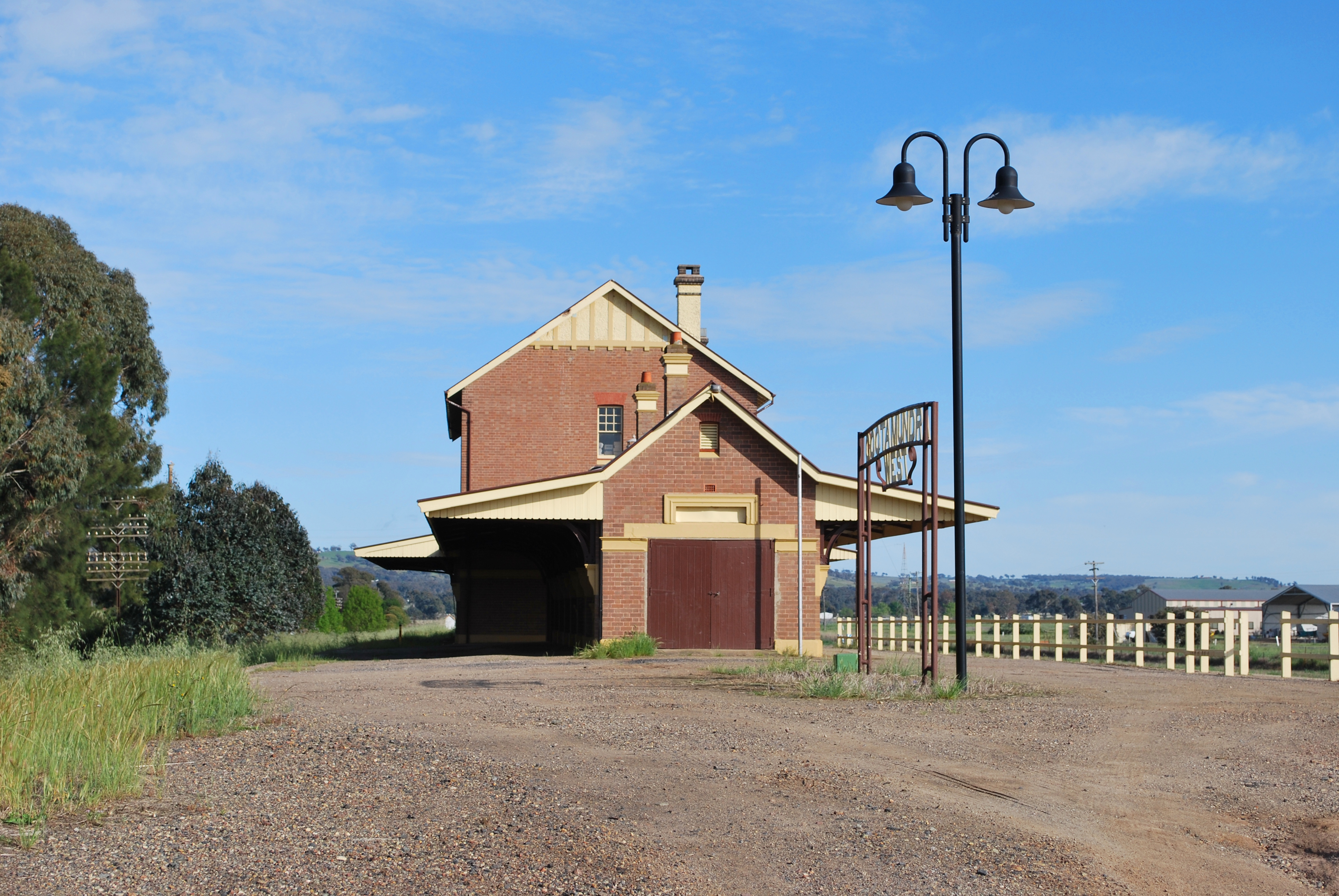
The buildings from platform level

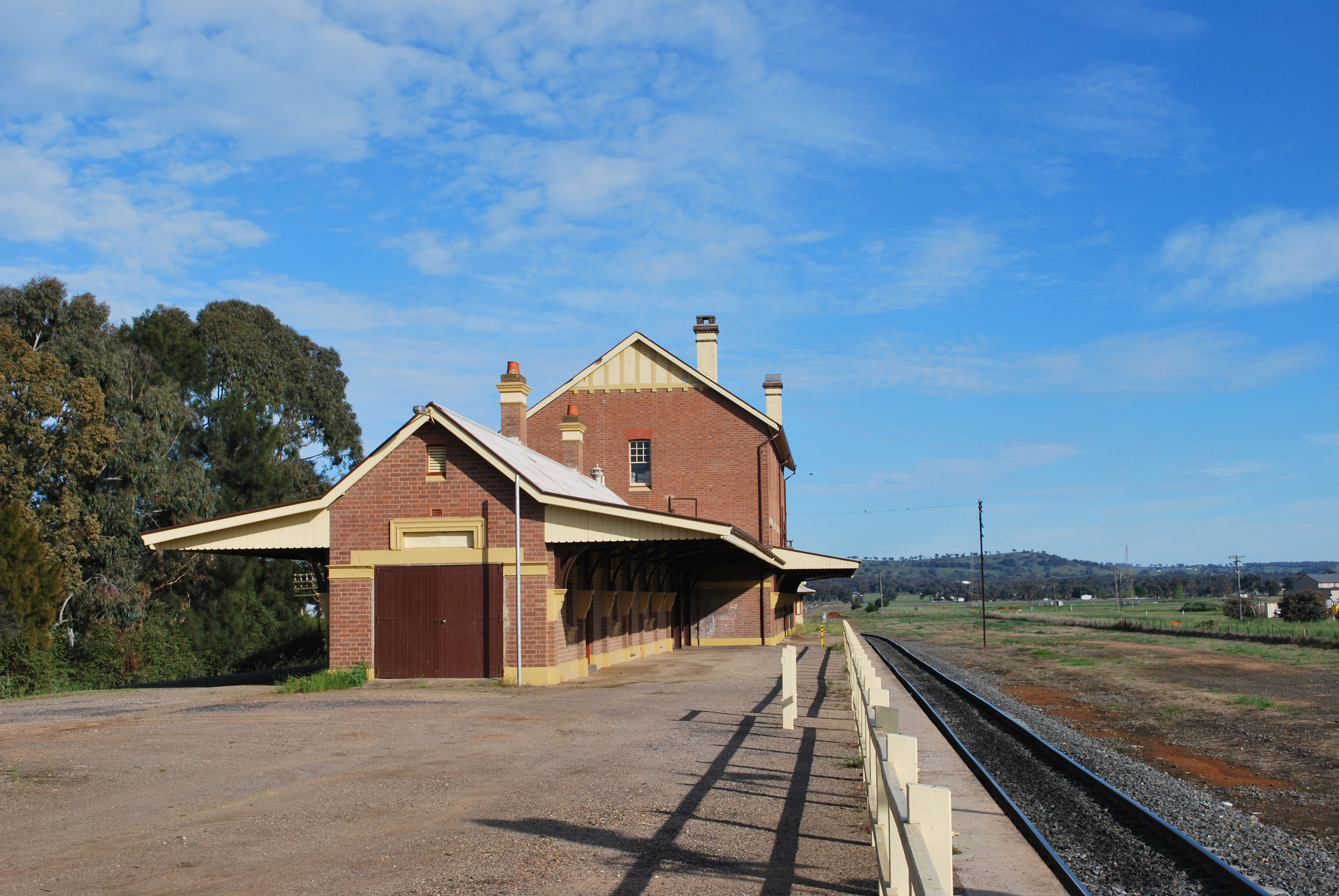
Main line platform looking towards Lake Cargelligo

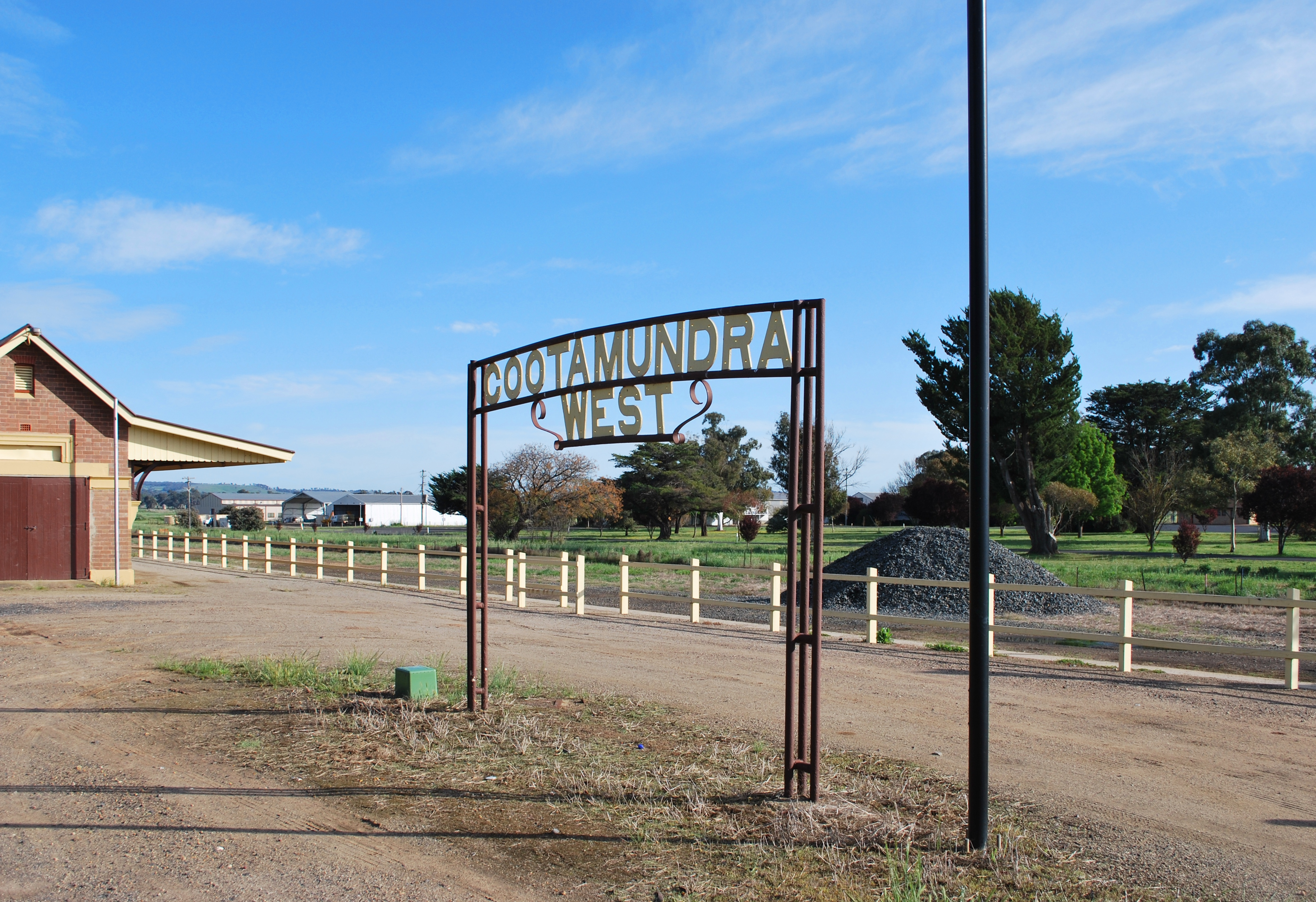
The unique station sign

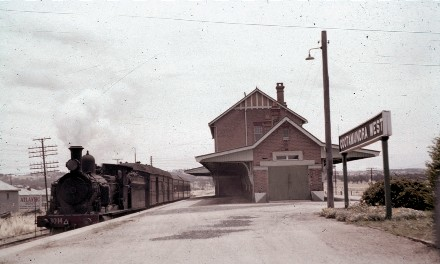
A steam train bound for Cootamundra at the station, November 1961

== Heritage listing ==
Cootamundra West is a major station building which was abandoned as a station because of the change of proposed route for the main southern line. It is one of the finest structures from the Edwardian period of railway building and is a good example of redundancy becoming obsolescence shortly after construction. The station group is a strong element in the townscape and of high significance in the development and history of railway construction. The building was used for many years as offices after its original purpose was changed.

Cootamundra West railway station was listed on the New South Wales State Heritage Register on 2 April 1999 having satisfied the following criteria.

The place possesses uncommon, rare or endangered aspects of the cultural or natural history of New South Wales.

This item is assessed as historically rare. This item is assessed as scientifically rare. This item is assessed as socially rare.

== See also ==
- Cootamundra railway station
