= Milvale =

- Suburb
- Coordinates: 34°19′S 147°55′E
- Country: Australia
- State: New South Wales
- LGA: Hilltops Council
- Location: 43 km (27 mi) W of Young; 42 km (26 mi) E of Temora

Government
  - State electorate: Cootamundra
  - Federal division: Riverina
- Postcode: 2594
Suburbs around Milvale
Milvale
Stockinbingal

Milvale is a small village in southern New South Wales, Australia. The locality is in the Hilltops Council local government area.

At the 2016 census the population of Milvale was 67, which had increased to 89 at the 2021 census.

== Transport ==
In 2011, the short crossing loops were extended to 1,850 metres (6,070 ft).

Preceding station	Former services	Following station
Stockinbingal Terminus	Stockinbingal–Parkes Line	Forbes towards Parkes
