= Tullibigeal =

- Town
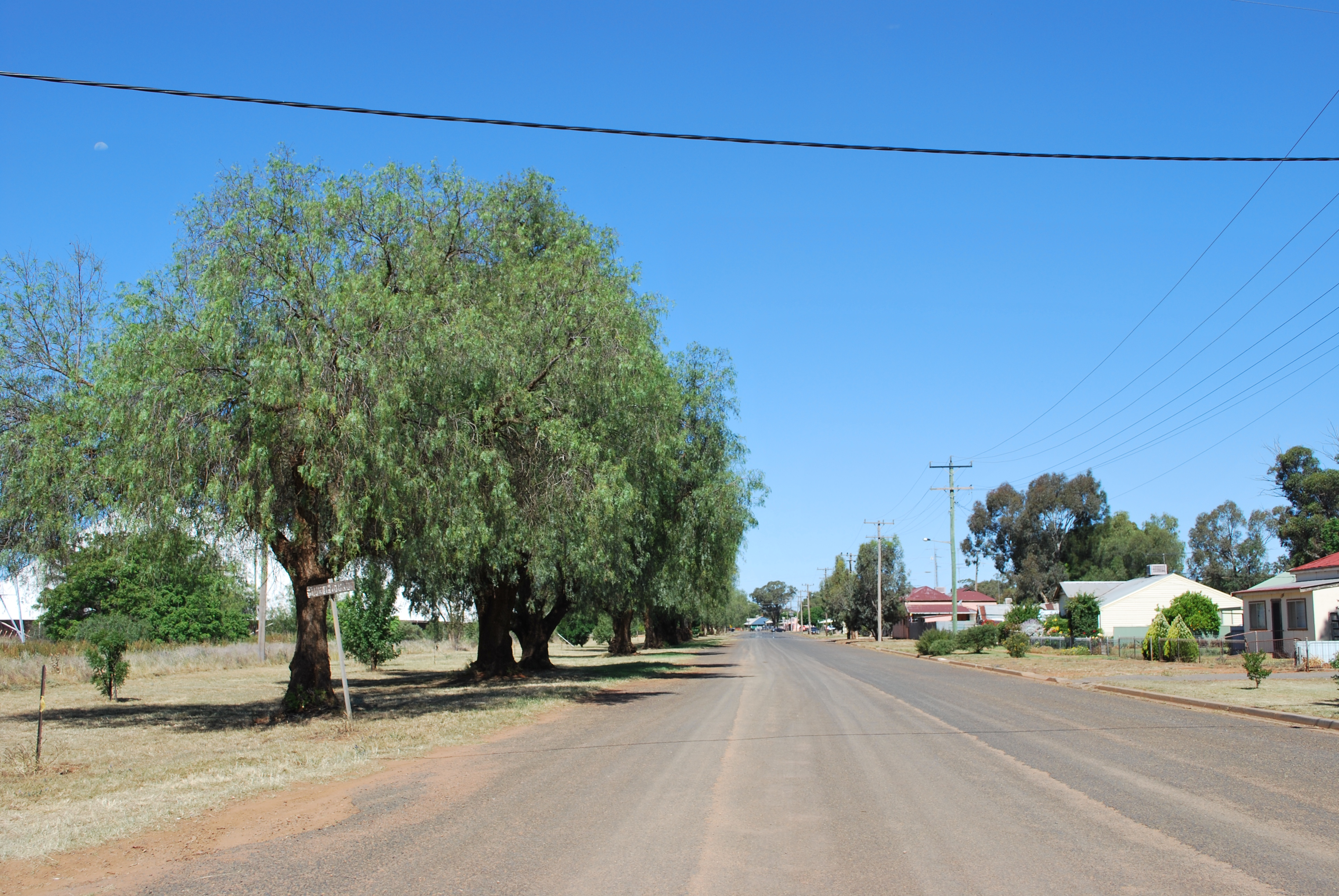
- Cargelligo Street in Tullibigeal

- Coordinates: 33°25′S 146°43′E
- Country: Australia
- State: New South Wales
- LGA: Lachlan Shire
- Location: 547 km (340 mi) W of Sydney; 177 km (110 mi) NE of Griffith; 70 km (43 mi) NW of West Wyalong; 57 km (35 mi) S of Condobolin; 44 km (27 mi) SE of Lake Cargelligo

Government
  - State electorate: Barwon
  - Federal division: Parkes
- Elevation: 296 m (971 ft)

Population
  - Total: 263 (2021 census)
- Postcode: 2669

Tullibigeal is a small farming community in the Central West region of New South Wales, Australia. At the 2021 census, it had a population of 263.

== Etymology ==
The name is an Aboriginal word for "yarran wooden spears", yarran being a native species of acacia.

== History ==
Tullibigeal Post Office opened on 1 April 1918. The railway was connected in 1917.

== Demographics ==
At the 2021 census, Tullibigeal and the surrounding area had a population of 263. The population was both older and more homogeneous than the Australian average, with 32.4% of residents over 55 years compared to a national average of 29.1%, and only 16.7% born overseas compared to a national figure of 33.1%. More than 86% of residents spoke only English at home.

In religion, Tullibigeal is predominantly Christian with the major religious denominations being Catholic (26.6%), Uniting (18.3%) and Anglican (15.2%). 20.5% of the population said they had no religion, which was just over half of the national average of 38.4%.

== Economy ==
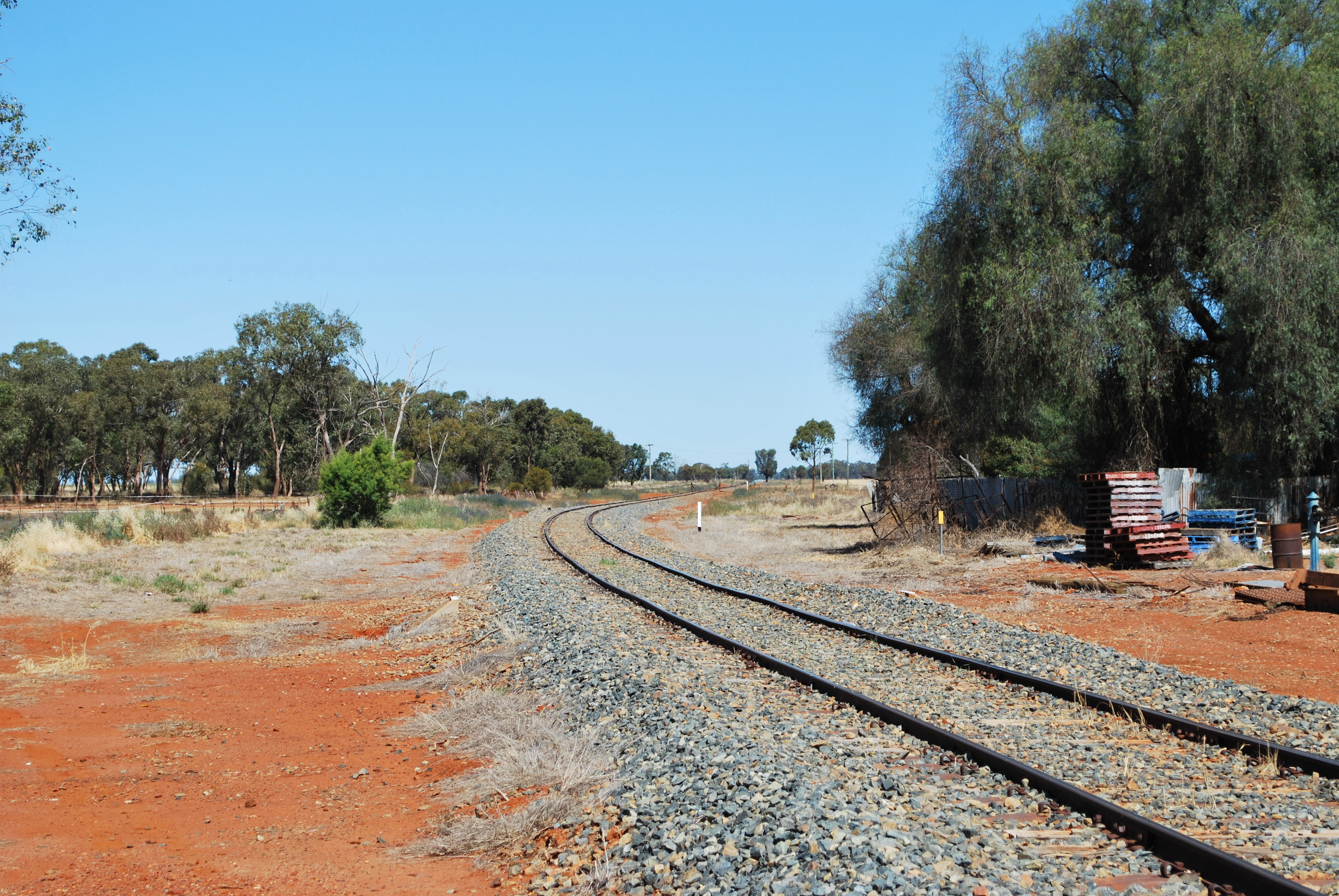
The line at Tullibigeal

The main industries are sheep and cattle farming and grain cropping, collectively employing 62% of the Tullibigeal workforce. Median income was A$409 per week, significantly below the national average of $466.

Grain transport from Tullibigeal is provided via direct access to the rail line between Lake Cargelligo and Temora, with large grain silos located along the tracks near the town.

== Notable people ==
The town and surrounding district have produced several notable sportspeople including Barry Glasgow who played for Western Suburbs and North Sydney in the NSW Rugby League competition in the 1960s and 1970s. Singer Shannon Noll grew up on a farm near Tullibigeal and went to school at the local Central school.

== Gallery ==
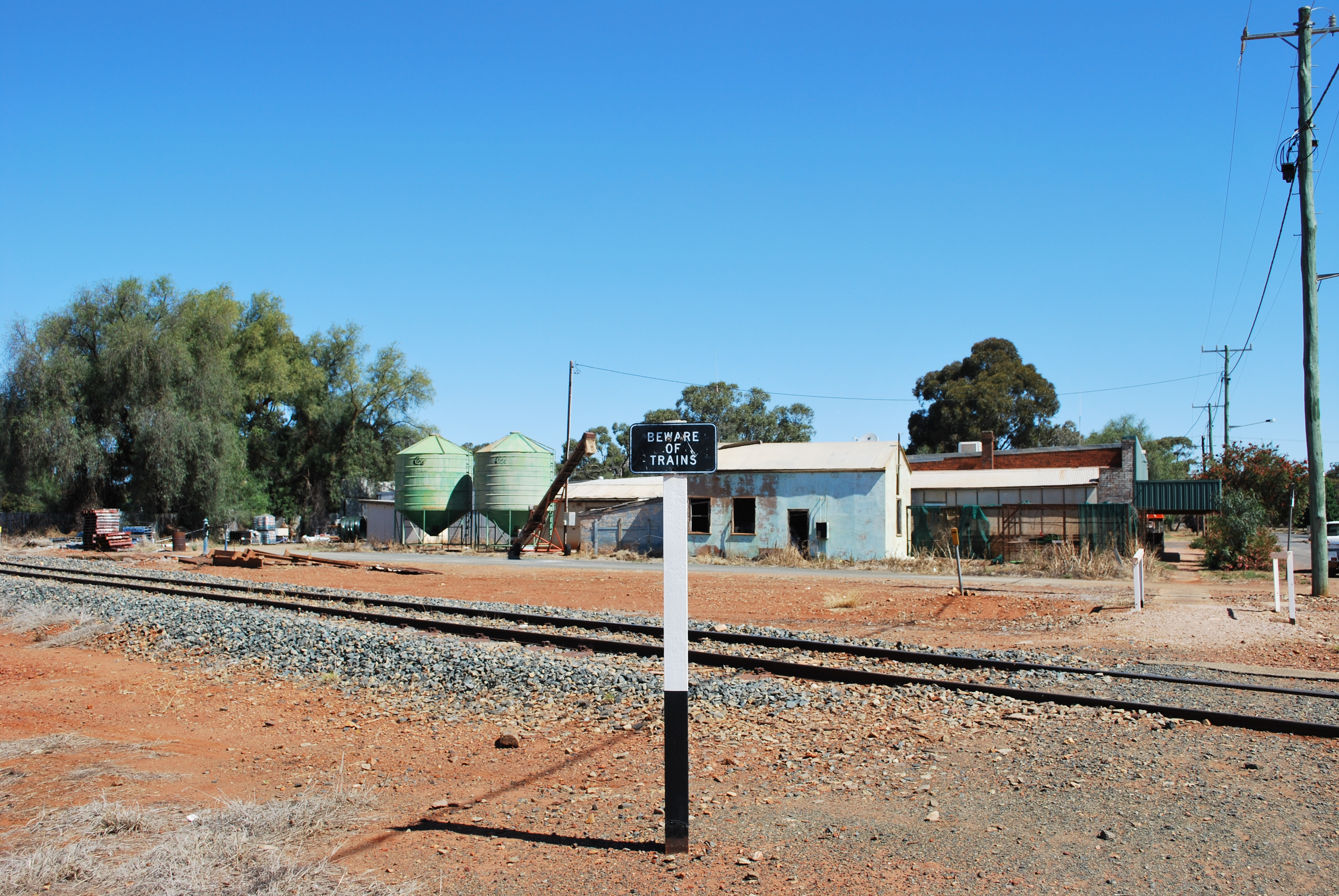
Tullibigeal crossing

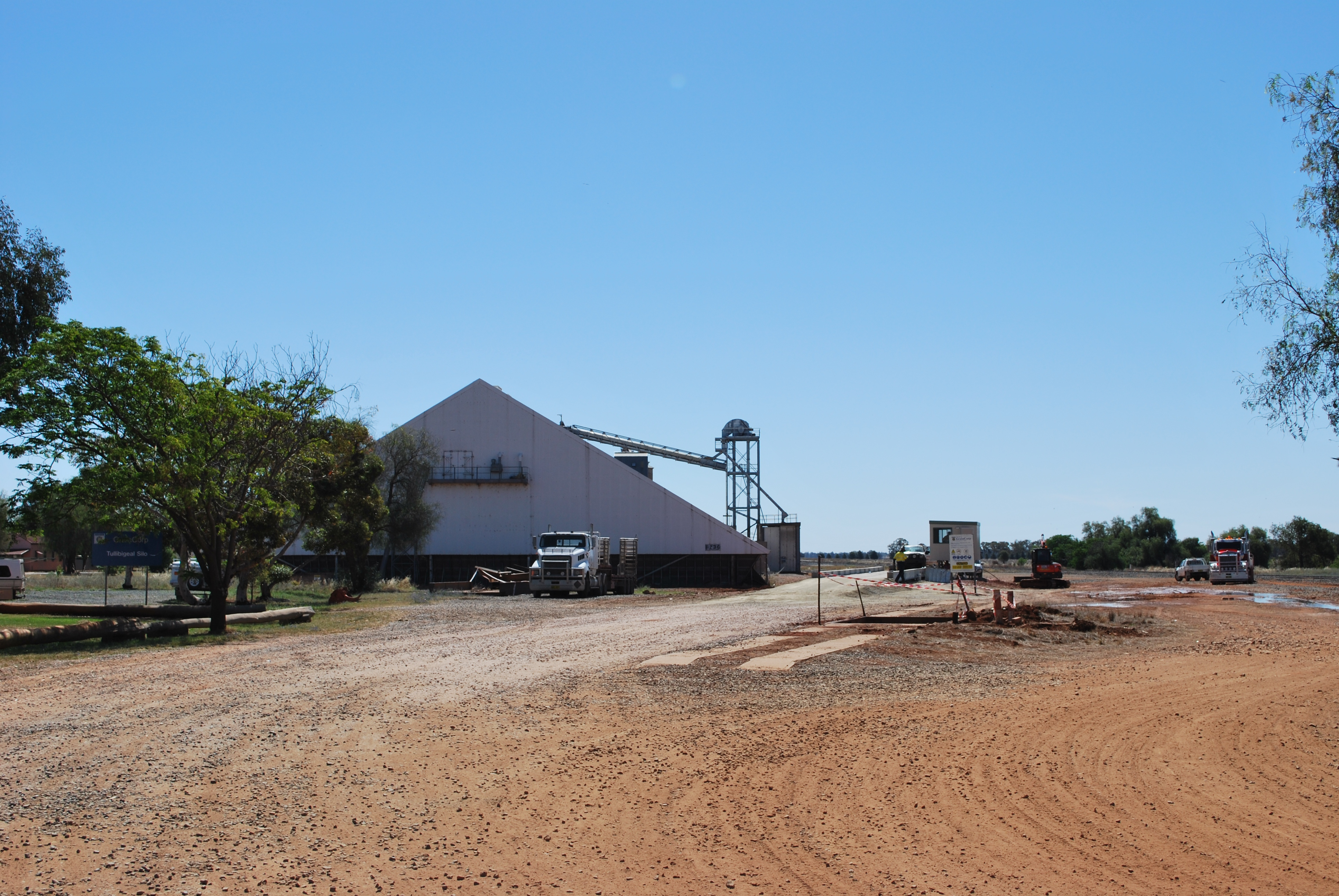
Tullibigeal Silo

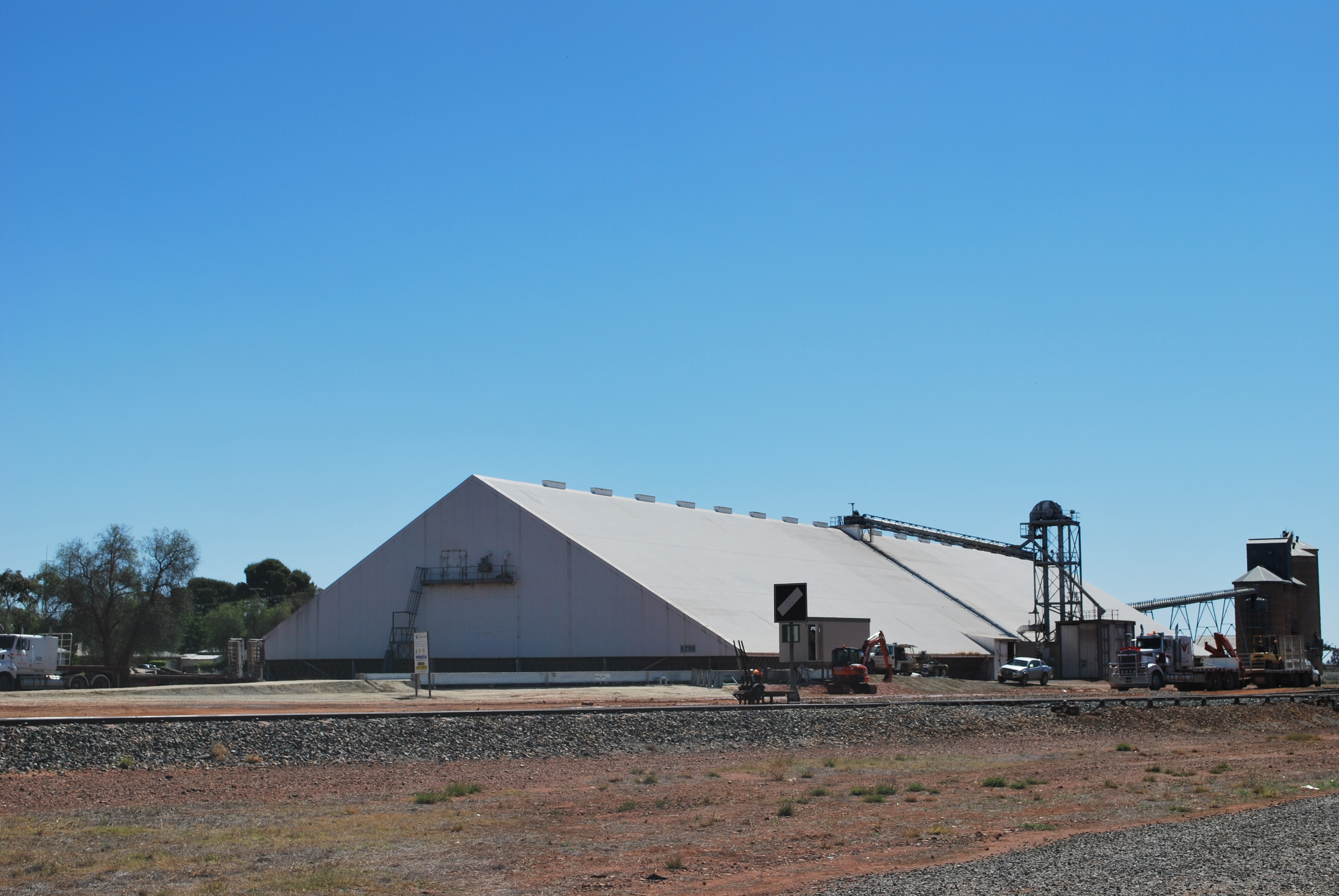
Tullibigeal Silo
