= Cootamundra railway station =

Railway station in New South Wales, Australia

Cootamundra
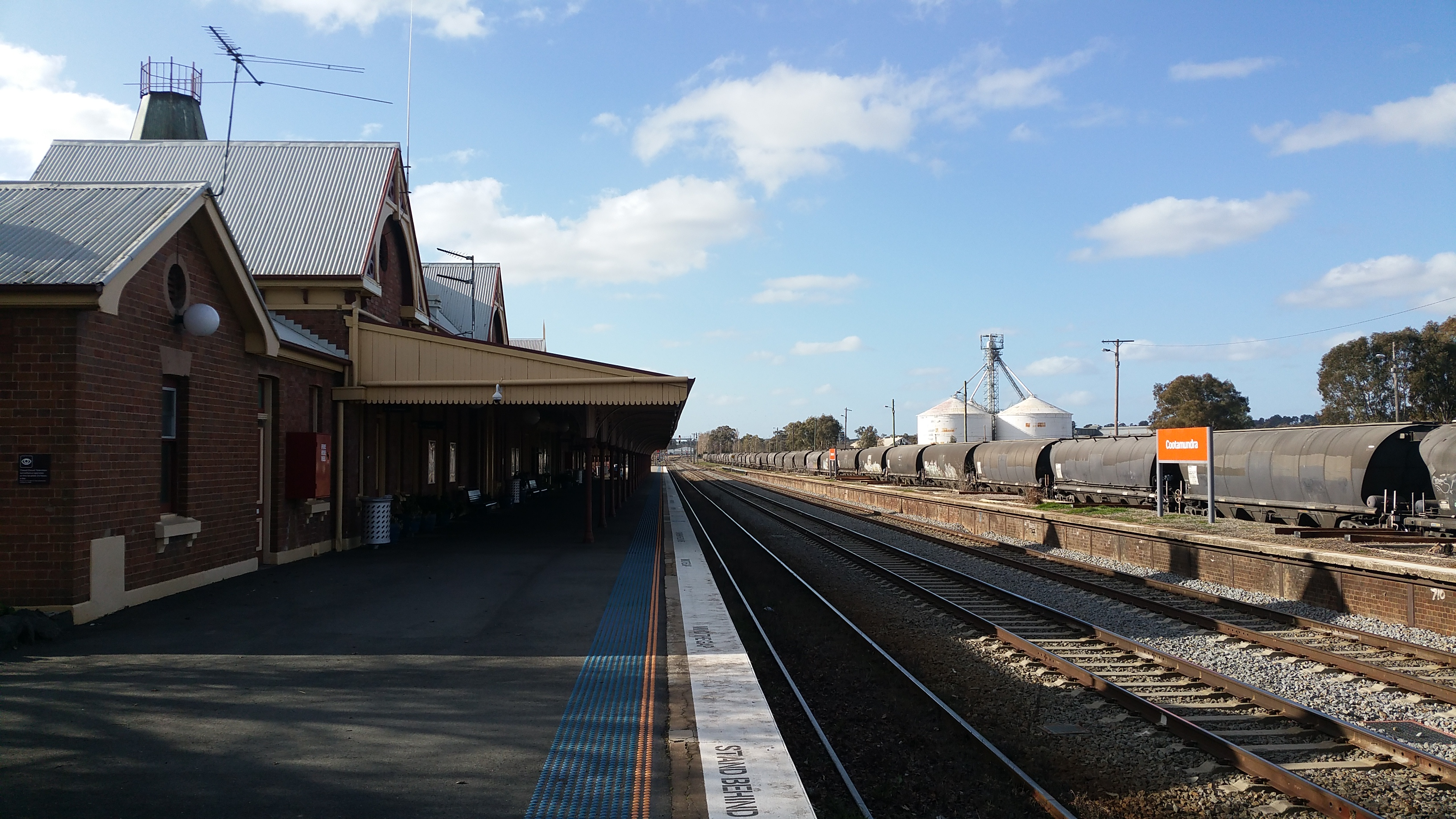
- Northbound view, April 2016

General information
- Location: Hovell Street, Cootamundra; Australia
- Coordinates: 34°38′29″S 148°01′49″E
- Owner: Transport Asset Manager of New South Wales
- Operator: NSW TrainLink
- Lines: Main Southern; Tumut & Kunama; Lake Cargelligo
- Distance: 429.65 kilometres (266.97 mi) from Central
- Platforms: 1
- Tracks: 3

Construction
- Structure type: Ground
- Accessible: Yes

Other information
- Station code: CMD

History
- Opened: 1 November 1877; 148 years ago
- Former names: Murrumburrah

Services
Preceding station	NSW TrainLink	Following station
Junee towards Griffith	NSW TrainLink Southern Line Griffith Xplorer	Harden towards Sydney
Junee towards Melbourne	NSW TrainLink Southern Line Melbourne XPT	Harden towards Sydney
Former services
Preceding station	Former services	Following station
Former NSW Main line services
Frampton towards Albury	Main Southern Line	Jindalee towards Sydney
Former NSW Branch line services
Brawlin towards Tumut	Tumut Line	Terminus
Cootamundra West towards Lake Cargelligo	Lake Cargelligo Line	Terminus
Location

Cootamundra railway station is located on the Main Southern line in New South Wales, Australia. It serves the town of Cootamundra. The property was added to the New South Wales State Heritage Register on 2 April 1999.

== History ==
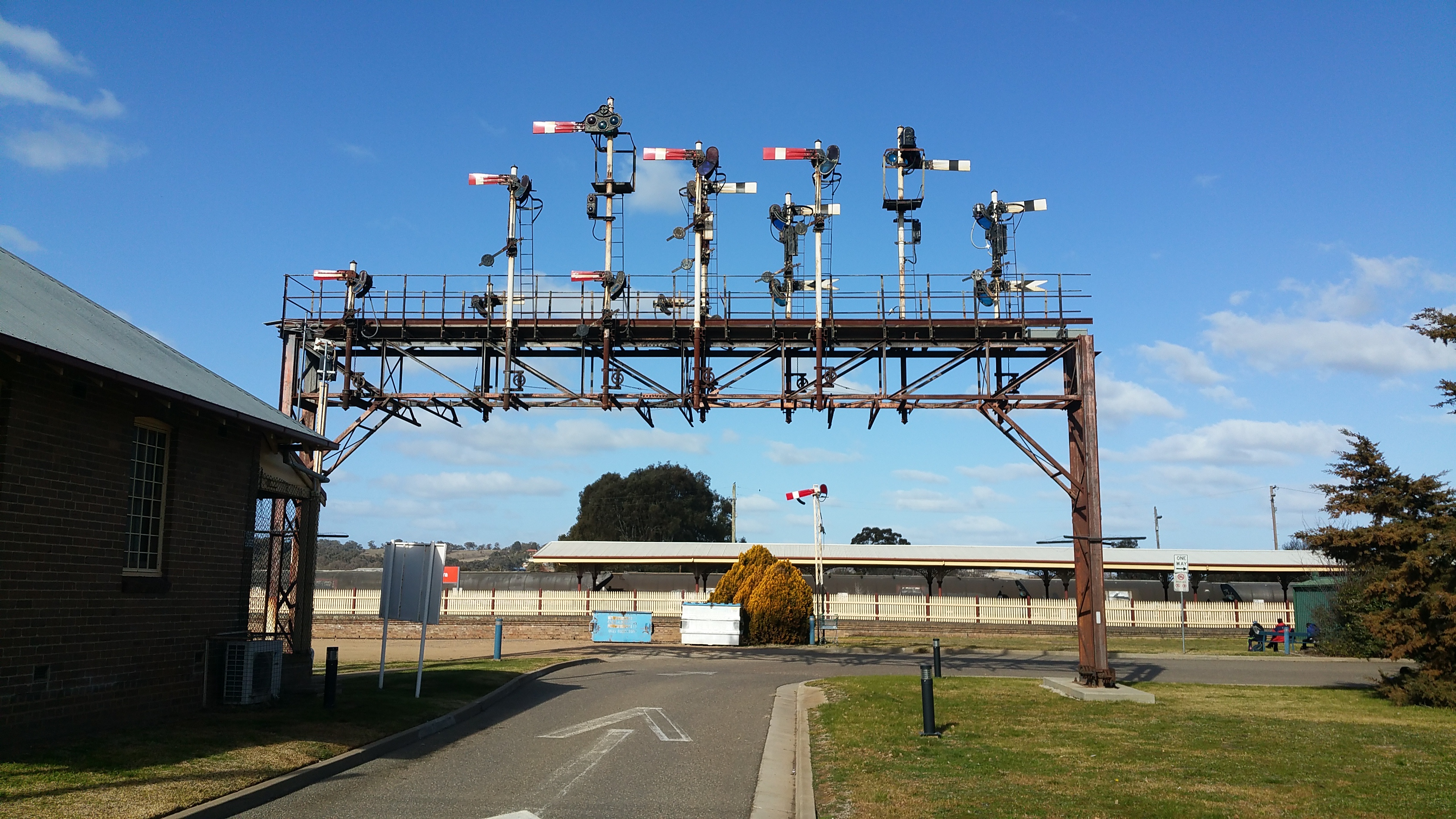
Historic signal gantry, 2018

Cootamundra station opened on 1 November 1877 when the Main South line was extended from Harden-Murrumburrah. It served as the terminus until the line was extended to Bethungra on 15 April 1878.

On 1 June 1886, Cootamundra became a junction station when the Tumut & Kunama line opened as far as Gundagai. On 1 September 1893, the Lake Cargelligo line opened as far as Temora.

In 1901, an island platform was built, this has since closed but remains in situ. In 1943, the line through Cootamundra was duplicated and a large signal gantry was erected to control train movements in the station area. After it was decommissioned in the 2000s, the gantry, with its signals, was preserved and moved to a nearby location, away from the tracks. It is probably the largest preserved signal gantry in the southern hemisphere.

The Lachlan Valley Railway has a base immediately south of the depot.

== Description ==
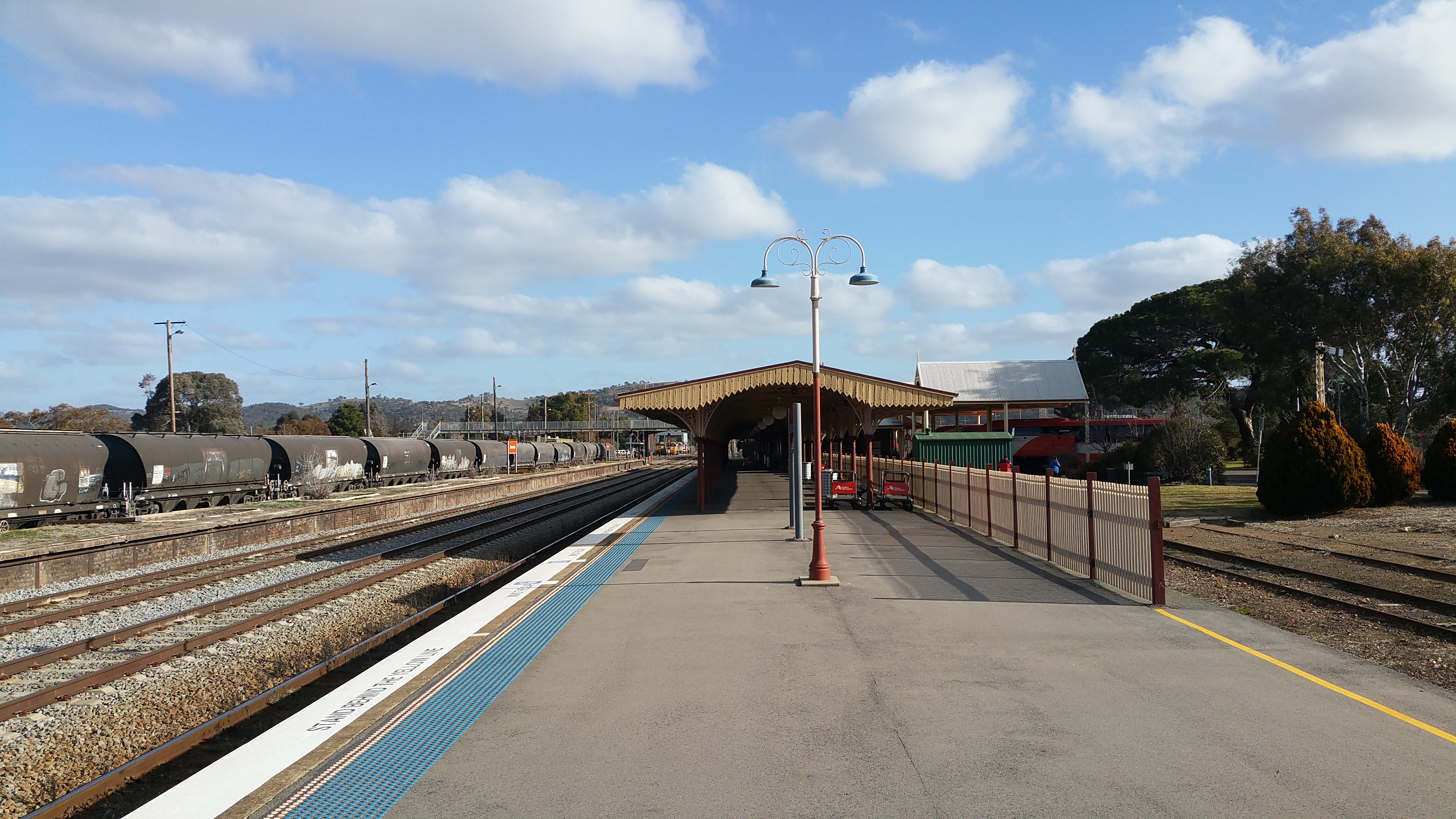
Southbound view on main platform, 2018

The station building is a type 5, first-class brick construction, originally dating from 1884, with alterations made in 1904–05, 1915 and 1943. The platforms are faced in brick. A refreshment room, dating from c. 1890 with 1904 additions, and disused since 2020, is sited on the up platform. The branch platform has an additional awning at the Sydney end, which is considered particularly fine.

The complex also include an asbestos cement-clad, flat-roofed signal box (1942), railway barracks (1932) and a type 3 gatekeeper's residence, located in Cowcumbla Street. The level crossing, steel pedestrian footbridge at south end, turntable, triangle junction and the station's trees, signs and lights, are also heritage-listed.

== Services ==
Cootamundra is served by two daily NSW TrainLink XPT services in each direction operating between Sydney and Melbourne, and a twice weekly NSW TrainLink Xplorer between Griffith and Sydney split from Canberra services at Goulburn. NSW TrainLink also operate road coach services from Cootamundra to Mildura, Tumbarumba, Queanbeyan, Bathurst, Dubbo and Condobolin.

Platform	Line	Stopping pattern	Notes
1	Southern Region	services to Sydney Central, Melbourne & Griffith	

== Heritage listing ==
Cootamundra is a major railway complex with a variety of buildings and an unusually designed first class station building not seen elsewhere. It is of significance both in the townscape and in the development of railways. The railway yard extending for almost the length of the town along its eastern boundary is a major element in the development of the town and the station buildings are at the terminus of one of the main streets in the town. The station building and its major platform awning are of particular significance with very fine detail in both the building and the cast iron columns and brackets of the canopy.

The station building has been largely altered over its history and is a good representation of the development of a major facility and the homogeneous way in which buildings can grow. In particular, architectural features such as marking the station entry with a tower over the entry vestibule demonstrate the building's significance. Another important feature of the site is the fine awning to the branch platform with use of cast iron panels and columns. It is one of the finest awnings in the State. The other elements of the site contribute to the understanding of it and illustrate how an extensive railway centre operated and was developed. The site also contains a number of mature trees that provide a pleasant setting for the complex.

Cootamundra railway station was listed on the New South Wales State Heritage Register on 2 April 1999 having satisfied the following criteria.

The place possesses uncommon, rare or endangered aspects of the cultural or natural history of New South Wales.

This item is assessed as historically rare. This item is assessed as scientifically rare. This item is assessed as arch. rare. This item is assessed as socially rare.

== See also ==
- Cootamundra West railway station
- Salt Clay Creek railway disaster
