= Lake Cargelligo Airport =

- IATA: none; ICAO: YLCG

Summary
- Airport type: Public
- Operator: Lachlan Shire Council
- Location: Lake Cargelligo, New South Wales
- Elevation AMSL: 555 ft / 169 m
- Coordinates: 33°16′42″S 146°22′12″E

Map
- Location in New South Wales

Runways
Direction	Length		Surface
Direction	m	ft	Surface
12/30	879	2,884	Clay
06/24	1,200	3,937	Gravel
- Sources: Australian AIP

Lake Cargelligo Airport (ICAO: YLCG) is located at Lake Cargelligo, New South Wales, Australia.

== See also ==
- List of airports in New South Wales
