= Stockinbingal =

Stockinbingal New South Wales
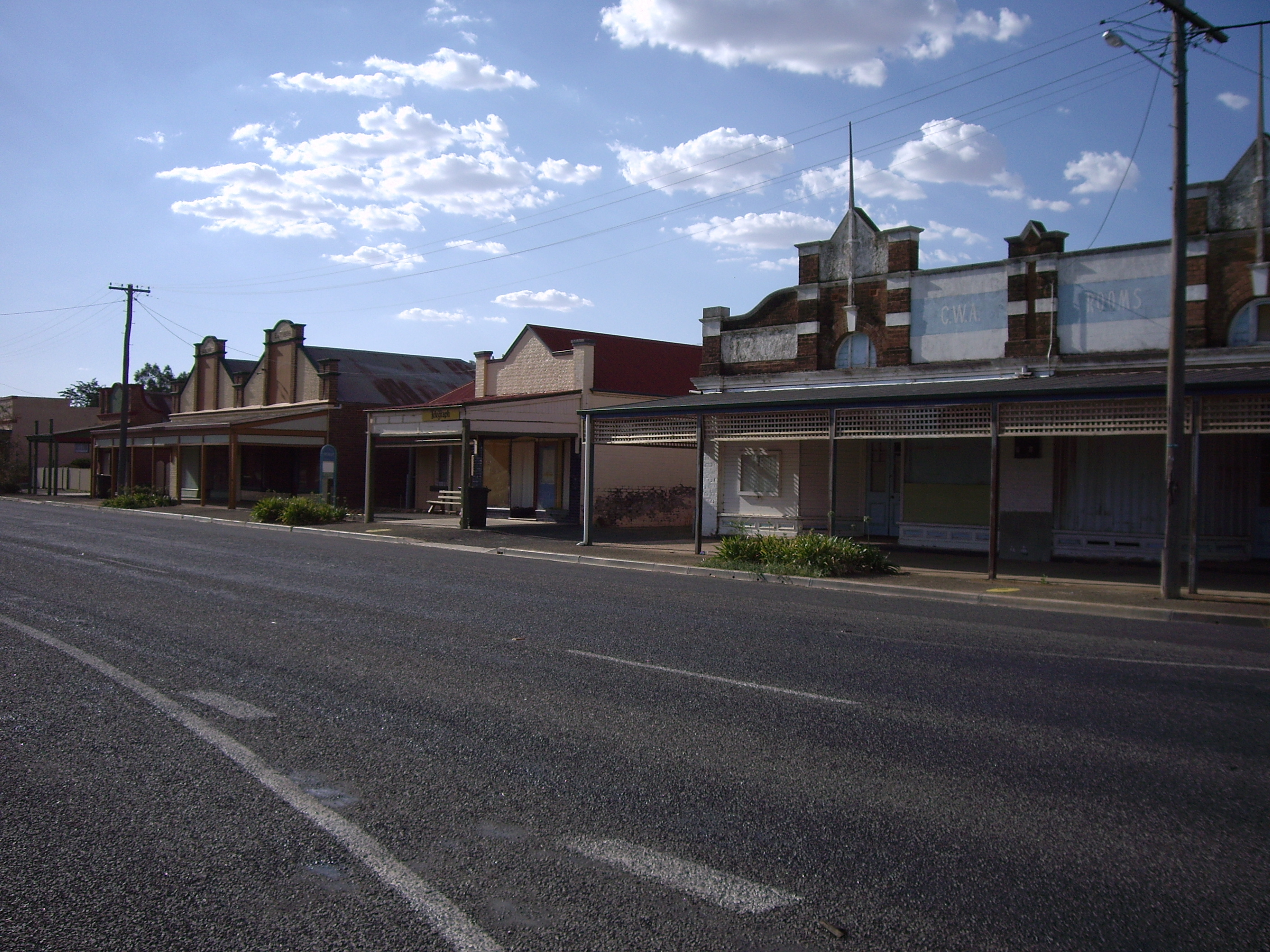
- Main Street of Stockinbingal, 2007

- Coordinates: 34°30′0″S 147°53′0″E
- Population: 374 (2016 census)
- Postcode(s): 2725
- Elevation: 303 m (994 ft)
- Location: 388 km (241 mi) SW of Sydney; 102 km (63 mi) NE of Wagga Wagga; 22 km (14 mi) NW of Cootamundra; 34 km (21 mi) E of Temora
- LGA(s): Gundagai Council
- County: Bland
- State electorate(s): Cootamundra
- Federal division(s): Riverina

Stockinbingal is a town in the South West Slopes and Riverina regions of New South Wales, Australia. The town is in the Cootamundra–Gundagai Regional Council local government area and on the Burley Griffin Way. At the 2016 census, Stockinbingal had a population of 374.

Stockinbingal Post Office opened on 16 May 1891.

== Railways ==
The town is the location of a railway junction connecting the Cootamundra to Lake Cargelligo railway line (completed to Stockinbingal in 1893) to Parkes. It provides an alternative route from Sydney to Parkes to that over the Blue Mountains, avoiding the steep grades of the Blue Mountains route and is, consequently, the major route for freight between Sydney and Perth. The route from Cootamundra to Stockinbingal and Parkes is also part of a rail bypass of Sydney for traffic between Melbourne and Brisbane via Dubbo, Werris Creek and Maitland.

== Yeo Yeo ==
Stockinbingal is the closest town to the Yeo Yeo district, where the Bradman family had a farm and where cricketer Don Bradman lived as a child. The shell of the old Yeo Yeo schoolhouse can be seen a few kilometres from town, on the road to Wallendbeen.

== See also ==
- Stockinbingal–Parkes railway line
- Stockinbingal railway station

== Gallery ==
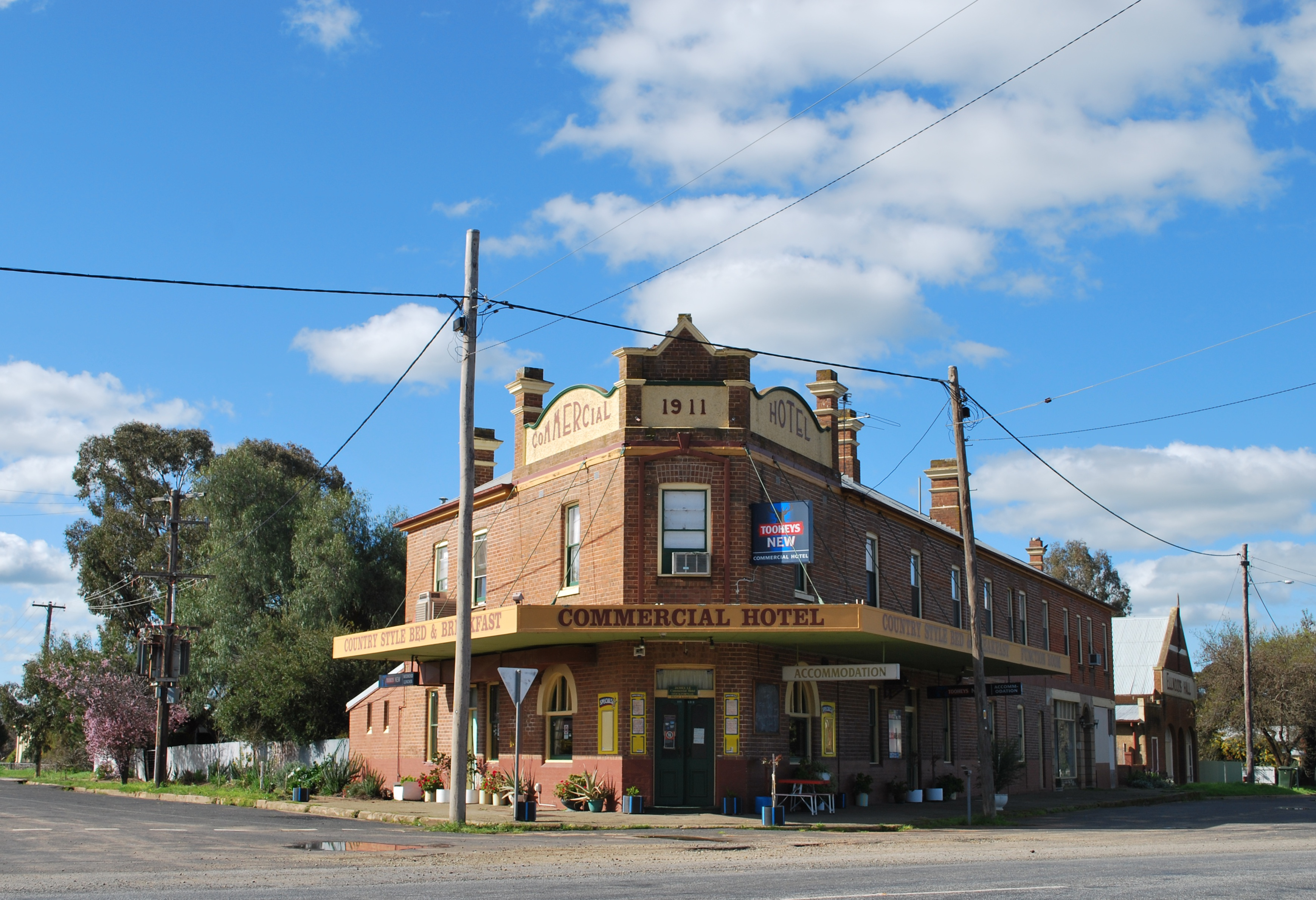
Commercial Hotel, Stockinbingal, 2010

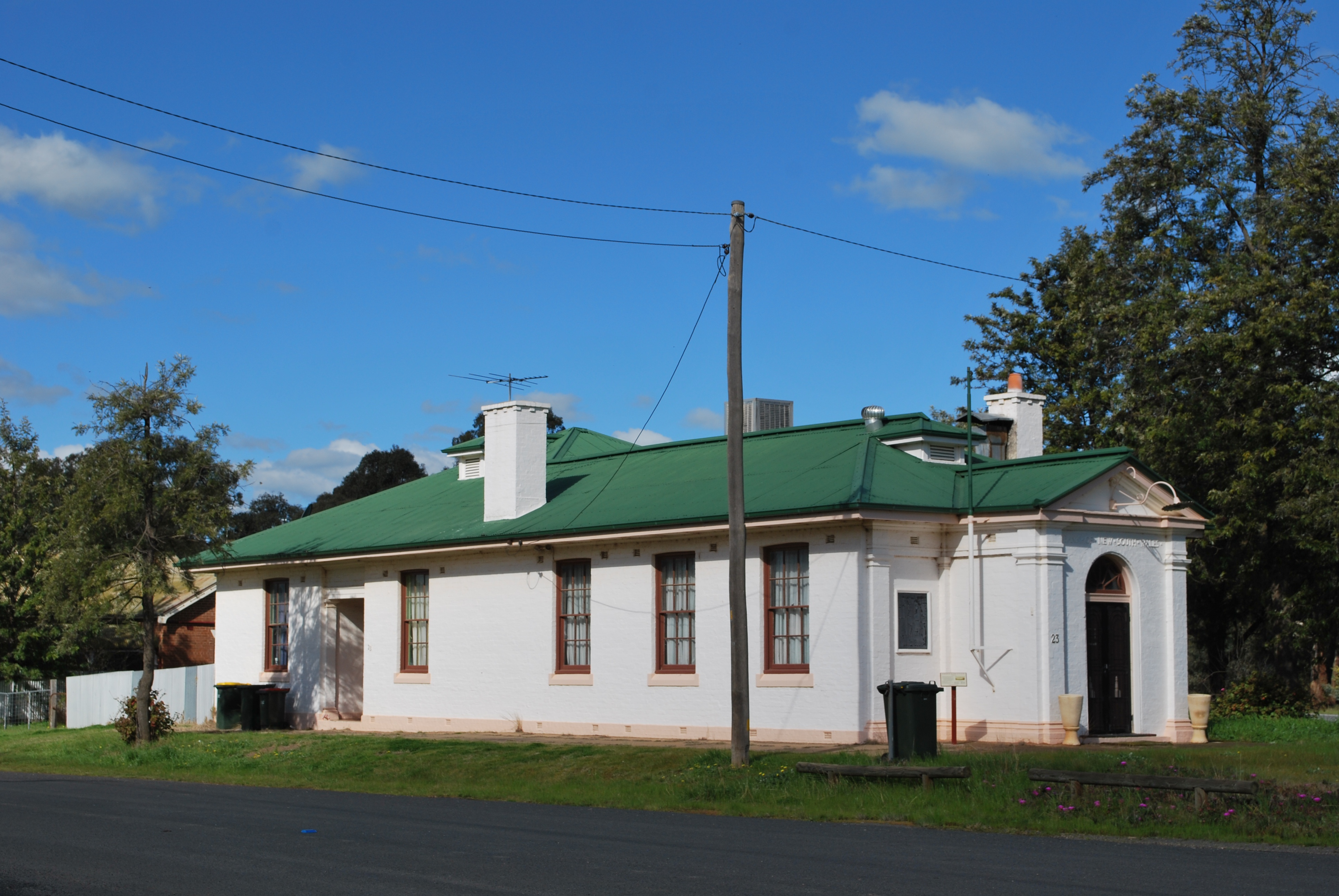
Former Bank of New South Wales, 2010

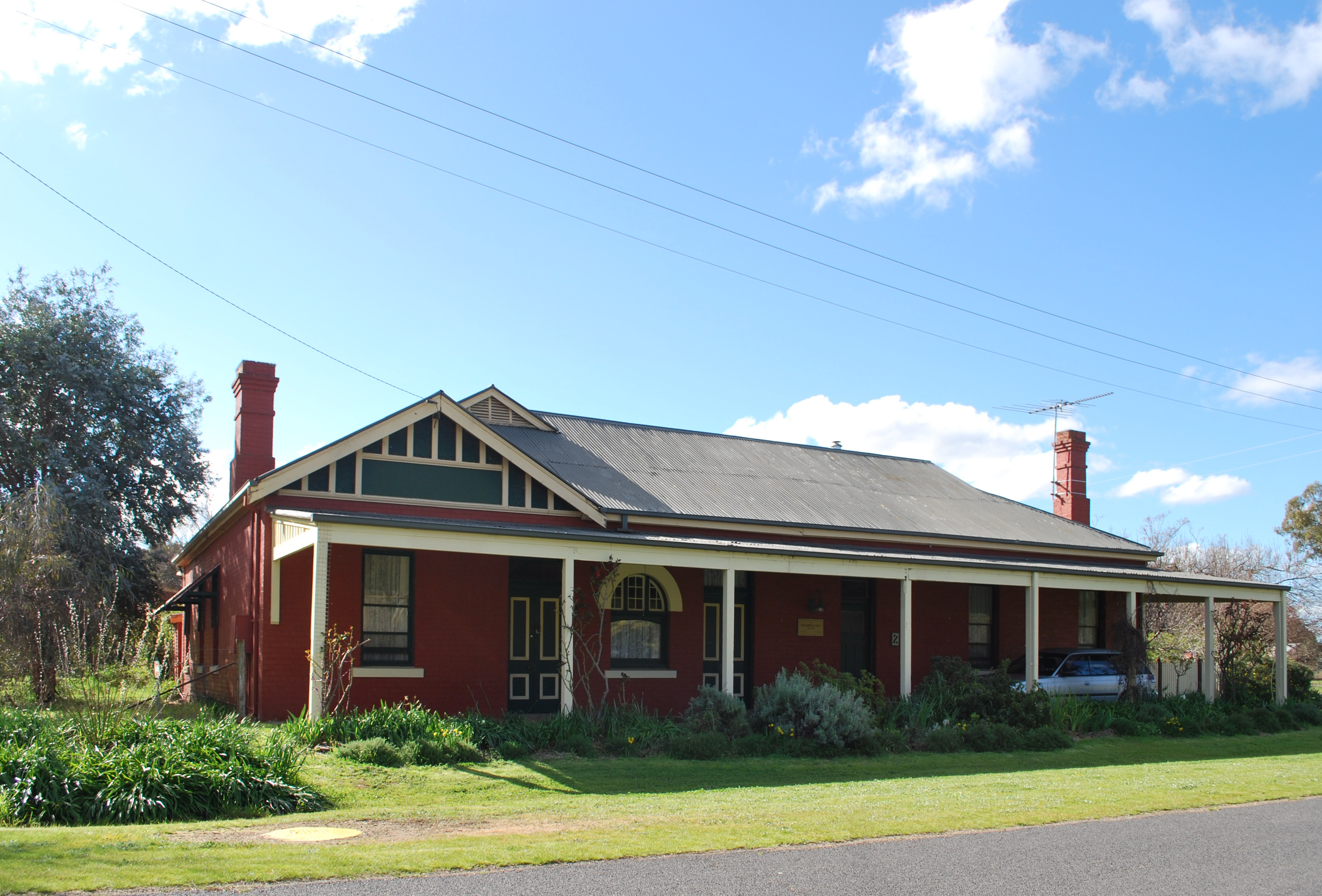
Former Stockinbingal Hotel, 2010

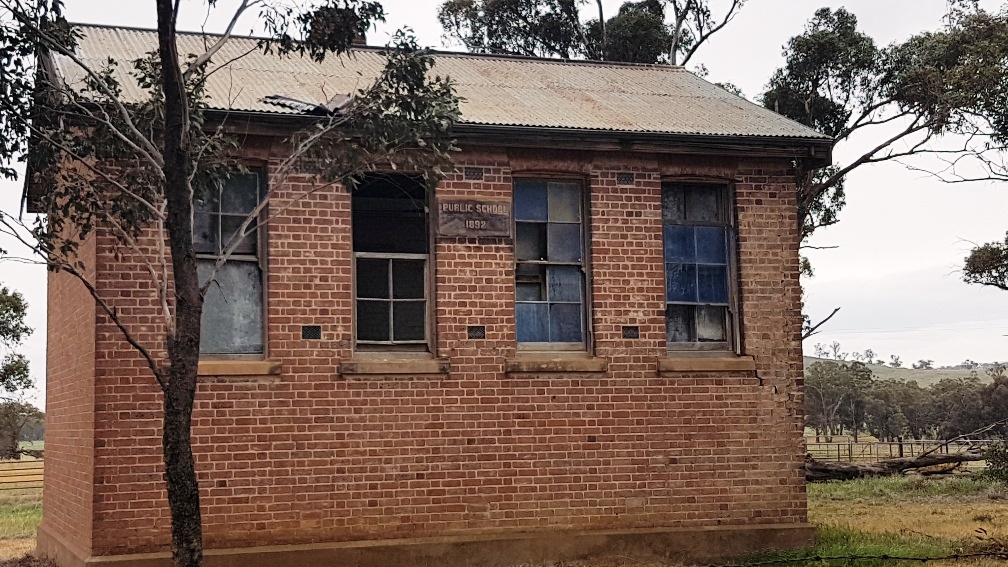
Old schoolhouse in Yeo Yeo district, now a farm outbuilding, 2019
