= Lake Cargelligo railway line =

Railway line in New South Wales, Australia

Lake Cargelligo line
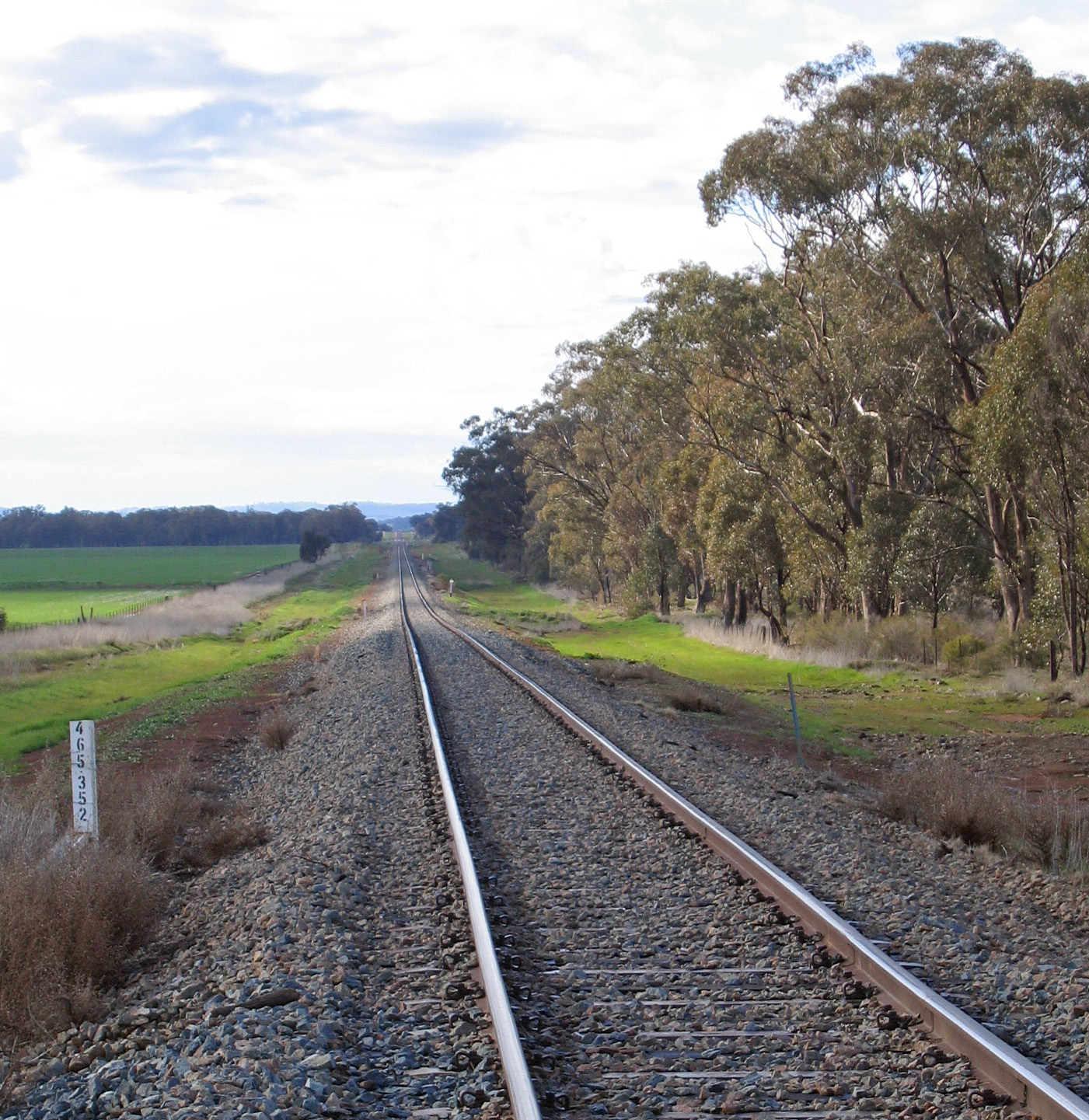
- Lake Cargelligo railway at near Temora

Overview
- Owner: Transport Asset Manager of New South Wales

Technical
- Track gauge: 1,435 mm (4 ft 8 1/2 in)

The Lake Cargelligo railway line is a railway line in Central Western New South Wales, Australia. The first sod was turned commencing construction on 8 June 1913 with the line opening on 13 November 1917. The line branches from the Main South line at Cootamundra and travels in a north-westerly direction to the small town of Lake Cargelligo. The line is used primarily for grain haulage, although passenger service was provided until 1983.

The section between Cootamundra and Stockinbingal forms part of the cross country line between the Main South and Broken Hill line, which allows goods trains to bypass Sydney.

In December 2007, flooding washed away several sections of track between Ungarie and Lake Cargelligo rendering the track unpassable. The rail line has since then been repaired between Ungarie and Lake Cargelligo rendering the track open.

The section of rail between Lake Cargelligo and Ungarie has been identified as needing upgrades so it can handle mainline locomotives and grain cars, for transporting local grain to port for export.

The section of rail is 100 years old, and needs new rails to be able to accommodate the mainline locomotives that deliver to the ports. Without a rail line, growers are forced to transport their grain by road.

== Early operations ==
From the opening of the line in 1913 daily passenger services were operated by mixed goods and passenger steam trains, the passenger carriages being 'dog box' configuration. It was not until 1938 after much complaint by passengers that more comfortable 'corridor' type passenger carriages were introduced on the branch line to Lake Cargelligo. In the same year after more agitation from residents serviced by this line the Railway Commissioners agreed to a new diesel rail motor service to operate between Temora (departing daily at 08:30am) and Lake Cargelligo, the new train commenced from late 1938 replacing the mixed steam trains that had operated since opening. Later CPH railmotors operated on this line until passenger services were ceased in 1983.

== Management ==
The line is owned by the Transport Asset Manager of New South Wales, however the section between Cootamundra and Stockinbingal is leased by the Australian Rail Track Corporation (ARTC) who are responsible for the maintenance and operation of the line. The ARTC is responsible for co-ordinating operations over the remainder of the line.

== Gallery ==
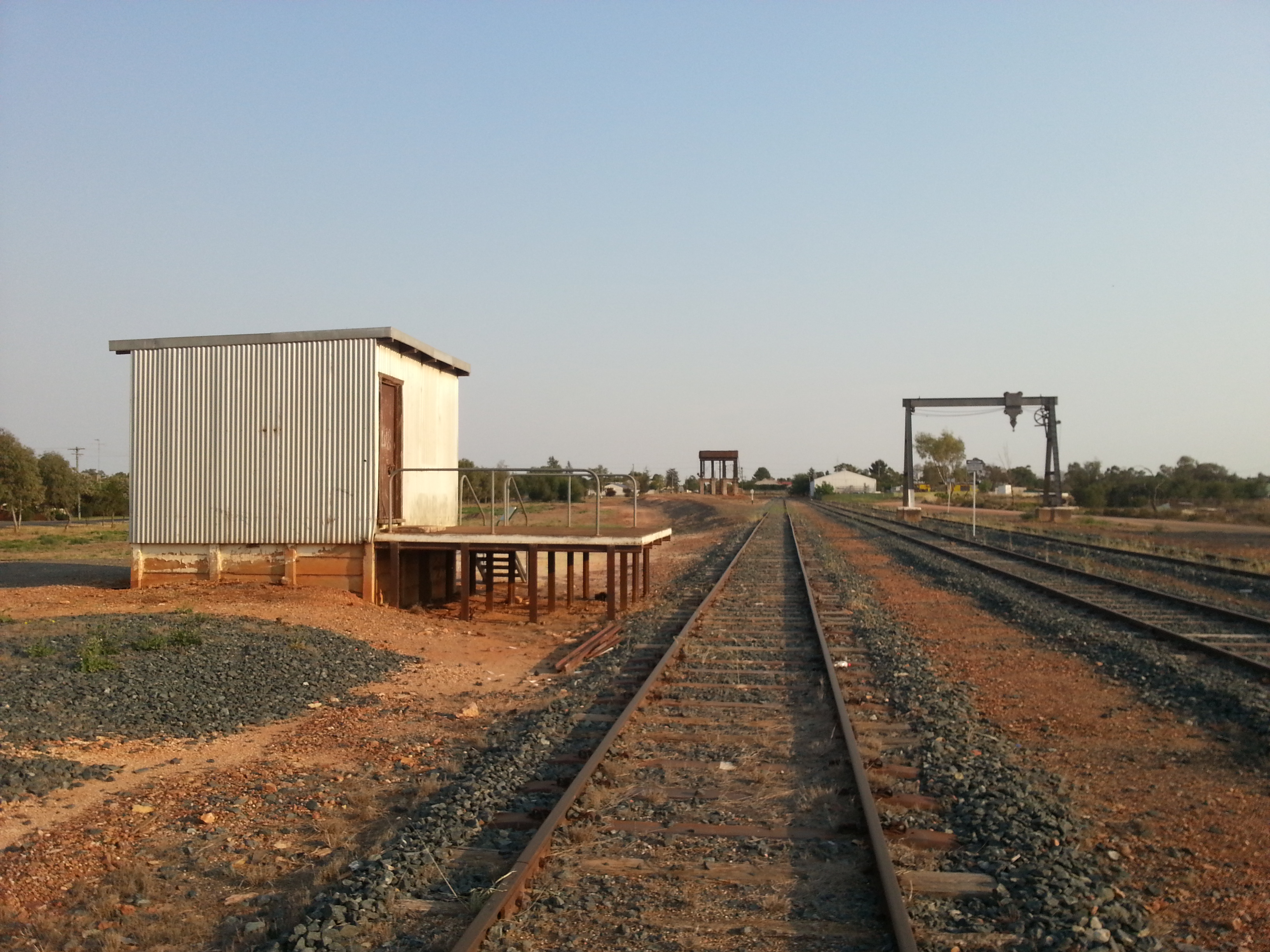
Lake Cargelligo – Signal Box & Gantry Crane

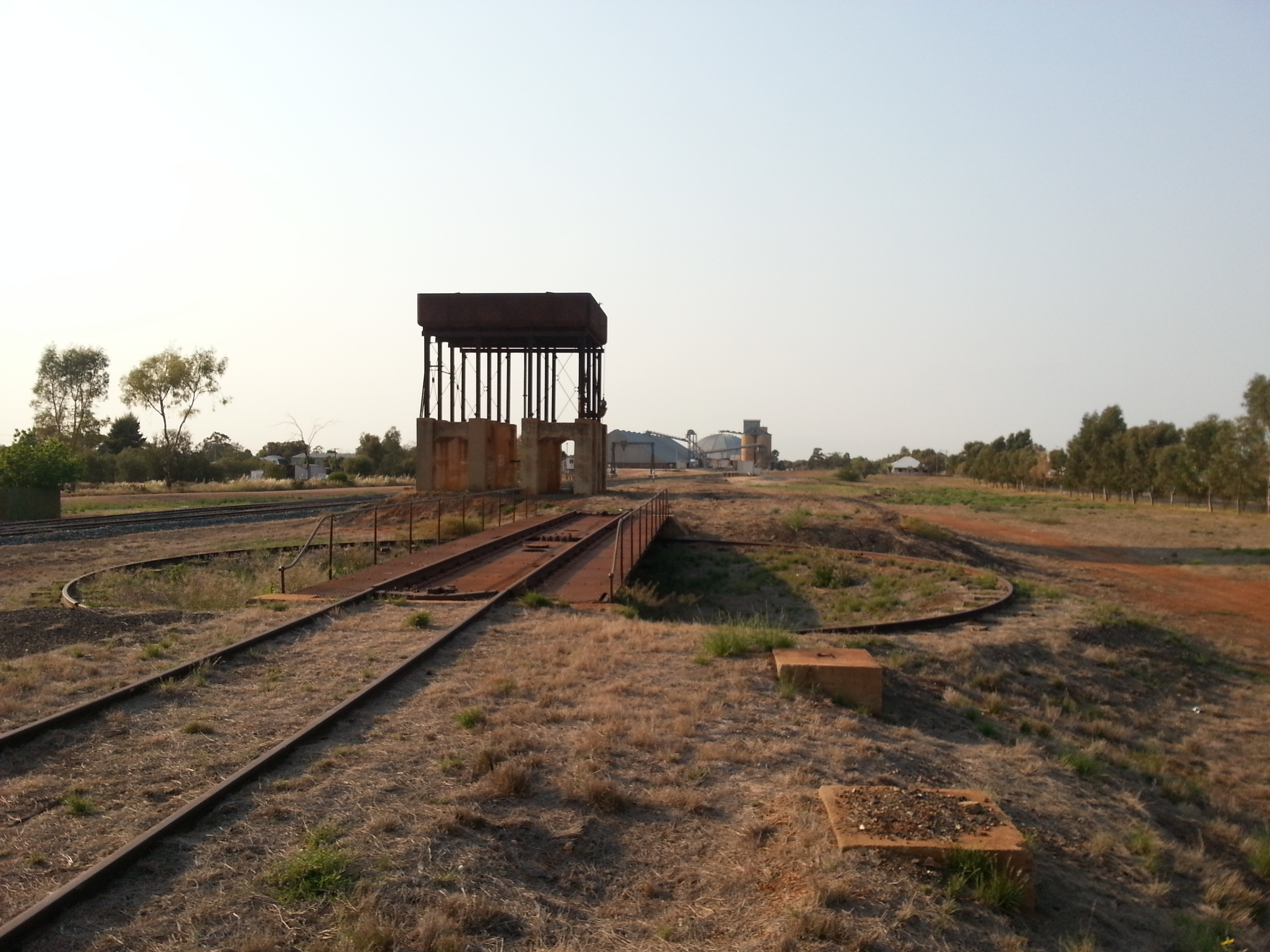
Lake Cargelligo Water Tower & Turntable

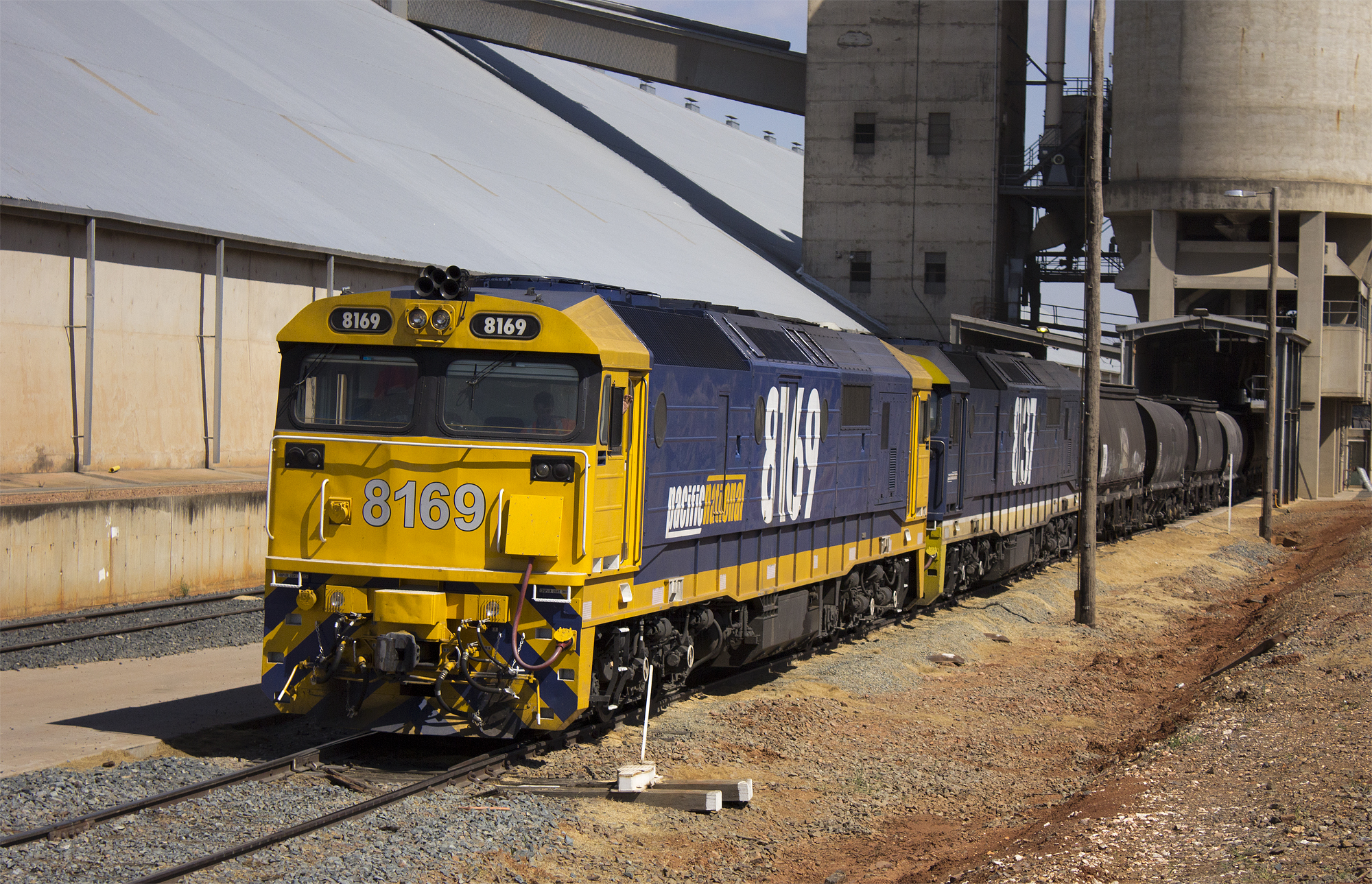
Pacific National 81 class locos at the Temora Sub Terminal]

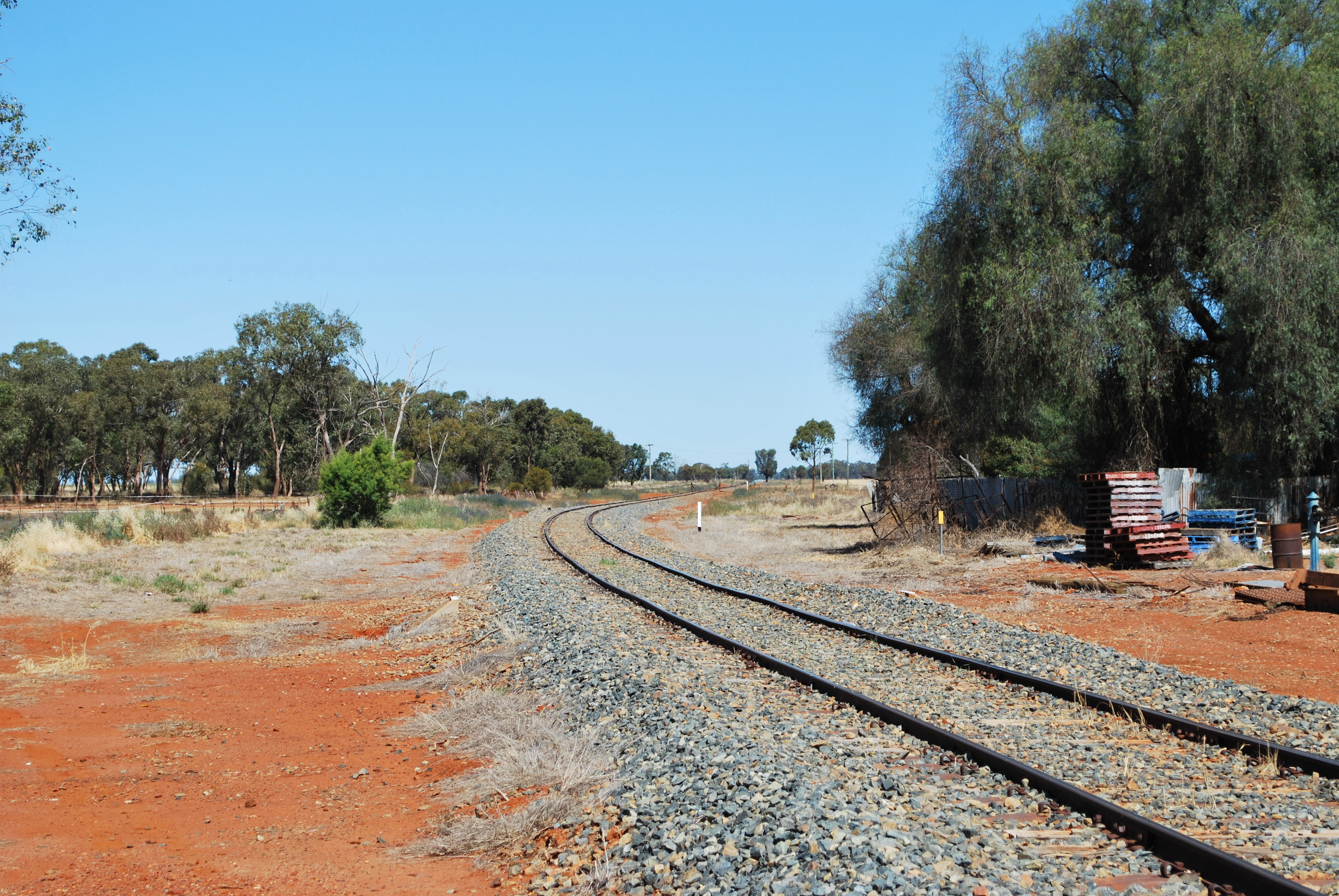
Near Tullibigeal

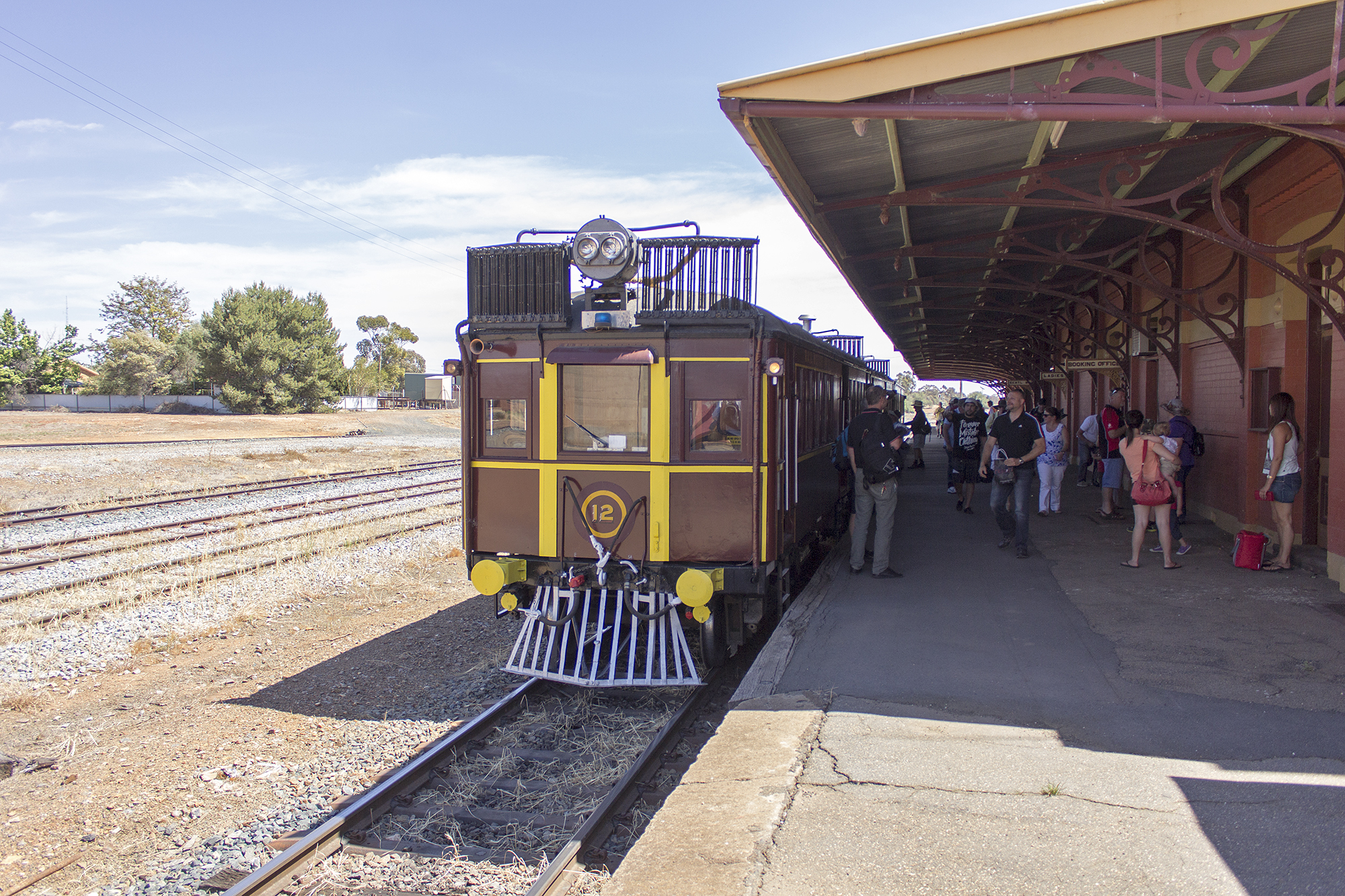
Temora Railway Station

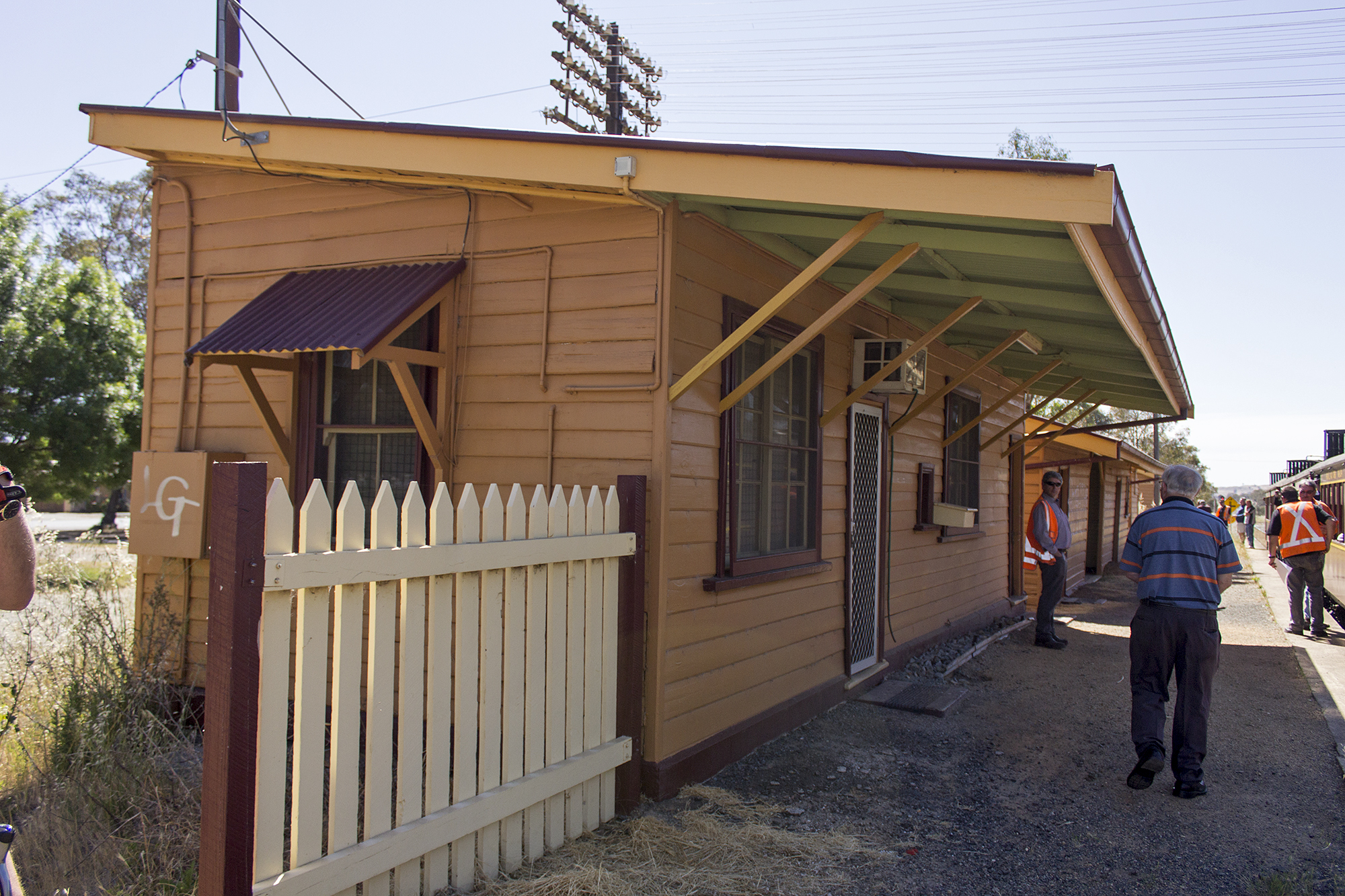
Stockinbingal railway station

== See also ==
- Rail transport in New South Wales
