= Stockinbingal–Parkes railway line =

Railway line in New South Wales, Australia

Stockinbingal–Parkes
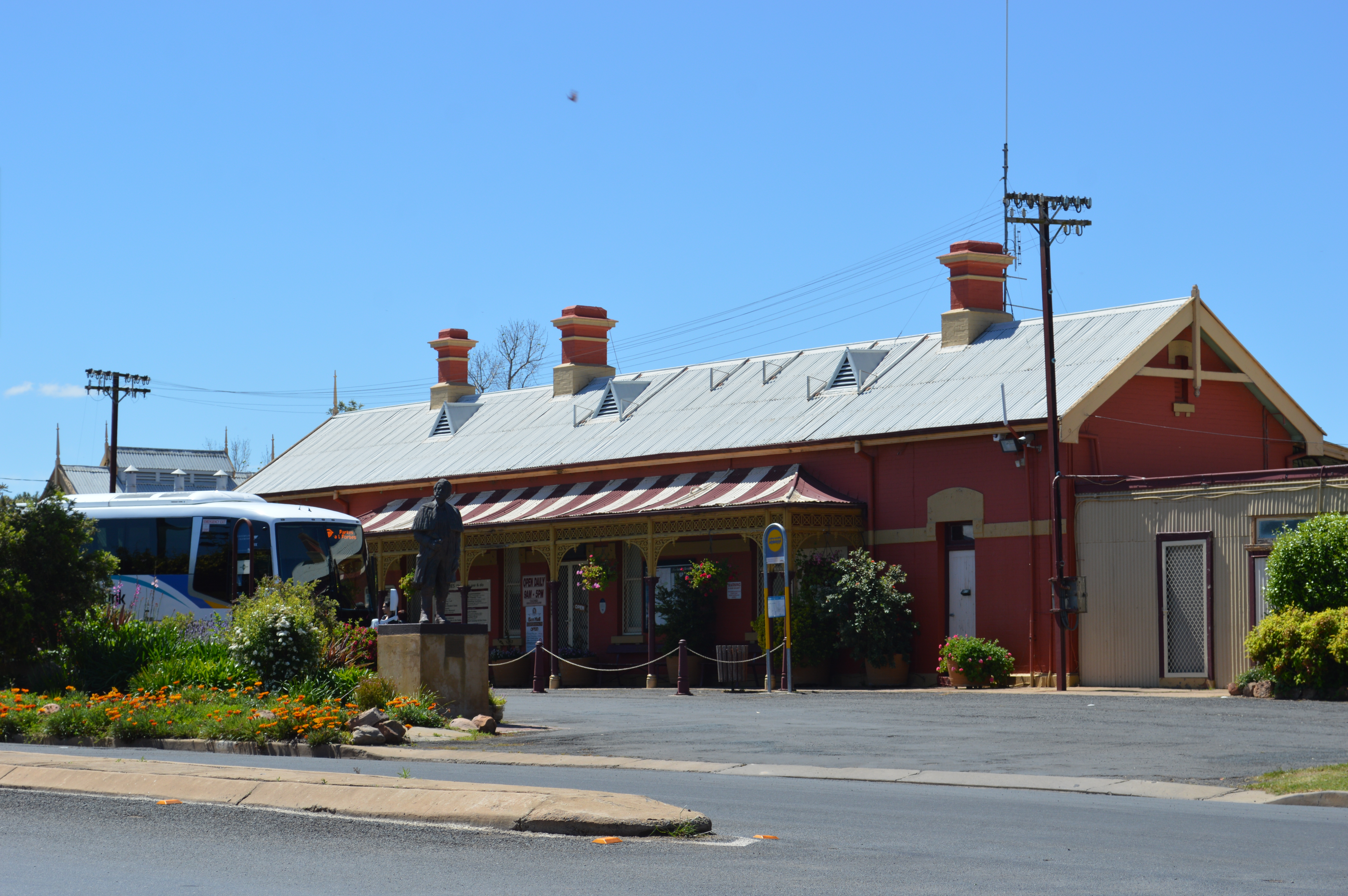
- Forbes station

Technical
- Track gauge: 1,435 mm (4 ft 8 1/2 in)

The Stockinbingal–Parkes railway line (also known as the 'Forbes line') is a railway line in New South Wales, Australia which connects Stockinbingal on the Main South line with Parkes on the Main West line. The line has come to be part of the main route for goods trains travelling between Sydney and the west of NSW and beyond, allowing trains to bypass the steep grades and passenger services on the Blue Mountains section of the Main West line.

Western goods trains were rescheduled to operate over this line in lieu of the Blue Mountains from 1993 when the now-defunct National Rail company commenced interstate freight haulage. The line opened between Parkes and Forbes in 1893, and Forbes and Stockinbingal in 1918. Passenger services were operated by CPH railmotors until their withdrawal between Stockinbingal and Forbes in October 1974. Services operated between Parkes and Forbes until 1983, consisting of a Mail train and a rail-motor service.

No regular passenger services use the line, although Main West line passenger services occasionally divert over the line when trackwork closes the regular route. The line is owned by the Transport Asset Holding Entity of New South Wales, but it is leased by the Australian Rail Track Corporation, which is responsible for the maintenance and operation of the line.

== See also ==
- Rail transport in New South Wales
