= Lake Cargelligo, New South Wales =

Lake Cargelligo
- Town
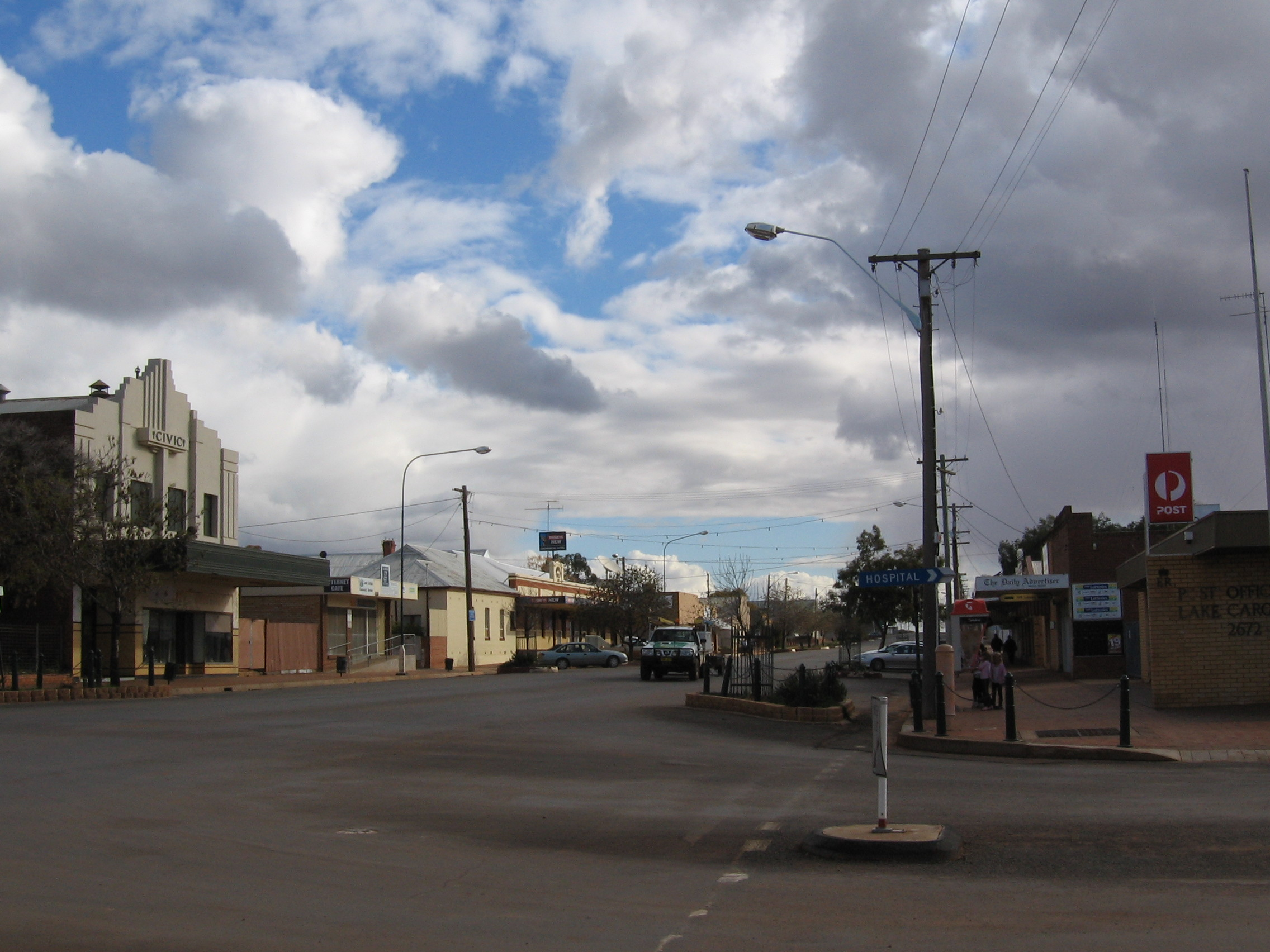
- Main street

- Coordinates: 33°17′54″S 146°22′26″E
- Country: Australia
- State: New South Wales
- LGA: Lachlan Shire
- Location: 564 km (350 mi) W of Sydney; 113 km (70 mi) N of Griffith; 93 km (58 mi) WSW of Condobolin; 91 km (57 mi) ENE of Hillston; 113 km (70 mi) NW of West Wyalong

Government
  - State electorate: Barwon
  - Federal division: Parkes
- Elevation: 168 m (551 ft)

Population
  - Total: 1,430 (2021 census)
- Postcode: 2672
- Mean max temp: 25.1 °C (77.2 °F)
- Mean min temp: 10.9 °C (51.6 °F)
- Annual rainfall: 426.5 mm (16.79 in)

Lake Cargelligo (/kɑːrˈdʒɛlɪɡoʊ/) is a town in the Central West region of New South Wales, Australia, on Lake Cargelligo. It is in Lachlan Shire. Its name is said to be a corruption of the Aboriginal word kartjellakoo meaning 'he had a coolamon'. Alternatively it is derived from Wiradjuri and Ngiyambaa "gajal" for water container with suffix "lugu" for "her" or "his". At the 2021 census, Lake Cargelligo had a population of 1,430. It had an Indigenous population of 257 (18%) and other Australian-born population of 1,153 (together 80.6% of the population).

== History ==
The area now known as Lake Cargelligo lies within the traditional lands of the Wiradjuri people.

The explorers, John Oxley and George Evans, followed the Lachlan River down to Lake Cargelligo in 1817. Lake Cargelligo was known as Cudgelligo (or sometimes Cudgellico) in the 1800s and was officially changed when the railway arrived in 1917.

After colonial settlement, the land was taken over by settlers and the local Aboriginal population was removed from their traditional country and consolidated at other locations, under the control of the Aboriginal Protection Board. In 1907, official records showed no Aboriginal people as living at 'Cudgellico Lake'. In 1949, a population of Wiradjuri, together with Ngiyampaa and Paakantyi people—from traditional lands west of the Wiradjuri lands—totalling 240 people was relocated from Menindee to a camp at Murrin Bridge about 15 km from Lake Cargelligo.

On 22 January 2026, a shooting spree occurred in the town. Three people were killed, including a pregnant woman, and another was critically injured. The suspect, Julian Ingram, fled the scene and has since been found dead by suicide on the 11th of May, 2026.

== Culture ==
Lake Cargelligo has a culture of watersports on the lake.

The town, along with nearby Tullibigeal has a rugby league team in the Group 20 Rugby League competition, nicknamed the Sharks.

Lake Cargelligo also has an Australian rules football team nicknamed the Tigers in the Northern Riverina Football League.

== Transport ==
The railway from Cootamundra to Wyalong was extended to Lake Cargelligo in 1917. The railway station opened as 'Cargelligo' in 1917 and was renamed 'Lake Cargelligo' in 1919. Rail-motor passenger services operated to the town until 1983. Since then the railway link has been used for cargo transport, especially for bulk grain which the surrounding farms cultivate. It also has a strong World War I background and ANZAC heritage.

== Mining ==
Rich mineral deposits are found in the area around the township. Mines include:

- Bevs Gossanous Mine
- Fosters Reef Gold Mine
- The Whitton Road Mine is an open cut magnesite mine.
- Allys Zone Mine
- Browns Reef Mine is an open cut and underground copper, lead, silver and zinc mine.
- Bevs Gossanous Zone Mine
- Billys Lead Zone Mine

== Solar Thermal Power Station ==
Lake Cargelligo is the site of the Lake Cargelligo Thermal Power Station, a concentrated Solar Thermal Power station.

The plant uses dual axes sun tracking mirrors (heliostats) to reflect solar energy onto central towers to heat up multiple graphite solar storage receivers. The heat is then used to generate electricity via a 3MWe steam turbine generator, related steam cycle plant and controls.

The 620 heliostats have a combined reflective surface area of 6 080 m².

The plant was constructed using a grant from the Australian Government's Advanced Electricity Storage Technologies (AEST) Program. The plant commenced operation in May 2011. More details on the project can be obtained from the Final Public Report – Commonwealth of Australia Department of Resource, Energy and Tourism, August 2011.

By 2014, the operator had accumulated more than 25,000 hours of operating data from the solar power plant.

In 2016, the owner announced plans to dismantle the Lake Cargelligo site for redevelopment. The new site will be used for research and development as well as for demonstration purposes. Construction of the new site is set to begin early 2017.

== The lake ==
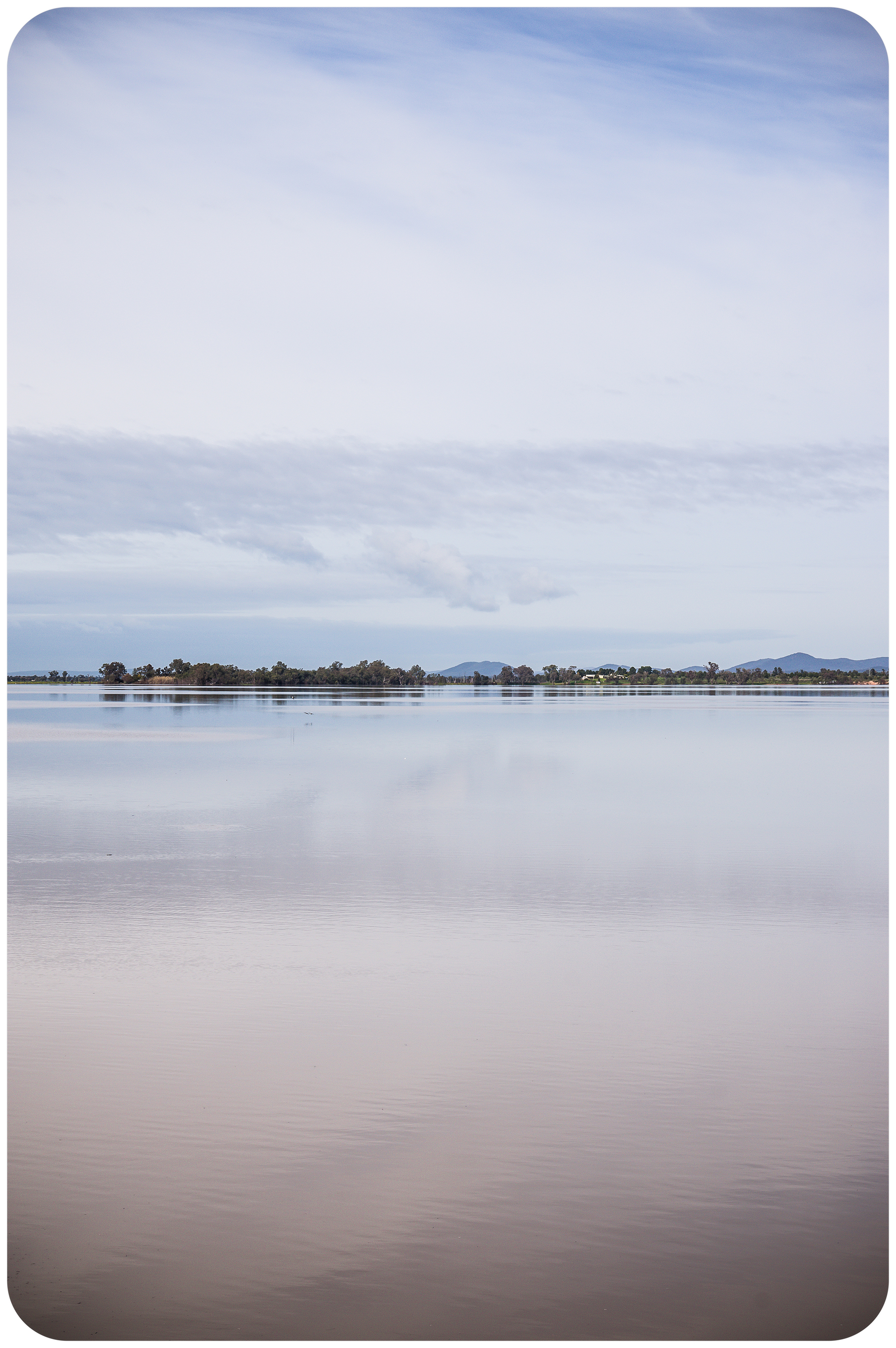
Lake Cargelligo

As its name would suggest, the town of Lake Cargelligo is situated on a lake fed by the Lachlan River through Lake Curlew. The lake was originally named Regent's Lake by the explorer John Oxley after the prince regent of England at the time. The lake was the primary water source for the early mining town, and has continued to remain an integral source of water for Lake Cargelligo's inhabitants and for all users along the lower Lachlan. These days the lake serves recreational uses as well, bird watchers are by far the largest group of visitors to the lake and surrounds due to the incredible diversity of waterfowl and other rare birds in the district. Boating, fishing and water skiing, also contribute to the town's tourism industry.

While the lake was natural, it was not permanent. Earthworks were constructed in the late 19th century and using horse and scoop, to build a levee bank and deepen sections of the lake, so that it would become more permanent. After many years of drought, it was reported in early 2010 that the lake ran dry for the first time since 1902.

== Climate ==
The area features a borderline hot semi-arid / cold semi-arid climate (BSh / BSk), with very hot summers and cool winters, and low rainfall throughout the year with a substantial range in temperature. The town is considerably sunny with 128.3 clear days annually.

Climate data for Lake Cargelligo Airport (1907–2023, rainfall 1881–2024); 169 m AMSL; 33.28 °S, 146.37 °E
Month	Jan	Feb	Mar	Apr	May	Jun	Jul	Aug	Sep	Oct	Nov	Dec	Year
Record high °C (°F)	47.7 (117.9)	46.8 (116.2)	41.5 (106.7)	36.2 (97.2)	30.6 (87.1)	26.4 (79.5)	27.2 (81.0)	30.6 (87.1)	37.1 (98.8)	39.1 (102.4)	43.9 (111.0)	45.4 (113.7)	47.7 (117.9)
Mean daily maximum °C (°F)	34.2 (93.6)	33.4 (92.1)	30.2 (86.4)	25.2 (77.4)	20.1 (68.2)	16.1 (61.0)	15.5 (59.9)	17.5 (63.5)	21.5 (70.7)	25.5 (77.9)	29.4 (84.9)	32.4 (90.3)	25.1 (77.2)
Mean daily minimum °C (°F)	18.6 (65.5)	18.3 (64.9)	15.3 (59.5)	10.8 (51.4)	7.1 (44.8)	4.6 (40.3)	3.4 (38.1)	4.6 (40.3)	7.1 (44.8)	10.6 (51.1)	14.2 (57.6)	16.8 (62.2)	10.9 (51.7)
Record low °C (°F)	7.8 (46.0)	8.0 (46.4)	6.7 (44.1)	0.6 (33.1)	−3.3 (26.1)	−2.8 (27.0)	−6.1 (21.0)	−6.1 (21.0)	−1.7 (28.9)	1.5 (34.7)	3.8 (38.8)	3.9 (39.0)	−6.1 (21.0)
Average precipitation mm (inches)	41.4 (1.63)	34.9 (1.37)	37.2 (1.46)	30.5 (1.20)	36.4 (1.43)	37.4 (1.47)	33.1 (1.30)	33.0 (1.30)	31.9 (1.26)	39.8 (1.57)	33.9 (1.33)	36.7 (1.44)	426.5 (16.79)
Average precipitation days (≥ 0.2 mm)	3.8	3.5	3.7	3.9	5.6	6.9	7.0	6.9	5.6	5.5	4.3	4.2	60.9
Average afternoon relative humidity (%)	31	36	36	40	49	60	59	54	45	38	34	31	43
Source: Bureau of Meteorology

== Gallery ==
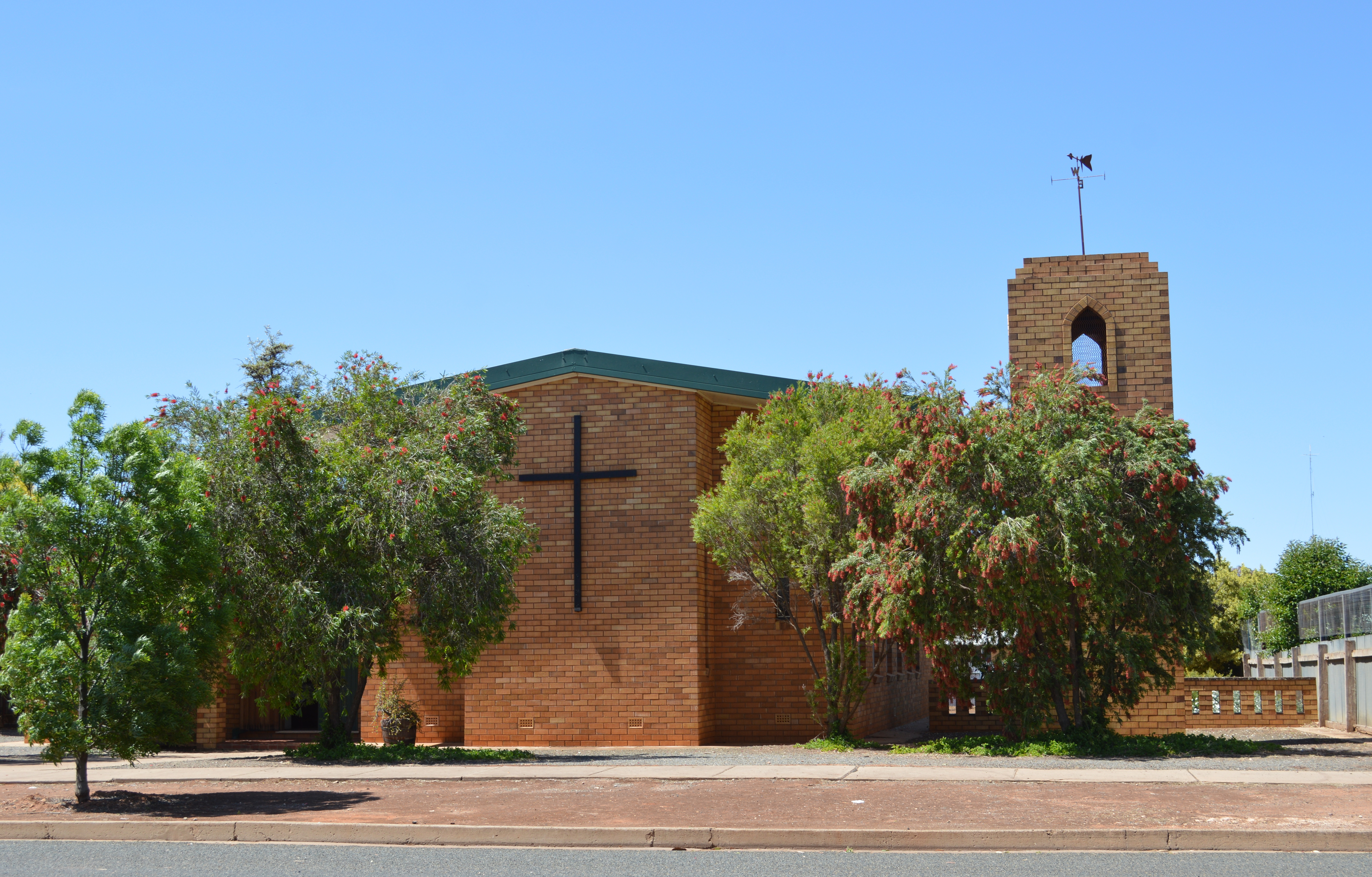
Lake Cargelligo Anglican Church

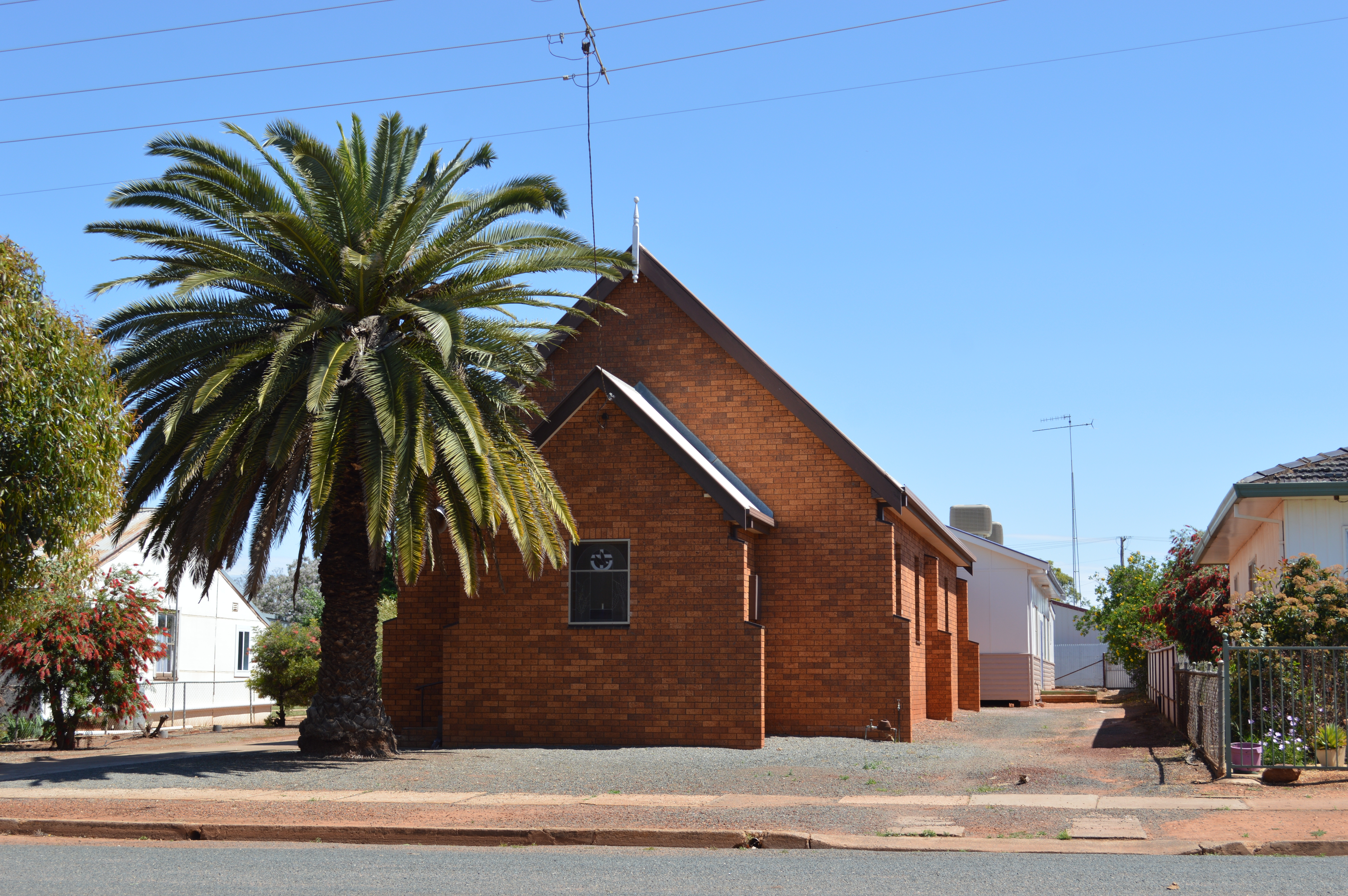
Lake Cargelligo Uniting Church

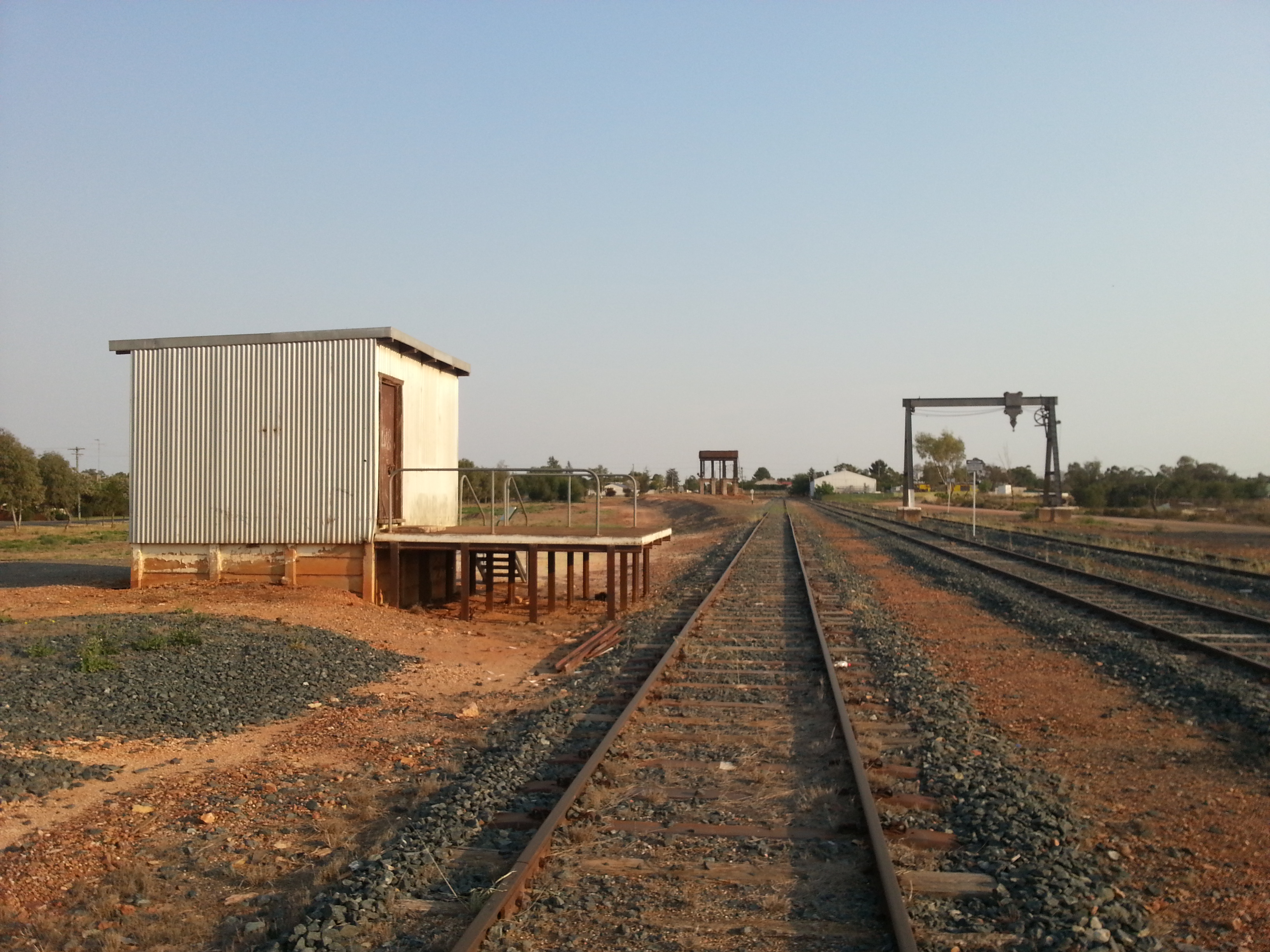
Lake Cargelligo – signal box and gantry crane

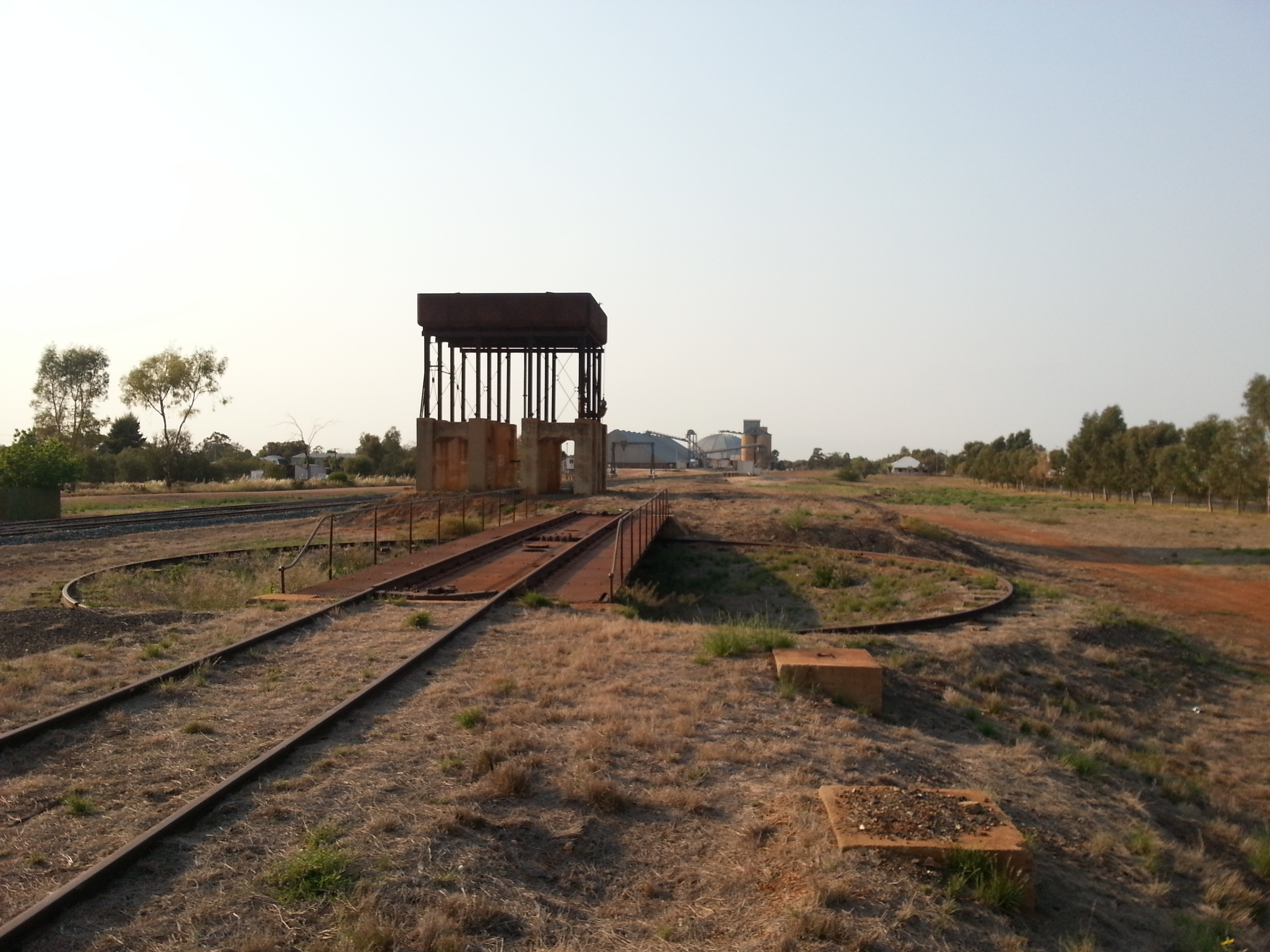
Lake Cargelligo water tower and turntable

== Notable residents ==
- Alexander Huie, journalist
- Malcolm Kelly, former professional rugby league player
- Chris Marland, former professional rugby league player
- Billy Phillips, current professional rugby league player for the Penrith Panthers
- Zac Saddler, former professional rugby league player
- Jason Wells, former professional rugby league player
