= Young Shire =

Former local government area in New South Wales, Australia

- Local government area
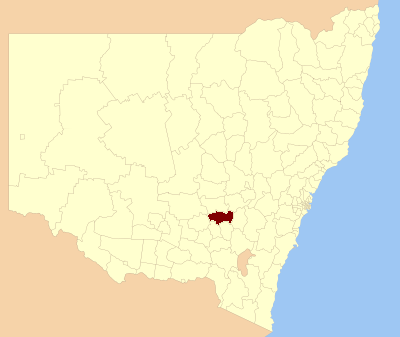
- Location in New South Wales
- Coordinates: 34°17′S 148°19′E
- Country: Australia
- State: New South Wales
- Region: South West Slopes
- Established: 1 July 1980
- Abolished: 12 May 2016
- Council seat: Young

Government
  - Mayor: Brian Ingram (Independent)
  - State electorate: Cootamundra
  - Federal division: Hume

Area
  - Total: 2,694 km^{2} (1,040 sq mi)

Population
  - Total: 12,236 (2011 census)
  - Density: 4.5419/km^{2} (11.7636/sq mi)
- Website: Young Shire
LGAs around Young Shire
Weddin	Weddin	Cowra
Bland	Young Shire	Boorowa
Temora	Cootamundra	Harden

Young Shire was a local government area in the South West Slopes region of New South Wales, Australia. The Shire was located adjacent to the Olympic Highway.

Young Shire was created on 1 July 1980 from the amalgamation of the Municipality of Young with the surrounding Burrangong Shire.

The Shire included the town of Young and the small towns of Maimuru, Milvale, Thuddungra, Bribbaree, Monteagle, Wirrimah, Bendick Murrell, Koorawatha and Murringo.

In 2016, Young Shire was amalgamated into Hilltops Council. The last mayor of Young Shire Council was Brian Ingram, an independent politician.

== Council ==
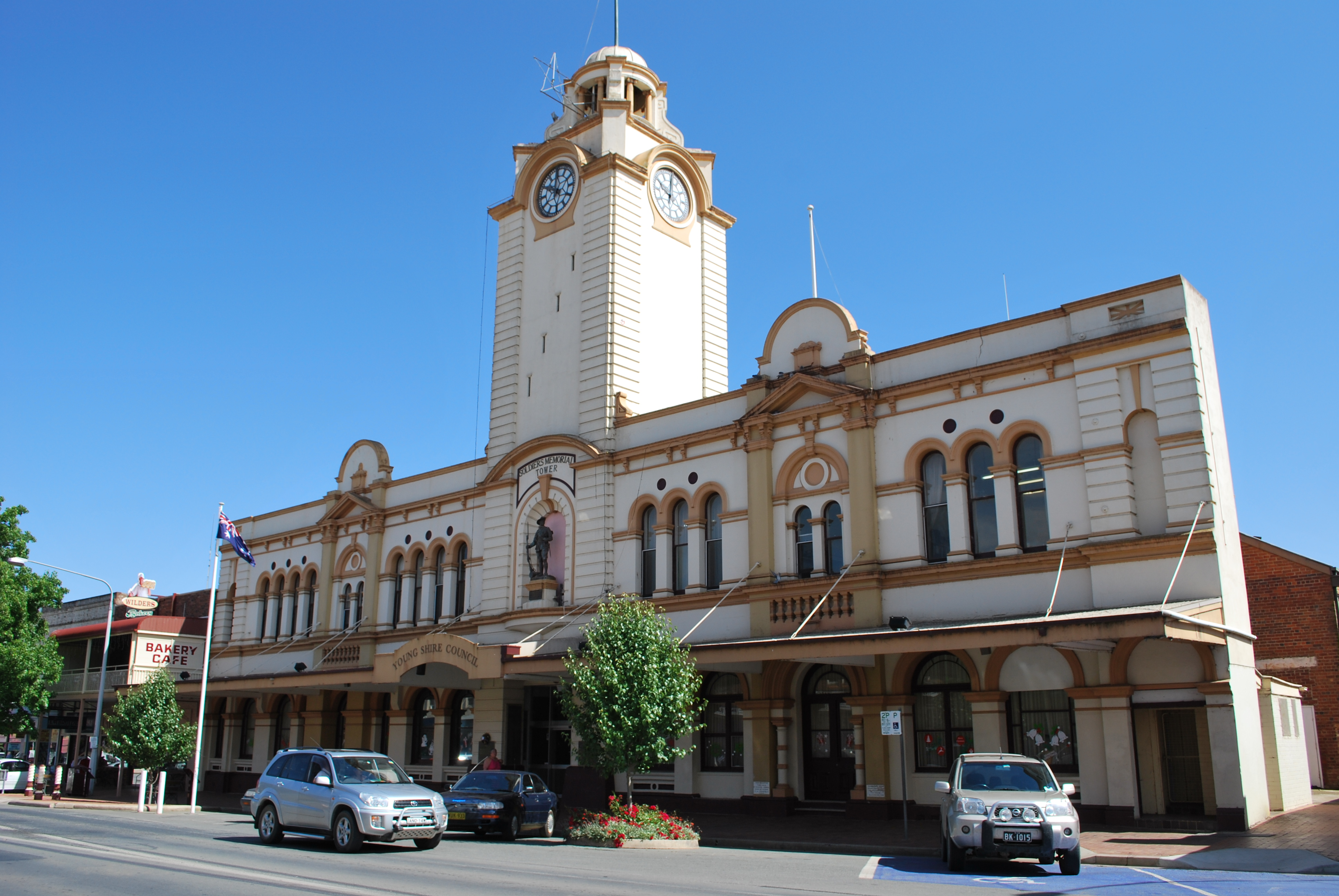
Young Shire Hall, Young.

=== Composition and election method ===
At the time of dissolution, Young Shire Council was composed of nine councillors elected proportionally as one entire ward. All councillors were elected for a fixed four-year term of office. The mayor was elected by the councillors at the first meeting of the council. The last election was held on 8 September 2012, and the makeup of the council was as follows:

Party	Councillors
Independents and Unaligned	8
Total	8

The final Council, elected in 2012, in order of election, was:

Councillor	Party	Notes
Ben Cooper	Independent	Deputy Mayor
John McGregor	Unaligned	Deceased
John Walker	Unaligned	
Brian Mullany	Independent	
Tony Wallace	Unaligned	
Brian Ingram	Independent	Mayor
Sandy Freudenstein	Unaligned	
Allan Miller	Independent	

== Previous mayors and deputy mayors ==
=== Young Shire 1980-2016 ===
Term	Mayor	Deputy mayor	Notes
2012–2016	Brian Ingram	Ben Cooper	
2012–2016	John Walker	Ben Cooper	
2008–2012	Stuart Freudenstein		
2004–2008	Gerry Bailey	John McGregor	
1999–2003	John Walker	John McGregor	
1995–1999	A.M. (Tony) Hewson	Gerry Bailey	
1992–1996			
1988–1992			
1984–1988			
1980–1984			

=== Municipality of Young 1882-1980 ===
Term	Mayor	Notes
1980		
1979		
1978		
1977	J. W. Burrows	
1972–1976	R. B. Favero	
1966–1972	E. G. Smith	
1960–1966	W. R. Tate	
1957–1959	R. L. Howard	
1952–1957	G. S. Smith	
1950–1951	R. N. Blackett	
1949–1950	N. F. Batley	
1948	C. M. Western	
1945–1947	J. J. Paterson	
1944	C. M. Western	
1943	J. J. Paterson	
1942	C. M. Western	
1941	Dr A. M. Purchas	
1938–1940	A. J. Rabbetts	
1936–1937	C. M. Western	
1934–1935	A. J. Rabbetts	
1932–1933	C. G. Prescott	
1931	H. F. Lazzarini	
1930	C. G. Prescott	
1928–1929	John "Jack" McLennan	
1927	James Rintoul	
1925–1926	T. F. Tresilian	
1922–1924	A. J. Rabbetts	
1921	W. F. Weedon	
1918–1920	A. J. Rabbetts	
1917	James Rintoul	
1916	A. J. Rabbetts	
1913–1915	L. R. Tierney	
1911–1912	G. S. Whiteman	
1910	L. R. Tierney	
1909	James Rintoul	
1908 (part)	W. M. Ehrlich	
1908 (part)	G. S. Whiteman	In 1908 Ald. Whiteman resigned in October from the chair; and Ald. Ehrlich was elected for the remainder of the term.
1907	W. J. Hills	
1906	John Learmont	
1903–1905	G. S. Whiteman	
1902	Donald Mackenzie	
1902	G. S. Whiteman	
1900–1901	L. L. Hogan	
1899	James Gordon	
1895–1898	Donald Mackenzie	
1894	W. J. Hills	
1893	R. B. Armstrong	
1892	Edward Taylor	
1891	Dr John T. Heeley	
1890	C. Hourn	
1889	John Forsythe	
1888	George Arthur Cranfield	
1887	John Forsythe	
1886	John Rogan	
1884–1885	William Sharp	
1883	John W. Russell	
1882	Peter Cram	

=== Burrangong Shire 1906-1980 ===
Term	Shire President	Notes
1971-	J. P. Johnson	
1967–1971	Robert Henry Tout	
1955–1967	W. W. Sharrock	
1950–1955	Hector M. D. McFarlane	
1949–1950	Eric Campbell	
1948–1949	V. P. Bragg	
1945–1948	Richard H. Thackeray	
1940–1945	V. P. Bragg	
1937–1940	Charles Crichton	
1931–1937	H. G. M. Thacheray	
1926–1931	Sidney Taylor	
1917–1926	Charles Crichton	
1906–1917	William Browne	

== Amalgamation ==
A 2015 review of local government boundaries recommended that Boorowa Council merge with adjoining councils. The NSW Government considered two proposals. The first proposed a merger between the Young, Harden and Boorowa shires to form a new council with an area of 7,139 square kilometres (2,756 sq mi) and support a population of approximately 19,000. Following the lodging of an alternate proposal by Harden Shire on 28 February 2016 to amalgamate the Cootamundra, Gundagai and Harden shires, the NSW Minister for Local Government proposed a merger between the Boorowa and Young shires.

Young Shire was abolished on 12 May 2016 and along with Boorowa Council and Harden Shire, the area was included in a new Hilltops Council local government area.
