= Electoral results for the district of Cootamundra =

Election results for Cootamundra, New South Wales, Australia

Cootamundra, an electoral district of the Legislative Assembly in the Australian state of New South Wales, was created in 1904 and was abolished in 1941, returning one member until 1920, three members from 1920 to 1927 and one member from 1927 to 1941. It was recreated in 2015.

Election	Member	Party				
1904	William Holman	Labor				
1906 by	William Holman	Labor				
1907	William Holman	Labor				
1910	William Holman	Labor				
1913	William Holman	Labor				
1917	William Holman	Nationalist	Member	Party	Member	Party
1920	Greg McGirr	Labor	Peter Loughlin	Labor	Hugh Main	Progressive
1922	James McGirr	Labor	Peter Loughlin	Labor	Hugh Main	Progressive
1925	Ken Hoad	Labor	Peter Loughlin	Labor / Independent	Hugh Main	Country
1927	Ken Hoad	Labor				
1930	Ken Hoad	Labor				
1932	Bill Ross	Country				
1935	Bill Ross	Country				
1938	Bill Ross	Country				
Election	Member	Party				
2015	Katrina Hodgkinson	National				
2017 by	Steph Cooke	National				
2019	Steph Cooke	National				
2023	Steph Cooke	National				

== Election results ==
=== Elections in the 2020s ===
==== 2023 ====
2023 New South Wales state election: Cootamundra
Party	Candidate	Votes	%	±%
National	Steph Cooke	34,470	70.6	+9.4
Labor	Chris Dahlitz	6,566	13.4	−2.3
Shooters, Fishers, Farmers	Jake Cullen	4,209	8.6	−7.0
Greens	Jeffrey Passlow	1,198	2.5	−0.4
Independent	Robert Young	1,113	2.3	+2.3
Independent	Brian Fisher	674	1.4	+1.4
Sustainable Australia	Chris O'Rourke	618	1.3	−0.1
Total formal votes		48,848	97.7	+0.4
Informal votes		1,143	2.3	−0.4
Turnout		49,991	89.2	−2.9
Two-party-preferred result
National	Steph Cooke	36,446	82.1	+5.5
Labor	Chris Dahlitz	7,959	17.9	−5.5
National hold		Swing	+5.5	

=== Elections in the 2010s ===
==== 2019 ====
2019 New South Wales state election: Cootamundra
Party	Candidate	Votes	%	±%
National	Steph Cooke	30,206	63.66	−2.24
Shooters, Fishers, Farmers	Matthew Stadtmiller	7,447	15.70	+15.70
Labor	Mark Douglass	7,302	15.39	−10.59
Greens	Jeffrey Passlow	1,380	2.91	−0.57
Sustainable Australia	Joseph Costello	660	1.39	+1.39
Australia First	Jim Saleam	453	0.95	+0.95
Total formal votes		47,448	97.30	−0.01
Informal votes		1,319	2.70	+0.01
Turnout		48,767	91.20	−0.63
Two-party-preferred result
National	Steph Cooke	32,504	77.07	+6.65
Labor	Mark Douglass	9,673	22.93	−6.65
National hold		Swing	+6.65	

==== 2017 by-election ====
2017 Cootamundra by-election Saturday 14 October
Party	Candidate	Votes	%	±%
National	Steph Cooke	21,093	46.2	−19.6
Labor	Charlie Sheahan	10,930	24.0	−2.0
Shooters, Fishers, Farmers	Matthew Stadtmiller	10,621	23.3	+23.3
Christian Democrats	Philip Langfield	1,273	2.8	+0.5
Greens	Jeffrey Passlow	1,238	2.7	−0.8
Ind. Australia First	Jim Saleam	453	1.0	+1.0
Total formal votes		45,608	97.7	+0.4
Informal votes		1,057	2.3	−0.4
Turnout		46,665	87.2	−4.7
Two-party-preferred result
National	Steph Cooke	24,114	60.5	−10.0
Labor	Charlie Sheahan	15,769	39.5	+10.0
National hold		Swing	−10.0	

Katrina Hodgkinson (National) resigned.

==== 2015 ====
2015 New South Wales state election: Cootamundra
Party	Candidate	Votes	%	±%
National	Katrina Hodgkinson	31,080	65.9	−8.8
Labor	Charlie Sheahan	12,253	26.0	+9.3
Greens	Rod Therkelsen	1,642	3.5	−1.9
No Land Tax	Elio Cacciotti	1,118	2.4	+2.4
Christian Democrats	Philip Langfield	1,072	2.3	−0.9
Total formal votes		47,165	97.3	+0.1
Informal votes		1,305	2.7	−0.1
Turnout		48,470	91.8	+1.3
Two-party-preferred result
National	Katrina Hodgkinson	31,896	70.4	−9.9
Labor	Charlie Sheahan	13,400	29.6	+9.9
National notional hold		Swing	−9.9	

Cootamundra was a new seat combining most of the abolished district of Burrinjuck with the eastern part of the abolished district of Murrumbidgee. Katrina Hodgkinson (National) was the member for Burrinjuck and the member for Murrumbidgee, Adrian Piccoli (National) successfully contested Murray.

District recreated

==== 1941 - 2015 ====
District abolished

=== Elections in the 1930s ===
==== 1938 ====
1938 New South Wales state election: Cootamundra
Party	Candidate	Votes	%	±%
Country	Bill Ross	6,698	51.2	−1.5
Labor	Ken Hoad	6,382	48.8	+1.5
Total formal votes		13,080	98.5	0.0
Informal votes		205	1.5	0.0
Turnout		13,285	96.5	−1.3
Country hold		Swing	−1.5	

==== 1935 ====
1935 New South Wales state election: Cootamundra
Party	Candidate	Votes	%	±%
Country	Bill Ross	6,863	52.7	+2.4
Labor (NSW)	Ken Hoad	6,167	47.3	+3.7
Total formal votes		13,030	98.5	−0.6
Informal votes		195	1.5	+0.6
Turnout		13,225	97.8	+0.5
Country hold		Swing	N/A	

==== 1932 ====
1932 New South Wales state election: Cootamundra
Party	Candidate	Votes	%	±%
Country	Bill Ross	6,312	50.3	+9.5
Labor (NSW)	Ken Hoad	5,471	43.6	−14.9
Federal Labor	Thomas Lavelle	765	6.1	+6.1
Total formal votes		12,548	99.1	+0.8
Informal votes		112	0.9	−0.8
Turnout		12,660	97.3	+0.4
Country gain from Labor (NSW)		Swing	N/A	

- Preferences were not distributed.

==== 1930 ====
1930 New South Wales state election: Cootamundra
Party	Candidate	Votes	%	±%
Labor	Ken Hoad	6,981	58.5	
Country	Bill Ross	4,866	40.8	
Communist	William Beverley	84	0.7	
Total formal votes		11,931	98.3	
Informal votes		209	1.7	
Turnout		12,140	96.9	
Labor hold		Swing		

=== Elections in the 1920s ===
==== 1927 ====
1927 New South Wales state election: Cootamundra
Party	Candidate	Votes	%	±%
Labor	Ken Hoad	6,293	50.3	
Country	Thomas Fitzpatrick	6,207	49.7	
Total formal votes		12,500	99.0	
Informal votes		129	1.0	
Turnout		12,629	85.0	
Labor win		(new seat)		

==== 1925 ====
1925 New South Wales state election: Cootamundra
Party	Candidate	Votes	%	±%
Quota		7,114		
Labor	Peter Loughlin (elected 1)	8,033	28.2	+5.6
Labor	Ken Hoad (elected 3)	4,157	14.6	+7.0
Labor	Joseph Carney	2,935	10.3	+10.3
Progressive	Hugh Main (elected 2)	5,005	17.6	−3.9
Progressive	Ernest Field	1,435	5.0	+5.0
Progressive	Benjamin Witenden	424	1.5	+1.5
Progressive	Eric Treatt	213	0.7	+0.7
Nationalist	Angus Campbell	3,789	13.3	+1.0
Nationalist	Ernest Todhunter	895	3.1	+3.1
Nationalist	William Pinkstone	603	2.1	+2.1
Protestant Labour	George Davey	966	3.4	+3.4
Total formal votes		28,455	96.9	+0.5
Informal votes		918	3.1	−0.5
Turnout		29,373	71.2	+0.6
Party total votes
Labor		15,125	53.2	+2.9
Progressive		7,077	24.9	−9.3
Nationalist		5,287	18.6	+3.7
Protestant Labour		966	3.4	+3.4

==== 1922 ====
1922 New South Wales state election: Cootamundra
Party	Candidate	Votes	%	±%
Labor	Peter Loughlin (elected 1)	6,258	22.6	−3.1
Labor	James McGirr (elected 3)	5,577	20.1	−7.2
Labor	Ken Hoad	2,097	7.6	+7.6
Progressive	Hugh Main (elected 2)	5,966	21.5	+7.5
Progressive	Frederick Tout	2,455	8.9	+8.9
Progressive	Thomas Hough	1,056	3.8	+3.8
Nationalist	Arthur Manning	3,410	12.3	+12.3
Nationalist	Alfred Wilcox	448	1.6	+1.6
Nationalist	George O'Brien	268	1.0	+1.0
Independent	William Lucas	170	0.6	+0.6
Total formal votes		27,705	96.4	+1.3
Informal votes		1,027	3.6	−1.3
Turnout		28,732	70.6	+3.7
Party total votes
Labor		13,932	50.3	−4.4
Progressive		9,477	34.2	+6.3
Nationalist		4,126	14.9	−2.5
Independent	William Lucas	170	0.6	+0.6

==== 1920 ====
1920 New South Wales state election: Cootamundra
Party	Candidate	Votes	%	±%
Quota		6,325		
Labor	Greg McGirr (elected 1)	6,895	27.3	
Labor	Peter Loughlin (elected 2)	6,498	25.7	
Labor	Charles Trefle	452	1.8	
Progressive	Hugh Main (elected 3)	3,537	14.0	
Progressive	John Fitzpatrick	1,831	7.2	
Progressive	Hugh Brown	1,681	6.7	
Nationalist	William Holman (defeated)	4,199	16.6	
Nationalist	Arthur D'Arcy	204	0.8	
Total formal votes		25,297	95.1	
Informal votes		1,309	4.9	
Turnout		26,606	66.9	
Party total votes
Labor		13,845	54.7	
Progressive		7,049	27.9	
Nationalist		4,403	17.4	

=== Elections in the 1910s ===
==== 1917 ====
1917 New South Wales state election: Cootamundra
Party	Candidate	Votes	%	±%
Nationalist	William Holman	4,411	55.1	+55.1
Labor	Patrick Minahan	3,590	44.9	−9.8
Total formal votes		8,001	99.4	+0.2
Informal votes		51	0.6	−0.2
Turnout		8,052	70.3	−6.6
Member changed to Nationalist from Labor				

The sitting member William Holman was expelled from Labor in the November 1916 Labor split over conscription. Patrick Minahan was the sitting member for Belmore however he lost preselection for that seat.

==== 1913 ====
1913 New South Wales state election: Cootamundra
Party	Candidate	Votes	%	±%
Labor	William Holman	5,028	54.7	
Farmers and Settlers	Thomas Spring (Note: Also endorsed by Liberal Reform.)	4,157	45.3	
Total formal votes		9,185	99.2	
Informal votes		73	0.8	
Turnout		9,258	76.9	
Labor hold				

==== 1910 ====
1910 New South Wales state election: Cootamundra
Party	Candidate	Votes	%	±%
Labour	William Holman	3,551	51.7	
Liberal Reform	Granville Ryrie	3,316	48.3	
Total formal votes		6,867	99.1	
Informal votes		61	0.9	
Turnout		6,928	71.9	
Labour hold				

=== Elections in the 1900s ===
==== 1907 ====
1907 New South Wales state election: Cootamundra
Party	Candidate	Votes	%	±%
Labour	William Holman	3,005	52.4	
Independent Liberal	Alfred Conroy	2,730	47.6	
Total formal votes		5,735	97.8	
Informal votes		129	2.2	
Turnout		5,864	72.3	
Labour hold				

==== 1906 by-election ====
1906 Cootamundra by-election Saturday 28 July
Party	Candidate	Votes	%	±%
Labour	William Holman (re-elected)	2,296	57.8	0.0
Farmers and Settlers	John Fitzpatrick	1,663	41.9	
Independent	John Norton	13	0.3	
Total formal votes		3,972	98.2	−1.0
Informal votes		72	1.8	+1.0
Turnout		4,044	58.5 (Note: Estimate based on an electoral roll of 6,916 at the 1904 election.)	−6.0
Labour hold		Swing		

John Norton (Independent) challenged William Holman to resign and both would contest Holman's seat of Cootamundra.

==== 1904 ====
1904 New South Wales state election: Cootamundra
Party	Candidate	Votes	%	±%
Labour	William Holman	2,559	57.8	
Progressive	John Barnes	1,868	42.2	
Total formal votes		4,427	99.2	
Informal votes		36	0.8	
Turnout		4,463	64.5	
Labour win		(new seat)		

Cootamundra was a new seat that consisted of part of The Murrumbidgee, and parts of the abolished seats of Gundagai, Wagga Wagga and Young. John Barnes was the member for Gundagai. The member for The Murrumbidgee was Thomas Fitzpatrick (Progressive) who unsuccessfully contested that seat. The member for Wagga Wagga James Gormly (Progressive) did not contest the election and was appointed to the Legislative Council. The member for Young was George Burgess (Labour) who successfully contested Burrangong. William Holman (Labour) was the member for the abolished seat of Grenfell.
