= Crowther, New South Wales =

Crowther
- Town
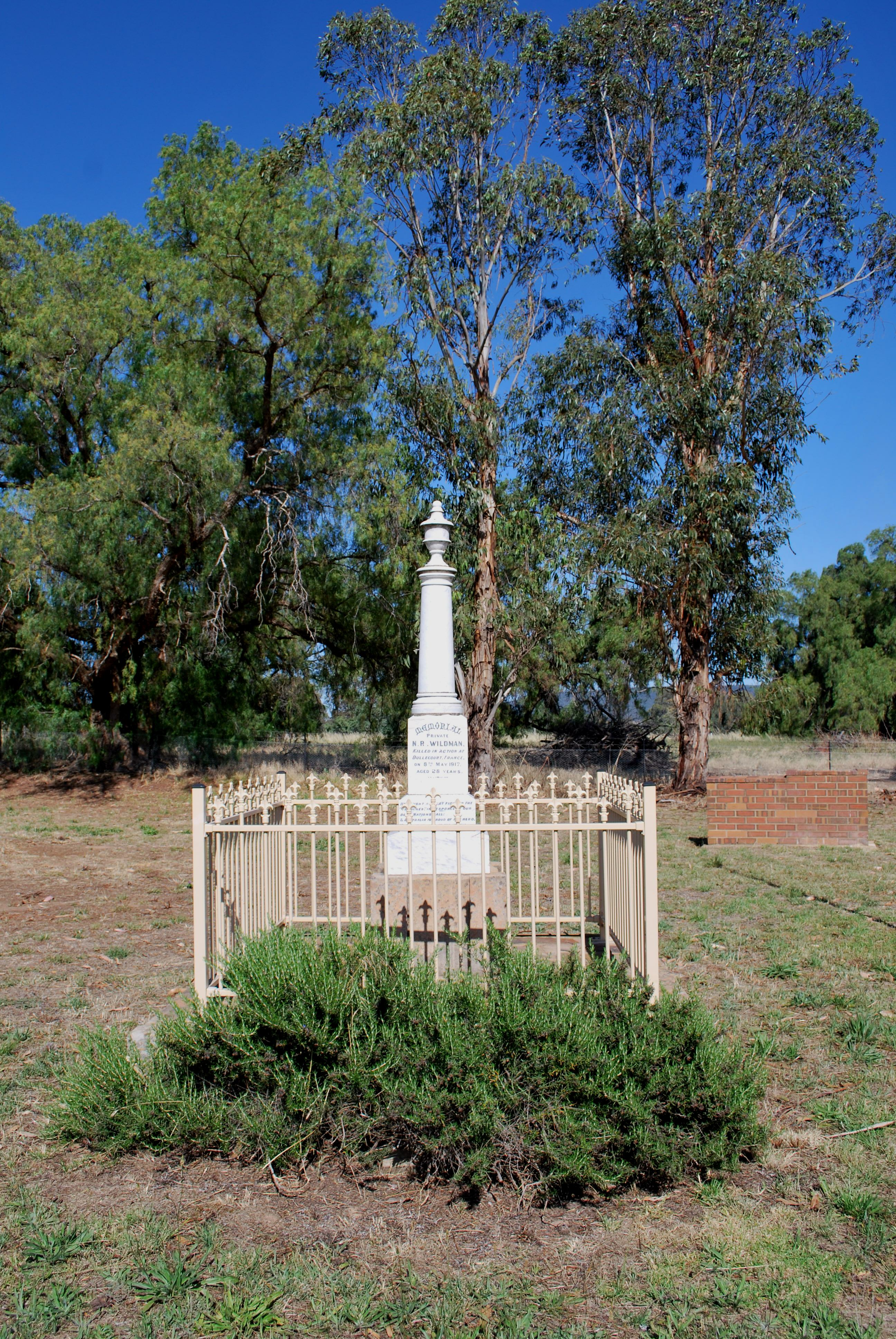
- War memorial at Crowther, 2008

- Coordinates: 34°05′49″S 148°30′23″E
- Country: Australia
- State: New South Wales
- LGA: Hilltops Council
- Location: 341 km (212 mi) W of Sydney; 35 km (22 mi) N of Young; 35 km (22 mi) S of Cowra; 8 km (5.0 mi) S of Koorawatha

Government
  - State electorate: Cootamunda
  - Federal division: Riverina

Population
  - Total: 78 (SAL 2021)
- Postcode: 2803

Crowther is a locality in New South Wales, Australia. The locality is in the Hilltops Council local government area and on the Olympic Highway, 341 kilometres (212 mi) west of the state capital, Sydney.

At the 2016 census, Crowther had a population of 55, which had grown to 78 at the 2021 census.

A War Memorial was erected in Crowther to honour the death of local sharefarmer Private Nugent Robert Wildman in Bullecourt, France in May 1917 and includes an honour roll of local men who served in World War I.

== See also ==
- Crowther railway station
