= 2017 Cootamundra state by-election =

Election result for Cootamundra, New South Wales, Australia

- 14 October 2017

	First party	Second party	Third party
			SFF
Candidate	Steph Cooke	Charlie Sheahan	Matthew Stadtmiller
Party	National	Labor	SFF
Popular vote	21,093	10,930	10,621
Percentage	46.2%	24.0%	23.3%
Swing	▼19.6pp	▼2.0pp	▲23.3pp
TPP	60.5%	39.5%
TPP swing	▼10.0pp	▲10.0pp
MP before election
Katrina Hodgkinson
National
Elected MP
Steph Cooke
National

A by-election was held in the state electoral district of Cootamundra on 14 October 2017. The by-election was triggered by the resignation of Katrina Hodgkinson (National). The by-election was won by Steph Cooke for the National Party on preferences. The Nationals suffered a 20% swing on first preference votes and 10% on a two-party basis.

The by-election was held on the same day as by-elections in Blacktown and Murray.

== Candidates ==
The candidates in ballot paper order are as follows:

Candidate nominations
Party	Candidate	Notes (not on ballot paper)
Christian Democratic Party (Fred Nile Group)	Philip Langfield	
Greens NSW	Jeffrey Passlow	Formerly chief hospital pathology scientist and then a businessman, veteran environmentalist. Retired to a farm where he now raises boar goats and Wiltshire Horn sheep. He is an advocate for marriage equality and a transition to renewable energy.
Shooters, Fishers and Farmers	Matthew Stadtmiller	Newspaper proprietor, former councillor and council candidate.
Independent	Jim Saleam	Veteran anti-immigration activist and president of the Australia First Party, is standing as an Independent as the party is not registered for state elections.
Country Labor	Charlie Sheahan	Councillor on Cootamundra-Gundagai Regional Council and farm manager who will seek to capitalise on opposition to forced council mergers in New South Wales.
The Nationals	Steph Cooke	Businesswoman and 2017 NSW Florist of the Year.

== Results ==
2017 Cootamundra by-election Saturday 14 October
Party	Candidate	Votes	%	±%
National	Steph Cooke	21,093	46.2	−19.6
Labor	Charlie Sheahan	10,930	24.0	−2.0
Shooters, Fishers, Farmers	Matthew Stadtmiller	10,621	23.3	+23.3
Christian Democrats	Philip Langfield	1,273	2.8	+0.5
Greens	Jeffrey Passlow	1,238	2.7	−0.8
Ind. Australia First	Jim Saleam	453	1.0	+1.0
Total formal votes		45,608	97.7	+0.4
Informal votes		1,057	2.3	−0.4
Turnout		46,665	87.2	−4.7
Two-party-preferred result
National	Steph Cooke	24,114	60.5	−10.0
Labor	Charlie Sheahan	15,769	39.5	+10.0
National hold		Swing	−10.0	

== See also ==
- Electoral results for the district of Cootamundra
- List of New South Wales state by-elections
