= Electoral results for the district of Burrinjuck =

Election results for Burrinjuck, New South Wales, Australia

Burrinjuck, an electoral district of the Legislative Assembly in the Australian state of New South Wales was created in 1950 and abolished in 2015.

Election	Member	Party
1950	Bill Sheahan	Labor
1953	Bill Sheahan	Labor
1956	Bill Sheahan	Labor
1959	Bill Sheahan	Labor
1962	Bill Sheahan	Labor
1965	Bill Sheahan	Labor
1968	Bill Sheahan	Labor
1971	Bill Sheahan	Labor
1973	Terry Sheahan	Labor
1976	Terry Sheahan	Labor
1978	Terry Sheahan	Labor
1981	Terry Sheahan	Labor
1984	Terry Sheahan	Labor
1988	Alby Schultz	Liberal
1991	Alby Schultz	Liberal
1995	Alby Schultz	Liberal
1999	Katrina Hodgkinson	National
2003	Katrina Hodgkinson	National
2007	Katrina Hodgkinson	National
2011	Katrina Hodgkinson	National

== Election results ==
=== Elections in the 2010s ===
==== 2011 ====
2011 New South Wales state election: Burrinjuck
Party	Candidate	Votes	%	±%
National	Katrina Hodgkinson	33,339	74.4	+9.7
Labor	Luna Zivadinovic	6,653	14.8	−14.3
Greens	Iain Fyfe	3,574	8.0	+1.8
Christian Democrats	Ann Woods	1,262	2.8	+2.8
Total formal votes		44,828	97.8	−0.3
Informal votes		1,025	2.2	+0.3
Turnout		45,853	93.8	
Two-party-preferred result
National	Katrina Hodgkinson	34,618	81.1	+13.7
Labor	Luna Zivadinovic	8,093	18.9	−13.7
National hold		Swing	+13.7	

=== Elections in the 2000s ===
==== 2007 ====
2007 New South Wales state election: Burrinjuck
Party	Candidate	Votes	%	±%
National	Katrina Hodgkinson	27,939	64.7	+7.5
Labor	Jessica Forde	12,601	29.2	−3.8
Greens	Iain Fyfe	2,645	6.1	+1.8
Total formal votes		43,185	98.0	−0.2
Informal votes		862	2.0	+0.2
Turnout		44,047	93.5	
Two-party-preferred result
National	Katrina Hodgkinson	28,442	67.3	+4.9
Labor	Jessica Forde	13,799	32.7	−4.9
National hold		Swing	+4.9	

==== 2003 ====
2003 New South Wales state election: Burrinjuck
Party	Candidate	Votes	%	±%
National	Katrina Hodgkinson	20,573	50.3	+21.1
Labor	Michael McManus	16,913	41.3	+4.5
Greens	Bob Muntz	1,743	4.3	+1.7
One Nation	Michael Macdonald	731	1.8	−9.6
Christian Democrats	Susan Pinsuti	533	1.3	+0.0
Independent	Lindsay Cosgrove	421	1.0	+1.0
Total formal votes		40,914	98.5	+0.1
Informal votes		635	1.5	−0.1
Turnout		41,549	93.9	
Two-party-preferred result
National	Katrina Hodgkinson	21,301	54.1	+2.9
Labor	Michael McManus	18,046	45.9	−2.9
National hold		Swing	+2.9	

=== Elections in the 1990s ===
==== 1999 ====
1999 New South Wales state election: Burrinjuck
Party	Candidate	Votes	%	±%
Labor	Michael McManus	14,580	36.8	−3.7
National	Katrina Hodgkinson	11,574	29.2	+29.2
Liberal	Gloria Schultz	6,589	16.6	−38.7
One Nation	Don Tarlinton	4,523	11.4	+11.4
Greens	Jan Green	1,041	2.6	+0.8
Democrats	Peter Fraser	657	1.7	+0.4
Christian Democrats	Zophia Newborne	496	1.3	+0.3
Citizens Electoral Council	Lindsay Cosgrove	157	0.4	+0.4
Total formal votes		39,617	98.3	+3.6
Informal votes		672	1.7	−3.6
Turnout		40,289	94.2	
Two-party-preferred result
National	Katrina Hodgkinson	17,160	51.2	+51.2
Labor	Michael McManus	16,343	48.8	+6.0
National gain from Liberal		Swing	−6.0	

==== 1995 ====
1995 New South Wales state election: Burrinjuck
Party	Candidate	Votes	%	±%
Liberal	Alby Schultz	20,487	59.9	+1.0
Labor	Michael McManus	13,732	40.1	−1.0
Total formal votes		34,219	93.9	+7.8
Informal votes		2,242	6.1	−7.8
Turnout		36,461	95.1	
Liberal hold		Swing	+1.0	

==== 1991 ====
1991 New South Wales state election: Burrinjuck
Party	Candidate	Votes	%	±%
Liberal	Alby Schultz	17,848	58.8	+33.5
Labor	George Martin	12,489	41.2	+0.8
Total formal votes		30,337	86.1	−12.3
Informal votes		4,909	13.9	+12.3
Turnout		35,246	94.7	
Liberal hold		Swing	+1.9	

=== Elections in the 1980s ===
==== 1988 ====
1988 New South Wales state election: Burrinjuck
Party	Candidate	Votes	%	±%
Labor	Terry Sheahan	12,969	43.2	−10.3
Liberal	Alby Schultz	9,437	31.4	+21.3
National	Richard Wood	7,646	25.4	−8.4
Total formal votes		30,052	98.4	−0.6
Informal votes		498	1.6	+0.6
Turnout		30,550	94.3	
Two-party-preferred result
Liberal	Alby Schultz	15,907	53.7	+53.7
Labor	Terry Sheahan	13,692	46.3	−8.6
Liberal gain from Labor		Swing	+8.6	

==== 1984 ====
1984 New South Wales state election: Burrinjuck
Party	Candidate	Votes	%	±%
Labor	Terry Sheahan	17,377	52.8	−2.8
National	John Sharp	14,643	44.5	+3.1
Democrats	Joyce Copeland	885	2.7	−0.3
Total formal votes		32,905	99.0	+0.3
Informal votes		323	1.0	−0.3
Turnout		33,228	94.0	−0.4
Two-party-preferred result
Labor	Terence Sheahan		54.3	−2.9
National	John Sharp		45.7	+2.9
Labor hold		Swing	−2.9	

==== 1981 ====
1981 New South Wales state election: Burrinjuck
Party	Candidate	Votes	%	±%
Labor	Terry Sheahan	17,709	55.6	−4.0
National Country	John Harvey	13,190	41.4	+1.0
Democrats	Scott Milne	939	3.0	+3.0
Total formal votes		31,838	98.7	
Informal votes		420	1.3	
Turnout		32,258	94.4	
Two-party-preferred result
Labor	Terry Sheahan	17,804	57.2	−2.4
National Country	John Harvey	13,299	42.8	+2.4
Labor hold		Swing	−2.4	

=== Elections in the 1970s ===
==== 1978 ====
1978 New South Wales state election: Burrinjuck
Party	Candidate	Votes	%	±%
Labor	Terry Sheahan	13,865	66.9	+8.1
National Country	Craddock Adams	6,870	33.1	−8.1
Total formal votes		20,735	98.6	−0.5
Informal votes		301	1.4	+0.5
Turnout		21,036	95.1	−0.3
Labor hold		Swing	+8.1	

==== 1976 ====
1976 New South Wales state election: Burrinjuck
Party	Candidate	Votes	%	±%
Labor	Terry Sheahan	12,028	58.8	+9.8
Country	Thomas Glover	8,416	41.2	+13.1
Total formal votes		20,444	99.1	+0.9
Informal votes		188	0.9	−0.9
Turnout		20,632	95.4	+0.3
Labor hold		Swing	+6.8	

==== 1973 ====
1973 New South Wales state election: Burrinjuck
Party	Candidate	Votes	%	±%
Labor	Terry Sheahan	9,690	49.0	−9.5
Liberal	Leon Garry	4,079	20.6	+1.9
Country	James Brooks	2,876	14.5	−8.3
Country	Edward O'Connor	2,702	13.6	+13.6
Democratic Labor	John Roche	442	2.2	+2.2
Total formal votes		19,789	98.2	
Informal votes		363	1.8	
Turnout		20,152	95.1	
Two-party-preferred result
Labor	Terry Sheahan	10,300	52.0	−7.8
Country	James Brooks	9,489	48.0	+7.8
Labor hold		Swing	−7.8	

==== 1971 ====
1971 New South Wales state election: Burrinjuck
Party	Candidate	Votes	%	±%
Labor	Bill Sheahan	11,053	58.5	+4.3
Country	Edward O'Connor	4,306	22.8	−4.9
Liberal	Leon Garry	3,535	18.7	+4.9
Total formal votes		18,894	99.2	
Informal votes		153	0.8	
Turnout		19,047	95.3	
Two-party-preferred result
Labor	Bill Sheahan	11,300	59.8	+3.9
Country	Edward O'Connor	7,594	40.2	−3.9
Labor hold		Swing	+3.9	

=== Elections in the 1960s ===
==== 1968 ====
1968 New South Wales state election: Burrinjuck
Party	Candidate	Votes	%	±%
Labor	Bill Sheahan	10,980	54.2	−1.8
Country	Douglas Boag	5,611	27.7	−5.6
Liberal	Leon Garry	2,804	13.8	+3.1
Democratic Labor	Anthony Abbey	870	4.3	+4.3
Total formal votes		20,265	98.4	
Informal votes		329	1.6	
Turnout		20,594	95.8	
Two-party-preferred result
Labor	Bill Sheahan	11,322	55.9	−0.7
Country	Douglas Boag	8,943	44.1	+0.7
Labor hold		Swing	−0.7	

==== 1965 ====
1965 New South Wales state election: Burrinjuck
Party	Candidate	Votes	%	±%
Labor	Bill Sheahan	9,617	56.0	−1.0
Country	Douglas Boag	5,725	33.3	−9.7
Liberal	Stanley Ablamowicz	1,841	10.7	+10.7
Total formal votes		17,183	99.1	−0.3
Informal votes		162	0.9	+0.3
Turnout		17,345	96.2	+0.5
Two-party-preferred result
Labor	Bill Sheahan	9,727	56.6	−0.4
Country	Douglas Boag	7,456	43.4	+0.4
Labor hold		Swing	−0.4	

==== 1962 ====
1962 New South Wales state election: Burrinjuck
Party	Candidate	Votes	%	±%
Labor	Bill Sheahan	9,702	57.0	+1.4
Country	David Asimus	7,315	43.0	−1.4
Total formal votes		17,017	99.4	
Informal votes		103	0.6	
Turnout		17,120	95.7	
Labor hold		Swing	+1.4	

=== Elections in the 1950s ===
==== 1959 ====
1959 New South Wales state election: Burrinjuck
Party	Candidate	Votes	%	±%
Labor	Bill Sheahan	10,097	55.6	
Country	Allan Johnson	8,078	44.4	
Total formal votes		18,175	99.3	
Informal votes		131	0.7	
Turnout		18,306	95.3	
Labor hold		Swing		

==== 1956 ====
1956 New South Wales state election: Burrinjuck
Party	Candidate	Votes	%	±%
Labor	Bill Sheahan	10,124	55.0	−4.5
Country	Allan Johnson	8,278	45.0	+13.0
Total formal votes		18,402	99.2	+0.3
Informal votes		153	0.8	−0.3
Turnout		18,555	95.6	0.0
Labor hold		Swing	+1.2	

==== 1953 ====
1953 New South Wales state election: Burrinjuck
Party	Candidate	Votes	%	±%
Labor	Bill Sheahan	10,809	59.5	
Country	Robert Stewart	5,812	32.0	
Independent	Barney Morton	1,212	6.7	
Independent	John Cusack	337	1.9	
Total formal votes		18,170	98.9	
Informal votes		205	1.1	
Turnout		18,375	95.6	
Two-party-preferred result
Labor	Bill Sheahan	11,538	63.5	
Country	Robert Stewart	6,632	36.5	
Labor hold		Swing		

==== 1950 ====
1950 New South Wales state election: Burrinjuck
Party	Candidate	Votes	%	±%
Labor	Bill Sheahan	10,159	57.2	
Country	William Ross	7,615	42.8	
Total formal votes		17,774	99.3	
Informal votes		123	0.7	
Turnout		17,897	94.8	
Labor notional hold				

Burrinjuck was a new seat, largely replacing Yass. Bill Sheahan (Labor) was the member for Yass.
