= Burrangong railway station =

Railway station in New South Wales, Australia

Burrangong

General information
- Location: Chillingworks Road, Burrangong; New South Wales; Australia
- Coordinates: 34°17′09″S 148°16′02″E
- Operator: Department of Railways
- Line: Blayney–Demondrille
- Distance: 436.130 km (270.999 mi) from Central
- Platforms: 1 (1 side)
- Tracks: 1

Construction
- Structure type: Ground

Other information
- Status: Demolished

History
- Opened: 1 February 1889 (137 years ago)
- Closed: 27 February 1971 (55 years ago)

Services
Preceding station	Former services	Following station
Maimuru towards Blayney	Blayney–Demondrille Line	Young towards Harden
Location

Burrangong railway station was a regional railway station located on the Blayney–Demondrille line, serving the South Western Slopes town of Burrangong.

== History ==
The line between Young and Cowra opened on 1 November 1886, but a station at Burrangong was not provided until 1 February 1889. A passenger platform was provided, with a timber waiting shed opening in 1891. A good siding initially provided was converted into a loop in 1891, which was converted back to a siding in 1899. The siding was abolished in 1938, and the waiting shed removed in 1964. The station closed in 1971 and little trace remains.
