= Wattamondara railway station =

Railway station in New South Wales, Australia

Coordinates: 33.9391°S 148.6063°E

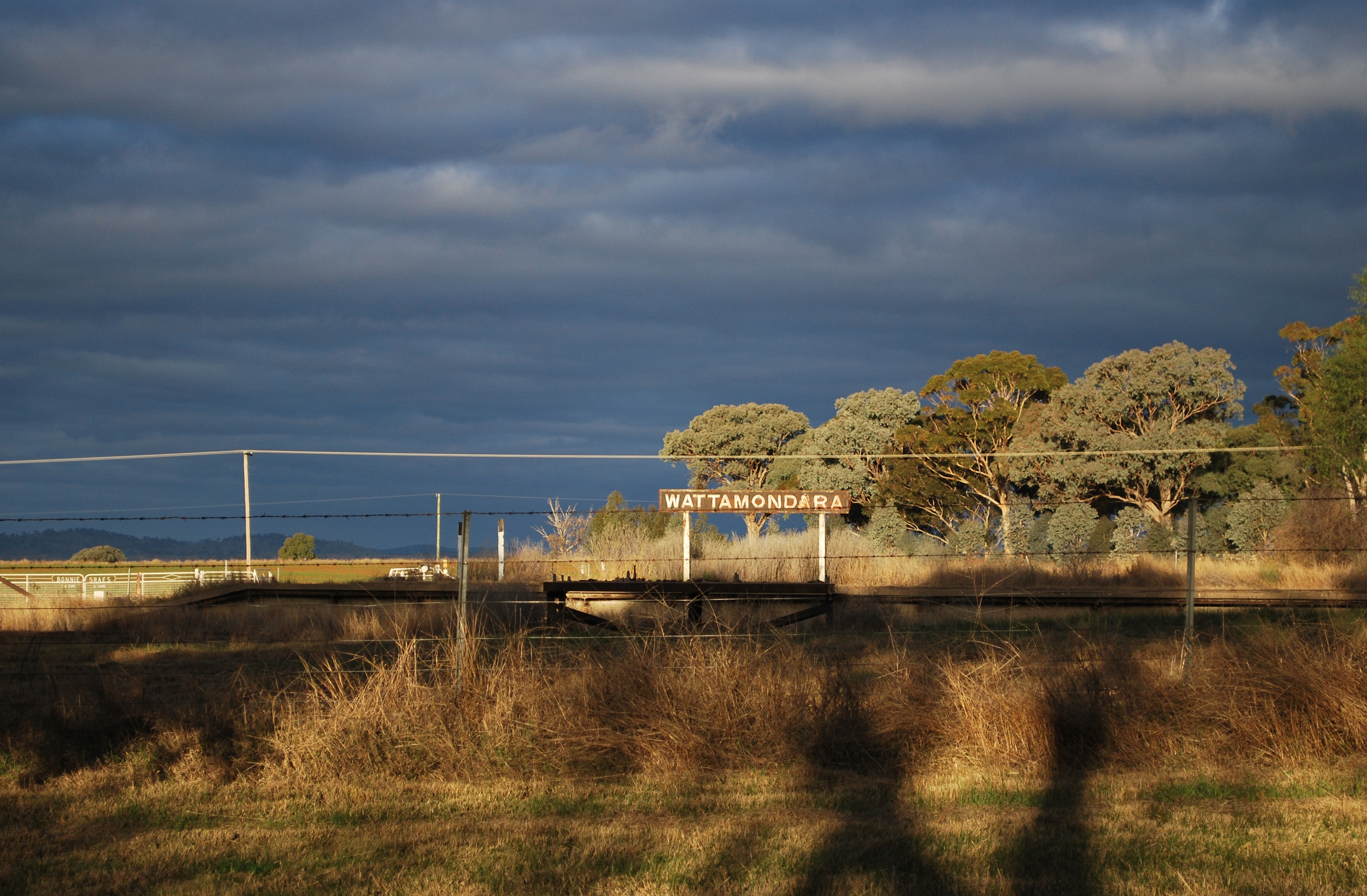
Wattamondara station

Wattamondara railway station is a railway station on the Blayney–Demondrille railway line in western, New South Wales(Australia).
