= Bendick Murrell =

Bendick Murrell New South Wales
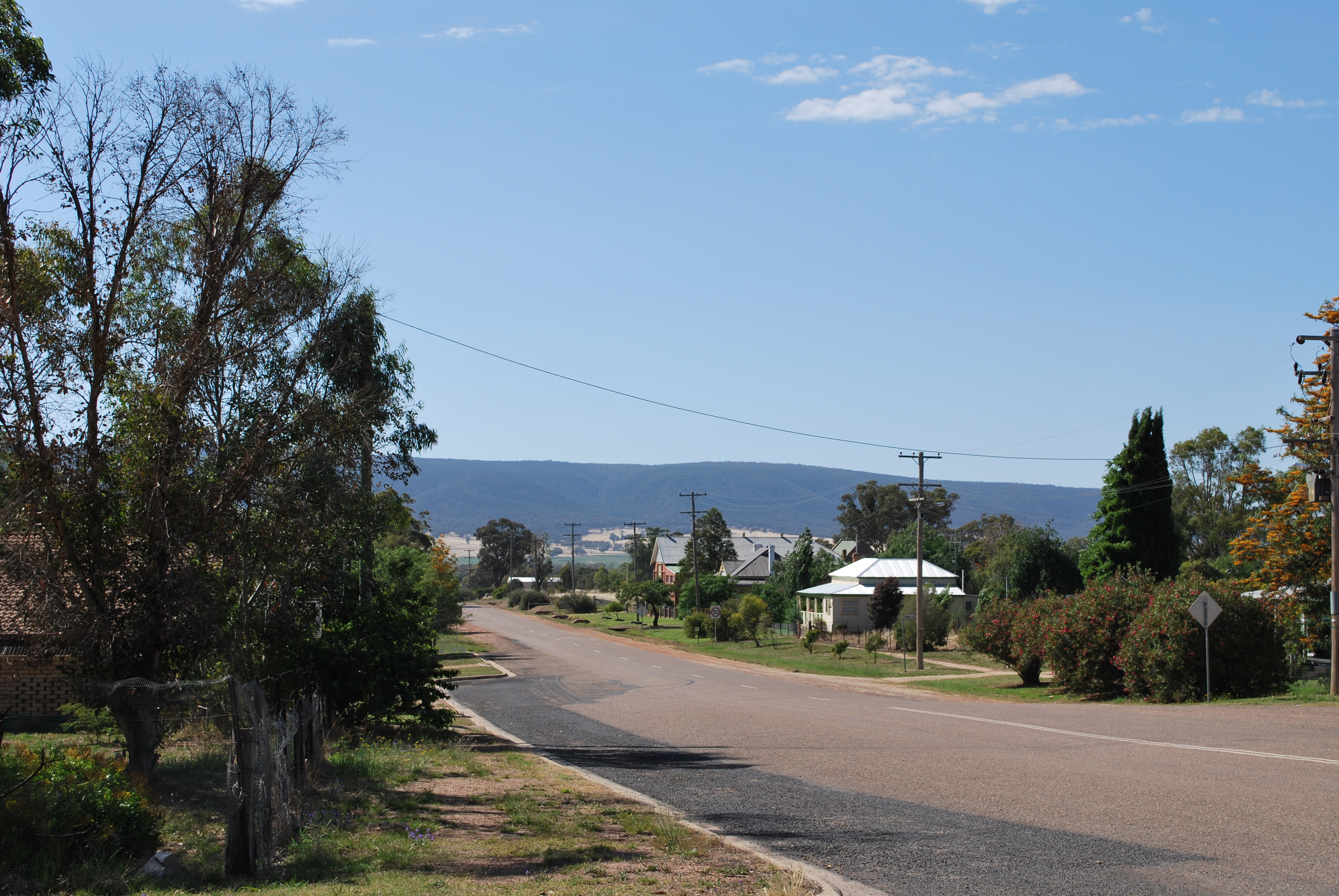
- Main Street, Bendick Murrell

- Coordinates: 34°09′54″S 148°27′04″E
- Population: 143 (SAL 2021)
- Postcode(s): 2803
- Location: 354 km (220 mi) W of Sydney; 151 km (94 mi) SW of Bathurst; 47 km (29 mi) SW of Cowra; 26 km (16 mi) NE of Young
- LGA(s): Hilltops Council
- State electorate(s): Cootamundra
- Federal division(s): Riverina

Bendick Murrell is a town in the South West Slopes region of New South Wales, Australia.

== Locality ==
The town is adjacent to the Olympic Highway within the Hilltops local government area, 354 kilometres (220 mi) west of the state capital, Sydney. The town is on the Blayney–Demondrille railway line. At the 2016 census, Bendick Murrell and the surrounding area had a population of 155, but had dropped to 143 in 2021.

== Name ==
The name of the town is Aboriginal in origin, meaning "plain" and was originally given a local pastoral station.

== Services ==
A provisional school was established in 1883 and the existing school has occupied the same site since 1894. A receiving post office was opened in 1887. Bendick Murrell railway station opened in 1888, originally as Marengo. It was renamed Bendick Murrell in 1889. The original station was further south than the current location as the station was relocated in 1915 to allow for the expansion of grain loading facilities.
