= Bribbaree =

Bribbaree New South Wales
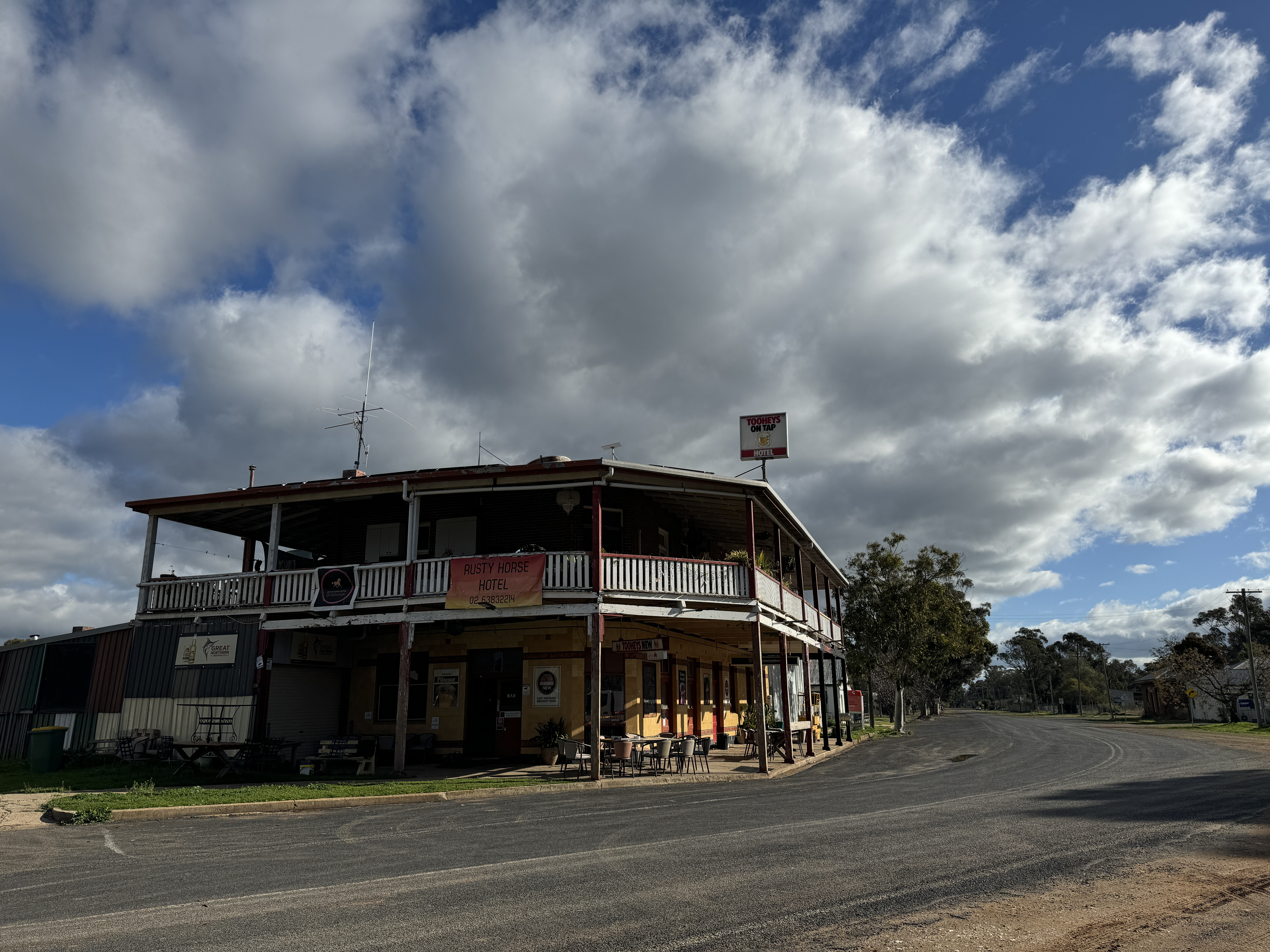
- Rusty Horse Hotel, July 2024

- Coordinates: 34°06′55″S 147°52′4″E
- Population: 144 (SAL 2021)
- Postcode(s): 2594
- Location: 408 km (254 mi) WSW of Sydney; 212 km (132 mi) NW of Canberra; 38 km (24 mi) NW of Young
- LGA(s): Weddin Shire; Hilltops Council
- State electorate(s): Cootamundra
- Federal division(s): Riverina

Bribbaree is a small village in the South West Slopes region of New South Wales, Australia spanning the boundary of Weddin Shire and Hilltops Council. The name is also applied to the surrounding area, for postal and statistical purposes. The population of Bribbaree was reported as 267 at the 2011 census, and 141 at the 2016 census and had increased to 144 at the 2021 census.

== History ==
The village grew as a result of the completion of the Stockinbingal-Parkes railway line. Bribbaree railway station opened in 1916.

Bribbaree was declared a village in the Shire of Burrangong on 23 March 1917. 34.8 hectares (86 acres) were set aside for the township, with a further 97 hectares (240 acres) designated suburban land. A sale of Crown Lands was subsequently held in Young on 8 August 1917 at which all but six of the 29 lots offered were sold.

The settlement was named after the adjacent Bribbaree Creek. According to C. A. Irish, the name "Bribbaree" is derived from "Boorri-Boolla", a combination of "Boorri" meaning "boy" and "Boollo", "two", from a nearby rock formation.

A monument to the five soldiers from Bribbaree who died in World War I was erected in 1921–1922. They were Charles Ernest Downey, Alfred Downey, Anthony Steel Caldwell, Hugh Wallace McAlister and Percy William Geraty.

Bribbaree railway station closed in 1983.

== See also ==
- Bribbaree railway station
