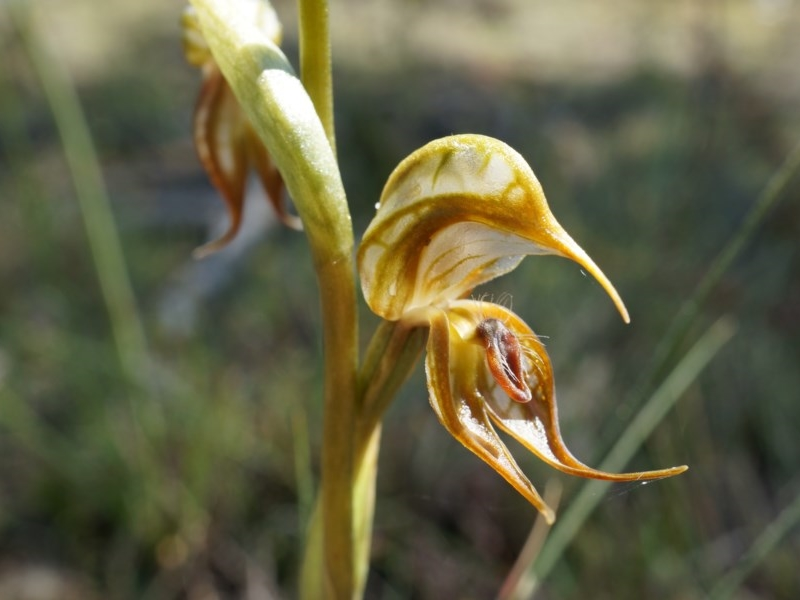

Scientific classification
- Kingdom: Plantae
- Clade: Tracheophytes
- Clade: Angiosperms
- Clade: Monocots
- Order: Asparagales
- Family: Orchidaceae
- Subfamily: Orchidoideae
- Tribe: Cranichideae
- Genus: Pterostylis
- Species: P. hamata

Binomial name
- Pterostylis hamata Blackmore & Clemesha

Synonyms
- Oligochaetochilus hamatus (Blackmore & Clemesha) Szlach.

= Pterostylis hamata =

Southern hooked rustyhood

Species of orchid

Pterostylis hamata, commonly known as the southern hooked rustyhood, is a plant in the orchid family Orchidaceae and is endemic to eastern Australia. It has a rosette of leaves and between two and twelve transparent flowers with green and brown markings, a thick, brown, insect-like labellum and dished lateral sepals.

== Description ==
Pterostylis hamata, is a terrestrial, perennial, deciduous, herb with an underground tuber. It has a rosette of between six and fifteen egg-shaped leaves at the base of the flowering spike, each leaf 20–30 mm (0.8–1 in) long and 6–12 mm (0.2–0.5 in) wide. Between two and twelve transparent flowers with green and brown markings, each flower 19–22 mm (0.7–0.9 in) long and 7–8 mm (0.3–0.3 in) wide, are borne on a flowering spike 200–400 mm (8–20 in) tall. Two to eight stem leaves are wrapped around the flowering spike. The dorsal sepal and petals form a hood or "galea" over the column with the dorsal sepal having a downturned, thread-like point 4–7 mm (0.2–0.3 in) long. The lateral sepals turn downwards and are joined for about half their length and shallowly dished with the edges curved inwards. The lateral sepals also suddenly narrow to thread-like tips 12–15 mm (0.5–0.6 in) long which curve forwards with hooked ends. The labellum is brown, fleshy, insect-like, about 5 mm (0.2 in) long, 2 mm (0.08 in) wide and grooved and has long and short bristles around its edges. Flowering occurs from September to November.

== Taxonomy and naming ==
Pterostylis hamata was first formally described in 1968 by John Blackmore and Stephen Clemesha from a specimen collected near Koorawatha and the description was published in The Orchadian. The specific epithet (hamata) is a Latin word meaning "hooked".

== Distribution and habitat ==
The southern hooked rustyhood occurs in the eastern half of New South Wales, the north-east corner of Victoria and in Queensland, growing in rocky places in open forest.
