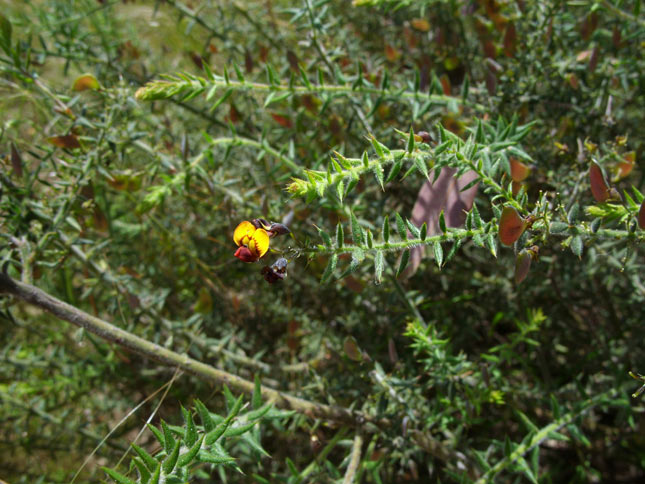
- In Koorawatha Nature Reserve

Scientific classification
- Kingdom: Plantae
- Clade: Tracheophytes
- Clade: Angiosperms
- Clade: Eudicots
- Clade: Rosids
- Order: Fabales
- Family: Fabaceae
- Subfamily: Faboideae
- Genus: Daviesia
- Species: D. pubigera

Binomial name
- Daviesia pubigera A.Cunn. ex Benth.

Synonyms
- Daviesia pubigera A.Cunn. ex Benth. isonym; Daviesia recurvata Maiden & R.T.Baker; Daviesia umbellulata var. pubigera (A.Cunn. ex Benth.) Benth.

= Daviesia pubigera =

Species of flowering plant

Daviesia pubigera is a species of flowering plant in the family Fabaceae and is endemic to New South Wales. It is an open to spreading shrub with sharply-pointed, narrowly egg-shaped phyllodes, and yellow and red flowers.

== Description ==
Daviesia pubigera is an open to spreading shrub that typically grows to a height of 0.7–2 m (2 ft 4 in – 6 ft 7 in) and has hairy branchlets and phyllodes. The phyllodes are sharply-pointed, narrowly egg-shaped, 5–14 mm (0.20–0.55 in) long and 1–4.5 mm (0.039–0.177 in) wide. The flowers are usually arranged singly, sometimes in pairs on a peduncle 2.5–5 mm (0.098–0.197 in) long, each flower on a pedicel 2–4 mm (0.079–0.157 in) long with bracts about 1 mm (0.039 in) long at the base. The sepals are 3.0–3.5 mm (0.12–0.14 in) long, the upper two lobes joined for most of their length and the lower three about 1 mm (0.039 in) long. The standard petal is elliptic with a notched centre, 5.5–7 mm (0.22–0.28 in) long, 4–7 mm (0.16–0.28 in) wide and yellow with thin red ring surrounding the yellow centre. The wings are 5.5–6.5 mm (0.22–0.26 in) long and red, the keel 4.5–5.0 mm (0.18–0.20 in) long and red. Flowering occurs from September to December and the fruit is a triangular pod 8–10 mm (0.31–0.39 in) long.

== Taxonomy and naming ==
Daviesia pubigera was first formally described in 1837 by George Bentham from an unpublished manuscript by Allan Cunningham. Bentham's description was published in his Commentationes de Leguminosarum Generibus. The specific epithet (pubigera) means "bearing soft hairs".

== Distribution and habitat ==
This bitter-pea grows in on low hills and steep rocky slopes in open forest and heath mainly on the western slopes of New South Wales from the Queensland border to near Boorowa.
