= Monteagle, New South Wales =

Monteagle New South Wales
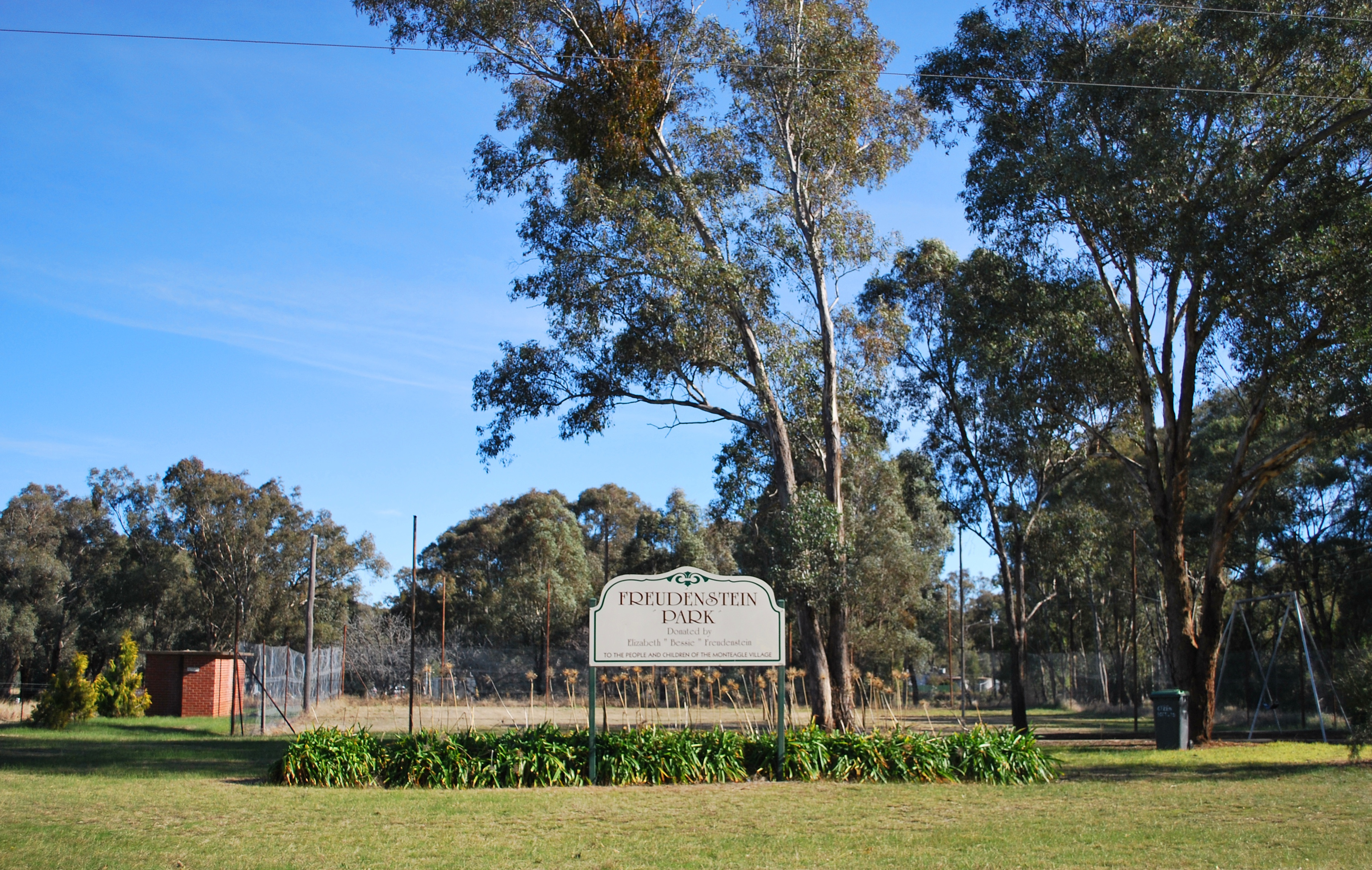
- Freudenstein Park at Monteaglee

- Coordinates: 34°11′23″S 148°20′35″E
- Population: 213 (SAL 2021)
- Postcode(s): 2594
- Elevation: 440 m (1,444 ft)
- Location: 366 km (227 mi) SW of Sydney; 15 km (9 mi) N of Young
- LGA(s): Hilltops Council
- State electorate(s): Cootamundra
- Federal division(s): Riverina

Monteagle is a locality in the South West Slopes region of New South Wales, Australia. The locality is in the Hilltops Council local government area, 366 kilometres (227 mi) south west of the state capital, Sydney.

At the 2016 census, Monteagle had a population of 208 and had grown to 213 at the 2021 census.
