= Crowther railway station =

Former railway station in New South Wales, Australia

Coordinates: 34.0976°S 149.4915°E

Crowther station was located on the Blayney–Demondrille railway line, New South Wales, Australia.

It was always an "a" stop in the public timetables, meaning that passenger trains only stopped if passengers wished to join or alight. No passenger train was scheduled to stop.

== Construction ==
The line between Young and Cowra was opened in 1886, but Crowther station was not opened until 1888 and, initially, no platform was provided. The facilities at the station at the time of opening are unknown, however a platform 45 feet (13.7 m) long was completed on 1 December 1889.

== Water tank ==
Crowther was located at the foot of a 5-mile (8 km) steep gradient. In the 1890s, freight trains stopped at the station to split their loads into two sections. This practice ceased about 1900 when more powerful locomotives were introduced.

Crowther Creek, situated 1 mile 17 chains (1.95 km) south of the station, was the location for the supply of water for steam locomotives. In 1888, a well was built in the creek bed and a pump, powered by a steam boiler, raised water to a 20,000 gallon (75686 litre) water tank to which was attached an 8-inch (20 cm) jib. The tank was placed out of service in 1905 following the establishment of a permanent water supply at Koorawatha.

== Traffic at the station ==
Crowther was the quintessential small, rural Australia station. Its primary purpose was to convey rural products from the area to Sydney. The main products loaded were bagged wheat, wool and livestock. The platform and freight facilities were placed on the western side of the line to provide the most convenient access for the local landholder(s). Stockyards were provided until 1970 and the goods siding closed about 1980.

== Closure ==
The passenger station closed on 6 April 1975 and it was demolished 10 years later.
