= Bribbaree railway station =

Former railway station in New South Wales, Australia

Coordinates: 34°07′00″S 147°52′00″E

Bribbaree

Services
Preceding station	Former services	Following station
Weedallion towards Stockinbingal	Stockinbingal–Parkes Line	Eurabba towards Parkes
Location

Bribbaree is a closed station on the Stockinbingal- Parkes railway line at Bribbaree, New South Wales, Australia. It was opened in 1916, and was closed to passenger services in 1983 and subsequently demolished.

It is on a gently graded cross-country line connecting the Main South line and the Main West line, which provides an alternative route to the more steeply graded Sydney to Parkes line.
