= Maimuru =

Maimuru New South Wales
- Coordinates: 34°13′S 148°13′E
- Population: 145 (SAL 2021)
- Postcode(s): 2594
- Location: 10 km (6 mi) NW of Young
- LGA(s): Hilltops Council
- State electorate(s): Cootamundra
- Federal division(s): Riverina

Maimuru is a small village in southern New South Wales, Australia. The locality is in the Hilltops Council local government area.

At the 2016 census, Maimuru had a population of 137, which had increased to 145 at the 2021 census.

Maimuru Public School, located in School Road, celebrated its centenary in 2021.
