= Young railway station =

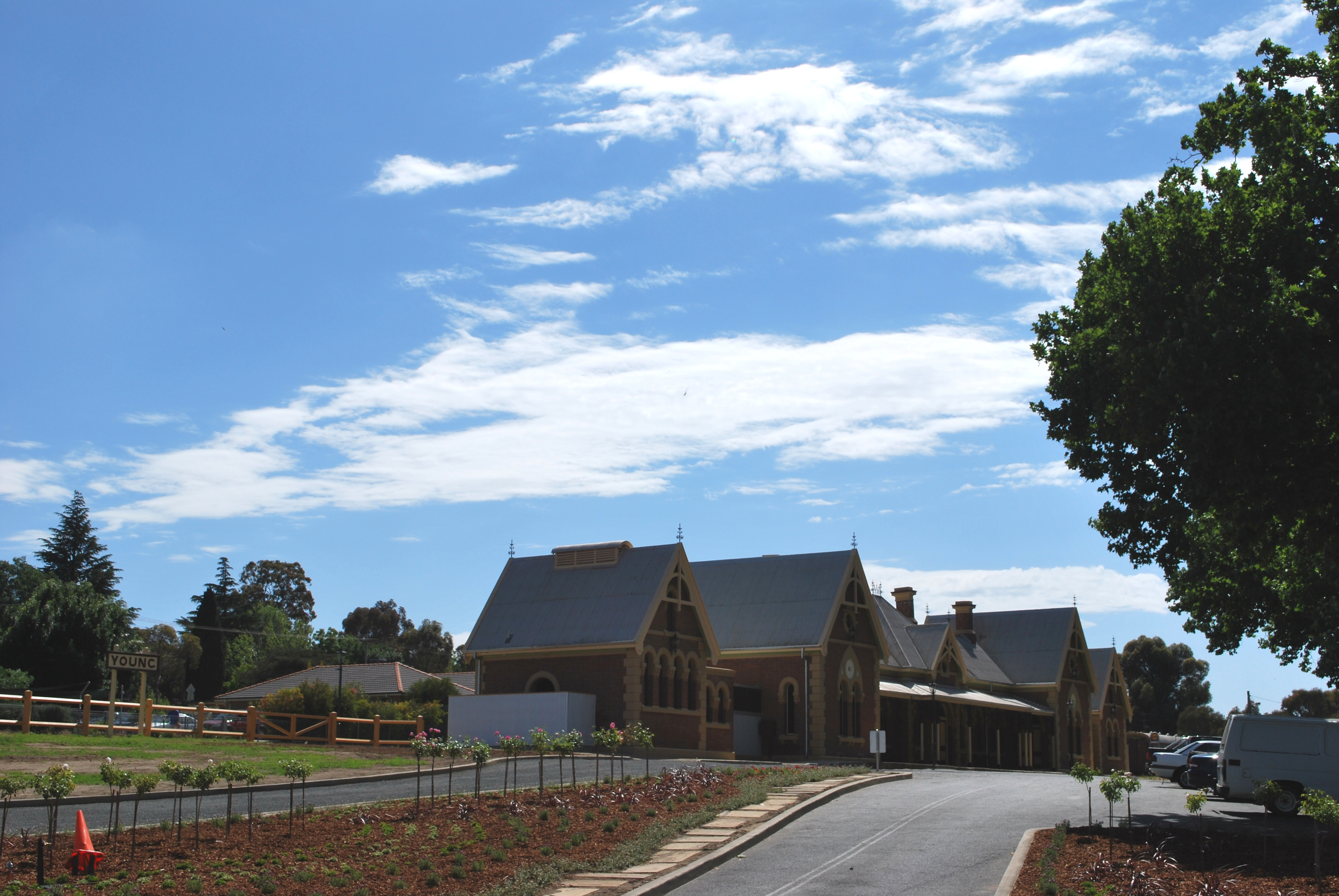
- The Young railway station, 2008

- Location of Young railway station in New South Wales Young railway station (Australia)
- 34°18′37″S 148°17′33″E
- Location: Blayney-Harden railway, Young, Hilltops Council, New South Wales, Australia

History
- Opened / Closed: 26 March 1885 – 15 December 1989

Site notes
- Architectural style: Victorian
- Current use: Young Visitors Centre
- Owner: Transport Asset Manager of New South Wales

New South Wales Heritage Register
- Official name: Young Railway Station and yard group
- Type: State heritage (complex / group)
- Designated: 2 April 1999
- Reference no.: 1294
- Type: Railway station
- Category: Transport – Rail

The Young railway station is a heritage-listed former railway station in the South West Slopes region of New South Wales, Australia. It is located on the Blayney-Harden railway line, in the town of Young. It is also known as Young Railway Station and yard group. The railway station and associated yards were added to the New South Wales State Heritage Register on 2 April 1999.

The station was opened on 26 March 1885 and was used for regional rail passenger transport up until its closure as a railway station on 15 December 1989; and is now used as a visitor centre. The Blayney-Harden railway line is now closed for rail traffic.

== History ==
During the construction of the southern and western railway lines in New South Wales in 1875 a line connecting the two was proposed. The line opened in March 1885. The station opened on 26 March 1885 and closed on 15 December 1989. Repairs were done on the station building in 2007.

As of 2023, the original station building houses the Hilltops Council Young Visitor Information Centre, Hilltops Wine Cellar Door and Burrangong Art Gallery, as well as an authentic disused railway carriage. In 2020, The Young Railway Interest Group received a grant to restore the carriage to "house a working diorama of Young Railway Station in 1960 when the railways were at the height".

== Description ==
There is a station building (type 5, first class brick) built in 1885. The platform face is made of stone. There are two timber overbridges located at 440 kilometres (274 mi) and 467 kilometres (290 mi) from Sydney's Central railway station situated along the railway line. There is landscaping of the station forecourt adjoining Council park area.

== Heritage listing ==
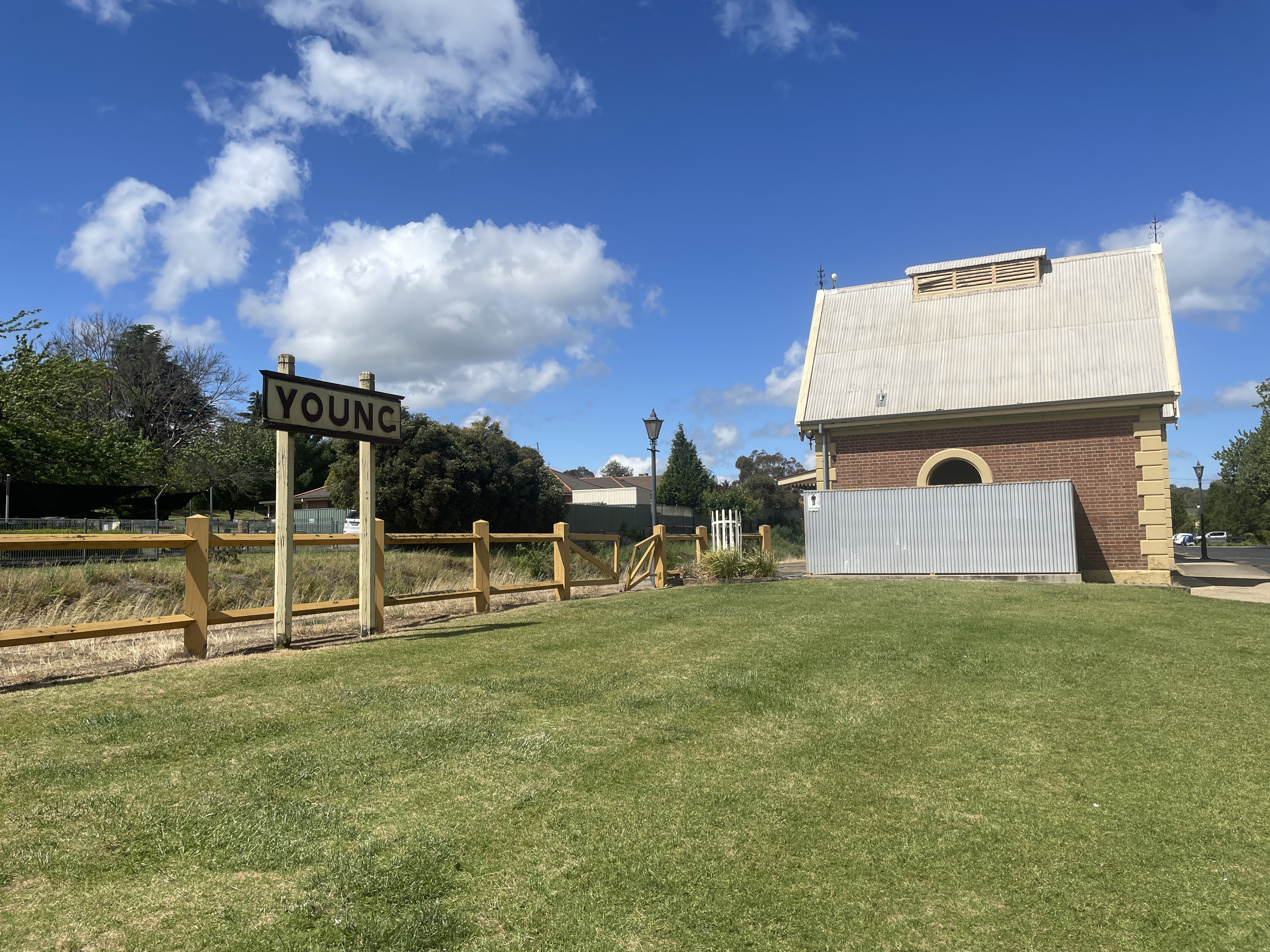
Young Railway Station (2023)

Young station complex represents a major first class Victorian terminus station on a single line with significant contribution to the townscape. Its steep gable roofs, symmetry and Gothic inspiration make it an architecturally interesting and unique station building. The building form is of a major civic building of local importance, situated on a rise overlooking the town and adjacent to Anderson Park, a large park with mature plantings of deciduous trees. The vista both to and from the building forms an integral part of the townscape and is included in the heritage listing.

The complex represents the importance of early railway construction to the local community by the scale of the building and the grandeur of the vision of railway expansion that was in full flight in the 1880s. The former gatekeepers cottage (now sold), located opposite the station, is in its original form which is contiguous with the station building and enhances the station and environs. The overbridges are good examples of timber structures that once prevalent are now increasingly rare. They were extensively used throughout the State for both major and minor crossings of railway lines.

Young railway station was listed on the New South Wales State Heritage Register on 2 April 1999 having satisfied the following criteria:

The place possesses uncommon, rare or endangered aspects of the cultural or natural history of New South Wales.

The station is assessed as being historically, architecturally, and socially rare.

== See also ==
- Regional railway stations in New South Wales
