= Burrangong Shire =

Former local government area in New South Wales, Australia

Burrangong Shire New South Wales
- Established: 7 March 1906
- Abolished: 1 July 1980
- Council seat: Young
- Region: South West Slopes

Burrangong Shire was a local government area in the South West Slopes region of New South Wales, Australia.

Burrangong Shire was proclaimed on 7 March 1906. The Council offices were located in Young, but the shire did not include Young.

The shire was amalgamated with the Municipality of Young to form Young Shire on 1 July 1980.
