= Electoral district of Burrinjuck =

Former state electoral district of New South Wales, Australia (1950–2015)

Burrinjuck New South Wales—Legislative Assembly
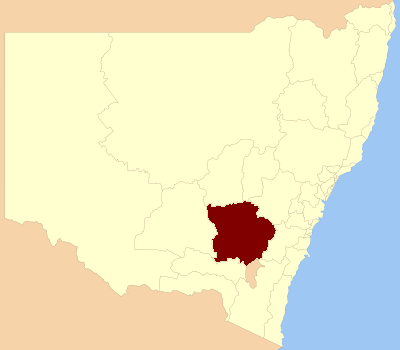
- Location in New South Wales
- State: New South Wales
- Created: 1950
- Abolished: 2015
- Electors: 48,924 (2011)
- Area: 48,158 km^{2} (18,593.9 sq mi)
- Demographic: Rural

Burrinjuck was an electoral district of the Legislative Assembly in the Australian state of New South Wales from 1950 to 2015.

The 2004 redistribution of electoral districts estimated that the electoral district would have 47,688 electors on 29 April 2007. At the 2007 election it encompassed almost all of Yass Valley Shire (including Yass, but excluding Sutton), all of the Upper Lachlan (including Crookwell and Gunning), Boorowa Council, Cowra Shire, a small part of Blayney Shire (including Mandurama and Lyndhurst), Weddin Shire (including Grenfell), a small part of Bland Shire, Young Shire, Harden Shire (including the twin towns of Harden and Murrumburrah), Cootamundra Shire, Gundagai Shire and part of Junee Shire (including Bethungra and Illabo).

At the 2015 election it was replaced by the re-established electoral district of Cootamundra and the relocated electoral district of Goulburn.

== Members for Burrinjuck ==
Member	Party	Period
Bill Sheahan	Labor	1950–1973
Terry Sheahan	Labor	1973–1988
Alby Schultz	Liberal	1988–1998
Katrina Hodgkinson	National	1999–2015

== Election results ==
2011 New South Wales state election: Burrinjuck
Party	Candidate	Votes	%	±%
National	Katrina Hodgkinson	33,339	74.4	+9.7
Labor	Luna Zivadinovic	6,653	14.8	−14.3
Greens	Iain Fyfe	3,574	8.0	+1.8
Christian Democrats	Ann Woods	1,262	2.8	+2.8
Total formal votes		44,828	97.8	−0.3
Informal votes		1,025	2.2	+0.3
Turnout		45,853	93.8	
Two-party-preferred result
National	Katrina Hodgkinson	34,618	81.1	+13.7
Labor	Luna Zivadinovic	8,093	18.9	−13.7
National hold		Swing	+13.7	
