= Alby Schultz =

Australian politician (1939–2015)

Member of the Australian Parliament for Hume
- In office 3 October 1998 – 5 August 2013
- Preceded by: John Sharp
- Succeeded by: Angus Taylor
- Majority: 8.72%

Member of the New South Wales Legislative Assembly for Burrinjuck
- In office 19 March 1988 – 1 September 1998
- Preceded by: Terence Sheahan
- Succeeded by: Katrina Hodgkinson

Personal details
- Born: Albert John Schultz; 29 May 1939 Melbourne, Victoria, Australia
- Died: 14 July 2015 (aged 76) Cootamundra, New South Wales, Australia
- Party: Liberal Party of Australia
- Spouse: Gloria Schultz
- Children: 2
- Occupation: Meat worker

Albert John Schultz (29 May 1939 – 14 July 2015) was an Australian politician. He was a Liberal member of the Australian House of Representatives from October 1998 to August 2013, representing the Division of Hume in New South Wales.

== Biography ==
=== Early life ===
Schultz was born in Melbourne, Victoria, and was a meat processing worker before entering politics. He was a field officer for the Liberal Party (1986–88) and a member of the Cootamundra Shire Council (1983–91).

=== Career ===
Schultz was the member for Burrinjuck in the New South Wales Legislative Assembly from 1988 to 1998, before being elected to represent Hume at the 1998 federal election. He was subsequently returned at the 2001, 2004, 2007 and 2010 elections. He gained national media attention in the lead up to the privatisation of Telstra claiming that he would not support the legislation but would not "cross the floor". In the end he abstained from voting on the matter.

In 2003, Schultz supported the death penalty for terrorists.

Schultz was initially a supporter of Prime Minister John Howard but as a result of being overlooked for promotion by Howard, Schultz in 2005 changed his allegiance to Howard's heir apparent Peter Costello.

However a year later in 2006, Schultz accused Costello of disloyalty to Howard following the revelation of a deal of when Howard would hand over the Prime Ministership to Costello.

Alby Schultz was one of the several Liberal Party politicians along with Peter Dutton, Don Randall, Wilson Tuckey, Concetta Fierravanti-Wells, Dennis Jensen and Sophie Mirabella, who boycotted Parliament on the day that the formal apology to the Stolen Generations was made by Prime Minister Kevin Rudd.

Schultz apologised in June 2009 for a physical confrontation with one of his Liberal parliamentary colleagues in a party room meeting in Parliament House. He had been angered by a remark made by Chris Pearce, the member for Aston in Victoria, during a debate about whether the Liberal Party should run candidates against National Party MPs. Schultz reportedly responded by grabbing Pearce around the neck. He later apologised to Pearce and the entire party room for the incident.

In September 2012 he prompted an investigation by the Department of Parliamentary Service about a "serious security breach" when he became aware his private calendar became accessible on other MP's computers. The investigation determined that his own office was responsible for the error when configuring the email service, by nominating access to multiple users.

Schultz retired at the 2013 Australian federal election.

In 2015 he was listed as patron of the anti-wind farm lobby, the Waubra Foundation.

== Personal ==
In 2003 he lost an eye in an accident with hydrochloric acid while cleaning a swimming pool filter, and in 2004 received a prosthetic eye.

Schultz was a staunch monarchist and long fought against the movement to make Australia a republic.

Not long before his retirement, in July 2013, Schultz was diagnosed with inoperable liver and oesophageal cancer. Two months before the diagnosis, it was revealed he had prostate cancer. He died on 14 July 2015, aged 76.

New South Wales Legislative Assembly
Preceded by Terry Sheahan	Member for Burrinjuck; 1988–1998	Succeeded by Katrina Hodgkinson
Parliament of Australia
Preceded by John Sharp	Member for Hume; 1998–2013	Succeeded by Angus Taylor
