= Ken Hoad =

Australian politician

Member of the New South Wales Parliament for Cootamundra
- In office 30 May 1925 – 18 May 1932 Serving with Peter Loughlin (1925-1927); Hugh Main (1925-1927)
- Preceded by: James McGirr
- Succeeded by: Bill Ross

Personal details
- Born: Kenneth Oswald Hoad; 13 November 1897 Junee, New South Wales
- Died: 7 June 1944 (aged 46) Junee, New South Wales
- Resting place: Junee Cemetery
- Party: Labor Party
- Spouse: Ida Kathleen Berger
- Occupation: Railway Porter

Kenneth Oswald Hoad (13 November 1897 – 7 June 1944) was an Australian politician. He was a Labor Party member of the New South Wales Legislative Assembly from 1925 to 1932, representing the electorate of Cootamundra.

Hoad was born in Junee, the son of James Hoad, a member of the Legislative Council. He was educated at Junee Public School, and joined the Railway Department in 1913. He was a porter at Junee from 1913 to 1917 and at Narrabri from 1917 to 1920, and then an operator at Junee from 1920 until his election to parliament in 1925. He was an alderman of the Junee Shire Council from 1919 until 1922, and from 1925 to 1928. He was also the branch secretary of the Railway and Tramway Professional Officers Association until 1925.

Hoad first attempted to enter state politics at the 1922 election, but was unsuccessful in winning one of the three seats in the Cootamundra electorate. In 1925, however, incumbent Labor MLA and future Premier James McGirr lost party endorsement, and Hoad, heavily supported by the railway unions, was elected to his seat. Cootamundra reverted to being a single-member electorate in 1928, and Hoad, as the Labor candidate, held off a challenge from the Country Party by 86 votes. He was re-elected with a much larger margin in 1930, but was defeated in 1932 by Country Party candidate Bill Ross. He again contested Cootamundra in 1935 and 1938, but was narrowly defeated by Ross on both occasions.

Later in life, Hoad owned property in Junee and a grazing property at Ulandera. He died at Junee in 1944, and was buried in Junee Cemetery.

New South Wales Legislative Assembly
Preceded by James McGirr	Member for Cootamundra; 1925–1932; Served alongside: Loughlin/none, Main/none	Succeeded by Bill Ross
