= Steph Cooke =

Australian politician

Steph Cooke MP
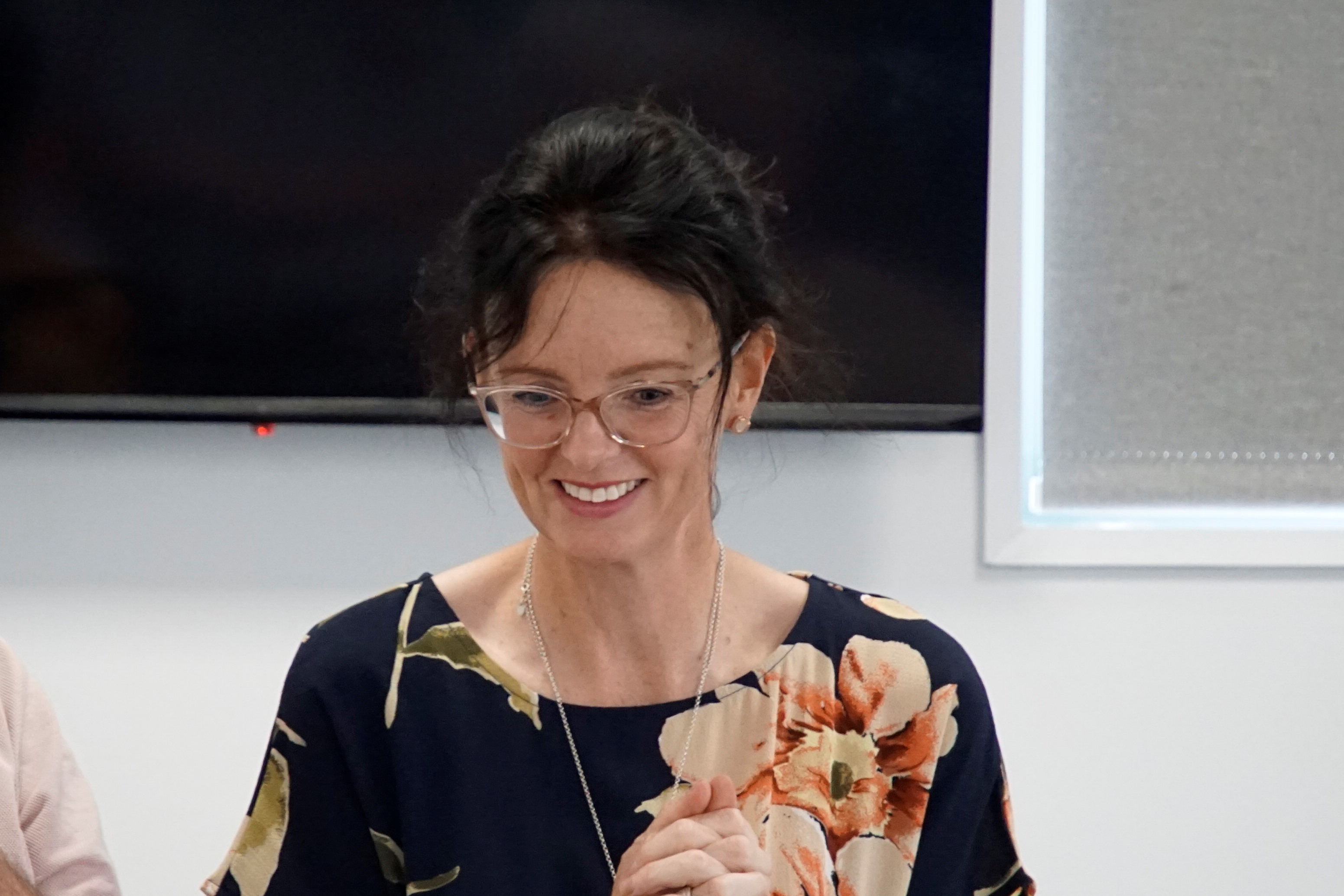
- Cooke at Cootamundra 2026

Minister for Emergency Services and Resilience
- In office 21 December 2021 – 28 March 2023
- Preceded by: David Elliott (as Minister for Police and Emergency Services)
- Succeeded by: Jihad Dib (as Minister for Emergency Services)

Minister for Flood Recovery
- In office 9 March 2022 – 28 March 2023
- Preceded by: Position created
- Succeeded by: Position abolished

Member of the New South Wales Parliament for Cootamundra
- Incumbent
- Assumed office 14 October 2017
- Preceded by: Katrina Hodgkinson

Personal details
- Born: Temora, New South Wales, Australia
- Party: National Party
- Spouse: Keith Duran
- Website: www.stephcooke.com.au

Stephanie Anne Cooke is an Australian politician. Cooke served as the Minister for Emergency Services and Resilience in the Perrottet ministry from December 2021 to March 2023. During the New South Wales floods in February to March 2022, Cooke was additionally appointed Minister for Flood Recovery to oversee the flood recovery. She has been a Nationals member of the New South Wales Legislative Assembly since 14 October 2017, representing Cootamundra since a by-election held to replace Katrina Hodgkinson.

Cooke was a florist before entering politics and ran a business, Native Botanical, with outlets in Cootamundra, Temora and Young. In 2017, her business was recognised as NSW Florist of the Year.

New South Wales Legislative Assembly
Preceded by Katrina Hodgkinson	Member for Cootamundra; 2017–present	Incumbent
Political offices
Preceded by David Elliott as Minister for Police and Emergency Services	Minister for Emergency Services and Resilience; 2021–2023	Succeeded by Jihad Dib as Minister for Emergency Services
New title	Minister for Flood Recovery; 2022–2023	Ministry abolished
