= Bill Ross (Australian politician) =

Australian politician

William Forrest Maxwell Ross (23 February 1888 – 19 March 1966) was an Australian politician.

He was born at Darlington Point to grazier William Eglington Ross and Elizabeth Emily, née Beveridge. After attending Scotch College he became a grazier, working on the family property at Harden from 1903. He served with the 1st Light Horse Brigade from 1915 to 1919 in Palestine and Mesopotamia, attaining the rank of lieutenant. In 1922 he married Elizabeth Gibson; he would later marry Grace Shuttle. He served on the council of the Graziers' Association (1931–40) and was president of the Harden branch, and he was briefly a member of the Farmers' and Settlers' Association of New South Wales in 1936. In 1932 he was elected to the New South Wales Legislative Assembly as the Country Party member for Cootamundra, serving until his defeat in 1941. Ross died at Minto in 1966.

New South Wales Legislative Assembly
Preceded by Ken Hoad	Member for Cootamundra; 1932–1941	Succeeded by Seat abolished
