= Blayney–Demondrille railway line =

Railway line in New South Wales, Australia

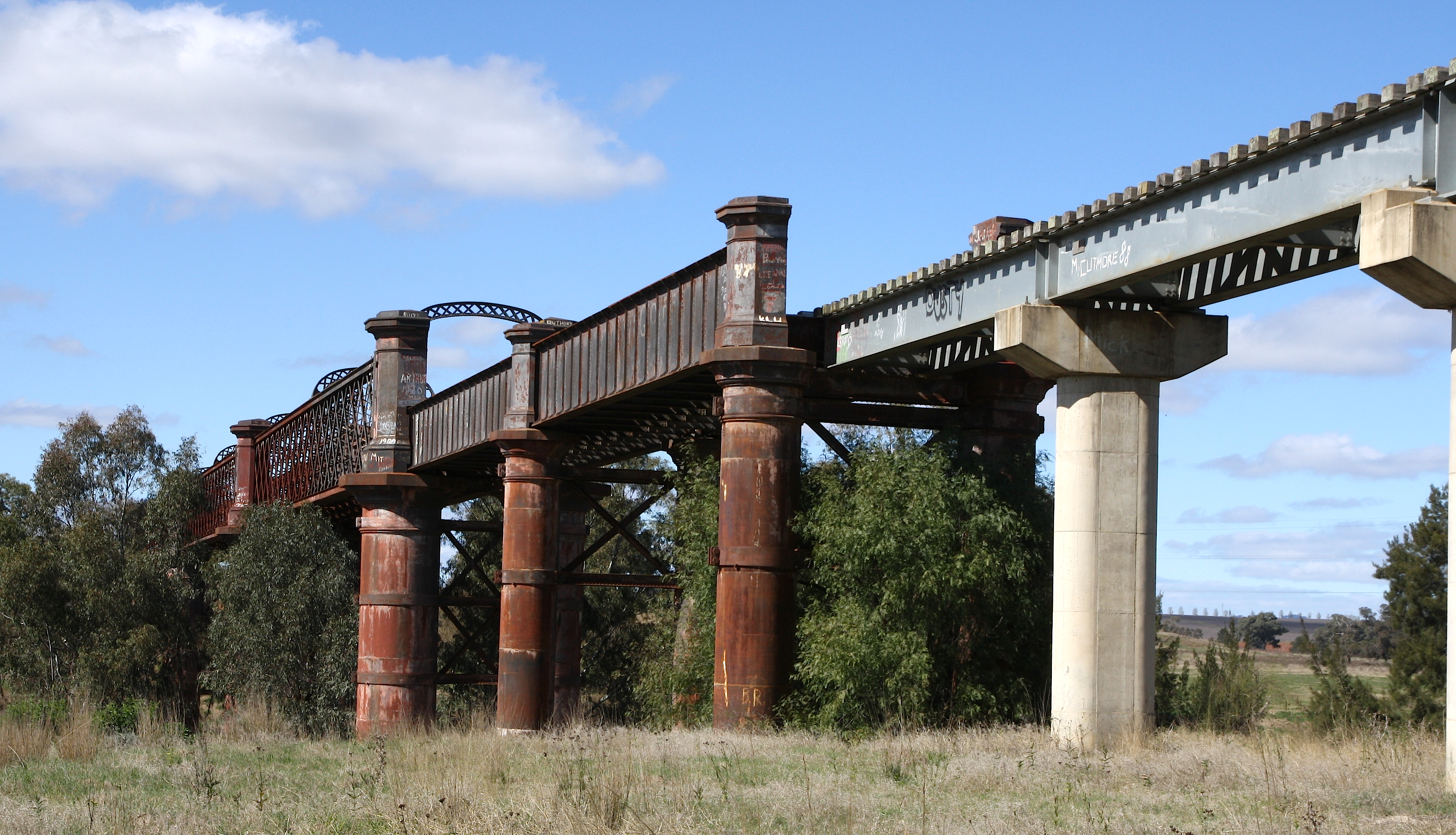
- Bridge over the Lachlan River, opened in 1887

Overview
- Owner: Transport Asset Manager of New South Wales
- Termini: Blayney (north); Demondrille (south-west)

Service
- Operators: Australian Rail Track Corporation (2004–2011); John Holland Rail (since 2011); Lachlan Valley Railway (tourism)

History
- Opened: 26 March 1885

Technical
- Line length: 101 km (63 mi)
- Track gauge: 4 ft 8 1/2 in (1,435 mm) standard gauge

The Blayney–Demondrille railway line is a railway line in New South Wales, Australia. The line is used mainly for grain haulage and is owned by the Transport Asset Manager of New South Wales. However, in 2004 the Australian Rail Track Corporation became responsible for operations over the line. The Lachlan Valley Railway operates heritage trains on a small section of the line at Cowra; it previously also operated general goods trains.

From January 2012, the line was managed by John Holland Rail. Following flooding in 2011 between Cowra and Young, the line remains unusable for most of its length.

== History ==
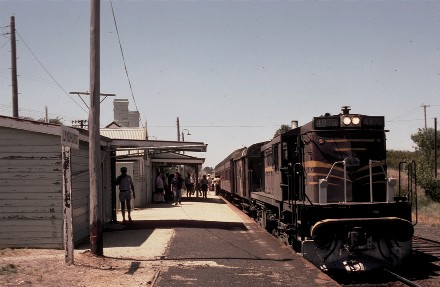
4876 stands at Lyndhurst station with an enthusiast special

Approval was given by the New South Wales Government in April 1881 for the construction of the Blayney–Murrumburrah Railway. The line connects the Main West line at Blayney with the Main South Line at Demondrille, and passes through the towns of Cowra and Young.

The section between Demondrille and Young opened on 26 March 1885. The next section, from Young to Cowra (on the west side of the Lachlan River), saw the first government operated train on 2 November 1886, however the contractor operated trains from May 1886.

The bridge over the river was tested on 25 August 1887 and the line opened to the current station site forthwith. The final section, from Cowra to Blayney opened in August 1887. The section from Blayney to Cowra was closed in late 1999 after a bridge near Holmwood burned down but the line was reopened April 2000.

Finally, between 2007 and 2009 the line was progressively suspended from service due to declining freight volumes, high maintenance costs and safety concerns.

The councils of Blayney, Cowra, Weddin, Harden and Young have strongly supported the re-opening of the 'Cowra Lines', which include the Blayney to Demondrille line and a section of the Grenfell branch line between Koorawatha to Greenethorpe. In mid-2013, Transport for NSW and the Blayney, Cowra, Weddin, Harden and Young councils signed a Memorandum of Understanding to develop a sustainable and integrated regional road and rail freight infrastructure model.

A Registration of Interest process conducted in late 2013 identified that there was market interest in the Cowra Lines from suitably qualified and experienced private sector proponents. As a result, the NSW Government moved to hold an 'open tender' for the Cowra Lines.

On 24 March 2014, the NSW Government opened a Request For Tender process for the Cowra Lines. The tender invited submissions from the private sector to restore, operate and maintain the Cowra Lines on a commercially sustainable basis. The Request For Tender process closed on 25 July 2014. The tender process was completed in April 2015. A comprehensive tender evaluation found that none of the proposals received adequately met the tender criteria. It concluded that there was too much uncertainty in the ability of the tenderers to return the lines to full service and run a commercially sustainable business without significant government support.

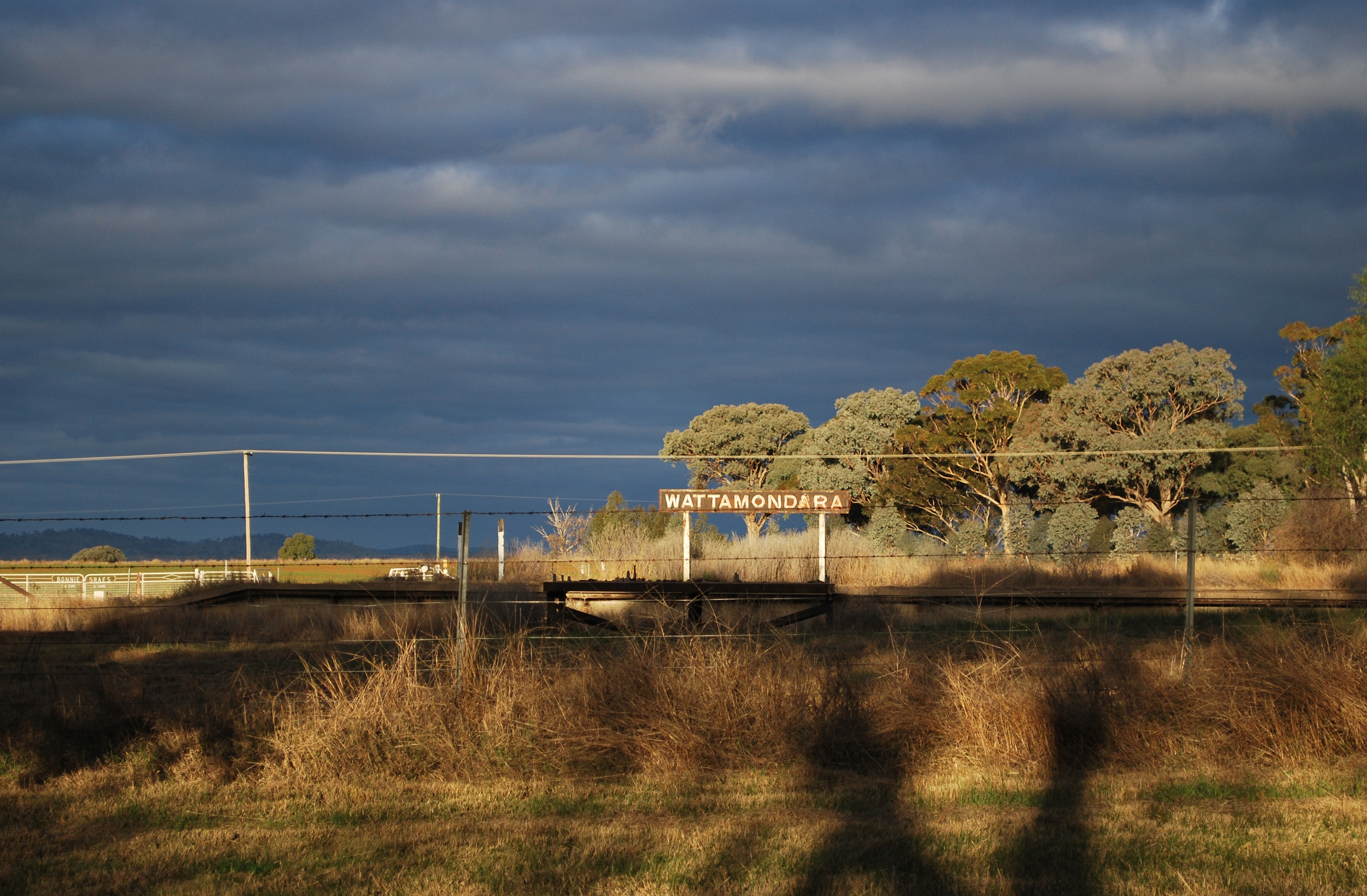
Wattamondara Railway Station.

In 1993, it was written that the Lachlan Valley Railway, which operates from its base in Cowra, could face an uncertain future if the line remained suspended from operation. Following restoration works, in 2022 the society ran a train from its depot into Cowra station for the first time since 2009.

== Branch lines ==
=== Eugowra ===
A railway line branched from Cowra and headed west to the small township of Eugowra. The line opened to Canowindra on 4 July 1910 and to Eugowra on 11 December 1922. It mainly carried grain traffic, but also had a passenger service until 1974.

The line between Cowra and Demondrille was reopened in December 2009 as per a notice in the January 2010 issue of Rail Digest but so far has not been used by the Lachlan Valley Railway. Services are currently suspended and the line is in a poor state and is unlikely to reopen.

In June 2010 the Australian Rail Track Corporation removed three viaducts on the line which were located in Cowra.

=== Grenfell ===
The Grenfell railway line branched from Koorawatha and headed west to the small township of Grenfell. The line opened in 1901. It went through Greenethorpe, Brundah and Mogogong. The line from Grenfell could be built to Quandialla to allow transport minerals such as iron ore, gold and clay, as well as other minerals yet to mined.

== See also ==
- Rail transport in New South Wales
- Crowther railway station
- Young railway station
