= Hilltops Council =

Local government area in New South Wales, Australia

- Local government area
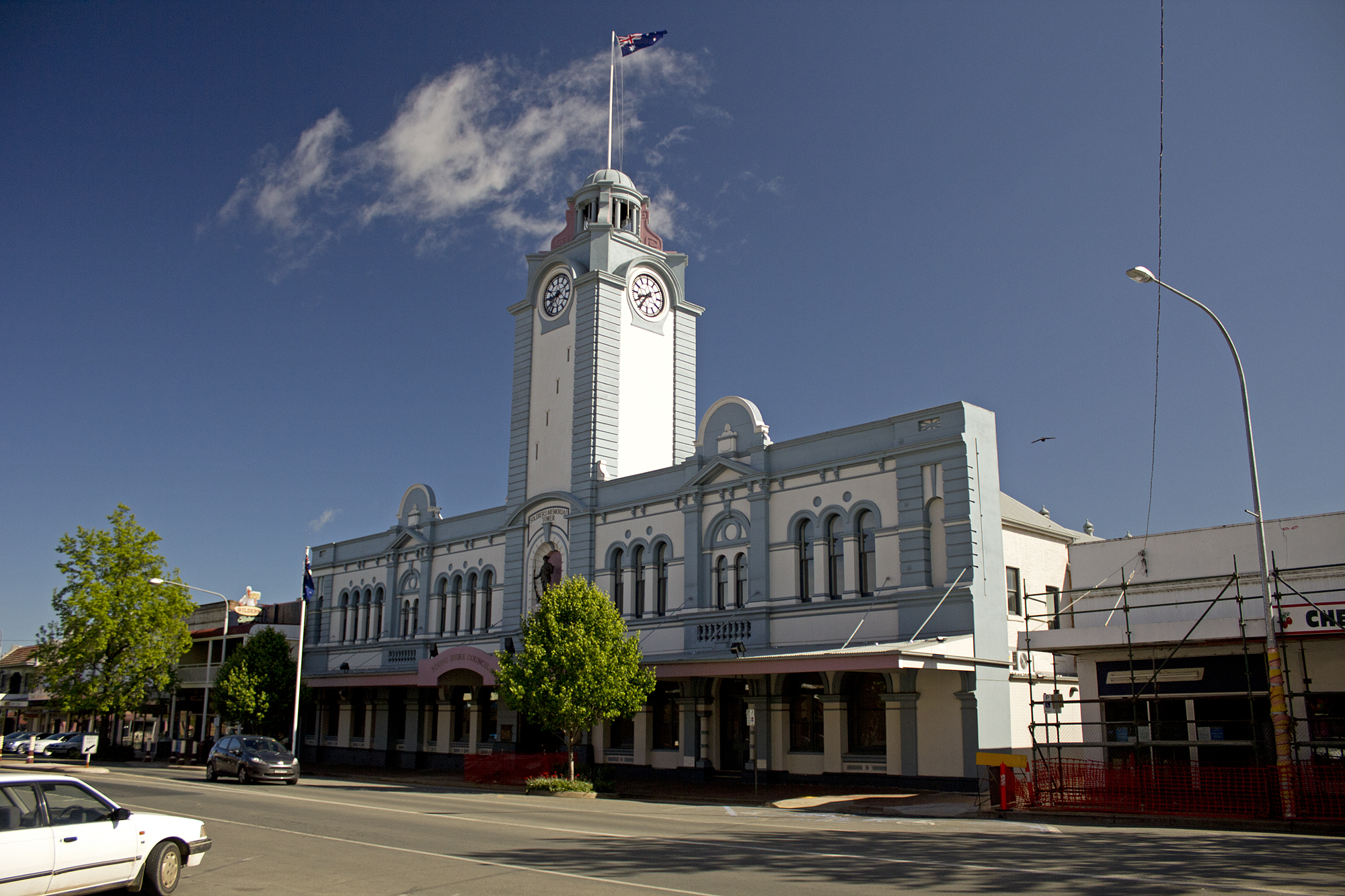
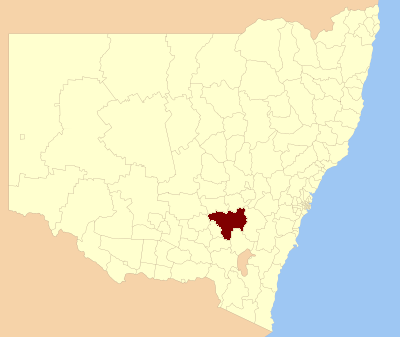
- The Young offices of Hilltops Council Location in New South Wales

- Interactive map of Hilltops Council
- Coordinates: 34°25′S 148°28′E
- Country: Australia
- State: New South Wales
- Region: South Western Slopes
- Established: 12 May 2016
- Council seat: Young, Boorowa, Harden, Wombat

Government
  - Mayor: Brian Ingram (Independent)
  - State electorate: Cootamundra, Goulburn
  - Federal division: Riverina

Area
  - Total: 7,139 km^{2} (2,756 sq mi)

Population
  - Total: 19,254 (2021 census)
  - Density: 2.69702/km^{2} (6.9852/sq mi)
- Website: Hilltops Council
LGAs around Hilltops Council
| Bland, Weddin | Cowra | Upper Lachlan |
| Temora | Hilltops Council | Upper Lachlan |
| Cootamundra-Gundagai | Cootamundra-Gundagai | Yass Valley |

Hilltops Council is a local government area in the South Western Slopes region of New South Wales, Australia. This area was formed on 12 May 2016 from the merger of Boorowa Council, Harden Shire and Young Shire. The local government area covers much the same area as the Hilltops wine region.

The mayor of Hilltops Council is Brian Ingram, an independent, and was elected unopposed after the most recent election held on 9 September 2024.

== Main towns and villages ==
The largest town in Hilltops Council is Young. The other major urban centres are Boorowa, Murrumburrah and Harden. Other towns and localities in the Council include Bendick Murrell, Berremangra, Bribbaree, Frogmore, Galong, Godfreys Creek, Hovells Creek, Jugiong, Kingsvale, Koorawatha, Maimuru, Milvale, Monteagle, Mount Collins, Murringo, Reids Flat, Rugby, Rye Park, Taylors Flat, Thuddungra, Wirrimah, Wombat and Wyangala (part).

== Demographics ==
Selected historical census data for Hilltops local government area
| Census year | | 2016 |
|---|---|---|
| Population | Estimated residents on census night | 18,498 |
| Population | LGA rank in terms of size within New South Wales | |
| Population | % of New South Wales population | 0.25% |
| Population | % of Australian population | nom% |
| Population | Estimated ATSI population on census night | 819 |
| Population | % of ATSI population to residents | 4.40% |
| Cultural and language diversity | | |
| Ancestry, top responses | Australian | 35.5% |
| Ancestry, top responses | English | 30.8% |
| Ancestry, top responses | Irish | 11.1% |
| Ancestry, top responses | Scottish | 6.9% |
| Ancestry, top responses | German | 2.7% |
| Language, top responses (other than English) | Arabic | 1.1% |
| Language, top responses (other than English) | Italian | 0.2% |
| Language, top responses (other than English) | Mandarin | 0.2% |
| Language, top responses (other than English) | Serbian | 0.2% |
| Language, top responses (other than English) | Tagalog | 0.1% |
| Religious affiliation | | |
| Religious affiliation, top responses | Catholic | 34.4% |
| Religious affiliation, top responses | Anglican | 25.9% |
| Religious affiliation, top responses | No religion, so described | 15.7% |
| Religious affiliation, top responses | Not stated | 8.4% |
| Religious affiliation, top responses | Uniting Church | 4.6% |
| Median weekly incomes | | |
| Personal income | Median weekly personal income | A$538 |
| Personal income | % of Australian median income | 0.81% |
| Family income | Median weekly family income | A$1,261 |
| Family income | % of Australian median income | 0.73% |
| Household income | Median weekly household income | A$976 |
| Household income | % of Australian median income | 0.68% |

== Council ==
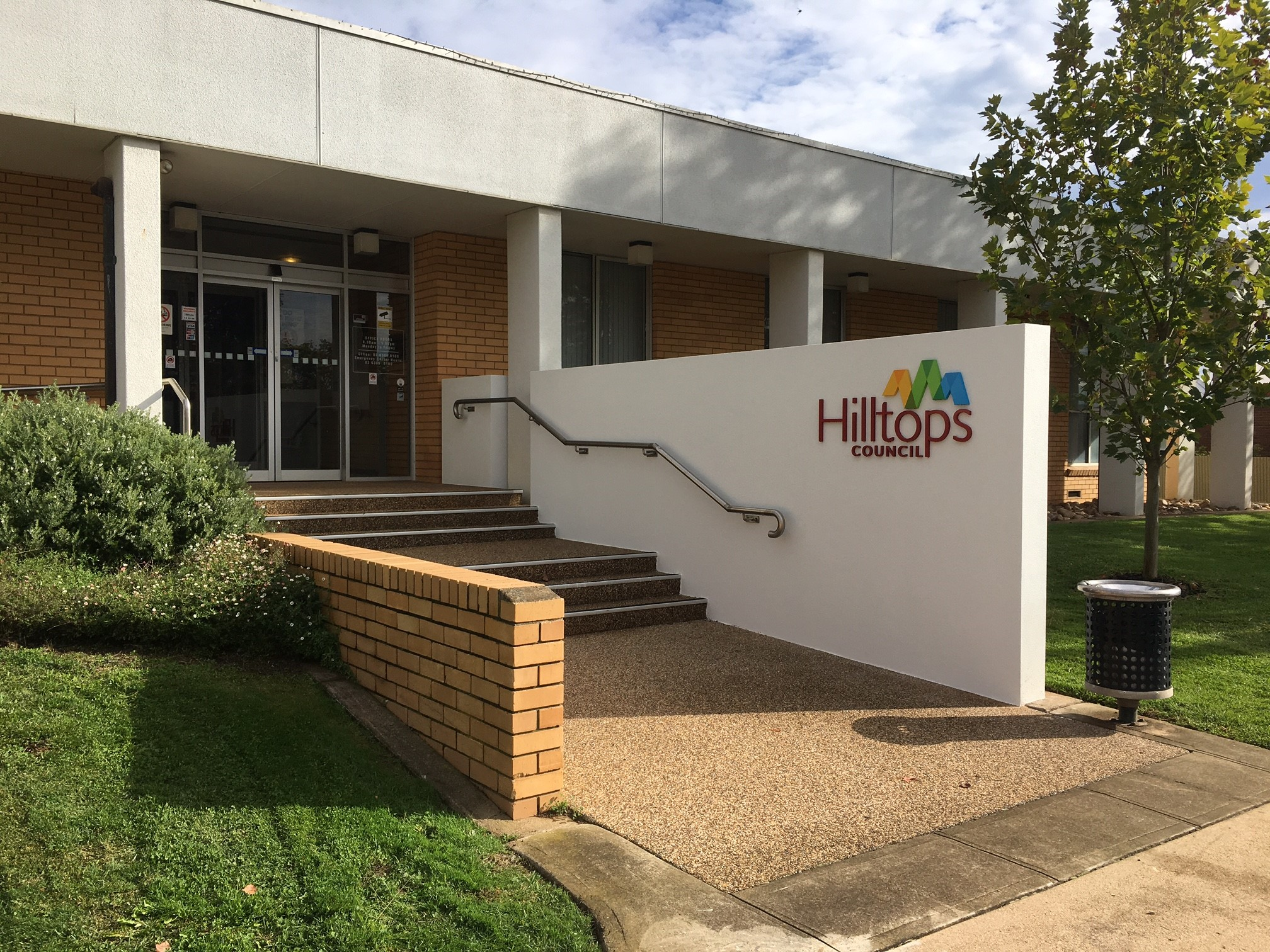
Hilltops Council offices in Harden

=== Current composition and election method ===
Hilltops Council is composed of eleven councillors elected proportionally as a single ward. All councillors are elected for a fixed four-year term of office. The mayor is elected by the councillors at the first meeting of the council.

The current council, elected on 4 December 2021, is:

| Councillor | Party | Notes |
|---|---|---|
| John Piper | Independent | |
| Margaret Roles | Independent | Mayor |
| Tony Hewson | Independent | |
| Tony Flanery | | |
| Alison Foreman | Independent | Deputy Mayor |
| Greg Armstrong | Independent | |
| Joanne Mackay | | |
| Matthew Stadtmiller | | |
| Brian Ingram | Independent | |
| Mary Dodd | Independent | |
| Patrick Fitzgerald | Independent | |

== Election results ==
=== 2024 ===
2024 New South Wales local elections: Hilltops
| Party | Candidate | Votes | % | ±% |
|---|---|---|---|---|
| Independent | Brian Ingram (elected) | 1,740 | 15.8 | +6.8 |
| Independent | Neil Langford (elected) | 1,612 | 14.7 | |
| Independent | Matthew Stadtmiller (elected) | 1,271 | 11.6 | −1.5 |
| Independent | Alison Foreman (elected) | 959 | 8.7 | −7.3 |
| Independent | Jake Davis (elected) | 951 | 8.6 | |
| Independent | Tony Flanery (elected) | 884 | 8.0 | −0.8 |
| Independent | Joanne Mackay (elected) | 525 | 4.8 | −3.1 |
| Independent | James Blackwell (elected) | 521 | 4.7 | |
| Independent | Mary Dodd (elected) | 479 | 4.4 | −0.8 |
| Independent | Abdullah Sultan | 435 | 4.0 | |
| Independent | Michelle Gallo (elected) | 418 | 3.8 | |
| Independent | Patrick Fitzgerald | 349 | 3.2 | −0.9 |
| Independent | Fiona Douglas (elected) | 315 | 2.9 | |
| Independent | Jennifer Smith | 253 | 2.3 | |
| Independent | Michael Skillen | 239 | 2.2 | |
| Independent | Brandon Douglas | 51 | 0.5 | |
| Total formal votes | | 11,002 | 91.9 | |
| Informal votes | | 972 | 8.1 | |
| Turnout | | 11,974 | 82.1 | |

=== 2021 ===
2021 New South Wales local elections: Hilltops
| Party | Candidate | Votes | % | ±% |
|---|---|---|---|---|
| Independent | Alison Foreman (elected) | 1,769 | 16.1 | |
| Independent | Margaret Roles (elected) | 1,450 | 13.2 | |
| Independent | Matthew Stadtmiller (elected) | 1,436 | 13.0 | |
| Independent | Brian Ingram (elected) | 999 | 9.1 | |
| Independent | John Piper (elected) | 952 | 8.6 | |
| Independent | Joanne Mackay (elected) | 869 | 7.9 | |
| Independent | Tony Flanery (elected) | 798 | 7.2 | |
| Independent | Mary Dodd (elected) | 567 | 5.1 | |
| Independent | Tony Hewson (elected) | 482 | 4.4 | |
| Independent | Greg Armstrong (elected) | 462 | 4.2 | |
| Independent | Patrick Fitzgerald (elected) | 452 | 4.1 | |
| Independent | John Horton | 413 | 3.7 | |
| Independent | John Niven | 372 | 3.4 | |
| Total formal votes | | 11,021 | 93.3 | |
| Informal votes | | 788 | 6.7 | |
| Turnout | | 11,809 | 82.5 | |

== See also ==
- Local government areas of New South Wales
