= Katrina Hodgkinson =

Australian politician

The Honourable Katrina Hodgkinson JP
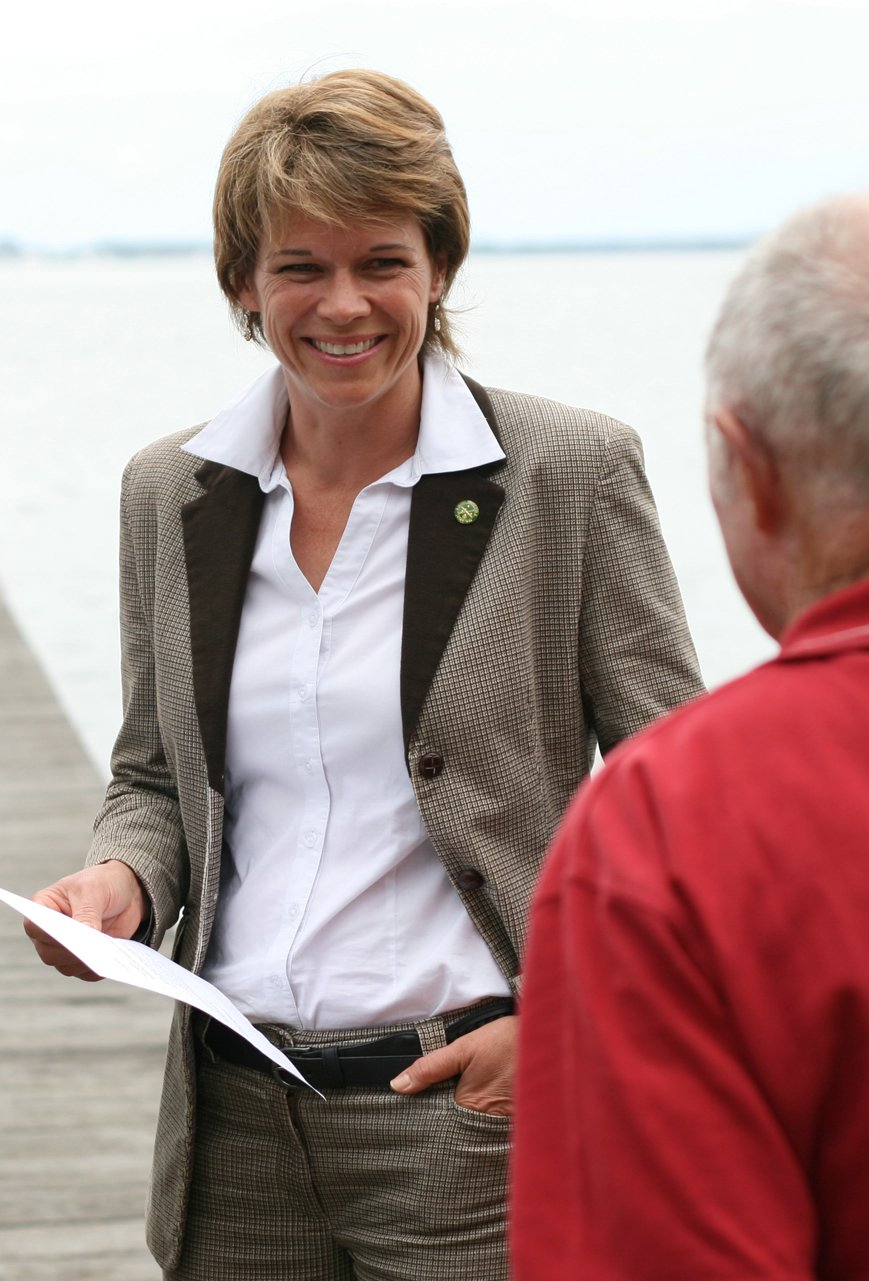

Member of the New South Wales Parliament for Cootamundra
- In office 28 March 2015 – 1 September 2017
- Preceded by: Seat re-established
- Succeeded by: Steph Cooke

Member of the New South Wales Parliament for Burrinjuck
- In office 27 March 1999 – 6 March 2015
- Preceded by: Alby Schultz
- Succeeded by: Seat abolished

Minister for Primary Industries
- In office 3 April 2011 – 6 March 2015
- Premier: Barry O'Farrell; Mike Baird
- Preceded by: Steve Whan
- Succeeded by: Niall Blair

Minister for Small Business
- In office 3 April 2011 – 17 April 2014
- Premier: Barry O'Farrell
- Preceded by: Frank Terenzini
- Succeeded by: Andrew Stoner

Personal details
- Born: Katrina Ann Hodgkinson; 10 March 1966 (age 60) Yass, New South Wales
- Party: National
- Children: 2

Katrina Ann Hodgkinson (born 10 March 1966) is an Australian former politician. She is the former Federal Vice President of the National Party of Australia and a former Member of Parliament. She was a member of the New South Wales Legislative Assembly, representing Cootamundra for The Nationals from 28 March 2015 to 1 September 2017, and Burrinjuck from 27 March 1999 to 27 March 2015.

== Early years and background ==
Hodgkinson was educated at Canberra Girls' Grammar School and Narrabundah College, and Metropolitan Business College of New South Wales. She was an executive officer in the Commonwealth Department of Transport and for Sydney property development companies, becoming Secretary of the Year for the North Sydney region in 1989. She was a Technical and Further Education instructor from 1989 to 1991, owned regional small businesses from 1989 to 1997 and she was Adviser to Senator the Hon Nick Minchin, Special Minister of State and Minister for Industry, Science and Resources from 1997 to 1999.

== Parliamentary career ==
In 1995, Katrina Hodgkinson sought election to the seat of Southern Highlands in a three-cornered-contest. Despite receiving the highest primary vote, The Nationals were defeated on preferences. In 1998 Alby Schultz, then Member for Burrinjuck, resigned from NSW Parliament to contest the seat of Hume. Katrina Hodgkinson was elected to NSW Parliament at the subsequent 1999 election.

Between 2003 and 2011, Katrina Hodgkinson held a range of shadow ministerial responsibilities including Fair Trading and Small Business, Tourism, Major Events, Community Services, Families and Child Safety, Rural Affairs, and Natural Resource Management. In 2007, a substantial redistribution of electorate boundaries saw her constituency base move from Goulburn, Yass and Tumut to Cowra, Cootamundra, Yass and Young.

Following the 2011 state election, Katrina Hodgkinson was appointed NSW's first female Minister for Primary Industries and also as Minister for Small Business.

In 2013 a further statewide electoral redistribution was announced by the NSW Electoral Commission that resulted in a substantial revision of Katrina Hodgkinson's seat of Burrinjuck, including the loss of her home town of Yass, and the seat renamed Cootamundra, with effect from the 2015 NSW State election. At the same time, the neighbouring electoral district of Goulburn was pushed westward to take in portions of the Burrinjuck electorate, including her hometown of Yass.

Katrina Hodgkinson initially announced plans to seek Nationals preselection in Goulburn. This briefly touched off a dispute between the Liberals and Nationals. Ultimately, Hodgkinson dropped plans to challenge Goulburn and contested Cootamundra, which she won easily.

Due to the resignation of Barry O'Farrell as Premier and Deputy Premier Andrew Stoner in 2014 and the subsequent ministerial reshuffle by new Premier Mike Baird and new Deputy Premier and Minister for Racing Troy Grant, in addition to her existing responsibilities as Minister for Primary Industries, Katrina Hodgkinson was appointed Assistant Minister for Tourism and Major Events. She was appointed as NSW first Parliamentary Secretary for Southern NSW in the second Baird ministry following the 2015 state election.

Following the introduction by the Baird-Grant Government in October 2016 of legislation to ban greyhound racing in NSW, Katrina Hodgkinson, with fellow Nationals MPs for the seats of Barwon and Clarence, crossed the floor to vote against the ban. After months of intense public pressure from regional communities, Premier Baird introduced new legislation overturning the greyhound racing ban that he and Grant had introduced, and then retired from State Parliament.

Hodgkinson graduated from the Australian Institute of Company Directors in 2015, and as a Master of Business Administration through the Australian Institute of Business in 2017. On 31 July 2017, she announced her intention to retire from the NSW Parliament effective 1 September 2017, resulting in a by-election for the seat of Cootamundra, which was comfortably retained by the Nationals.

Hodgkinson was elected Federal Vice President of the National Party of Australia in August 2018.

At the 2019 federal election, Katrina Hodgkinson contested the seat of Gilmore. She increased The Nationals margin in the seat by over 14%.

Katrina Hodgkinson is currently a Company Director, on the Boards of the Australian Rail Track Corporation (ARTC), Shake It Up Australia Foundation (in association with the Michael J Fox Foundation for Parkinson’s Research), and she is Chair of NSW Small Business Advisory, Realise Business.

New South Wales Legislative Assembly
District re-established	Member for Cootamundra; 2015–2017	Succeeded by Steph Cooke
Preceded by Alby Schultz	Member for Burrinjuck; 1999–2015	District abolished
Political offices
Preceded by Steve Whan	Minister for Primary Industries; 2011–2015	Succeeded by Niall Blair
Preceded by Frank Terenzini	Minister for Small Business; 2011–2014	Succeeded by Andrew Stoner
New title	Assistant Minister for Tourism and Major Events; 2014	Succeeded by John Barilaro as Minister for Regional Tourism
