= Koorawatha =

Koorawatha New South Wales
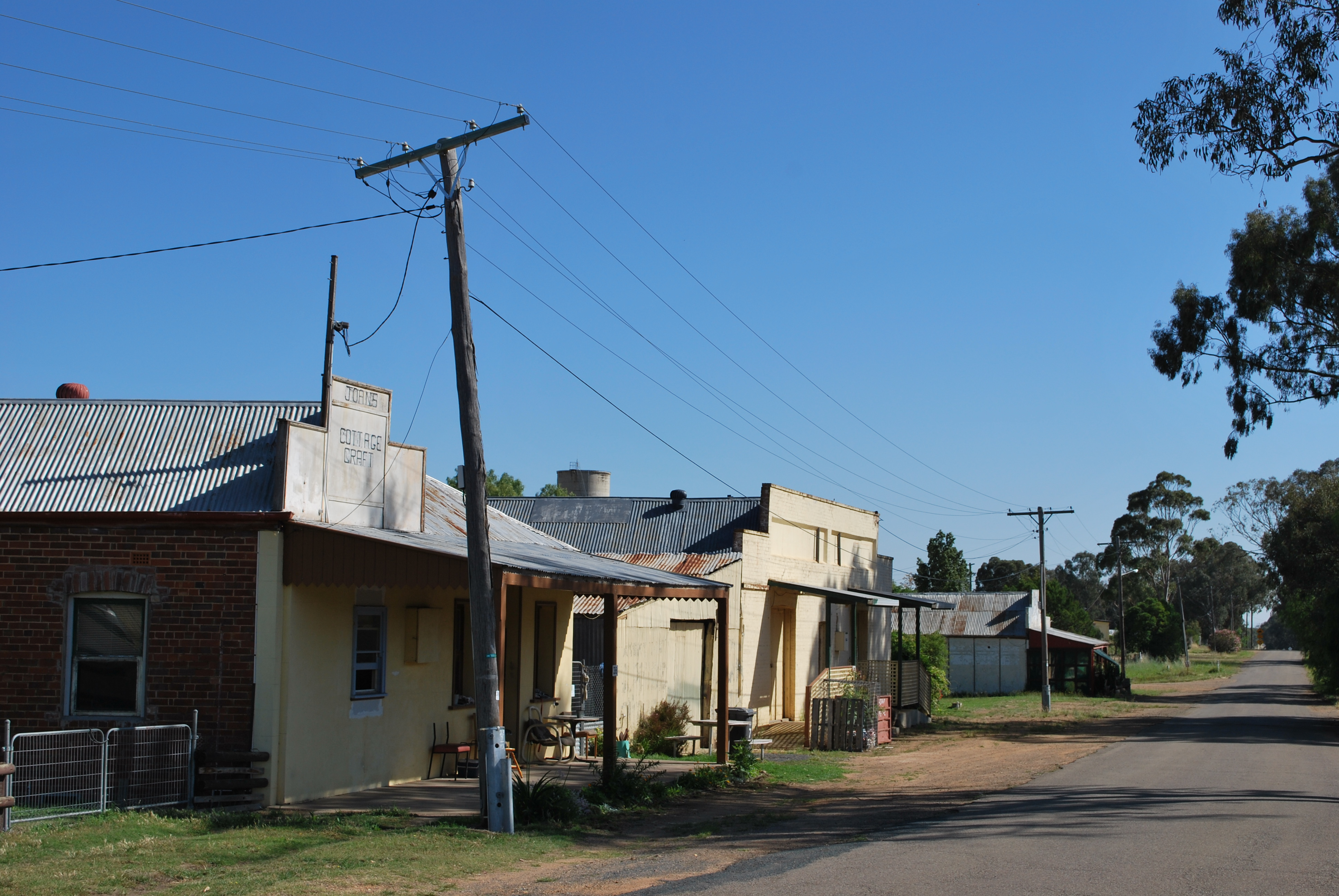
- Old shops at Koorawatha

- Coordinates: 34°2′18″S 148°33′14″E
- Population: 273 (UCL 2021)
- Postcode(s): 2807
- Location: 339 km (211 mi) W of Sydney; 186 km (116 mi) N of Canberra; 134 km (83 mi) SW of Bathurst; 28 km (17 mi) SW of Cowra; 44 km (27 mi) NE of Young
- LGA(s): Hilltops Council
- State electorate(s): Cootamundra
- Federal division(s): Riverina

Koorawatha is a town in the South West Slopes region of New South Wales, Australia, on the Olympic Highway between Cowra and Young. It was once a large and thriving centre of activity but now has only a hotel and a cafe.

The Koorawatha Hotel has a long narrow bar and keen-eyed patrons may notice that there is a rather elongated-looking wombat on top of the ‘fridge.

At the 2016 census, Koorawatha had a population of 427, which had grown to 450 at the 2021 census.

The town's name is derived from an Aboriginal word for "pine trees".

Koorawatha is located near the Illunie Range which contains the Koorawatha Nature Reserve, an important tract of virgin bushland. Keen bird watchers may find much to reward them at the Koorawatha Falls area at the Nature Reserve.

For several years until recently Koorawatha had its own newsletter, the "Koora Chat", which could be picked up from the Triple J cafe.

The German Greens activist Petra Kelly once owned a building block of land in the centre of the village, which she had never actually visited. The photographer Olive Cotton (1911–2003) lived on a farm near Koorawatha for more than fifty years.

The township is famous for a gun battle between police and the bushranger Ben Hall. On 20 May 1864 Hall, ably assisted by Tom Gordon and Jimmy Dunleavy attempted to hold up the Bang Bang Hotel (demolished in the 1940s) but found themselves involved in a desperate gun battle with two policemen. Hall and his accomplices were forced to retreat.

After this they proceeded to the Bang Bang hotel, and held up all those on the front verandah, instructing them to stay where they were. Two constables Scott and McNamara were at the stables tending their horses and upon seeing this drew their pistols. John Gilbert, the notorious bushranger who was part of Hall's gang opened fire and fired three shots at the constables who returned fire, advancing towards the mounted bushrangers as they fired forcing Mount and Gilbert to retreat. While McNamara kept Mount and Gilbert at bay, Scott took careful aim at Hall as he galloped away - and fired. The bullet struck his hat knocking it from his head. Gilbert and Mount galloped after Hall abandoning the robbery.

At the site of the gun battle there is a sign where the old Bang Bang Hotel used to be. It is inconspicuously located by a peppercorn tree in the township, about half a kilometre west from the Olympic Highway.

"The Decline of the North", a poem by Peter Porter, makes reference to rustic scenes near Koorawatha, which he visited in the mid-1970s with his two daughters, Katherine and Jane. The phrase "armoured lizards" refers to Tiliqua rugosa subsp. asper, a docile, endemic, easily caught species, otherwise known by their common name of Eastern shingleback.

== Notable residents ==
- Olive Cotton, photographer and teacher
