= Electoral district of Cootamundra =

Australian state-level electoral district

Cootamundra New South Wales—Legislative Assembly
- Interactive map of district boundaries from the 2023 state election
- State: New South Wales
- Dates current: 1904–1941; 2015–present
- MP: Steph Cooke
- Party: National Party
- Namesake: Cootamundra, New South Wales
- Electors: 56,016 (2023)
- Area: 37,288.9 km^{2} (14,397.3 sq mi)
- Demographic: Rural
Electorates around Cootamundra:
Barwon	Orange	Bathurst
Murray	Cootamundra	Goulburn
Albury	Wagga Wagga	Wagga Wagga

Cootamundra is an electoral district of the Legislative Assembly in the Australian state of New South Wales.

Cootamundra is a regional electorate encompassing the local government areas of Bland Shire, Narrandera Shire, Coolamon Shire, Temora Shire, Junee Shire, Weddin Shire, Cowra Shire, Hilltops Council and Cootamundra-Gundagai Regional Council.

== History ==
Cootamundra first existed as an electorate from 1904 to 1941 and elected one member between 1904 and 1920 and between 1927 and 1941. It was created in the 1904 re-distribution of electorates following the 1903 New South Wales referendum, which required the number of members of the Legislative Assembly to be reduced from 125 to 90. It consisted of part of The Murrumbidgee, and parts of the abolished seats of Gundagai, Wagga Wagga and Young.

In 1920, with the introduction of proportional representation, it absorbed Burrangong and Yass and elected three members. Proportional representation was abandoned in 1927 and Young and Temora, were separated from it and Cootamundra reverted to being a single member electorate. It was abolished in 1941.

Cootamundra was recreated for the 2015 state election, combining the western part of the abolished district of Burrinjuck with the eastern part of the abolished district of Murrumbidgee.

== Members for Cootamundra ==
Single-member (1904–1920)
Member	Party	Term						
William Holman	Labor	1904–1917						
William Holman	Nationalist	1917–1920						
Three members (1920–1927)
Member	Party	Term	Member	Party	Term	Member	Party	Term
Greg McGirr	Labor	1920–1922	Peter Loughlin	Labor	1920–1926	Hugh Main	Progressive	1920–1925
James McGirr	Labor	1922–1925	Peter Loughlin	Labor	1920–1926	Hugh Main	Progressive	1920–1925
Ken Hoad	Labor	1925–1927	Peter Loughlin	Labor	1920–1926	Hugh Main	Country	1925–1927
Ken Hoad	Labor	1925–1927	Peter Loughlin	Independent	1926–1927	Hugh Main	Country	1925–1927
Single-member (1927–1941)
Member	Party	Term						
Ken Hoad	Labor	1927–1932						
Bill Ross	Country	1932–1941						
Single-member (2015–present)
Member	Party	Term						
Katrina Hodgkinson	National	2015–2017						
Steph Cooke	National	2017–present						

== Election results ==
2023 New South Wales state election: Cootamundra
Party	Candidate	Votes	%	±%
National	Steph Cooke	34,470	70.6	+9.4
Labor	Chris Dahlitz	6,566	13.4	−2.3
Shooters, Fishers, Farmers	Jake Cullen	4,209	8.6	−7.0
Greens	Jeffrey Passlow	1,198	2.5	−0.4
Independent	Robert Young	1,113	2.3	+2.3
Independent	Brian Fisher	674	1.4	+1.4
Sustainable Australia	Chris O'Rourke	618	1.3	−0.1
Total formal votes		48,848	97.7	+0.4
Informal votes		1,143	2.3	−0.4
Turnout		49,991	89.2	−2.9
Two-party-preferred result
National	Steph Cooke	36,446	82.1	+5.5
Labor	Chris Dahlitz	7,959	17.9	−5.5
National hold		Swing	+5.5	
