= Berremangra =

- Town
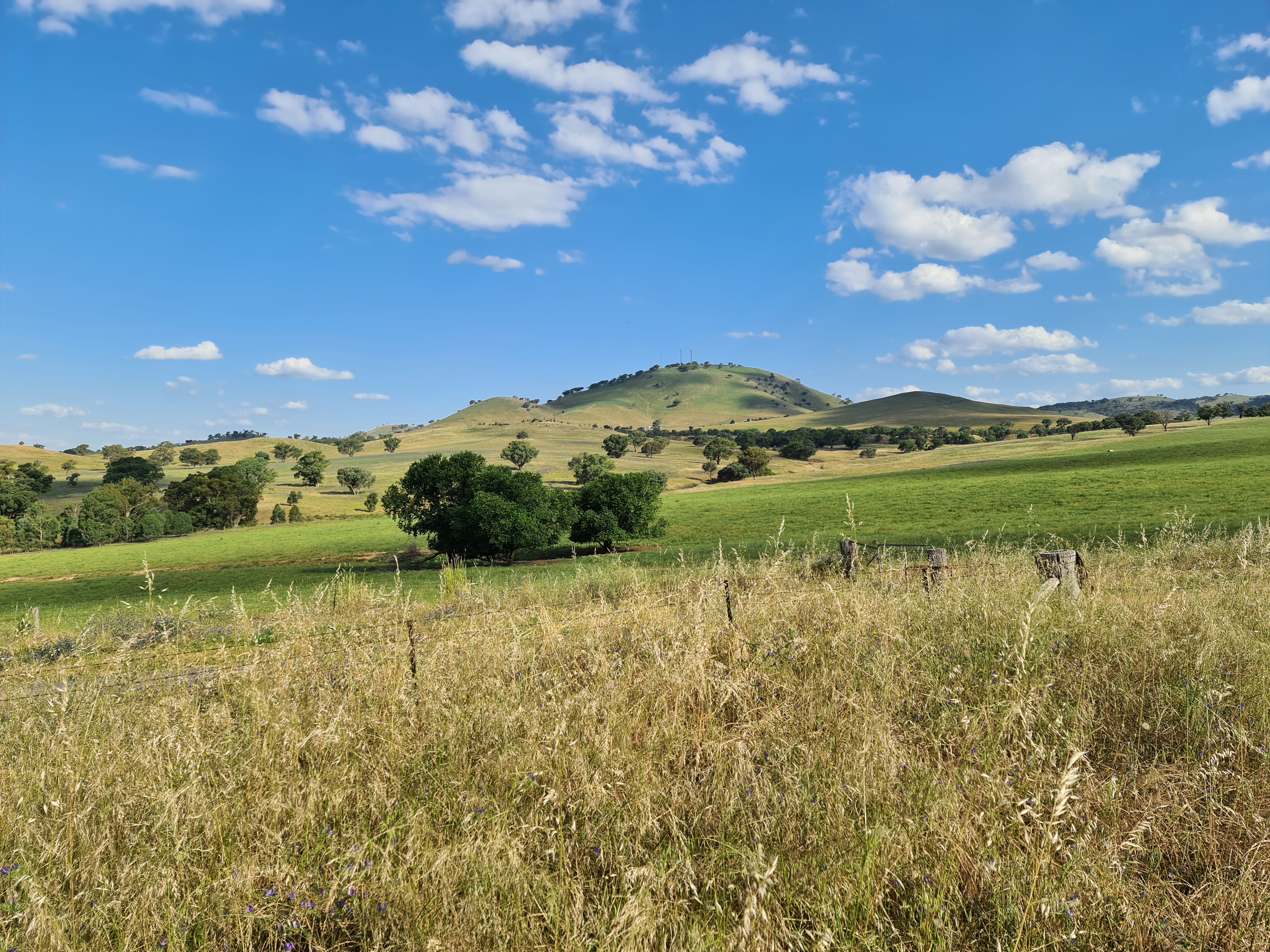
- Berremangra Hill in 2020

- Coordinates: 34°47′55″S 148°28′4″E
- Country: Australia
- State: New South Wales
- Region: South West Slopes
- LGA: Hilltops Council
- Location: 45 km (28 mi) W of Yass; 105 km (65 mi) NW of Canberra; 320 km (200 mi) SW of Sydney; 55 km (34 mi) ENE of Gundagai

Government
  - State electorate: Cootamundra
  - Federal division: Riverina
- Elevation: 255 m (837 ft)

Population
  - Total: 87 (SAL 2021)
- Postcode: 2582
- County: Harden
- Parish: Coppabella
Localities around Berremangra
McMahons Reef	Galong	Binalong
Jugiong	Berremangra	Bookham
Gobarralong	Adjungbilly	Burrinjuck

Berremangra is a locality in the Hilltops Council, New South Wales, Australia. It is on both sides of the Hume Highway about 45 km west of Yass.

At the 2016 census, it had a population of 81, which had grown to 87 in 2021.

Berremangra had a public school described as a "provisional school" from 1872 to 1892, from 1905 to 1913 and from 1919 to 1920. It had a "half-time" school from 1913 to 1915, sharing its teacher with Bookham. It had a public school from 1959 to 1968.
