= Harden County =

Harden
- Cadastral division
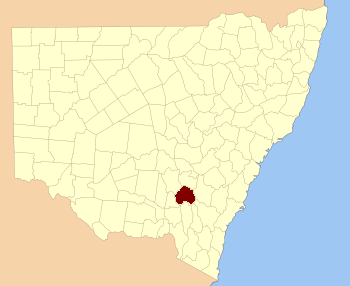
- Location in New South Wales
- Country: Australia
- State: New South Wales
Lands administrative divisions around Harden
Bland	Monteagle	King
Clarendon	Harden	King
Wynyard	Buccleuch	Murray

Harden County is one of the 141 cadastral divisions of New South Wales. It contains the town of Harden.

The origin of the name of Harden is unknown.

== Parishes within this county ==
A full list of parishes found within this county; their current local government area (LGA) and mapping coordinates to the approximate centre of each location is as follows:

Parish	LGA	Coordinates
Beggan Beggan	Hilltops Council	34°39′54″S 148°21′04″E
Binalong	Yass Valley Council	34°39′54″S 148°38′04″E
Birrema	Hilltops Council	34°50′54″S 148°28′04″E
Bobbara	Hilltops Council	34°34′54″S 148°37′04″E
Bongongolong	Cootamundra-Gundagai Regional Council	34°55′54″S 148°06′04″E
Bookham	Yass Valley Council	34°47′54″S 148°38′04″E
Bowning	Yass Valley Council	34°43′54″S 148°48′04″E
Burra	Cootamundra-Gundagai Regional Council	34°53′54″S 148°00′04″E
Childowla	Yass Valley Council	34°58′54″S 148°36′04″E
Coolac	Cootamundra-Gundagai Regional Council	34°58′54″S 148°11′04″E
Cooney	Cootamundra-Gundagai Regional Council	34°44′54″S 148°12′04″E
Cootamundra	Cootamundra-Gundagai Regional Council	34°37′54″S 147°00′04″E
Coppabella	Hilltops Council	34°44′54″S 148°30′04″E
Cowcumbala	Cootamundra-Gundagai Regional Council	34°43′54″S 148°04′04″E
Cullinga	Cootamundra-Gundagai Regional Council	34°36′54″S 147°10′04″E
Cumbamurra	Hilltops Council	34°37′54″S 148°26′04″E
Cunjegong	Cootamundra-Gundagai Regional Council	34°42′54″S 147°57′04″E
Cunningar	Hilltops Council	34°31′54″S 148°26′04″E
Cunningham	Hilltops Council	34°46′54″S 148°21′04″E
Currawong	Hilltops Council	34°27′54″S 148°22′04″E
Demondrille	Hilltops Council	34°30′54″S 148°14′04″E
Douglas	Hilltops Council	34°27′54″S 148°30′04″E
Eubindal	Yass Valley Council	34°36′54″S 148°42′04″E
Galong	Harden Shire	34°32′54″S 148°31′04″E
Gobarralong	Cootamundra-Gundagai Regional Council	34°54′54″S 148°16′04″E
Gooramma	Hilltops Council	34°30′54″S 148°34′04″E
Harden	Hilltops Council	34°37′54″S 148°33′04″E
Illalong	Yass Valley Council	34°41′54″S 148°45′04″E
Jindalee	Cootamundra-Gundagai Regional Council	34°33′54″S 147°03′04″E
Jugiong	Hilltops Council	34°47′54″S 148°21′04″E
Mooney Mooney	Cootamundra-Gundagai Regional Council	34°50′54″S 148°12′04″E
Moppity	Young Shire	34°22′54″S 148°23′04″E
Murrimboola	Hilltops Council	34°31′54″S 148°22′04″E
Muttama	Cootamundra-Gundagai Regional Council	34°45′54″S 148°00′04″E
Mylora	Yass Valley Council	34°43′54″S 148°38′04″E
Nubba	Hilltops Council	34°28′54″S 148°10′04″E
Nurung	Hilltops Council	34°29′54″S 148°34′04″E
Talmo	Yass Valley Council	34°52′54″S 148°36′04″E
Wallendoon	Cootamundra-Gundagai Regional Council	34°32′54″S 147°10′04″E
Wambat	Hilltops Council	34°28′54″S 148°15′04″E
Wilkie	Hilltops Council	34°24′54″S 148°16′04″E
Woolgarlo	Yass Valley Council	34°52′54″S 148°43′04″E
