= Bongongolong =

Bongongolong New South Wales
- Coordinates: 34°54′S 148°03′E
- Postcode(s): 2722
- Location: 391 km (243 mi) WSW of Sydney; 17 km (11 mi) NW of Gundagai
- LGA(s): Cootamundra-Gundagai Regional Council

Bongongolong is an Australian district and cadastral parish of rural smallholdings within the bounded locality of Burra Creek of Gundagai Shire in the Riverina region of New South Wales. It is located approximately 17 km (11 mi) north west of Gundagai, within the Jones Creek district. The name was also applied to a former gold-mining settlement, now a ghost town, which also lies within the locality.

== History ==
The area that was later known as Bongongolong lies of the traditional lands of Wiradjuri people. The name, Bongongolong, is very likely a settler rendering of a local language word.

Early European settlers in the area originally used the land for grazing livestock. In 1874 while prospecting for gold between Bongongolong and Coolac, a previously unrecorded meteorite was discovered near the village by local man Thomas McMahon. Development in the area around Bongongolong boomed in the late 19th century with the discovery of gold in Bongongolong Creek in 1879. A public school was established in 1880 and by 1889 a stamping battery was in operation. This attracted national media attention when in August, the manager of the mill was committed for trial for his part in the fraudulent sale of impure smelted gold. By the late 1890s, a community hall and post office had been built at Bongongolong.

The ongoing decline of the town from World War I onwards is evidenced by the closure of the public school for the last time in 1961. Today little remains of the village, with a few farm houses surviving. The street-grid and foundations for a number of community buildings remain visible.

Sometimes the town's name has also been spelled 'Bongongalong', causing some difficulty when reviewing historical documents.

== In literature ==
The poem "Those Names" by Banjo Paterson published in 1895 refers to Bongongolong as an example of place names unique to Australia.
