= Bogolong iron mine and blast furnace =

Coordinates: 34°46′57.7″S 148°38′13.9″E

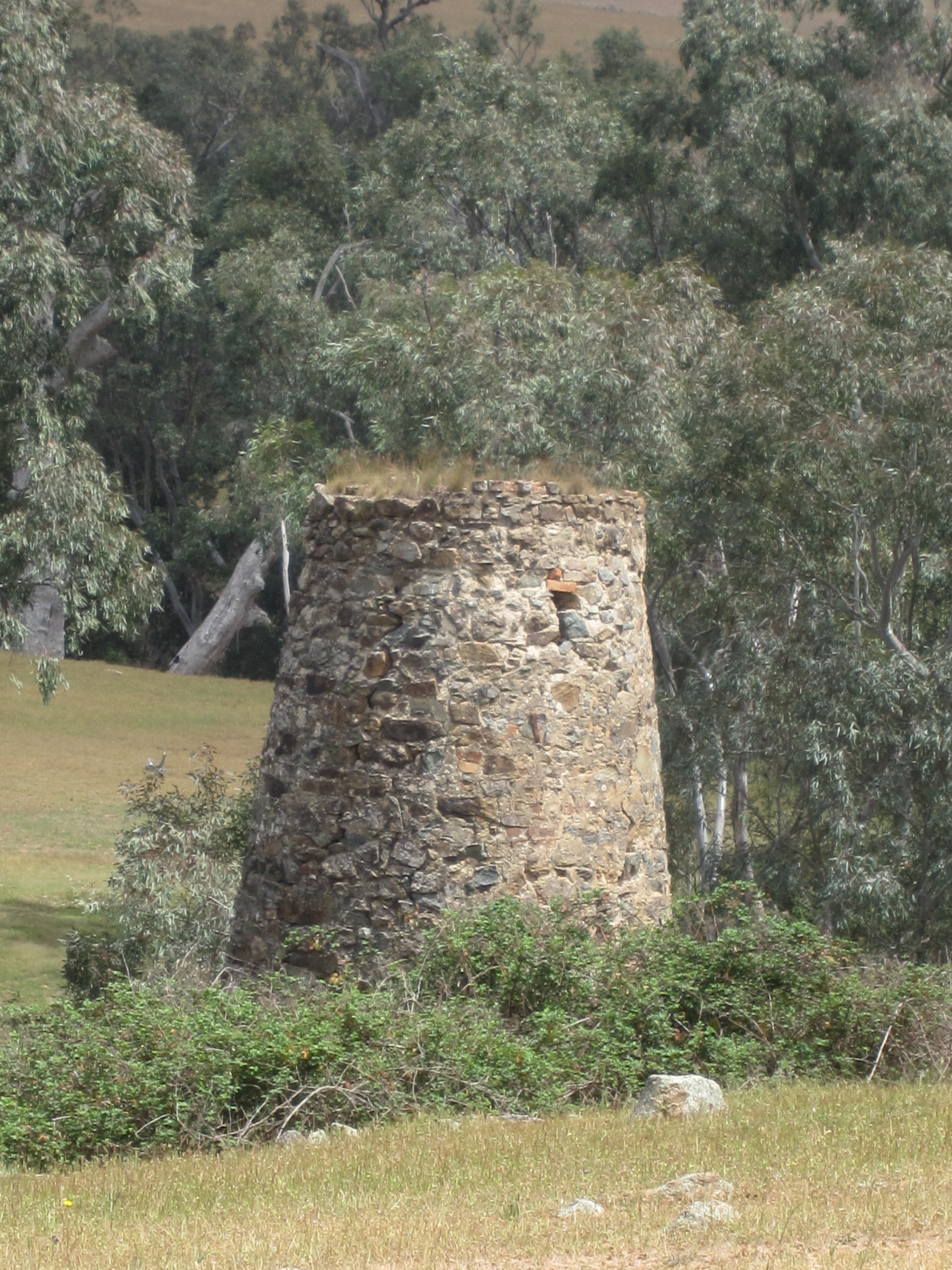
The upper part of Bogolong Blast Furnace ruin, viewed from public land alongside Illalong Road near Bookham, N.S.W. (October 2019)

The Bogolong iron mine and blast furnace is an abandoned iron mining and smelting site, near Bookham, New South Wales, Australia. Located in an area known best for sheep grazing and wool, it has been called Australia's 'forgotten furnace'. In 1874, the blast furnace produced a small amount of pig iron—sufficient to allow its testing—that was smelted from iron ore mined nearby. Plans to operate commercially did not eventuate. It is significant as one of the only three remaining ruins of 19th-Century iron-smelting blast furnaces in Australia, and the only one in New South Wales.

== Location ==
The abandoned iron mine and the ruin of the blast furnace is located alongside a part of Jugiong Creek—a part that was considered part of Bogolong Creek in the 19th-Century—approximately 3 km north of the small settlement of Bookham. The site is on the north side of the first of two 180-degree bends in Jugiong Creek, where the stream changes direction from north to south before resuming its generally northward flow.

== Historical context ==
In the early 1870s there was a sharp increase in the price of iron. This encouraged several iron-smelting ventures in Australia, as locally smelted iron became cost competitive. The high-prices were short-lived; by the late 1870s, imported pig-iron—shipped as ballast in sailing ships—became relatively cheap once again.

During the 19th century, a name for the entire area around Bookham was Bogolong. By the 1870s, the Main Southern Railway was being extended and, by 1876, would reach Binalong, which is approximately 15 km north of the Bogolong site by road, providing access to Sydney and Melbourne.

== Iron ore deposit ==
A 19th-Century analysis of the iron ore gave a result of 52% metallic iron. The ore was hematite. It was reported that the ore was superior to that of iron ore deposit at the Fitzroy Iron Works. The iron ore was described as, "Specular hematite of excellent quality". It was noted that, "The deposit is probably of considerable extent, but its dimensions cannot be correctly ascertained on account of the bed-rock in the vicinity being hidden from view by alluvium".

== History of operation ==
In late 1873, the newly established Bogolong Iron Mining Company (with 4,800 shares and a paid up capital of £1200) took a lease over 200-acres (80-hectares) of land alongside what was then known as Bogolong Creek, now the upstream portion of Jugiong Creek. The owners of the company were two local men from Bookham (Robert Stacey and George Rees), four investors from Albury (Richard Thomas Blackwell, Andrew Edward Heath, Thomas Affleck, and John Charles Gray), and the company's manager, Thomas Barrett Blackwell, from Daylesford.

From July 1873, seven workers were employed in mining iron ore at the site. A blast furnace was constructed adjacent to the mine. Five pigs of iron were cast on 31 March 1874. There were immediate problems caused by the fire-brick lining failing under the intense heat of the furnace. Operations ceased, while repairs were made. Four more pigs were cast on 20 May 1874. All nine of the iron pigs that had been made were sent to Melbourne to ascertain product quality. There was no further iron smelting at the site. Plans for a larger company—the Bogolong Charcoal Ironworks Company—to operate commercially, never eventuated and the furnace and mine were abandoned.

In August 1875, it was reported that English capitalists, after testing a sample of Bogolong ore, were interested in buying the mine, but nothing came of those plans.

== Technology ==
=== Process and equipment ===
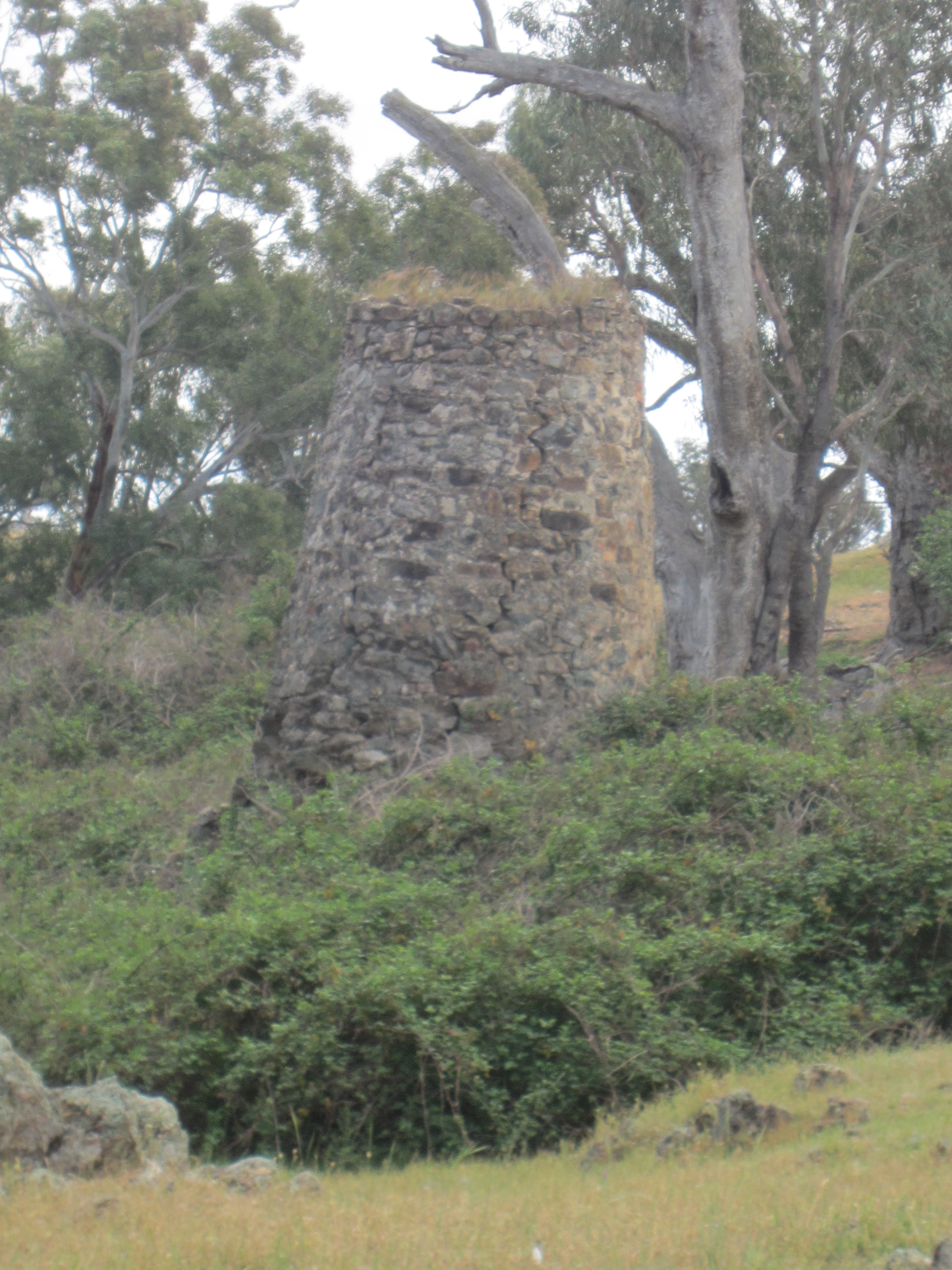
Side-view of Bogolong Blast Furnace, from public land alongside Illalong Road near Bookham, N.S.W. (October 2019). The base of the furnace is hidden by blackberry bushes.

The blast furnace stood 6 metres high, a very small furnace even by the standards of its time. It had a square base, three tuyeres and an arched hearth (on the southern side) through which iron and slag were tapped onto an adjacent casting floor. The outer shell of the furnace was made of local stone. The inner lining was of locally made fire bricks. The space between the outer shell and the inner lining was packed with clay. The fire bricks proved completely unsuitable and failed rapidly once smelting began; that being a reason that so little iron was produced.

The furnace was a cold-blast furnace with the air-blast being provided by a 10 h.p. steam engine driving an 'American blower'. There was a level timber trestle bridge from the top of the slope to the top of the furnace, over which the raw materials were moved by wheelbarrow before being added to the furnace.

The fuel used has been stated to be charcoal, made from locally available hardwood. However, contemporary reports do not make mention of charcoal burning operations at the site. In early March 1874, four tons of coke was shipped to the site via Yass; so it is most likely that the trial smelting used coke as the fuel and reducing agent. Limestone—used as a smelting flux—was mined locally, reportedly from within the company's lease, although its precise source is unknown today.

=== Product quality and cost ===
The iron pigs produced in March and May 1874 were of high quality; when examined in Albury, the first five pigs made were reportedly "far superior to that of the Ilfracombe Iron Mine"—an iron-making venture in Northern Tasmania that had carried out a trial smelting of its ore in Melbourne in 1872. It was reported that the high-quality iron was produced at a cost of under £4 per ton, which at the time was competitive with imported iron.

== Remnants ==
The remnants are on private property and not accessible to the public, but are partially visible from adjoining public land on the western side of Illalong Road, the road between Bookham and Binalong.

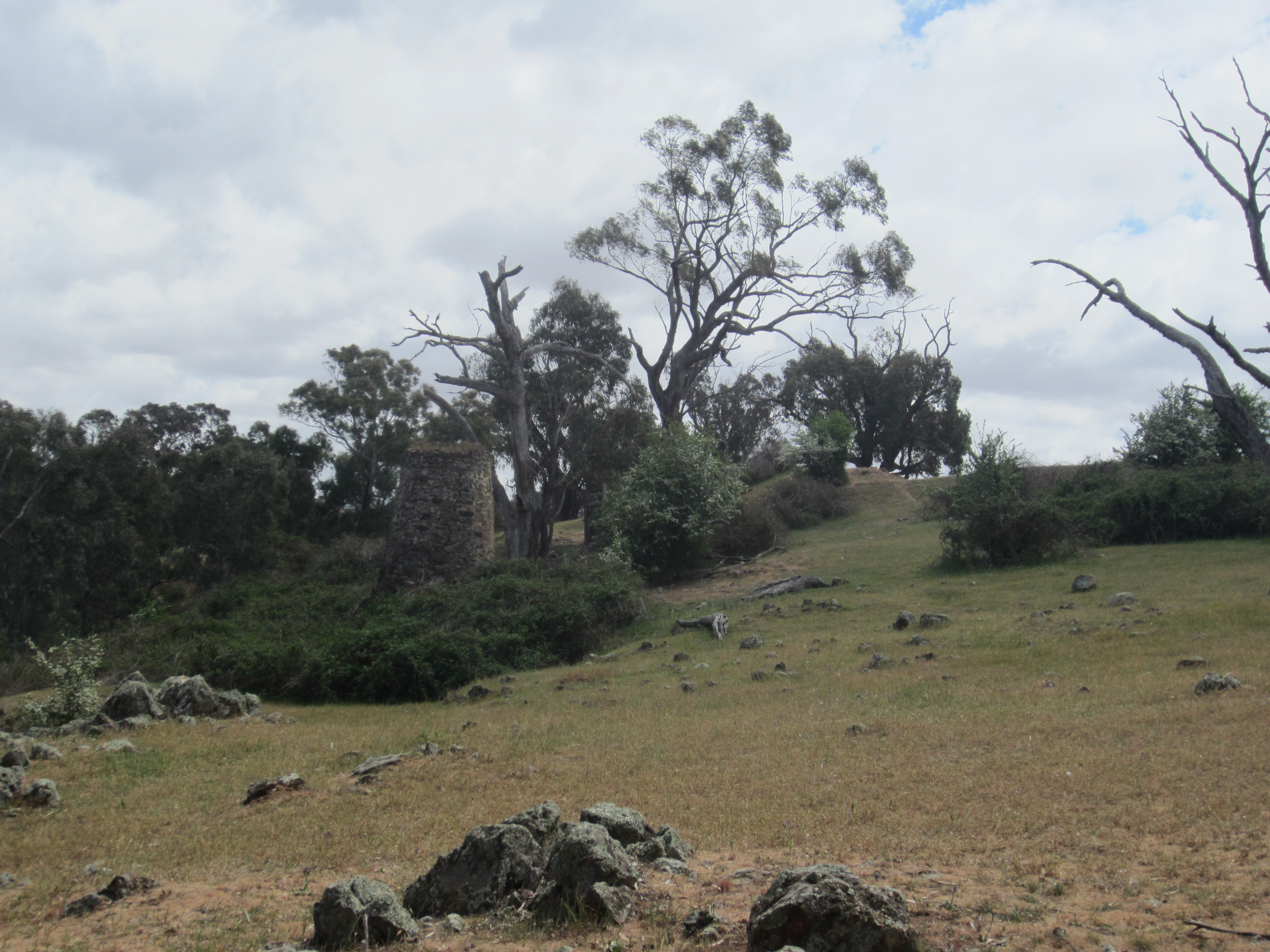
View of the Bogolong mining and smelting site, from public land alongside Illalong Road, near Bookham, N.S.W. (October 2019).

The mine site—an open quarry—extends to the top of a slope. Piles of iron ore and limestone, mined during 1873–1874, remain midway between the mine and the blast furnace site.

The blast furnace ruin, casting floor and some other remnants are nearby on a piece of flat land—a man-made terrace—that is part way down a southward-facing slope that ends at a wide sandy stretch of Jugiong Creek. By 1993, there was nothing remaining of the blowing equipment or other machinery. The outer shell of the furnace ruin was still complete in 1993, but the fire bricks of the inner lining largely had been pilfered over the years. However, since 1993, the ruined structure has become partially overgrown by blackberry bush and some structurally important timber lintels have rotted. By 2010, robbing of stonework from the top of the structure had weakened it structurally, leaving it under threat of collapse. The furnace was still standing in October 2019 (refer to photographs).

The furnace is one of only three remaining ruins of 19th-Century iron-smelting blast furnace structures in Australia and the only one in New South Wales. The site has heritage recognition, but is not being conserved or managed as a heritage site. It remains the 'forgotten furnace'.

== See also ==
- Lal Lal Iron Mine and Smelting Works—another 19th Century blast furnace ruin, located in Victoria.
- Ilfracombe Iron Company—another 19th-Century blast furnace ruin, located in Northern Tasmania.
- Fitzroy Iron Works at Mittagong, N.S.W.—the site of Australia's first commercial iron-smelting and site of the first blast furnace in Australia.
- List of 19th-century iron smelting operations in Australia
