= Talmo (disambiguation) =

Talmo may refer to:

- Talmo, New South Wales, a rural community in Australia
- Talmo, Georgia, a town in Jackson County
- Talmo, Kansas, an unincorporated community in Republic County
- Talmo Oliveira (born 1969), a Brazilian volleyball player
