= Talmo, New South Wales =

Talmo New South Wales
- Coordinates: 34°53′S 148°37′E
- Postcode(s): 2582
- Elevation: 607 m (1,991 ft)
- Location: 12 km (7 mi) from Bookham; 24 km (15 mi) from Jugiong
- LGA(s): Yass Valley Council
- County: Harden
- State electorate(s): Burrinjuck

Talmo is a rural locality in the north eastern part of the Riverina. It is situated by road, about 12 kilometres south of Bookham and 24 kilometres east of Jugiong. Talmo is recorded as a parish/locality in county maps (Parish of Talmo, County of Harden — land/department maps held in NSW collections). In modern times Talmo is mostly large grazing properties (fine-wool sheep country and mixed agriculture). A few homesteads and private properties use “Talmo” as a property name.
