= Cumbamurra, New South Wales =

Civil parish in New South Wales, Australia

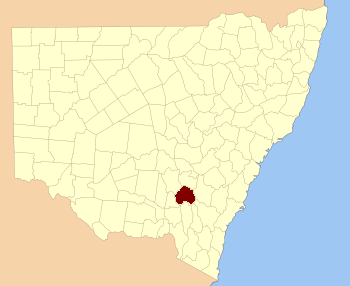
Cumbamurra.

Cumbamurra, New South Wales is a civil parish of Harden County, New South Wales.

Cumbamurra, New South Wales is located at 34.631667°S 148.434444°E on Jugiong Creek, a tributary of the Murrumbidgee River. Cumbamurra is on Burley Griffin Way between Harden and Binalong, New South Wales.

There was a planned village of the same name, which once had a school. The village's site was on the right bank of Rocky Ponds Creek, a tributary of Jugiong Creek that was previously known as Spring Creek, at the location of the creek crossing of the main road from Binalong to Harden. The site for the village was reserved in 1865.
