= Bookham, New South Wales =

Bookham
- Town
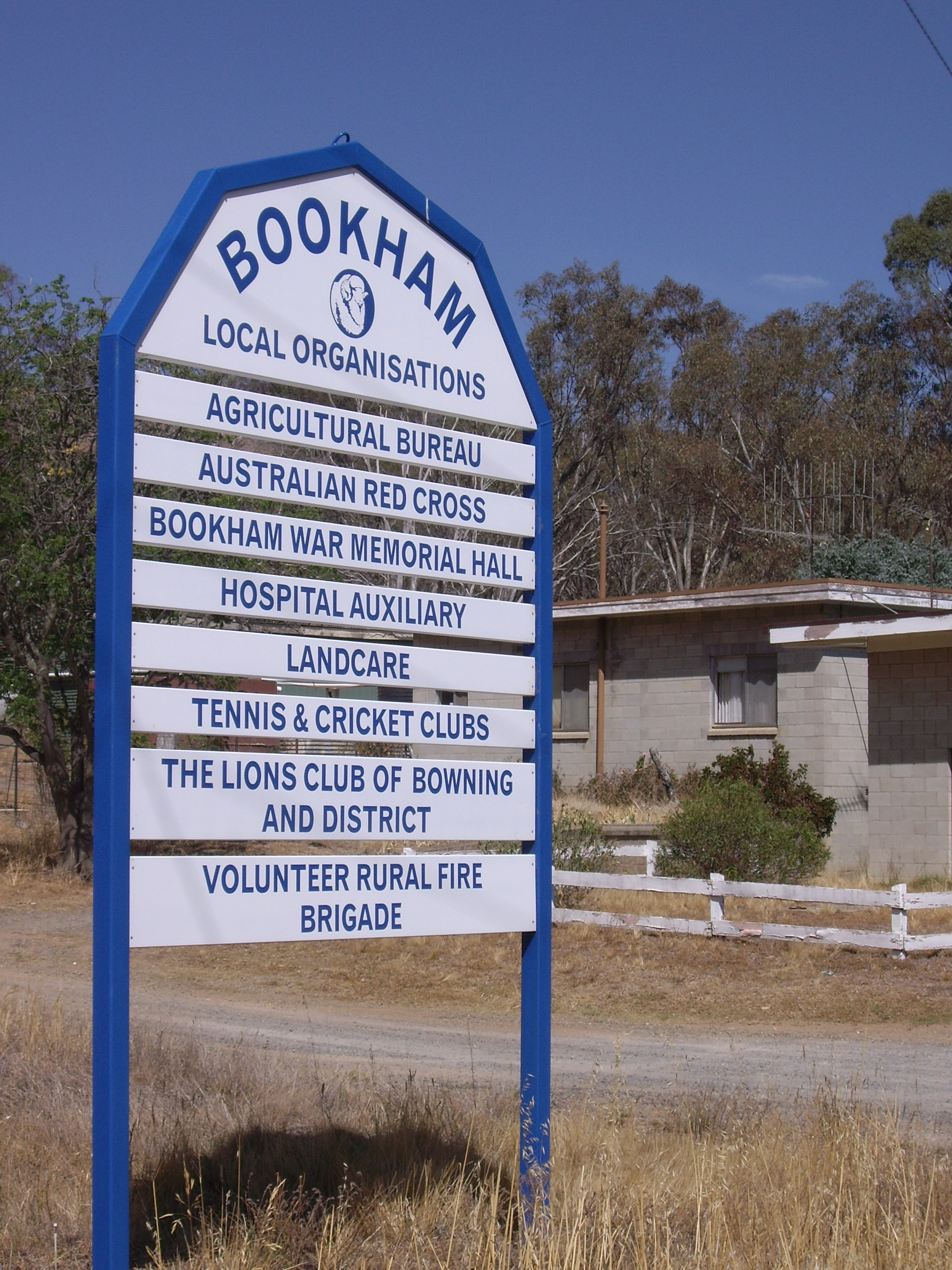
- Entering Bookham

- Coordinates: 34°48′47″S 148°38′36″E
- Country: Australia
- State: New South Wales
- LGA: Yass Valley Council
- Location: 308 km (191 mi) from Sydney; 149 km (93 mi) from Wagga Wagga; 29 km (18 mi) from Jugiong; 20 km (12 mi) from Bowning; 75 km (47 mi) from Gundagai

Government
  - State electorate: Goulburn
  - Federal division: Riverina
- Elevation: 467 m (1,532 ft)

Population
  - Total: 127 (SAL 2021)
- Postcode: 2582
- County: Harden
- Mean max temp: 19.2 °C (66.6 °F)
- Mean min temp: 6.5 °C (43.7 °F)
- Annual rainfall: 1,076.7 mm (42.39 in)
Localities around Bookham
Berremangra	Binalong	Bowning
Berremangra	Bookham	Bowning
Adjungbilly	Burrinjuck	Woolgarlo

Bookham is a small village and rural locality in the South West Slopes region of New South Wales, Australia in Yass Valley Shire. It is about 29 km west of Yass on the Hume Highway.

== Overview ==
The general grazing area which now encompasses the village of Bookham was originally collectively called Bogolong and childhood memories of the races at Bogalong Racetrack inspired Banjo Paterson to write his poem Old Pardon the Son of Reprieve.

In 1838 Edward Green had an Inn and cultivated land at Cumbookambookmah (sometimes incorrectly transcribed as Cumbookambookinah) on the Bogolong Creek at what is now called Bookham

Shortly after a design for the village at Cumbookambookmah was drawn up and that name was shortened either through general usage or by design to the current name of Bookham.

The name change came about in 1839 when Lady Jane Franklin, wife of John Franklin, the Lieutenant Governor of Van Diemen's Land between 1837 and 1843, became the first European woman to travel overland from Port Phillip to Sydney and stayed in the area in 1839.

The name Bookham was being used officially, by August 1839.

There is an urban legend of the town once being a frequent spot for hiding police to 'book em' motorists speeding through town. Further to the legend, truck drivers would jettison some of their goods (e.g. a newspaper from a paper truck) next to the hiding spot before speeding off, hence the police focusing on cars.

Iron was smelted from locally mined iron ore at a site on Jugiong Creek approximately 3 km north of Bookham in 1874, by the Bogolong Iron Mining Company. Remnants of the blast furnace still exist, one of only three 19th-Century blast furnace ruins in Australia and the only one in New South Wales. It is included in the N.S.W. heritage database.

The southern extremity of the locality of Bookham, along Burringjuck Road, was a part of a proposed site for the national capital city of Australia, known as Mahkoolma. Had that proposed site been adopted, the village of Bookham would have become a part of the capital territory.

Bookham Post Office opened on 1 September 1864, following the establishment of a mail run from Tumut in 1882. This involved crossing the Murrumbidgee at Roche's crossing. Bookham Post Office closed in 1993. While the Post Office had a number of homes, its most recent has now been turned into a café, Barney's of Bookham.

There are two churches: the Uniting Church (c. 1926) and St. Columba's Catholic Church, (c. 1910) still standing in the town. St Columba's Catholic Church has been transformed into stylish accommodation for up to 8 people. Now called The Old Bookham Church it has been lovingly restored in keeping with its heritage.

At the 2016 census, Bookham had a population of 161 people. 82.7% of people were born in Australia and 87.7% of people spoke only English at home.

== Climate ==
Owing to Bookham's location in between the western slopes of New South Wales and the dividing range, west of Conroys Gap, it varies greatly in seasonal maximum temperatures with a distinct winter rainfall peak. Falls of snow are not uncommon.

Climate data for Red Hill State Forest (1938–1970); 640 m AMSL; 35.17° S, 148.37° E
Month	Jan	Feb	Mar	Apr	May	Jun	Jul	Aug	Sep	Oct	Nov	Dec	Year
Mean daily maximum °C (°F)	28.7 (83.7)	27.8 (82.0)	25.1 (77.2)	19.5 (67.1)	14.5 (58.1)	11.1 (52.0)	10.0 (50.0)	11.7 (53.1)	15.3 (59.5)	18.6 (65.5)	21.9 (71.4)	26.3 (79.3)	19.2 (66.6)
Mean daily minimum °C (°F)	12.5 (54.5)	12.8 (55.0)	10.5 (50.9)	6.7 (44.1)	3.7 (38.7)	1.9 (35.4)	0.8 (33.4)	1.5 (34.7)	3.3 (37.9)	5.9 (42.6)	8.0 (46.4)	10.8 (51.4)	6.5 (43.7)
Average precipitation mm (inches)	73.3 (2.89)	56.1 (2.21)	76.1 (3.00)	78.6 (3.09)	108.3 (4.26)	96.5 (3.80)	117.0 (4.61)	118.9 (4.68)	91.5 (3.60)	105.3 (4.15)	85.1 (3.35)	70.0 (2.76)	1,076.7 (42.39)
Average precipitation days (≥ 0.2 mm)	6.5	5.9	6.3	8.1	11.8	12.9	14.5	15.2	11.5	12.1	9.2	7.5	121.5
Source: Australian Bureau of Meteorology; Red Hill State Forest

== Gallery ==
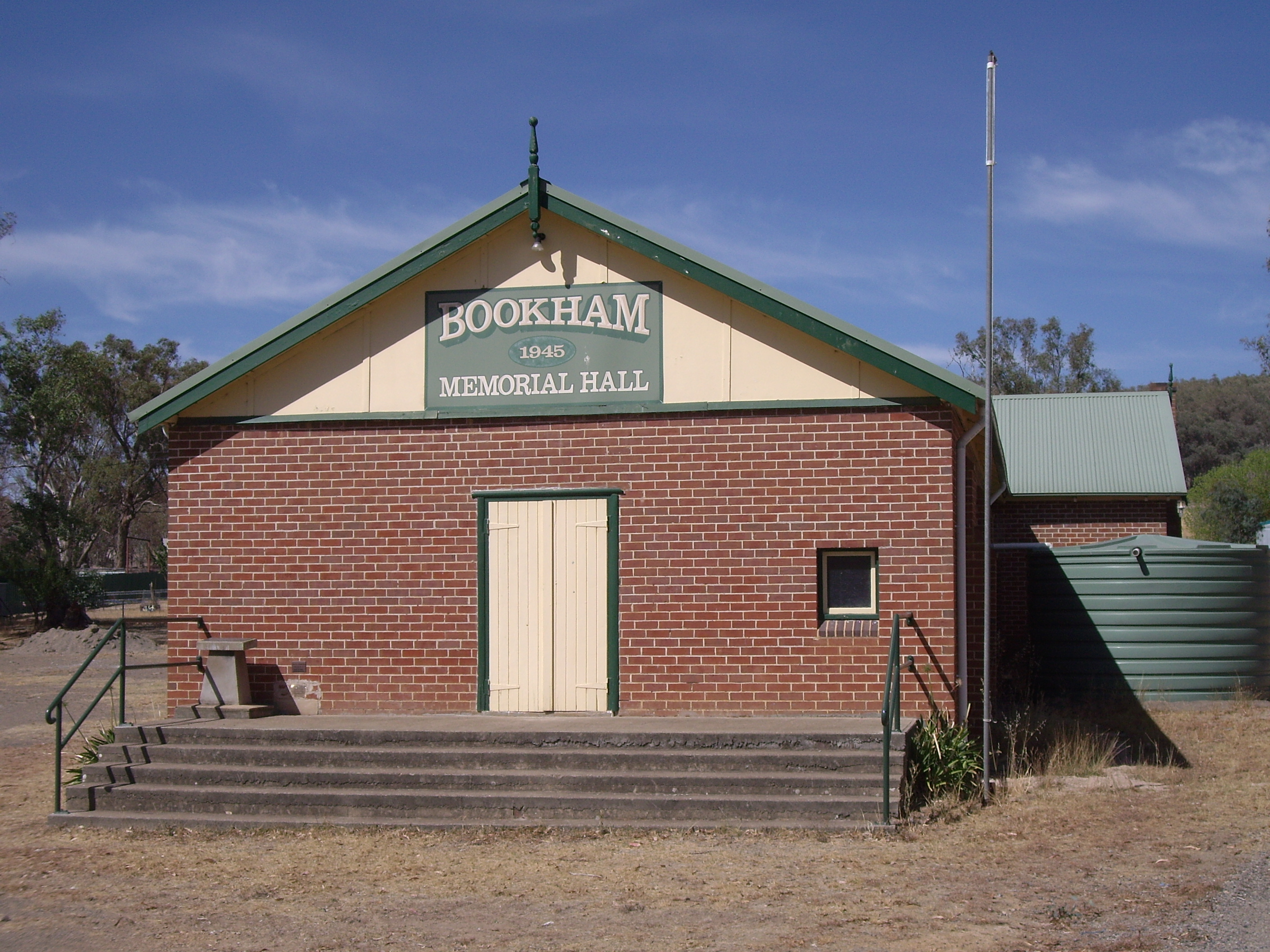
Bookham Memorial Hall.

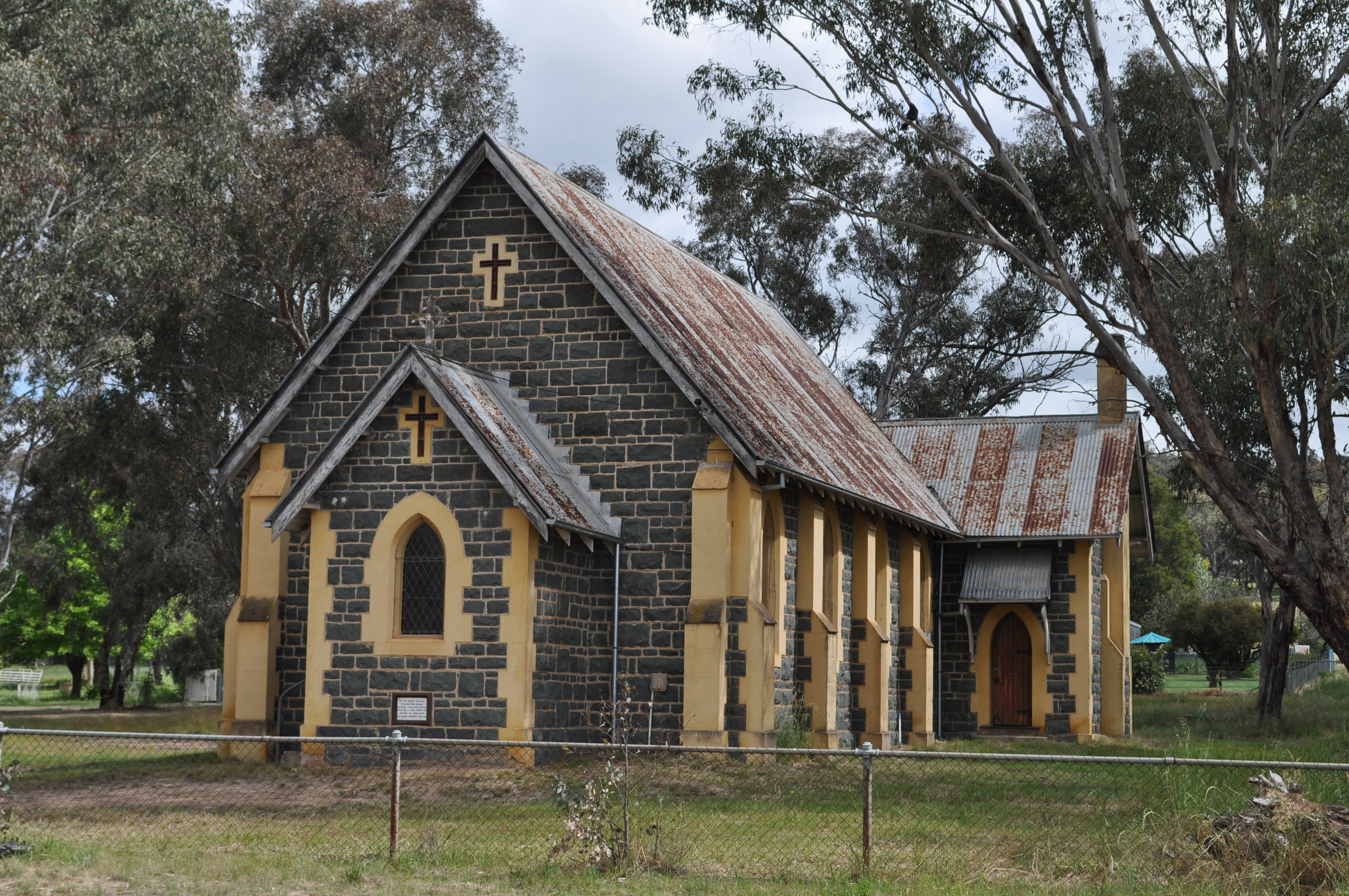
St Columba's Catholic Church.

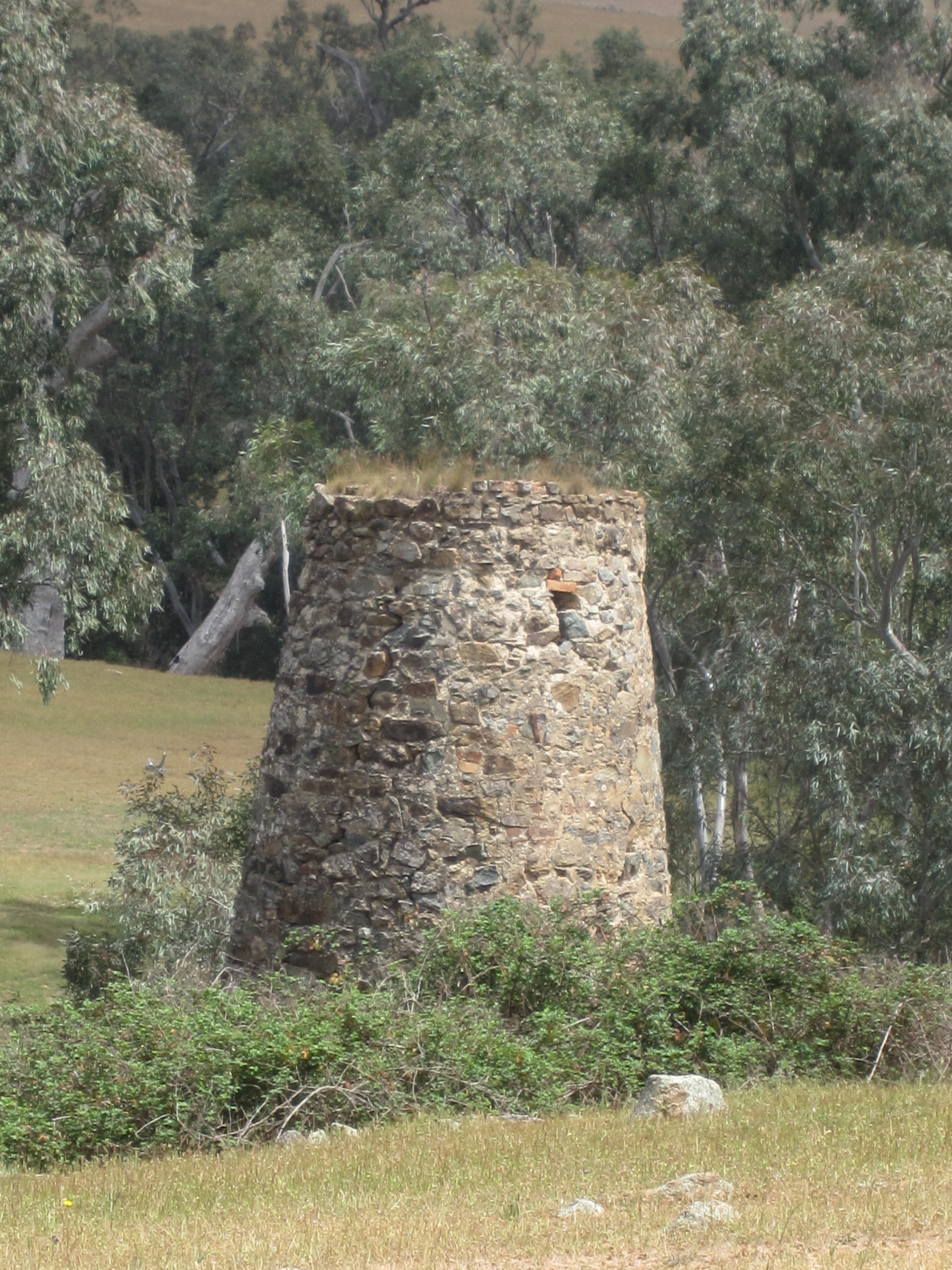
Upper part of Bogolong blast furnace ruin

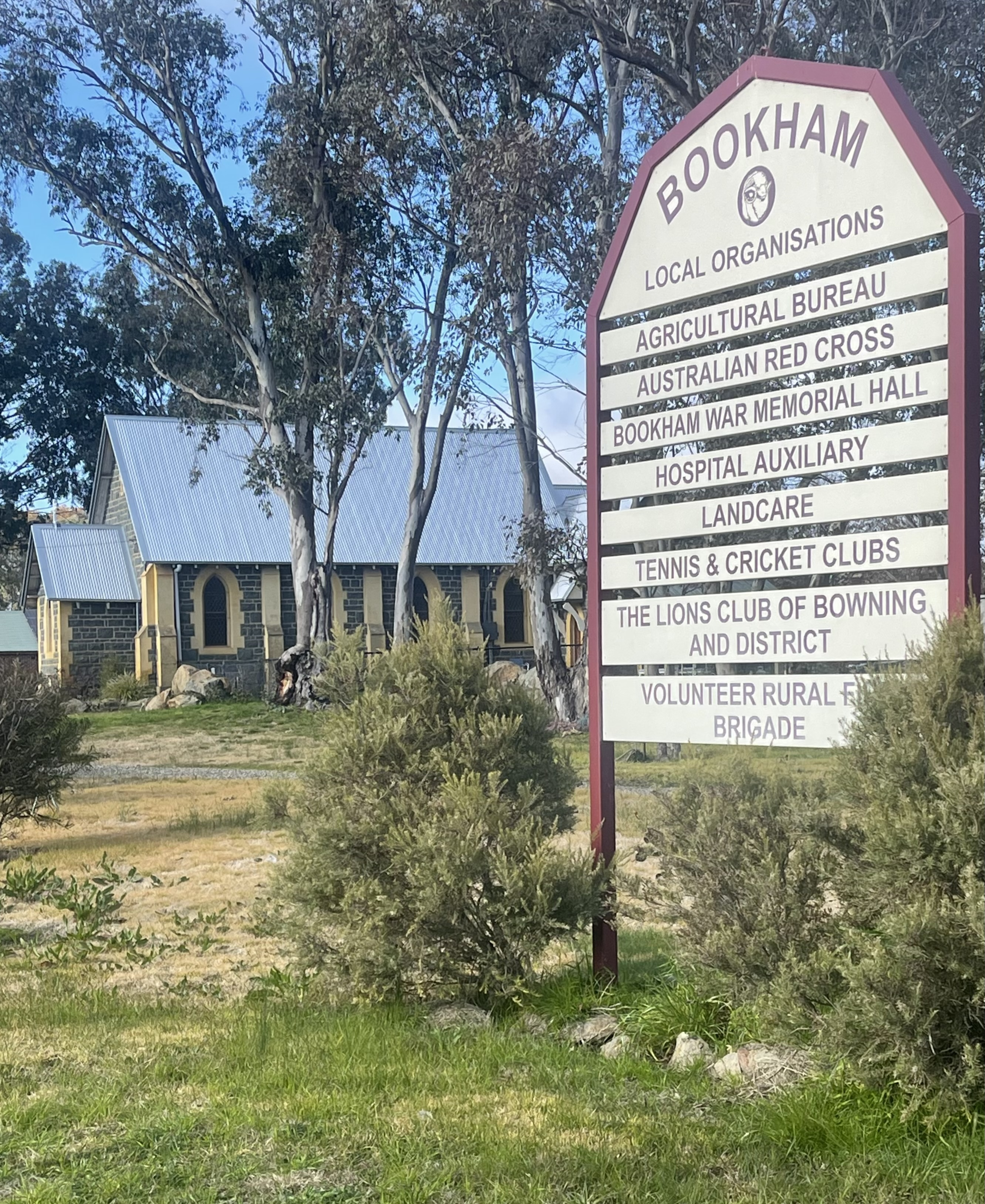

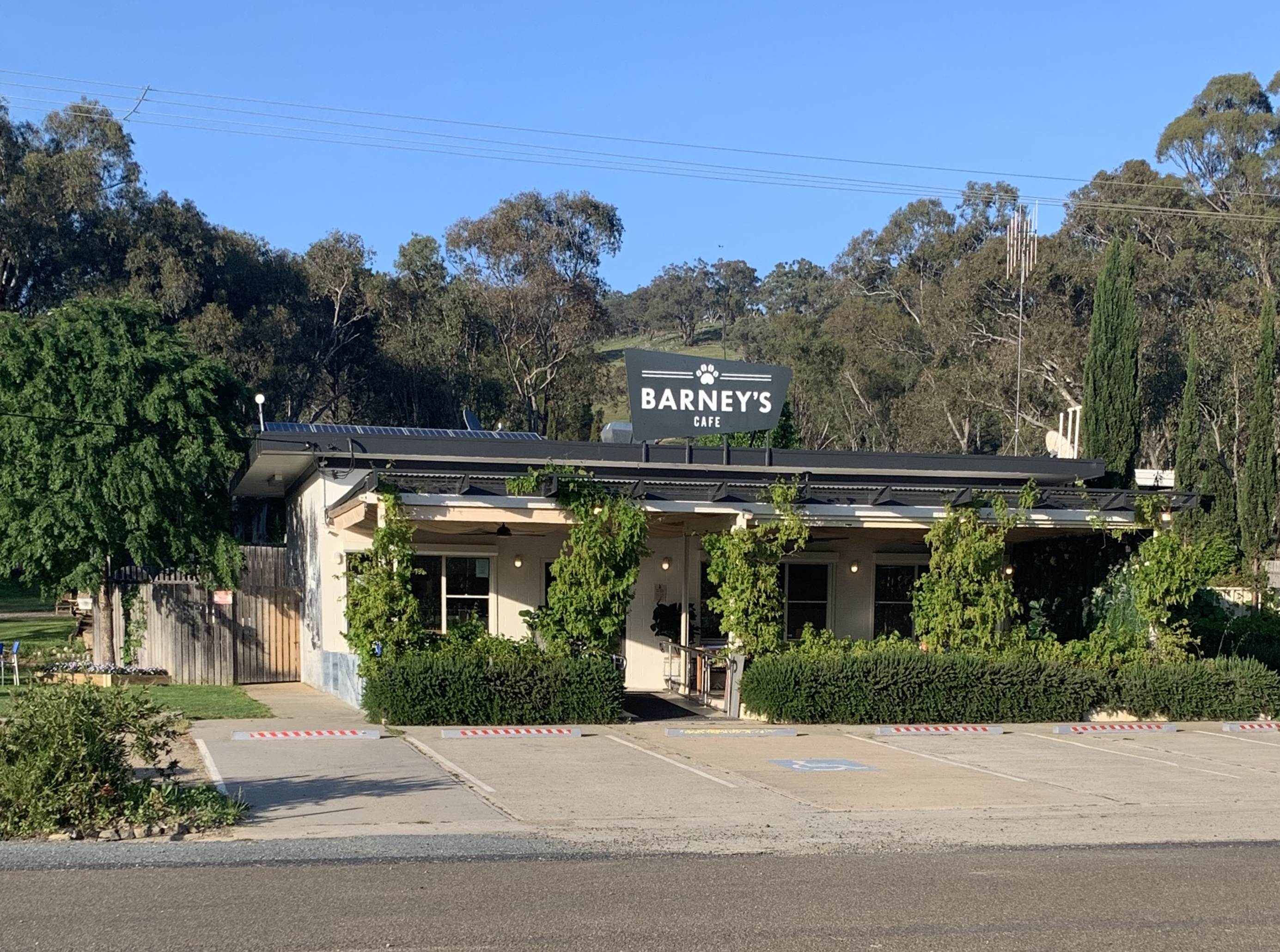
