= Yass Junction railway station =

Railway station in New South Wales, Australia

Yass Junction
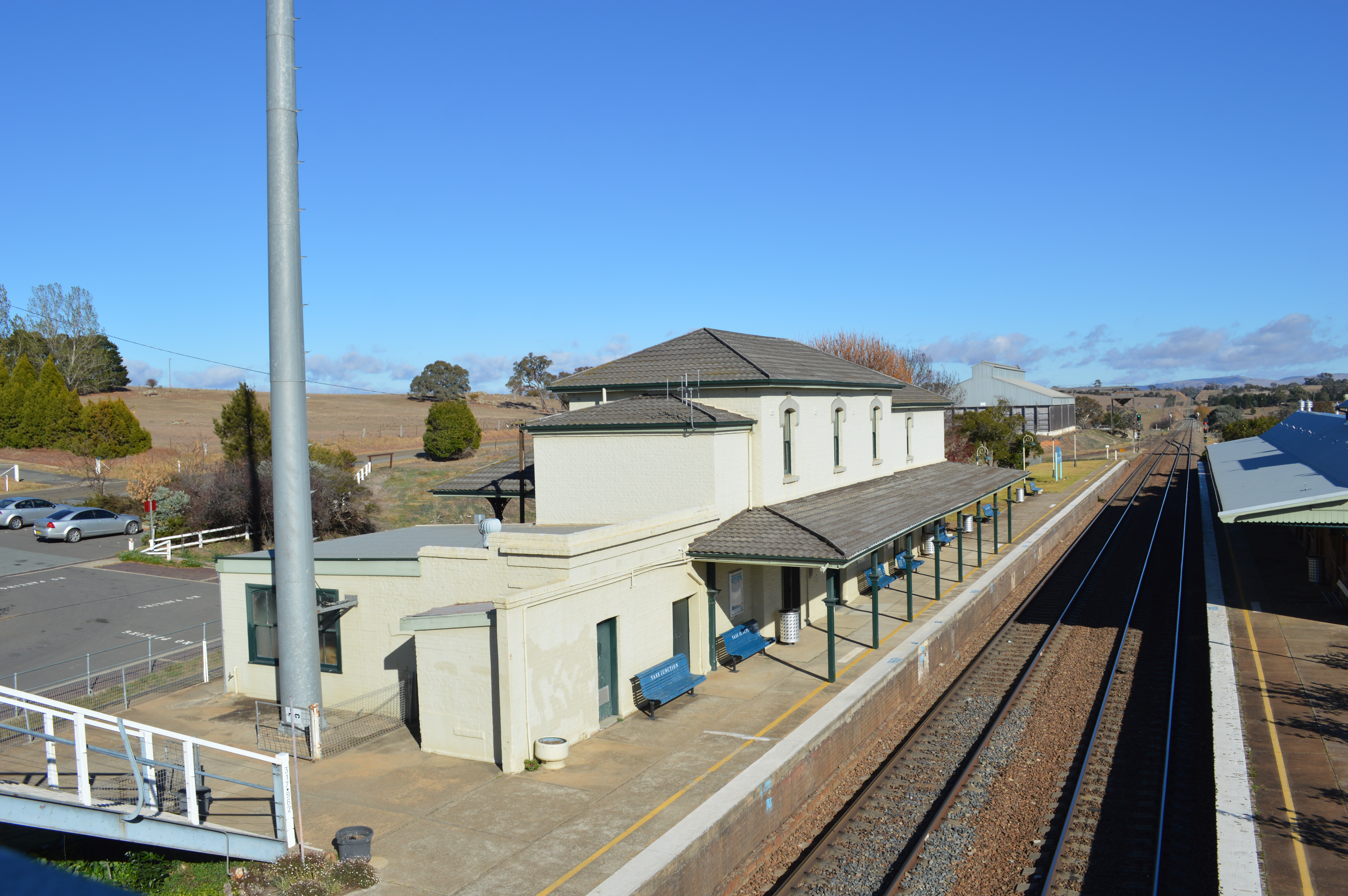
- Southbound view, May 2013

General information
- Location: Faulder Avenue, Yass; Australia
- Coordinates: 34°48′32″S 148°54′55″E
- Owner: Transport Asset Manager of New South Wales
- Operator: NSW TrainLink
- Lines: Main Southern; Yass Tramway
- Distance: 318.01 kilometres (197.60 mi) from Central
- Platforms: 2 side
- Tracks: 2

Construction
- Structure type: Ground
- Accessible: Assisted access

Other information
- Station code: YAS

History
- Opened: 3 July 1876
- Former names: Yass (1876–1892)

Services
| Preceding station | NSW TrainLink | Following station |
|---|---|---|
| Harden towards Griffith | NSW TrainLink Southern Line Griffith Xplorer | Gunning towards Sydney |
| Harden towards Melbourne | NSW TrainLink Southern Line Melbourne XPT | Gunning towards Sydney |
Former services
| Preceding station | Former services | Following station |
Former NSW Main line services
| Bowning towards Albury | Main Southern Line | Coolalie towards Sydney |
Location

Yass Junction railway station is a heritage-listed railway station on the Main Southern line in New South Wales, Australia. It serves the town of Yass. The station is not in the town itself but is located approximately four kilometres away near the Hume Highway. The station was listed on the New South Wales State Heritage Register on 2 April 1999.

== History ==
Yass Junction station is located about four kilometres north of the centre of Yass, due to the refusal of the Engineer-in-Chief of the New South Wales Railways, John Whitton to build the Main South line through the middle of Yass itself. After a visit on 8 December 1871, to investigate possible routes for the extension of the line from Goulburn, Whitton remarked that "to bring the station to North Yass would increase the length of the line by about three quarters of a mile; that the cost would be considerably more than I had recommended, probably £30,000 or £40,000 for works alone; and that in an engineering point of view [a] divergence to North Yass could not be entertained.

Despite strenuous objections to the proposal to bypass Yass, none of Whitton's working plans or other Government surveys were able to find a suitable route for the railway to pass through the town. Instead, the present route from Gunning to Bowning was chosen, and Yass station was opened on 3 July 1876 as Yass.

=== The Yass Tramway ===
After the New South Wales parliament passed an act "to authorise the construction of tramways along certain streets and highways in the city and suburbs of Sydney and elsewhere", a tramway was built from Yass Junction to Yass Town to convey passengers. The line opened on 20 April 1892, and Yass station was renamed Yass Junction on the same day. Trams departed from a small dock platform behind Platform 2 (the south-bound platform). On 18 May 1914, the line from Coolalie was duplicated.

Around 1917, consideration was given to extending the line from Yass to Canberra, as part of a grander plan to build a railway to a proposed port at Jervis Bay, and a Yass-Canberra route was determined.

Services on the Yass Tramway were suspended on the line on 1 January 1957, started again on 1 December 1957, but again suspended on 18 May 1958. A private bus service continued to carry passengers between the two locations but it also ceased on 18 May 1967. The final services were three steam specials hauled by locomotives 1210 and 3112 on 29 October 1988, before the line was formally closed on 14 November 1988. In 1990, Yass Town station was leased to the Australian Railway Historical Society.

== Services ==
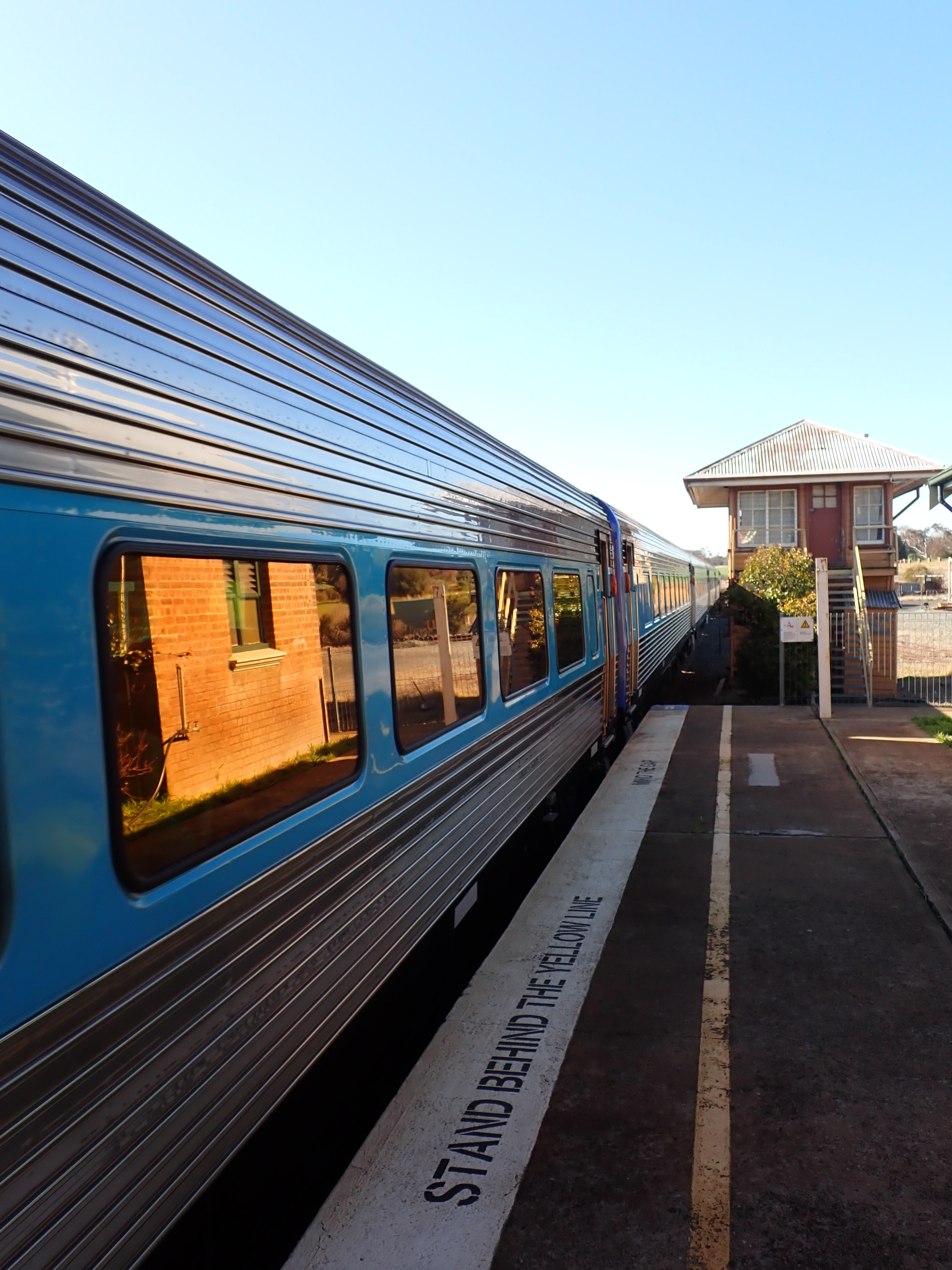
A Melbourne-bound train at platform 1, 2023

Yass Junction is served by two daily NSW TrainLink XPT services in each direction operating between Sydney and Melbourne, and a twice weekly NSW TrainLink Xplorer between Griffith and Sydney split from Canberra services at Goulburn. NSW TrainLink also operate a road coach service from Queanbeyan to Cootamundra via Yass Junction station. The station is a request stop for the evening Melbourne XPT trains, so those services only stop there if passengers have booked to board or alight.

| Platform | Line | Stopping pattern | Notes |
| 1 | Southern Region | services to Sydney Central, Griffith & Melbourne | evening return Melbourne XPT request stop (booked passengers only) |

== Heritage listing ==
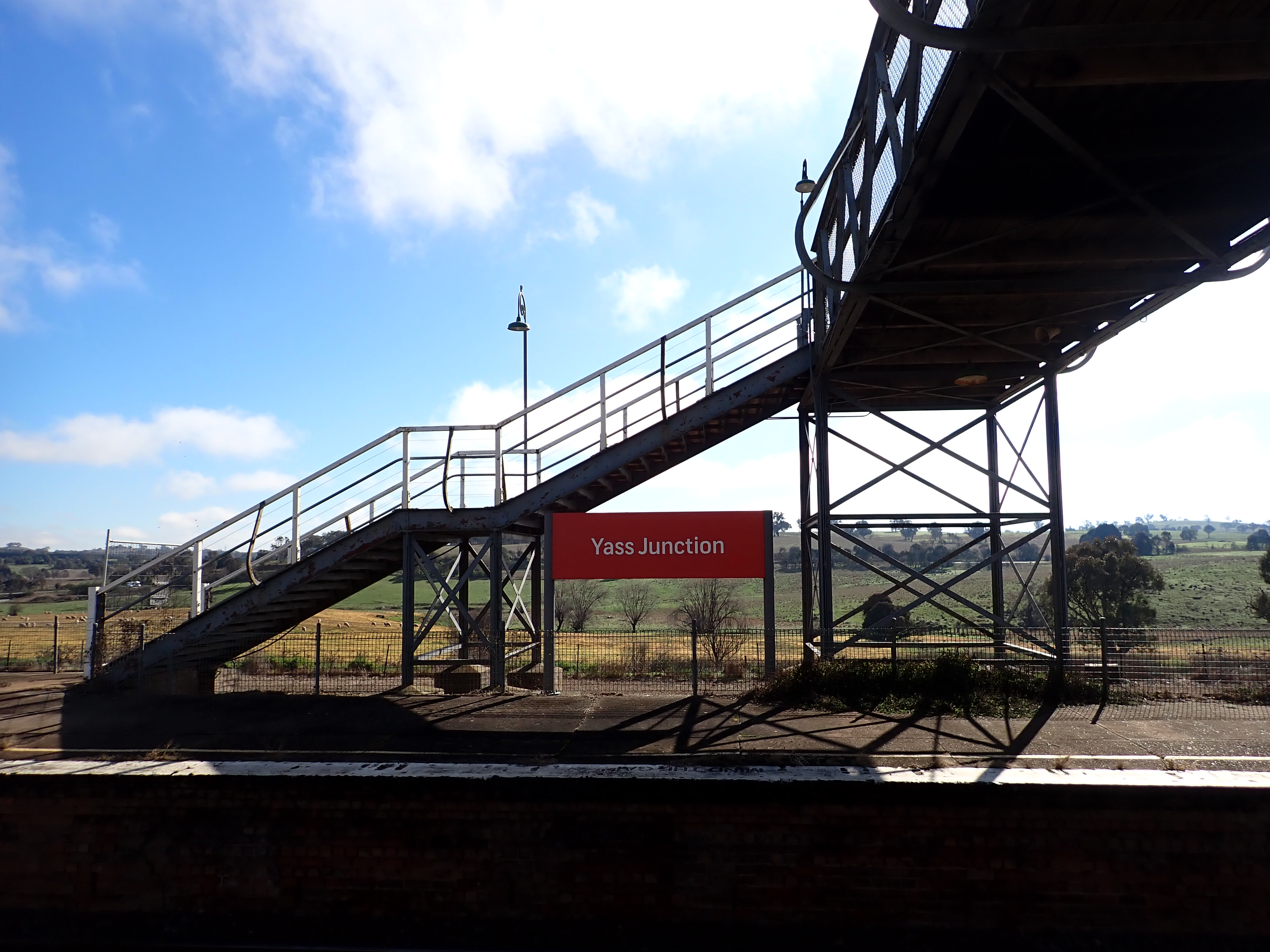
Yass Junction station footbridge, 2023

Yass Junction has the earliest surviving station building on the main southern railway, though altered. The site illustrates the changes from early construction with single-track operation to duplication, creating the need for a second platform with additional facilities, including refreshment rooms. Those facilities in a remote location indicated a concern by the railways to provide a modicum of redress to the citizens of Yass after engineering difficulties meant their town was by-passed by the Southern Railway. The site is significant because of the group of buildings, including a signal box, footbridge, station buildings and residence.

Yass Junction railway station was listed on the New South Wales State Heritage Register on 2 April 1999 having satisfied the criteria that the place possesses uncommon, rare or endangered aspects of the cultural or natural history of New South Wales. It was assessed as historically, architecturally and socially rare.
