= Rocky Ponds Creek =

Rocky Ponds Spring
- Location of the Rocky Ponds Creek mouth in New South Wales

Location
- Country: Australia
- State: New South Wales
- Region: South Eastern Highlands (IBRA), South West Slopes
- LGA: Hilltops

Physical characteristics
- Source: Great Dividing Range
  - location: east of Murrumburrah
  - coordinates: 34°31′56″S 148°31′5″E
  - elevation: 404 m (1,325 ft)
- Mouth: confluence with the Jugiong Creek
  - location: west of Binalong
  - coordinates: 34°41′33″S 148°28′56″E
  - elevation: 315 m (1,033 ft)
- Length: 25 km (16 mi)

Basin features
- River system: Murrumbidgee catchment, Murray–Darling basin

The Rocky Ponds Creek, a watercourse that is part of the Murrumbidgee catchment within the Murray–Darling basin, is located in the South West Slopes region of New South Wales, Australia.

== Course and features ==
The Rocky Ponds Creek (technically a river) rises below Rocky Ponds, approximately 16 kilometres (9.9 mi) east of the town of Murrumburrah, on the south western slopes of the Great Dividing Range. The creek flows generally west and then south before reaching its confluence with the Jugiong Creek (itself a tributary of the Murrumbidgee River) near the locality of Hidden Brook, and west of Binalong. The creek descends 89 metres (292 ft) over its 25-kilometre (16 mi) course.

The Burley Griffin Way crosses the creek in the parish of Cumbamurra.

== See also ==
- List of rivers of New South Wales (L-Z)
- Rivers of New South Wales
