= Bobbara, New South Wales =

Rural locality

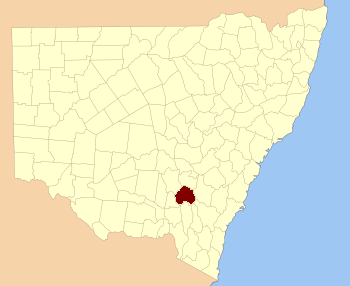
The parish is in Harden County.

Bobbara, New South Wales is a rural locality just off the Burley Griffin Way in south New South Wales.

Bobbara is in Hilltops Council between the village of Binalong. and Harden, New South Wales. Bobbara is about 80 km from Canberra. Bobbara, is also outside of Yass, New South Wales, just off the Hume Highway and the Sydney to Melbourne Railway Line.

Bobbara, New South Wales is also a Parish cadastral parish of Harden County New South Wales.
