= Bald Archy Prize =

Australian art prize

- Description: Parody of the Archibald Prize
- Country: Australia
- Established: in 1994 by Peter Batey
- Website: baldarchy.com.au

The Bald Archy is an Australian art prize, which parodies the prestigious portraiture award, the Archibald Prize. It usually includes cartoons or humorous works making fun of Australian celebrities.

== History ==
It was founded in 1994 by theatre director and actor Peter Batey, it is judged by Maude, Batey's cockatoo. The winning 2023 portrait featured Batey flying through a cloud filled sky on the back of Maude the cockatoo.

When asked about the prizes' choice of judge, Batey states:

“It takes 12 galahs to judge the Archibald but only one cockatoo to judge the Bald Archy,” - Peter Batey OAM, 2016

Since 2005, the home of the competition and its accompanying exhibition has been the Museum of the Riverina, Wagga Wagga. However, in 2008, the prize was announced during the Canberra portion of the national tour.

Batey died in June 2019, in a car accident near his home at Coolac, New South Wales.

Peter Batey bequeathed the past winning portraits and the rights to run the annual prize to the Museum of the Riverina in Wagga Wagga. The Museum relaunched the Prize in February 2023.

In 2024, the touring exhibition visited Australian regional galleries including Holbrook, Deniliquin, Corowa, Temora and finishes in Wagga Wagga in New South Wales.

== List of winners ==
Year – Artist – Title (Subject)

- 1994 – Rocco Fazzari – Yuk! Mr Edmund Capon (Edmund Capon)
- 1995 – Alan McClure – Kerry's Goal (Kerry Packer)
- 1996 – Rocco Fazzari – Warhead (Jeff Kennett)
- 1997 – Vincent de Gouw – John Howard Washes His Hands Of Pauline Hanson (Apologies To Manet) (John Howard, Pauline Hanson)
- 1998 – Peter Wilkinson – Shane Warne: What Me Worry? (Shane Warne)
- 1999 – Eric Lobbecke – Cyclops – Government's One-eyed Nemesis (Brian Harradine)
- 2000 – Dave Ross – Yes Possums! It's Australia's First Lady and Patron Of The Bald Archys (Dame Edna Everage)
- 2001 – Eric Lobbecke – The Skase Chaser (Amanda Vanstone)
- 2002 – Xavier Ghazi – Mutant (Ian Thorpe)
- 2003 – Louise Klein – What Odds? (Robbie and Gai Waterhouse)
- 2004 – Xavier Ghazi – I'll Eat You In The End (Rupert Murdoch)
- 2005 – Tony Sowersby – The Cardinal With His Abbott (Cardinal George Pell and Tony Abbott)
- 2006 – Matt Adams – Brown-Stain Janus-Faced (John Olsen)
- 2007 – Xavier Ghazi – There's Nothing Like Barry (Dame Edna Everage/Barry Humphries)
- 2008 – James Brennan – The Official Portrait of the Danish Royal Family (Crown Prince Frederik, Crown Princess Mary, Prince Christian and Princess Isabella of Denmark)
- 2009 – [James Brennan] – Old Owl Eyes is Back (Bart Cummings)
- 2010 – Judy Nadin – Patti's Cake (Bert Newton)
- 2011 – Xavier Ghazi – Bad Ass-Ange (Julian Assange)
- 2012 – Allie Campbell – A Fitting Frame 1 and 2 (Julia Gillard and Tony Abbott)
- 2013 – Warren Lane – The Banquet of Gina and Ginia (Gina Rinehart and her daughter Ginia)
- 2014 – Judy Nadin – Wrecking Balls Ashes to Ashes (Mitchell Johnson)
- 2015 – Xavier Ghazi – Archibald and the Bald Archy, a Photo Bomb (J. F. Archibald)
- 2016 – Pat Hudson – Nothing to Say (Cardinal George Pell)
- 2017 – James Brennan - Pocket Rocket (David Warner)
- 2018 – James Brennan - Ahn Can Do (Anh Do)
- 2019 – Simon Schneider - Geoffrey (Geoffrey Rush)
- 2020-2022 awards were not run
- 2023 – Marty Steel - Never a Dull Moment (Peter Batey)
