= Bowning railway station =

Railway station in New South Wales, Australia

Bowning
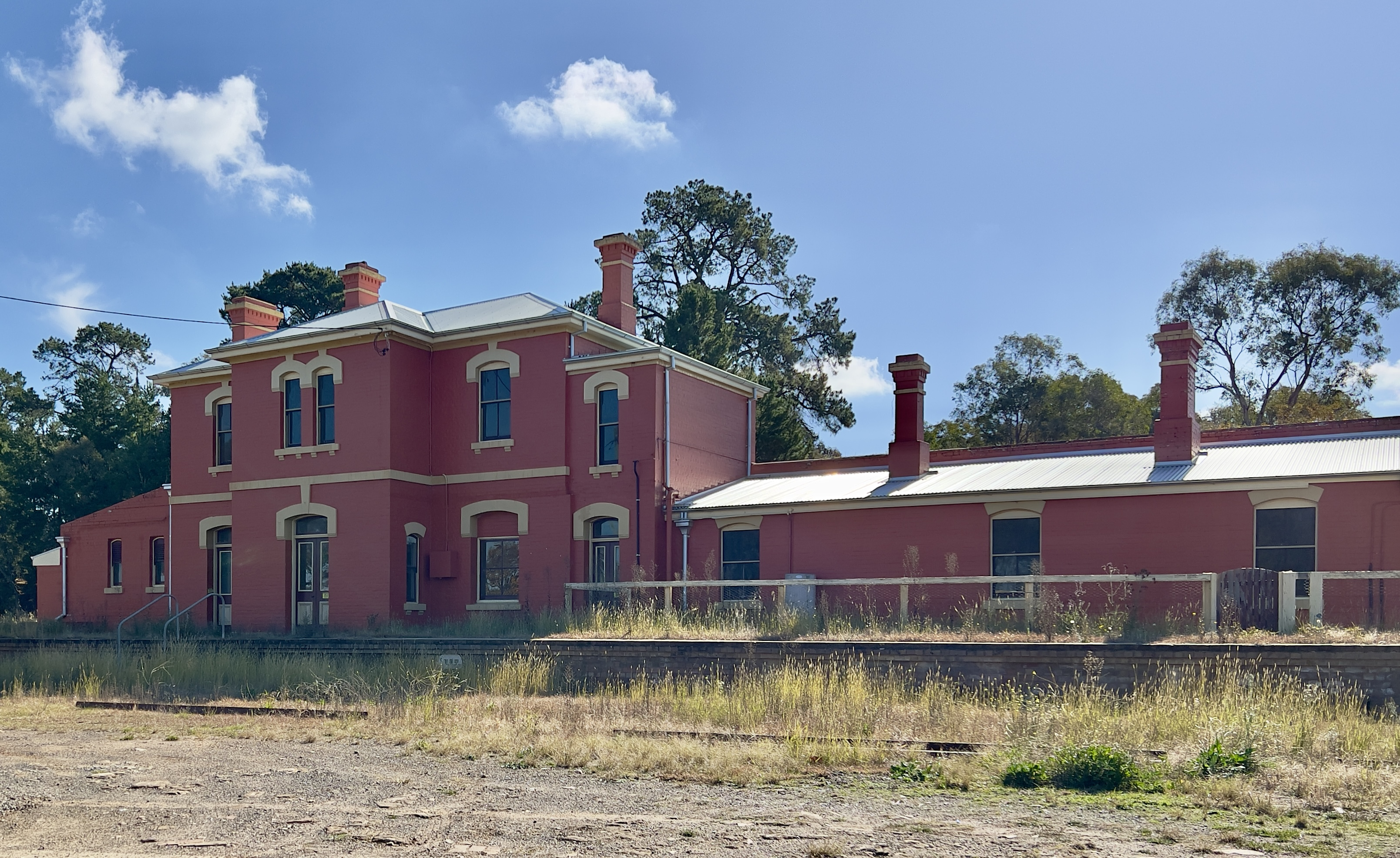
- The station building, 2023

General information
- Location: Wales Close, Bowning, New South Wales; Australia
- Coordinates: 34.7658°S 148.8204°E
- Owner: Transport Asset Manager of New South Wales
- Line: Main Southern
- Distance: 329.300 km from Central
- Platforms: 5 (2 island, 1 dock)
- Tracks: 6

Construction
- Structure type: Ground

Other information
- Status: Closed

History
- Opened: 3 July 1876
- Closed: 1992

Services
Preceding station	Former services	Following station
Goondah towards Albury	Main Southern Line	Yass Junction towards Sydney

New South Wales Heritage Register
- Official name: Bowning Railway Station group
- Type: State Heritage (complex / group)
- Designated: 2 April 1999
- Reference no.: 1096
- Type: Railway Platform/Station
- Category: Transport – Rail
Location
- Location within New South Wales

Bowning railway station is a heritage-listed closed railway station, located on the Main Southern railway in Bowning, in the Southern Tablelands region of New South Wales, Australia. The station was added to the New South Wales State Heritage Register on 2 April 1999.

== History ==
Bowning station was opened in 1876 and closed to passenger services in the 1990s.

== Description ==
The large two-storey station building is on the down platform, and was built in 1875. The skillion roofed timber signal box dates from circa 1913, as does the type 6, timber J2 residence. The residence was sold on 2 February 1998 and is now privately owned and not included within the heritage listing. The station building itself was used as a residence, but had to be vacated due to termite damage and the presence of asbestos. As of 2016, the exterior was in good condition, but a lot of the interior remained gutted. A timber shed is also included within the station site.

The station had two brick island platforms. The intact platform lighting forms part of the heritage listing. A 1913 steel and timber footbridge was removed c. 1990.

== Heritage listing ==
In April 1999, Bowning railway station was listed on the New South Wales State Heritage Register, having satisfied the following criteria:

- The place possesses uncommon, rare or endangered aspects of the cultural or natural history of New South Wales.
- This item is assessed as historically rare. This item is assessed as scientifically rare. This item is assessed as arch. rare. This item is assessed as socially rare.

The statement of significance accompanying the heritage listing notes:

This is a substantial early station building from 1876 representing the enthusiasm and confidence of early station building design. It is typical of a number of buildings constructed on the southern line. The station complex also exhibits the changes that have taken place with duplication in 1913 and the addition of a platform at the rear of the building so that it became an island platform. The other buildings on the site allow the change in operation to be clearly seen. The station building is one of the few surviving combined station / residences and is of high significance in illustrating the development of the State railway system.
