= Cunningar =

Cunningar New South Wales
- Coordinates: 34°33′35.8″S 148°24′59.4″E
- Population: 163 (SAL 2021)
- Postcode(s): 2587
- LGA(s): Hilltops Council
- County: Harden
- State electorate(s): Cootamundra
- Federal division(s): Riverina

Cunningar is a locality in the Hilltops Council local government area, within the South West Slopes region of New South Wales, Australia. It is located immediately to the east of the town of Harden. There is a parish of the County of Harden of the same name, which comprises a part of the area of the locality.

The area now known as Cunningar lies on the traditional lands of Ngunnawal people, close to the eastern edge of the traditional lands of Wiradjuri people.

Following colonial settlement, the area became used predominantly for agriculture and grazing. When the official map of Thomas Mitchell was made in 1834, there was already one settler house shown at what was then called Cunningham's Plains. Cunningham's Plains was the name of an immense rural estate of around 60,000 acres, which was not sub-divided into smaller properties until the early 20th century. Cunningar remains a rural locality today. As the area lay outside the Nineteen Counties, in which the colonial government permitted colonial settlement, the first settlers of the area, before 1834, were undoubtedly squatters, who had moved onto Aboriginal land and taken it over.

A village of Cunningar was proclaimed in 1857 and town lots were put up for sale in the same year. Around that time, it was uncertain whether Cunningar or Murrumburrah would become the larger settlement in the area, but the discovery of gold at Demondrille, near Murrumburrah, caused that town to prosper.

Two of the streets of the village still exist today, as Allen and Allman Streets. However, the main part of the village was to have been north-east of the main road and railway line, with the two existing streets being just one corner of a larger town plan. In 1881, the site was selected for a town of Cunningar, which was proclaimed in 1885. Its boundaries were proclaimed in 1891.

There was quartz reef mining for gold and silver, in the mid-1880s and 1890s. carried out by the 'Cunningar Company', It seems that was at a mine, in the south of the locality in the area known as MacMahon's Reef, which originally dated from the 1870s. An unusual feature of this operation was that the quartz was smelted in a 'water-jacket' (blast) furnace using coke as fuel, rather than crushing the quartz, to extract the gold and silver. It was probably the presence of the smelter that led to the plan for a larger town.

The development of a large centre so close to Murrumburrah—and later Murrumburrah's twin town, Harden, which was even closer—was unlikely, and only a small settlement ever developed at Cunningar. In 1937, it had a 'cottage post office', church hall and school. The Anglican Church Hall (St Barnabas) was built and opened in 1922. It functioned both as a church and public hall, with the sanctuary screened off when not in use for worship. It hosted public functions such as dances and socials, as late as the early 1950s. Cunningar had a public school from 1870 to 1960. It had a railway station, operating from 1877 to 1975, that no longer exists. Its post office closed in 1967. However, the larger town plan of Cunningar still existed, on paper only, into the 1970s.

Cunningar lies on the Main Southern railway line, and it has a grain siding and storage facility. In a good season, about 100,000 tonnes of grain pass through the siding. Graincorp upgraded the grain facility at the rail siding in 2017, using funds that were raised in part by local grain growers, saving around $8 to $10 per tonne in grain handling costs.

In 2016, the population was 145, which had increased to 163 at the 2021 census.
