= Currawong, New South Wales =

Currawong, New South Wales, is rural locality of Hilltops Council and is a civil parish of Harden County, New South Wales.

Currawong is located at 34°27′54″S 148°22′04″E on Currawong Creek. The nearest towns are Harden, New South Wales to the south and Wombat, New South Wales to the west.
