= Cowcumbala, New South Wales =

Locality in New South Wales, Australia

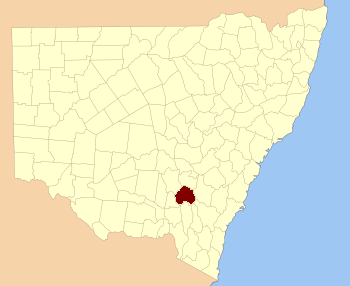
Harden County

Cowcumbala, New South Wales is a rural locality and civil parish of Harden County, New South Wales.

The parish of Cowcumbala is located at 34°43'54.0"S 148°04'04.0"E on the Main Southern railway line, New South Wales. The nearest town is Cootamundra to the north. Cowcumbala is on the traditional lands of the Wiradjuri people.
