= Balgalal Creek =

River in Australia

Balgalal Bangalal, Bungalal, Sheep Station
- Location of the Balgalal Creek mouth in New South Wales

Location
- Country: Australia
- State: New South Wales
- Region: South Eastern Highlands (IBRA), South Western Slopes
- LGA: Yass Valley
- Town: Binalong

Physical characteristics
- Source: Great Dividing Range
  - location: near Eubindal
  - coordinates: 34°36′23″S 148°43′29″E
- Mouth: confluence with Jugiong Creek
  - location: west of Binalong
  - coordinates: 34°43′33″S 148°34′47″E
- Length: 19 km (12 mi)

Basin features
- River system: Lachlan sub-catchment, Murray–Darling basin

The Balgalal Creek, a mostly–perennial river that is part of the Lachlan sub-catchment of the Murrumbidgee catchment within the Murray–Darling basin, is located in the South Western Slopes region of New South Wales, Australia.

== Course and features ==
The Balgalal Creek (technically a river) rises south southeast of Eubindal, on the south western slopes of the Great Dividing Range, and flows generally southwest before reaching its confluence with the Jugiong Creek.

== See also ==
- List of rivers of New South Wales (A–K)
- Rivers of New South Wales
- Janet Dawson
