= Burra Creek (Gundagai) =

Burra
- Location of the Burra Creek mouth in New South Wales

Location
- Country: Australia
- State: New South Wales
- Region: South Eastern Highlands (IBRA), South Western Slopes
- LGA: Cootamundra-Gundagai

Physical characteristics
- Source: Great Dividing Range
  - location: below The Sisters
  - coordinates: 34°51′54″S 147°56′35″E
  - elevation: 565 m (1,854 ft)
- Mouth: confluence with Muttama Creek
  - location: northwest of Coolac
  - coordinates: 34°53′54″S 148°8′19″E
  - elevation: 248 m (814 ft)
- Length: 29 km (18 mi)

Basin features
- River system: Murrumbidgee catchment, Murray–Darling basin
- Tributaries
  - left: Yammatree Creek
  - right: Bongongalong Creek

The Burra Creek, a mostly–perennial river that is part of the Murrumbidgee catchment within the Murray–Darling basin, is located in the South Western Slopes region of New South Wales, Australia.

== Course and features ==
The Burra Creek (technically a river) rises below The Sisters, on the northern slopes of Ginendoe Hill, part of the Great Dividing Range, and flows generally east, then south, then east, joined by two minor tributaries before reaching its confluence with the Muttama Creek northwest of Coolac. The Muttama Creek is a tributary of the Murrumbidgee River. The Burra Creek descends 318 metres (1,043 ft) over its 29-kilometre (18 mi) course.

== See also ==
- List of rivers of New South Wales (A–K)
- Rivers of New South Wales
