= Murrimboola, New South Wales =

Murrimboola
- Coordinates: 34°33′0″S 148°22′0″E
- Country: Australia
- State: New South Wales
- LGA: Hilltops Council

Government
  - State electorate: Cootamundra
  - Federal division: Riverina
- Elevation: 431 m (1,414 ft)
- Postcode: 2587
- Mean max temp: 21.7 °C (71.1 °F)
- Mean min temp: 7.4 °C (45.3 °F)
- Annual rainfall: 609.1 mm (23.98 in)

Murrimboola, New South Wales is a rural locality and civil parish of Harden County, New South Wales. The parish is at Harden, New South Wales, on Currawong Creek.
