= Birrema, New South Wales =

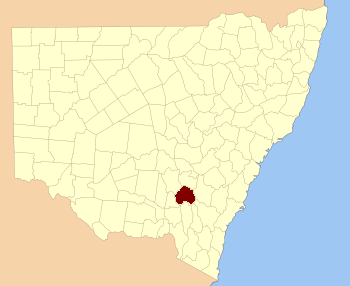
Harden County

Birrema, New South Wales is a civil parish of Harden County, New South Wales.

The parish is at 34°50'54.0"S 148°28'04.0"E on the Murrumbidgee River and the main landmark of the parish is Burrinjuck Dam. The Hume Highway passes along the northern boundary of the parish.
