= Peter Batey (director) =

Australian director (1933–2019)

Peter Batey OAM
- Born: 1933; Benalla, Victoria
- Died: 14 June 2019 (aged 85–86); Coolac
- Occupation(s): Actor, director
- Organization(s): Melbourne Theatre Company, South Australian Theatre Company
- Known for: Founding the Bald Archy Prize

Peter Batey (1933–14 June 2019) was an Australian actor, director and founder of the Bald Archy Prize. He was a founding member of the Melbourne Theatre Company and the South Australian Theatre Company.

== Early life and education ==
Batey was born in Benalla, Victoria in 1933 and moved to Melbourne when he was 16, where he studied drama.

== Career ==
Batey worked as a playwright, a director, a founding member of both the Melbourne Theatre Company and the South Australian Theatre Company 1961 saw the debut of his first play The No Hopers; he directed approximately 130 others. He was the first director of the Victorian Arts Council and helped Barry Humphries create the Dame Edna Everage character.

Batey Launched the Bald Archy Prize in 1994 scheduled to occur during the Festival of Fun in the town of Coolac where he lived at that time.

He was awarded the Order of Australia in 1999 for services to community and arts.

== Death ==
Batey died when on 14 June 2019 while driving to his home in Cootamundra, his car struck a tree in Coolac. He may have had a heart attack.
