= Jugiong =

- Town
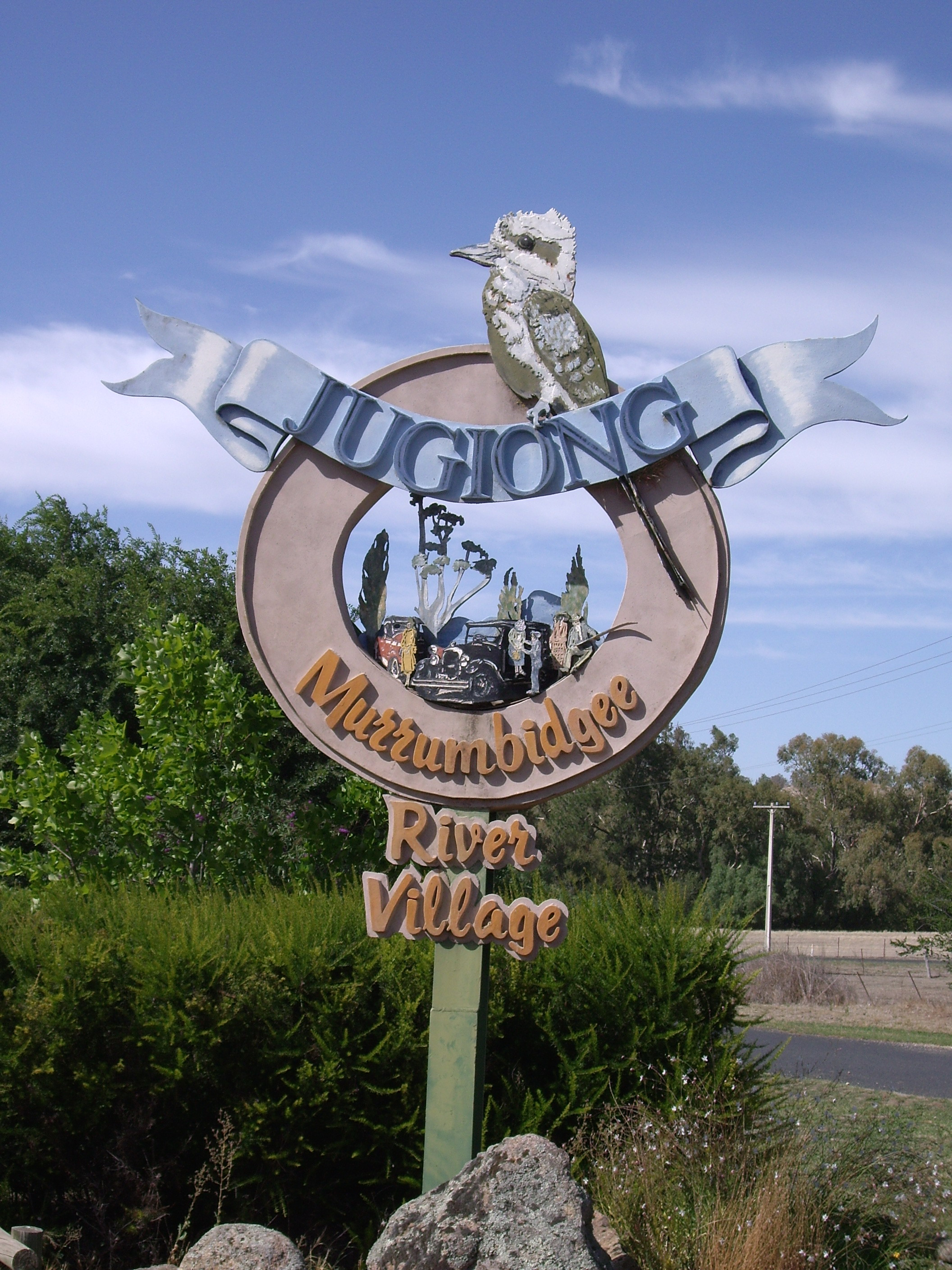
- Entering Jugiong at the old Hume Highway

- Coordinates: 34°49′23″S 148°19′29″E
- Country: Australia
- State: New South Wales
- Region: South West Slopes
- LGA: Hilltops Council
- Location: 30 km (19 mi) from Bookham; 40 km (25 mi) from Gundagai; 336 km (209 mi) WSW of Sydney; 61 km (38 mi) W of Yass

Government
  - State electorate: Cootamundra
  - Federal division: Riverina
- Elevation: 303 m (994 ft)

Population
  - Total: 255 (SAL 2021)
- Postcode: 2726
- County: Harden
- Parish: Jugiong
Localities around Jugiong
Cootamundra	Cooneys Creek	McMahons Reef
Coolac	Jugiong	Berremangra
Coolac	Gobarralong	Berremangra

Jugiong (/dʒuːɡɪɒŋ/ JOO-gi-ong) is a locality and town on the banks of the Murrumbidgee River near its confluence with Jugiong Creek. in the Hilltops Council Local Government area, New South Wales, Australia. It is situated just off the Hume Highway, by road, about 30 kilometres southwest from Bookham and 40 kilometres northeast from Gundagai.

The area now known as Jugiong lies on the traditional lands of the Wiradjuri people. The name Jugiong is almost certainly a settler rendering of a Wiradjuri language word. Settlers said that it was from 'U-go-wong' meaning 'the valley of the crows'.

It was first settled in the 1820s when Henry O'Brien started grazing sheep on the Jugiong Run. A public house was already at the future town's site, when John Sheehan took it over in 1844. A site for a town was reserved in 1853. Jugiong Post Office opened on 1 October 1856. Tenders were sought, in 1858, for the construction of a bridge over Jugiong Creek that was opened by the second half of 1859. Jugiong has had a public school since 1883. John Sheehan donated the land and much of the cost for the erection of the town's Catholic Church, St John the Evangelist, built between 1858 and 1860. the town also had an Anglican Church, Christ Church, built in 1895 to replace and earlier church; no longer a church, the building is privately owned.

Jugiong is situated on a large—almost complete—loop in the Murrumbidgee River, into which Jugiong Creek flows just above the town site. The river splits into two streams just downstream as it passes Jugiong Island. The flats near the river, the island, and the lower part of the town site are prone to flooding, with major floods in 1852, 1870, 1891, 1894, 1900, 1922, 1925 and 1945. During the 1852 flood, John Sheehan saved the lives of 33 people, for which he was presented with a large engraved silver tankard, by the Government of New South Wales.

Modification and enlargement of the nearby upstream Burrinjuck Dam, which were completed in 1957, have provided some protection against floodwaters from the upper reaches of the Murrumbigee. Complicating the flood situation are occurrences of flash flooding of Jugiong Creek. The first bridge over the creek was destroyed by floodwaters in 1870, but replaced with a new one by July 1872. The buildings of the town were severely damaged in a storm, described as being a hurricane, in 1898.

Due to the flooding hazard of its location, and not being off the railway line, the town became more of a village, most but not all of which is now on the higher land. In earlier times, there were more buildings closer to the river. By 1872, Jugiong only had about 150 inhabitants. Several alterations to its design have been made, which reduced its extent.

Since 1933, water has been pumped from the river at Jugiong to two dams in the Cowang Hills from where it is reticulated to Cootamundra. The scheme was subsequently extended and now supplies water to settlements as far north as Young and as far west as Temora. South of Jugiong on the river there is a large quarrying operation for river gravel. A construction aggregate quarry north of the town is now a regional landfill site.

Jugiong was once on the main road between Yass and Gundagai, but the Hume Highway now bypasses it. It is now a quiet and pleasant stopover for travellers.

There is a memorial to Sergeant Edmund Parry, a police officer shot dead by the bushranger John Gilbert, on 16 November 1864, between Jugiong and Gundagai.

Australian cricketer turned commentator Richie Benaud spent part of his early life there.

At the 2016 census, Jugiong had a population of 222, which had increased to 255 at the 2021 census.
