= Coolalie railway station =

Former railway station in New South Wales, Australia

Coolalie

General information
- Location: Bango, New South Wales; Australia
- Coordinates: 34°47′06″S 148°58′57″E
- Operator: Public Transport Commission
- Line: Main Southern
- Distance: 309.900 km from Central
- Platforms: 2 (2 side)
- Tracks: 2

Construction
- Structure type: Ground

History
- Opened: 2 August 1891
- Closed: 20 January 1975
- Rebuilt: 18 May 1914

Services
Preceding station	Former services	Following station
Yass Junction towards Albury	Main Southern Line	Jerrawa towards Sydney
Location

Coolalie railway station was a railway station on the Main South railway line, serving the locality of Bango in New South Wales, Australia. It opened on 2 August 1891, but was relocated and rebuilt in 1914. It was closed to passenger services on 20 January 1975. It consisted of short 60 metre side platforms on each of the mainlines. The signal box survived for a time after the platforms were demolished, little trace of the station now survives.
