= Coppabella, New South Wales =

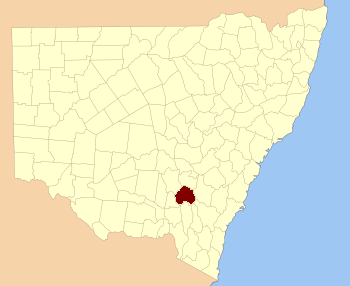
Harden County

Coppabella, New South Wales is a rural locality of Hilltops Council and a civil parish of Harden County, New South Wales.

The parish located at 34°44′54″S 148°30′04″E is on Coppabella and Juggion Creeks and the Hume Highway transverses to the southern boundary.
