= The No Hopers =

1961 play by Peter Batey

- Original language: English
- Written by: Peter Batey
- Genre: comedy

Premiere
- Date: June 1961
- Place: Perth

The No Hopers is a 1961 Australian play by Peter Batey. It was given support from the Elizabethan Theatre Trust at a time when that was rare for Australian plays. The play toured around Australia.

== Premise ==
A woman, Maggie, runs an outback pub with her no hoper husband. She has a romance with commercial traveller Joe.

== Initial production ==
The play premiered at The Playhouse Theatre in Perth on 7 June 1961 and later toured regional Western Australia with Union Theatre Repertory Company (now the Melbourne Theatre Company) and was presented in Melbourne in 1962.

=== Cast ===
- Joan MacArthur as Maggie O'Shaughnassy
- Bert Vickers as Mike O'Shaughnassy
- John Lenton as Joe Cook
- Margaret Ford as Edna Allnut
- Elspeth Ballantyne as Alma Hyland
- Brian Hannan as Archie Allnut
