= Bowning =

- Town
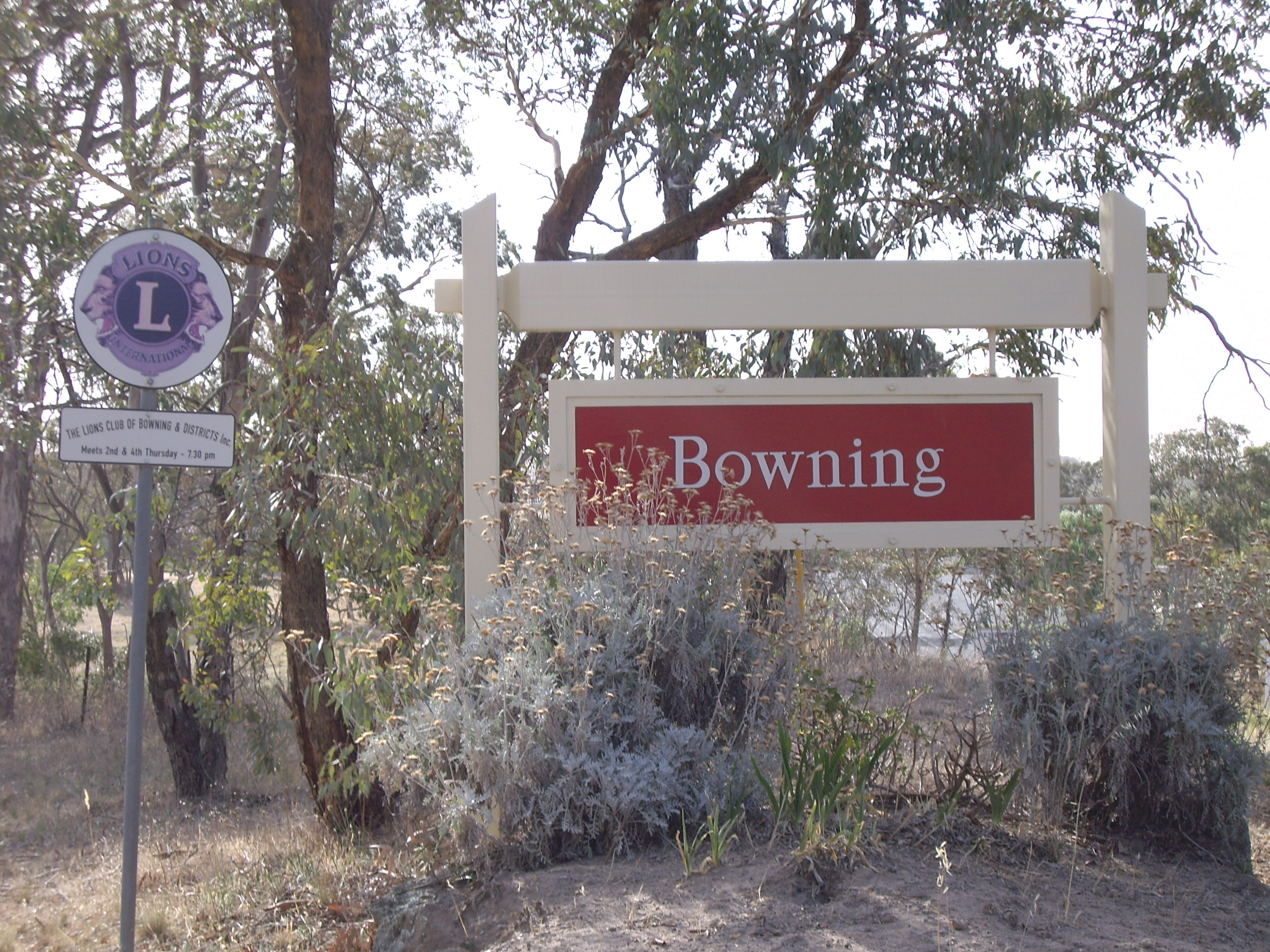
- Entering Bowning

- Interactive map of Bowning
- Coordinates: 34°43′57″S 148°48′02″E
- Country: Australia
- State: New South Wales
- LGA: Yass Valley Shire
- Location: 10 km (6.2 mi) ENE of Yass; 19 km (12 mi) WNW of Bookham; 95 km (59 mi) W of Goulburn; 89 km (55 mi) NE of Gundagai; 287 km (178 mi) WSW of Sydney

Government
  - State electorate: Goulburn
  - Federal division: Riverina
- Elevation: 602 m (1,975 ft)

Population
  - Total: 290 (UCL 2021)
- Postcode: 2582
Localities around Bowning
Binalong	Kangiara	Laverstock
Bookham	Bowning	Bango
Woolgarlo	Good Hope	Yass

Bowning is a small town in the South West Slopes, 14 kilometres (8.7 mi) west of Yass on the Hume Highway in Yass Valley Shire. Bowning is an aboriginal word meaning 'big hill'. At the 2016 census, Bowning and the surrounding area had a population of 573.

Nearby Bowning Hill is 796 metres (2,612 ft) AHD and Hume and Hovell mentioned it in their 1824 journal. Bowning was one of the earliest settlements in the district.

Historic buildings include the Troopers Cottage on the Binalong Road and the old Cobb and Co Coaching Station in Bogolong Street. The coaching station was built sometime between 1850 and 1870. The original local school was amongst the earliest established schools in inland New South Wales, founded in 1849, but now replaced.

== Railway ==
Bowning railway station is on the Main South railway line, and opened in 1876 consisting of two island platforms. The station closed in 1992; however, the structure is still largely intact with a double storey station building on the down platform (now a local craft shop).

== Heritage listings ==
Bowning has a number of heritage-listed sites, including:

- Main Southern railway: Bowning railway station

== Gallery ==
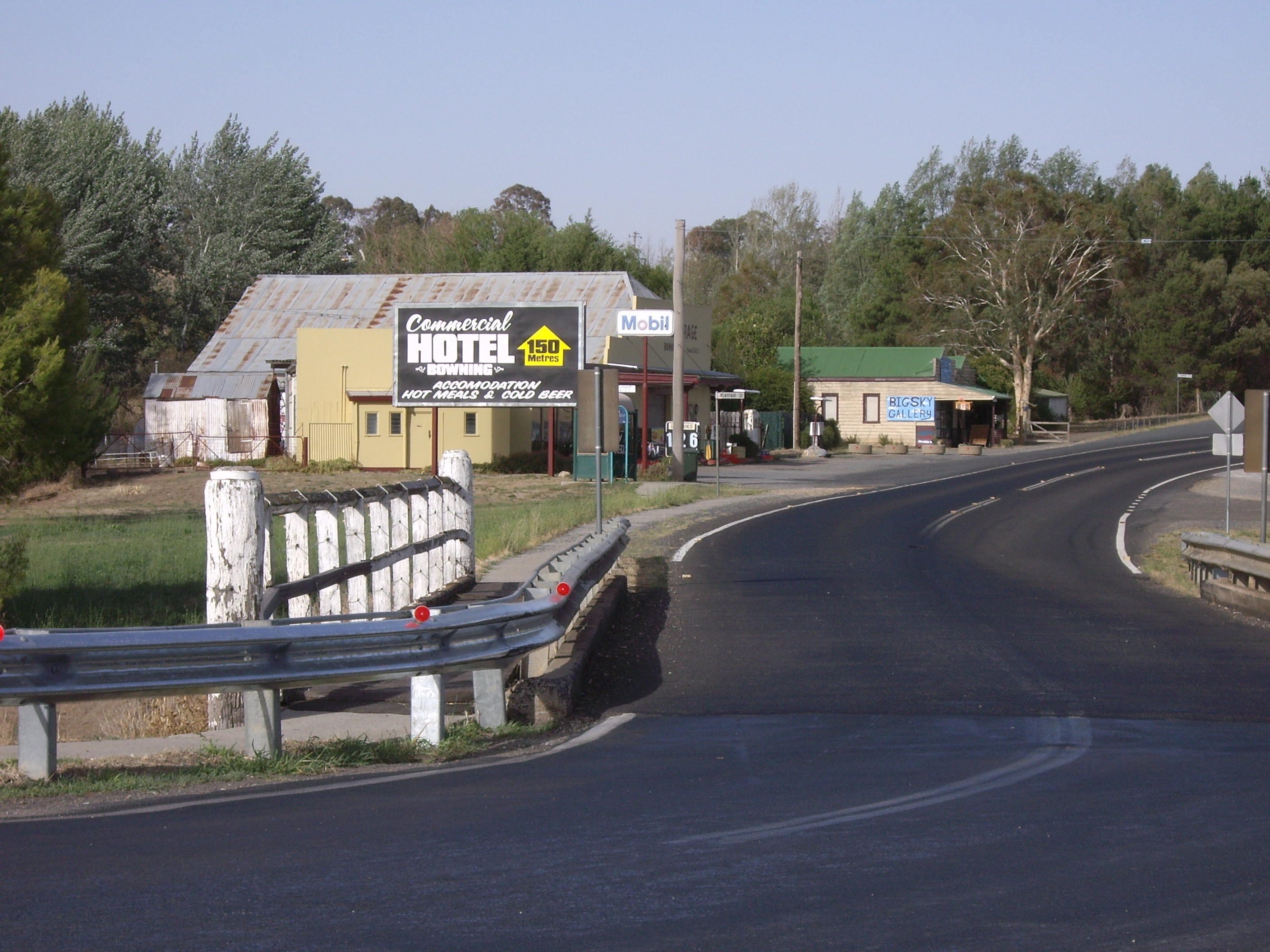
Part of Bowning township.

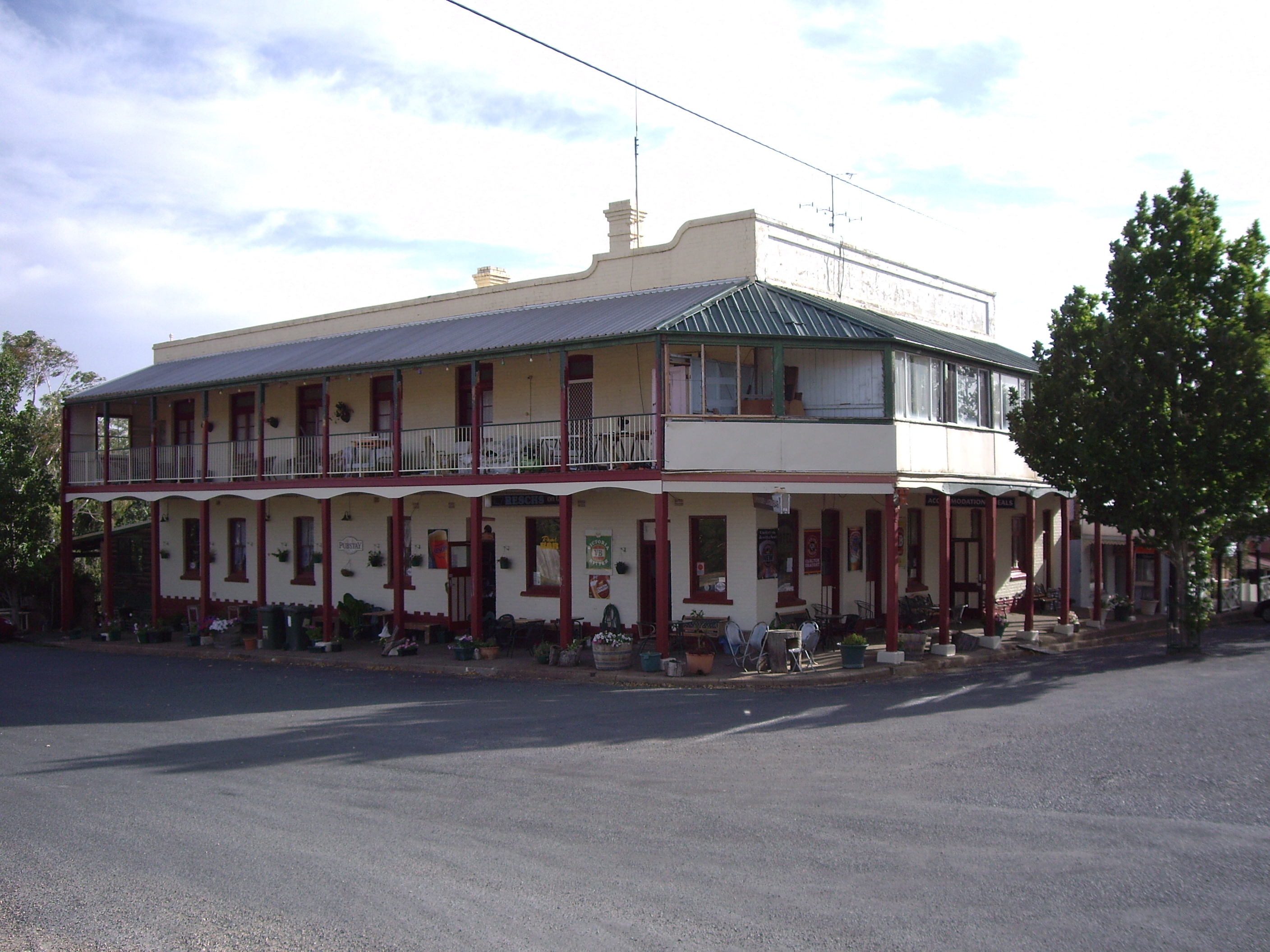
The Commercial Hotel.
