= Gobarralong =

- Town
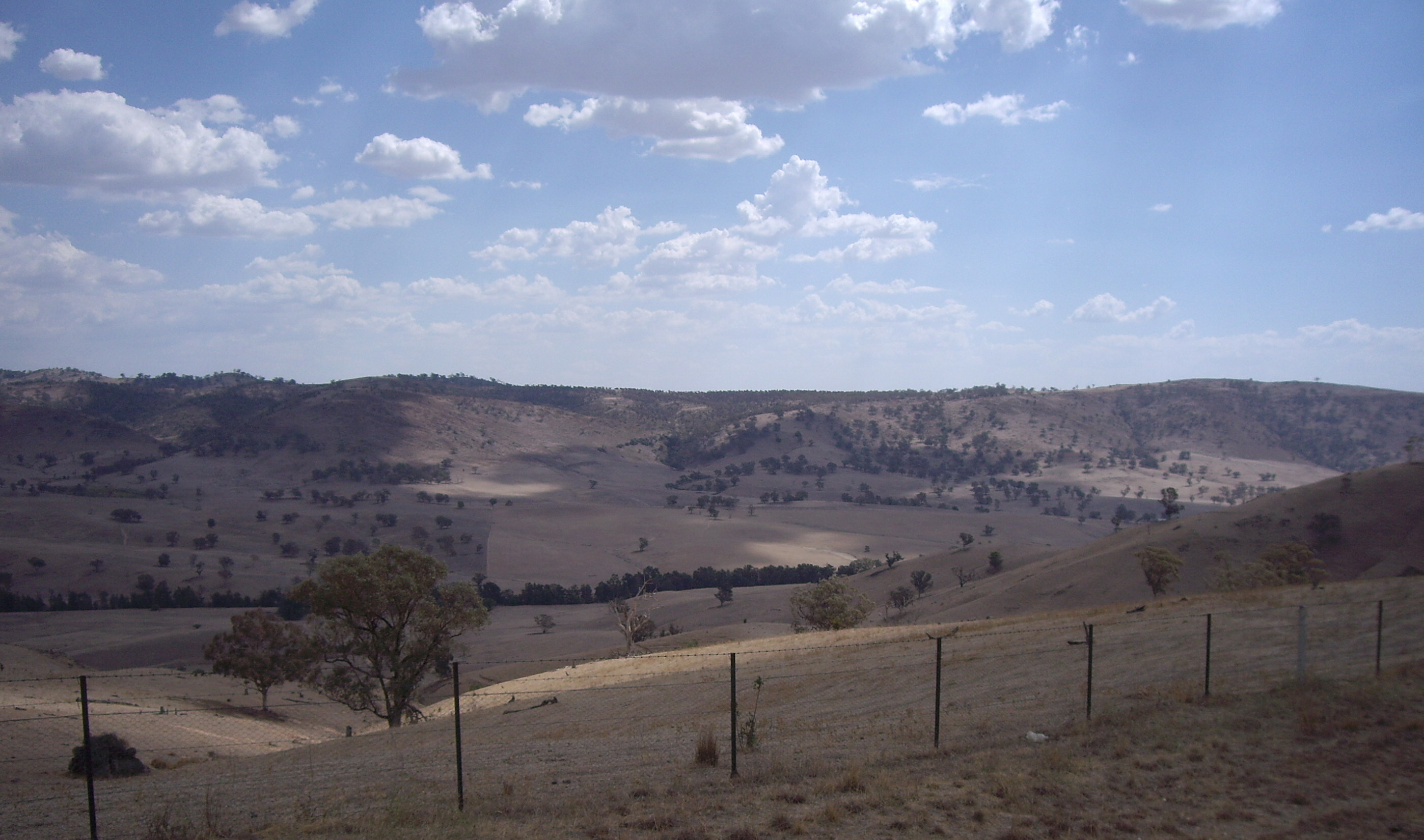
- Gobarralong Valley

- Coordinates: 35°2′8″S 148°19′28″E
- Country: Australia
- State: New South Wales
- LGA: Cootamundra-Gundagai Regional Council
- Location: 16 km (9.9 mi) from Coolac; 27 km (17 mi) from Adjungbilly

Government
  - State electorate: Cootamundra
  - Federal division: Riverina
- Elevation: 199 m (653 ft)

Population
  - Total: 63 (SAL 2021)
- Postcode: 2727
- County: Buccleuch

Gobarralong is a rural community in the central east part of the Riverina, Australia. It is situated about 16 kilometres southeast of Coolac and 27 kilometres northwest of Adjungbilly. At the 2016 census, Gobarralong and the surrounding area had a population of 52 people.

North Gobarralong Post Office opened on 1 November 1876, was renamed Gobarralong in 1909, and closed in 1967.
