= Adjungbilly =

- Town
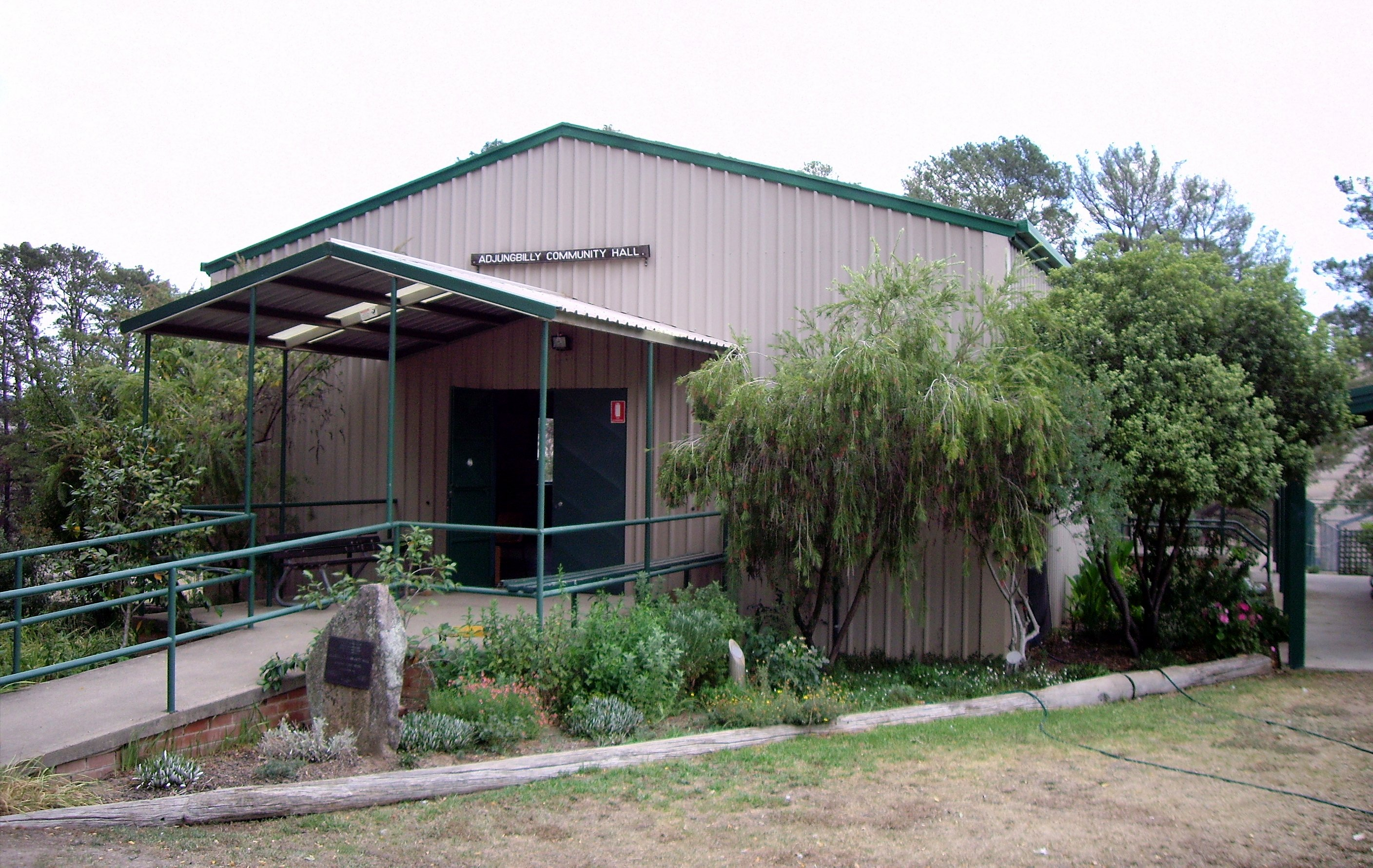
- Adjungbilly Community Hall

- Coordinates: 35°4′53″S 148°24′35″E
- Country: Australia
- State: New South Wales
- LGA: Cootamundra-Gundagai Regional Council
- Location: 367 km (228 mi) from Sydney; 129 km (80 mi) from Wagga Wagga; 35 km (22 mi) from Tumut; 29 km (18 mi) from Gobarralong

Government
  - State electorate: Cootamundra
  - Federal division: Riverina
- Elevation: 514 m (1,686 ft)

Population
  - Total: 101 (SAL 2021)
- Postcode: 2727
- County: Buccleuch
- Mean max temp: 19.2 °C (66.6 °F)
- Mean min temp: 6.5 °C (43.7 °F)
- Annual rainfall: 1,076.7 mm (42.39 in)

Adjungbilly is a rural community in the central east part of the Riverina and on the north-western edge of the Snowy Mountains. It is situated about 29 kilometres south-east of Gobarralong and 35 kilometres north-east of Tumut.

The (first) Tomooroma Post Office opened on 15 May 1896, was renamed Adjungbilly in 1899 and closed in 1974.

The area of Adjungbilly was originally referred to as Nadjongbilla, from the Wiradjuri word nadjong meaning water and billa meaning creek, therefore referring to the area's creek with its permanent water supply.

The area has a community hall and a small isolated primary school named the Bongongo Public School probably in relation to the nearby Bongongo Station.

== Climate ==
Owing to Adjungbilly's location in between the western plains of New South Wales and the dividing range, it varies greatly in maximum temperatures between seasons with a distinct winter rainfall peak. Falls of snow are not uncommon.

Climate data for Red Hill State Forest (1938–1970); 640 m AMSL; 35.17° S, 148.37° E
Month	Jan	Feb	Mar	Apr	May	Jun	Jul	Aug	Sep	Oct	Nov	Dec	Year
Mean daily maximum °C (°F)	28.7 (83.7)	27.8 (82.0)	25.1 (77.2)	19.5 (67.1)	14.5 (58.1)	11.1 (52.0)	10.0 (50.0)	11.7 (53.1)	15.3 (59.5)	18.6 (65.5)	21.9 (71.4)	26.3 (79.3)	19.2 (66.6)
Mean daily minimum °C (°F)	12.5 (54.5)	12.8 (55.0)	10.5 (50.9)	6.7 (44.1)	3.7 (38.7)	1.9 (35.4)	0.8 (33.4)	1.5 (34.7)	3.3 (37.9)	5.9 (42.6)	8.0 (46.4)	10.8 (51.4)	6.5 (43.7)
Average precipitation mm (inches)	73.3 (2.89)	56.1 (2.21)	76.1 (3.00)	78.6 (3.09)	108.3 (4.26)	96.5 (3.80)	117.0 (4.61)	118.9 (4.68)	91.5 (3.60)	105.3 (4.15)	85.1 (3.35)	70.0 (2.76)	1,076.7 (42.39)
Average precipitation days (≥ 0.2 mm)	6.5	5.9	6.3	8.1	11.8	12.9	14.5	15.2	11.5	12.1	9.2	7.5	121.5
Source: Australian Bureau of Meteorology; Red Hill State Forest
