= Coolac, New South Wales =

Coolac
- Town
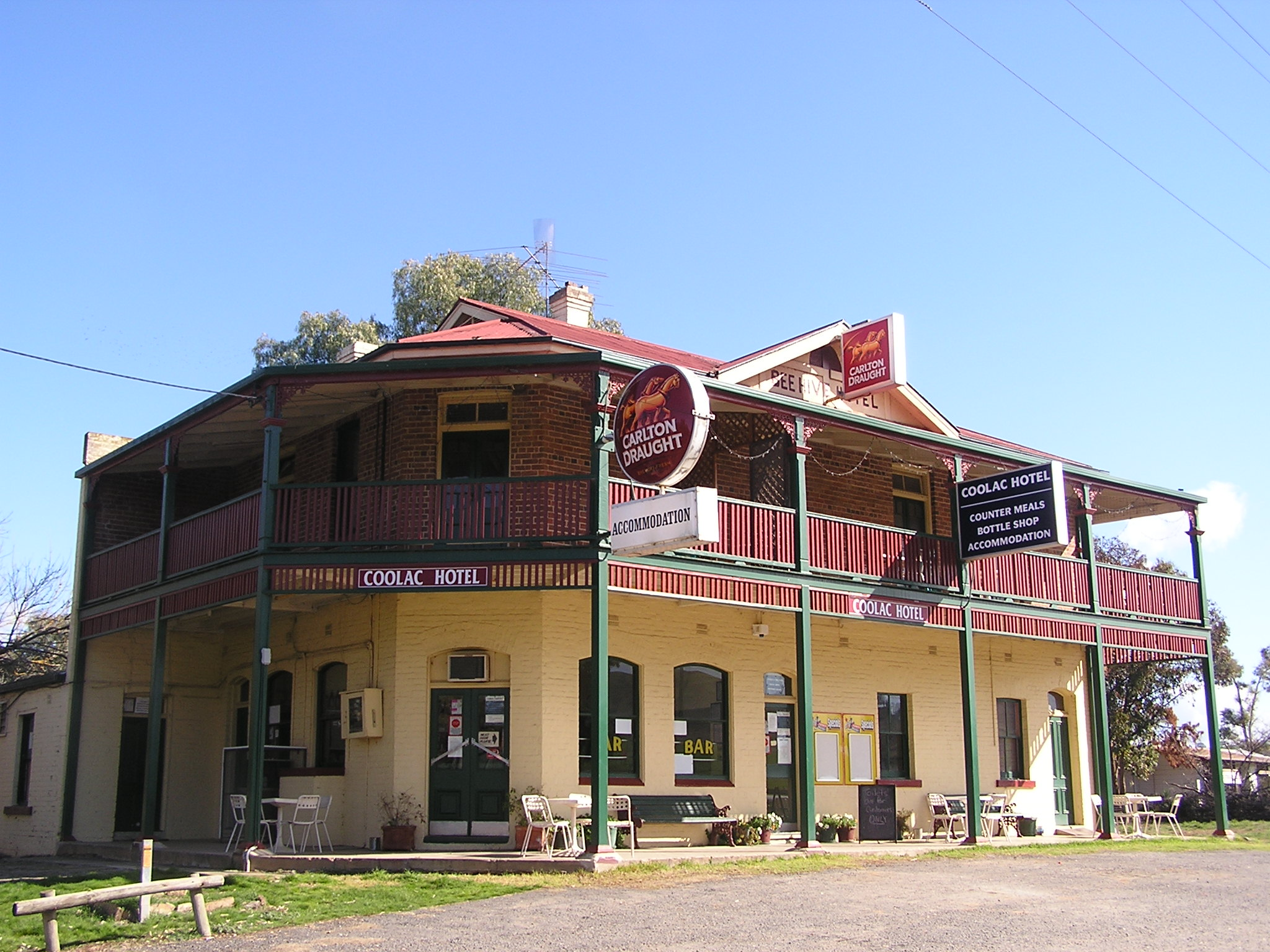
- Coolac Hotel, 2006

- Coordinates: 34°55′0″S 148°09′0″E
- Country: Australia
- State: New South Wales
- LGA: Cootamundra-Gundagai Regional Council
- Location: 353 km (219 mi) from Sydney; 103 km (64 mi) from Wagga Wagga; 21 km (13 mi) from Jugiong; 19 km (12 mi) from Gundagai
- Established: 1824

Government
  - State electorate: Cootamundra
  - Federal division: Riverina
- Elevation: 308 m (1,010 ft)

Population
  - Total: 244 (2021 census)
- Postcode: 2727
- County: Harden
- Mean max temp: 22.5 °C (72.5 °F)
- Mean min temp: 9.1 °C (48.4 °F)
- Annual rainfall: 636.2 mm (25.05 in)

Coolac is a village in the Riverina region of New South Wales, Australia in the Cootamundra-Gundagai Regional Council. At the 2021 census, Coolac had a population of 244.

== History ==
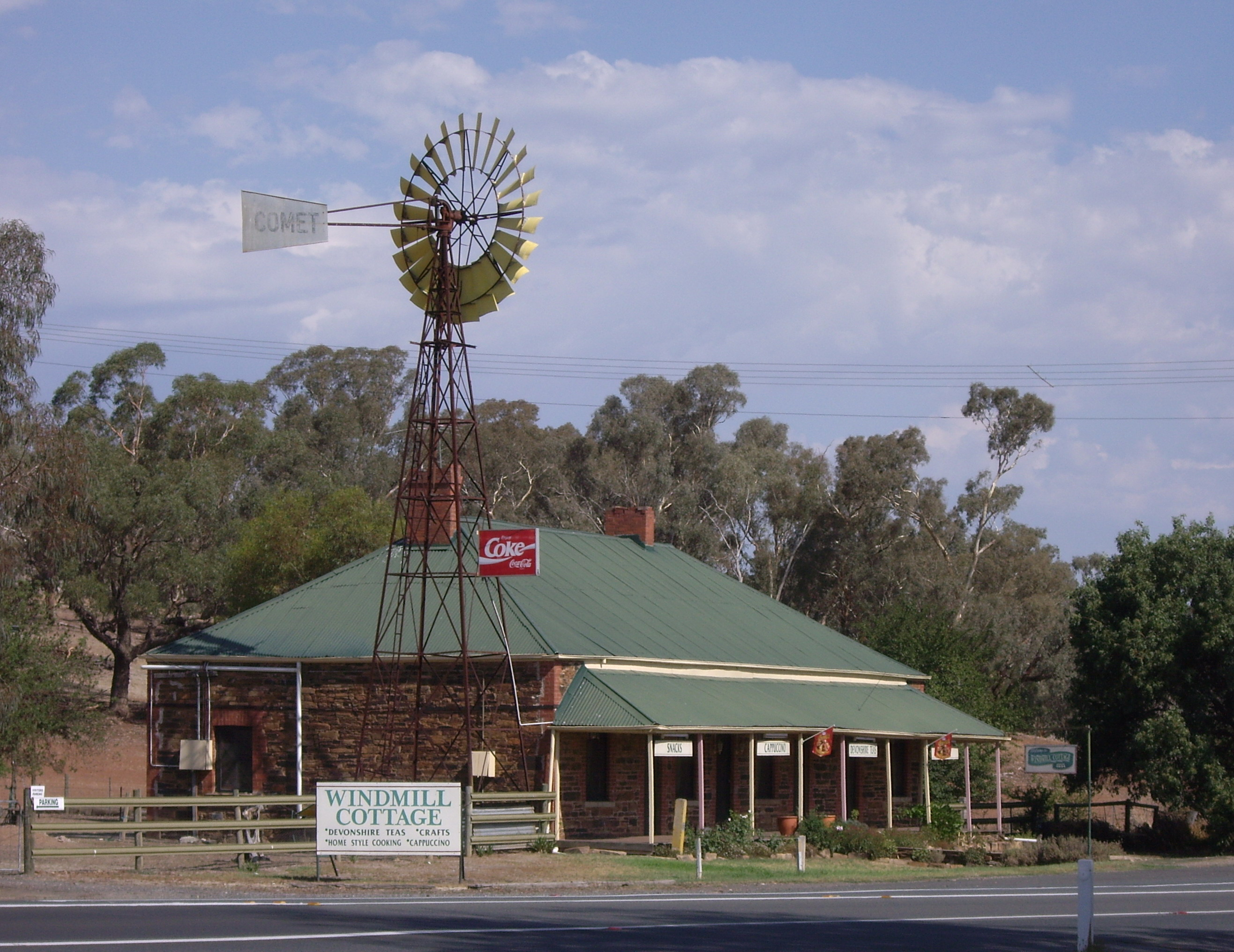
Windmill Cottage, Coolac, 2007

The name Coolac is derived from the local Aboriginal name for a plant which was abundant in the area, and also from the Aboriginal word meaning "native bear".

Coolac post office was opened on 1 June 1870. Coolac railway station was opened in June 1886, with the construction of a branch line from Cootamundra, which was eventually extended to Tumut. The station was closed in the 1970s.

The 11-kilometre section of the Hume Highway at Coolac was the last two-lane section of Hume Highway between Sydney and the Sturt Highway interchange. In the mid-1980s, plans were drawn-up for the Coolac bypass, and a review of environmental factors was completed in 1997. However, construction did not commence until May 2007 with the project completed in August 2009.

== Bald Archy ==
The satirical Bald Archy art competition (a parody of the name of the more prestigious Archibald Prize), was inaugurated by Peter Batey in 1994 at the Coolac Festival of Fun. The home of the competition is now the Museum of the Riverina in Wagga Wagga, and it also travels to Sydney and Melbourne for exhibition once Maude the Cockatoo, the official judge, selects the winning entries each year.

== Coolac Geological Site ==
The Coolac Geological Site, 48 kilometres (30 mi) north-east of Coolac, is the best-known example in Australia of a substantial ophiolite assemblage. The distinctive rock assemblage, covering 130 hectares (320 acres), provides insights into events in the continental evolution of eastern Australia. The rocks were part of the oceanic crust and mantle, not normally exposed on the Earth's surface. The rock from the mantle is called Coolac Serpentinite.
