= Jugiong Creek =

Jugiong Cumbamurra, Connors, Barbers, Talmo
- Location of the Jugiong Creek mouth in New South Wales

Location
- Country: Australia
- State: New South Wales
- Region: South Eastern Highlands (IBRA), South West Slopes
- LGAs: Yass Valley, Hilltops

Physical characteristics
- Source: Great Dividing Range
- Source confluence: Illalong Creek and Bogolong Creek
  - location: near Illalong Creek
  - coordinates: 34°36′23″S 148°43′29″E
  - elevation: 422 m (1,385 ft)
- Mouth: confluence with the Murrumbidgee River
  - location: east of Jugiong
  - coordinates: 34°49′36″S 148°22′14″E
  - elevation: 247 m (810 ft)
- Length: 58 km (36 mi)

Basin features
- River system: Murrumbidgee catchment, Murray–Darling basin
- Tributaries
  - right: Balgalal Creek, Rocky Ponds Creek, Cunningham Creek (Harden Shire)

The Jugiong Creek, a mostly–perennial river that is part of the Murrumbidgee catchment within the Murray–Darling basin, is located in the South West Slopes region of New South Wales, Australia.

== Course and features ==
Formed by the confluence of the Illalong and Bogolong Creeks, the Jugiong Creek (technically a river) rises in the Burrinjuck State Forest near the locality of llalong Creek, on the south western slopes of the Great Dividing Range. The creek flows generally north, west northwest and then southwest, joined by four minor tributaries, before reaching its confluence with the Murrumbidgee River east of the town of Jugiong. The creek descends 175 metres (574 ft) over its 58-kilometre (36 mi) course.

The creek is crossed by the Hume Highway near the river mouth.

== See also ==
- List of rivers of New South Wales (A-K)
- Rivers of New South Wales
