= Narromine County =

Narromine New South Wales
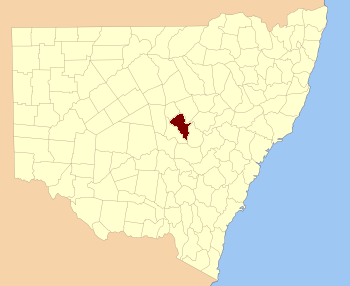
- Location in New South Wales
Lands administrative divisions around Narromine:
Oxley	Ewenmar	Lincoln
Kennedy	Narromine	Gordon
Kennedy	Kennedy	Gordon

Narromine County is one of the 141 cadastral divisions of New South Wales. It is located between the Bogan River on the west and the Macquarie River on the east, in the area around Narromine.

Narromine is believed to be derived from a local Aboriginal word.

== Parishes within this county ==
A full list of parishes found within this county; their current LGA and mapping coordinates to the approximate centre of each location is as follows:

Parish	LGA	Coordinates
Algalah	Narromine Shire	32°14′54″S 147°49′04″E
Backwater	Narromine Shire	32°13′54″S 148°08′04″E
Barton	Narromine Shire	32°10′54″S 147°53′04″E
Biridoo	Narromine Shire	32°32′54″S 148°21′04″E
Buddah	Narromine Shire	32°05′54″S 148°10′04″E
Bulgandramine	Narromine Shire	32°37′54″S 148°12′04″E
Burrabadine	Dubbo Regional Council	32°12′54″S 148°30′04″E
Caloma	Narromine Shire	32°38′54″S 148°18′04″E
Cathundril	Narromine Shire	32°05′54″S 146°42′04″E
Cowal	Narromine Shire	32°12′54″S 148°00′04″E
Dandaloo	Narromine Shire	32°10′54″S 147°41′04″E
Deribong	Narromine Shire	32°11′54″S 147°47′04″E
Doonside	Narromine Shire	32°14′54″S 147°53′04″E
Draggy	Narromine Shire	32°22′54″S 147°52′04″E
Dungary	Dubbo Regional Council	32°17′54″S 148°28′04″E
Enerweena	Narromine Shire	32°26′54″S 147°58′04″E
Enmore	Narromine Shire	32°05′54″S 147°48′04″E
Frost	Narromine Shire	32°21′54″S 148°10′04″E
Gilmour	Narromine Shire	32°33′54″S 148°05′04″E
Gin Gin	Narromine Shire	32°00′54″S 148°03′04″E
Gin Gin	Warren Shire	31°55′54″S 147°58′04″E
Goan	Narromine Shire	32°03′54″S 148°00′04″E
Gradell	Narromine Shire	32°30′54″S 148°03′04″E
Gundong	Narromine Shire	32°33′56″S 148°12′46″E
Hervey	Parkes Shire	32°42′54″S 148°17′04″E
Meringo	Narromine Shire	31°59′54″S 147°46′04″E
Mingelo	Parkes Shire	32°47′54″S 148°11′04″E
Minore	Dubbo Regional Council	32°11′54″S 148°25′04″E
Momo	Narromine Shire	32°24′54″S 148°21′04″E
Mullah Back	Narromine Shire	31°59′54″S 147°56′04″E
Mullah	Narromine Shire	31°53′54″S 147°56′04″E
Myall Camp	Narromine Shire	32°20′54″S 148°04′04″E
Narromine	Narromine Shire	32°17′54″S 148°20′04″E
Nelson	Narromine Shire	32°21′54″S 148°00′04″E
Obley	Narromine Shire	32°21′54″S 148°16′04″E
Temoin	Narromine Shire	32°06′54″S 147°56′04″E
The Oaks	Narromine Shire	32°30′54″S 148°09′04″E
Timbrebongie	Narromine Shire	32°10′54″S 148°09′04″E
Tomingley	Narromine Shire	32°29′54″S 148°16′04″E
Trangie	Narromine Shire	32°02′54″S 147°53′04″E
Turribung	Narromine Shire	32°14′54″S 147°41′04″E
Tyrie	Narromine Shire	32°08′54″S 147°36′04″E
Waterloo	Narromine Shire	32°22′54″S 147°45′04″E
Weemabah	Narromine Shire	32°00′54″S 148°11′04″E
Wentworth	Narromine Shire	32°13′54″S 148°15′04″E
Willydah	Narromine Shire	32°07′54″S 148°00′04″E
Yarradigerie	Narromine Shire	32°11′54″S 147°32′04″E
