= Narromine News =

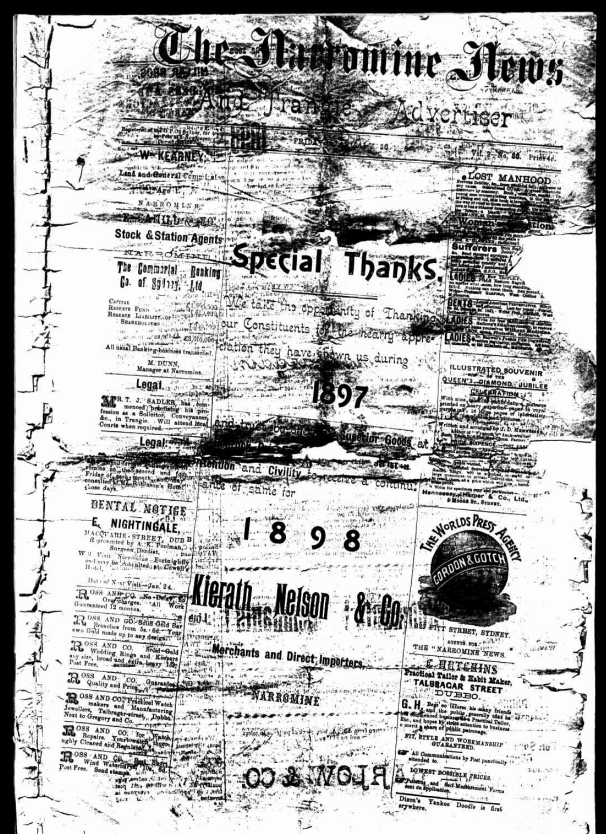
Front cover of the Narromine News and Trangie Advocate on 28 January 1898

The Narromine News was a newspaper published bi-weekly in Narromine, New South Wales, Australia. It was published as the Narromine News and Trangie Advocate from 1896 to 1979 when its name was changed to the Narromine News.

== History ==
The Narromine News and Trangie Advocate was first published in 1896 by Clifford Stanford Harry Bulstrode Whitelocke. It ceased publication on Wednesday, 25 July 1979, and was continued by The Narromine News, published by Narromine News. The paper was circulated across Narromine, Trangie, Nevertire, Tottenham, and Tomingley.

The Narromine News was one of the print mastheads owned by Australian Community Media included in an announcement "that the company would temporarily suspend the print editions (of) non-daily newspapers" in mid-April 2020. The print edition ceased, however the company continues to maintain an online news website under the same masthead.

== Digitisation ==
Part of this paper has been digitised as part of the Australian Newspapers Digitisation Program project of the National Library of Australia.

== See also ==
- List of newspapers in Australia
- List of newspapers in New South Wales
