= Parish of Bulgandramine =

Bulgandramine is a rural cadastral parish in Narromine County, NSW, approximately 370 km north west from Sydney, west of Trangie. It is within the Narromine Council area at 32°37′54″S 148°12′04″E. Bulganramine is 239 m above sea level.

The parish is located on the Bogan River, to the west of the town of Tomingley, New South Wales. The Parkes–Narromine railway line passes through Bulgandramine and the Tomingley West railway station services the district, although passenger services are currently only available as far as Parkes.

The traditional owners of the district were Wiradjuri people, who named it Bulganramine, an Aboriginal word meaning 'Aboriginal holding a boomerang'.

During the 20th century there was an Aboriginal mission at Bulgandramine. The post code is 2869.

In the 2006 Australian Census, 1,281 people claimed residence at Bulgandramine and the average age was 41 years; the average inhabitant earned an average weekly gross income of around $275 per week, with the major industries being agriculture, forestry and fishing.
