= Parish of Enerweena =

NSW parish

Enerweena is a rural cadastral parish in Narromine County NSW, located at 32°26′54″S 147°58′04″ approximately 370 km north west from Sydney, about 15 km north east of Albert and about 40 km south west of Trangie. It is within the Narromine Council area at 32°37′54″S 148°12′04″E.

It is in Narromine Shire.
