= Parish of Doonside =

Doonside
- Cadastral division
- Coordinates: 32°21′S 147°30′E
- Country: Australia
- State: New South Wales
- LGA: Narromine Shire

Government
  - State electorate: Barwon
  - Federal division: Parkes
- Postcode: 2873
- County: Narromine County

The parish of Doonside is an Australian cadastral parish in the NSW county of Narromine. It is located approximately midway between Tottenham and Narromine and is in Narromine Shire. The parish should not be confused with the western Sydney suburb of Doonside.

Approx 32°14′54″S 147°53′04″E
