= Parish of Gundong =

Gundong Parish is a civil parish of Narromine County, New South Wales located at 32°33′56″S 148°12′46″E south of Narromine, New South Wales

The cargo transporting Parkes–Narromine railway line passes through Gundong Parish with a(disused) station at Tomingley West railway stations.

The traditional owners of the district were Wiradjuri people. The economy of Gundong Parish is mainly based on broad acre agriculture. including sheep, cattle and wheat. The only town of the parish is Tomingley, New South Wales
