= Parish of Timbrebongie =

Coordinates: 32°07′S 148°15′E

Timbrebongie is a cadastral parish and former village on the Macquarie River to the north of Narromine township in New South Wales, Australia. and Buddah in the county of Ewenmar and is in Narromine Shire. The area is located 11.75km north of Narromine, 26.61 km south east of Trangie and about 340 km northwest of Sydney, New South Wales.

Early exploration of the Macquarie River area was conducted variously by John Oxley, Charles Sturt and Hamilton Hume and in 1835 William Charles Wentworth took the first run in the district. Buddah Parish is named for another run Buddah Homestead built in the 1830s and by 1866 the first hotel licence for new “village of Timbrebongie” was issued. Within a short while the village had two churches, and a post office.

The topography is flat and predominantly cleared of vegetation, with Timbrebongie Falls, and the Macquarie River the main geographic features.

The Main Western Railway line passes through the parish of Timbrebongie.
