= Parish of Algalah =

Algalah
- Town
- Coordinates: 32°21′S 147°30′E
- Country: Australia
- State: New South Wales
- LGA: Narromine Shire

Government
  - State electorate: Barwon
  - Federal division: Parkes
- Postcode: 2873

The parish of Algalah is an Australian cadastral parish in the NSW county of Narromine. It is located 367km west north west from Sydney approximately midway between Tottenham and Narromine and is in Narromine Shire, at 32°14′54″S 147°49′04″E.

The area is predominantly agricultural and significant geographic features include the Bogan River and Bullock Tank Swamp.

The parish is named for the Algalah Run Sheep station that occupied the majority of the parish, and which was founded by Robert John Walker who is reputed to have moved a World Record Wagon load of wool to the local railway station with a single Shire stallion. Walkers' business partner Andrew Taylor Kerr founded "Deribong run" after which the neighbouring parish of Deribong is named.

== Gallery ==
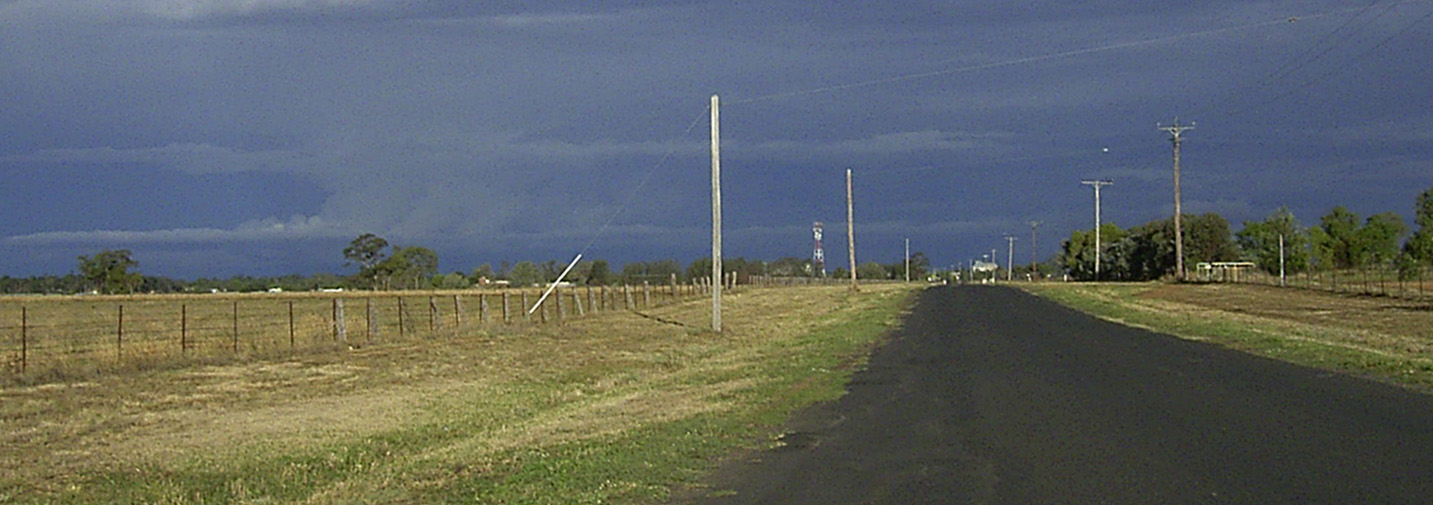
Farmland northern Algalah

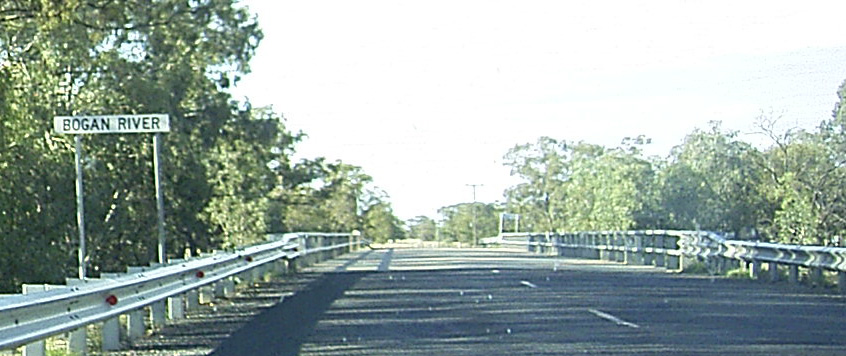
Bogan River on the Dandaloo-Trangie Road, near Algalah
