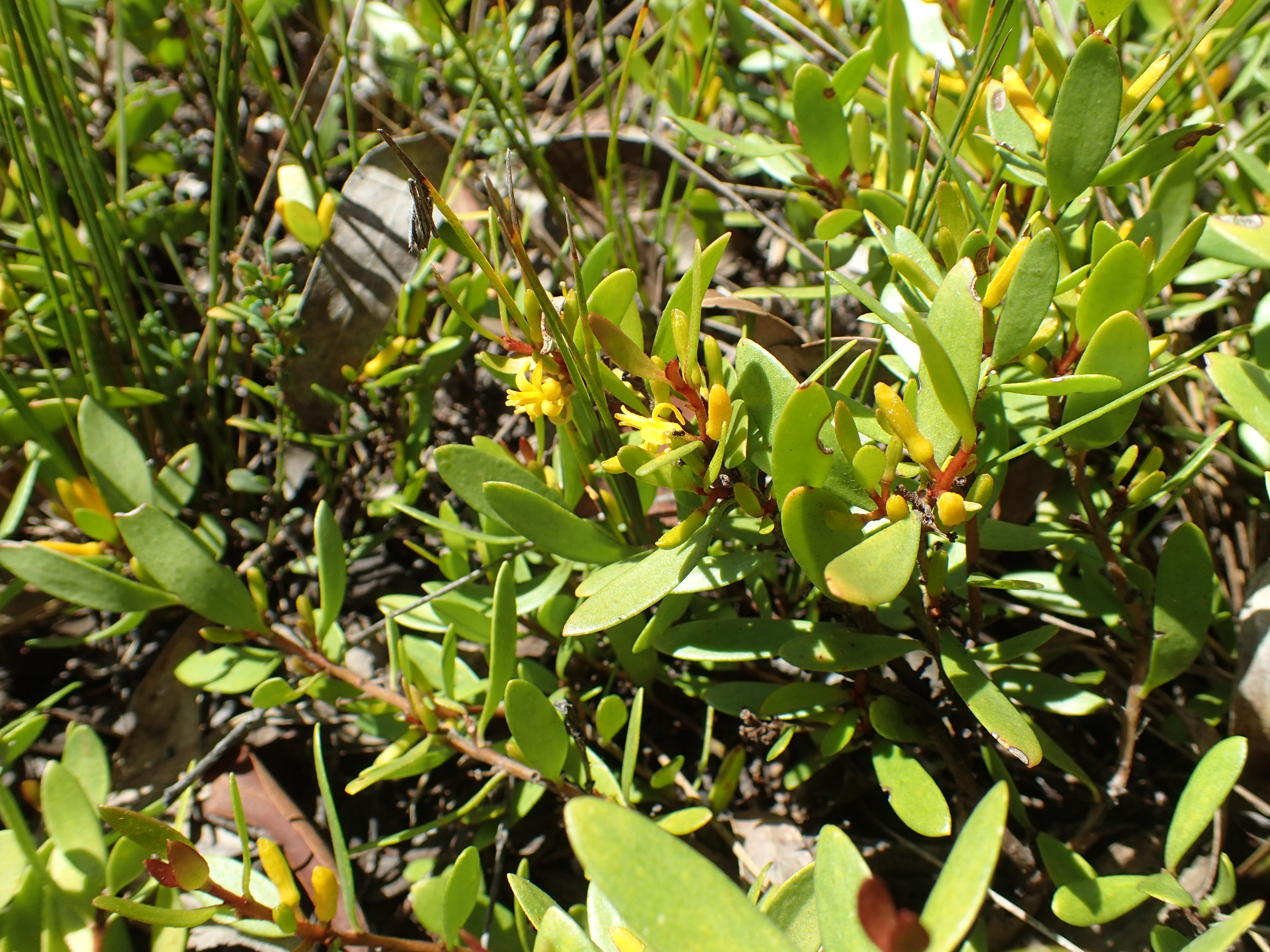
- Foliage and flowers

Conservation status
- Near Threatened (IUCN 3.1)

Scientific classification
- Kingdom: Plantae
- Clade: Embryophytes
- Clade: Tracheophytes
- Clade: Angiosperms
- Clade: Eudicots
- Order: Proteales
- Family: Proteaceae
- Genus: Persoonia
- Species: P. procumbens

Binomial name
- Persoonia procumbens L.A.S.Johnson & P.H.Weston

= Persoonia procumbens =

Species of shrub

Persoonia procumbens is a plant in the family Proteaceae and is endemic to part of the New England Tableland, Australia. It is a prostrate shrub with rather fleshy, relatively large leaves and small groups of cylindrical yellow flowers. It is similar to P. daphnoides but has darker hairs on the young branches and smaller, less hairy flowers.

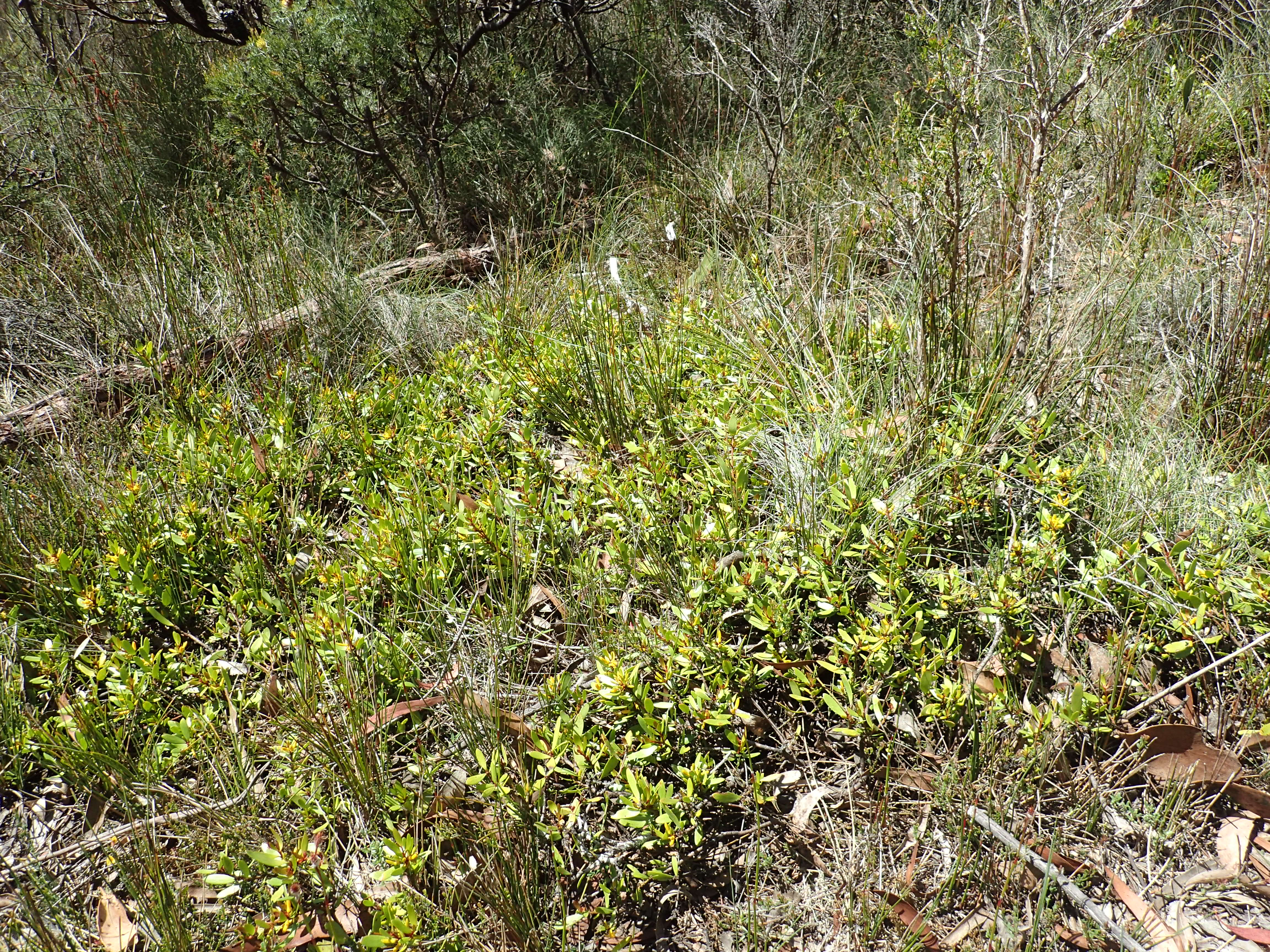
P. procumbens in Cathedral Rock National Park

== Description ==
Persoonia procumbens is a prostrate shrub which grows to a height of 10 cm (4 in) and has its young branches covered with rust-coloured hairs which are more or less pressed against the stem. The leaves are flat, spoon-shaped, wedge-shaped or egg-shaped with the narrower end towards the base. They are 15–36 mm (0.6–1 in) long, 4–17 mm (0.2–0.7 in) wide, have a few hairs when young but are glabrous when mature. The flowers are yellow and arranged singly or in groups of up to six on a rachis up to 10 mm (0.4 in) long. Each flower has an erect pedicel 1.5–3 mm (0.06–0.1 in) long which is covered with rust-coloured hairs. The flower is composed of four tepals 7–9 mm (0.3–0.4 in) long, which are fused at the base but with the tips rolled back. The central style is surrounded by four yellow anthers which are also joined at the base with the tips rolled back, so that it resembles a cross when viewed end-on. Flowering occurs from December to January and is followed by fruit which are green drupes.

== Taxonomy and naming ==
Persoonia procumbens was first formally described in 1991 by Peter Weston and Lawrie Johnson from a specimen collected near the turnoff from the Waterfall Way to the New England National Park. The description was published in the journal Telopea. The specific epithet (procumbens) is a Latin word meaning "prostrate" or "face downward", referring to the habit of this species. The species was formerly described as Persoonia prostrata subsp. C.

== Distribution and habitat ==
This persoonia grows in woodland and forest near granite between Ebor and Backwater on the New England Tableland. The species has a ROTAP listing as "2RC-", meaning that it is rare but protected in a conservation reserve.

Within Warra National Park, it is found in two woodland plant communities, both on damp sand and sandy loam.

== Use in horticulture ==
Persoonia procumbens has been grown readily in temperate climates. It prefers a well-drained soil in the garden, responds well to pruning and has horticultural potential as a rockery plant.
