= Parish of Weemabah =

Weemabah is a civil parish of Narromine County located at 32°00′54″S 148°11′04″E, a cadastral division of New South Wales.

Weemabah is on the Macquarie River north of Narromine, New South Wales.
