= Parish of Frost =

Frost Parish is a civil parish of Narromine County, New South Wales

Frost Parish is on Yellow Creek, south of Narromine, New South Wales and is located at 32°13′54″S 148°08′04″E.

The cargo transporting Parkes–Narromine railway line passes through Frost Parish with two (disused) stations at Fairview and Narwonah railway stations.

The economy of Frost Parish is mainly based on broad acre agriculture including sheep, cattle and wheat.
