= Dandaloo =

- Town
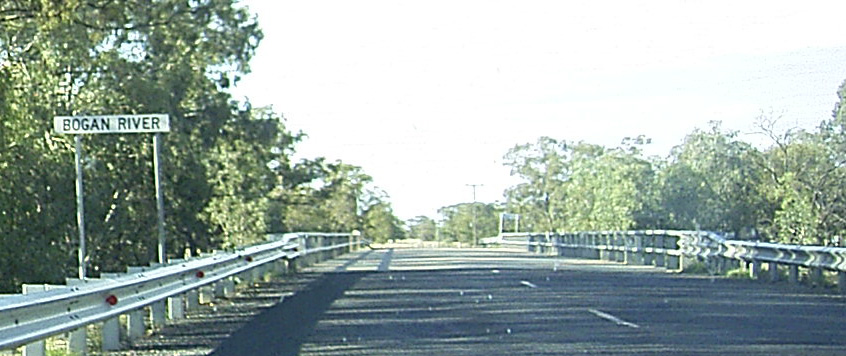
- Bogan River on the Dandaloo-Trangie Road, Dandaloo.

- Coordinates: 32°21′S 147°30′E
- Country: Australia
- State: New South Wales
- LGA: Narromine Shire

Government
  - State electorate: Barwon
  - Federal division: Parkes

Population
  - Total: 37 (2016 census)
- Postcode: 2873

Dandaloo is a rural locality in New South Wales, approximately 370 km north west from Sydney, about 15 km north east of Albert and about 40 km south west of Trangie. It is within the Narromine Council area.

The locality was named by local landowner Florent Martel after a town in France, and is the subject of the Banjo Paterson poem "An Idyll of Dandaloo".

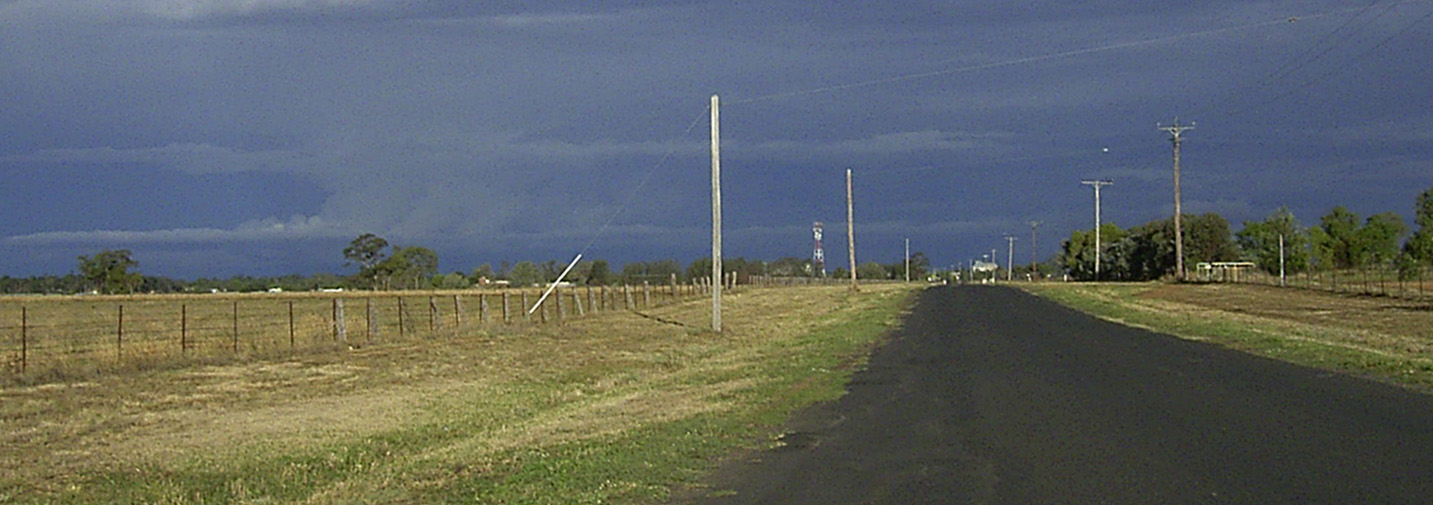
Dandaloo Rd

During the colonial era a village of Dandaloo was proposed where the Trangie-Melrose Road crosses the Bogan River. Although subdivision commenced, the proposal was revoked in June 1895 and the town site remains largely paddocks to this day, although a few houses, a church graveyard and disused post office building are scattered across the area.

During the Second World War, the Royal Australian Air Force built a satellite airfield seventeen kilometres west-north-west of its Elementary Flying Training School at RAAF Station Narromine. Known as RAAF Dandaloo, the former comprised a single 5,000' east-west gravel runway (and eight hideouts) with no other permanent above-ground structures. The site (32°10'60.00"S 148° 4'30.00"E) has since reverted to cultivation.

In 2006 Dandaloo had around 365 people, with the major industry being agriculture, forestry & fishing.
