= Gin Gin, New South Wales =

Gin Gin
- Town
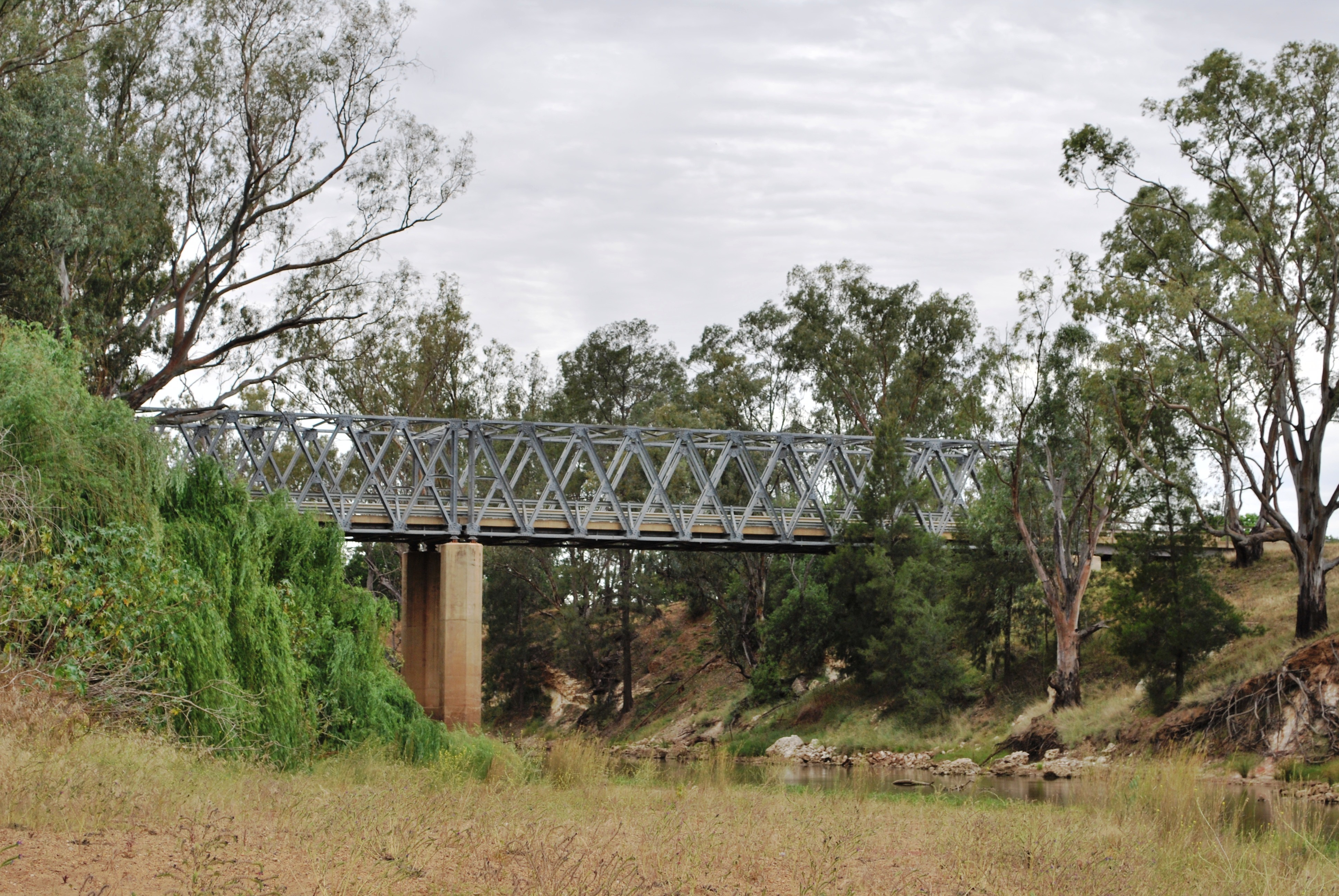
- Bridge over the Macquarie River at Gin Gin

- Coordinates: 31°55′0″S 148°05′0″E
- Country: Australia
- State: New South Wales
- LGA: Narromine Shire

Government
  - State electorate: Barwon
  - Federal division: Parkes

Population
  - Total: 159 (2021 census)
- Postcode: 2823

Gin Gin is a small town in New South Wales, Australia. It is located within the Narromine Shire local government area, just north-east of Trangie, New South Wales. At the 2026 census, Gin Gin had a population of 159.

== See also ==
- List of reduplicated Australian place names
