= Statue of Glenn McGrath =

2009 statue by Brett Garling

Glenn McGrath
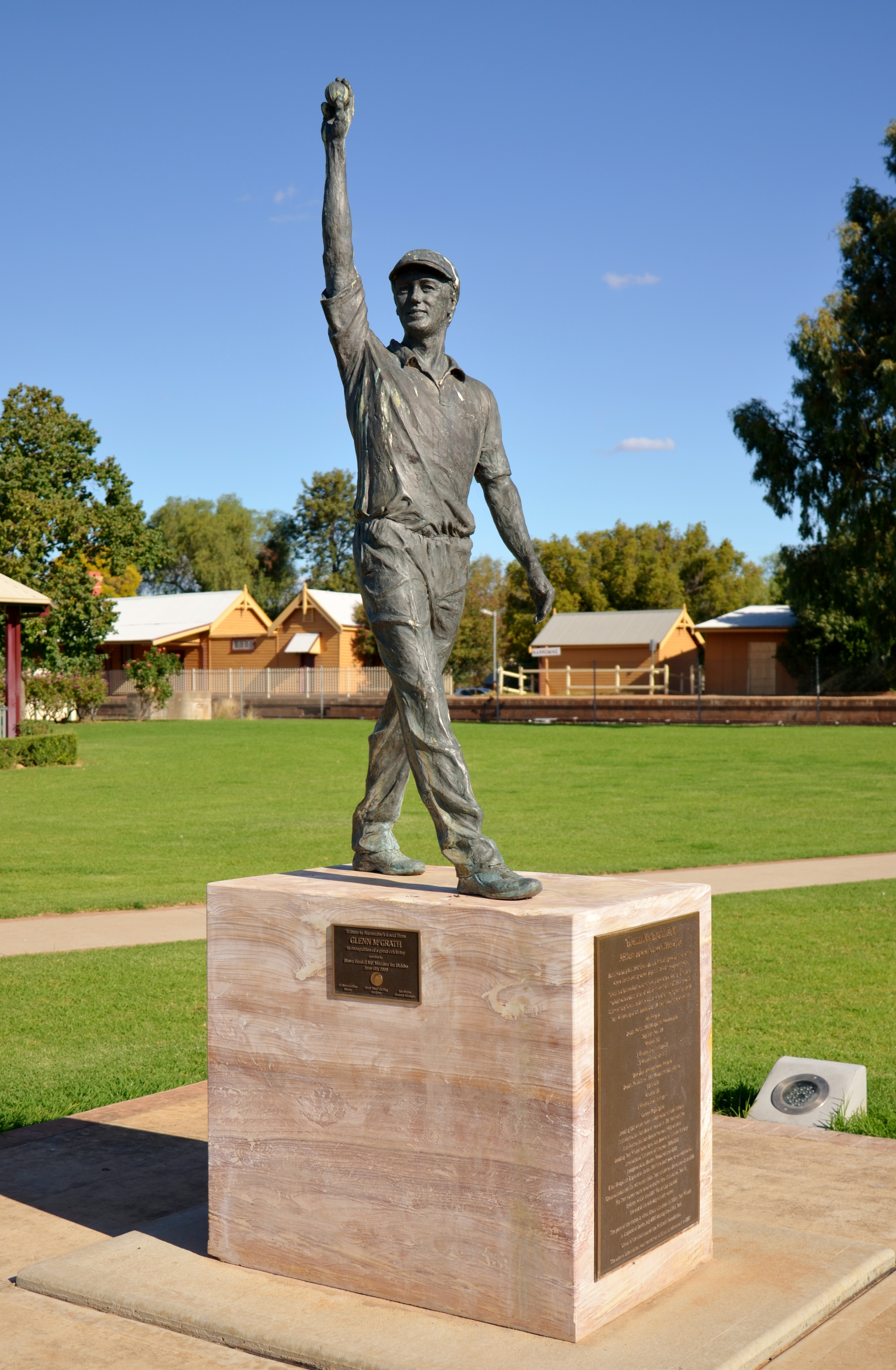
- Artist: Brett "Mon" Garling
- Year: 2009
- Medium: Bronze
- Location: Narromine, Australia; 32°13′59.8″S 148°14′24″E

Glenn McGrath is a 2009 statue by artist Brett "Mon" Garling. The work is installed in Tom Perry Park in Narromine, a town in the Orana region of New South Wales, Australia. The statue commemorates former Australian Test cricketer, Glenn McGrath. McGrath grew up in Narromine where he first played cricket. He is fifth on the all-time test wickets list.

The statue was commissioned by Narromine Shire Council at a cost of $70,000. The statue was unveiled on 6 June 2009 in the presence of both McGrath and Premier of New South Wales Nathan Rees.
