= Parish of Meringo (Narromine County) =

Coordinates: 35.980420°S 150.136387°E

Meringo is a civil parish of Narromine County in central New South Wales.

The nearest town is Trangie. Meringo is on the Main Western railway line, New South Wales between Cathundral and Myall Mundi railway sidings.
