= Trewilga =

- Suburb
- Interactive map of Trewilga
- Coordinates: 32°47′11″S 148°13′47″E
- Country: Australia
- State: New South Wales
- LGA: Parkes Shire
- Location: 401 km (249 mi) WNW of Sydney; 79 km (49 mi) SSW of Dubbo; 41 km (25 mi) N of Parkes
- Established: 1889

Government
  - State electorate: Orange
  - Federal division: Calare

Population
  - Total: 24 (SAL 2021)
- Time zone: UTC+10 (AEST)
  - Summer (DST): UTC+11 (AEDT)
- Postcode: 2869
- County: Narromine
- Parish: Mingelo

Trewilga is a bounded rural locality in Parkes Shire, within the Central West region of New South Wales, Australia. There was once a village and railway station of the same name. Prior to 1913, the village was known as Mingelo.

== Location ==
Trewilga is approximately 401 km (249 mi) west-northwest of Sydney. The nearest settlement is Peak Hill, which lies 7.4 km away, to the north-north-west.

== History ==
=== Aboriginal and early settler history ===
The area later known as Trewilga lies on the traditional lands of Wiradjuri people. An Aboriginal basalt quarry site has been identified near Trewilga and bi-facial choppers, numerous broken choppers, and stone flakes were recorded there. There is a significant Wiradjuri population in the nearby town of Peak Hill.

The name Trewilga was that of an early settler selection in the area.

The area was opened up in the Australian Gold Rush, but mining in the area seems to have commenced in the 1880s and had its heyday in the first three decades of the 20th century, when quartz reefs were mined in the area. In the early 1890s there appears to have been a crushing battery there but, later, the quartz was transported to nearby Peak Hill to be crushed,

=== Village history ===
A village was gazetted in 1889. The village was originally known as Mingelo. A school opened in January 1892. The post office was renamed Trewiliga in 1905, and the school in 1912. However, the village itself was not officially renamed Trewilga, until 1913, in time for the opening of its new railway station in 1914. Some land was sold to the west of the original village, just east of the new railway station. There was a siding there that was used for the loading of bagged wheat.

A cemetery was dedicated to the north-west of the village. The village's Anglican church was erected in 1925. The village had a hotel, known as the Mingelo Hotel, in 1905, and opposite it was a racecourse, the venue for occasional horse racing events. The hotel burned to the ground in a fire in 1909 and its licence was subsequently cancelled; it was not rebuilt. At its peak, the village probably had about forty houses.

By 1926, Trewilga's days as a mining village seemed to be over and it was described as "just a small place consisting of a Post and Telegraph Office, a few private residences and a tennis court, Public School, Hall, and English Church".

The school was destroyed by fire on 5 February 1951. Trewilga railway station closed in 1974 and its post office closed in 1976. The Village of Trewilga ceased to exist officially, in 1979, when its name was discontinued by the Geographical Names Board of N.S.W.

=== Surrounding area ===
During the First World War, an estate known as 'Harvey Park', three miles from Trewilga railway station—in the neighbouring County of Kennedy—was sub-divided into 22 farms as part of the Soldier Settlement program.

Some of the men placed on the soldier settlement farms had lost limbs as the result of wounds in battle but, after receiving artificial limbs, worked their farms themselves. The new farms were not viable and many soldier settlers walked off their land, thereby forfeiting both the land and the cost of any improvements they had made.

== Present day ==
Today mining remains an important feature of the community with twenty mines in the district. The area is however, predominantly agricultural. Two streets of the old village, Parkes and Tomingley Streets, still appear on maps, as do allotments within the site of the former village. The modern-day Newell Highway now bypasses the site of the old village and it instead runs closer to the alignment of the Parkes-Narrowmine railway line, near to where the old Trewilga station once stood.

Goobang National Park lies to the east of the locality.
