= Glenn McGrath =

Australian cricketer

Glenn McGrath AO
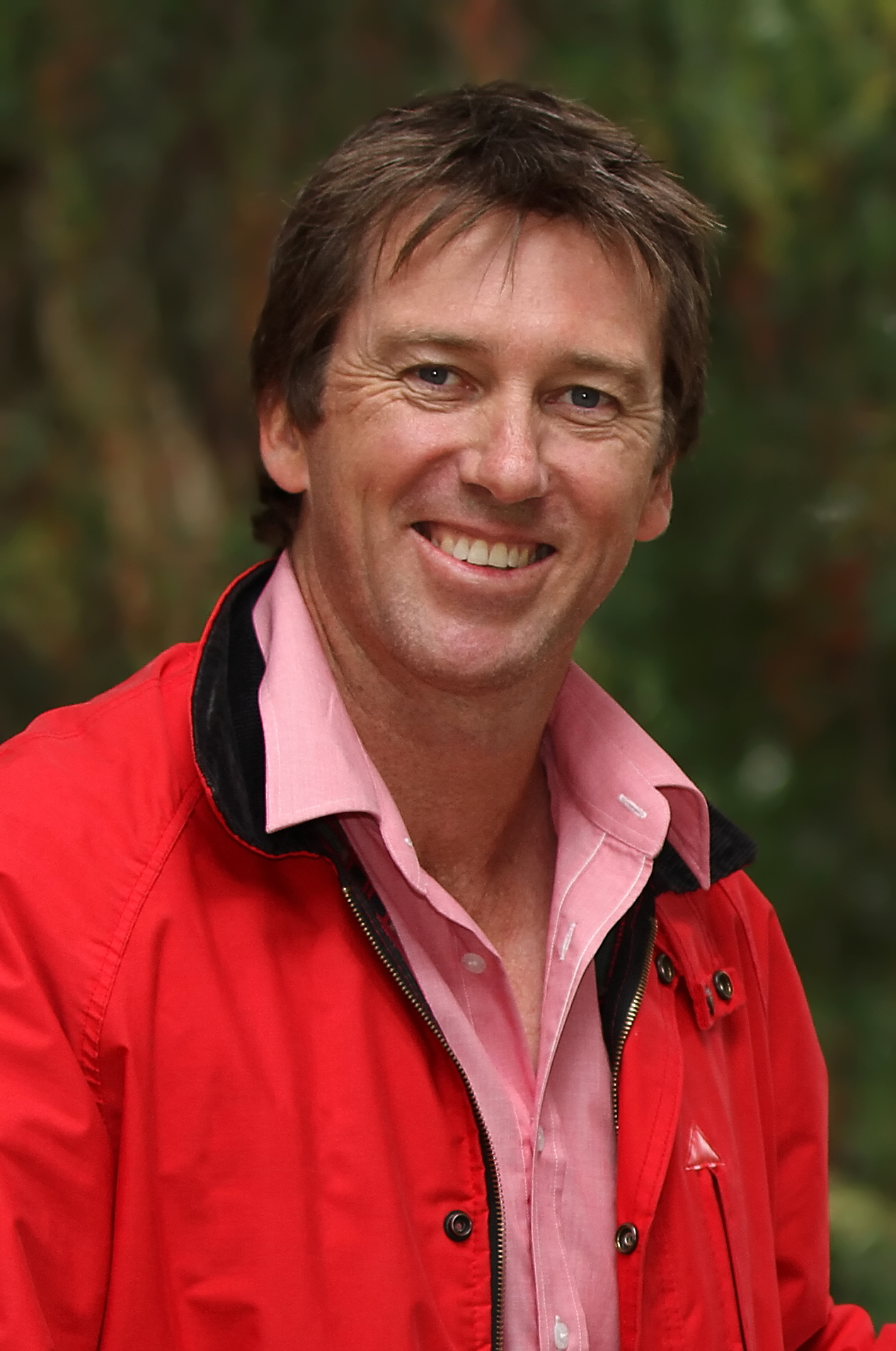
- McGrath in the Queen's Baton Relay in Sydney, 3 March 2018

Personal information
- Full name: Glenn Donald McGrath
- Born: 9 February 1970 (age 56); Dubbo, New South Wales, Australia
- Nickname: Pigeon
- Height: 197 cm (6 ft 6 in)
- Batting: Right-handed
- Bowling: Right arm fast-medium
- Role: Bowler

International information
- National side: Australia (1993–2007)
- Test debut (cap 358): 12 November 1993 v New Zealand
- Last Test: 2 January 2007 v England
- ODI debut (cap 113): 9 December 1993 v South Africa
- Last ODI: 28 April 2007 v Sri Lanka
- ODI shirt no.: 11
- T20I debut (cap 9): 17 February 2005 v New Zealand
- Last T20I: 13 June 2005 v England

Domestic team information
- Years: Team
- 1992/93–2007/08: New South Wales (squad no. 11)
- 2000: Worcestershire
- 2004: Middlesex
- 2008–2009: Delhi Daredevils

Career statistics
Competition	Test	ODI	FC	LA
Matches	124	250	189	305
Runs scored	641	115	977	124
Batting average	7.36	3.83	7.75	3.35
100s/50s	0/1	0/0	0/2	0/0
Top score	61	11	61	11
Balls bowled	29,248	12,970	41,759	15,808
Wickets	563	381	835	465
Bowling average	21.64	22.02	20.85	21.60
5 wickets in innings	29	7	42	7
10 wickets in match	3	0	7	0
Best bowling	8/24	7/15	8/24	7/15
Catches/stumpings	38/–	37/–	54/–	48/–
Medal record
Men's Cricket
Representing Australia
ICC Cricket World Cup
Winner	1999 England-Wales -Ireland-Scotland-Netherlands
Winner	2003 South Africa-Zimbabwe-Kenya
Winner	2007 West Indies
Runner-up	1996 India-Pakistan-Sri Lanka
ICC Champions Trophy
Winner	2006 India
- Source: ESPNcricinfo, 2 August 2017

Glenn Donald McGrath AO (/məˈɡrɑː/; born 9 February 1970) is an Australian former international cricketer whose career spanned 14 years. He was a fast-medium pace bowler and is considered one of cricket's greatest bowlers and a leading contributor to Australia's domination of world cricket from the mid-1990s to the late 2000s. McGrath was a member of the Australian team that won three consecutive World Cup trophies, winning the 1999 Cricket World Cup, the 2003 Cricket World Cup, and the 2007 Cricket World Cup. In the 2003 final, he took the winning wicket of Zaheer Khan. McGrath was also a member of the team that won the 2006 ICC Champions Trophy.

Known throughout his career for maintaining an accurate line and length, McGrath displayed a consistency that enabled him to be one of the most economical and successful fast bowlers of his time. In terms of total career Test wickets taken by fast bowlers, McGrath is the third-most successful of all fast bowlers, behind James Anderson and Stuart Broad. On the list of all Test bowlers, he is seventh, and no bowler has taken more wickets at a lower average. He has also taken the seventh-highest number of one day international wickets (381) and holds the record for most wickets (71) in the Cricket World Cup. McGrath announced his retirement from Test cricket on 23 December 2006, with his Test career coming to an end after the fifth Ashes Test in Sydney in January 2007, while the 2007 World Cup, which marked the end of his one-day career, saw him win the man-of-the-tournament award for his outstanding bowling, which was instrumental in Australia winning the tournament.

McGrath later played for the Indian Premier League team of the Delhi DareDevils and was one of the competition's most economical bowlers during its first season.

McGrath is the director of MRF Pace Foundation, Chennai, replacing Dennis Lillee, who served for 25 years. He currently serves as president of the McGrath Foundation, a breast cancer support and education charity he founded with his late first wife, Jane.

McGrath was honoured during the seventh annual Bradman Awards in Sydney on 1 November 2012. He was inducted into the ICC Cricket Hall of Fame in January 2013.

== Career ==
=== Early years ===
McGrath was born in Dubbo to Beverly and Kevin McGrath. He grew up in Narromine, New South Wales (NSW), where he first played cricket, and his potential was spotted by Doug Walters. He moved to Sydney to play grade cricket for Sutherland and made his debut for NSW during the 1992–93 season. McGrath capped his rapid rise in the next Australian summer with selection in the Test team after only eight first-class matches.

McGrath's Test debut was against New Zealand at Perth in 1993–1994. In Australia's 1995 Test series victory McGrath took the approach of bouncing the West Indies team, including the bowlers, which had not happened before. In McGrath's biography, Ricky Ponting is quoted as saying:

I remember thinking Glenn's decision to take on the West Indies bowlers sent out a positive message to the West Indies that the Australian team was really up for it. Ambrose, Walsh, Kenny Benjamin had never been treated like that before. It made the West Indies sit back and think, 'This Australian team is fair dinkum—they're really up for it.' Even if you aren't the murder boys of cricket, you can show little things to let the opposition know you are serious. It might be the way you warm up, how you dress to go to the ground. Perception can be enormous. If you can give off the right signals to (a) bluffing them or (b) showing them what you're all about. McGrath, at that stage of his career, showed them what he was all about. His body language and the way he looked at their batsman—the wry smile—it sent a signal to the batsman and his own team-mates that he knew what he was doing.

=== County cricket in England ===
McGrath played for Worcestershire in the 2000 English County Championship, proving both successful on the field and popular with the county's supporters. In 14 first-class games he took 80 wickets at 13.21, including an outstanding innings return of 8–41 against Northamptonshire, as well as making his first-ever first-class half-century (55 against Nottinghamshire). He also played a few games for Middlesex in 2004; although accurate, he could manage only nine wickets in four first-class appearances for the county.

=== Against England (Ashes 2005 and 2006/07) ===
During the first Test at Lord's in the 2005 Ashes series McGrath became the fourth bowler in history to take 500 Test wickets with the dismissal of Marcus Trescothick. This wicket was also the start of a productive spell of 5–2 that led to England being bowled out for 155. McGrath took 4–29 in the second innings and was named man of the match in a comprehensive Australian victory.

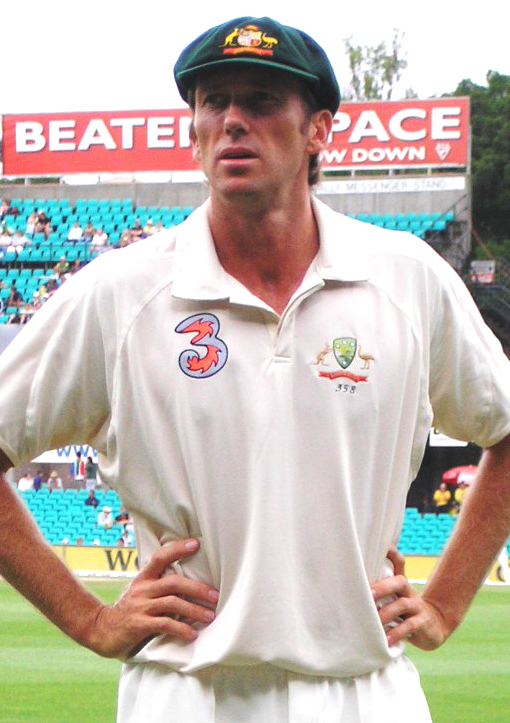
McGrath at a Test match at the SCG in 2007

McGrath trod on a cricket ball and injured his ankle the morning before the start of the second Test at Edgbaston and was unable to play in the match, in which England amassed 407 runs in one day against the McGrath-less bowling attack to win by two runs. He was rushed back when not fully fit for the third Test at Old Trafford, where he earned another five-wicket haul in the second innings of a drawn game, batting in a last-wicket partnership with Brett Lee in the last hour of the Test to deny an English victory. He then missed the fourth Test at Trent Bridge, which England won by three wickets, with an elbow injury. McGrath returned for the final Test at The Oval but he and the rest of the Australian team were unable to force a result and the match was drawn, giving England the series win. McGrath's injury problems are seen as a key factor in England regaining the Ashes, as their victories came in matches in which he was absent.

Australia hosted England in the 2006–07 Ashes series and regained the Ashes, beating England 5–0, only the second 5–0 series whitewash in Ashes history (the first time was by the Australian team during the 1920–1921 Ashes Series, and the later 2013–14 Ashes series). Having taken a break from cricket since April 2006, McGrath used the 2006 ICC Champions Trophy to reclaim his spot in Australia's Test XI. He took a six-wicket haul in his comeback innings in the first Test at the Gabba to set the tone for the rest of the series, with Australia winning back the Ashes in a record-breaking 15 days of play. McGrath took 21 wickets in the series at an average of 23.90, and scored 10 runs and took a catch in what would be his final Test series.

In his biography McGrath wrote:

There was an incredible sense of emotion and elation as I walked around the Sydney Cricket Ground with my team-mates, holding hands with my children, James and Holly. I didn't feel the slightest sense of sadness about retiring. I knew I'd reached the end; my body told me that. And even more importantly, I'd realised that those special moments I was missing in the life and times of my family were too great ... the moments had become weeks at a time, and I didn't like it.

=== Retirement ===
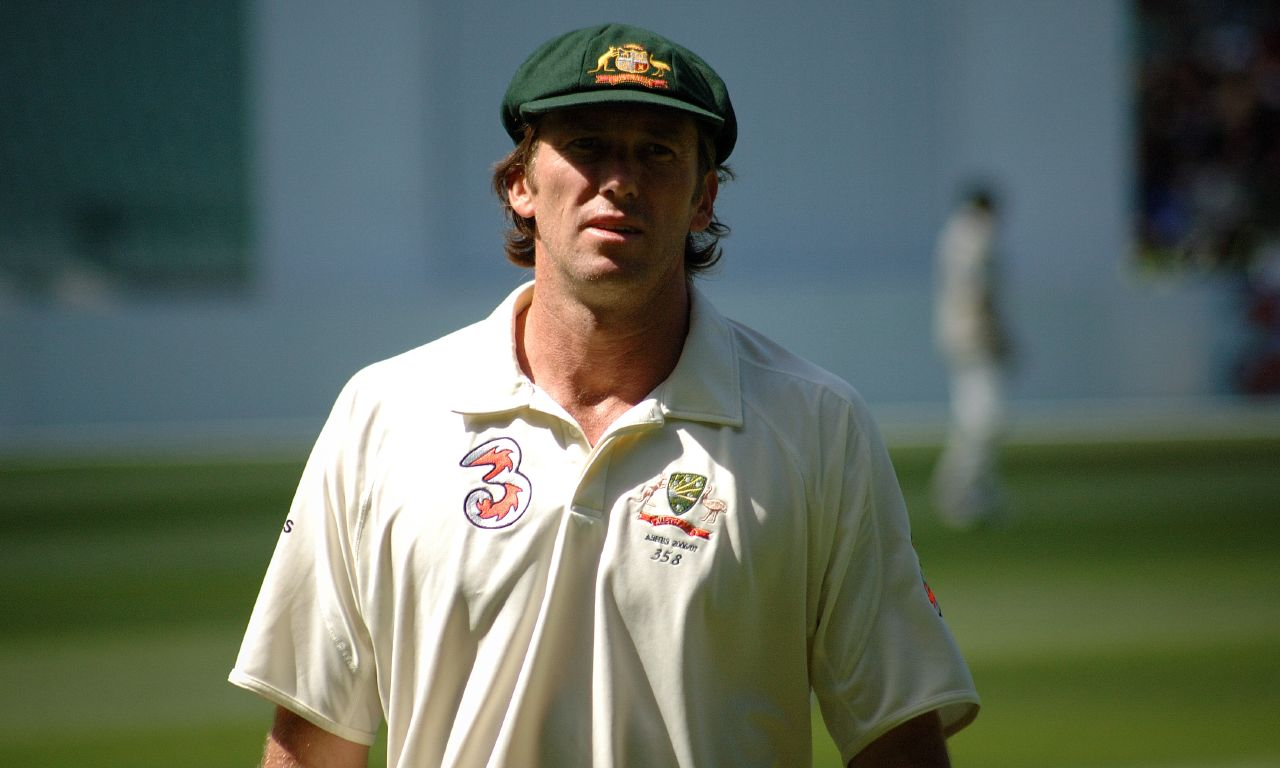
McGrath in his final test series – the 2006–07 Ashes series

On 23 December 2006, McGrath announced his retirement from Tests. His last Test was the fifth Ashes Test against England in Sydney in January 2007, where he took a wicket with the last ball of his Test career. He retired from all forms of international cricket following the successful 2007 Cricket World Cup, at which he became the leading wicket taker in the history of the World Cup, while also being the tournament's top wicket taker with 26 and being named player of the tournament. He was also named in the 'Team of the Tournament' by ESPNcricinfo for the 2007 World Cup. His spell of 3–18 against South Africa was named as the fifth-best ODI bowling performance of the year by ESPNcricinfo voters.

=== Indian Premier League ===
McGrath was signed by the Delhi DareDevils for the 2008 Indian Premier League, the first season of the Indian Premier League. He played in 14 matches for the team and was the team's most economic bowler during the competition. He was re-signed for the 2009 competition but did not play a match. After playing twice for Delhi in the 2009 Champions League Twenty20, in January 2010 the franchise announced that it had bought out the remaining year of McGrath's contract, effectively bringing his cricketing career to an end.

== Playing style ==
=== Bowling ===
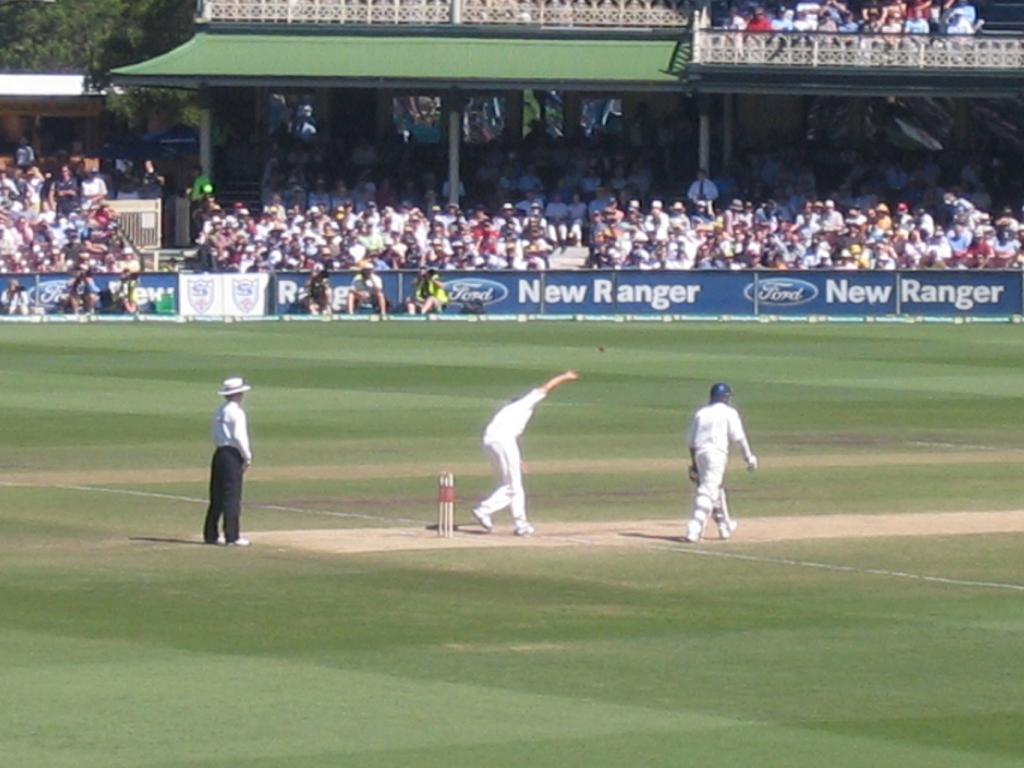
McGrath bowling a wicket-taking ball to Kevin Pietersen at the SCG in 2007

McGrath's bowling was not of express pace. Rather, he relied on unerring accuracy and subtle seam movement, which he derived from his high wrist action and lengthy follow-through. His height (195 cm), combined with a high arm action, allowed him to extract extra bounce, which often surprised batsmen. In the later years of his career he developed as a swing bowler.

His uncomplicated method and natural physical fitness were significant factors in the longevity of McGrath's career. In 2004, he became the first Australian fast bowler to play 100 Tests. In the first innings of the ICC Super Series Test match in 2005, McGrath passed Courtney Walsh to become the greatest wicket-taker among fast bowlers in Test history.

A graph showing McGrath's test career bowling statistics and how they have varied over time

McGrath was regarded as one of the best fast bowlers in the world and has had success against every opposition team, in both Test and one-day cricket. He deliberately (and publicly) targeted the opposition's best batsmen prior to a series in an attempt to distract them, a ploy that regularly worked. At the beginning of the Frank Worrell series against the West Indies he stated in interviews before the match that he would dismiss Sherwin Campbell for his 299th wicket, then remove star batsman Brian Lara for his 300th wicket the very next ball. This happened as planned, and he followed this with the dismissal of captain Jimmy Adams to complete a memorable hat-trick. The targeting of opposition batsmen was generally successful; he dismissed Mike Atherton of England 19 times—the most times any batsman has been dismissed by one bowler in cricket history. On the other hand, he targeted Michael Vaughan prior to the 2002/03 Ashes series in Australia, with Vaughan going on to score three centuries at an average greater than 60. He targeted Andrew Strauss in the 2005 series in England, who went on to score two centuries.

He also tended to engage in sledging of opposition batsmen and teams, though it did not always pay off. Before the 2005 Ashes series he predicted a 5–0 whitewash for Australia, and even said that if England won the Ashes he would return to Australia by boat, but England prevailed 2–1. However, this did not dissuade him from making a similar 5–0 prediction for the next Ashes series, in Australia in 2006/07, which turned out to be true. He finished his career as the most successful Test fast bowler and third-highest Test wicket taker.

McGrath established the tradition of a bowler raising the ball to the crowd at the completion of a five-wicket haul in 2001.

=== Fielding ===
Glenn McGrath's Test career batting performance

McGrath was a competent outfielder with a strong and accurate throwing arm; while not known for his athleticism, he took an exceptional outfield catch on one memorable occasion in 2002 at the Adelaide Oval against England, dismissing English batsman Michael Vaughan from the bowling of Shane Warne, running many metres before leaping into the air and catching the ball with arms outstretched and body horizontal. His captain, Steve Waugh, described the famous catch as "a miracle" and "one of the great catches in history".

=== Batting ===
Mark Taylor: Average of 6.5 from McGrath and that has grown throughout his career. It was sub 2 at one stage.

Ian Healy: Langer [is] very bored reading a book, Gilchrist getting ready to keep. The rest [have] not much faith in McGrath and Gillespie and their partnership.

— Mark Taylor and Ian Healy commentary in the opening stages of McGrath's career-best 61 run innings.

McGrath's batting prowess, in the early phases of his career, was poor; in fact, he scored first-ball ducks (zero runs) on both his Test and One-Day International debuts, and his batting average hovered below 4 for the first few years of his career. Years of patient tutelage from captain and friend Steve Waugh improved this aspect of his game to the point where he scored a Test half-century, which came on 20 November 2004 at the Gabba. His final score in that innings was 61, sharing a last wicket stand of 114 with Jason Gillespie (54*) to hilarity and the acclaim of their team-mates. Nevertheless, McGrath was, for the duration of his career, regarded as a batting 'bunny', although he pushed his average above 7.00 runs/dismissal by the end of his career. In the first World Cricket Tsunami Appeal charity match, he was promoted to bat at number 6 ahead of specialist batsmen Stephen Fleming and Matthew Hayden, but was dismissed first ball trying to slog Muttiah Muralitharan. Towards the end of his international career McGrath, while not scoring many runs himself, became rather more difficult for opposing bowlers to dismiss, being dismissed only once during the 2005 Ashes series. With a contribution of 11 runs in the first innings of the MCG 2005 Boxing Day Test versus South Africa, he stood his ground for 53 deliveries, helping Michael Hussey push the Australian tail to a record tenth-wicket stand against South Africa of 107 runs.

== Career best performances ==
	Bowling (innings)			
	Figures	Fixture	Venue	Season
Test	8/24	v Pakistan	WACA, Perth	2004
ODI	7/15	v Namibia	North West Cricket Stadium, Potchefstroom	2003
T20I	3/31	v England	Rose Bowl, Southampton	2005
FC	8/24	v Pakistan	WACA, Perth	2004
LA	7/15	v Namibia	North West Cricket Stadium, Potchefstroom	2003
T20	4/29	v Royal Challengers Bangalore	Feroz Shah Kotla, Delhi	2008

== Personal life ==
Glenn's first wife, Jane Louise (née Steele), was born in the United Kingdom and had worked as a flight attendant before their marriage. Glenn and Jane met at a Hong Kong nightclub called "Joe Bananas" in 1995, and married in 1999. They had two children. Jane McGrath fought recurrent battles with metastatic breast cancer, having been first diagnosed in 1997. On 26 January 2008 (Australia Day) Glenn and Jane McGrath were both made Members of the Order of Australia. Jane McGrath died, aged 42, on 22 June 2008 from complications following cancer surgery.

Glenn McGrath met Sara Leonardi, an interior designer, during the 2009 Indian Premier League. They married at home in Cronulla on 18 November 2010. In April 2011 McGrath put his home on the market for $6 million. Their daughter was born in 2015.

In 2015, McGrath received widespread criticism when it was revealed he had killed a variety of animals during a hunting safari in South Africa. McGrath told Australian Shooter magazine that "I'm keen to get into trophy hunting, no animal in particular, but a big safari in Africa would be great." Photographs of McGrath subsequently appeared on the website of Chipitani Safaris, a game park, showing him crouched beside what looked to be a dead buffalo, two hyenas and the tusks of an elephant. He subsequently expressed his regret.

McGrath is a supporter of the Cronulla-Sutherland Sharks in the NRL

== McGrath Foundation ==
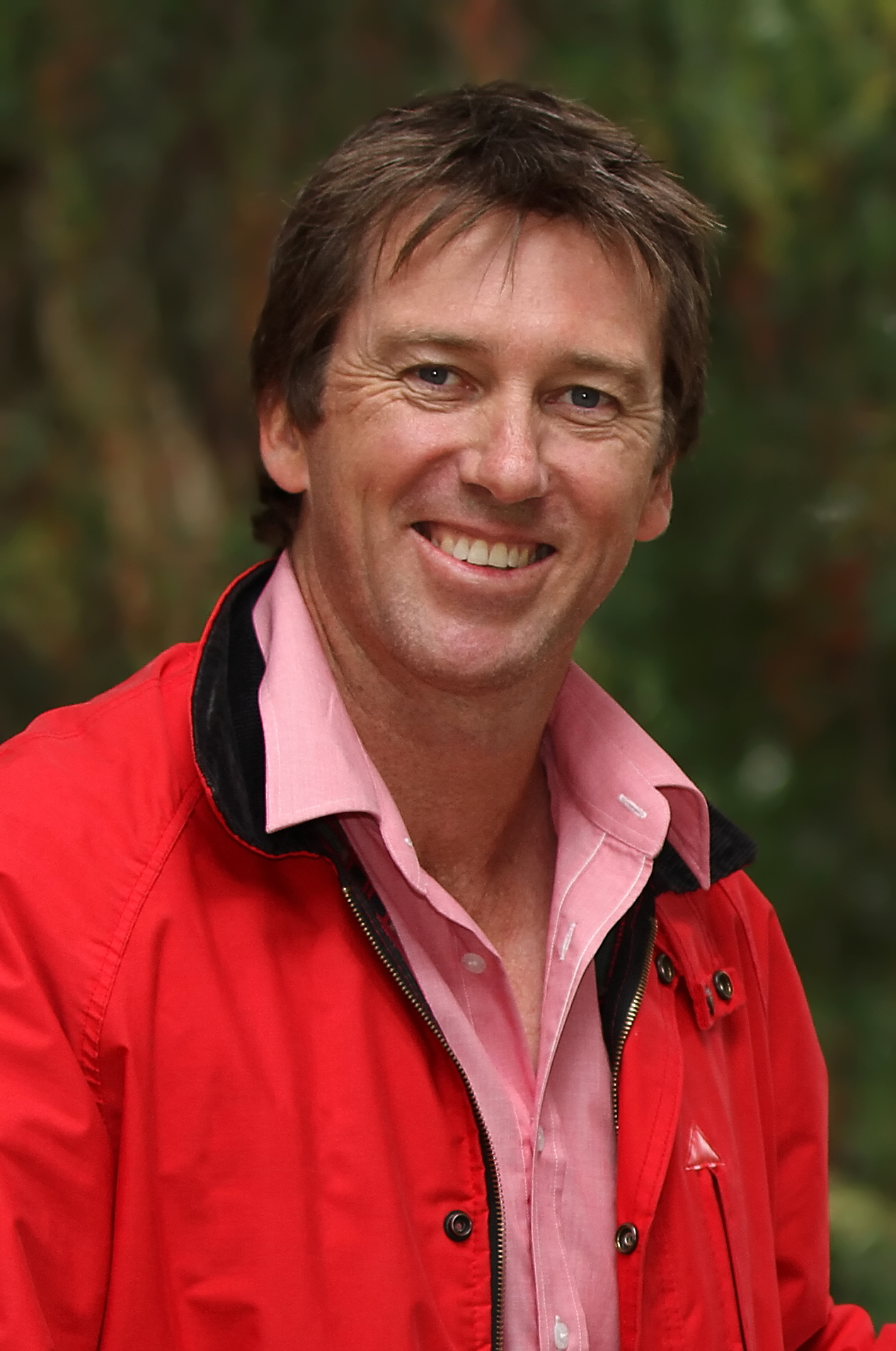
McGrath in 2011, wearing the pink of the McGrath Foundation

In 2002 Glenn and Jane founded the McGrath Foundation, a breast cancer support and education charity in Australia, which raises money to fund McGrath Breast Care Nurses in communities right across Australia and increase breast cancer awareness in young women. Since 2007, the third day of the first Test held in Sydney Cricket Ground is named Jane McGrath Day, even if the day is washed out. Following the death of Jane in June 2008, Glenn accepted the voluntary role of chairman of the Board of the McGrath Foundation, and he participates in many activities in support of the Foundation to ensure the fulfilment of its vision. As of April 2016, the McGrath Foundation has placed 110 McGrath Breast Care Nurses around Australia, who have helped support more than 33,000 Australian families.

On 29 December 2018, Ruth Strauss died after a battle with a rare form of lung cancer. In the wake of Ruth's death, former Ashes adversary Andrew Strauss reached out to McGrath who later helped Strauss to found the Ruth Strauss Foundation and secured Day 2 of the Lord's Test as a similar partner event ahead of the 2019 Ashes.

== Honours ==
In 2001, McGrath was one of just twenty-one Australian athletes inducted into the Australian Institute of Sport Best of the Best list.

He was awarded the Allan Border Medal and the Men's Test Player of the Year by CA in 2000. He was also awarded the Men's ODI Player of the Year in 2001.

McGrath was named a Member of the Order of Australia on 26 January (Australia Day) in 2008 for "service to cricket as a player", and along with his wife for "service to the community through the establishment of the McGrath Foundation." In 2008 McGrath was named the NSW Australian of the Year.

McGrath was inducted into the Sport Australia Hall of Fame in 2011, and the ICC Cricket Hall of Fame in January 2013. He was also inducted into the Australian Cricket Hall of Fame in 2013.

He was named as a bowler in Australia's "greatest-ever ODI team". In a fan poll conducted by the CA in 2017, he was named in the country's best Ashes XI in the last 40 years.

A statue of McGrath by artist Brett "Mon" Garling was installed at McGrath's home town of Narromine in 2009.

McGrath was promoted to Officer of the Order of Australia in the 2024 King's Birthday Honours List.

== Records ==
McGrath was twice involved in tenth wicket partnerships which added 100 runs or more, a record matched only by New Zealand batsman Nathan Astle.

At the time of his retirement, McGrath's 7 for 15 against Namibia were the best bowling figures in a World Cup match, and the second best in all ODIs. He also held the record for the most wickets in an edition of the World Cup (26 in 2007) until this was broken by Mitchell Starc in 2019.

After his dismissal for a duck in the fourth test of the 2006–2007 Ashes series, McGrath claimed the record of having scored more ducks in Test cricket than any other Australian cricketer (35 – one more than Shane Warne).

McGrath held the record for dismissing the most batsmen for ducks in Test cricket (104), until it was surpassed by James Anderson in 2021.

== Bibliography ==
- McGrath, Glenn; Lane, Daniel (2008). Glenn McGrath: Line and Strength – The Complete Story. Random House. ISBN 978-1-74166-719-6. : the book includes a postscript by McGrath's late wife Jane.

Preceded by Sachin Tendulkar	World Cup Player of the Series winner 2007	Succeeded by Yuvraj Singh
