= Parish of Hervey =

Hervey, New South Wales is a civil parish Narromine County west of Peak Hill, New South Wales. The Parish of Hervey is in Parkes Shire located at 32°42′54″S 148°17′04″E.

The only settlement in the parish is Trewilga, New South Wales, and the economy is based in broad acre agriculture. The traditional owners of the area were the Wiradjuri people.
