= Parish of Backwater =

Backwater is a civil parish of Narromine County, New South Wales.

Backwater is on Back Water Creek, west of Narromine, New South Wales and is located at 32°13′54″S 148°08′04″E.

The economy is mainly based on broad acre agricultureincluding sheep, cattle and wheat.
