= Adam Phillips (animator) =

Australian filmmaker and animator

- Born: 29 January 1971 (age 55); Narromine, New South Wales, Australia
- Other name: Chluaid
- Occupations: Animator, filmmaker, game designer, freelancer
- Years active: 1993–present
- Known for: Brackenwood
- Style: Fantasy
- Website: bitey.com

Adam Phillips, also known by his online alias Chluaid (/klaɪd/), is an Australian filmmaker, animator, and former freelancer. He is best known for his animation work, consisting of flash animation compositions published on his website, Bitey Castle, and on the flash portal Newgrounds. His animation work on the latter has over 16 million views, making him one of the most-viewed artists on the site. Phillips created the fantasy animation shorts series, Brackenwood, the first of which was posted on Newgrounds in March 2004.

== Life and career ==
Adam Phillips was born in 1971 and raised in Narromine, New South Wales.

In 1989, Phillips moved to Queensland and was injured in an industrial accident. He dedicated himself to drawing during his convalescence. In 1993, he was hired by Disney to work as a tweener in Sydney and promoted to the position of character animator two years later. He became the effects director in 1998, a role in which he worked on several Disney sequel films. At the end of 2004, Phillips left Disney "to pursue [his] own interests."

Since that time, Phillips has produced more content for his Brackenwood setting, including Prowlies at the River, which in 2006 was said to be in the Top 10 Most Influential Online Flash Shorts.

He has continued to do outside work as a freelance animator, writer and special effects designer for clients such as Kellogg's, BioWare San Francisco and Wizards of the Coast (Dungeons and Dragons).

In 2006, Phillips produced thirty 10–20 second animations in 30 days.

In December 2016, he was a featured artist at the Adobe Design Center.

Phillips was a frequent collaborator with Electronic Arts' BioWare San Francisco studio (formerly EA2D), working as a freelance animator with the studio on three Dragon Age-branded games. His collaboration included creating all of the art and animation for the browser-based Dragon Age Journeys. He set the art style for the Facebook/Google+ game, Dragon Age Legends, as well as animating the opening cinematic and providing concept art for the game's main characters. His art was also used for Dragon Age Legends: Remix 01, a collaboration between BioWare San Francisco and the Flash game developer PixelAnte (also known as Evan Miller).

In 2013, Phillips created an animated GIF of association football coach Miguel Herrera, which went viral, being viewed over seven million times.

Phillips switched from Adobe Flash to Toon Boom Animation's software. In 2014, Toon Boom commissioned Phillips to write a guide book titled Animate to Harmony: The Independent Animator's Guide to Toon Boom, and in 2016 Phillips' tutorials on their Harmony software were broadcast on Twitch TV.

Phillips has worked on the American animated comedy television series Bob's Burgers as a digital effects animator (2014), storyboard artist (2015–2016), and assistant director (2016–2019).

In 2017, Phillips announced that he would return to work on Brackenwood animations, with the Wildlife Documentary Series and a conventional installment in the form for a sequel to The Last of the Dashkin.

In 2011, Phillips launched the BiteyCastle Effects Academy (BCA FX), a subscription-based series of video tutorials teaching how to do 2D animated visual effects.

In 2019, Phillips was quoted in a Wired article where he talked about why he decided to switch to digital and use Flash.

=== Dashkin ===
In 2008, Phillips released the latest conventional Brackenwood installment, The Last of the Dashkin, with the intention to either start work on a sequel or to pitch the series as a feature film. However, in 2010 Phillips partnered with programmer and fellow animator Sean McGee to start work on a Brackenwood-branded video game titled Dashkin, which would serve as a sequel to The Last of the Dashkin. It would be a high-speed side-scroller, all made in Adobe Flash. While still working as a freelance animator for EA2D in 2011, Phillips showed their progress on the Dashkin game to his colleagues at the studio. Not long after, EA2D was renamed Bioware San Francisco and had begun to search for established 2D IPs on Flash game sites, such as Newgrounds. EA2D asked Phillips if he would be interested for them to work with him on making Dashkin a social game on Facebook, and after discussing it with McGee, he agreed. While initially worried about the game having microtransactions, Phillips reasoned that it could help Brackenwood reach a larger audience. A small team came together, file sharing and version control were put in place, but as Phillips and McGee got to the contract stage, EA2D began to go through some big changes and their boss advised them to take the Dashkin IP back. Not long after, their boss left the company to co-found Rumble Games, and most of the EA2D Phillips had been a part of disbanded after a few months. Phillips and McGee had already begun overhauling Dashkin into a social game, but they had no money left and only about 5% of the game completed. After shopping the IP around to some Flash portals and getting rejected, Phillips and McGee launched a Kickstarter fundraiser to fund the project. They received US$27,333 in donations towards making the game. After five years of working together, the two collaborators' schedules would not allow them to continue. Phillips had also found that the limitations of Adobe Flash were hindering the performance of the game considerably, and so the project was cancelled in 2015.

In March 2017, Phillips announced the full-time development of a new Brackenwood branded game called Dashkin, a revival of the previous Dashkin game project he had been working on with McGee. According to the Dashkin dev blog, it was to be a speed-based side-scrolling platformer built with Unreal Engine 4, and was going to be split into three parts, one of which was to be a story mode that would serve as a direct sequel to Phillips' latest conventional Brackenwood movie, The Last of the Dashkin. He had partnered with Kirk Sexton of Wrong Dojo Inc., who he had met at EA2D when Sexton was working there as a server engineer. Sexton had previous experience with programming for video games, so his role became that of a programmer on the project, while Phillips would be responsible for the majority of the art assets and the story. The project was a feature in a large article by Toon Boom, the company developing Toon Boom Harmony, which is the 2D animation software Phillips uses and an industry standard. The project was canceled in October 2018 due to the deterioration of the working relationship of the team. Since then, Phillips has returned to work on the sequel to The Last of the Dashkin, with the working title of The Last of the Dashkin 2. He intends to use it as a pitch for a Brackenwood feature film or a series on a streaming service.

== Selected works ==
=== Books ===
- Flash MX Most Wanted: Effects & Movies (2002) – Author of chapter "Animation: hitchHiker". ISBN 1903450942
- New Masters of Flash: Volume 3 (2004) – Author of chapter on lighting effects and their implementation in Flash. ISBN 1590593146
- Bitey Castle Academy: Flash CS3 Animation (2009) – ebook teaching Flash for graphics and frame-by-frame animation.
- Animate to Harmony: The Independent Animator's Guide To Toon Boom (2014) - Guide to using Toon Boom's Animate and Harmony software. ISBN 1138428345
