= Parish of Gilmour =

Gilmour, New South Wales is a civil parish of Narromine County located at 32°33′54″S 148°05′04″E on the Bogan River.

== History ==
The traditional owners of the district were Wiradjuri people.

Gold was discovered at the Tomingley Gold Fields in the west of the parish during the 19th century, however today the economy of Gilmour Parish is mainly based on broad acre agricultureincluding sheep, cattle and wheat.
