= Hawkridge Venture =

British two-seat glider, 1947

Venture
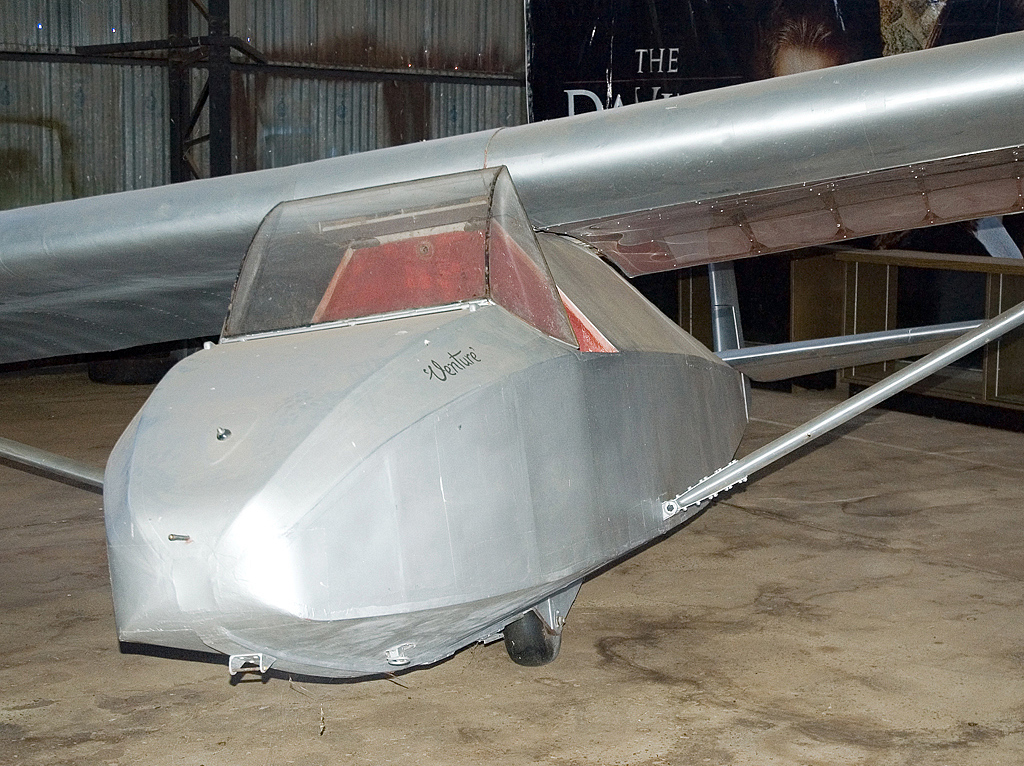
- Hawkridge Venture

General information
- Type: Side by side seat sailplane
- National origin: United Kingdom
- Manufacturer: Hawkridge Aircraft Ltd, Dunstable
- Number built: 2

History
- First flight: c.1947

The Hawkridge Venture was a wooden sailplane built shortly after World War II in the UK. It carried two people, in side-by-side configuration. Two Ventures were built, one flying in the UK and the other in Australia.

== Design and development ==
Hawkridge Aircraft Ltd was founded in 1945 by Eric Paul Zander (formerly of Dart Aircraft) and Harry E Bolton, initially with an office in London and a small workshop at Bolton's home in Denham. They later moved to a small factory in Dunstable, close to the home of the London Gliding Club, with the aim of servicing and building gliders. The Venture was the only aircraft they both designed and built. It was a conventional wooden glider, seating two side by side.

Its wing was built around two spars and had a constant-chord centre section with straight taper outboard. Spoilers were fitted on the upper surfaces; there were no flaps. The wing was mounted on the raised upper fuselage just behind the cockpit, braced by one lift strut on each side from the lower fuselage. The cantilever, straight-tapered tailplane was also mounted on top of the fuselage, far enough forward that the rudder hinge was aligned with the trailing edges of the elevators. The fin was narrow, with a vertical leading edge; the rudder was almost rectangular and extended down to the lower fuselage.

The fuselage of the Venture was flat-sided, with decking behind the wings and a shallow ventral extension from the wings forward. The latter carried a landing skid with a fixed monowheel behind it, under the wing. A tail bumper completed the undercarriage. The open cockpit seated two side by side under the wing leading edge.

The first flight of the Venture is thought to have been made in 1947.

== Operational history ==
The only Venture built by Hawkridge was registered as G-ALMF and then as BGA 688. It ended its career with the Lakes Gliding Club at Tebay where it crashed on 22 July 1962. Another Venture was built in Australia by the Dubbo Gliding Club in 1953 from plans supplied by Hawkridge. This aircraft, registered VH-GDU, was with the Orange Gliding Club of New South Wales in about 1970. In 2010 it was held by the Narromine Aviation Museum, not far from Dubbo.

== Specifications ==
Data from Ellison

General characteristics

- Capacity: 2
- Length: 24 ft 4 in (7.42 m)
- Wingspan: 55 ft 0 in (16.76 m)
