= Wyanga =

- Coordinates: 32°14′02″S 148°14′02″E
- Country: Australia
- State: New South Wales
- Location: 451 km (280 mi) NW of Sydney; 43 km (27 mi) W of Dubbo; 38 km (24 mi) SE of Trangie

Government
  - Federal division: Parkes
- Postcode: 2821

Wyanga, New South Wales is a bounded rural locality in Central, New South Wales. Wyanga is a station on the Parkes–Narromine railway line.

The economy of Wyanga is mainly based on broad acre agriculture including sheep, cattle and wheat.
