= Parish of Mingelo =

Mingelo is a civil parish of Narromine County in central New South Wales located at the confluence of the Ten Mile Creek and the Bogan River.

The only two settlements of the parish are Trewilga (formerly known as Mingelo) and Peak Hill, New South Wales, both were stops on the Parkes–Narromine railway line.

Although gold was discovered in the civil parish during the 19th century the economy is today based in broad acre agriculture, though some mining remains.
