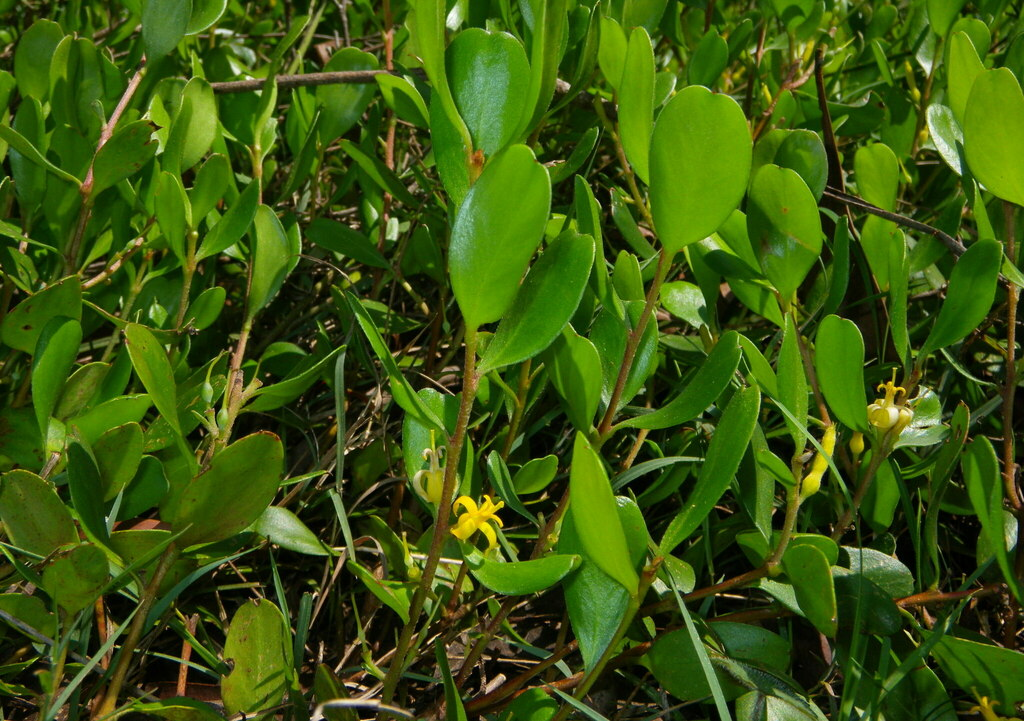

Scientific classification
- Kingdom: Plantae
- Clade: Embryophytes
- Clade: Tracheophytes
- Clade: Spermatophytes
- Clade: Angiosperms
- Clade: Eudicots
- Order: Proteales
- Family: Proteaceae
- Genus: Persoonia
- Species: P. daphnoides

Binomial name
- Persoonia daphnoides A.Cunn. ex R.Br.
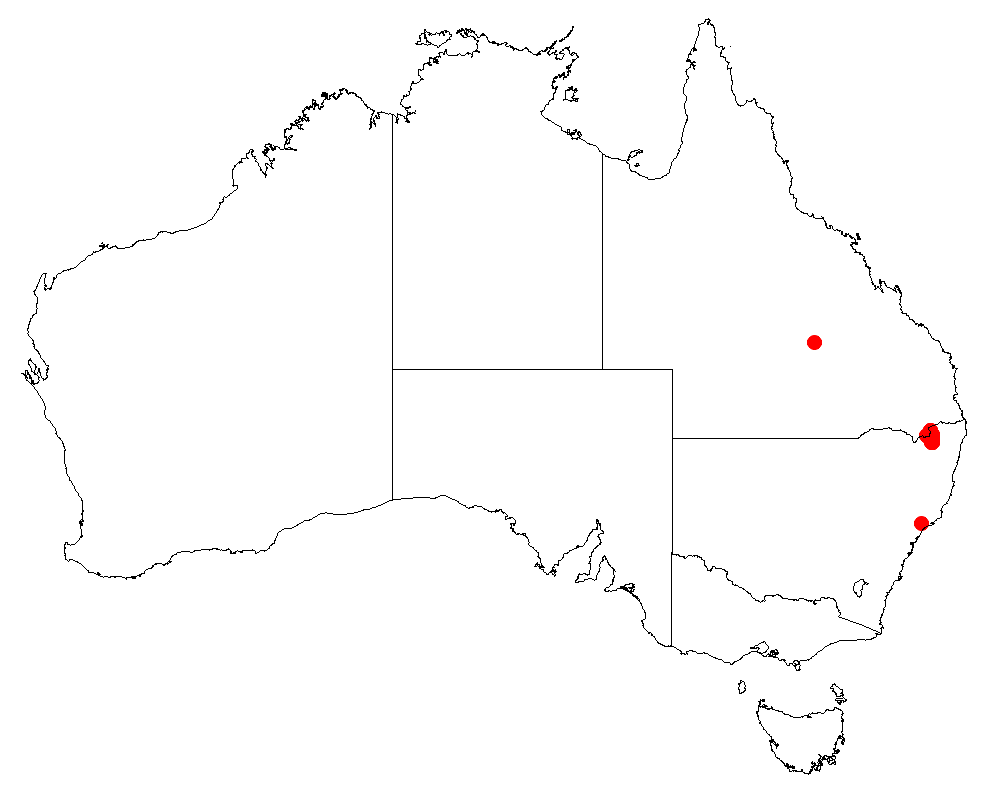
- Occurrence data from Australasian Virtual Herbarium

= Persoonia daphnoides =

Species of flowering plant

Persoonia daphnoides is a plant in the family Proteaceae and is endemic to a restricted area in eastern Australia. It is a prostrate shrub with spatula-shaped to egg-shaped leaves with the narrower end towards the base, and yellow flowers in groups of up to eight on a rachis up to 35 mm (1.4 in) long.

== Description ==
Persoonia daphnoides is a prostrate shrub that typically grows to a height of about 10 cm (3.9 in) and has its young branchlets densely covered with light brown hairs. The leaves are spatula-shaped to egg-shaped with the narrower end towards the base, 15–50 mm (0.59–1.97 in) long, 4–20 mm (0.16–0.79 in) wide and twisted through 90°. The flowers are arranged in groups of up to eight along a rachis up to 35 mm (1.4 in) long that usually grows into a leafy shoot after flowering. Each flower is on an erect pedicel 1.5–3 mm (0.059–0.118 in) long and the tepals are yellow, 9–10 mm (0.35–0.39 in) long and hairy on the outside. Flowering occurs from December to January.

== Taxonomy ==
Persoonia daphnoides was first formally described in 1830 by Robert Brown from an unpublished manuscript by Allan Cunningham. Brown's description was published in Supplementum primum Prodromi florae Novae Hollandiae.

Cunningham gave the type location as "near the Hunter's River" but Peter H. Weston and Lawrie Johnson consider that Cunningham's label is erroneus.

== Distribution and habitat ==
This geebung grows in woodland and forest near Tenterfield in New South Wales and nearby Stanthorpe in Queensland, at altitudes between 950 and 1,200 m (3,120 and 3,940 ft).
