= Tomingley, New South Wales =

Tomingley
- Town
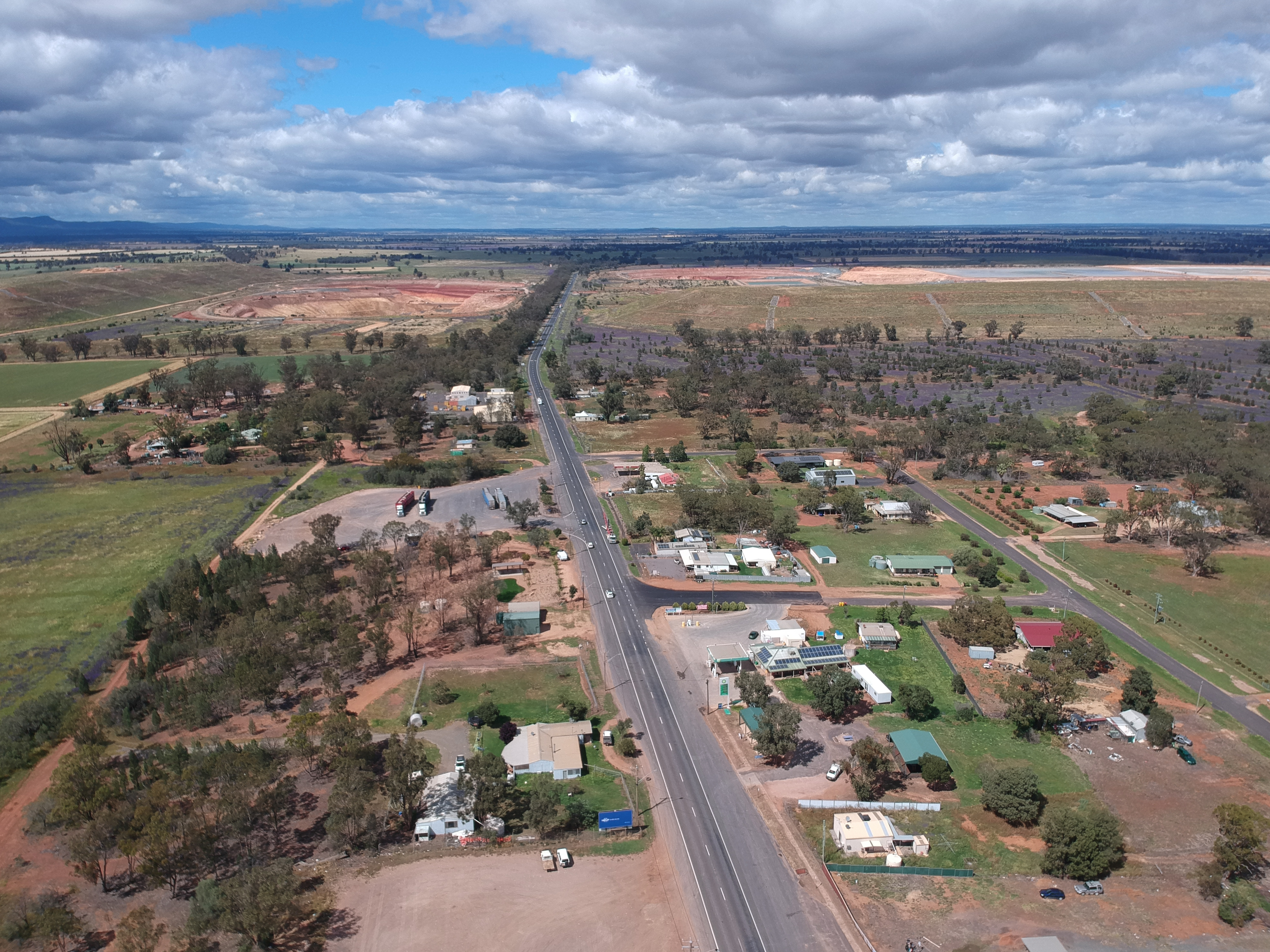
- Town view

- Coordinates: 32°34′0″S 148°14′0″E
- Country: Australia
- State: New South Wales
- LGA: Shire of Narromine
- Location: 425 km (264 mi) W of Sydney; 53 km (33 mi) SW of Dubbo; 38 km (24 mi) S of Narromine

Government
  - State electorate: Dubbo
  - Federal division: Parkes

Population
  - Total: 330 (2011 census)
- Postcode: 2869

Tomingley is a town in the Central West region of New South Wales, Australia. The town is in the Narromine Shire local government area and on the Newell Highway, 425 kilometres (264 mi) west of the state capital, Sydney and 54 kilometres (34 mi) south west of the regional centre of Dubbo. At the 2011 census, Tomingley had a population of 330. Tomingley is famous for gold mining and owes its origin to that. It is also known for the story that after WWII the military disposed of a large quantity of guns and other war materials down the biggest mine in the area.
