= Narromine =

Narromine Ngarrumayin
- Town
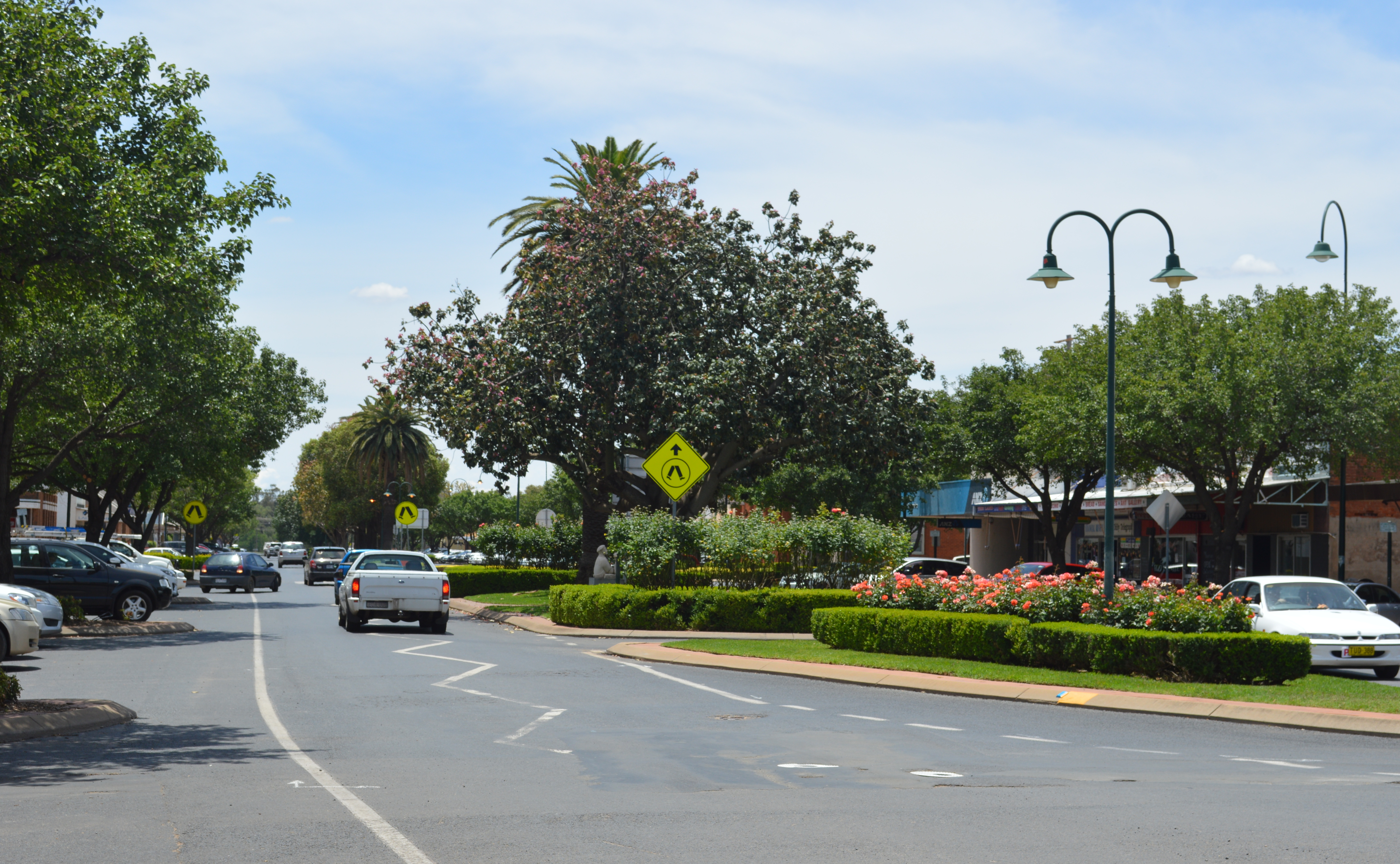
- Dandaloo St (Mitchell Highway), Narromine, 2017

- Coordinates: 32°14′S 148°14′E
- Country: Australia
- State: New South Wales
- LGA: Narromine Shire
- Location: 451 km (280 mi) NW of Sydney; 38 km (24 mi) W of Dubbo; 38 km (24 mi) SE of Trangie
- Established: 1883

Government
  - State electorate: Dubbo
  - Federal division: Parkes
- Elevation: 236 m (774 ft)

Population
  - Total: 3,507 (2021 census)
- Postcode: 2821
- Annual rainfall: 526.8 mm (20.74 in)
- Website: Narromine

Narromine (/næroʊmaɪn/; Wiradjuri: Ngarrumayin) is a rural Australian town located approximately 40 kilometres (25 mi) west of Dubbo in the Orana region of New South Wales. The town is at the centre of Narromine Shire. The 2021 census recorded a population of 3,507. Narromine holds strong historical ties to the Australian Military, as it was the location of RAAF No.19 Inland Aircraft Fuel Depot (IAFD) during World War II. The base contributed to the preparation of troops through a training organisation known as the Empire Air Training Scheme (EATS). The town was one of twelve locations for the No.5 Elementary Flying Training School RAAF in 1940.

The town and its district was formed on traditional Wiradjuri country, one of the largest Indigenous populations in central New South Wales. The Macquarie River passes through the town. The Mitchell Highway, named after the early explorer Sir Thomas Mitchell, is the main road from Dubbo to the West and also passes through Narromine. Prior to settlement in the early 1800s, Wiradjuri tribes occupied much of the land between Wambool/Wambuul (renamed the Macquarie River by late settlers), the Kalar (the Lachlan River) and the Murrumbidgerie (Murrumbidgee River). In December 2021, the NSW government restored its traditional name and formally assigned the name Wambuul to the riverbed of the Macquarie River. The term Wambuul means 'winding river' in Wiradjuri language and both names are recognised with equal status.

Narromine district has a history of flooding, with the largest flood recorded in 1926. Multiple plant and animal species are found within the Narromine district and is home to many iconic Australian species. Situated in the Murray-Darling Basin region, Narromine's agricultural land is used for many dryland and irrigated agricultural activities. Although Narromine is one of the main growing regions for cotton in the Central West district of New South Wales, the production of beans, wheat and grain, as well as livestock products including wool, mutton, lamb and beef are all common. The Burrendong Dam has facilitated irrigation schemes that have greatly aided local agriculture in the town and its surrounding districts. The town's rural history has organically bought tourism to the area, with the Narromine Aviation Museum, Aero Club and Mungery Picnic Races being highlight attractions. Rugby teams are represented by the Narromine Jets and Narromine Gorillas.

== History ==
The town name comes from a pastoral property, which in turn came from the Wiradjuri word 'ngarru-mayiny' meaning 'honey people'. The land lay within Wangaibon territory.

The first European to visit the district was John Oxley who traced the course of the Macquarie River in 1818.

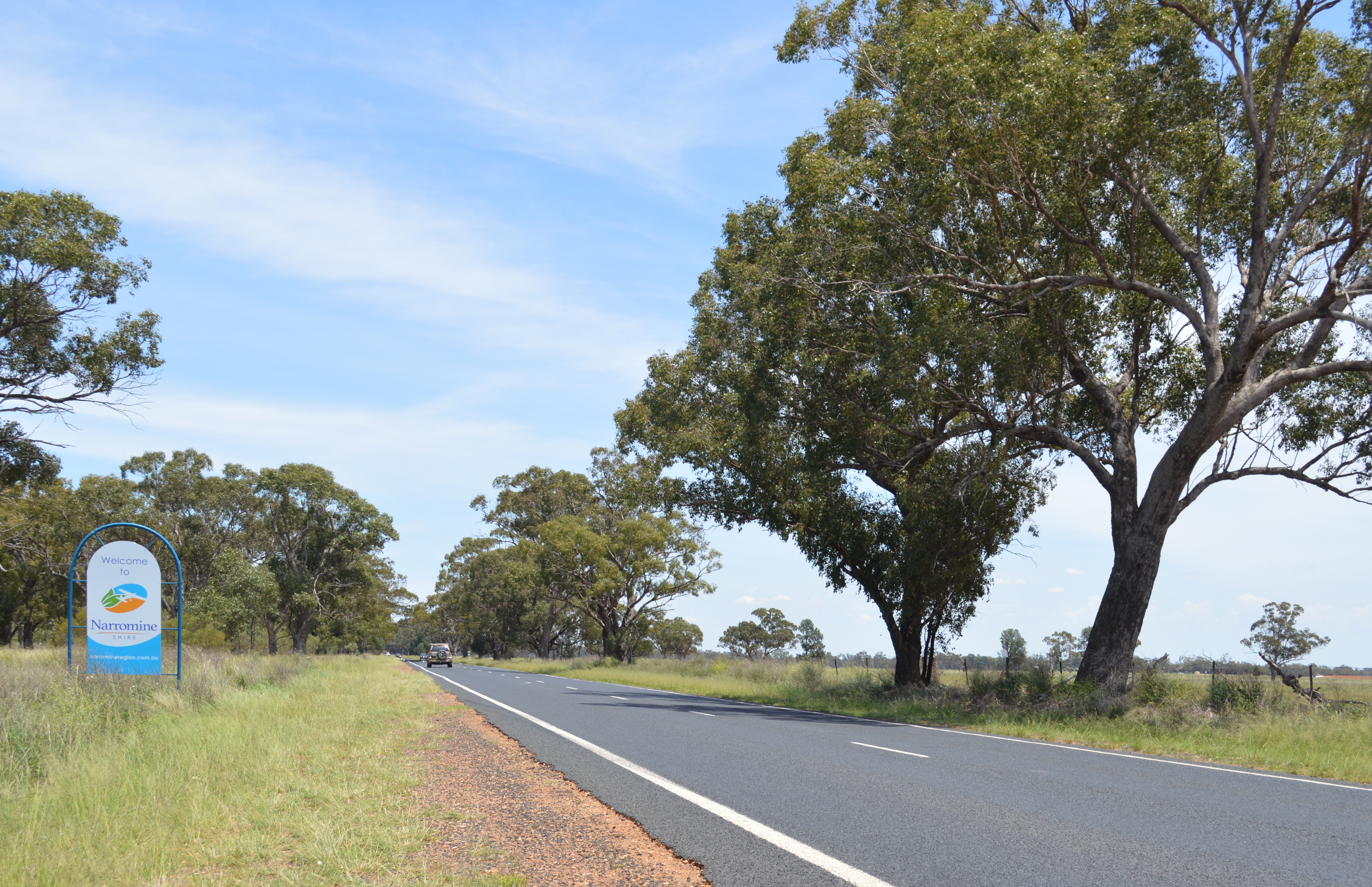
Entrance to Narromine Shire via the Mitchell Highway

The Main West railway line extension between Dubbo and Nevertire, which included Narromine, was officially opened on 20 October 1882. The town was established after the railway opened, the first structures in the town being the railway platforms. The township was gazetted in 1883, and the railway station opened on 1 May 1883. It was renamed to its current spelling in October 1889. Narramine Post Office opened on 20 October 1882 and was renamed Narromine in November 1900. The village of Narramine was proclaimed in July 1883, and numerous buildings followed, including the police station built in 1890, the store (1890) and the Royal Hotel (1890). A bridge over the Macquarie River was built in 1897. After federation, the population of Narromine was 2,228 in the 1911 census, and in 1947 the population was 1,816.

=== Early history and settlement ===
Early history reports that British explorer and surveyor of Australia John Oxley, was the first man to pass by the site of the town of Narromine in June 1818. From a study of the map showing his route, Oxley set out with boats and horses to trace the course of the Macquarie River, that ran directly through the Narromine district during the early 1800s. From 1818 onwards, other notable explorations by Robert Dixon, Major Mitchell and Captain Charles Sturt. In later years, the land became settled and the land became property of the Crown, meaning that is belonged to the monarch. Today, Crown land under Commonwealth territories are separate to the monarch's private estate and is deemed public land to Australia. However, in Narromine during 1844, squatters began to take possession of extensive areas of Crown land that lead to a list of licence holders of property (known as the Government Gazette of 1848). Most notably, William Charles Wentworth was the first landowner of formally named "Narramine".

The following stations were first retained by landowners as a part of the Government Gazette of 1848:

- "Terramungamine" and "Burroway" – E. Brook Cornish
- "Minore" – Benajamin Boyd
- "Graddell" – J. Corse
- "Mungery" – John Dargin
- "Bulgandramine" and "Tomingley" – J. Gilmore
- "Wallanbillan" – Samuel Phillips
- "Timbrebungan" – Robert Smith
- "Euromedah" or "Mount Park", "Weemabah" and "Gunningbar" – Saul Samuel

=== The Court House Hotel ===
Situated on the corner of Burraway Street and Merilba Street, the Court House Hotel was initially established by David Fitch in 1889 and originally opened as Fitch's Court House Hotel.

=== Narromine in literature ===
The town of Narromine is featured in a poem by Banjo Paterson, "The City of Dreadful Thirst", published originally in 1889. The 48-line poem references the town nine times and satirically narrates the culture of the people of Narromine as well as the floods, dusty plains and landscape of the town.

The stranger came from Narromine and made his little joke—
"They say we folks in Narromine are narrow-minded folk.
But all the smartest men down here are puzzled to define
A kind of new phenomenon that came to Narromine ..."

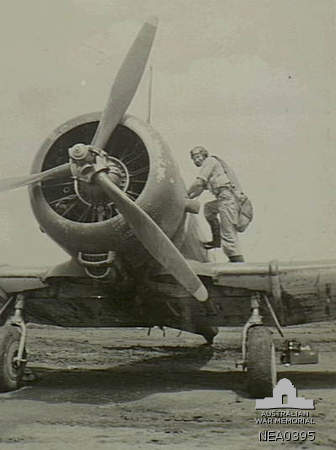
Flying Officer M. A. Hough RAAF of Narromine, NSW, on the wing about to climb into one of No. 5 (Tactical Reconnaissance) Squadron's CAC Wirraway aircraft

=== Military history ===
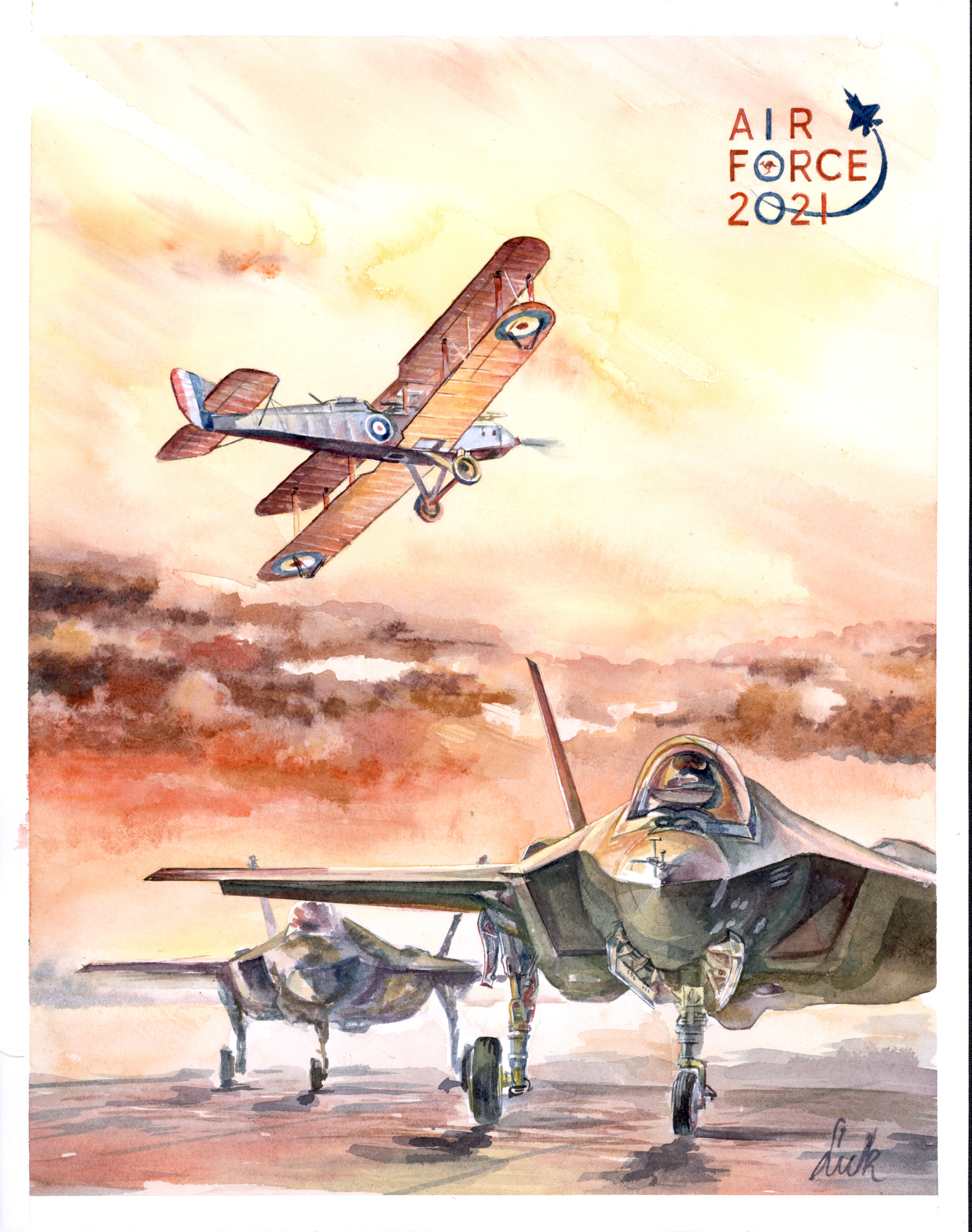
Poster celebrating the RAAF Centenary in 2021

During World War II, Narromine was the location of RAAF No.19 Inland Aircraft Fuel Depot (IAFD), completed in 1942 and closed on 14 June 1944. Usually consisting of 4 tanks, 31 fuel depots were built across Australia for the storage and supply of aircraft fuel for the RAAF and the US Army Air Forces at a total cost of £900,000 ($1,800,000).

==== World War II Empire Air Training Scheme ====
Australia contributed to the preparation of troops for World War II and provided a training organisation known as the Empire Air Training Scheme (EATS). The outbreak of war in Europe, 1939, saw the RAAF headquarters in Melbourne, Australia launch a plan to provide basic training to 28,000 aircrew over a three-year agreement. The facilitation of this training scheme produced forty schools in air navigation, bombing and gunnery, flying, and technical training for ground staff, come to fruition in the late 1930s. Narromine is listed as one of twelve locations for the training scheme as No.5 Elementary Flying Training School RAAF formed in 1940.

== Indigenous history ==
The Wiradjuri country are one of the largest Indigenous populations in central New South Wales and are traditional owners of the land in the Narromine district. Skilled in hunting and gathering, Wiradjuri tribes occupied much of the land between Wambool/Wambuul (renamed the Macquarie River by late settlers), the Kalar (the Lachlan River) and the Murrumbidgerie (Murrumbidgee River). Early European settlers appropriated Wiradjuri country from the 1820s, with the early establishment of the village of Dubbo in 1849, 52 km east of Narromine. In December 2021, the NSW government restored the river's traditional name, formally assigning the name Wambuul. The process was brought about by the Bathurst Local Aboriginal Land Council (BLALC) in 2020 and came immediately into effect. The towns situated on and around the Macquarie/Wambuul River, including Narromine, now use the names individually or combined as both are recognised with equal status. The term Wambuul means 'winding river' in Wiradjuri language.

== Geography ==
=== The Narromine Shire ===
There are a variety of small towns situated on the outskirts of the town but are within the Narromine district that make up the Narromine Shire local government. They are well-known areas to the Narromine community, as many residents travel and reside between towns on farms.

The main four neighbouring towns include:

- Tomingley (approximately 37 km South of Narromine along the Newell Highway)
- Trangie (approximately 46 km North-West of Narromine along the Mitchell Highway)
- Burroway (approximately 34 km North of Narromine along the McGrane Way)
- Dandaloo (approximately 65 km West of Narromine along Dandaloo Road)

=== Floods ===
Due to its proximity to the Macquarie River, parts of the Narromine township are flood liable. In late March 1926, Narromine experienced its biggest flood since 1893, with the Macquarie River peaking at 50 feet (15 m) at 5 am on 27 March. Narromine was isolated due to floodwaters cutting roads, telephone lines and the railway line. A large area of country around the town was covered in water. Very little damage was reported. In the floods of April 1990, the river peaked at Narromine at a record 15.93 metres (52.3 ft).

=== Flora ===
Multiple plant species are found within the Narromine district with some iconic Australian species noted for the area below:

- Grey box eucalyptus
- Leopardwood tree
- False sandalwood
- Old man saltbush
- River red gum
- Wilga shrub
- Weeping myall

=== Fauna ===
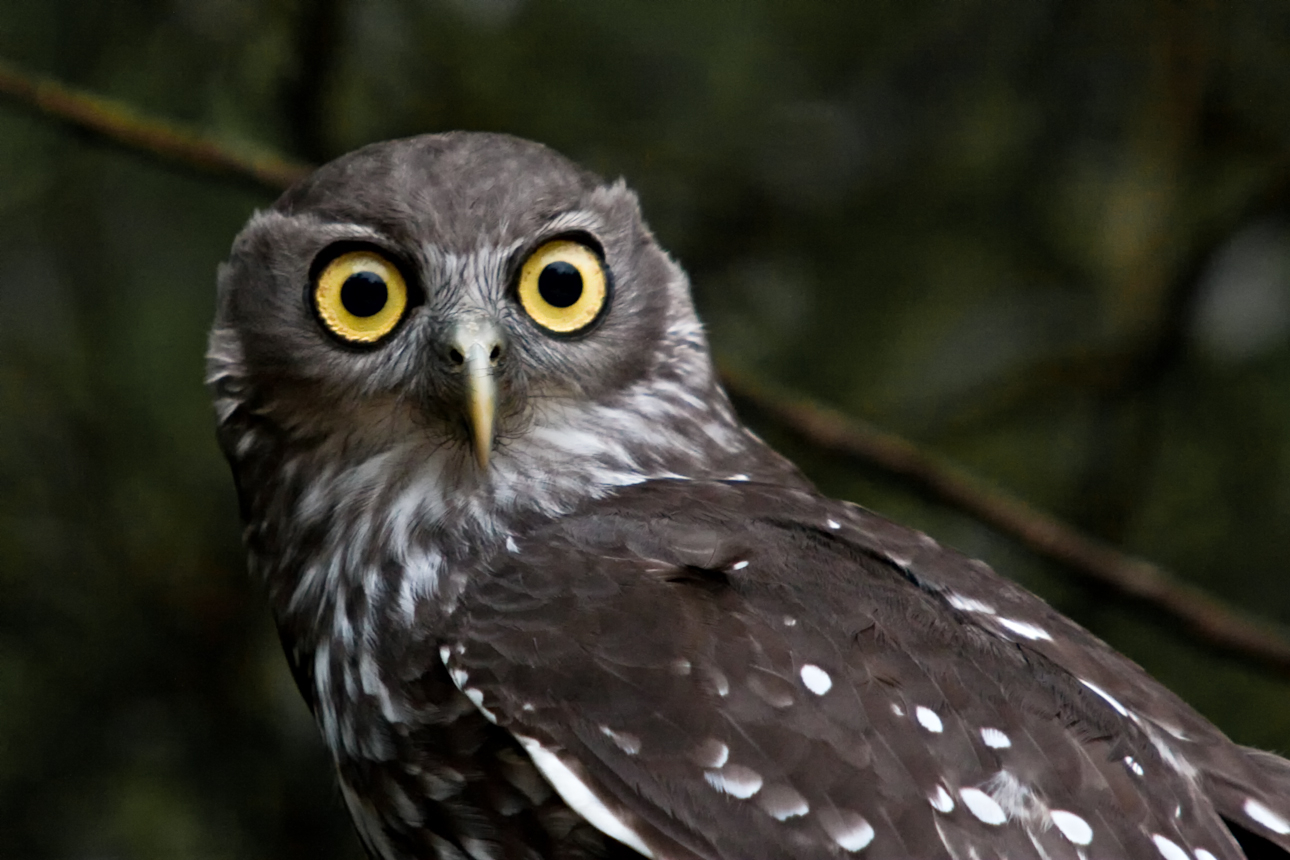
Barking owl, found in Central Australia

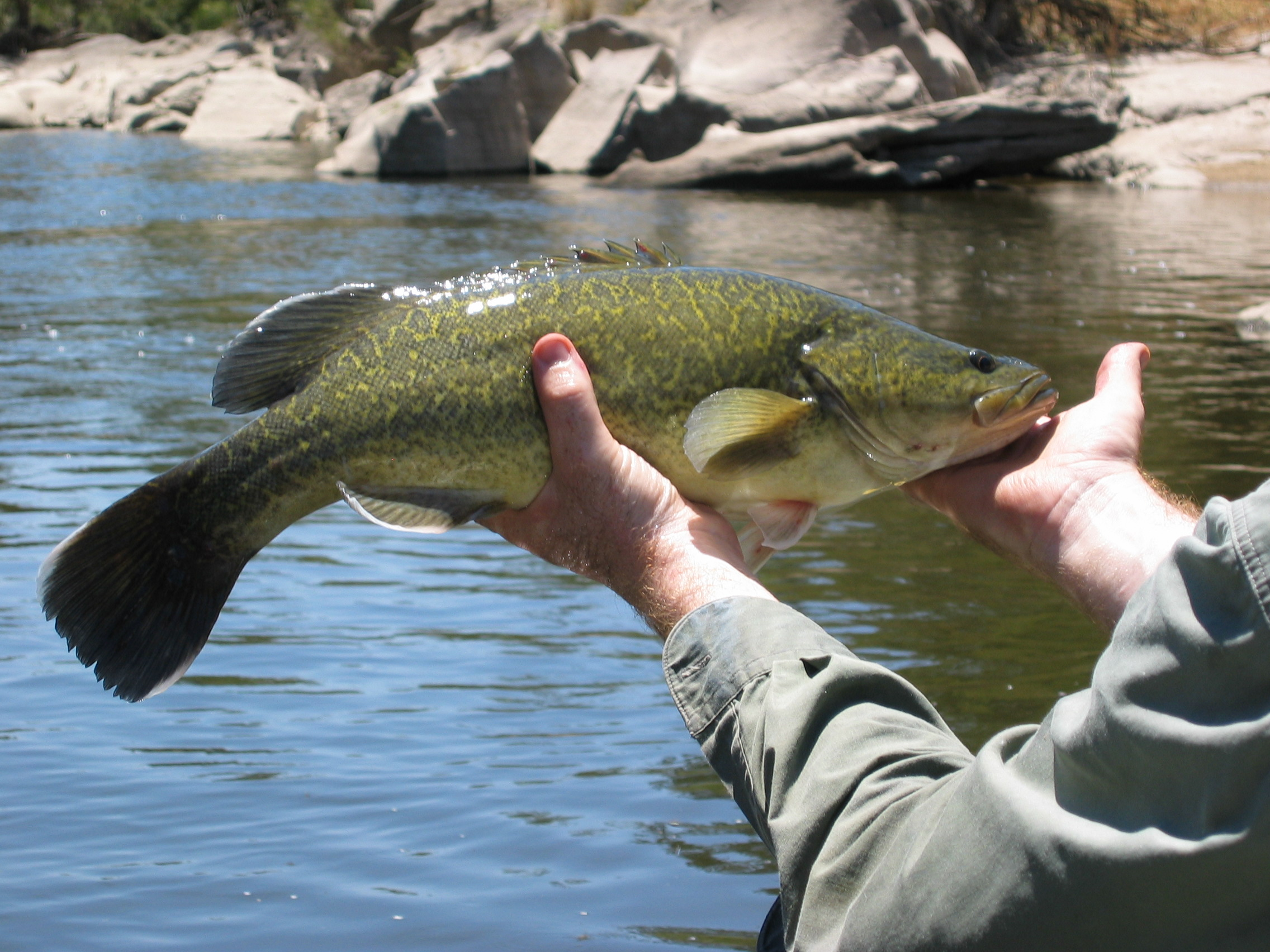
Small sized Murray cod

Narromine is home to many native Australian wildlife with some species noted below:

- Pied butcherbird
- Short-beaked echidna
- Barking owl
- Black falcon
- Weebill
- Spiny-cheeked honeyeater
- Grey-crowned babbler
- Magpie goose
- Spotted harrier
- Eastern blue-tongued lizard
- Murray cod

== Agricultural practices ==
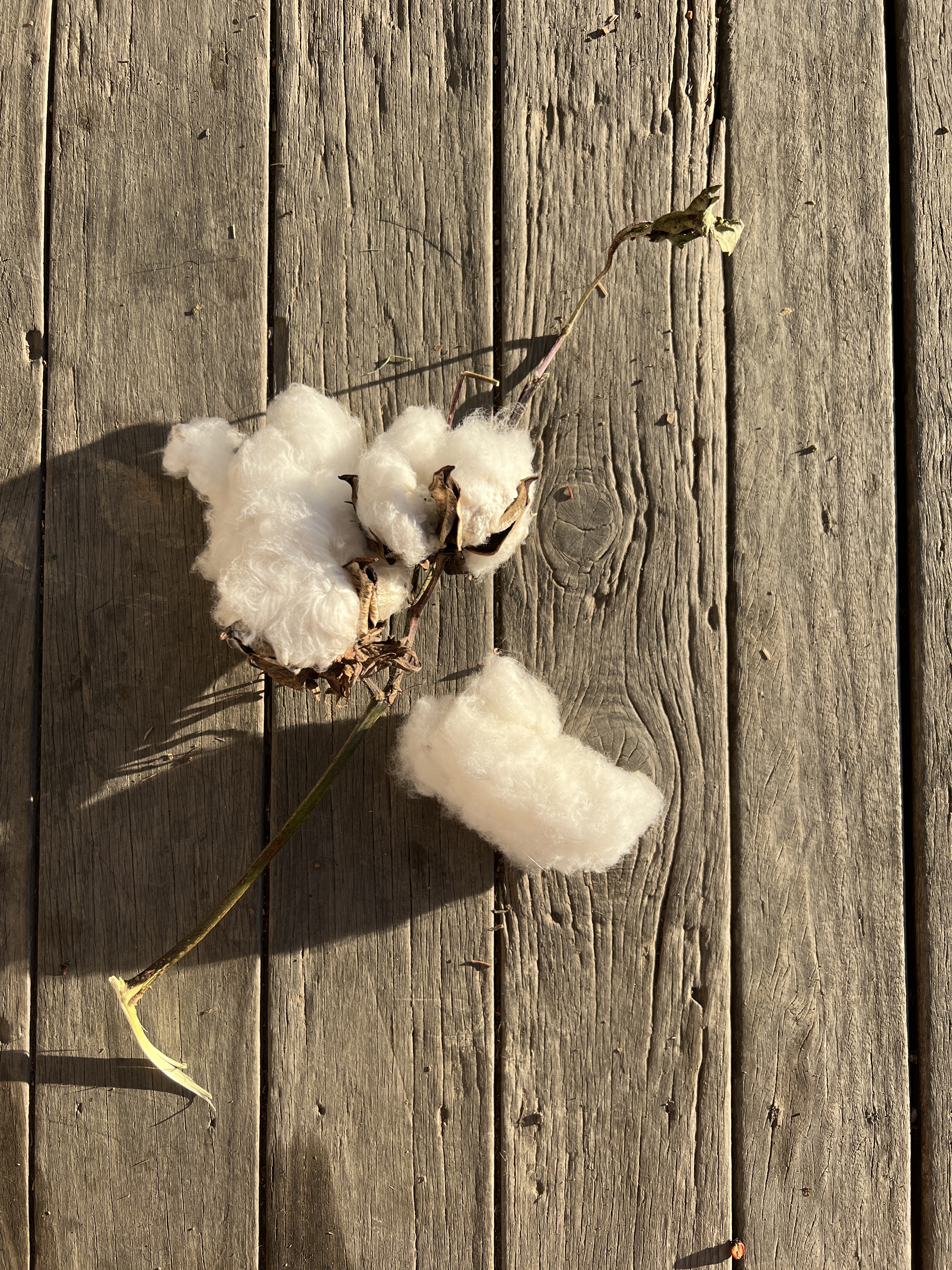
Weemabah Station cotton stem from the Narromine harvest of 2022

Situated in the Murray-Darling Basin region, Narromine's agricultural land is used for many dryland agricultural activities to remain adaptable when the rainfall is absent in a given cropping cycle. The production of beans, wheat and grain, as well as livestock products including wool, mutton, lamb and beef are all common agricultural practices in the Narromine district. Like many towns of the Central West region of New South Wales, traditionally the area is known to have adopted hybrid farming systems to integrate both cropping and livestock. This transition into hybrid farming was caused by the industrial revolution of the industry and technological advances.

=== Cotton farming ===
Narromine is one of the main growing regions for cotton in the Central West district of New South Wales, Australia, with irrigation agricultural activities remaining a major contributor to the area's economy. Cotton is a natural fibre, planted in spring, grown over summer and harvested in autumn for the region, cotton farming requires irrigated watering systems that are controlled. The production levels of cotton in Narromine, are dependent on water availability, with the quality of harvest reflected in rainfall and fluctuating river levels. Cotton in the area is produced from a variety of irrigation methods including flood irrigation, drip irrigation, spray irrigation and others. The Burrendong Dam was built between 1946 and 1967, which facilitated irrigation schemes that have greatly aided local agriculture in the town and its surrounding districts. Cotton farming came to the area as a result of advances in knowledge and technology/machinery around irrigation and utilising the water available from the surrounding water catchments.

== Economy ==
Agriculture, including sheep, cattle, wool, cereal and cotton production, has long been a central feature of the local economy. The town also has "major commercial nurseries and research facilities" supporting "the national forestry and vegetable industries". In 2014 gold mining commenced at nearby Tomingley.

== Tourism ==
=== Narromine Aviation Museum and Aero Club ===
With records of flights from Narromine dating back to early 1919, Narromine is known for Australia's longest standing aero club, with recorded flights dating back to 1919. The Aero Club was established ten years later in 1929. In 1935, commercial flights from Sydney to Narromine commenced for a limited number of passengers. The introduction of a small airline was celebrated at the time, with records showing the first fifty passengers published in newspapers weeks later to gain traction on the occasion. It has developed to international standards of flying, with planes transporting rural citizens daily to main Australian cities and towns. The plans to build the Narromine Aviation Museum begun in the early 1990s, with a committee forming and a National Tourism Development Program grant secured. The museum opened its doors in October 2002, with Australian aviator Nancy-Bird Walton launching the ceremony. The museum facilitates an auditorium to its local community, with a 200-person seating capacity available to hire for town events and meetings. It exhibits long standing and related artefacts, photographs, documents and records to the history of the towns influence in World War II. The museum is home to three distinct and well recognised aircraft including:

- A flyable replica of the 1907 Wright Flyer Model A (2005)
- An original Corben Super Ace amateur-built (1938)
- An original Hawkridge Venture glider (1953)

=== Narromine Gliding Club ===
The Narromine Gliding Club remains a popular destination for glider pilots, often hosting state, national and international-level gliding competitions.

In December 2015, the Narromine Gliding Club was host to the 9th FAI Junior World Gliding Championships in Club and Standard classes. The Standard class was won by Australian Matthew Scutter.

In December 2023, the Narromine Gliding Club was host to the 37th FAI World Gliding Championships in Club, Standard and 15m classes. The Club class was won by Australian James Nugent.

=== Mungery picnic races ===
Held annually on the outskirts of Narromine and on the banks of the Bogan River, is the Mungery Picnic horse racing. Traditional to Australian country races, are events such fashion in the field that includes best dressed lady, best dressed man, best dressed couple and best dressed juniors. Events such as race auctions, dash for cash activities, bookmakers and betting, as well as children's entertainment, food and drink services are also provided at the Mungery Picnic Races.

== Population ==
Historical population
| Year | Pop. | ±% |
|---|---|---|
| 1921 | 1,399 | — |
| 1933 | 1,617 | +15.6% |
| 1947 | 1,816 | +12.3% |
| 1954 | 1,975 | +8.8% |
| 1961 | 2,282 | +15.5% |
| 1966 | 2,466 | +8.1% |
| 1971 | 2,727 | +10.6% |
| 1976 | 2,802 | +2.8% |
| 1981 | 2,994 | +6.9% |
| 1986 | 3,205 | +7.0% |
| 1991 | 3,378 | +5.4% |
| 1996 | 3,486 | +3.2% |
| 2001 | 3,548 | +1.8% |
| 2006 | 3,599 | +1.4% |
| 2011 | 3,789 | +5.3% |
| 2016 | 3,528 | −6.9% |
| 2021 | 3,507 | −0.6% |
Source: Australian Bureau of Statistics data.

According to the 2021 census, the population Narromine was 3,507.

- Aboriginal and Torres Strait Islander people made up 24.9% of the population.
- 80.3% of people were born in Australia and 83.7% of people spoke only English at home
- The most common responses for religion were Catholic 24.9%, No Religion 23.1% and Anglican 20.1%.

== Personalities ==
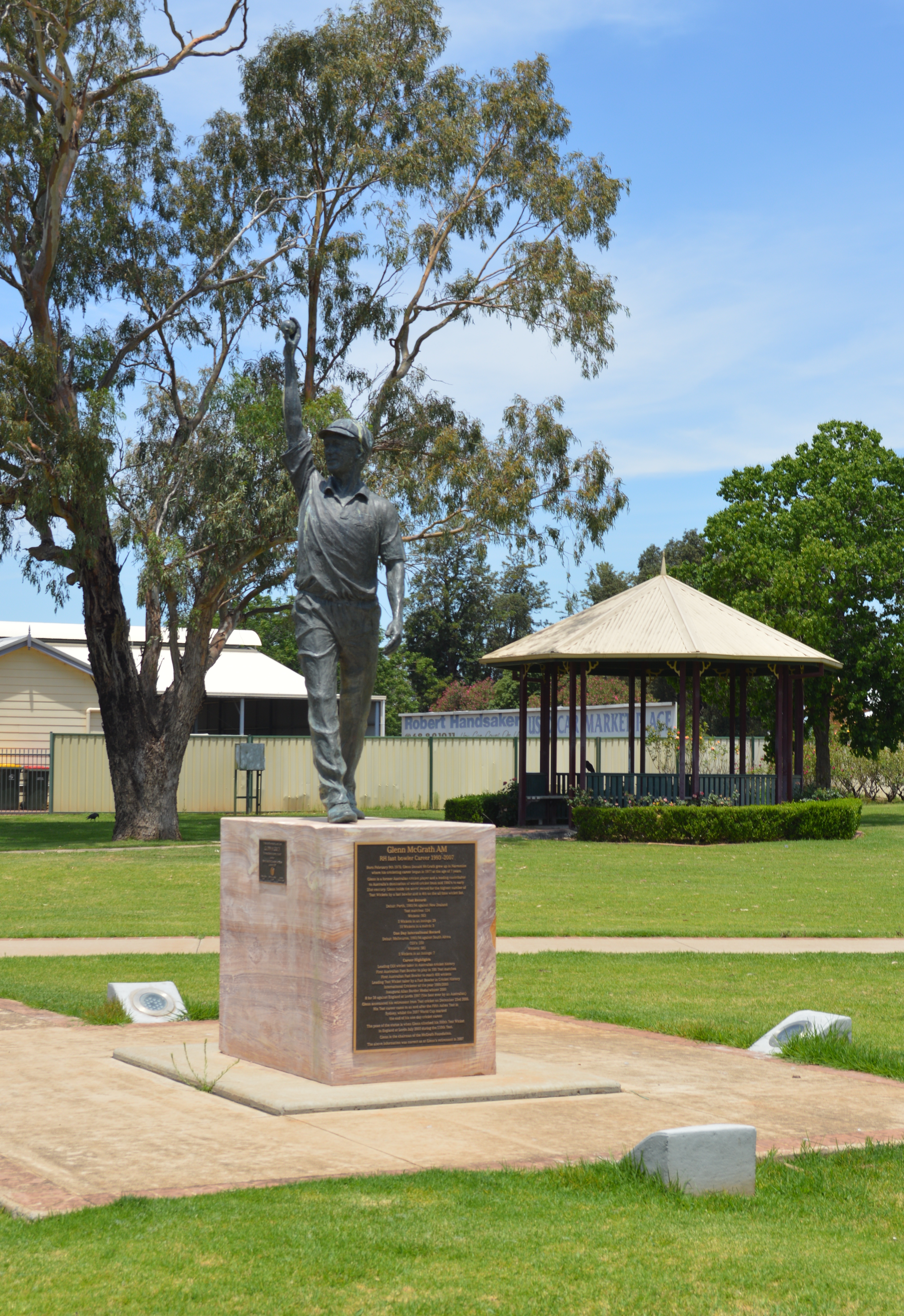
Statue of Glenn McGrath in Tom Terry Park, Narromine, erected in 2009

The town of Narromine has produced several success stories, most recently sports personalities Glenn McGrath (Australian cricket team: Fast bowler) and Melinda Gainsford-Taylor (Sprinter: Commonwealth Games medallist), and North Queensland Cowboys rugby league player Justin Smith. Other notable sportsmen to represent Australia at the International level include David Gillespie (Australian Rugby League) and David Jansen (International Gliding Championships). Disney animator Adam Phillips is also from Narromine.

The 1958 Melbourne Cup Winner, Baystone, was owned by the Burns family from Narromine: Robert Burns, and his two sons Norman and Noel.

A statue of Glenn McGrath was installed in Tom Perry Park in 2009.

== Sporting teams ==
Narromine is involved in regional sporting competitions. In rugby league, Narromine is represented by the Narromine Jets in the Group 11 Country Rugby League competition.

The town also boasts a successful rugby union team known as the Narromine Gorillas. Founded in 1982, the Gorillas have been a major force across the central west competitions and currently compete in the Blowes Clothing Cup.
