= Trangie =

- Town
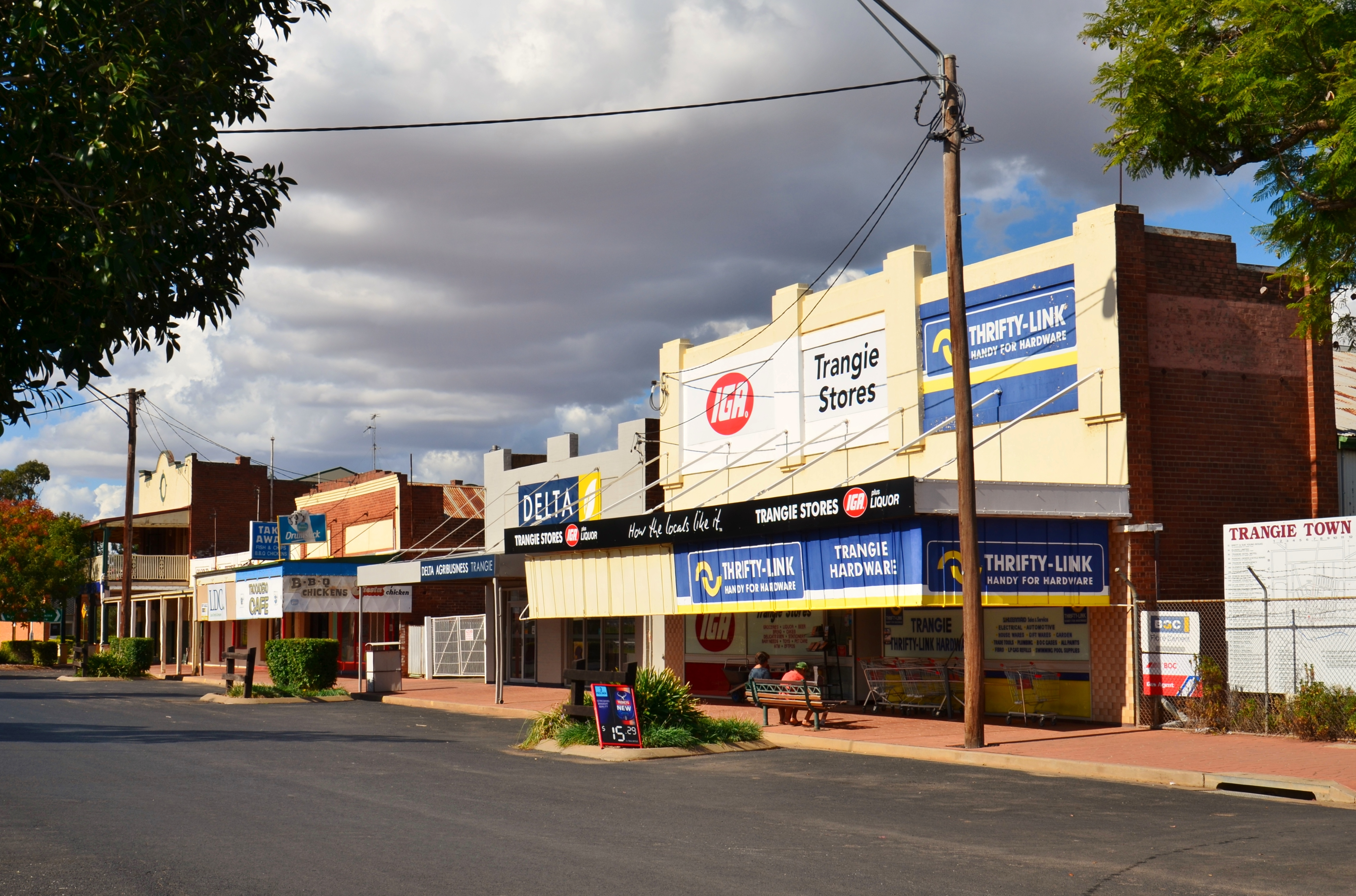
- The main street of Trangie

- Coordinates: 32°02′0″S 147°59′0″E
- Country: Australia
- State: New South Wales
- LGA: Narromine Shire
- Location: 485 km (301 mi) NW of Sydney; 76 km (47 mi) NW of Dubbo; 38 km (24 mi) NW of Narromine; 94 km (58 mi) WSW of Nyngan; 81 km (50 mi) NE of Tullamore

Government
  - State electorate: Dubbo
  - Federal division: Parkes
- Elevation: 215 m (705 ft)

Population
  - Total: 768 (2021 census)
- Postcode: 2823
- Mean max temp: 24.7 °C (76.5 °F)
- Mean min temp: 10.8 °C (51.4 °F)
- Annual rainfall: 499.9 mm (19.68 in)

Trangie is a town in the Orana region of New South Wales, Australia. The town is on the Mitchell Highway 485 kilometres (301 mi) north west of the state capital Sydney. It is part of Narromine Shire local government area. At the 2021 census, Trangie had a population of 768. Trangie is on the Main Western railway line, New South Wales

== Economy ==
The Trangie Research Centre is "one of the largest broadacre agricultural research centres in Australia".

== Population ==
Historical population
Year	Pop.	±%
1966	932	—
1971	967	+3.8%
1976	1,016	+5.1%
1981	977	−3.8%
1986	966	−1.1%
1991	991	+2.6%
1996	951	−4.0%
2001	940	−1.2%
2006	866	−7.9%
2011	849	−2.0%
2016	774	−8.8%
2021	768	−0.8%
Source: Australian Bureau of Statistics data.

According to the 2021 census of Population, there were 768 people in Trangie.

- Aboriginal and Torres Strait Islander people made up 21.9% of the population.
- 83.9% of people were born in Australia and 89.4% of people spoke only English at home.
- The most common responses for religion were Catholic 28.0%, Anglican 27.8% and no religion 16.0%.

== Climate ==
Climate data for Trangie Research Station AWS (1922–2024); 215 m AMSL; 31.99° S, 147.95° E
Month	Jan	Feb	Mar	Apr	May	Jun	Jul	Aug	Sep	Oct	Nov	Dec	Year
Record high °C (°F)	46.1 (115.0)	47.0 (116.6)	41.1 (106.0)	36.0 (96.8)	29.4 (84.9)	25.3 (77.5)	24.0 (75.2)	30.1 (86.2)	38.6 (101.5)	41.1 (106.0)	45.0 (113.0)	45.6 (114.1)	47.0 (116.6)
Mean daily maximum °C (°F)	33.6 (92.5)	32.3 (90.1)	29.4 (84.9)	24.5 (76.1)	19.9 (67.8)	16.1 (61.0)	15.4 (59.7)	17.4 (63.3)	21.1 (70.0)	25.4 (77.7)	29.0 (84.2)	31.9 (89.4)	24.7 (76.4)
Mean daily minimum °C (°F)	18.7 (65.7)	18.5 (65.3)	15.8 (60.4)	11.3 (52.3)	7.2 (45.0)	4.5 (40.1)	3.2 (37.8)	4.0 (39.2)	6.4 (43.5)	10.4 (50.7)	13.8 (56.8)	16.7 (62.1)	10.9 (51.6)
Record low °C (°F)	6.2 (43.2)	7.2 (45.0)	4.0 (39.2)	−1.0 (30.2)	−1.7 (28.9)	−5.0 (23.0)	−5.4 (22.3)	−5.0 (23.0)	−3.5 (25.7)	0.1 (32.2)	1.6 (34.9)	6.2 (43.2)	−5.4 (22.3)
Average precipitation mm (inches)	53.3 (2.10)	50.4 (1.98)	47.3 (1.86)	39.6 (1.56)	36.7 (1.44)	37.2 (1.46)	34.3 (1.35)	31.9 (1.26)	32.1 (1.26)	45.2 (1.78)	44.6 (1.76)	42.3 (1.67)	494.9 (19.48)
Average precipitation days (≥ 0.2 mm)	5.9	5.3	5.5	4.9	6.0	7.2	8.0	6.7	6.2	6.9	6.1	5.9	74.6
Average afternoon relative humidity (%)	33	36	37	41	50	58	57	49	44	33	33	29	42
Source: Australian Bureau of Meteorology

== Sport ==
Trangie Magpies formerly played in the Castlereagh Cup rugby league competition. Tennis player Lesley Turner Bowrey was born here in 1942, as well as rugby league player Justin Carney.
