= Narromine Shire =

- Local government area
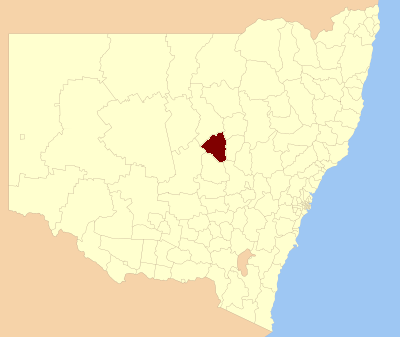
- Location in New South Wales

- Interactive map of Narromine Shire
- Coordinates: 32°14′S 148°14′E
- Country: Australia
- State: New South Wales
- Region: Orana
- Established: 1 January 1981
- Council seat: Narromine

Government
  - Mayor: Craig Davies (Independent)
  - State electorate: Dubbo
  - Federal division: Parkes

Area
  - Total: 5,264 km^{2} (2,032 sq mi)

Population
  - Totals: 6,444 (2016 census); 6,567 (2018 est.)
  - Density: 1.22416/km^{2} (3.1706/sq mi)
- Website: Narromine Shire
LGAs around Narromine Shire
Warren	Warren	Gilgandra
Lachlan	Narromine Shire	Dubbo
Lachlan	Parkes	Cabonne

Narromine Shire is a local government area in the Orana region of New South Wales, Australia. The Shire is located adjacent to the Mitchell Highway and the Main Western railway line. It was formed on 1 January 1981 from the amalgamation of the Municipality of Narromine and Timbrebongie Shire resulting from the Local Government Areas Amalgamation Act 1980.

Narromine Shire includes the towns of Narromine, Trangie and Tomingley.

The mayor of Narromine Shire Council is Craig Davies, an independent politician.

== Demographics ==
Selected historical census data for Narromine Shire local government area
Census year		2011	2016
Population	Estimated residents on census night	6,585	▼6,444
Population	LGA rank in terms of size within New South Wales	105th	▲103rd
Population	% of New South Wales population		
Population	% of Australian population		
Cultural and language diversity			
Ancestry, top responses	English		
Ancestry, top responses	Australian		
Ancestry, top responses	Italian		
Ancestry, top responses	Chinese		
Ancestry, top responses	Irish		
Language, top responses (other than English)	Italian		
Language, top responses (other than English)	Mandarin		
Language, top responses (other than English)	Cantonese		
Language, top responses (other than English)	Korean		
Language, top responses (other than English)	Greek		
Religious affiliation			
Religious affiliation, top responses	Catholic		
Religious affiliation, top responses	No religion		
Religious affiliation, top responses	Anglican		
Religious affiliation, top responses	Eastern Orthodox		
Religious affiliation, top responses	Buddhism		
Median weekly incomes			
Personal income	Median weekly personal income	A$	
Personal income	% of Australian median income		
Family income	Median weekly family income		
Family income	% of Australian median income		
Household income	Median weekly household income		
Household income	% of Australian median income		

== Council ==
=== Current composition and election method ===
Narromine Shire Council is composed of nine councillors elected proportionally as a single ward. All councillors are elected for a fixed four-year term of office. The mayor is elected by the councillors at the first meeting of the council.

== Election results ==
=== 2024 ===
2024 New South Wales local elections: Narromine
Party	Candidate	Votes	%	±%
Independent	Ewen Jones (elected 1)	584	16.1	+16.1
Independent National	Craig Davies (elected 2)	499	13.7	+13.7
Independent National	Brian Leak (elected 3)	425	11.7	+11.7
Independent	Judy Smith (elected 4)	421	11.6	+11.6
Independent	Stacey Bohm (elected 5)	364	10.0	+10.0
Independent	Peter Howe (elected 6)	328	9.0	+9.0
Independent	Lachlan Roberts (elected 8)	206	5.7	+5.7
Independent	Les Lambert (elected 9)	172	4.7	+4.7
Independent	Adine Hoey (elected 7)	169	4.7	+4.7
Independent	Rowan James	140	3.9	+3.9
Independent	Fiona Barbary	99	2.7	+2.7
Independent	Vaughan Ellen	93	2.6	+2.6
Independent	Christine Kelly	89	2.5	+2.5
Independent	Diane Sharpe	20	0.5	
Independent	Melanie Pryde	20	0.5	
Total formal votes		3,629	94.6	+94.6
Informal votes		207	5.4	+5.4
Turnout		3,836	81.6	+81.6
