= Olympic Highway =

Highway in New South Wales

Coordinates: 34°52′12″S 147°32′40″E

Olympic Highway New South Wales
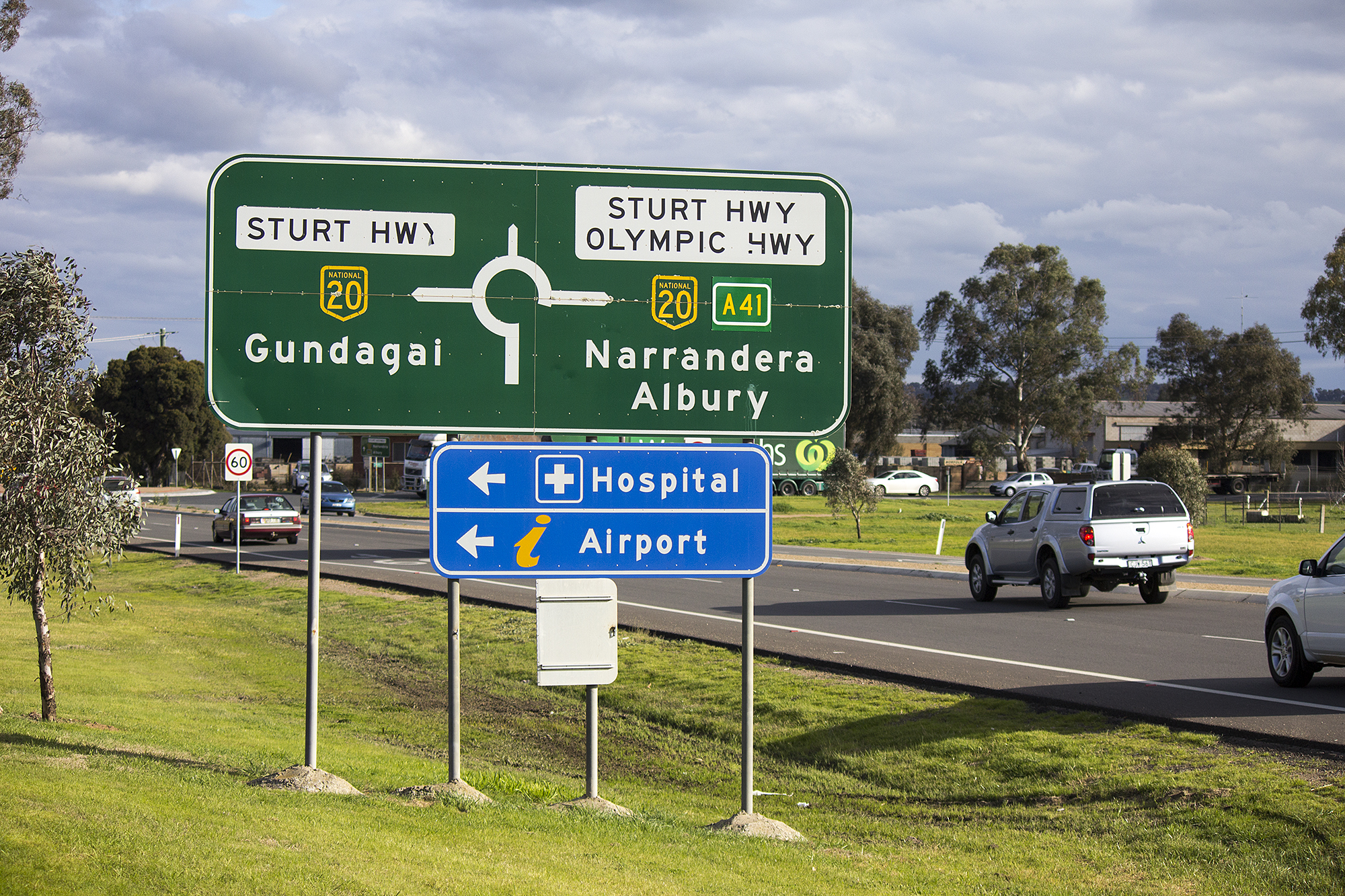
- Advance directional sign in Wagga Wagga, on the Olympic Highway heading south from Cootamundra
- Map of south-eastern Australia with Olympic Highway highlighted in green

General information
- Type: Rural road
- Length: 317 km (197 mi)
- Gazetted: August 1928 (as Main Roads 57 and 239); March 1938 (as Trunk Road 78)
- Route number(s): A41 (2013–present)
- Former route number: National Route 41 (1974–2013)

Major junctions
- Northeast end: Mid-Western Highway; Cowra, New South Wales
- Burley Griffin Way; Goldfields Way; Sturt Highway
- Southwest end: Hume Highway; Table Top, New South Wales

Location(s)
- Major settlements: Young, Cootamundra, Wagga Wagga, Culcairn

Olympic Highway is a 317-kilometre (197 mi) rural road in the central western and south-eastern Riverina regions of New South Wales, Australia. It services rural communities, links Hume Highway with Mid-Western Highway, and provides part of an alternate road link between Sydney and Albury via Bathurst and Cowra as well as servicing Wagga Wagga, linking with Sturt Highway.

== Route ==
Olympic Highway runs generally north–south, roughly aligned to sections of the Sydney–Melbourne and the Blayney–Demondrille railway lines. A 2-kilometre (1.2 mi) section through Wagga Wagga is a four-lane divided urban road where it is concurrent with Sturt Highway. Olympic Highway approximately parallels Hume Highway to the east and Newell Highway to the west, sharing a short concurrency with Sturt Highway in Wagga Wagga. It is mostly single carriageway and also includes wider sections within urban areas and some passing lanes. Where the road passes through suburban areas it accommodates both parking and pedestrian needs of the town shopping centre and highway through traffic.

At its northern terminus in Cowra, Olympic Highway meets Mid-Western Highway, along which route A41 continues east to Bathurst, and west as route B64 to Grenfell; and Lachlan Valley Way that generally runs northwest–southwest between Forbes and Boorowa and beyond. Olympic Highway heads generally south by west through Koorawatha, Young, Cootamundra, Junee, Wagga Wagga, and Culcairn towards its southern terminus via a trumpet interchange with Hume Highway located 18 kilometres (11 mi) north of Albury at Table Top.

The only major river crossing is the Murrumbidgee River, crossed between Boorooma and Wagga via the Gobbagombalin Bridge, at 1.4 kilometres (0.87 mi) long believed to be the longest continuous-span viaduct in New South Wales, situated about 6 kilometres (3.7 mi) northwest of the Wagga CBD and opened on 26 July 1997. Prior to the completion of the "Gobba" Bridge, the Olympic Highway followed a route that took it through the Wagga central business district via the Hampden Bridge, a wooden Allan Truss bridge that was opened in 1895 and eventually demolished in 2014.

== History ==
The passing of the Main Roads Act of 1924 through the Parliament of New South Wales provided for the declaration of Main Roads, roads partially funded by the State government through the Main Roads Board (later the Department of Main Roads, and eventually Transport for NSW). Main Road No. 57 was declared from the intersection with Monaro Highway (today Sturt Highway) at Wagga Wagga to Old Junee and continuing north via Temora, Wyalong, Condobolin and Tullamore to the intersection with North-Western Highway (today Mitchell Highway) at Trangie, Main Road No. 210 was declared from the intersection with Hume Highway near Ettamogah, via Culcairn, Henty to the intersection with Wagga-Narrandera Road (today Sturt Highway) at Wagga Wagga, Main Road No. 239 was declared from Young to Wombat (and continuing southwards to Murrumburrah, and northwards to Grenfell), and Main Road No. 243 was declared from Junee to Wallendbeen (and continuing westwards via Coolamon and Grong Grong to Narrandera, and continuing eastwards via Harden to Bowning), on the same day, 8 August 1928. With the passing of the Main Roads (Amendment) Act of 1929 to provide for additional declarations of State Highways and Trunk Roads, this was amended to Trunk Road 57 and Main Roads 210 and 239 and 243 on 8 April 1929.

The Department of Main Roads, which had succeeded the MRB in 1932, truncated the eastern end of Main Road 243 to Junee on 16 March 1938 (with its western end terminating at the newly declared State Highway 17, later Newell Highway, at Narrandera). Trunk Road 57 was extended south, from Wagga Wagga via Henty and Culcairn to the intersection with Hume Highway near Ettamogah (subsuming Main Road 210), and declared Trunk Road 78 from the intersection with Mid-Western Highway in Cowra via Young, Wombat, Wallandbeen and Cootamundra to Junee (the southern end of Main Road 239 was truncated to meet Trunk Road 78 at Young), on the same day, 29 June 1938; Trunk Road 78 was later extended a short distance west past Junee to the intersection with Trunk Road 57 south of Old Junee on 17 May 1939.

Trunk Road 78 was extended further south via Wagga Wagga, Henty and Culcairn to the intersection with Hume Highway near Ettamogah (subsuming the former alignment of Trunk Road 57, which was truncated just south of Old Junee) and was officially named Olympic Way on 19 June 1963, in honour of part of the path that the Olympic Torch took on its journey from Cowra to Albury for the 1956 Melbourne Olympic Games. The southern end of Olympic Way was re-aligned on 1 July 1988, to run from Gerogery directly south to terminate at the current-day intersection with Hume Highway roughly 10 km north of its previous terminus at Ettamogah (the former alignment is now known as Gerogery Road).

The passing of the Roads Act of 1993 through the Parliament of New South Wales updated road classifications and the way they could be declared within New South Wales. Under this act, Olympic Way was renamed Olympic Highway in 1996, and the route between Wagga Wagga and Cowra was used again for the 2000 Sydney Olympic Games torch relay. Olympic Highway today retains its declaration as Main Road 78, but despite its name, the road is not an official highway as classified by Transport for NSW, and is considered a rural road.

Olympic Highway was signed National Route 41 across its entire length in 1974. With the conversion to the newer alphanumeric system in both states in 2013, this was replaced with route A41.

== Major intersections ==
LGA	Location	km	mi	Destinations	Notes
Cowra	Cowra	0	0.0	Mid-Western Highway (A41 east, B64 west) – Grenfell, Forbes, Bathurst, Canowindra	Northern terminus of highway, route A41 continues east along Mid-Western Highway
Hilltops	Koorawatha	25.6	15.9	Greenethorpe–Koorawatha Road (west) – Greenethorpe; Prince Street (south) – Koorawatha	
Hilltops	Young	67.3	41.8	Iandra Avenue, to Henry Lawson Way – Grenfell, Forbes, Young Airport	
Hilltops	Young	69.1	42.9	Lovell Street, to Murringo Road (east) – Murringo, Boorowa; Boorowa Street (west) – Young	Roundabout
Hilltops	Wombat	83.4	51.8	Harden–Wombat Road – Murrumburrah, Harden	
Cootamundra-Gundagai	Wallendbeen	91.1	56.6	Burley Griffin Way (B94) – Harden, Yass, Temora, Griffith	Roundabout
Junee	Junee	171	106	Wantabadgery Road – Gundagai	
Junee	Junee	171.1	106.3	Broadway Street, to Junee–Coolamon Road – Coolamon, Temora	Roundabout
Junee	Junee	172	107	Kemp Street, to Junee–Harefield Road – Harefield	
Junee	Old Junee	179	111	Goldfields Way (B85) – Temora, West Wyalong	
Wagga Wagga	Wagga Wagga	206	128	Coolamon Road – Coolamon, Ardlethan	Roundabout
Murrumbidgee River		211	131	Gobbagombalin Bridge	
Wagga Wagga	Wagga Wagga	213	132	Sturt Highway (A20 east) – Gundagai	Concurrency with Sturt Highway
Wagga Wagga	Wagga Wagga	215	134	Sturt Highway (A20 west) – Narrandera	Concurrency with Sturt Highway
Lockhart	The Rock	241	150	Urana Street, to Lockhart-The Rock Road (north) – Lockhart, Collingullie; Mangoplah-The Rock Road (south) – Mangoplah	
Greater Hume	Culcairn	288	179	Balfour Street (east), to Culcairn–Holbrook Road – Holbrook; Mellville Street (south) – Culcairn	
Greater Hume	Culcairn	288.1	179.0	Balfour Street (west), to Walbundrie Road – Walbundrie; Railway Parade (north) – Culcairn	Roundabout
Greater Hume	Gerogery	307	191	Main Street, to Gerogery Road – Jindera, Burrumbuttock	
Albury	Table Top	318	198	Hume Highway (M31) – Gundagai, Albury, Melbourne	Southern terminus of highway and route A41 at trumpet interchange
1.000 mi = 1.609 km; 1.000 km = 0.621 mi: Concurrency terminus; Route transition

== Gallery ==
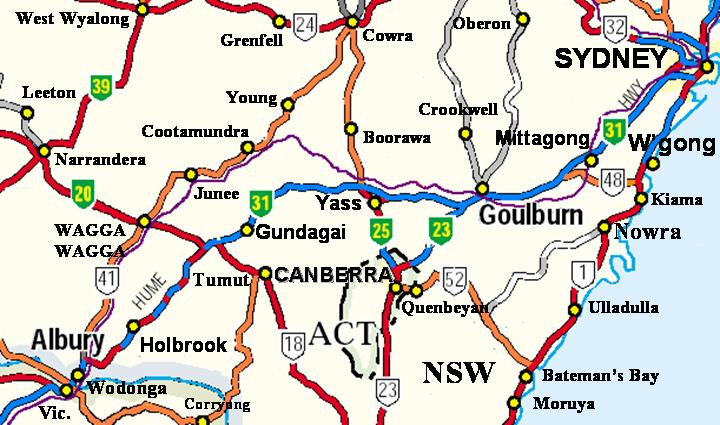
Olympic Highway, route A41, links Albury to Cowra

== See also ==
- Highways in Australia
- Highways in New South Wales
