= Mid-Western Highway =

Highway in New South Wales

Mid-Western Highway New South Wales
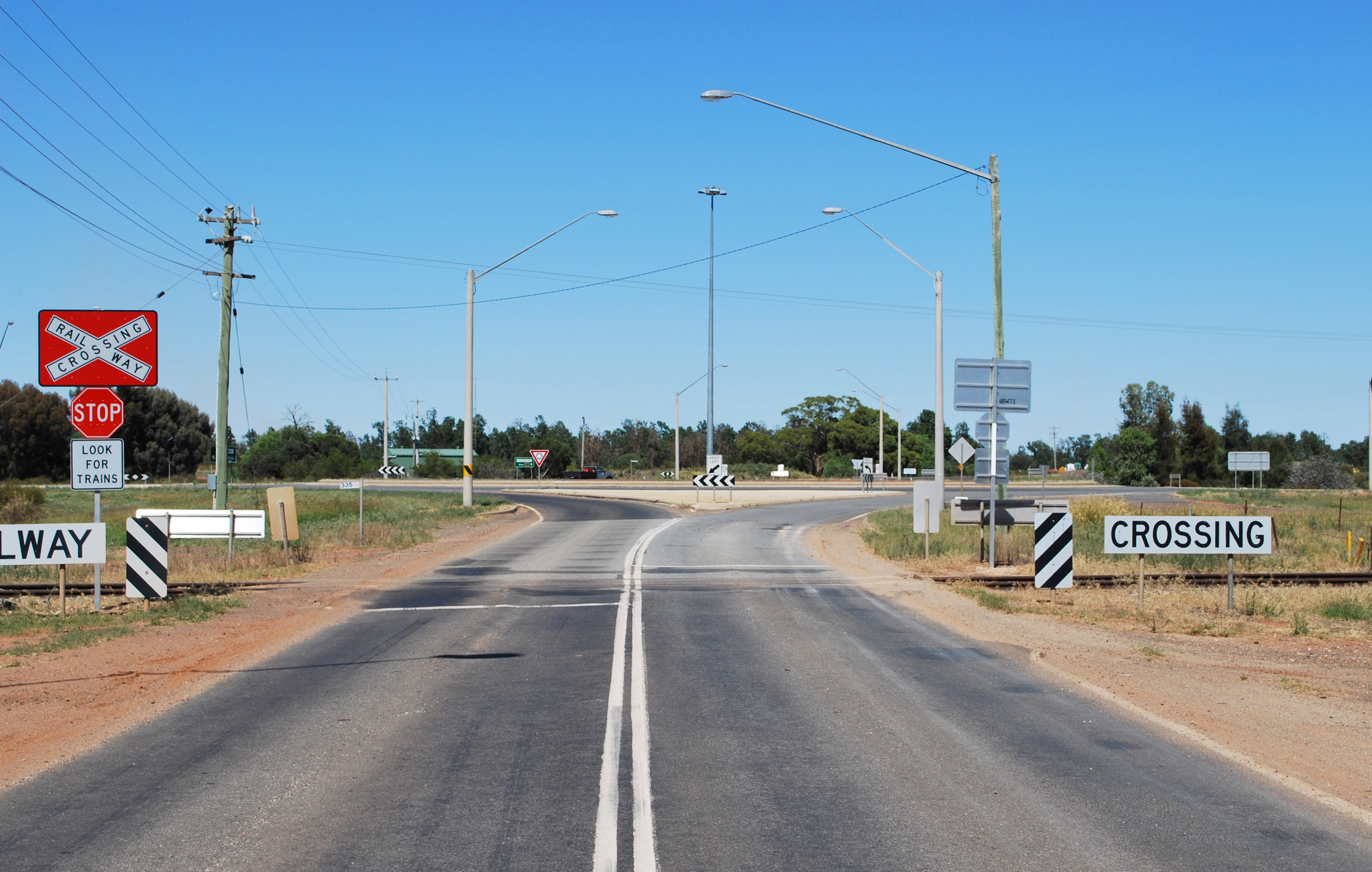
- A level crossing on Mid-Western Highway near Goolgowi, with a roundabout connecting with Kidman Way in the background

General information
- Type: Highway
- Length: 518 km (322 mi)
- Gazetted: August 1928 (as Main Road 6)
- Route number(s): B64 (2013–present) (Hay–Cowra); A41 (2013–present) (Cowra–Bathurst); Concurrency: A39 (2013-present) (West Wyalong–Carabagal)
- Former route number: National Route 24 (1955–2013); Entire route

Major junctions
- West end: Cobb Highway; Hay, New South Wales
- Kidman Way; Newell Highway; Goldfields Way; Olympic Highway; Lachlan Valley Way; Mitchell Highway
- East end: Great Western Highway; Bathurst, New South Wales

Location(s)
- Major settlements: Goolgowi, Rankins Springs, West Wyalong, Grenfell, Cowra, Blayney

Highway system
- Highways in Australia; National Highway • Freeways in Australia; Highways in New South Wales

Mid-Western Highway, sometimes Mid Western Highway, is a 518-kilometre (322 mi) state highway located in the central western and northern Riverina regions of New South Wales, Australia. The highway services rural communities and links the Great Western, Mitchell, Olympic, Newell, Cobb and Sturt highways. Mid-Western Highway forms part of the most direct route road link between Sydney and Adelaide, with its eastern terminus in Bathurst and western terminus in Hay. It is designated part of route A41 between Bathurst and Cowra, and route B64 between Cowra and Hay.

During 2014 the Roads & Maritime Services in conjunction with the NSW Geographical Names Board commenced a consultation process to change the name of the highway to the Wiradjuri Highway, as the only state highway to lie fully within the Wiradjuri cultural area.

== Route ==
Mid-Western Highway runs generally west–east, roughly aligned along the Lachlan River in New South Wales, then stretching across the Hay Plain, generally towards the south-western corner of New South Wales. The highway is a single carriageway along its entire length, and shares a concurrency with Newell Highway between Marsden and West Wyalong.

Mid-Western Highway commences at the intersection with the Great Western and Mitchell Highways in the city of Bathurst. Heading west by southwest, the highway carries the A41 shield and passes through Blayney, Carcoar where the village is bypassed in 1975, and to Cowra where the highway crosses the Lachlan River, forms the northern terminus of Olympic Highway and provides access to Lachlan Valley Way. At Cowra the highway heads west, now designated route B64 to Grenfell, with a link to Henry Lawson Way as the highway heads further west to its junction with Newell Highway at Marsden. From Mardsen to West Wyalong, Newell Highway is concurrently signed as routes A39 and B64. Mid-Western Highway recommences west of West Wyalong and continues further west through Weethalle, and then southwest to Rankins Springs and Goolgowi, before reaching its western terminus in Hay at the intersection with Cobb Highway.

Following the upgrade of Hume Highway to a dual carriageway along the vast majority of its length in New South Wales, and the declaration of Sturt Highway as a national highway – despite Mid-Western Highway being the most direct route between Sydney and Adelaide – the route via the Hume and Sturt Highways through Wagga Wagga offers motorists a quicker route, despite being approximately 20 kilometres (12 mi) longer.

The only major river crossing is the Lachlan River at Cowra.

== History ==
The passing of the Main Roads Act of 1924 through the Parliament of New South Wales provided for the declaration of Main Roads, roads partially funded by the State government through the Main Roads Board (MRB, later Transport for NSW). Mid-Western Highway was declared (as Main Road No. 6) on 8 August 1928, from the interchange with Great Western Highway and North-Western Highway (today Mitchell Highway) in Bathurst, via Blayney, Cowra, Wyalong, Rankins Springs, Gunbar, Booligal, Oxley, Balranald, Euston, and Wentworth, to the border with South Australia beyond Lake Victoria; with the passing of the Main Roads (Amendment) Act of 1929 to provide for additional declarations of State Highways and Trunk Roads, this was amended to State Highway 6 on 8 April 1929. The highway was rerouted between Gunbar and Balranald to pass through Hay on 24 September 1929.

The Department of Main Roads, which had succeeded the MRB in the previous year, proclaimed the portion of the highway between Hay via Euston and Wentworth to the South Australian border to be part of Sturt Highway on 8 August 1933; the highway's western end was truncated at its own junction with Sturt Highway at Hay instead. This was further altered when State Highway 21 (later Cobb Highway) was altered to run through Hay on 12 January 1944; Mid-Western Highway was further truncated to the intersection with State Highway 21 in Hay as a result. Newell Highway was declared a National Highway in 1992, and was re-declared to form one continuous highway on 15 January 1993: as a consequence, Mid-Western Highway was re-declared to run from Hay to West Wyalong, and then from Marsden to Bathurst.

The passing of the Roads Act of 1993 updated road classifications and the way they could be declared within New South Wales. Under this act, Mid-Western Highway today retains its declaration as Highway 6, from Hay via Goolgowi and Rankin Springs to the intersection with Newell Highway at West Wyalong, then from the intersection of Newell Highway at Marsden via Grenfell and Cowra to Bathurst.

Mid-Western Highway was signed National Route 24 across its entire length in 1955. With the conversion to the newer alphanumeric system in 2013, this was replaced with route A41 between Bathurst and Cowra, and route B64 between Cowra and Hay.

== Major intersections ==
| LGA | Location | km | mi | Destinations | Notes |
|---|---|---|---|---|---|
| Bathurst | Bathurst | 0 | 0.0 | Mitchell Highway (A32 west) – Orange, Dubbo; Great Western Highway (A32 east) – Lithgow, Katoomba, Sydney | Eastern terminus of eastern section of highway and route A41 |
| Cowra | Cowra | 104 | 65 | Lachlan Valley Way (B81 northwest) – Gooloogong, Forbes, Condobolin | Northern concurrency terminus with route B81 |
| Lachlan River | | 104 | 65 | Cowra Bridge | |
| Cowra | Cowra | 105 | 65 | Lachlan Valley Way (B81 southeast) – Boorowa, Bowning | Southern concurrency terminus with route B81 |
| Cowra | Cowra | 105 | 65 | Olympic Highway (A41 southwest) – Young, Junee, Wagga Wagga | Eastern terminus of route B64, route A41 continues south along Olympic Highway |
| Weddin | Grenfell | 158 | 98 | Henry Lawson Way (southeast) – Young | Concurrency with Henry Lawson Way |
| Weddin | Grenfell | 167 | 104 | Henry Lawson Way (northwest) – Forbes | Concurrency with Henry Lawson Way |
| Bland | Marsden | 227 | 141 | Newell Highway (A39 north, A39/B64 southwest) – West Wyalong, Dubbo | Western terminus of eastern section of highway, route B64 continues southwest along Newell Highway |
Gap in route
| Bland | West Wyalong | 265 | 165 | Newell Highway (A39 south, A39/B64 east) – Narrandera, Tocumwal | Eastern terminus of western section of highway, route B64 continues west along Mid-Western Highway |
| Bland | West Wyalong | 265 | 165 | Ungarie Road – Condobolin, Lake Cargelligo | |
| Carrathool | Goolgowi | 411 | 255 | Kidman Way (B87) – Bourke, Cobar, Hillston, Griffith | Roundabout |
| Hay | Hay | 518 | 322 | Cobb Highway (B75) – Wilcannia, Ivanhoe, Deniliquin, Echuca | Western terminus of western section of highway and route B64 |
1.000 mi = 1.609 km; 1.000 km = 0.621 mi: Concurrency terminus; Route transition

== See also ==
- Highways in Australia
- List of highways in New South Wales
