= Henry Lawson Way =

Road in New South Wales, Australia

Henry Lawson Way New South Wales
- Coordinates: 33.419537°S 148.031485°E (North end); 34.295819°S 148.298117°E (South end)

General information
- Type: Rural road
- Length: 109 km (68 mi)
- Gazetted: August 1928

Major junctions
- North end: Lachlan Valley Way; Forbes, New South Wales
- Mid-Western Highway
- South end: Olympic Highway; Young, New South Wales

Location(s)
- Major settlements: Grenfell

Henry Lawson Way is a 109-kilometre (68 mi) sealed rural road that links Forbes and Young in the central western region of New South Wales, Australia. The road is named in honour of Henry Lawson (1867–1922), an Australian writer and poet, who was born in a town on the Grenfell goldfields, located adjacent to the modern-day rural road.

== Route ==
Henry Lawson Way commences at the intersection with Gooloogong-Forbes Road (Lachlan Valley Way) in Forbes and heads in a southerly direction over relatively flat countryside, crossing the Bundaburrah Creek and Ooma Creek, before it meets Mid-Western Highway just west of Grenfell. Henry Lawson Way recommences at Grenfell and heads south (along Weddin Street) towards Young through highly undulating countryside, to eventually terminate (as Iandra Street) at the intersection with Olympic Highway in Young.

== History ==
The passing of the Main Roads Act of 1924 through the Parliament of New South Wales provided for the declaration of Main Roads, roads partially funded by the State government through the Main Roads Board (later the Department of Main Roads, and eventually Transport for NSW). Main Road No. 236 was declared from Forbes to Bogo Bogalong, just west of Grenfell, and Main Road No. 239 was declared from Grenfell to Young (and continuing southwards via Wombat to Murrumburrah) on the same day, 8 August 1928; with the passing of the Main Roads (Amendment) Act of 1929 to provide for additional declarations of State Highways and Trunk Roads, these were amended to Main Roads 236 and 239 on 8 April 1929.

The Department of Main Roads, which had succeeded the MRB in 1932, truncated the southern end of Main Road 239 to Young (when Trunk Road 78 was declared from Cowra to Junee, subsuming Main Road 239 from Young to Wombat) on 29 June 1938.

The full route between Forbes and Bogo Bogalong (Main Road 236), and between Grenfell and Young (Main Road 239), was officially named Henry Lawson Way on 20 March 1963.

The passing of the Roads Act of 1993 updated road classifications and the way they could be declared within New South Wales. Under this act, Henry Lawson Way today retains its declarations as Main Roads 236 and 239.

== Major intersections ==
LGA	Location	km	mi	Destinations	Notes
Forbes	Forbes	0.0	0.0	Lachlan Valley Way – Gooloogong, Cowra	Northern terminus of northern section of road
Bundaburrah Creek		4.9	3.0	Bridge over creek (name not known)	
Bundaburrah Creek overflow		5.3	3.3	Bridge over creek (name not known)	
Ooma Creek		16.5	10.3	Bridge over creek (name not known)	
Weddin	Bogo Bogalong	50.2	31.2	Mid-Western Highway (B64 west) – Caragabal, Hay	Southern terminus of northern section of road
Gap in route
Weddin	Grenfell	59.3	36.8	Mid-Western Highway (B64 east) – Cowra, Bathurst	Northern terminus of southern section of road
Weddin	Grenfell	59.3	36.8	Weddin Street (north) – Grenfell	
Hilltops	Young	109	68	Olympic Highway – Bathurst, Cowra, Cootamundra, Wagga Wagga	Southern terminus of southern section of road
1.000 mi = 1.609 km; 1.000 km = 0.621 mi: Route transition

== See also ==
- Highways in Australia
- List of highways in New South Wales
