= Lachlan Valley Way =

Highway in New South Wales

Lachlan Valley Way New South Wales
- Coordinates: 33.866832°S 144.887984°E (West end); 34.788632°S 148.857467°E (East end)

General information
- Type: Rural road
- Length: 568 km (353 mi)
- Gazetted: August 1928
- Route number(s): B81 (2013–present) (Cowra–Bowning)
- Former route number: State Route 81 (1974–2013) (Cowra–Bowning)

Major junctions
- West end: Cobb Highway; Booligal, New South Wales
- Kidman Way; Newell Highway; The Escort Way; Henry Lawson Way; Mid-Western Highway; Olympic Highway
- East end: Hume Highway; Bowning, New South Wales

Location(s)
- Major settlements: Hillston, Lake Cargelligo, Condobolin, Forbes, Gooloogong, Cowra, Boorowa

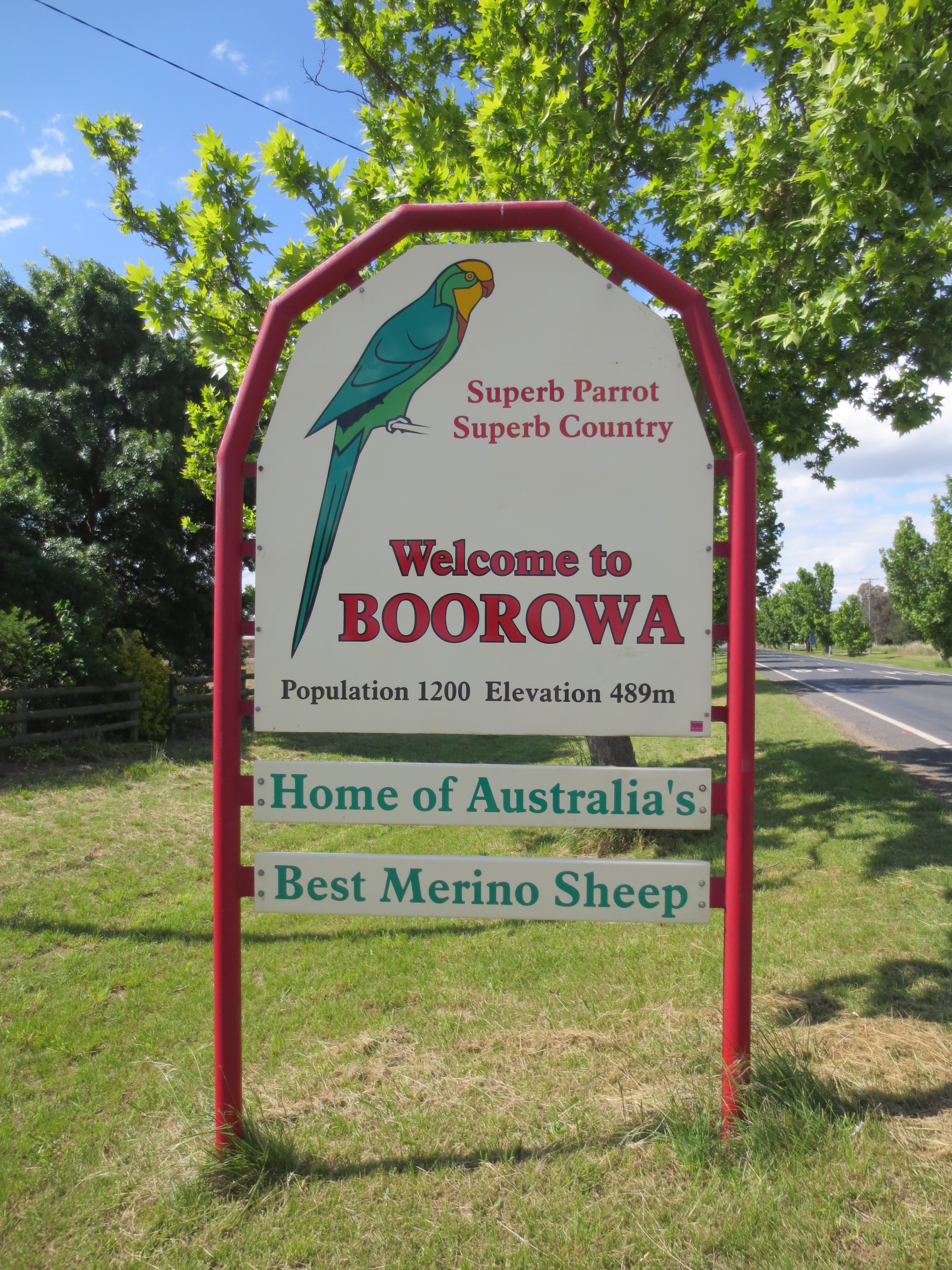
Road entry sign to Boorowa on Lachlan Valley Way

Lachlan Valley Way is a New South Wales country road running from Booligal to north of Yass. It was named after the Lachlan River, and follows its southern bank for the majority of its length.

== Route ==
Lachlan Valley Way commences at the intersection with Cobb Highway in Booligal and heads in a north-easterly direction for about 76 km (47 mi) to Hillston. It then follows the Kidman Way (B87) to the east and north-east for about 35 km (22 mi) before turning off to the east and proceeding a further 57 km (35 mi) to Lake Cargelligo. From there it continues to the north and east through Euabalong to Condobolin. This 93 km (58 mi) section of road has three named parts, from west to east. They are Lake Cargelligo-Euabalong Road, Lachlan Valley Way, and Condobolin-Lake Cargelligo Road. From Condobolin the Lachlan Valley Way turns south-east towards Forbes, a further 98 km (61 mi). From Forbes it continues south-east through Gooloogong to Cowra, a further 90 km (56 mi). It then turns south through Boorowa, to end after another 119 km (74 mi) at the Hume Highway north-west of Yass.

== History ==
The passing of the Main Roads Act of 1924 through the Parliament of New South Wales provided for the declaration of Main Roads, roads partially funded by the State government through the Main Roads Board (later the Department of Main Roads, and eventually Transport for NSW). Main Road No. 56 was declared along this road from Forbes, via Cowra to Yass (and continuing northwards via Parkes, Dubbo, Gilgandra and Coonamble eventually to Walgett, and southwards via Canberra eventually to the intersection with Queanbeyan-Braidwood Road, today Kings Highway, at Queanbeyan), Main Road No. 61 from Condoblin to Forbes (and continuing eastwards via Eugowra and Cudal to the intersection with North-Western Highway, today Mitchell Highway, at Orange) and Main Road No. 230 from Lake Cargelligo via Euabalong to Condobolin, on the same day, 8 August 1928. With the passing of the Main Roads (Amendment) Act of 1929 to provide for additional declarations of State Highways and Trunk Roads, these were amended to Trunk Roads 56 and 61 and Main Road 230 on 8 April 1929.

The southern end of Trunk Road 56 was truncated at Bowning when the declaration of State Highway 15 (later named Barton Highway subsumed the former alignment on 19 February 1935; and the northern end was truncated to Forbes when the declaration of State Highway 17 (later named Newell Highway) subsumed the former alignment on 16 March 1938. Trunk Road 61 was re-aligned to run between Orange and Condobolin via Parkes on 6 April 1938; its former alignment between Condobolin and Forbes (and continuing east via Eugowra and Cudal to Orange) was replaced by Main Road 377. Main Road 501 was declared between Lake Cargelligo via Hillston to the intersection with State Highway 21 (later named Cobb Highway) in Booligal on 17 May 1939.

The route – from Booligal to Bowning, along Trunk Road 56 and Main Roads 230 and 377 and 501 – was named Lachlan Valley Way on 23 September 1970. Main Road 230 had its declaration revoked on 15 March 1996, but the road is still generally known as a part of Lachlan Valley Way despite this. Main Road 501 was divided into two sections between Hillston and Wallanthery, with Main Road 410 (Kidman Way) subsuming the former alignment and officially splitting Lachlan Valley Way into a western section terminating at Hillston, and an eastern section terminating in Wallanthery, on 12 March 2010.

The passing of the Roads Act of 1993 updated road classifications and the way they could be declared within New South Wales. Under this act, Lachlan Valley Way today retains its declaration as part of Main Road 377, and as Main Roads 56 and 501, from Booligal to Hillston, then from Wallanthery to Lake Cargelligo, then from Condoblin via Forbes, Cowra and Boorowa to Bowning.

Lachlan Valley Way was signed State Route 81 between Cowra and Bowning in 1974. With the conversion to the newer alphanumeric system in 2013, this was replaced with route B81.

== Major intersections ==
LGA	Location	km	mi	Destinations	Notes
Hay	Booligal	0.0	0.0	Cobb Highway (B75) – Ivanhoe, Wilcannia, Hay, Deniliquin	Western terminus of Lachlan Valley Way
Carrathool	Hillston	76.2	47.3	Kidman Way (B87 south) – Goolgowi, Griffith	T-intersection
Gap in route
Carrathool	Wallanthery	110.5	68.7	Kidman Way (B87 north) – Cobar	T-intersection
Lachlan	Lake Cargelligo	167.4	104.0	Canada Street (Condobolin–Lake Cargelligo Road) (south) – Condobolin; Foster Street (east) – Lake Cargelligo	4-way intersection
Lachlan River		179.3	111.4	Bridge over the river (bridge name unknown)	
Cobar	Euabalong	194.5	120.9	Lachlan Street (Tipping Way) – Euabalong West, Cobar	
Lachlan River		194.9	121.1	Bridge over the river (bridge name unknown)	
Lachlan	Euabalong	199.7	124.1	Condobolin–Lake Cargelligo Road – Lake Cargelligo	
Lachlan	Condobolin	259.8	161.4	Condobolin–West Wyalong Road (The Gipps Way south) – West Wyalong	
Lachlan	Condobolin	260.9	162.1	William Street (The Gipps Way north) – Condobolin, Parkes	T-intersection
Forbes	Bundaburrah	352.8	219.2	Newell Highway (A39 south) – West Wyalong	Western concurrency terminus with route A39 at T-intersection
Lachlan River		356.9	221.8	Bridge over the river (bridge name unknown)	
Lake Forbes		358.6	222.8	Oxley Bridge	
Forbes	Forbes	359.1	223.1	Newell Highway (A39 north) – Parkes	Eastern concurrency terminus with route A39 at T-intersection
Lake Forbes		359.4	223.3	Bridge over the river (bridge name unknown)	
Forbes	Forbes	359.8	223.6	Bridge Street (The Escort Way) (east) – Cudal, Orange; Flint Street (north) – Forbes	Roundabout
Lachlan River		361.3	224.5	Bridge over the river (bridge name unknown)	
Forbes	Forbes	363.9	226.1	Henry Lawson Way – Grenfell, Young	
Cowra	Gooloogong	410.4	255.0	Nanima Road (north) – Eugowra, Canowindra; Grenfell–Orange Road (south) – Grenfell	
Cowra	Cowra	443.2	275.4	Mid-Western Highway (B64 west) – Grenfell	Western concurrency terminus with route B64 at T-intersection
Cowra	Cowra	448.5	278.7	Olympic Highway (A41 south) – Young, Junee	Eastern concurrency terminus with route B64, western concurrency terminus with route A41
Cowra	Cowra	448.6	278.7	Mid-Western Highway (A41/B81 east) – Blayney, Bathurst, Molong	Eastern concurrency terminus with route A41 at T-intersection; Route B81 continues east along Mid-Western Highway
Hilltops	Boorowa	521.4	324.0	Murringo Gap Road – Murringo, Young	
Yass Valley	Bowning	567.9	352.9	Hume Freeway (M31) – Gundagai, Albury, Yass, Goulburn	Eastern terminus of Lachlan Valley Way, southern terminus of route B81
Concurrency terminus; Route transition

== See also ==
- Highways in Australia
- List of highways in New South Wales
