= Kidman Way =

Highway in New South Wales

Kidman Way New South Wales
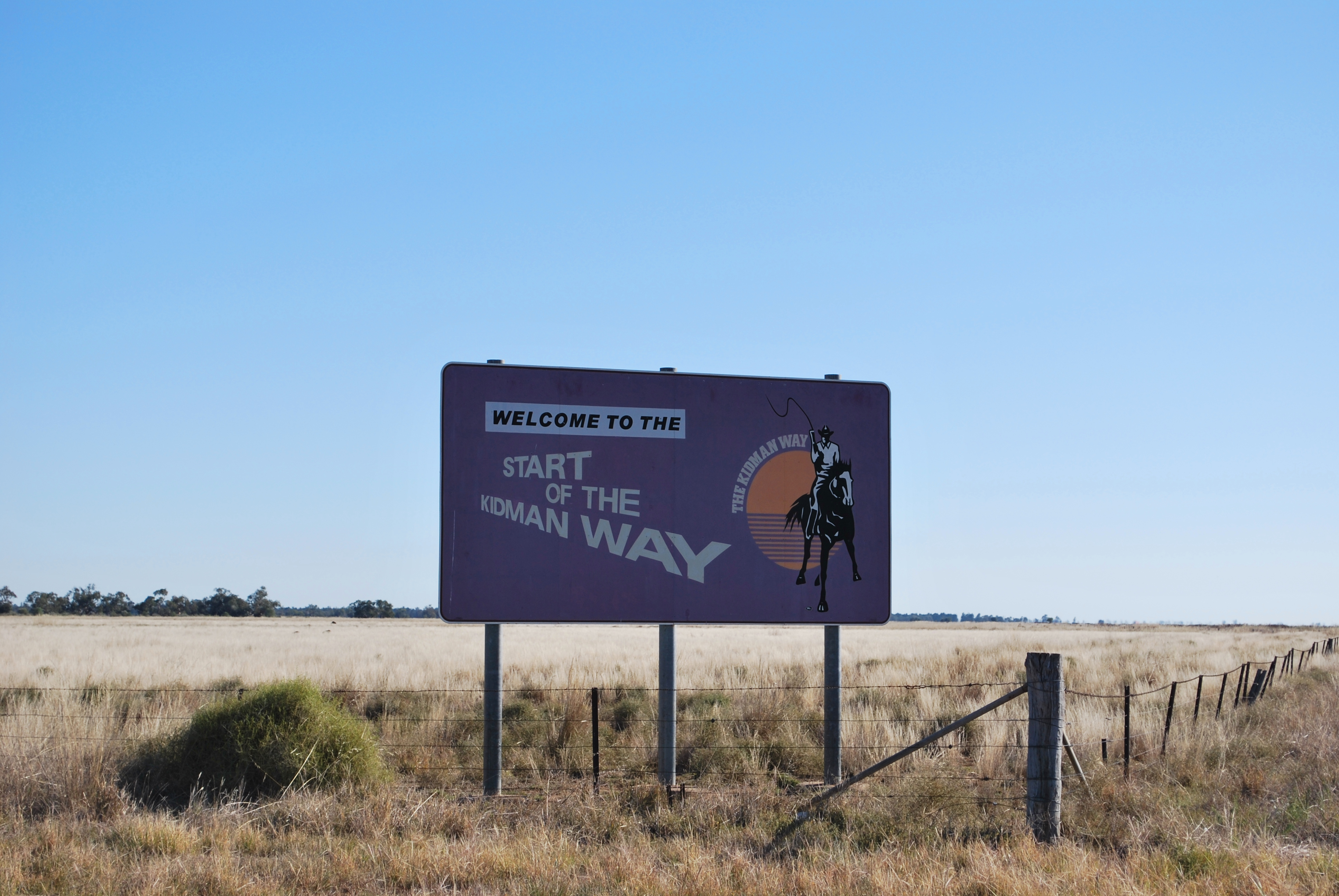
- Road sign north of Jerilderie at the southern terminus of Kidman Way
- Coordinates: 30.094079°S 145.936897°E (North end); 35.251587°S 145.806225°E (South end)

General information
- Type: Rural road
- Length: 643 km (400 mi)
- Gazetted: August 1928 (as Main Road 254); March 1938 (as Trunk Road 80)
- Route number(s): B87 (2013–present)
- Former route number: State Route 87 (1974–2013)

Major junctions
- North end: Mitchell Highway; Bourke, New South Wales
- Barrier Highway; Lachlan Valley Way; Mid-Western Highway; Irrigation Way; Sturt Highway
- South end: Newell Highway; Bundure, New South Wales

Location(s)
- Major settlements: Cobar, Mount Hope, Hillston, Goorawin, Goolgowi, Griffith, Darlington Point, Coleambally

Kidman Way is a state rural road in the western Riverina and western region of New South Wales, Australia. The 643-kilometre (400 mi) highway services the Murrumbidgee Irrigation Area and outback communities and links the Newell Highway with the Sturt, Mid-Western, Barrier, Mitchell and Kamilaroi highways. The road is designated route B87 for its entire length, with its northern terminus at Bourke and its southern terminus just north of Jerilderie. Kidman Way is fully sealed and is accessible by two or four-wheel drive.

Kidman Way draws its history from the stock routes that linked cattle stations in the region, many of which were owned by Sir Sidney Kidman, an Australian pastoralist and philanthropist.

== Route ==
Kidman Way runs generally north–south, roughly aligned to the state border between New South Wales and South Australia, approximately 140 kilometres (87 mi) west of the geographic centre of New South Wales.

The southern junction of Kidman Way is located at a road junction with Newell Highway, located 16 kilometres (10 mi) north of Jerilderie. From this point Kidman Way heads north, its only major intersection being with Sturt Highway at Waddi, as it moves north through the lush Riverina area towards the city of Griffith, passing through the small towns of Coleambally and Darlington Point. Here Kidman Way crosses the Murrumbidgee River. Griffith is a large regional centre, in the heart of the Murrumbidgee Irrigation Area, surrounded by vineyards, orchards and ricefields.

From Griffith, Kidman Way heads north through the vast, open western plains. This is where the outback begins, with plenty of kangaroos and emus and giant tumbleweeds roll across the roads. The first 100 kilometres (60 mi) or more from that point are still fairly green passing through towns such as Goolgowi where a roundabout marks its junction with Mid-Western Highway; as it continues north to Merriwagga and Hillston, then heading north to Cobar via long, straight, unbroken stretches of road, except for the village of Mount Hope; this section of road has no fuel services. Kidman Way continues 160 kilometres (100 mi) through mallee and semi-arid woodlands on to Cobar, once famous for copper, where it meets Barrier Highway, running east–west. From there the road leads to Bourke, where it meets Mitchell Highway at its northern terminus, and connects to Kamilaroi Highway.

Additional stock routes, not officially designated as part of Kidman Way, provide access to south western and central western Queensland and ultimately, via various roads, to Normanton on the Gulf of Carpentaria.

== History ==
The passing of the Main Roads Act of 1924 through the Parliament of New South Wales provided for the declaration of Main Roads, roads partially funded by the State government through the Main Roads Board (later the Department of Main Roads, and eventually Transport for NSW). Main Road No. 254 was declared from Hillston to Griffith, and Main Road No. 257 was declared from Hillston via Cobar to Bourke, declared on the same day, 8 August 1928. With the passing of the Main Roads (Amendment) Act of 1929 to provide for additional declarations of State Highways and Trunk Roads, these were amended to Main Roads 254 and 257 on 8 April 1929.

The southern end of Main Road 254 was extended from Griffith via Leeton, Yanco and Narrandera to the intersection with Trunk Road 58 (later Sturt Highway) at Gillenbah, and Main Road 321 was declared from the intersection with Main Road 254 in Griffith via Darlington Point to the intersection with Trunk Road 58 in Waddi, on the same day, 5 December 1929.

The Department of Main Roads, which had succeeded the MRB in 1932, extended the northern end of Main Road 321 from Griffith via Beelbangera to the intersection with Mid-Western Highway west of Rankins Springs on 23 January 1934, then extended the southern end of Main Road 321 from Waddi to the intersection with Main Road 229 (later Newell Highway) 10 miles north of Jerilderie on 11 December 1934. The northern end of Main Road 254 was extended from Hillston via Cobar to Bourke, subsuming Main Road 257, also on 11 December 1934. Trunk Road 80 was declared on 16 March 1938, from Hillston to Griffith (and continuing eastwards via Leeton to the intersection with State Highway 17, later Newell Highway, in Narrendera, and continuing westwards to Mossgiel), subsuming the alignment of Main Road 254 between Narrandera and Hillston; Main Road 254 was re-declared from Yenda to the intersection with Trunk Road 80 at Wumbulgal, and the declaration between Hillston to Bourke was removed, partially restored when Trunk Road 61 was declared from Cobar to The Priory (32km west of Nymagee, and continuing east via Nymagee, Condobolin, Parkes and Boree to Orange) less than a month later on 6 April 1938. Main Road 501 was declared from Wallanthery to Hillston (and continuing west to the intersection with State Highway 21, later Cobb Highway, in Booligal, and continuing east to Lake Cargelligo) on 17 May 1939.

Main Road 410 was declared from Wallanthery via Mount Hope to the intersection of Trunk Road 61 at The Priory, and Main Road 421 was declared from Cobar to Bourke, both on 17 June 1959. Main Road 410 was finally extended at its northern end from The Priory to terminate at the intersection with Barrier Highway at Cobar (subsuming the former alignment of Trunk Road 61, which was truncated to terminate at Condobolin and replaced with Main Road 461), and at its southern end from Wallanthery to Hillston (subsuming the former alignment of Main Road 501, which was divided into a western section terminating at Hillston, and an eastern section terminating in Wallanthery), and the route was also officially named as Kidman Way, on 12 March 2010.

The passing of the Roads Act of 1993 updated road classifications and the way they could be declared within New South Wales. Under this act, Kidman Way today retains its declarations as parts of Main Roads 80 and 321, and as Main Roads 410 and 421.

The route was allocated State Route 87 in 1974 between Hillston and Bundure, and was extended north to Cobar in 2001 once the road north of Hillston was fully sealed. With the conversion to the newer alphanumeric system in 2013, this was replaced with route B87.

== Major intersections ==
LGA	Location	km	mi	Destinations	Notes
Bourke	Bourke	0	0.0	Mitchell Highway (B71) – Nyngan, Cunnamulla, Charleville to Kamilaroi Highway (B76) – Walgett, Moree	Northern terminus of Kidman Way and route B87 at 4-way intersection
Cobar	Cobar	160	99	Barrier Highway (A32 west) – Wilcannia, Broken Hill, Adelaide	Concurrency with Barrier Highway
Cobar	Cobar	161	100	Barrier Highway (A32 east) – Nyngan	Concurrency with Barrier Highway
Cobar	Mount Hope	322	200	Tipping Way – Euabalong, Condobolin	
Lachlan River		379	235	Bridge over the river (Bridge name not known)	
Carrathool	Wallanthery	381	237	Lachlan Valley Way (east) – Lake Cargelligo	
Carrathool	Hillston	415	258	High Street, to Lachlan Valley Way (west) – Booligal	T-intersection
Carrathool	Hillston	416	258	Rankins Springs Road – Rankins Springs	
Carrathool	Goolgowi	476	296	Mid-Western Highway (B64) – West Wyalong, Cowra, Bathurst, Hay	Roundabout
Griffith	Griffith	526	327	Banna Avenue (Irrigation Way) (B94) – Leeton, Yanco, Narrandera to Burley Griffin Way (B94) – Yenda, Temora, Bowning	Roundabout
Murrumbidgee	Darlington Point	559	347	Narrand Street, to Darlington Point–Whitton Road – Whitton, Leeton	T-intersection
Murrumbidgee River		560	350	Darlington Point Bridge	
Murrumbidgee	Waddi	563	350	Sturt Highway (A20 west) – Hay, Mildura, Adelaide	Concurrency with Sturt Highway
Murrumbidgee	Waddi	564	350	Sturt Highway (A20 east) – Narrandera, Wagga Wagga	Concurrency with Sturt Highway
Jerilderie	Bundure Junction	643	400	Newell Highway (A39) – Jerilderie, Tocumwal, Narrandera, Dubbo	Southern terminus of Kidman Way and route B87
1.000 mi = 1.609 km; 1.000 km = 0.621 mi: Concurrency terminus; Route transition

== Gallery ==
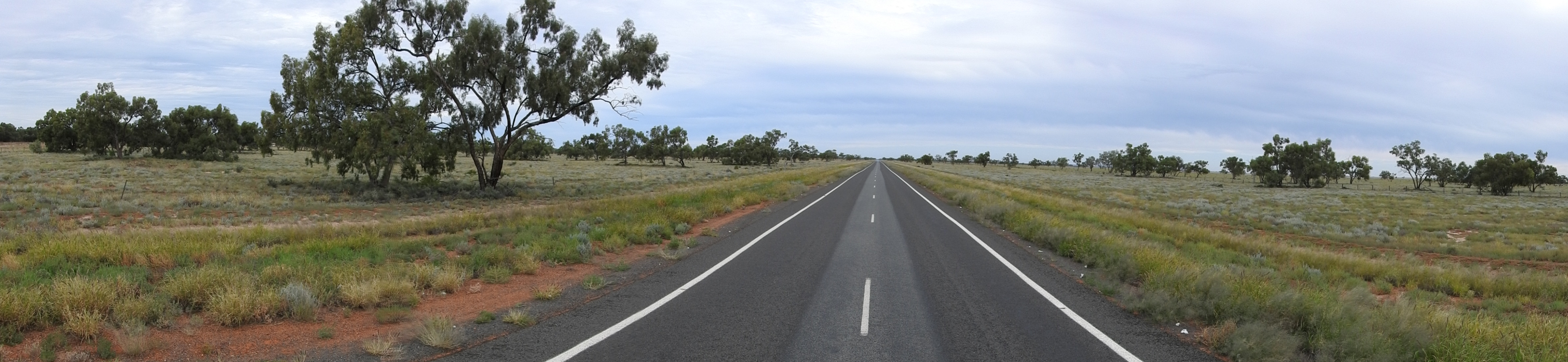
Kidman Way south of Bourke (panorama) (2021).
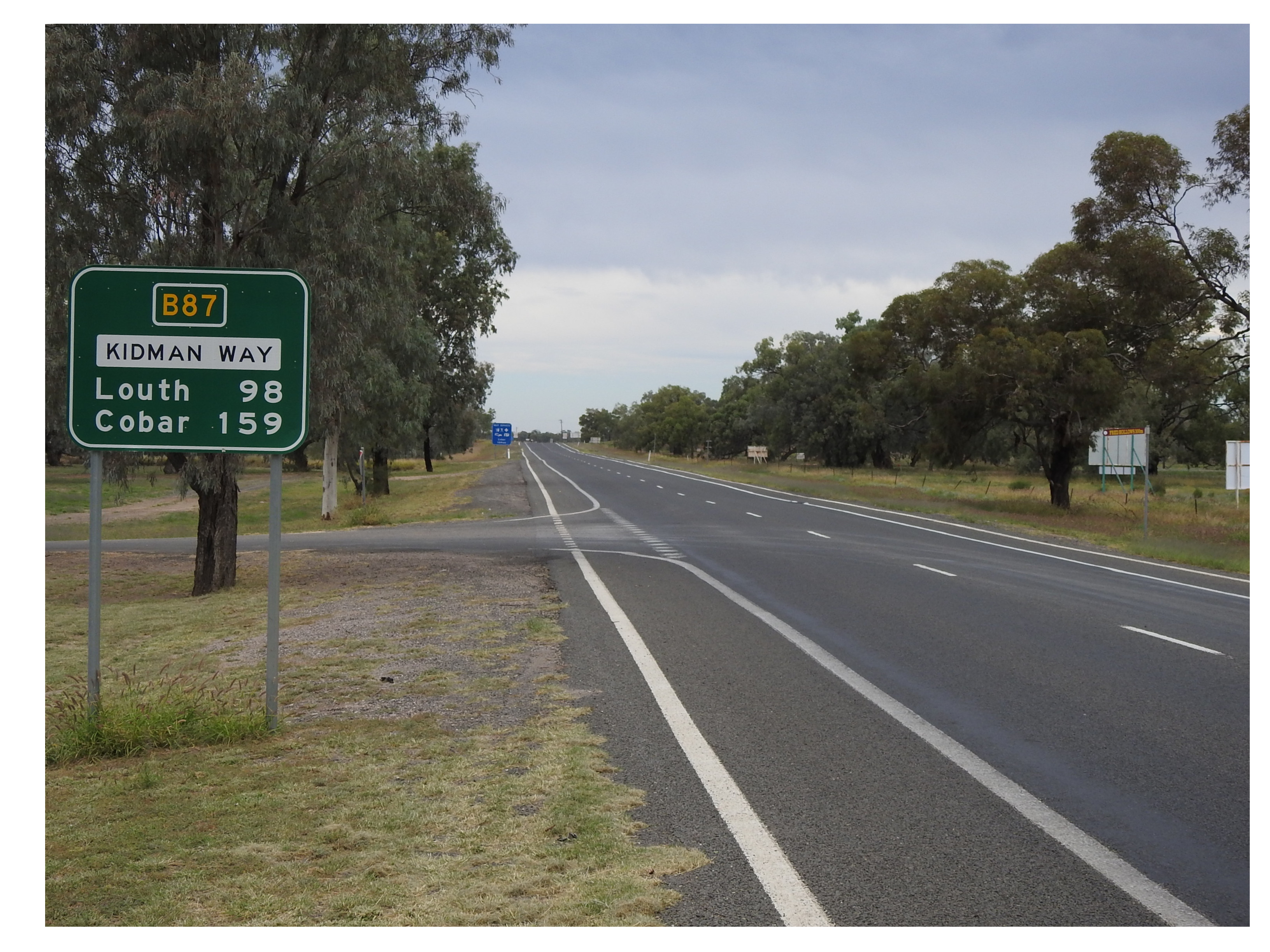
Kidman Way sign to Louth, as leaving Bourke (2021).

== See also ==
- Highways in Australia
- Highways in New South Wales
