= The Harden-Murrumburrah Express =

Weekly newspaper in New South Wales, Australia

The Harden-Murrumburrah Express or The Harden Murrumburrah Express is a formerly printed newspaper now existing only online and containing little or no news of direct relevance to the community of Harden, New South Wales, Australia.

There are now no local Express employees generating content related to the town.

The Express in its former form started in 1947. The State Library NSW holds a microform of the newspaper beginning in 1947. The Express served the regional towns of Harden, Murrumburrah, Wallendbeen and Wombat.

== History ==
In January 1947 Harden Express and Murrumburrah Signal and County of Harden Advocate amalgamated to form Harden-Murrumburrah Express. Harden Murrumburrah Express was sold to Rural Press Limited or RPL on 28 September 1990, previously being owned by J.A. Bradley (Holdings) Limited.

== See also ==
- List of newspapers in Australia
- List of newspapers in New South Wales
