= Murrumburrah Signal and County of Harden Advocate =

The Murrumburrah Signal and County of Harden Advocate, also known as the Murrumburrah Signal and The Signal, Murrumburrah-Harden, was an English language newspaper published from 1881 to 1947 in Murrumburrah, New South Wales, Australia.

Front page of the Murrumburrah Signal and County of Harden Advocate, 6 August 1881

== History ==
The Murrumburrah Signal and County of Harden Advocate was first published on 6 August 1881 by proprietors P. Jefferson Wallace and Robert Bruce Wallace. Initially it was published every Saturday and circulated in Murrumburrah and the surrounding districts. From 14 November 1946 the title changed to The Signal, Murrumburrah-Harden. The paper ceased publication on 9 January 1947 when it was merged with the Harden Express to form The Harden-Murrumburrah Express.

== Digitisation ==
The Murrumburrah Signal and County of Harden Advocate has been digitised as part of the Australian Newspapers Digitisation Program of the National Library of Australia.

== See also ==
- List of newspapers in New South Wales
- List of newspapers in Australia
