= Newell Highway =

Highway in New South Wales, Australia

Newell Highway New South Wales

General information
- Type: Highway
- Length: 1,058 km (657 mi)
- Gazetted: August 1928 (as Main Roads 56 and 229); March 1938 (as State Highway 17)
- Route number(s): A39 (2013–present) Goondiwindi–NSW/VIC border); Concurrencies: B64 (2013–present) (Marsden–West Wyalong); B94 (2013–present) (Mirrool–Ardlethan)
- Former route number: National Highway 39 (1992–2005/2013); National Route 39 (1962–1992)

Major junctions
- North end: Leichhardt Highway; Cunningham Highway Goondiwindi, Queensland
- Barwon Highway; Gwydir Highway; Kamilaroi Highway; Oxley Highway; Castlereagh Highway; Oxley Highway; Golden Highway; Mitchell Highway; Mid-Western Highway; Goldfields Way; Burley Griffin Way; Sturt Highway; Kidman Way; Riverina Highway
- South end: Goulburn Valley Highway; NSW/VIC border

Location(s)
- Major settlements: Moree, Narrabri, Coonabarabran, Gilgandra, Dubbo, Parkes, Forbes, West Wyalong, Tocumwal

Highway system
- Highways in Australia; National Highway • Freeways in Australia; Highways in New South Wales

The Newell Highway is a national highway in New South Wales (NSW), Australia. It provides the major road link between south-eastern Queensland and Victoria, via central NSW and, as such, carries a large amount of freight. At 1,058 kilometres (657 mi) in length, the Newell is the longest highway in NSW, and passes through fifteen local government areas.

The highway is named in honour of H. H. Newell, the first Commissioner for Main Roads in New South Wales (1932–1941). It is designated route A39 for its entire length.

== Route ==
From its northern terminus at Goondiwindi in Queensland, where it meets the Cunningham and Leichhardt Highways, and forms the southward extension of Cunningham Highway from Warwick and Brisbane, the Newell runs south across the Queensland-New South Wales border through Boggabilla, Moree, Narrabri, Coonabarabran, Gilgandra, Dubbo, Parkes, Forbes, West Wyalong, Narrandera, Jerilderie, and Finley. Its southern terminus is where it crosses the Murray River (part of the border between New South Wales and Victoria) at Tocumwal and becomes Goulburn Valley Highway in Victoria, to eventually join Hume Highway at Seymour. The Newell Highway runs generally north–south, parallel to the coast of NSW but about 350 kilometres (220 mi) inland, and is the most direct road link from Victoria to southeastern Queensland, bypassing the more urbanised and congested coastal areas of the state, and in doing so avoiding the difficult coastal topography of the New South Wales North Coast, traversed by Pacific Highway.

The terrain that the highway traverses is generally flat to gently undulating, with long, straight sections joined by the occasional curved section. However, passing through the Warrumbungle Range, there are steeper grades and tighter curves than on the rest of the highway.

The Newell intersects the following highways: Bruxner (at Boggabilla), Carnarvon and Gwydir (at Moree), Kamilaroi (at Narrabri), Oxley (east) (north of Coonabarabran), Castlereagh and Oxley (west) (at Gilgandra), Golden and Mitchell (at Dubbo), Mid-Western (east) at Marsden), Mid-Western (west) at West Wyalong), Sturt (at Gillenbah) and Riverina (at Finley).

Newell Highway is located entirely west of the Great Dividing Range, running largely along the foot of the western slopes of the range, and as such crosses nine major rivers, all west-flowing from the Great Dividing Range. From north to south these rivers are the Macintyre (at Goondiwindi), the Gwydir (10 km north of Moree), the Mehi (at Moree), the Namoi (near Narrabri), the Castlereagh (at Coonabarabran and again at Gilgandra), the Macquarie (at Dubbo), the Lachlan (at Forbes), the Murrumbidgee (at Narrandera), and the Murray (at Tocumwal). Some sections of the Newell Highway are subject to periodic flooding from these rivers, particularly north of Moree, at Dubbo, and south of Narrandera.

Other than short four-lane lengths within some of the urban areas through which it passes, Newell Highway is a single carriageway, two-lane road, although there are many overtaking lanes, with further overtaking lanes under construction for the next four years from 2021.

Traffic volumes along Newell Highway vary from around 1,200 to 4,000 vehicles per day in rural areas. In Dubbo, the largest urban centre through which the highway passes, average daily traffic volumes are in the order of 20,000 vehicles a day. Many heavy vehicles use the Newell Highway – between 26 per cent and 52 per cent of all traffic, depending on the point along the highway. At one point in the Riverina region of NSW, the highway carries approximately 1,900 vehicles daily, of which about 32 per cent is heavy vehicles; while at another point in the north of the state, which carries the largest number of heavy vehicles, on average a truck passes every 60 seconds, 24 hours a day, 7 days a week. The speed limit on most rural sections of the highway is 110 km/h (68 mph), with the exception of the rural section between Tooraweenah and Coonabarabran having a speed limit of 100km/h (62 mph) due to its mountainous topography.

== History ==
Before its declaration, Newell Highway existed as a collection of unrelated roads, many gazetted as separate entities. The passing of the Main Roads Act of 1924 through the Parliament of New South Wales provided for the declaration of Main Roads, roads partially funded by the State government through the Main Roads Board (later Transport for NSW). Main Road No. 6 was declared as part of Mid-Western Highway from West Wyalong and Marsden, Main Road No. 11 was declared as part of Oxley Highway from Gilgandra to Coonabarabran, Main Road No. 56 was declared from Gilgandra, Dubbo, Parkes and Forbes (and continuing northwards via Coonamble eventually to Walgett, and southwards via Cowra, Yass and Canberra eventually to the intersection with Queanbeyan-Braidwood Road, today Kings Highway, at Queanbeyan), Main Road No. 63 was declared from Boggabilla to the state border with Queensland at Goondiwindi (and continuing southwards via Yetman to Warialda and Bingara to the intersection with Great Northern Highway, today New England Highway, at Tamworth), Main Road No. 126 was declared from Boggabilla via Moree and Bellata to Narrabri (and continuing southeast via Boggabri and Gunnedah to Qurindi), Main Road No. 229 was declared from Wagga-Hay Road (today Sturt Highway) in Narrandera, via Jerilderie and Finley to the state border with Victoria at Tocumwal, Main Road No. 235 was declared from Forbes to Marsden (and continuing southwards via Morangarell and Stockinbingal to Cootamundra), and Main Road No. 243 was declared from Narranderra to Grong Grong (and continuing eastwards via Coolamon, Cootamundra and Harden to Bowning). With the passing of the Main Roads (Amendment) Act of 1929 to provide for additional declarations of State Highways and Trunk Roads, these were amended to State Highways 6 and 11, Trunk Roads 56 and 63 and Main Roads 126 and 229 and 235 and 243 on 8 April 1929.

The Department of Main Roads, which had succeeded the MRB in 1932, later declared Trunk Road 72 from the intersection with State Highway 12 (Gwydir Highway) in Moree via Bellata to Narrabri (and continuing southeast via Boggabri to Gunnedah) and Main Road 338 from Moree to Boggabilla, on 18 July 1933; the northern end of Main Road 126 was truncated to meet State Highway 11 (Oxley Highway) at Gunnedah. State Highway 17 was declared on 16 March 1938, from the intersection with State Highway 16 (later known as Bruxner Highway) at Boggabilla (which subsumed Trunk Road 63, declared on the same day) to the intersection with Gwydir Highway at Moree (subsuming Main Road 338), then from Moree via Narrabri to the intersection with Oxley Highway near Coonabarabran, then from Gilgandra via Dubbo, Parks and Forbes to the intersection with Mid-Western Highway at Marsden, then from West Wyalong via Ardlethan to the intersection with Sturt Highway at Narrendera, then from Narrandera, Jerilderie and Finley to the state border with Victoria at Tocumwal, subsuming Main Road 229; the northern ends of Trunk Roads 56 and 72 were truncated to meet State Highway 17 at Forbes and Narrabri respectively, Main Road 235 was truncated to meet State Highway 17 at Marsden, and Main Road 243 was truncated to meet State Highway 17 at Grong Grong, as a result. State Highway 17 was named Newell Highway on 2 July 1941, in honour of H. H. Newell, Commissioner for Main Roads 1932–41, following his death in office.

At the time of the gazettal of State Highway 17, it followed existing roads as far as possible, but between Coonabarabran and Narrabri and between Narrandera and West Wyalong no road existed. The section through the Pilliga Scrub between Coonabarabran and Narrabri was constructed during 1941–42 as a wartime defence project, and the section between Narrandera and West Wyalong was constructed in 1946–49. In 1952 the ultimate gazetted route of the highway between Narrandera and West Wyalong was altered from its original 1938 gazetted route.

Some sections of Newell Highway run concurrent along other highways. From north to south these are the Gwydir at Moree, the Kamilaroi at Narrabri, the Oxley (from 10 km north of Coonabarabran to Gilgandra), the Castlereagh through Gilgandra, the Mid-Western between Marsden and West Wyalong, and the Riverina (185 m through Finley). Previously, the declaration of Newell Highway was discontinuous, breaking where it shared concurrencies with these highways. As a consequence of its declaration as a National Highway in 1992, to simplify funding and administrative purposes, it was redeclared to form one continuous highway on 15 January 1993, breaking other highway declarations it shares concurrencies with.

The passing of the Roads Act of 1993 through the Parliament of New South Wales updated road classifications and the way they could be declared within New South Wales. Under this act, Newell Highway today retains its declaration as Highway 17, from the state border with Queensland at Goondiwindi to the state border Victoria at Tocumwall.

Newell Highway was signed National Route 39 across its entire length in 1965. The Whitlam government introduced the federal National Roads Act 1974, where roads declared as a National Highway were still the responsibility of the states for road construction and maintenance, but were fully compensated by the Federal government for money spent on approved projects. As an important interstate link between the capitals of Queensland and Victoria, Newell Highway was declared a National Highway in 1992, and was consequently re-allocated National Highway 39. With both states' conversion to the newer alphanumeric system between 2005 and 2013, its route number was updated to route A39 for the highway within Queensland in 2005, and eventually within New South Wales in 2013.

Completion of the sealing of the full length of the highway occurred in 1972.

Town centre bypasses have been provided in Moree, Dubbo, Parkes and West Wyalong (heavy vehicle route). A town bypass at Ardlethan has also been constructed.

== Major intersections ==
State	LGA	Location	km	mi	Destinations	Notes
Queensland	Goondiwindi	Goondiwindi	0	0.0	Cunningham Highway (National Highway A39 north) – Warwick, Brisbane to Leichhardt Highway (National Highway A39, A5) – Toowoomba, Miles, Rockhampton	Northern terminus of highway at roundabout National Highway A39 continues north along Cunningham Highway
Queensland	Goondiwindi	Goondiwindi	0	0.0	Marshall Street (west), to Barwon Highway (State Route 85) – Goondiwindi, St George; Kildonan Road (Tourist Route 3 east) – Yelarbon, Border Rivers Tourist Drive	
Queensland	Goondiwindi	Goondiwindi	1	0.62	Newell Highway (National Highway A39)	Southern terminus of National Highway A39
State border			1	0.62	Queensland – New South Wales state border	
New South Wales	Macintyre River		1	0.62	Bridge over river	
New South Wales	Moree Plains	Boggabilla	1	0.62	Newell Highway (A39)	Northern terminus of route A39
New South Wales	Moree Plains	Boggabilla	8	5.0	Bruxner Way – Yetman, Tenterfield, Northern Rivers coast	
New South Wales	Gwydir River		122	76	Bridge over river	
New South Wales	Moree Plains	Moree	131	81	Boggabilla Road (Gwydir Highway) (B76 west) – Collarenebri	Route B76 western concurrency terminus
New South Wales	Mehi River		133	83	Bridge over river	
New South Wales	Moree Plains	Moree	133	83	Alice Street (Gwydir Highway) (B76 east) – Warialda	Route B76 eastern concurrency terminus
New South Wales	Narrabri	Narrabri	232	144	Kamilaroi Highway (west) – Wee Waa, Walgett	
New South Wales	Namoi River		235	146	Bridge over river	
New South Wales	Narrabri	Narrabri	236	147	Kamilaroi Highway (B51 east) – Boggabri, Gunnedah	Roundabout
New South Wales	Warrumbungle	Coonabarabran	348	216	Oxley Highway (B56 east) – Gunnedah	
New South Wales	Gilgandra	Tooraweenah	407	253	Tooraweenah–Mendooran Road – Tooraweenah	
New South Wales	Gilgandra	Gilgandra	441	274	Castlereagh Highway (B55 east) – Mendooran, Dunedoo	Route B55 eastern concurrency terminus
New South Wales	Castlereagh River		442	275	Jack Renshaw Bridge	
New South Wales	Gilgandra	Gilgandra	442	275	Castlereagh Highway (B55 west), to Oxley Highway (west) – Coonamble, Warren	Route B55 western concurrency terminus
New South Wales	Talbragar River		501	311	Bridge over river	
New South Wales	Dubbo	Dubbo	506	314	Erskine Street, to Golden Highway (B84) – Dunedoo, Muswellbrook	T-intersection
New South Wales	Macquarie River		507	315	Emile Serisier Bridge; Aunty Pearl Gibbs Bridge	
New South Wales	Dubbo	Dubbo	508	316	Mitchell Highway (A32) – Wellington, Narromine	
New South Wales	Narromine	Tomingley	559	347	Tomingley–Narromine Road – Narromine	
New South Wales	Parkes	Parkes	626	389	Dalton Street (Henry Parkes Way) (west) – Condobolin	
New South Wales	Parkes	Parkes	627	390	Grenfell Street (Henry Parkes Way) (east) – Orange	
New South Wales	Forbes	Forbes	659	409	Camp Street, to Lachlan Valley Way (east) – Cowra, and to Henry Lawson Way – Grenfell)	Lachlan Valley Way northern concurrency terminus
New South Wales	Lake Forbes		660	410	Oxley Bridge	
New South Wales	Lachlan River		661	411	Bridge over river	
New South Wales	Forbes	Bundaburrah	665	413	Lachlan Valley Way (west) – Condobolin	Lachlan Valley Way southern concurrency terminus
New South Wales	Bland	Marsden	726	451	Mid-Western Highway (B64 east) – Grenfell	Route B64 eastern concurrency terminus
New South Wales	Bland	Wyalong	758	471	Barmedman Road (Goldfields Way) (B85) – Temora	
New South Wales	Bland	West Wyalong	763	474	Mid-Western Highway (B64 west) – Hay	Route B64 western concurrency terminus
New South Wales	Coolamon	Mirrool Junction	813	505	Burley Griffin Way (B94 east) – Temora	Concurrency with route B94
New South Wales	Coolamon	Ardlethan	831	516	Burley Griffin Way (B94 west) – Griffith	Concurrency with route B94
New South Wales	Narrandera	Grong Grong	876	544	Ganmain Road – Coolamon	
New South Wales	Narrandera	Narrandera	898	558	Irrigation Way – Griffith	
New South Wales	Irrigation Canal		898	558	Bridge over the canal	
New South Wales	Murrumbidgee River		899	559	Narrandera Bridge	
New South Wales	Narrandera	Gillenbah	900	560	Sturt Highway (A20 southeast) – Wagga Wagga	Concurrency with route A20
New South Wales	Narrandera	Gillenbah	901	560	Sturt Highway (A20 northwest) – Darlington Point, Hay, Mildura	Concurrency with route A20
New South Wales	Jerilderie	Jerilderie Junction	991	616	Kidman Way – Griffith	
New South Wales	Billabong Creek		1,005	624	Bridge over creek	
New South Wales	Jerilderie	Jerilderie	1,007	626	Conargo Road – Conargo	
New South Wales	Berrigan	Finley	1,042	647	Tuppal Street (Riverina Highway) (B58 west) – Deniliquin	Concurrency with route B58
New South Wales	Berrigan	Finley	1,042.5	647.8	Berrigan Road (Riverina Highway) (B58 east) – Berrigan, Albury	Concurrency with route B58
New South Wales	Berrigan	Tocumwal	1,057	657	Newell Highway (A39)	Southern terminus of Newell Highway
New South Wales	Murray River		1,057	657	Edward Hillson Bridge	
State border			1,058	657	New South Wales – Victoria state border	
Victoria	Moira	Koonoomoo	1,058	657	Goulburn Valley Highway (A39) – Shepparton, Seymour	Northern terminus of Gouldburn Valley Highway, route A39 continues south
1.000 mi = 1.609 km; 1.000 km = 0.621 mi: Concurrency terminus; Route transition

== Gallery ==
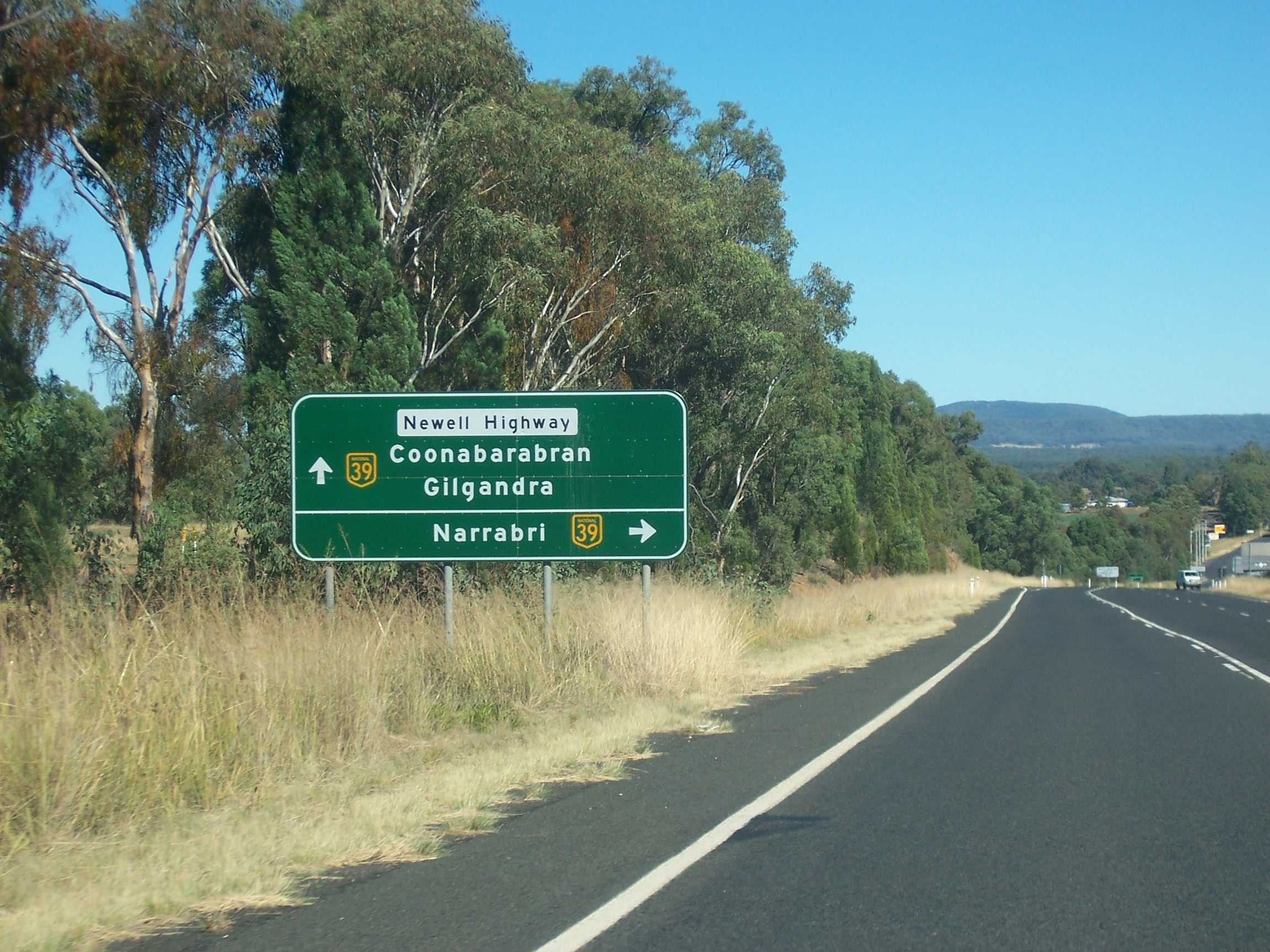
Oxley Highway looking towards the Junction of Newell and Oxley Highways, just east of Coonabarabran, looking south-west.

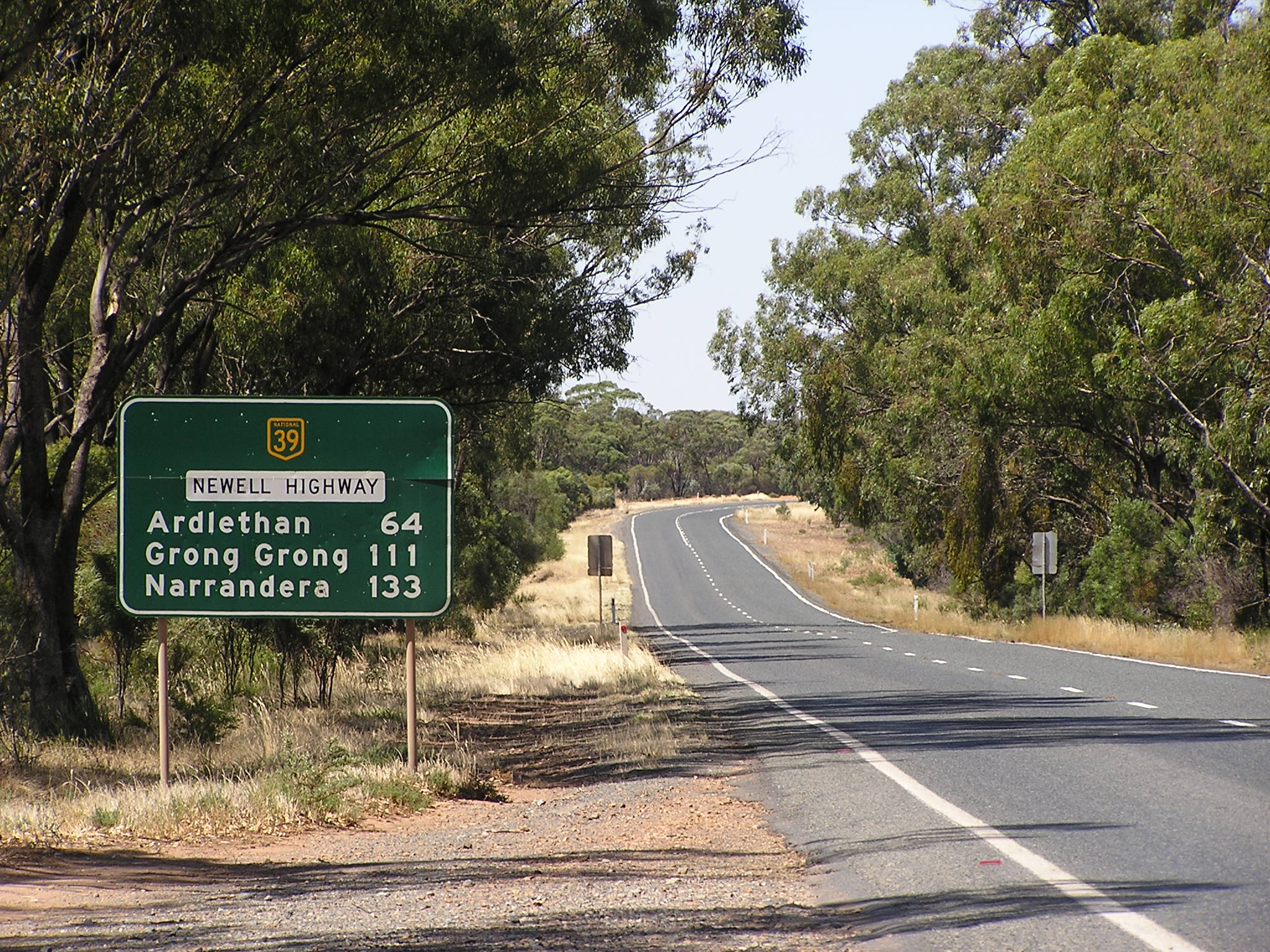
National Route 39, the Newell Highway, in New South Wales, just south of West Wyalong, looking south.

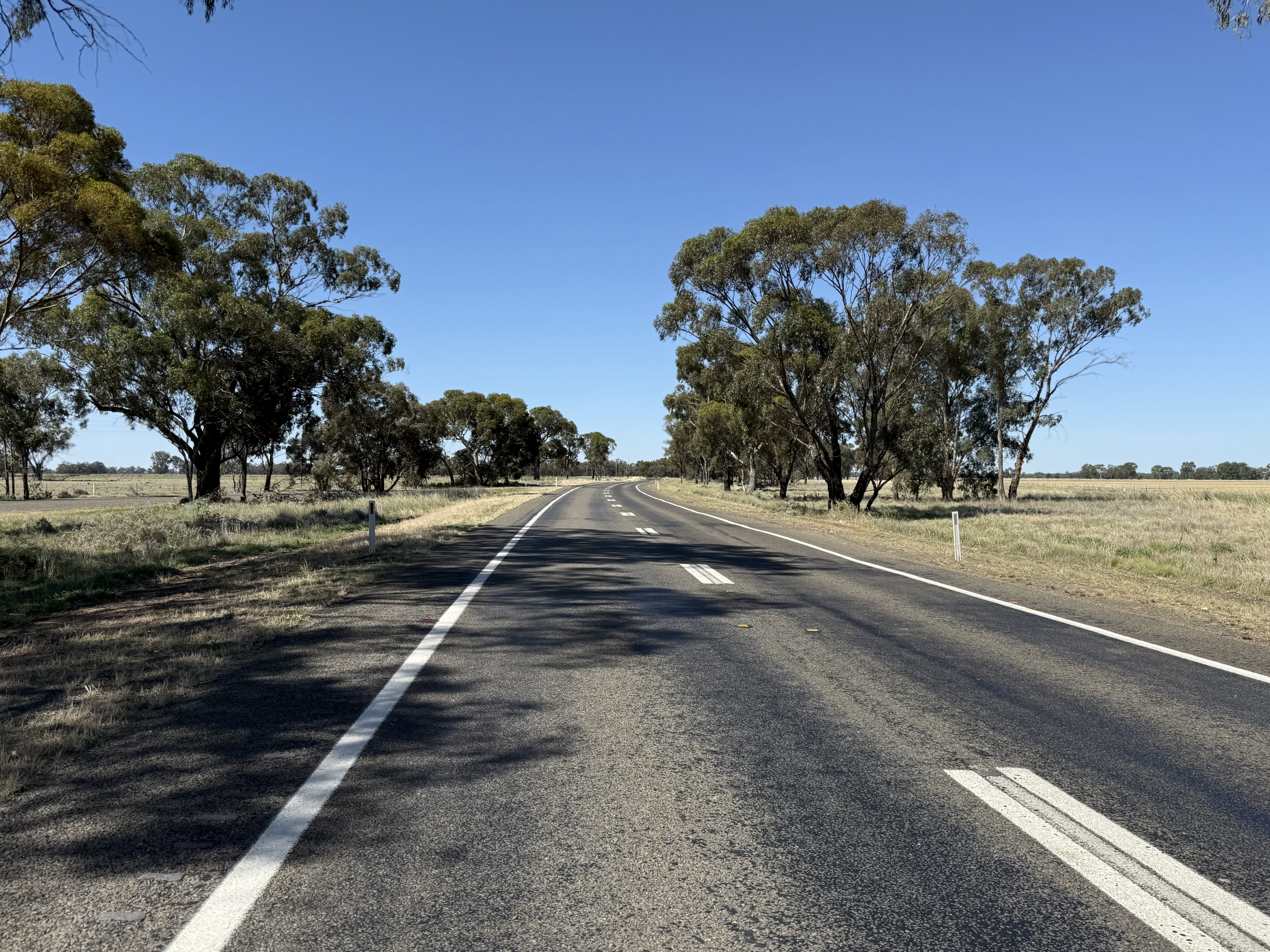
A northbound view of the Newell Highway between Finley and Jerilderie

== See also ==
- Highways in Australia
- List of highways in New South Wales
- List of highways in Queensland
- Bland Creek Bridge
