= Kamilaroi Highway =

Highway in New South Wales

Kamilaroi Highway New South Wales
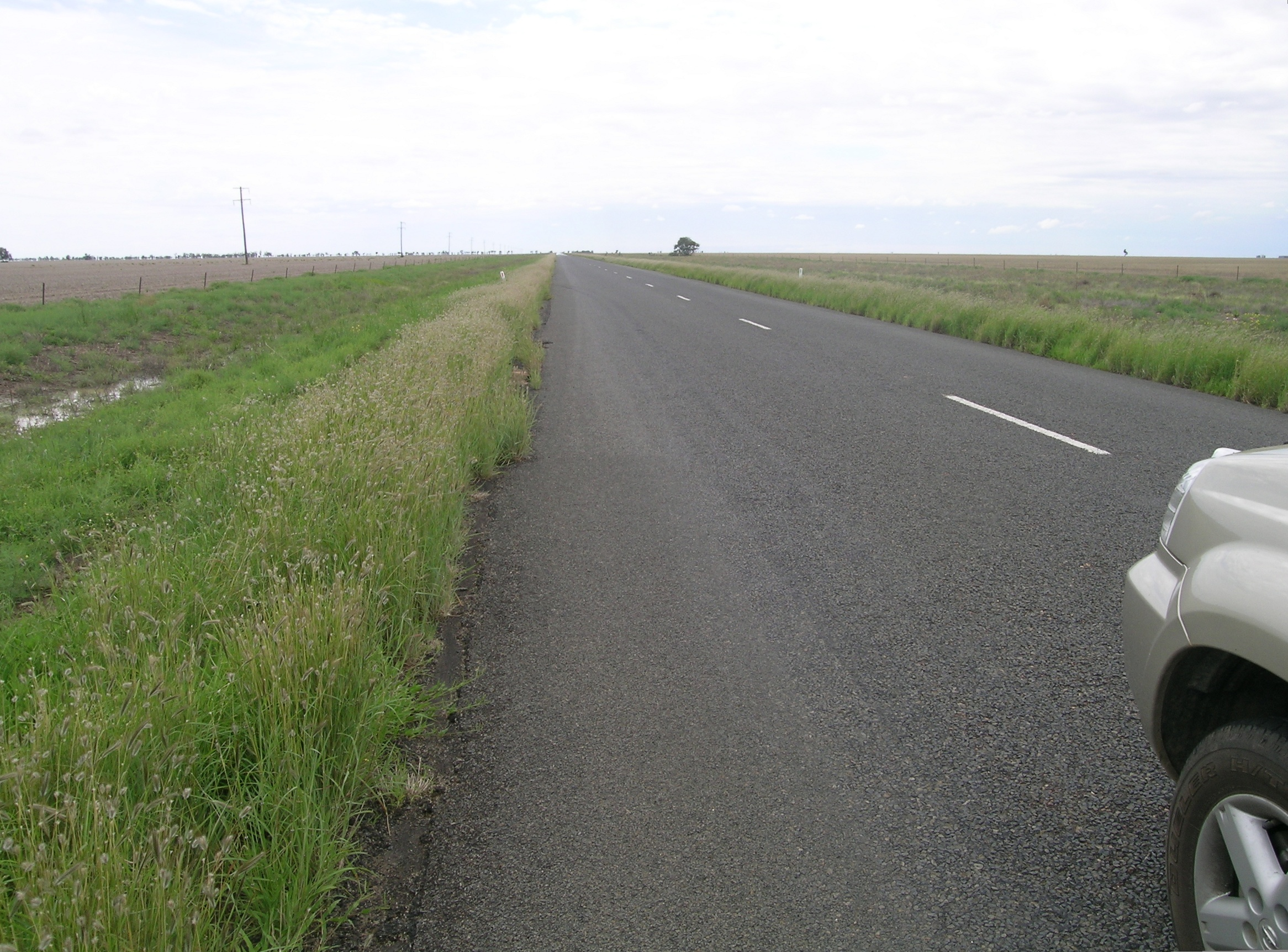
- A small mirage on Kamilaroi Highway near Cryon

General information
- Type: Highway
- Length: 605 km (376 mi)
- Gazetted: August 1928 (as Main Road 127); July 1933 (as Trunk Rad 72); February 1999 (as State Highway 29)
- Route number(s): B51 (2013–present) (Narrabri–Willow Tree); B76 (2013–present) (Bourke–Walgett); Concurrencies: B55 (2013–present) (through Walgett); B56 (2013–present) (through Gunnedah)
- Former route number: National Route 37 (1974–2013); Entire route

Major junctions
- Northwest end: Mitchell Highway; Bourke, New South Wales
- Castlereagh Highway; Newell Highway; Oxley Highway
- Southeast end: New England Highway; Willow Tree, New South Wales

Location(s)
- Major settlements: Brewarrina, Walgett, Burren Junction, Wee Waa, Narrabri, Boggabri, Gunnedah, Quirindi

Highway system
- Highways in Australia; National Highway • Freeways in Australia; Highways in New South Wales

Kamilaroi Highway is a 605-kilometre (376 mi) state highway located in the north-western region of New South Wales, Australia, and links Bourke via Walgett and Narrabri to Willow Tree. The highway is named after the Kamilaroi Indigenous Australian people who live in the area.

== Route ==
The highway begins at the intersection with Mitchell Highway at Bourke, and heads in an easterly direction through Brewarrina and Walgett to meet Newell Highway in northern Narrabri. It recommences from the intersection with Newell Highway in southern Narrabri and continues in a south-easterly direction via Gunnedah and Quirindi to eventually terminate at the intersection with New England Highway just north of Willow Tree.

Approximately 5 kilometres (3 mi) north of Boggabri is a spectacular landmark called Gin's Leap, known in the days of Cobb and Co as "The Rock". It is said that a young Aboriginal girl, being pursued by white settlers on horseback, jumped to her death rather than be raped and shot like others in her family.

== History ==
The passing of the Main Roads Act of 1924 through the Parliament of New South Wales provided for the declaration of Main Roads, roads partially funded by the State government through the Main Roads Board (MRB, later Transport for NSW). Main Road No. 68 was declared from Bourke via Brewarrina to Walgett (and continuing northwards via Collarenabri and Mogil Mogil to the state border with Queensland, and westwards via Louth, Wilcannia, Menindee and Pooncarrie to Wentworth), Main Road No. 126 was declared from Quirindi via Gunnedah and Boggabri to Narrabri (and continuing northwards via Bellata and Moree to Boggabilla), and Main Road No. 127 was declared from Narrabri to Wee Waa (and continuing west via Pilliga to Walgett) on the same day, 8 August 1928. With the passing of the Main Roads (Amendment) Act of 1929 to provide for additional declarations of State Highways and Trunk Roads, these were amended to Trunk Road 68 and Main Roads 126 and 127 on 8 April 1929.

The Department of Main Roads, which had succeeded the MRB in 1932, later declared Trunk Road 72 from Narrabri via Boggabri to the intersection with State Highway 11 (Oxley Highway) in Gunnedah (and continuing north via Bellata to Moree) on 18 July 1933; the northern end of Main Road 126 was truncated to meet State Highway 11 at Gunnedah, but these declarations were altered only 3 months later, when the southern end of Trunk Road 72 was extended to terminate at the intersection with State Highway 9 (New England Highway) just north of Willow Tree, subsuming Main Road 126, on 17 October 1933; Main Road 126 was re-declared from the intersection with Trunk Road 72 in Quirindi to the intersection with State Highway 9 at Wallabadah. Main Road 343 was declared on 26 September 1933 between Wee Waa and Burren Junction. Trunk Road 72 was permanently truncated at Narrabri when State Highway 17 (later Newell Highway) was declared on 16 March 1938. Main Road 619 was declared on 16 August 1978 between Burren Junction and Walgett.

The passing of the Roads Act of 1993 through the Parliament of New South Wales updated road classifications and the way they could be declared within New South Wales. Under this act, Kamilaroi Highway was declared as State Highway 29 on 12 February 1999, from the intersection with New England Highway at Willow Tree to the intersection with Oxley Highway at Gunnedah, then from Gunnedah via Boggabri to the intersection with Newell Highway at Narrabri, then from Narrabri via Wee Waa to the intersection of Castlereagh Highway northeast of Walgett, then from Walgett via Brewarrina to the intersection with Mitchell Highway in Bourke, subsuming Trunk Road 72 and Main Roads 343 and 619; the eastern end of Trunk Road 68 was truncated to meet Mitchell Highway at Bourke, and the northern end of Main Road 127 was truncated to meet Kamilaroi Highway at Wee Waa. The highway today, as Highway 29, still retains this declaration.

Kamilaroi Highway was signed National Route 37 in 1974, between Willow Tree and Narrabri - later extended west to Bourke when the highway was declared in 1999 - but poorly signed west of Walgett. With the conversion to the newer alphanumeric system in 2013, this was replaced with route B51 between Willow Tree and Narrabri, unallocated between Narrabri and Walgett, and route B76 between Walgett and Bourke.

=== Brewarrina Bridge ===
The wrought-iron Brewarrina Bridge over the Barwon River was officially opened on 7 December 1888. The main span is 16.8 metres in length and there are four approach spans on each side, all approximately 9 metres in length. The overall length is 91 metres and the bridge has a single lane 4.5 metres wide. The roadway is carried on cross-girders covered with timber deck. It is the second oldest lift bridge in New South Wales, and has been assessed as being of State significance. The bridge was damaged in 2000 and is now closed to vehicular traffic, and used as a pedestrian bridge only.

== Major junctions ==
LGA	Location	km	mi	Destinations	Notes
Bourke	Bourke	0	0.0	Mitchell Highway (B71) – Nyngan, Dubbo, Bathurst, Cunnamulla	Western terminus of western section of highway at T intersection Western terminus of route B76
Barwon River		42	26	Bourke Bridge	
Brewarrina	Brewarrina	97	60	Belmore Street (south) – Brewarrina; Bathurst Street (east), to Arthur Hall VC Way – Gongolgon, Coolabah	Uncontrolled 4-way intersection
Barwon River		99	62	Brewarrina Bridge	
Brewarrina	Brewarrina	105	65	Goodooga Road – Goodooga, Hebel	T intersection
Barwon River		224	139	Dangar Bridge	
Walgett	Walgett	223	139	Ginge Road – Cumborah	T intersection
Walgett	Walgett	230	140	Castlereagh Highway (B55 south, B55/B76 north) – Coonamble, Gilgandra	Eastern terminus of western section of highway at roundabout Route B76 continues north along Castlereagh Highway
Gap in route
Walgett	Walgett	235	146	Castlereagh Highway (B55/B76 north) – Lightning Ridge, Collarenebri	Western terminus of western-central section of highway at T intersection
Namoi River		370	230	Tulladunna Bridge	
Namoi River		379	235	Collins Bridge	
Narrabri	Narrabri	412	256	Newell Highway (A39 north) – Moree	Eastern terminus of western-central section of highway
Gap in route
Narrabri	Narrabri	417	259	Newell Highway (A39 south) – Gilgandra, Dubbo	Western terminus of eastern-central section of highway at roundabout Western terminus of route B51
Gunnedah	Gunnedah	509	316	Oxley Highway (B56 west) – Coonabarabran	Eastern terminus of eastern-central section of highway
Gap in route
Gunnedah	Gunnedah	512	318	Oxley Highway (B56 east) – Tamworth, Port Macquarie	Western terminus of eastern section of highway
Liverpool Plains	Willow Tree	605	376	New England Highway (A15) – Tamworth, Singleton, Newcastle	Eastern terminus of eastern section of highway Eastern terminus of route B51
1.000 mi = 1.609 km; 1.000 km = 0.621 mi: Route transition

== See also ==
- Highways in Australia
- List of highways in New South Wales
