= Gooloogong =

- Town
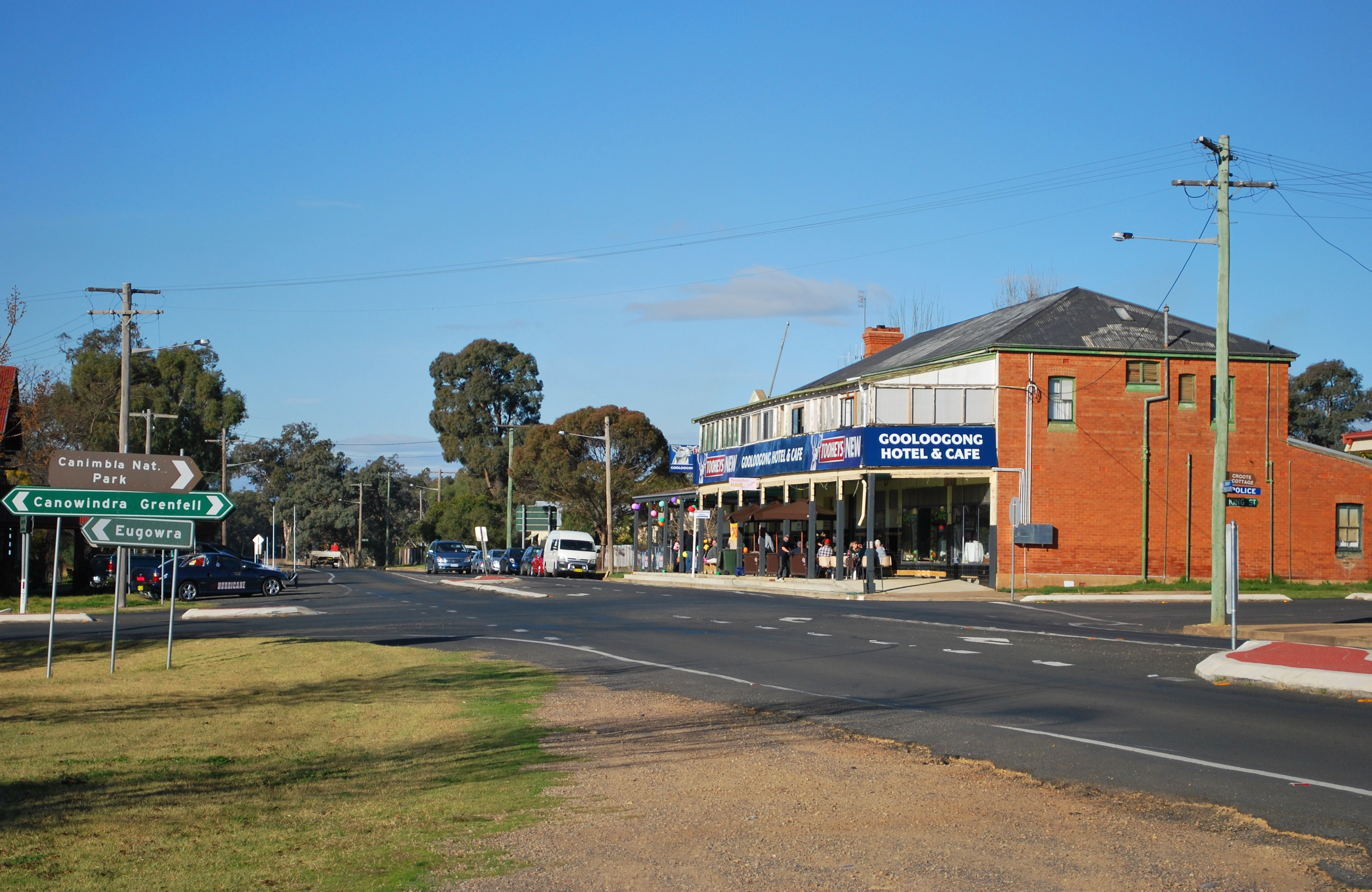
- Town centre

- Coordinates: 33°37′S 148°24′E
- Country: Australia
- State: New South Wales
- LGA: Cowra Shire, Forbes Shire

Government
  - State electorate: *Cootamundra; Orange
  - Federal division: *Parkes; Riverina
- Elevation: 270 m (890 ft)

Population
  - Total: 408 (2021 census)
- Postcode: 2805
- Mean max temp: 43.2 °C (109.8 °F)
- Mean min temp: −3.7 °C (25.3 °F)

Gooloogong is a village located in central New South Wales, Australia. At the 2021 census, Gooloogong and the surrounding area had a population of 408.

Gooloogong is mostly in Cowra Shire, although some of it is in Forbes Shire. The village is located almost midway between the towns of Cowra and Forbes on the Lachlan Valley Way. It is close to the historic township of Canowindra and the Lachlan River flows nearby.

Used initially for a time by William Redfern Watt, wealthy pastoralist, nephew of Dr. William Redfern and superintendent of the late Dr.'s estates, 'Goolagong' became a pastoral lease held by Irish convict emancipist Edmond Sheahan when the new district of Lachlan was established. Goolagong was originally 22,400 acres on which Sheahan ran cattle. The Robertson Land Act of 1861 ended pastoral leases and opened the land to freeholders. With the advent of new settlers a town soon became established. Devastated after a severe flood the town was re-established a little further, and higher to the east. Little is left at that location as the settlement was relocated to escape flooding. Gooloogong is known for its log cabin hall.

The village has a successful local market held on the second Sunday of each even month of the year at the Recreation Park.
