= Wombat, New South Wales =

Wombat
- Town
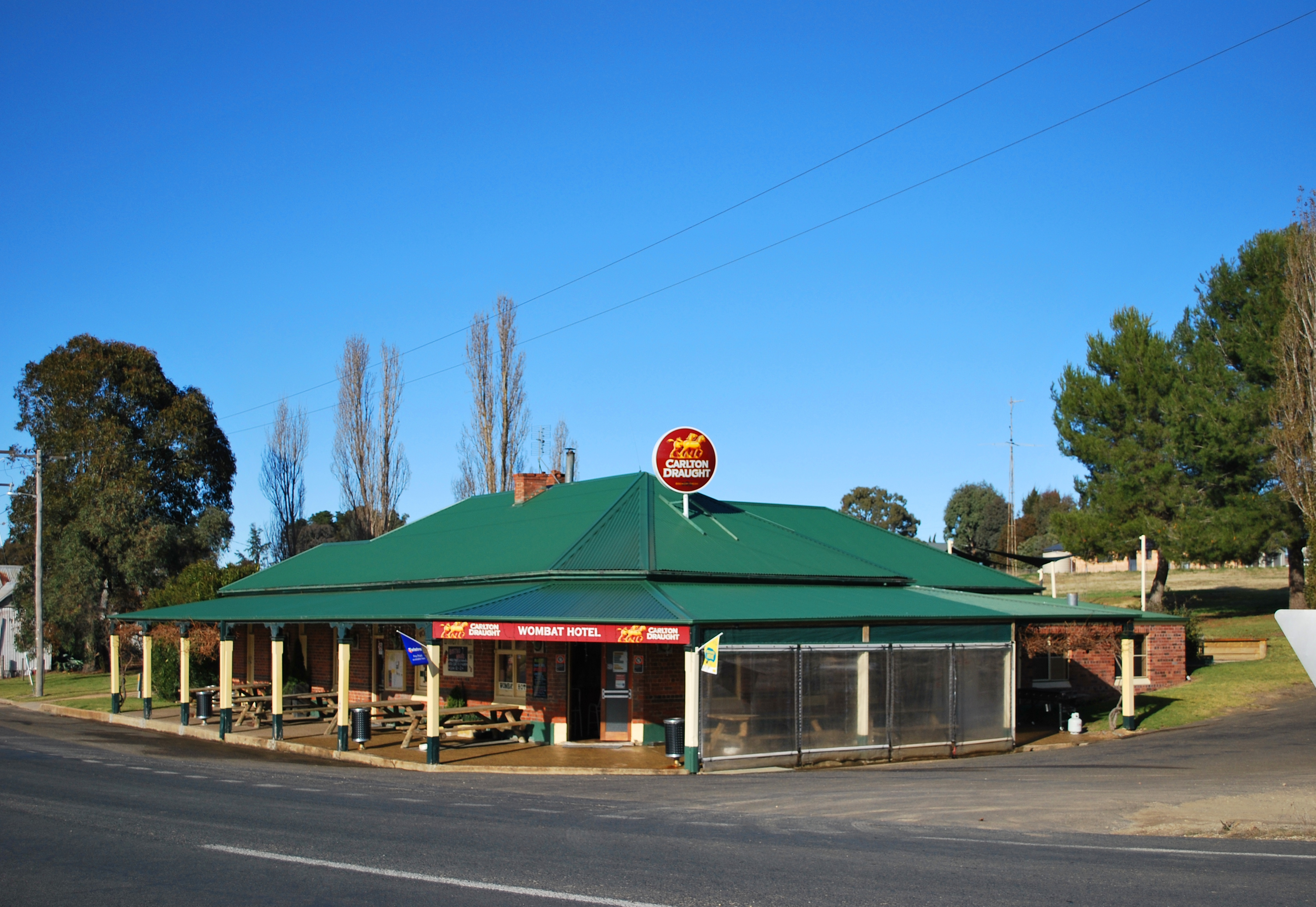
- Wombat Hotel, trading continuously since 1877

- Coordinates: 34°25′30″S 148°14′31″E
- Country: Australia
- State: New South Wales
- LGA: Hilltops Council
- Location: 362 km (225 mi) SW of Sydney; 14 km (8.7 mi) S of Young; 16 km (9.9 mi) N of Wallendbeen
- Established: 1865

Government
  - State electorate: Cootamundra
  - Federal division: Riverina

Population
  - Total: 280 (SAL 2021)
- Postcode: 2587

Wombat is a town in South West Slopes region of New South Wales, Australia. It is situated on the Olympic Highway, 15 kilometres (9.3 mi) south-west of the regional centre of Young. It is in the local government area of Hilltops Council.

== History ==
The area was occupied by the indigenous Wiradjuri people for thousands of years.

- 1860 – Gold discovered at nearby Young. 20,000 miners converge on surrounding areas. Wombat Post Office opened on 16 July 1862.
- 1865 – The village of Wombat was established. Many Chinese miners moved to the area taking plots of land.
- 1867 – Wombat Public School was founded in a bark hut
- 1873 – foundation stone of St Matthew's Church of England laid
- 1875 – Roman Catholic Church built
- 1877 – Wombat Hotel began trading
- 1880 – Carlo Lazzarini, (1880–1952), NSW politician and trade unionist was born in Wombat
- 1895 – Mechanics Institute opened
- 1903 – Wombat Hotel's current building constructed
- 1910 – Roman Catholic convent opened
- 1921 – shop and post office destroyed by fire
- 1923 – Wombat Soldiers' Memorial hall officially opened
- 1924 – the old hall was destroyed by fire
- 1950s & 1960s – The Olympic Way highway was built through

At the 2016 census, Wombat had a population of 225.

== Attractions ==
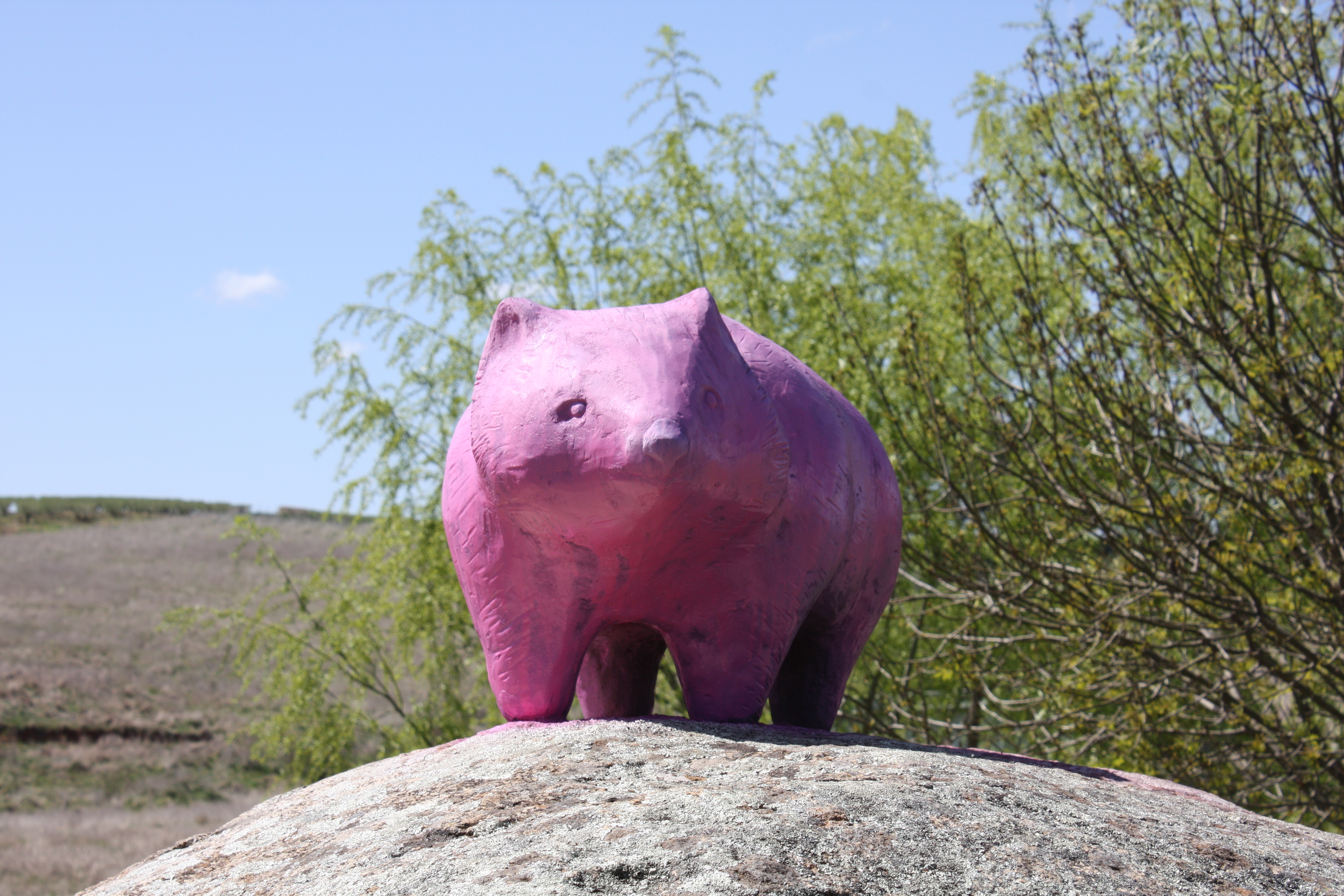
- Visitors are welcomed to the town of Wombat in NSW by a 50cm statue of a pink wombat.
  "The Wombat Hotel", which has had a continuous liquor licence since 1877, making it the longest in New South Wales.
- "Allambie Orchard", A cherry orchard that allows people to pick their own fruit in season
- "Wombat Heights", a farm on a hill which produces jam, fruit wine and liqueurs from traditional recipes. Visitors are invited to do-it-themselves.
- "Wilkies Cottage Restaurant/Café".
- "The Old Convent Geranium Nursery", Hope St, offers many colours & varieties of miniatures of variegated, climbing and scented Pelargonium geraniums.

The highway into Wombat is graced with a statue of a wombat, made of local material, which was unveiled in 2002.

== Gallery ==
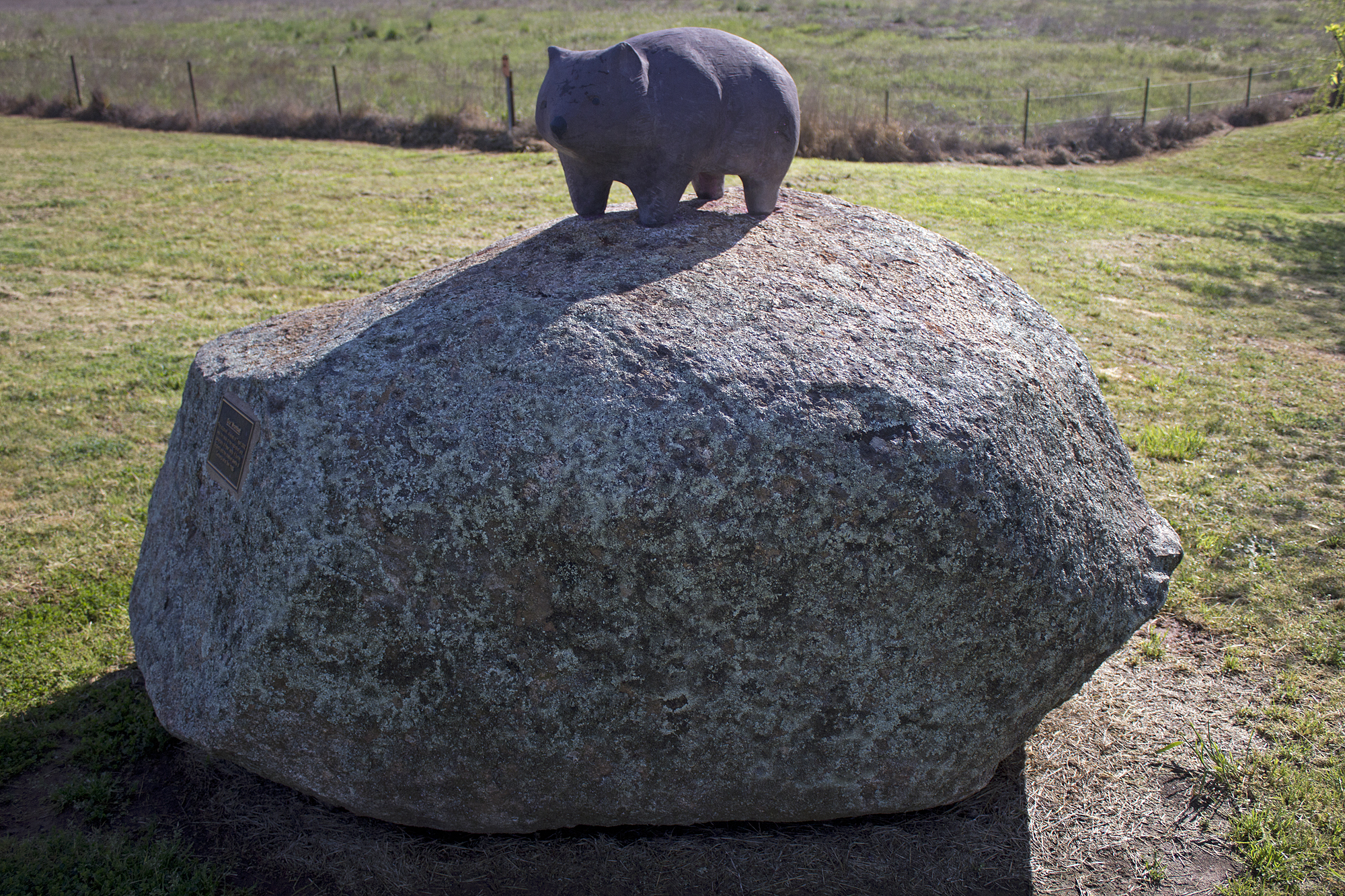
Wombat sculpture at Wombat, NSW

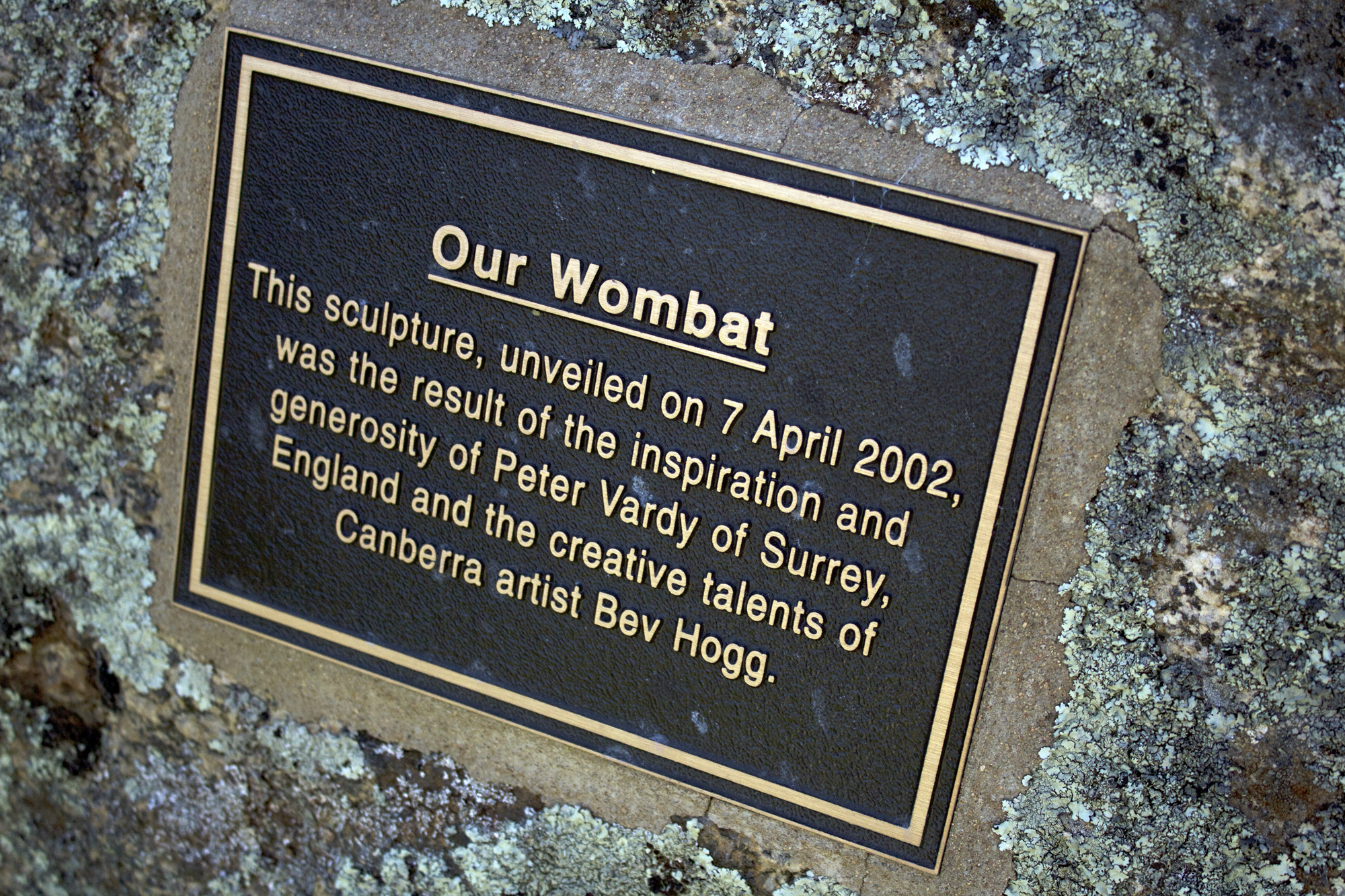

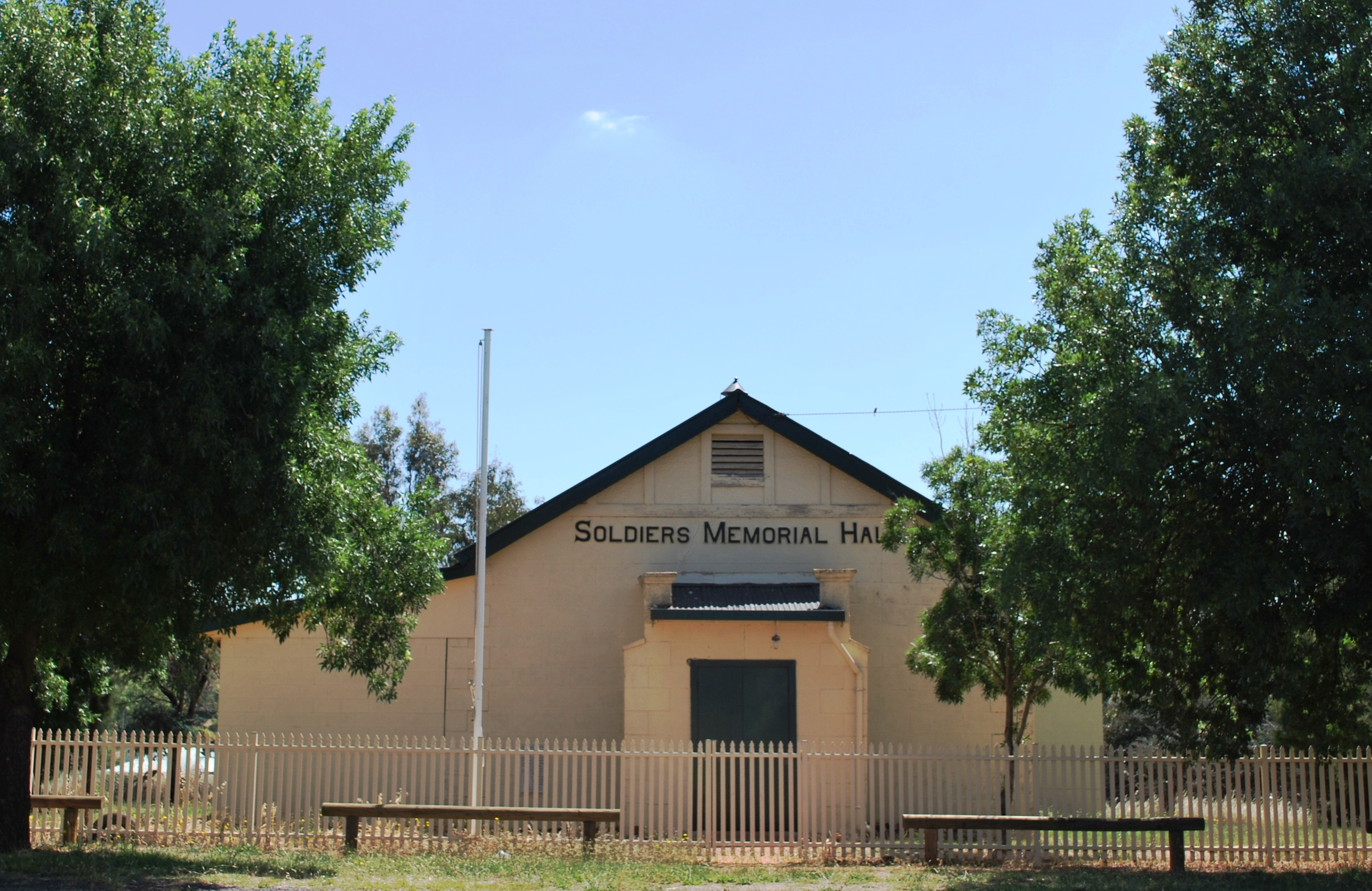
Wombat Soldiers Memorial Hall

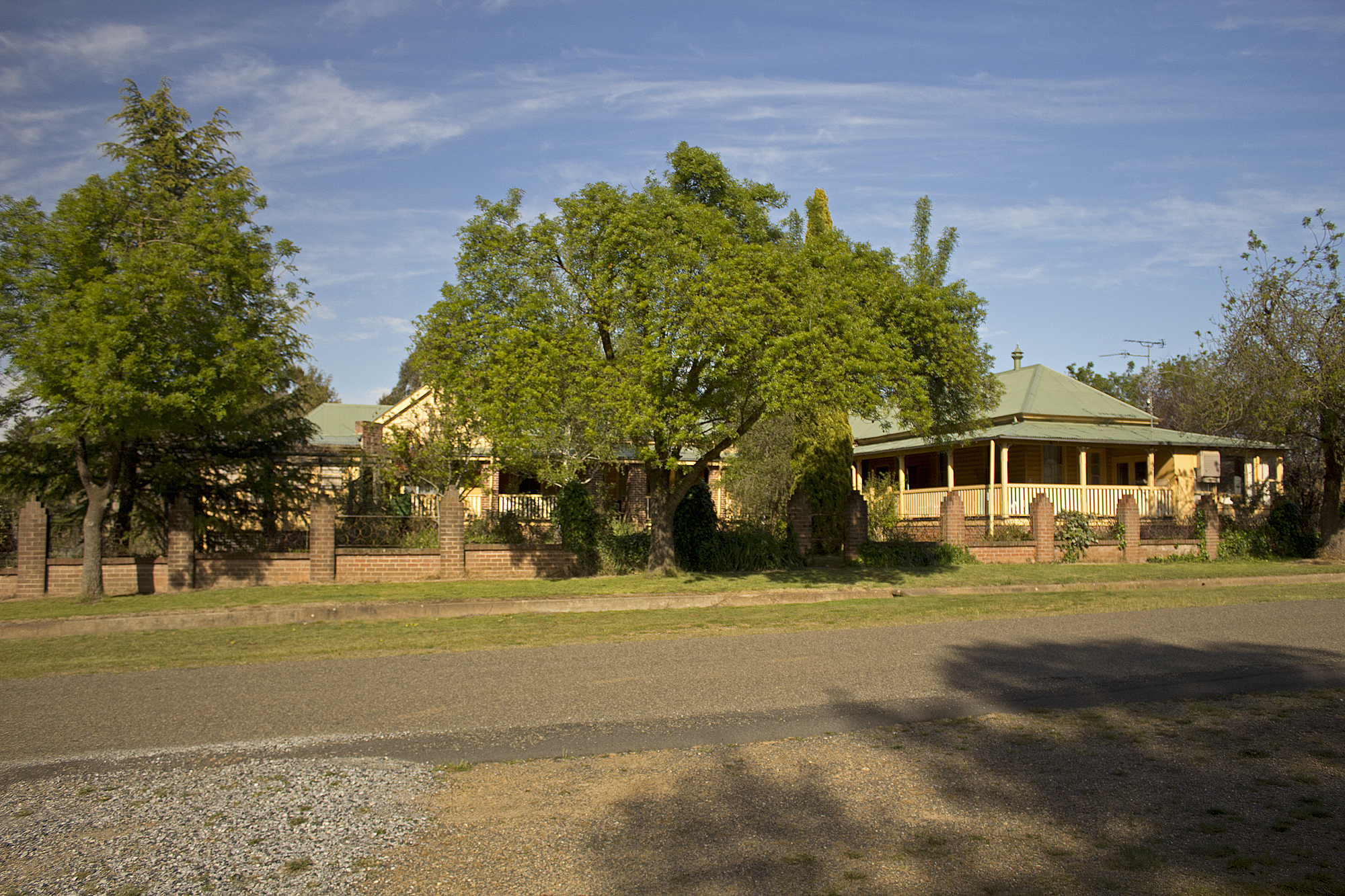
The Old Convent in Wombat

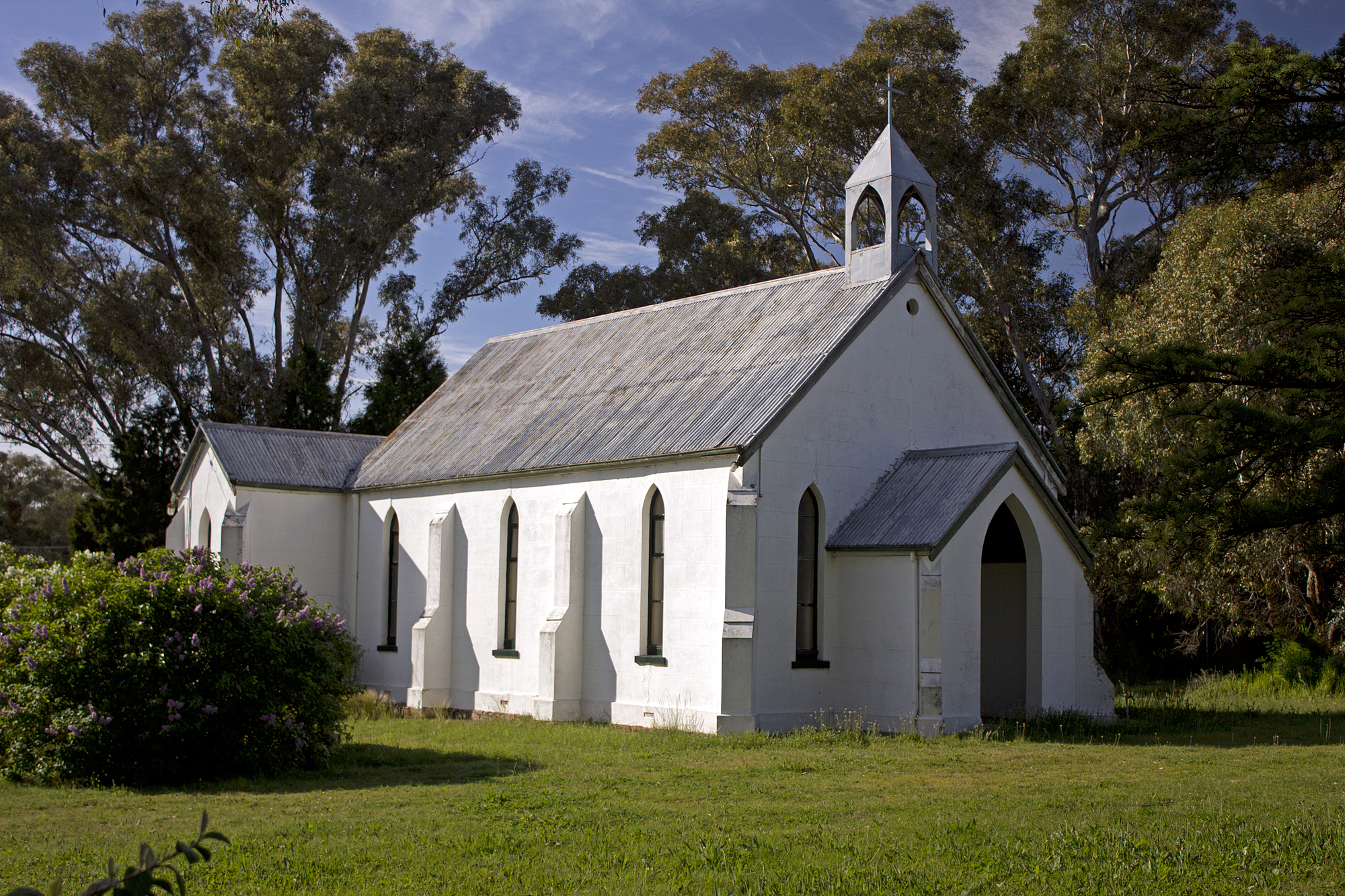
St Matthew's Anglican Church in Wombat

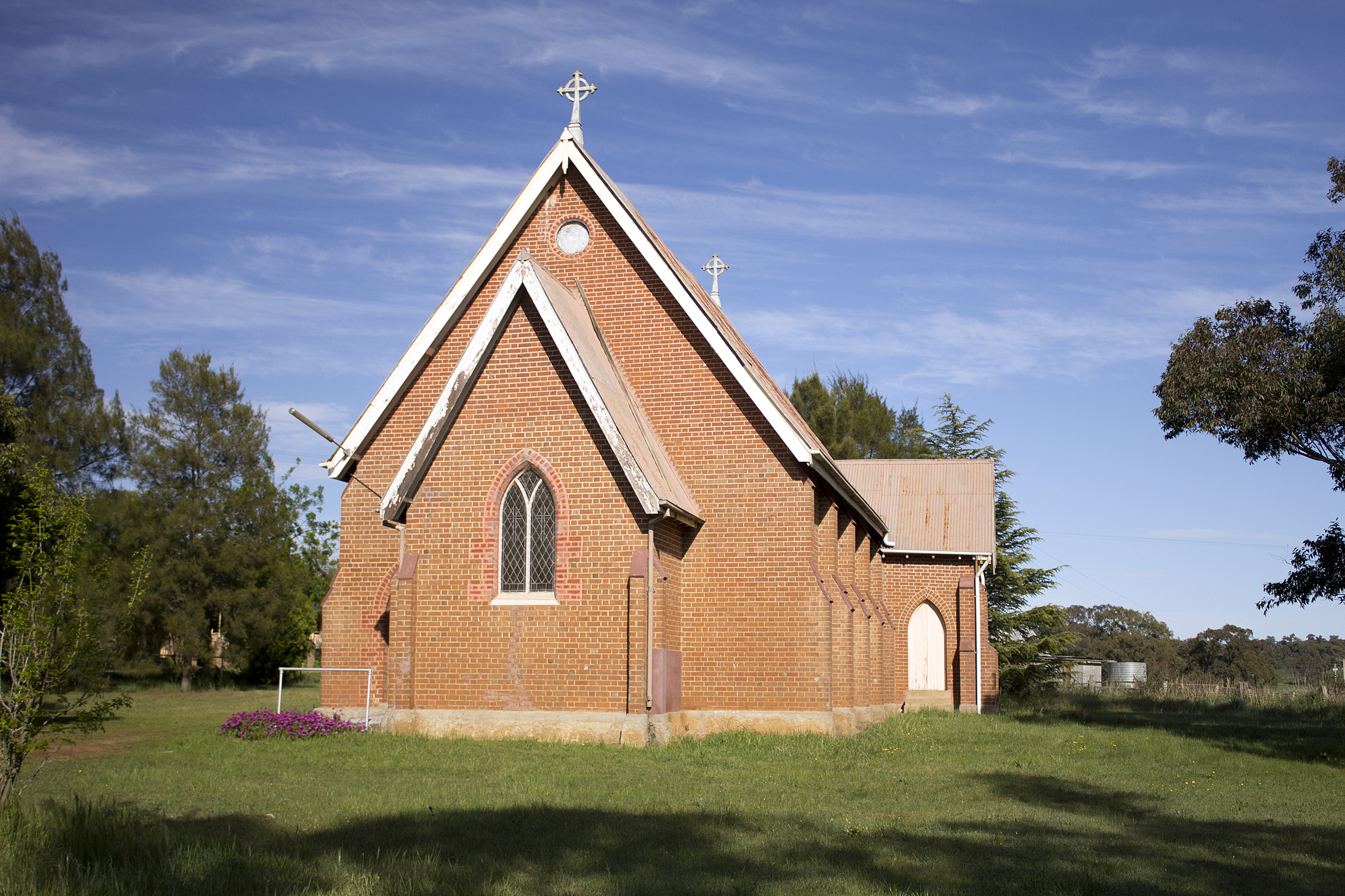
St Columbanus Catholic Church in Wombat
