= Mitchell Highway =

Highway in Queensland and New South Wales

Mitchell Highway Queensland–New South Wales
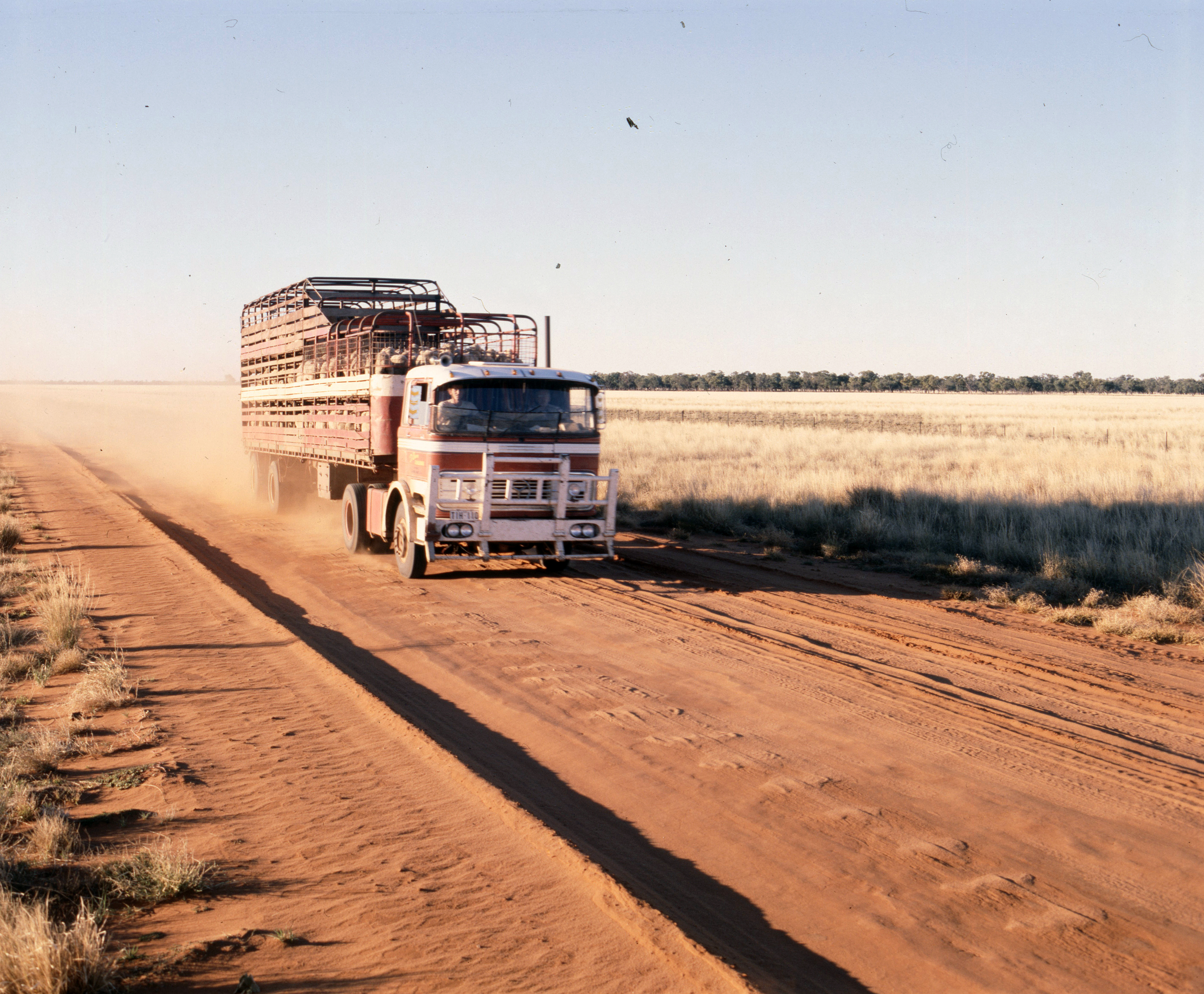
- Road freight on the Mitchell Highway between Cunnamulla and Charleville, 1979

General information
- Type: Highway
- Length: 1,095 km (680 mi)
- Gazetted: August 1928 (as Main Road 7)
- Route number(s): Alternate A2 (2004–present) (Augathella–Charleville); A71 (2004–present) (Charleville–QLD/NSW border); B71 (2013–present) (QLD/NSW border–Nyngan); A32 (2013–present) (Nyngan–Bathurst)
- Former route number: National Route 71 (1955–2004/2013) (Augathella–Nyngan); National Route 32 (1955–2013) (Nyngan–Bathurst)

Major junctions
- North end: Landsborough Highway; Augathella, Queensland
- Diamantina Developmental Road; Warrego Highway; Balonne Highway; Kamilaroi Highway; Kidman Way; Barrier Highway; Oxley Highway; Newell Highway; Golden Highway; Peabody Road; Mid-Western Highway
- South end: Great Western Highway; Bathurst, New South Wales

Location(s)
- Major settlements: Charleville, Cunnamulla, Bourke, Nyngan, Dubbo, Orange, Bathurst

Highway system
- Highways in Australia; National Highway • Freeways in Australia; Highways in Queensland; Highways in New South Wales

Mitchell Highway is an outback state highway located in the central and south western regions of Queensland and the northern and central western regions of New South Wales in Australia. The southern part of Mitchell Highway forms part of the National Highway A32 B71 corridor, which stretches from Sydney to Brisbane via Dubbo. Mitchell Highway also forms part of the shortest route between Sydney and Darwin, via Bourke and Mount Isa, making it an important road link for the transport of passengers and freight for regional New South Wales and Queensland. The highway is a part of route Alternative A2 between Augathella and Charleville, route A71 and B71 between Charleville and Nyngan, and part of route A32 between Nyngan and Bathurst.

In New South Wales, the highway's south-eastern terminus is at its junction with Great Western and Mid-Western Highways, and it links with Golden, Newell, Oxley, Barrier and Kamilaroi Highways. In Queensland, the highway links with Balonne and Warrego Highways and its northern terminus is at its junction with Landsborough Highway.

== Route ==
Mitchell Highway lies west of the Great Dividing Range and in New South Wales runs generally northwest–southeast and in Queensland, runs generally north–south in the central western and southwest parts of that state.

From its northern terminus at a junction with the Landsborough Highway near Augathella, Mitchell Highway heads south as route Alternative A2 through Charleville, meeting Warrego Highway heading east as Alternative A2. As route A71, the highway continues south through Cunnamulla, meeting with Balonne Highway, and then further south to the state border between Queensland and New South Wales (called Barringun Road), where it changes to route B71. The Mitchell Highway then travels south for approximately 250km (155 mi) before reaching the town of Bourke, passing through the localities of Barringun and Enngonia.

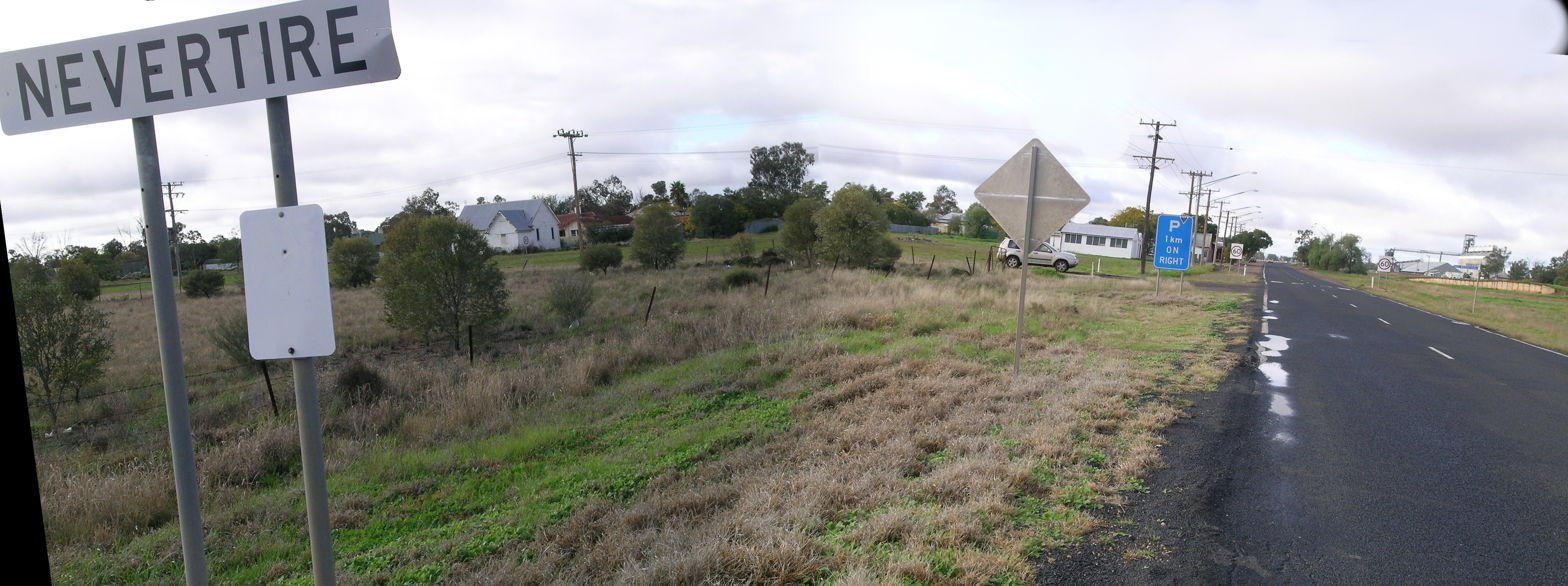
A typical narrow width of Mitchell Highway in the regional New South Wales village of Nevertire

Approximately 5 kilometres (3 mi) north of Bourke it crosses the Darling River before heading into Bourke where it forms junctions with Kamilaroi Highway heading east and Kidman Way heading south. From this point Mitchell Highway generally heads southeast through to Nyngan, meeting with Barrier Highway, and continues south as route A32. At Nevertire the highway meets Oxley Highway, before passing through Narromine and then heads generally east to the major rural centre of Dubbo, where it meets Newell Highway, before it crosses the Macquarie River and heads south towards Wellington, crossing the Macquarie River again. At Molong, the highway generally starts to head east towards Orange, where an alternative route diverts many heavy vehicles away from the city centre; the portion of Mitchell Highway that passes through Orange city centre is known locally as Summer Street. The southern terminus of Mitchell Highway is at a roundabout in Bathurst, at the junction of Mid-Western Highway to Cowra, and Great Western Highway to Sydney via the Blue Mountains.

== History ==
The passing of the Main Roads Act of 1924 through the Parliament of New South Wales provided for the declaration of Main Roads, roads partially funded by the State government through the Main Roads Board. The North-Western Highway was declared (as Main Road No. 7) on 8 August 1928, from the interchange with Great Western Highway and Mid-Western Highway in Bathurst, via Orange, Dubbo, Nyngan, and Bourke, to the border with Queensland; with the passing of the Main Roads (Amendment) Act of 1929 to provide for additional declarations of State Highways and Trunk Roads, this was amended to State Highway 7 on 8 April 1929. On 9 October 1936 the name was changed to the Mitchell Highway, in honour of Lieutenant Colonel Sir Thomas Mitchell, who was Surveyor-General of New South Wales in the 1820s and explored much of inland New South Wales, Victoria and Queensland.

The passing of the Roads Act of 1993 updated road classifications and the way they could be declared within New South Wales. Under this act, Mitchell Highway today retains its declaration as Highway 71, from the state border with Queensland at Barringun to the intersection with Great Western and Mid-Western Highways at Bathurst.

Mitchel Highway was signed National Route 71 between Augathella and Nygan, and National Route 32 between Nyngan and Bathurst, in 1955. With both states' conversion to their newer alphanumeric systems in 2004 and 2013, its former route numbers were updated to Alternative A2 between Augathella and Charleville and A71 between Charleville and the state border within Queensland in 2004, and B71 between the state border and Nyngan and A32 between Nyngan and Bathurst within New South Wales in 2013. In November 1972 the last section of the highway was sealed.

=== Truck explosion ===
On 5 September 2014, a truck travelling on Mitchell Highway rolled off a road bridge at Angellala Creek approximately 30 km south of Charleville (26.6541°S 146.1760°E). The truck was carrying 52 tonnes of ammonium nitrate which exploded. The blast destroyed the two road bridges and severely damaged the adjacent rail bridge. The blast was so powerful that the truck was disintegrated and the dangers posed by the remaining ammonium nitrate necessitated a 2 km exclusion zone around the site for a number of days. The large crater formed by the blast closed the highway necessitating detours of up to 600 km. The Department of Transport & Main Roads was allowed to commence work at the site on 13 September and by 23 September had constructed a temporary side track around the blast site suitable for cars, buses and light trucks. By 7 October, the side track had been upgraded to support road trains, ending the need to detour. In April 2015, the $10 million tender to reconstruct the highway and bridges were awarded and the construction work took place between June and November 2015. In early 2016, a competition was held to decide a new name for the bridge.

== Major intersections ==
State	LGA	Location	km	mi	Destinations	Notes
Queensland	Murweh	Augathella	0	0.0	Landsborough Highway (A2) – Cloncurry, Longreach, Morven	Northern terminus of Mitchell Highway and route Alternative A2
Queensland	Murweh	Charleville	77	48	Diamantina Developmental Road (State Route 14) – Quilpie, Windorah, Bedourie	
Queensland	Murweh	Charleville	78	48	Warrego Highway (Alt A2 east) – Morven, Roma, Dalby, Toowoomba	Northern terminus of route A71, route Alternative A2 continues east along Warrego Highway
Queensland	Paroo	Cunnamulla	278	173	Bulloo Developmental Road (west) – Lake Bindegolly National Park	
Queensland	Paroo	Cunnamulla	282	175	Balonne Highway (State Route 49) – St George, Dalby	
Queensland	Paroo	Barringun (QLD)	397	247	Mitchell Highway (A71)	Southern terminus of route A71
State border			397	247	Queensland – New South Wales state border	
New South Wales	Bourke	Barringun (NSW)	397	247	Mitchell Highway (B71)	Northern terminus of route B71
New South Wales	Darling River		528	328	Gateway Bridge	
New South Wales	Bourke	Bourke	533	331	Kamilaroi Highway (B76) – Brewarrina, Walgett, Narrabri, Gunnedah	
New South Wales	Bourke	Bourke	534	332	Kidman Way (B87) – Cobar, Hillston, Griffith, Jerilderie	
New South Wales	Bogan	Nyngan	736	457	Barrier Highway (A32 west) – Cobar, Wilcannia, Broken Hill, Burra	Southern terminus of route B71, route A32 continues west along Barrier Highway
New South Wales	Bogan	Nevertire	796	495	Oxley Highway (north) – Warren, Coonabarabran, Tamworth, Port Macquarie; Nevertire–Bogan Road (south) – Tottenham, Tullamore	
New South Wales	Narromine	Narromine	863	536	Peak Hill Road – Peak Hill, Parkes	Roundabout
New South Wales	Dubbo	Dubbo	901	560	Newell Highway (A39) – Moree, Gilgandra, Parkes, Narrandera	
New South Wales	Macquarie River		902	560	L.H. Ford Bridge	
New South Wales	Macquarie River		951	591	Macquarie Bridge over the river at Wellington	
New South Wales	Cabonne	Molong	1,018	633	Peabody Road (B81), to Escort Way (B81) – Canowindra, Cowra	
New South Wales	Orange	Orange	1,049	652	Northern Distributor Road (northeast) – Orange	Alternative route to bypass Orange city centre; roundabout
New South Wales	Orange	Orange	1,052	654	Escort Way – Eugowra, Forbes	
New South Wales	Orange	Orange	1,057	657	Northern Distributor Road (northwest) – Orange	Alternative route to bypass Orange city centre
New South Wales	Bathurst	Bathurst	1,095	680	Mid-Western Highway (A41 southwest) – Blayney, Cowra, Hay; Brilliant Street (southeast) – Bathurst, Mount Panorama Circuit	
New South Wales	Bathurst	Bathurst	1,095	680	Great Western Highway (A32 northeast) – Lithgow, Katoomba, Sydney	Southern terminus of highway at roundabout, route A32 continues east along Great Western Highway
1.000 mi = 1.609 km; 1.000 km = 0.621 mi: Route transition

== See also ==
- Highways in Australia
- Highways in New South Wales
- List of highways in Queensland
