= Burcher railway line =

Railway line in Australia

The Burcher railway line is a partly non-operational railway line in New South Wales, Australia, branching from the Cootamundra to Lake Cargelligo line at Wyalong Central.

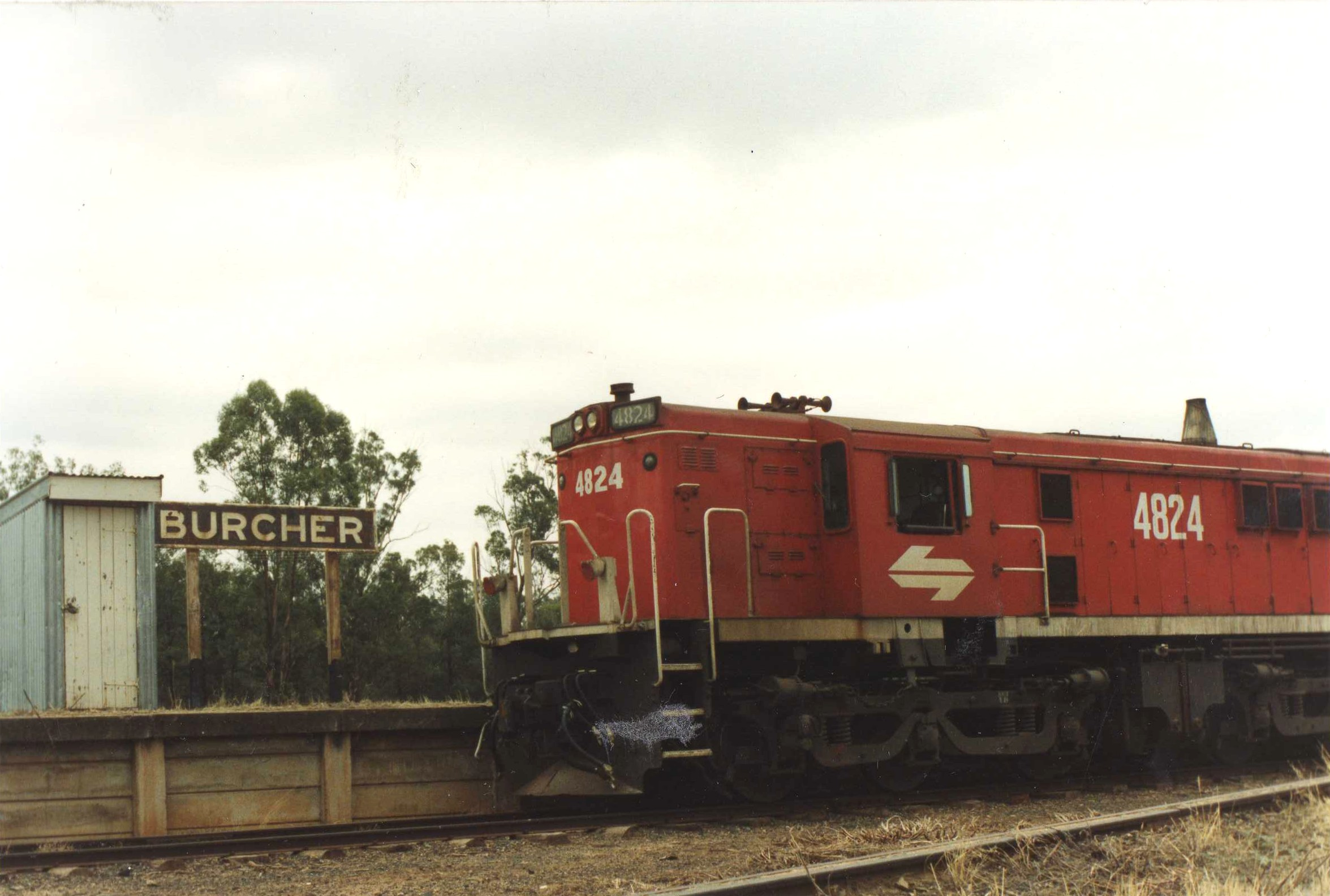
Locomotive 4824 stands at Burcher Station in February, 1990

== Construction ==
The construction of rail lines from Parkes to Condobolin, Forbes to Stockinbingal and Wyalong to Lake Cargelligo left a large area of land inside the bounds of those lines too far from rail facilities to make wheat production profitable.

Initial suggestions included a line from Ungarie to Condobolin and a survey was made in 1917, but shelved. A further inquiry in 1922 brought a recommendation for a line from Wyalong towards Condobolin and an Act authorising its construction was assented to on 21 December 1923. Construction began soon afterwards and the line was opened on 16 December 1929. Originally the terminus was called Euglo, but the name changed to Burcher on 4 August 1936.

== Traffic ==
When the line opened, services comprised a Mixed train on Mondays to Euglo, returning the following day. By 1970, the train had been classified as a Goods train with Passenger Accommodation. In 1972, the timetable was changed to provide for a return journey on Mondays, however there was no longer any passenger accommodation.

== Stations ==
Station Name	Date opened	Date closed
Wyalong Junction	16 December 1929	still in use
Wyrra Station	16 December 1929	6 July 1972
Clear Ridge platform	16 December 1929	4 May 1975
Lake Cowal Station	16 December 1929	4 May 1975
Corringle Station	16 December 1929	6 July 1972
Wamboyne Station	16 December 1929	4 May 1975
Burcher Station.	16 December 1929	12 March 1992

== Demise ==
The "last train" to Burcher ran on 12 March 1992, returning the following day after loading. Despite the fact that this line was only "mothballed", State Rail set about recovering a number of sleepers from the branch, to use elsewhere. This did not go unnoticed by local farmers who took the matter up with their local Member of State Parliament. State Rail subsequently agreed to replace the sleepers. Trains did in fact run the following wheat season.

The ARTC officially "suspended" the line on 30 June 2005. A Safe Notice issued for the line states "Closure of branch line and suspension of train services" with a stop block placed on the Burcher railway line junction at West Wyalong .
