= Parish of Hawarden =

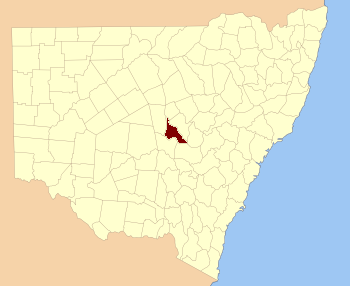
Kennedy County NSW.

Hawarden, New South Wales is a cadastral parish of Kennedy County New South Wales, Australia. Hawarden is south of the towns of Tottenham and Albert, New South Wales.
