= Cunningham County =

Cunningham
- Cadastral division
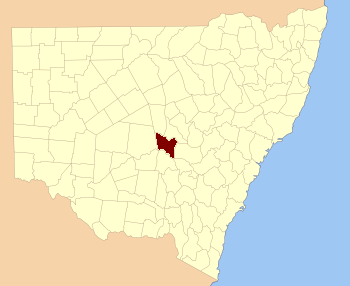
- Location in New South Wales
- Country: Australia
- State: New South Wales
Lands administrative divisions around Cunningham
Flinders	Kennedy	Kennedy
Blaxland	Cunningham	Ashburnham
Dowling	Gipps	Forbes

Cunningham County is one of the 141 cadastral divisions of New South Wales. It is located to the north of the Lachlan River near Condobolin.

Cunningham County was named in honour of the botanist and explorer Allan Cunningham (1791–1839).

== Parishes within this county ==
A full list of parishes found within this county; their current LGA and mapping coordinates to the approximate centre of each location is as follows:

Parish	LGA	Coordinates
Baratta	Lachlan Shire Council	32°59′54″S 147°02′04″E
Bedgerebong	Forbes Shire Council	33°18′54″S 147°40′04″E
Berewombenia	Forbes Shire Council	33°05′54″S 147°30′04″E
Bimbella	Lachlan Shire Council	32°59′54″S 146°53′04″E
Bomobbin	Forbes Shire Council	33°10′54″S 147°20′04″E
Boona East	Lachlan Shire Council	32°42′54″S 147°12′04″E
Boona West	Lachlan Shire Council	32°39′54″S 147°05′04″E
Botfields	Parkes Shire Council	33°00′54″S 147°45′04″E
Bundaburra	Lachlan Shire Council	33°01′54″S 147°19′04″E
Burrawong	Forbes Shire Council	33°13′54″S 147°31′04″E
Byong	Parkes Shire Council	33°00′54″S 147°35′04″E
Carroboblin	Parkes Shire Council	33°12′54″S 147°42′04″E
Condobolin	Lachlan Shire Council	33°02′54″S 147°09′04″E
Cookeys Plains	Parkes Shire Council	33°04′54″S 147°39′04″E
Corella	Lachlan Shire Council	32°41′54″S 147°18′04″E
Corridgery	Forbes Shire Council	33°18′54″S 147°46′04″E
Derriwong	Lachlan Shire Council	33°06′54″S 147°21′04″E
Dulhunty	Parkes Shire Council	33°09′54″S 147°47′04″E
Ellerslie	Lachlan Shire Council	32°48′54″S 147°19′04″E
Elsmore	Lachlan Shire Council	32°54′54″S 147°20′04″E
Emu Plains	Lachlan Shire Council	32°53′54″S 147°11′04″E
Gillenbine	Lachlan Shire Council	32°48′54″S 147°34′04″E
Gindoono	Lachlan Shire Council	32°36′25″S 146°54′37″E
Goobang	Forbes Shire Council	33°11′54″S 147°35′04″E
Greenock	Lachlan Shire Council	32°49′09″S 146°53′31″E
Gulgo	Lachlan Shire Council	33°02′54″S 147°03′04″E
Gunning	Parkes Shire Council	33°13′54″S 147°48′04″E
Gunningbland	Parkes Shire Council	33°04′54″S 147°48′04″E
Jerula	Lachlan Shire Council	32°49′29″S 147°10′33″E
Julandery	Lachlan Shire Council	32°54′18″S 146°44′15″E
Kalinga	Lachlan Shire Council	33°01′54″S 146°44′04″E
Kars	Parkes Shire Council	33°02′54″S 147°31′04″E
Kiargathur	Lachlan Shire Council	33°02′54″S 146°50′04″E
Mamre	Lachlan Shire Council	32°42′12″S 146°41′45″E
Melrose	Lachlan Shire Council	32°39′54″S 147°01′04″E
Micabil	Lachlan Shire Council	33°03′54″S 147°00′04″E
Milpose	Parkes Shire Council	33°00′54″S 147°51′04″E
Monomie	Parkes Shire Council	33°07′54″S 147°42′04″E
Monwonga	Forbes Shire Council	33°14′54″S 147°36′04″E
Mount Nobby	Lachlan Shire Council	32°45′24″S 146°55′15″E
Mowabla	Lachlan Shire Council	32°51′54″S 147°04′04″E
Mulguthrie	Forbes Shire Council	33°11′54″S 147°25′04″E
Murda	Lachlan Shire Council	33°00′54″S 147°08′04″E
Murga	Lachlan Shire Council	32°51′54″S 147°27′04″E
Murrumbogie	Lachlan Shire Council	32°59′54″S 147°26′04″E
Oxley North	Lachlan Shire Council	32°28′12″S 146°37′32″E
Oxley South	Lachlan Shire Council	32°33′28″S 146°39′45″E
Palisthan	Lachlan Shire Council	32°50′13″S 146°44′33″E
Plevna	Parkes Shire Council	32°52′54″S 147°44′04″E
Sebastopol	Lachlan Shire Council	32°52′54″S 147°29′04″E
Taratta	Lachlan Shire Council	32°43′54″S 147°04′04″E
Tinda	Lachlan Shire Council	32°35′03″S 146°48′02″E
Tollingo	Lachlan Shire Council	32°42′10″S 146°49′50″E
Trundle	Parkes Shire Council	32°56′54″S 147°44′04″E
Walker	Lachlan Shire Council	32°29′40″S 146°44′07″E
Wicklow	Lachlan Shire Council	32°23′35″S 146°37′00″E
Willama	Lachlan Shire Council	32°38′54″S 146°41′32″E
Wollongong	Lachlan Shire Council	33°06′54″S 147°16′04″E
Yarrabandai	Forbes Shire Council	33°08′54″S 147°32′04″E
