= Fifield, New South Wales =

Town and mining field in New South Wales, Australia

Fifield
- Town
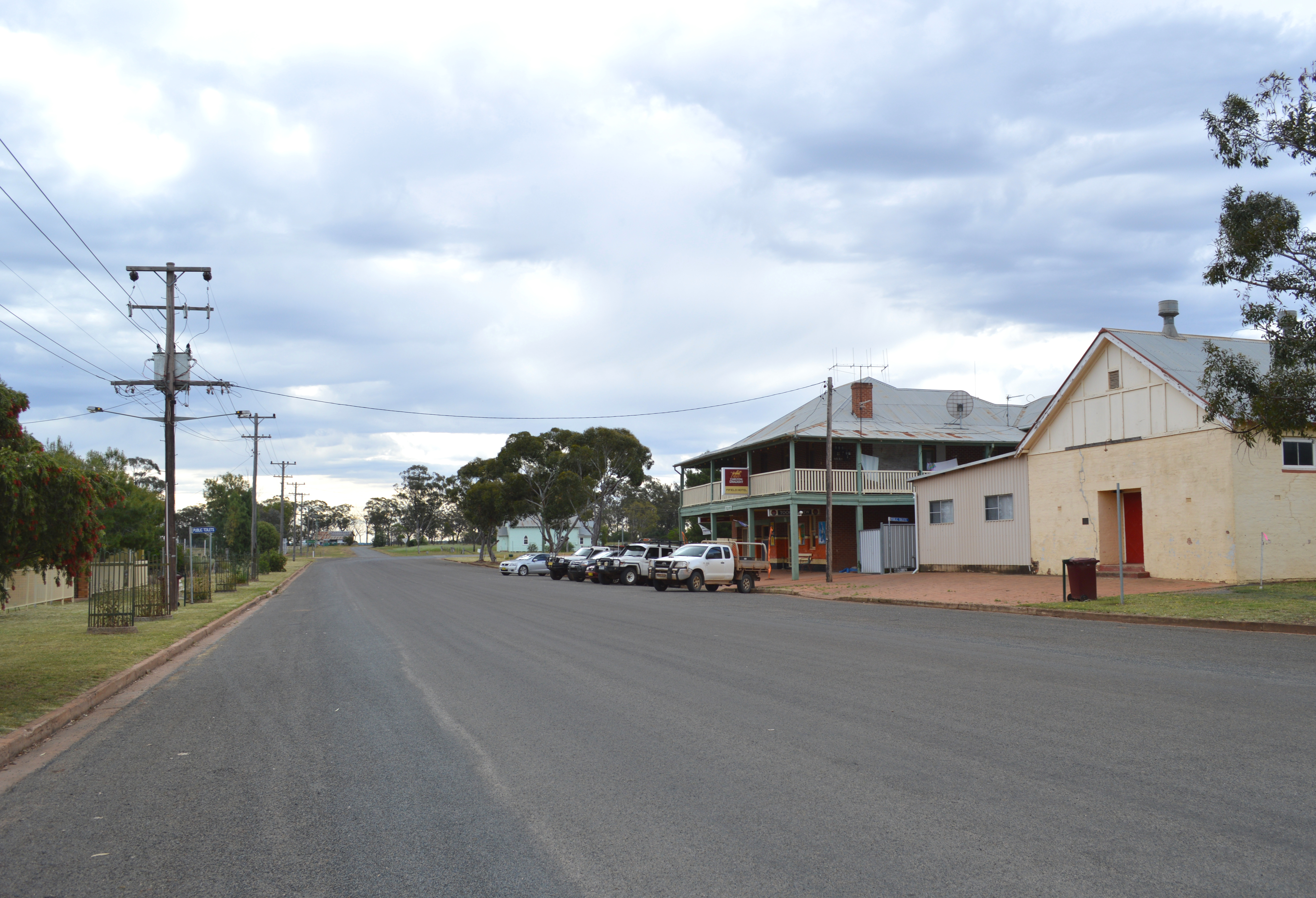
- Main street. The Fifield Hotel is on the right.

- Coordinates: 32°48′27″S 147°27′33″E
- Country: Australia
- State: New South Wales
- LGA: Lachlan Shire
- Location: 449 km (279 mi) WNW of Sydney; 92 km (57 mi) NW of Parkes; 52 km (32 mi) N of Condobolin; 80 km (50 mi) S of Tottenham; 31 km (19 mi) NW of Trundle

Government
  - State electorate: Barwon
  - Federal division: Parkes

Population
  - Total: 287 (2011 census)
- Postcode: 2875

Fifield is a small town in central New South Wales, renowned for its deposits of alluvial gold and platinum, as well as the companies trying to find their source. The name is also used for the surrounding area for postal and statistical purposes. At the 2011 census, Fifield and the surrounding area had a population of 287 people.

The area now known as Fifield lies on the traditional land of Wiradjuri people.

== History ==
=== Mining ===
In May 1893, W. J. H. Slee, Chief Inspector of Mines of New South Wales, sent a telegram reporting a payable gold find on the mining claim of "Fifield, Land and party", about 22 miles from Trundle, at what was then known as Burra Burra or Burra. The new find was around 2 miles from the site of an earlier gold mining location. He found around 800 men working the area, and, about 10 miles further west, another 200 on a field with payable tin. By September 1893, the goldfield was being referred to as 'Fifield', and the presence of platinum was reported by the end of October 1894. In October 1895, J.B. Jaquet, the geological surveyor, reported on the platinum deposits in the area.

The alluvial deposits in the area were paleochannels, or 'leads'; Gillenbine, Fifield and Platina leads.

Around 2½ miles south of Fifield, the Platina lead, the largest of the three leads, was about 3 km long and 10 to 25m deep. It lay slightly to the west of the modern-day Fifield Road, centred on a point west of its intersection with Platina Road. At its peak, there was a settlement there.

Over the life of the field, around 20,000 ounces (650 kg) of platinum were produced.

Magnesite, a magnesium carbonate (MgCO_{3}), sometimes containing traces of nickel and cobalt, was also mined within the locality.

The area remains of interest for mineral exploitation, especially for the rare alloying metal scandium, which is needed for the supply chain of critical US military components. Scandium has essential applications for semiconductors and high-performance aluminium alloys for aerospace industry. The Fifield mining area could become a key supplier of the Western world with scandium, a rare trivalent metal, essential for defence aircraft and data centres. This follows the Australian mining company Sunrise Energy Metals securing a US$400 million ($566m) pledge by the Pentagon to strengthen its supply chain.

=== Village of Fifield ===
A settlement sprang up, known as Fifield after one of the prospectors, and a hotel was being erected there by October 1893; other permanent buildings were being erected too, and there were already some shops forming the core of a town, a baker, butcher and blacksmith.

The Village of Fiefield was proclaimed on 30 July 1896. However, the village seems to have been more commonly known as Fifield from its earliest days. The village, tank, and cemetery called Fiefield, were renamed, Fifield, officially, in 1979.

Fiefield Post Office opened on 6 September 1893, was renamed Fifield in 1894 and closed in 1981. There was a school, always known as Fifield, from July 1894 to August 1973.

The village had a racecourse, where race meetings were held, from around 1896 to at least 1940. It was also used for other sporting and athletic activities, at least into the beginning of the 1950s. The racecourse ceased to exist, officially, in 1979.

The village has a Catholic church, hotel, war memorial, cemetery, and a 'tank'—or ground tank, an excavated water reservoir, typically found further west, in more arid areas of New South Wales than Fifield. It still supplies the village with untreated non-potable water. There is a plaque commemorating Ruby Stevenson, who operated the village's water pump every day for 35 years. Close to the cemetery is an 80 acre piece of cleared land, once the village's racecourse.

The main street, Slee Street, is named after William Henry John Slee.
