= Parish of Carolina =

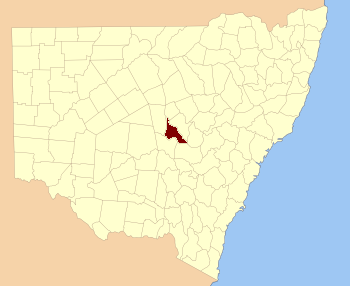
Kennedy County NSW.

Carolina located at 32°09′54″S 147°26′04″e is a cadastral parish in Kennedy County New South Wales.

Carolina Parish lies between the town of Tottenham, New South Wales and the Bogan River, and the landscape is generally flat with patches of remnant scrub between stretches of agriculture.
