= Parish of Ossory =

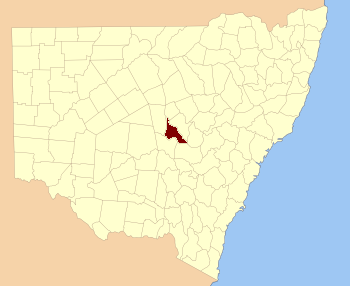
Kennedy County NSW.

Ossory Parish located at 32°26′54″S 147°44′04″ is a cadastral parish of Kennedy County New South Wales.

The Parish is on the Bogan River between Tullymore and Albert, New South Wales.
