= Parish of Moodana (Kennedy County) =

Australian cadastral parish

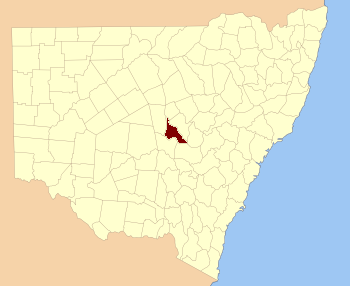
Kennedy County NSW.

Moodana, New South Wales is a cadastral parish of Kennedy County New South Wales.

Moodana, New South Wales is north of Tottenham, New South Wales on the Bogan River.
