= Parish of Merilba =

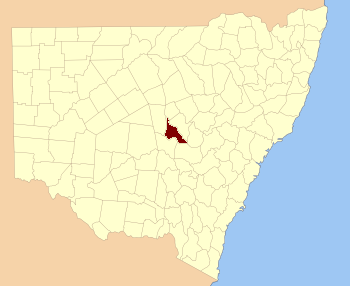
Kennedy County NSW.

Merilba, New South Wales is a cadastral parish of Kennedy County, New South Wales.

Merilba is on the Bogan River between Nyngan and Tottenham, New South Wales.
