= Burcher, New South Wales =

Burcher
- Town
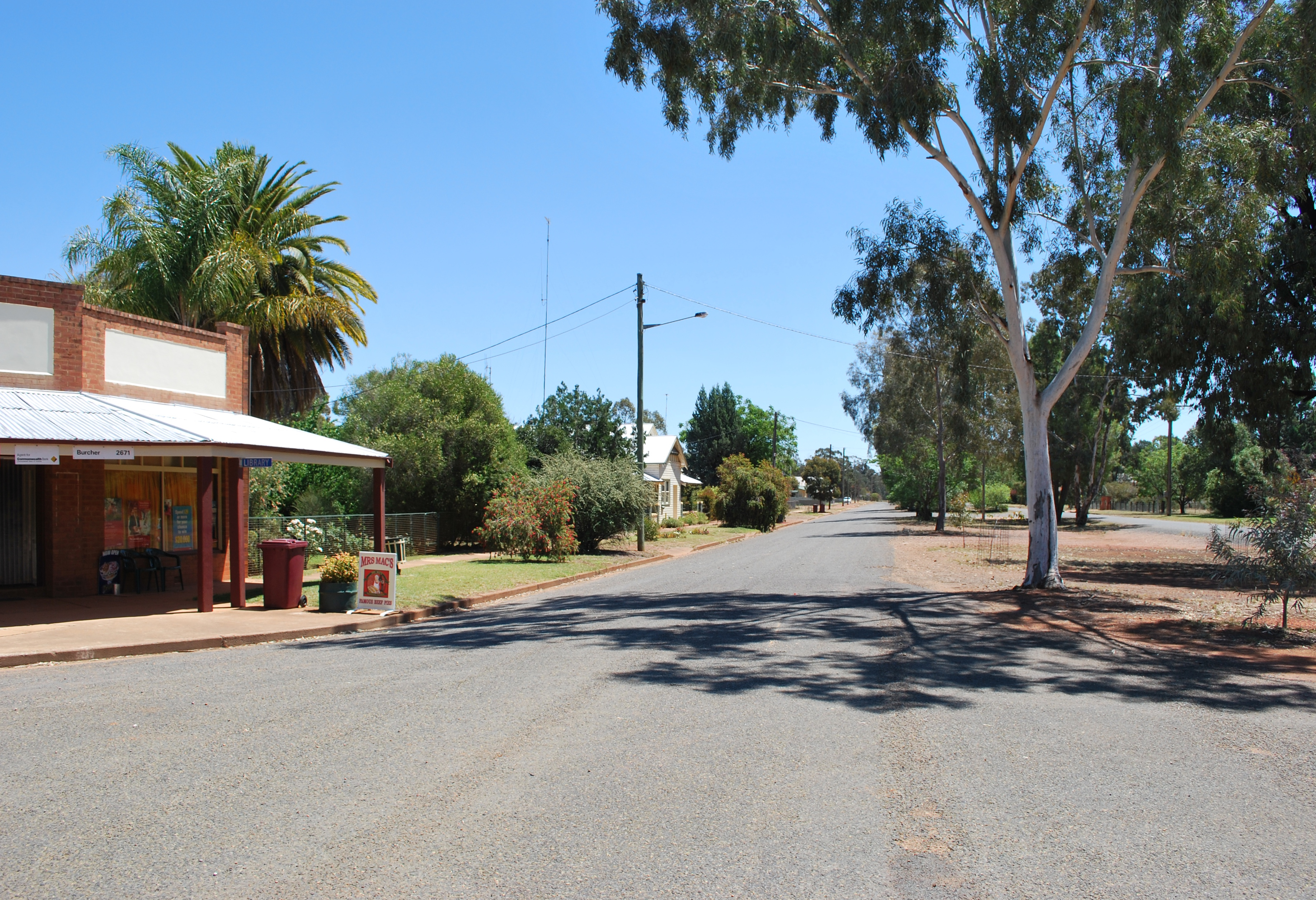
- Bena St, the main street of Burcher

- Coordinates: 33°31′S 147°15′E
- Country: Australia
- State: New South Wales
- LGA: Lachlan Shire
- Location: 479 km (298 mi) W of Sydney; 94 km (58 mi) WSW of Forbes; 54 km (34 mi) N of West Wyalong; 65 km (40 mi) S of Condobolin

Government
  - State electorate: Barwon
  - Federal division: Parkes

Population
  - Total: 185 (2006 census)
- Postcode: 2671

Burcher is a small rural village situated in central New South Wales, Australia, in Lachlan Shire. As of 2006, Burcher had a population of 185. Its main attractions include Lake Cowal, known for its diverse birdlife; and the Lake Cowal Gold Mine, an open cut mine situated south-east of Burcher.

The community of Burcher has two churches, a public school, a local hotel, and a corner store. Sporting facilities include a nine-hole golf course, a cricket field, and tennis courts. The school has closed and the school property is now in private ownership.

== Gallery ==
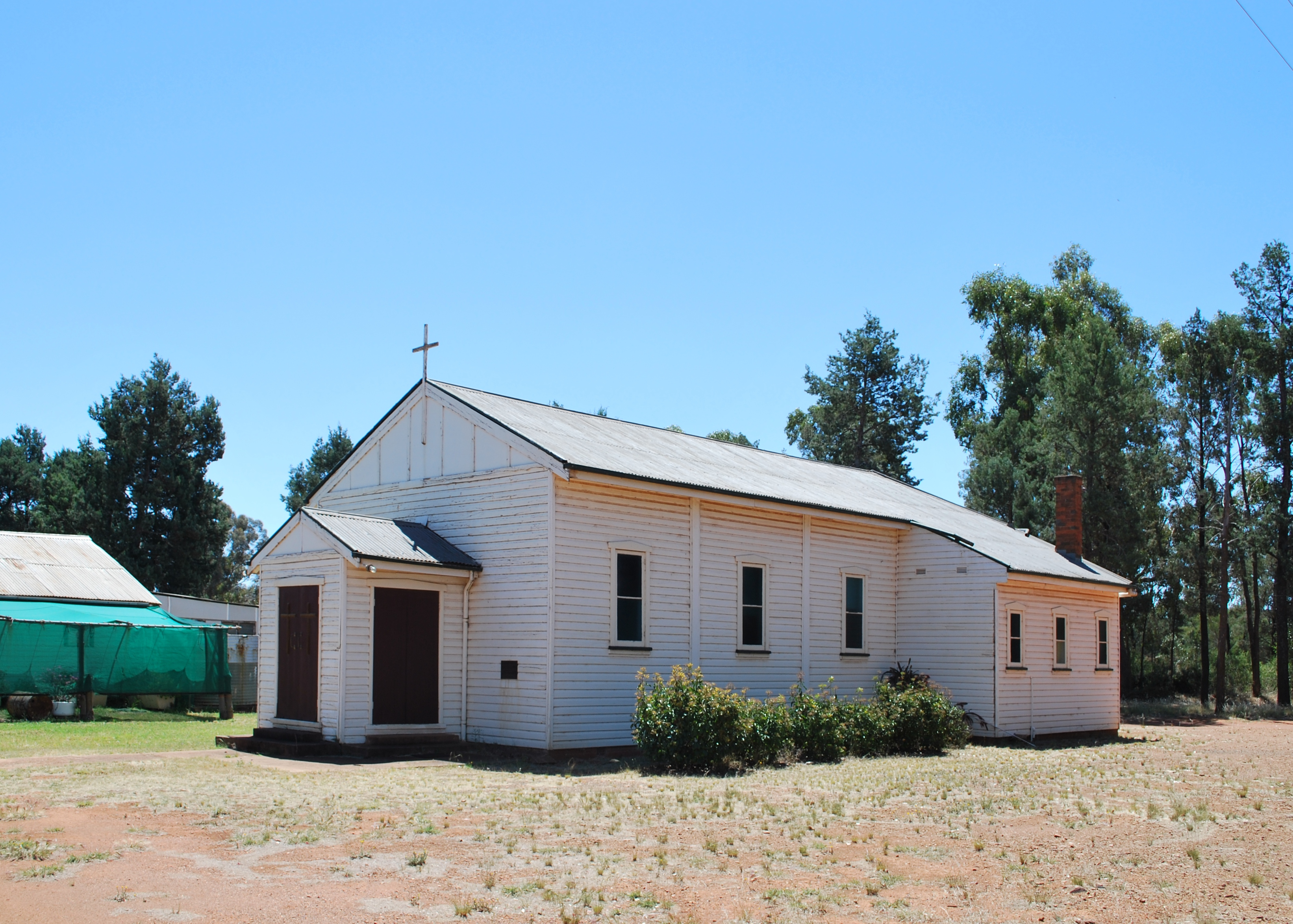
Burcher Roman Catholic Church

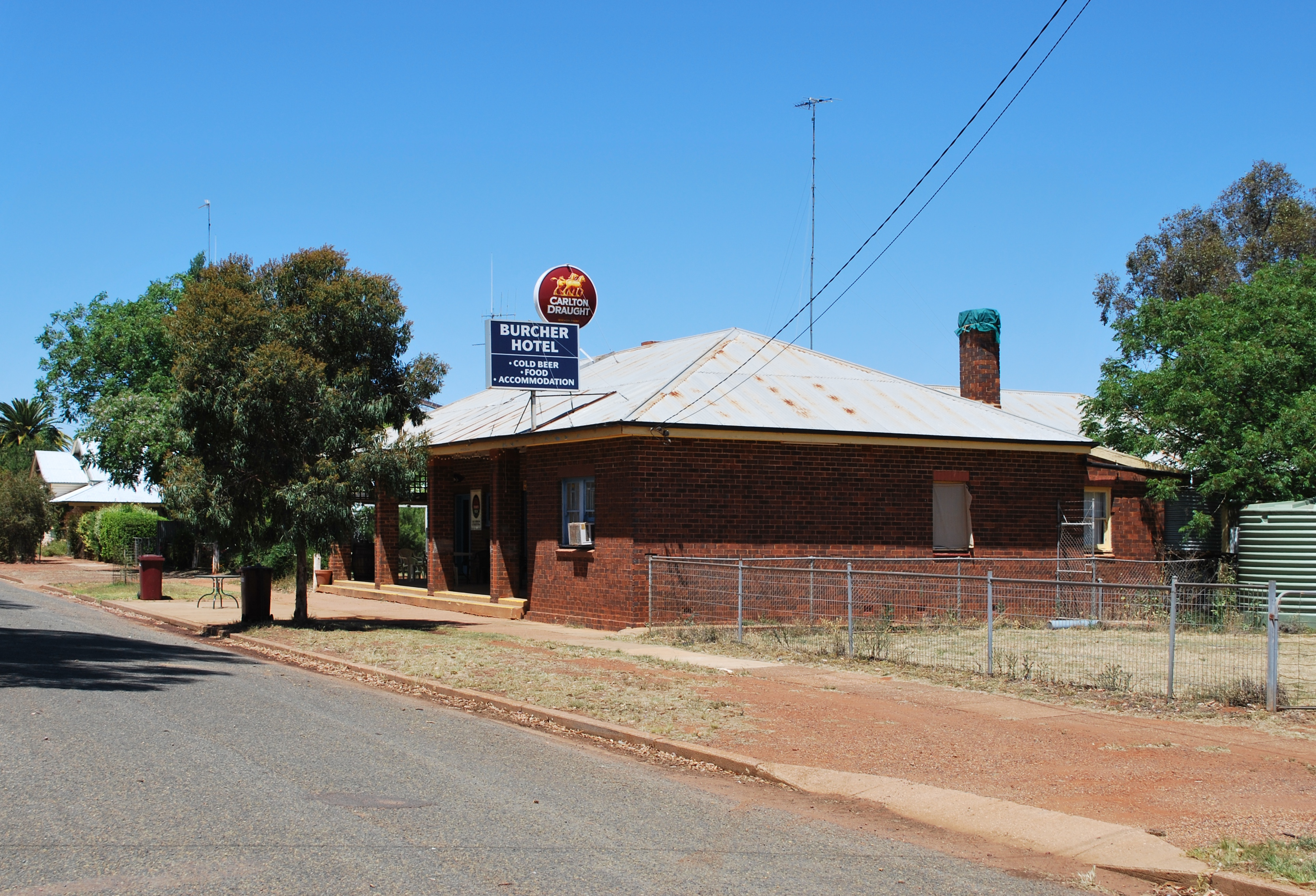
Burcher Hotel

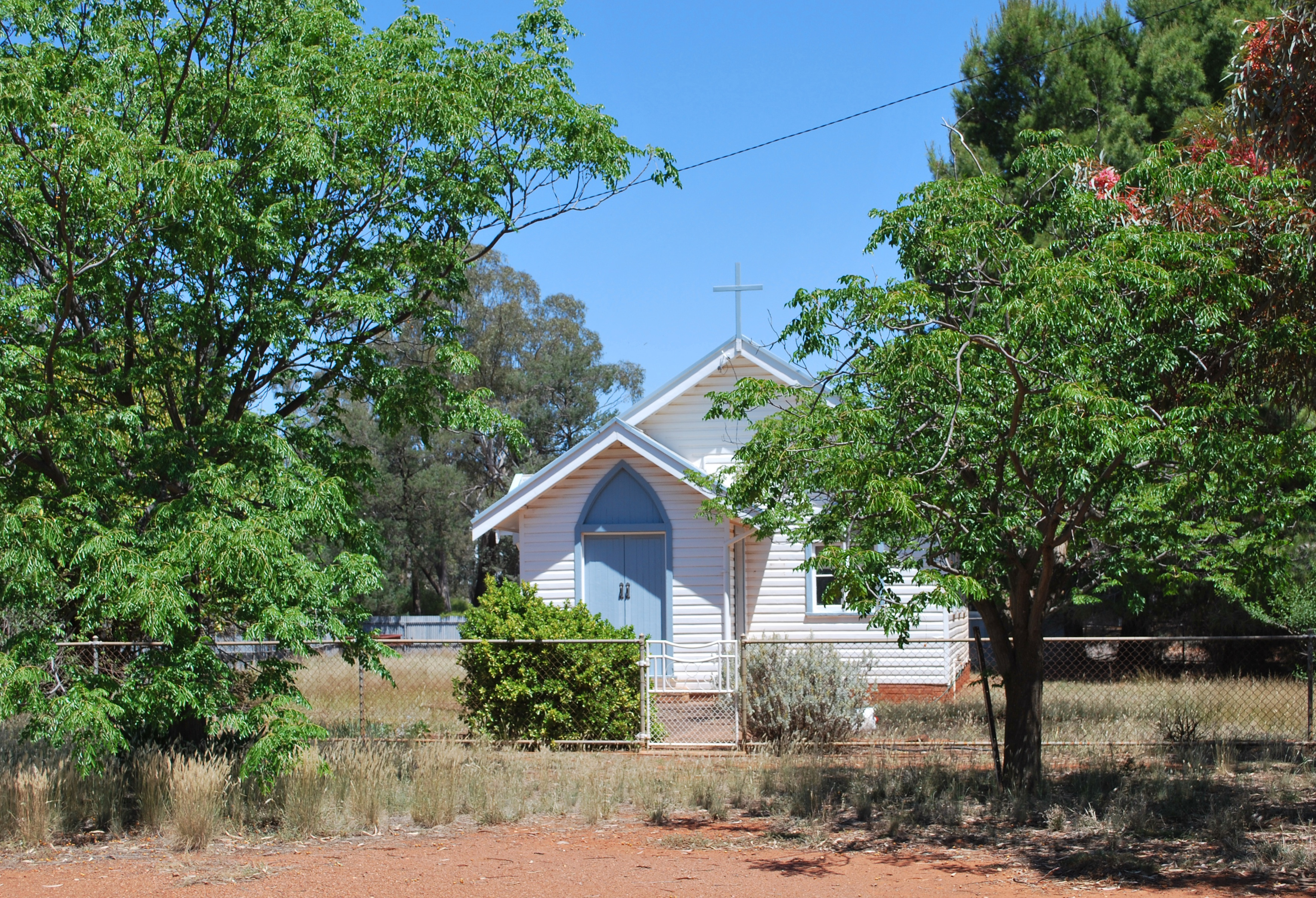
Burcher Anglican Church

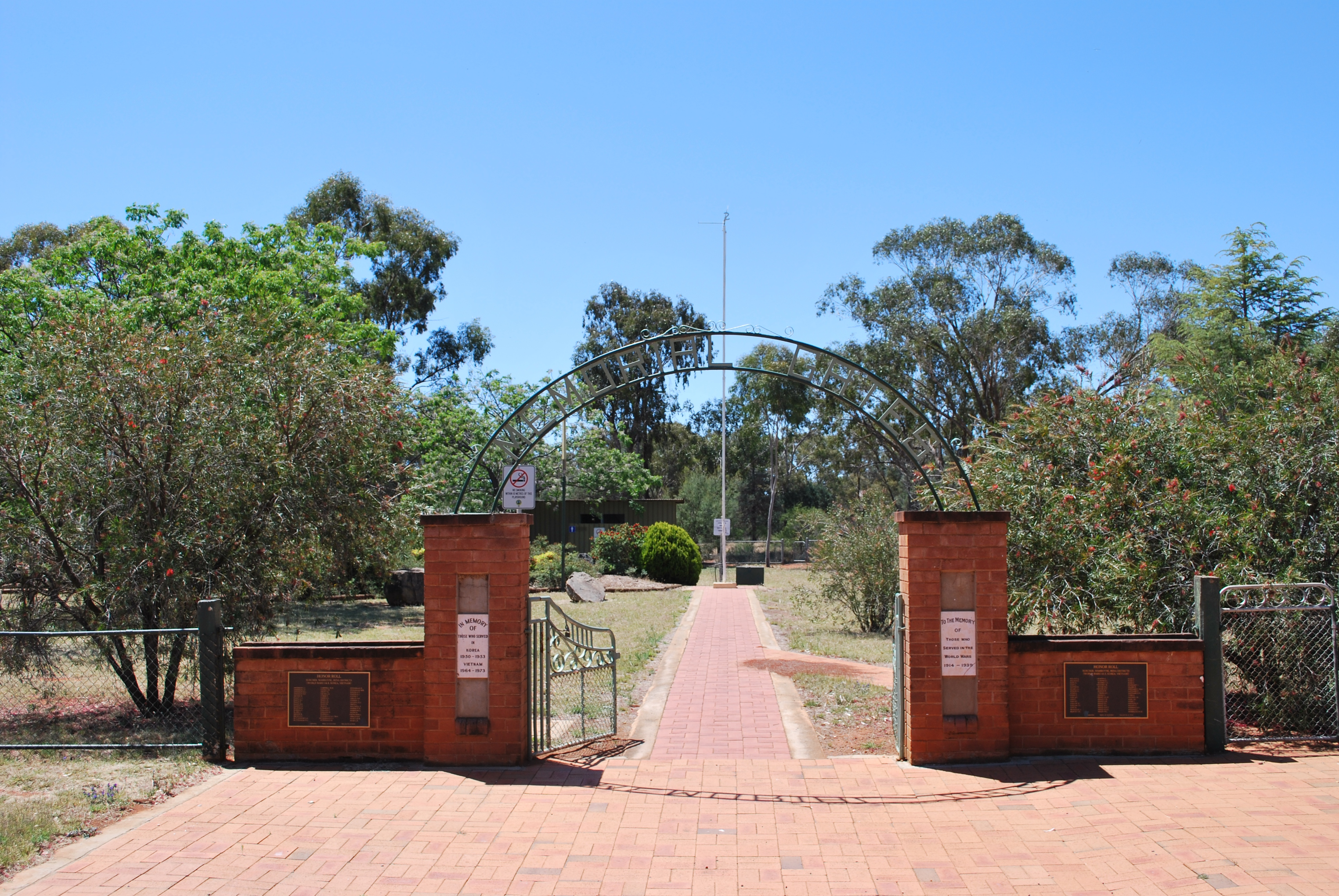
Burcher War Memorial

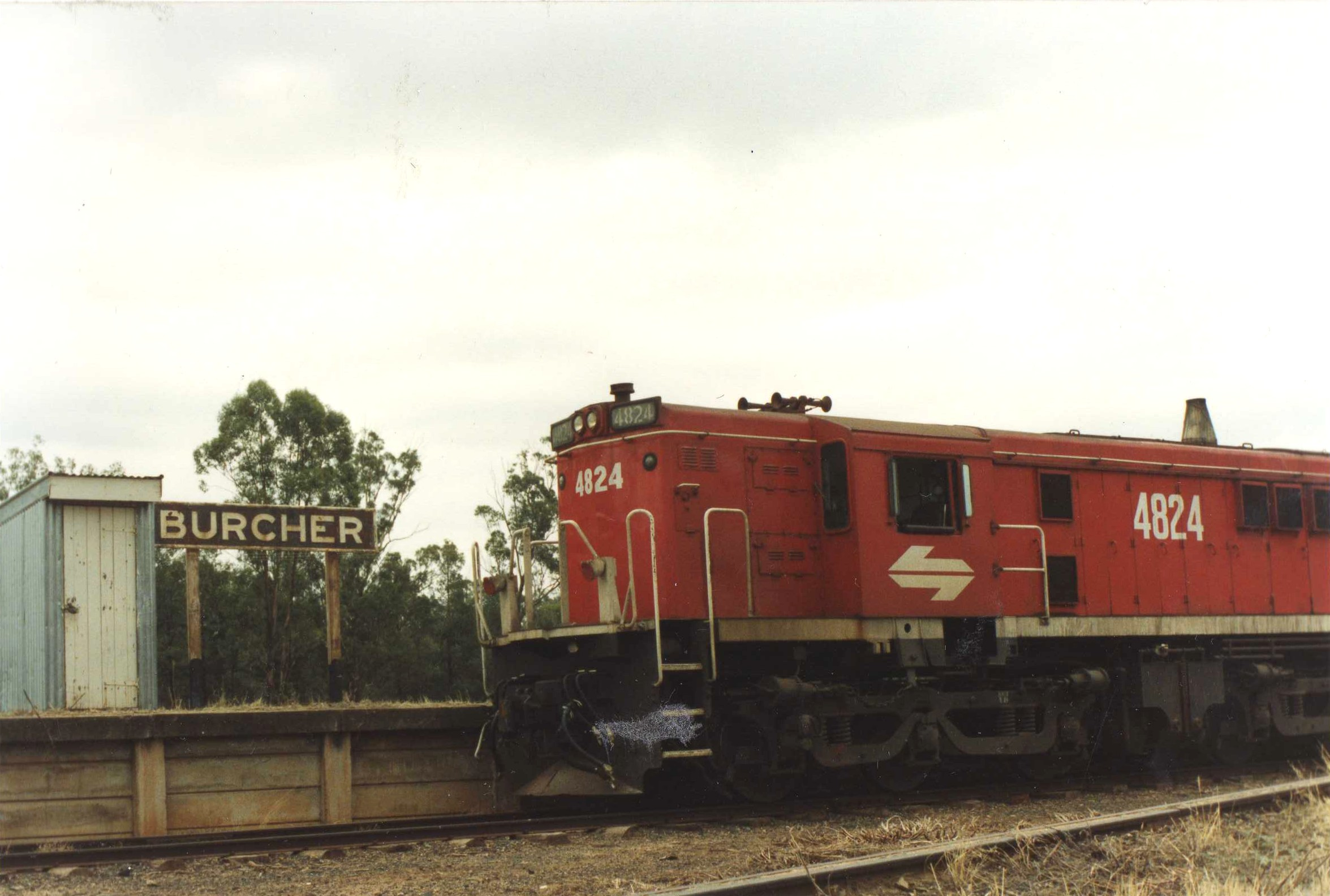
Burcher

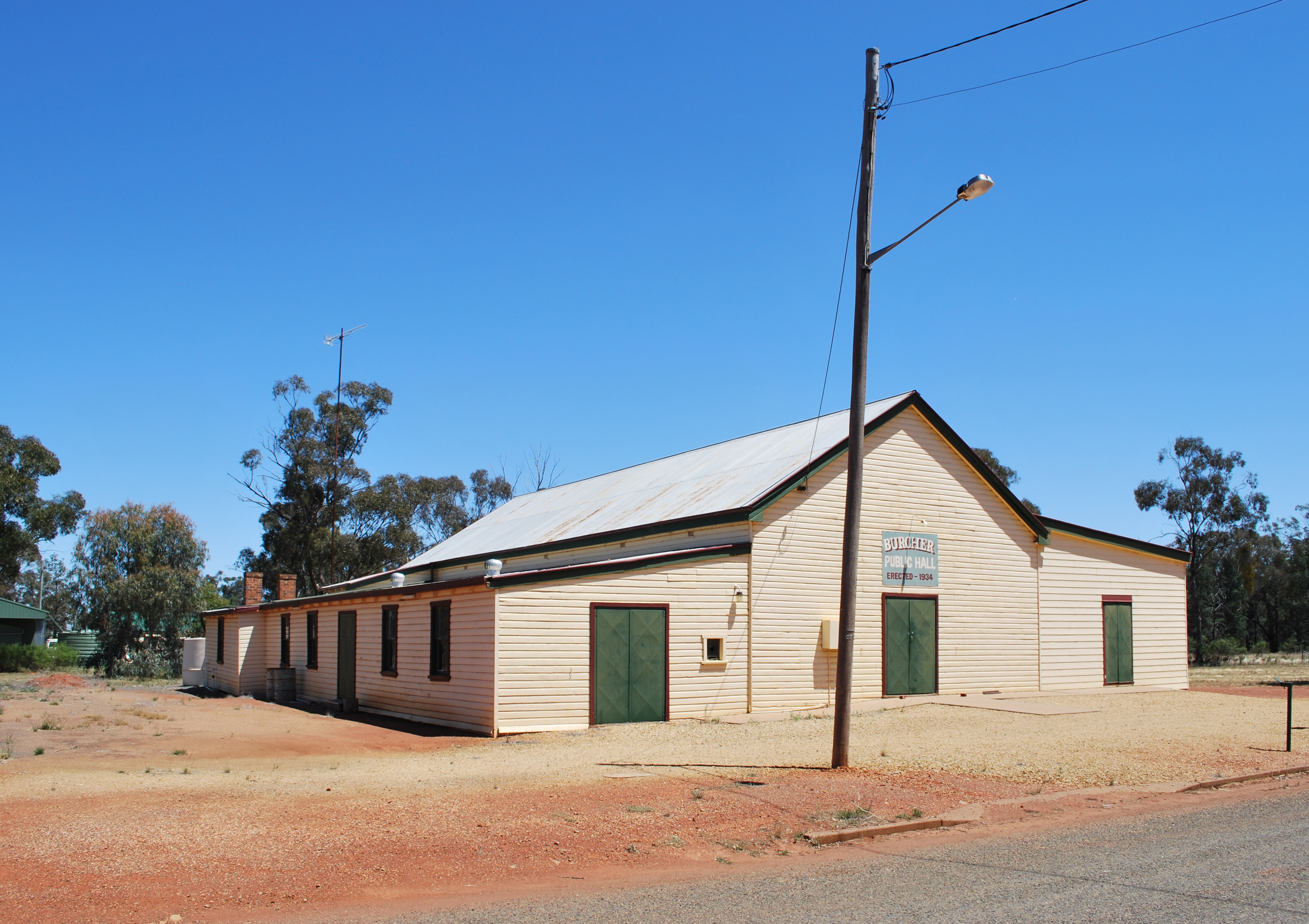
Burcher Hall
