= Parish of Willanbalang =

Willanbalang, New South Wales is a cadastral parish of Kennedy County New South Wales.

Willanbalang, New South Wales is between Nyngan and Albert, New South Wales.
