= Mount Tilga =

Hill in New South Wales, Australia

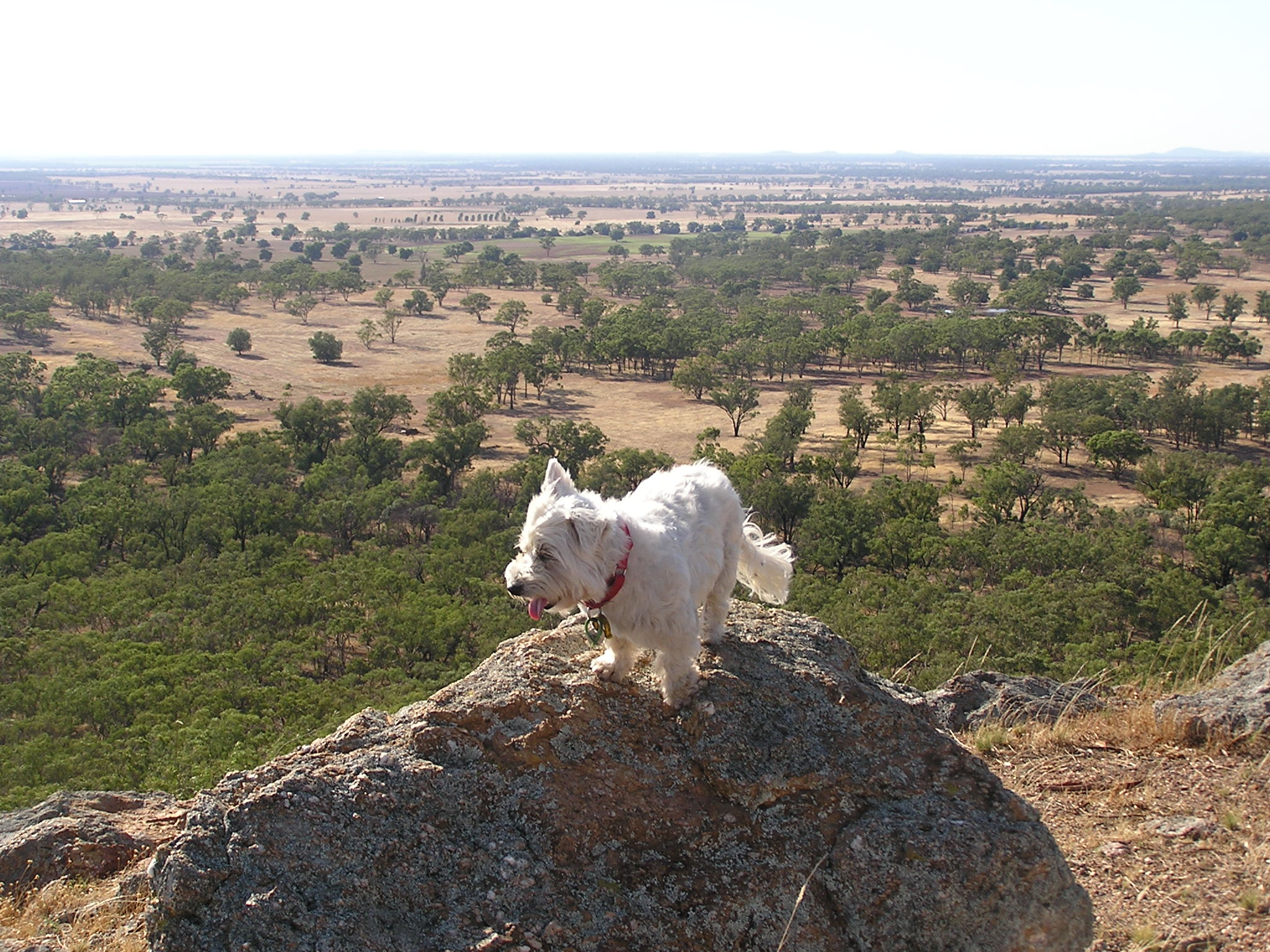
- View from the top of Mount Tilga

Highest point
- Elevation: 307 m (1,007 ft)
- Coordinates: 33°01′31″S 147°08′10″E

Geography
- Location within New South Wales
- Location: Condobolin, Central West region of New South Wales, Australia

Mount Tilga, a hill located near Condobolin in the Central West region of New South Wales, Australia, was said to be the exact centre of New South Wales.

However, establishing the centre of an irregular shape is not a straightforward matter. Just where the centre of the state lies is open to dispute. According to Geoscience Australia a possible centre for New South Wales is just off Cockies Road, 33 kilometres (21 mi) west-north-west of Tottenham, a small town 110 kilometres (68 mi) west of Dubbo. This spot, (32°09′48″S 147°01′00″E) south of the Fiveways Intersection, is marked by a cairn constructed for Australia's Bicentennial celebrations in 1988.

Mount Tilga is 307 metres (1,007 ft) above sea level and it rises sharply out of the plain, approximately 8 kilometres (5.0 mi) north of Condobolin.

== See also ==
- Derriwong, another candidate for "centre of New South Wales"
- List of mountains of Australia § New South Wales
