= Derriwong =

- Town
- Coordinates: 33°05′52″S 147°20′09″E
- Country: Australia
- State: New South Wales
- LGA: Lachlan Shire

Government
  - State electorate: Lachlan
  - Federal division: Parkes
- Elevation: 310 m (1,020 ft)

Population
  - Total: 38 (2016 census)
- Postcode: 2877

Derriwong is a rural locality in Cunningham County, one of the Lands administrative divisions of New South Wales, Australia.

In 2016 it had a population of 38.

It is also a station on the Sydney - Broken Hill railway line. Although mainly agricultural in character, the locality is notable as being the geographic centre of New South Wales, by one calculation.

== See also ==
- Mount Tilga
