= Parish of Hastings (Kennedy County) =

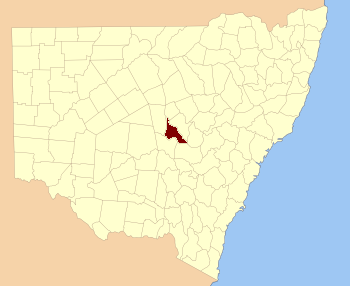
Kennedy County NSW.

Hastings Parish, New South Wales is a cadastral parish in Kennedy County New South Wales. The parish is on the Bogan River just outside the town of Albert, New South Wales, and is on the Tottenham Railway Line.

== History ==
The parish is on what was Wiradjuri traditional land, and today the area is primarily agricultural in nature. The Middlefeild railway station operated from 17 October 1916 to 25 January 1974.
