= Parish of Tabratong (Kennedy County) =

Tabratong located at 32°14′54″S 147°27′04″ is a cadastral parish of Kennedy County New South Wales.

The Parish is on the east of the town of Tottenham, New South Wales and is centered on the Minemoorong railway station which closed to passengers in November 1974 but remain open to freight. The Parish lies in a wheat-growing area.
