= Parish of Bentinck =

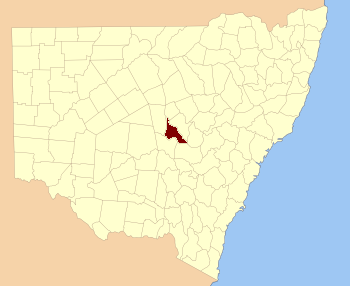
Kennedy County NSW.

Bentinck located at 32.2954°S 147.3704°E is a cadastral parish in Kennedy County New South Wales.

Bentinck Parish is rural land between Albert, New South Wales and Tullamore, New South Wales and is on what was Wiradjuri traditional land.
