= All Saints' Anglican Church, Condobolin =

All Saints' Anglican Church
- All Saints Anglican Church
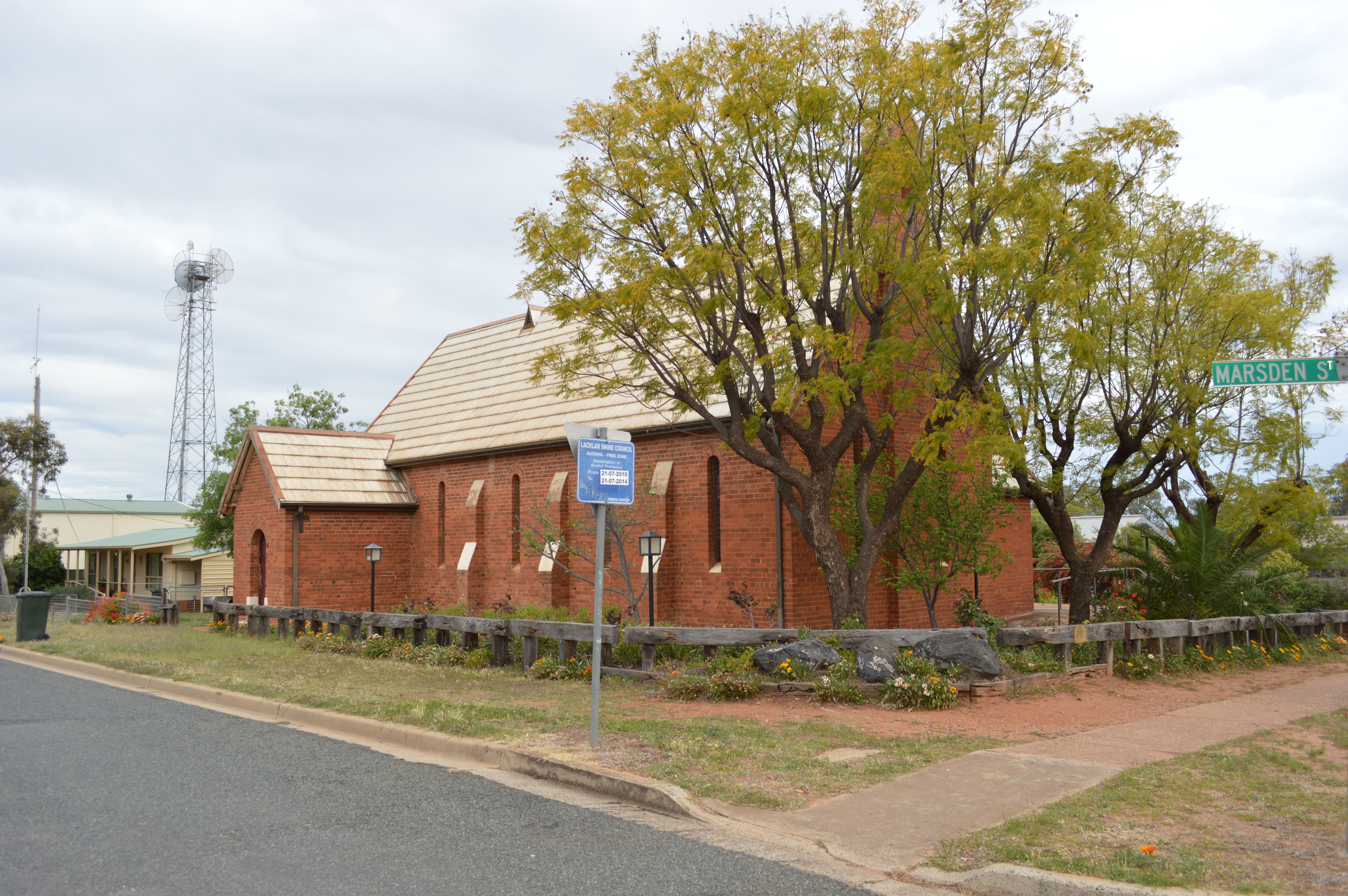

- Location within New South Wales
- 33°05′17″S 147°09′01″E
- Location: McDonnell Street, Condobolin, Lachlan Shire, New South Wales
- Country: Australia
- Denomination: Anglican
- Website: www.bathurstanglican.org.au/Parishes/Condobolin.html

History
- Status: Church
- Founded: 24 July 1878 by Bishop Samuel Marsden

Architecture
- Functional status: Complete
- Architect: Edmund Blacket (possibly)
- Architectural type: Victorian; Federation
- Years built: 1878–1879

Administration
- Diocese: Anglican Diocese of Bathurst

New South Wales Heritage Register
- Official name: All Saints Anglican Church; All Saints' Anglican Parish Church
- Type: State heritage (built)
- Designated: 2 May 2008
- Reference no.: 1787
- Type: Church
- Category: Religion
- Builders: Mr Brinsmead

The All Saints' Anglican Church is a heritage-listed Anglican church located at McDonnell Street, Condobolin in the Lachlan Shire local government area of New South Wales, Australia. The church was possibly designed by Edmund Blacket and was built from 1878 to 1879 by Mr Brinsmead. It is also known as All Saints Anglican Parish Church. The property is owned by the Anglican Diocese of Bathurst. It was added to the New South Wales State Heritage Register on 2 May 2008.

== History ==
=== Indigenous history ===
The Wiradjuri are an Aboriginal Australian group of people from central New South Wales. In the 21st century, major Wiradjuri groups live in Condobolin, Peak Hill, Narrandera and Griffith. There are significant populations at Wagga Wagga and Leeton, New South Wales and smaller groups at West Wyalong, Parkes, Forbes, Cootamundra and Young.

The Wiradjuri were the largest Aboriginal group in New South Wales. For tens of thousands of years they occupied a large area in central NSW, from the Blue Mountains in the east, to Hay in the west, north to Nyngan and south to Albury: the South Western slopes region:

The Wiradjuri are identified as a coherent group as they maintained a cycle of ceremonies that moved in a ring around the whole tribal area. This cycle led to tribal coherence despite the large occupied area. Occupation of the land by the Wiradjuri can be seen by carved trees and campsite remainders. Carved trees are more commonly found around the Macquarie and Lachlan rivers in the north rather than the Murrumbidgee in the south. Campsites, which indicate regular seasonal occupation by small groups, have been found on river flats, open land and by rivers.

Clashes between European settlers and Aboriginal people were very violent from 1821 to 1827, particularly around Bathurst, and have been termed the "Bathurst Wars". The loss of fishing grounds and significant sites and the killing of Aboriginal people was retaliated through attacks with spears on cattle and stockmen. In the 1850s there were still corroborees around Mudgee but there were fewer clashes. European settlement had taken hold and the Aboriginal population was in decline.

=== Settlement of Condobolin ===
The name Condobolin is suggested by some to have evolved from the Aboriginal word "Cundabullen" for shallow crossing. The crossing was located a short distance below the junction of the Lachlan River and the Goobang Creek. Others suggest that the town's name from the Wiradjuri word for "hop bush", or "hop brush".

The area was explored by John Oxley in 1817 and Thomas Mitchell in 1836. The "Condoublin" run was established by 1844 (Historical Towns Directory. Hallmark Editions: Australian Heritage Magazine). There had been squatters in the district since Mitchell's 1836 exploration. Closer settlement of the area began in 1880 when the large runs were broken up into smaller holdings.

The town of Condobolin was proclaimed in 1859. The railway arrived in 1898, and the town's population boomed, assisted by finds in 1885 of copper north of the town and in 1896 of gold in the district, north-west of the town. A major copper and gold mine was in operation at Condobolin from 1898 until around 1910. Agriculture is still a major influence on the town, production having expanded with the damming of the Lachlan River in 1935 by the Wyangala Dam. Wheat, barley, canola, wool, sheep and cattle are produced in the district. In more recent years irrigation has brought horticulture and cotton to the Lachlan River area.

=== Building history ===
The foundation stone of All Saints' Condobolin was laid on 24 July 1878 by Bishop Samuel Marsden, grandson of Samuel Marsden, the famous Anglican colonial priest. The first service in the new Church was conducted on 4 January 1880. Prior to construction of the church, it appears that services were initially held in the open air. In about 1872 services were held in the home of Mr Piercey, the Schoolmaster. Subsequently, services were held in the Courthouse until the new church was built. At this time priests would travel from Forbes to Condobolin to conduct the services.

The first Anglican priest resident in Condobolin was the Rev. G. Soare who was licensed to reside at the Naroonage. He resigned in 1876 and was succeeded by The Rev. Samuel Hart. In 1879 Rev. Hart resigned and in that same year the Parish of Condobolin was established. On 21 December the Rev. Henry Thomas Holliday was licensed as Assistant Minister, under the superintendency of the Rev. E. Dunstan (Rector of Forbes) and appointed to reside at Condobolin. He arrived in Condobolin just after the completion of All Saints' Church and conducted the first service on 4 January 1880.

The builder of the church was Mr Brinsmead. It was constructed from local bricks and was reputedly the first brick building in Condobolin. The roof was of ironbark shingles (which were later replaced by aluminium tiles) and the furniture was made from local timbers.

Although the records do not state the name of the architect, it is almost certain that it was built from a design by colonial architect Edmund Blacket. Plans of St Augustine's at Bulli (held by the Mitchell Library), designed by Blacket, as originally built before the addition of a sanctuary, are identical to that of All Saints', except that All Saints' has one less window on each side, plus buttresses on the exterior walls. The western walls, windows and bell towers are identical. All Saints' Condobolin is also similar to All Saints' Albion Park which was built of stone in the mid-1870s. It is possible that All Saints' Condobolin adapted a Blacket design that was in general use during the 1870s and 1880s. In her exhibition catalogue on Blacket, the Australian architectural historian Joan Kerr wrote: 'Condobolin Church is another typical rural design. The design has been attributed to Blacket and the style of the building makes this attribution convincing.'

It is thought that the bricks used were the first bricks produced by a Condobolin brickworks, using local clay, giving a characteristic red colouring to the church (the same local bricks were used for the Condobolin Catholic Church in the 1920s).

The windows are by Lyon, Cottier & Co, which created much of Australia's Victorian and Federation-period stained glass. They were the foremost stained glass manufacturers in Australia and became famous in domestic, commercial and ecclesiastical work. Lyon was the window designer and glass painter whilst Cottier kept the firm up to date with the latest overseas developments. Their company had an office in London and Sydney and Cottier also had a studio in New York. John Lamb Lyon won international and national awards for his work. A full set of original Lyon & Cottier windows of the quality of these are rare today.

No documentary evidence has been discovered that determines the exact date of the windows' manufacture. There are few Lyon and Cottier company records surviving. It is estimated that the windows at All Saints were made and installed in several stages between 1880 and the 1890s. More research into the biographical dates and details of the donors and memorial subjects could narrow down the dates of manufacture, i.e. memorial windows would have been installed after the death of the subject and donor windows during their lifetime.

The smaller geometric design of the east window and its importance above the altar suggests that this window was made and installed first, possibly by the time the first service was held. It is in keeping with early-to-mid nineteenth-century Gothic Revival desire to reproduce the smaller scale, "mosaic" quality of medieval windows. It includes smaller pieces of richly coloured glass, less painted details and greater prominence given to the lead lines. It is possible, though speculation only, that the west window was the last to be installed, due to the larger scale of its design, softer colouring, and more fluid, interlacing design, which is suggestive of Art Nouveau influences of the 1890s. All windows share the same borders. The west and nave windows share the small inscription lettering, and the vestry windows and the Richard Little memorial window (northern wall of the nave) share similar painted details and foliated designs. The use of common borders and painted quarries suggest the use of stock designs. Comparisons with other known Lyon and Cottier windows reveal the same painted quarries and design details. The windows are not really 'grisaille' but more accurately described as "geometric" or as quarry glass.

In the late 1920s new ecclesiastical furniture was added to the Church. The furniture is elaborately carved and made in a style called "tabernacle work". The pieces are two Bishop's Thrones, the Altar, Credence Table, Prayer Desk, Lectern and Font. The elaborately carved Font was displayed at the Brisbane Exhibition before being placed in the Church.

In 1940 the shingled roof was replaced by aluminium tiles which caused a sensation at the time, due to the glare caused when the sun shone on it.

In the 1960s cement pathways and surrounds were laid.

In 1978 all the windows were removed and sent to Sydney where they were repaired by Bolton Studios in Ashfield. Restoration involved re-leading the windows, adding false leads to cover cracks in the glass pieces, and some new painted glass pieces.

The church continues in its original use as a place of worship for the Anglican community of Condobolin.

== Description ==
In her exhibition catalogue on Edmund Thomas Blacket, Australian architectural historian Joan Kerr wrote:

[All Saints' is] ...built in brick, consisting of a five-bay nave of lancet windows with buttresses between each window, a north porch and south vestry. It has triple lancets at the east end with a circular rose window over them, and the west facade has a continuous buttress up the centre topped with a bell-cote and flanking lancet windows.'

— Joan Kerr.

Gothick-styled church built on sandstone foundations with 300mm walls and external buttresses. The construction is red brick, made locally. Internal walls are white plaster. Double pitched gabled roof, covered in pressed aluminium tiles (previously shingles, replaced in 1940). [Are shingles underneath?] The design of the original wooden pews are attributed to Blacket.

The stained glass windows within the church were produced by Lyon, Cottier & Co. It has been suggested they represent a style known as "Grissaille". However, Robin heddtich suggests that they are not really 'grisaille'but more accurately described as "geometric" or as quarry glass. The windows were restored in 1978.

In the late 1920s new ecclesiastical furniture was added to the Church. The furniture is elaborately carved and made in a style called "tabernacle work". The pieces include two Bishop's Thrones, the Altar, Credence Table, Prayer Desk, Lectern and Font. The elaborately carved Font was displayed at the Brisbane Exhibition before being placed in the Church.

All Saints' is historically associated with nearby buildings but none of these are included in this listing - the first Rectory on Marsden Street, which was sold in 1917, a new Rectory on the corner of Orange and McDonnell Streets completed in 1917, a new demountable Church House as well as the Church Hall behind the All Saints Church.

=== Condition ===
As at 23 March 2006, excellent/good.

=== Modifications and dates ===
- Stained glass windows were restored in 1978.
- Cement paths and surrounds were laid in the 1960s.
- Shingle roof was replaced with aluminium tiles c.1940.

=== Further information ===
Heritage Council Religious Properties Advisory Panel Statement of Significance 12 June 2007: no direct evidence for design of the church to Blacket has been found despite considerable research. However, there is substantial circumstantial evidence to collaborate very clearly that it was the work of this important 19th century church architect. The Blacket opus is principally known from the collection of maps and plans he left through his sons to the Mitchell Library and catalogued in Joan Kerr's publication. It is the case however, that not all Blacket's works are mentioned in this collection for instance the prominent house Jenner at Potts Point and not all plans in the collection are known to have been built.

=== Typological comparison ===
Condobolin is a small nave church, with no chancel, and entry through a north door with a bell surmounted to the west gable. In this form, it conforms completely to the small church type that Blacket developed for rural churches. The first of these was at Carcoar (1845-1849) to which was added later a tower and spire. Other early examples are Canterbury (1848), and Gosford (1857-1858). It is particularly like his contemporary church for St James Croydon (1884). It is usual for Blacket to have designed church furniture. The pews at Condobolin match almost exactly by those designed by Blacket for the first part of the church at Croydon 1884. Kerr herself is prepared to make the attribution a convincing one (page 21 of the above-mentioned monograph).

=== Personal ties with Blacket ===
Blacket is also known to have had direct personal ties with the district and those who would have been responsible for the commissioning of the church. He designed the rectory at Forbes in 1877. His daughter, Edith, married Harbury Clements of the Eugowra Station who attended the opening of the Forbes church. The trustees of the two churches, Condobolin and Forbes, were known to each other. Mathew Bolton of Condobolin married the daughter of Josiah Strickland, trustee of Forbes. The Blacket family went on to do other works in the district. Arthur Blacket designed water works in Forbes in 1880. Cyril Blacket designed the rectory at Forbes.

=== Intactness ===
Blacket built about 34 small churches of this kind according to the known information. Almost all of them have had additions made subsequently: Porches, towers, and chancel. From our survey of the churches, only Condobolin church is known to have survived in its original configuration.

=== Significance ===
The isolated rural setting known from the research conducted by Noelene Morris demonstrates well the success of Blacket and his clients in getting architectural results in remote rural NSW. It is a plain simple church designed with discipline by a leading Victorian architect of prodigious experience in many kinds of buildings. It is among the most intact of his small church type. For these reasons, it is of state significance

== Heritage listing ==
As at 13 December 2007, All Saints' Anglican Church was of State significance for its aesthetic, rarity and representative values in exemplifying the qualities of a small and relatively intact Gothic-styled church attributed to Edmund Blacket. It is understood that Blacket built about 34 small churches of this kind but almost all have had additions such as porches, towers, and chancel. This is the only church known to have survived in its original configuration. It is also rare for being a regional church with a full set of Lyon & Cottier windows. Also adding to its significance is the moveable heritage of the interiors, both the pews (believed to have been designed by Blacket), and the elaborate ecclesiastical furniture carved in the 1920s in a style called "tabernacle work".

All Saints' Anglican Church is of local heritage significance for its long-term and continuing role in the establishment and practice of the Anglican Christian faith in Condobolin. While of local social significance for its associations with the Condobolin Anglican congregation, it is also valued by the wider community for its associations with religious development of the town and the early establishment of facilities within the region. The exterior appearance of the church and its setting is aesthetically pleasing and it is a local landmark within the town of Condobolin.

All Saints' Anglican Church was listed on the New South Wales State Heritage Register on 2 May 2008 having satisfied the following criteria.

The place is important in demonstrating the course, or pattern, of cultural or natural history in New South Wales.

All Saints' Anglican Church is of local heritage significance for its long-term and continuing role in the establishment and practice of the Anglican Christian faith in the Condobolin district.

The place has a strong or special association with a person, or group of persons, of importance of cultural or natural history of New South Wales's history.

All Saints' Anglican Church is of local heritage significance for its associations with colonial figures such as Samuel Marsden, Edmund Blacket and John Lamb Lyon.

The place is important in demonstrating aesthetic characteristics and/or a high degree of creative or technical achievement in New South Wales.

All Saints' Anglican Church is of State significance for its aesthetic values in exemplifying the qualities of a small and relatively intact Gothick-styled church attributed to Edmund Thomas Blacket. It has original pews, also attributed to Blacket, and a fine collection of stained glass windows designed by John Lamb Lyon of Lyon, Cottier & Co. Also adding to the significance of the interiors is the moveable heritage of the 1920s ecclesiastical furniture, elaborately carved in a style called "tabernacle work". The exterior appearance of the church and its setting is aesthetically pleasing and it is a local landmark within the town of Condobolin.

The place has a strong or special association with a particular community or cultural group in New South Wales for social, cultural or spiritual reasons.

All Saints' Anglican Church is of local social significance for its associations with the Condobolin Anglican congregation. It is also valued by the wider community for its associations with religious development of the town and the early establishment of facilities within the region.

The place has potential to yield information that will contribute to an understanding of the cultural or natural history of New South Wales.

All Saints' Anglican Church is of local significance for its research potential to yield further information in respect of its design and construction, and for studies of the stained glass work of Lyon, Cottier & Co.

The place possesses uncommon, rare or endangered aspects of the cultural or natural history of New South Wales.

All Saints' Condoboline is of State significance for its rarity as an intact example of a small Gothic church attributed to Edmund Blacett. It is understood that Blacket built about 34 small churches of this kind but almost all have had additions such as porches, towers, and chancel. This is the only church is known to have survived in its original configuration. It is also rare for being a regional church with a full set of Lyon & Cottier windows. The only other known examples of regional churches in NSW with comparable sets of Lyon & Cottier windows are: St Patrick's Catholic Church, Boorowa; Anglican Church of the Resurrection, Jamberoo; St Mary's Catholic Church, Mudgee.

The place is important in demonstrating the principal characteristics of a class of cultural or natural places/environments in New South Wales.

All Saints' Condobolin is of State significance as an intact and regional representative example of the small Gothic church style attributed to Blacket.

== See also ==
- Anglican Diocese of Riverina
- Australian non-residential architectural styles
