= Parish of Genanaguy =

Cadastral parish in Kennedy County, New South, Wales, Australia

Coordinates: 32°41′54″S 148°05′04″E

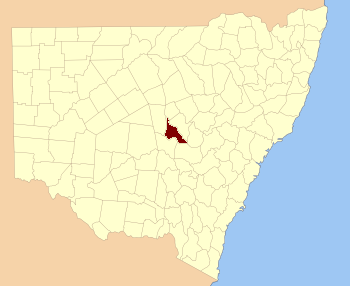
Kennedy County, New South Wales

Genanaguy is a cadastral parish of Kennedy County, New South Wales, Australia.
