= Don Athaldo =

Australian strongman

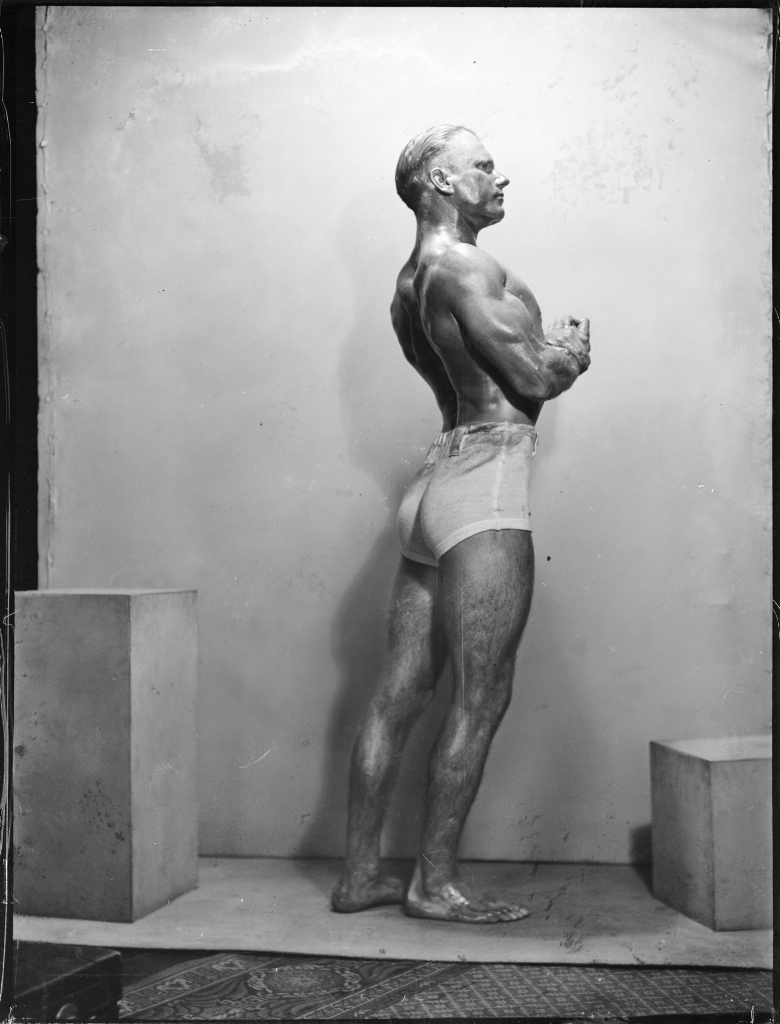

Don Athaldo (26 November 1894 – 24 May 1965) was a strongman.

== Biography ==
He was born as Walter Joseph Lyons on 26 November 1894 in Condobolin, New South Wales to Frederick Horace George Lyons and Elizabeth Power. Elizabeth died of tuberculosis after his birth. He was a sickly child and later saw the strongman Dr. Gordon at Fitzgerald Bros' Circus, read about ancient Greece and built himself up by taking physical culture courses by correspondence.

In the 1920s he published Health, Strength & Muscular Power; followed by a sequel, Meet Don Athaldo.
