= Parish of Euchabil =

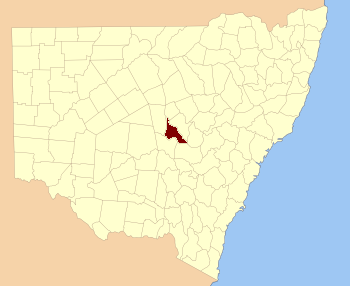
Kennedy County NSW.

Euchabil located at 32°40′54″S 147°52′04″ between Peak Hill, New South Wales and Tullamore, New South Wales is a cadastral parish of Kennedy County New South Wales.

The area is predominantly agricultural.
