= William Henry John Slee =

Australian geologist

Slee in 1889

William Henry John Slee, FGS (1836–1907), was an Australian geologist, mines inspector, and mining warden.

== Origins and early life ==
More usually known as W.H.J. Slee, or sometimes John Slee, he was born Wilhelm Heinrich Johann Slee on 3 May 1836 at Rostock, Mecklenburg-Western Pomerania, Germany, a son of Jacob and Regina Slee. There is uncertainty about his educational background, although he was highly articulate in both German and English. As a teenager he became a seaman. Aged 19, he sailed into Melbourne, on 20 December 1855 aboard the Chilean brig Pedro V from Valparaíso via Tahiti.

== Gold miner (and the Henry Lawson connection) ==
Along with a Norwegian shipmate, Neils Hertzberg Larsen, who Anglicised his name to Peter Lawson, he left ship there, attracted to the Ballarat gold rush. The two partners led a knockabout miners' life over the next decade, lured around to new goldfields, but without much result.

Eventually Slee and Lawson made their way to NSW, mining first at Lambing Flat, then at New Pipeclay (now Eurunderee, New South Wales). In 1866 Lawson married there, his first son, Henry Lawson, novelist and poet, being born the following year at Grenfell. Slee had earlier moved on to the new goldfield at Grenfell, writing Lawson to join him, where their quartz reef mining claim, named 'The Result', was also unrewarding. In 1869 Slee married at Grenfell to Emma Nelson, daughter of John Luke Gore and Mary Ann Nelson, of English and Irish origin.

W.H.J. Slee first came to public notice during his years at Grenfell. In 1870 he was active in agitations to promote mining development by obtaining government rewards for discoverers of new goldfields. He became so favourably well known that in September 1872 he was appointed manager of a goldmine at Emu Creek. With that, the partnership between Slee and Lawson was dissolved. In 1873 the Lawson family returned to Pipeclay, while the Slee family remained in Grenfell. Four children were born into the Slee family between 1870 and 1876, one of which died in 1873.

== Appointed first Inspector of Mines for NSW ==
Government inspection of coal mining in NSW had commenced in 1854, but other mining activity had been mostly unregulated. Large numbers of inexperienced people flocked to the gold diggings to try their luck, many using mining methods which were unsafe or impractical. The increased mining activity and a general dissatisfaction with the administration of mining led to the Mining Act, 1874 and the establishment of the Department of Mines on 1 May 1874. That same date, W.H.J. Slee was appointed the first Inspector of Mines for NSW, being responsible for industrial safety and enforcing mining safety codes.

For the next 14 years Slee was the only officer in the department filling that position. In 1876 Slee reported, "The [mining] regulations ensure safety to the health and life of the working miner; they strengthen the hands of the mining manager against the false economy of the directors; they protect the shareholder, in having his mine kept in a secure state for future development; and they compel tributers to keep the mine under their charge in a secure and workable state."

W.H.J. Slee approached the task by adroitly balancing the competing perspectives of mine managers, investors, and practical miners. Active in the field, on the surface and underground, he visited mining operations all about NSW, producing individual geological reports and annual mining activity reports of such value that they were reproduced in newspapers as a matter of course. As part of this role he proclaimed and named new mining fields. Apart from assessing mining prospects, he adjudicated in disputes and investigated mining accidents and disasters.

== Field operations as mining warden ==
Slee used the gold mining town of Hill End as his headquarters in 1880, his annual report revealing that in one year alone he had travelled more than 6,000 miles (9,600 km) by horse and buggy throughout New South Wales and had inspected 52 tin mines, eight copper mines, and 197 quartz and 116 alluvial gold mines.

When in 1880 the Milparinka, Mount Browne, and Tibooburra goldfields, known as the Albert Goldfield, opened up in remote western NSW, he was appointed Goldfields Warden and Mines Inspector, spending several years there, appointing assistant warden's clerks to the new mines at Silverton region, at the conclusion of which the people of these districts subscribed to present him with a gold watch and address in appreciation of his services. The Linnean Society of NSW published his observations on Aboriginal customs in that region.

With increased use of diamond drills for mineral exploration and sourcing artesian water, he gained such expertise that in 1885 he was also appointed NSW Superintendent of Diamond Drills, a program that under his guidance made valuable developments, particularly as to engineering and public health. On 5 December 1888 he was elected a Fellow of the Geological Society, London.

Mining accidents had decreased markedly as a result of his efforts, but there were still many tragedies, the worst being the Bulli coal mine disaster of 1887 that killed 81 men and boys. All through the mid-1880s an annual average of ten men died in New South Wales mines. Slee's 1888 annual report mentions twelve fatalities, eight in silver mining, two in gold mining, one each in copper mining and tin mining.

== Appointed first Chief Inspector of Mines, NSW ==
In 1890 he was appointed Chief Inspector of Mines for NSW, based in Sydney, with a staff that grew to nine mining inspectors. By now he was a Justice of the Peace, as well as a member of the Prospecting Board. On 1 June 1896 he was additionally appointed Mining Warden for the entire colony of New South Wales, the first such appointment. Commencing that same year, 1896, he actively advised and assisted several geological expeditions of The Royal Society that had been appointed to investigate coral reef structures by boring at Funafuti atoll.

== Death and legacies ==
In 1899 newspapers reported that W.H.J. Slee was ill at his Sydney home suffering from chronic bronchitis. In August 1903, after 28 years of public service to the NSW mining industry, he was granted leave of absence so as to retire in August 1904. W.H.J. Slee died at his home at Turramurra, on Sydney's North Shore, on 10 April 1907, aged 71. His wife, Emma, died in 1929 in Manly. His major published works include Mineral Deposits, etc., in New South Wales, 1896. His numerous published reports on mining districts and the principal mines throughout NSW now form an important part of the historical record of those districts. Slee Street in Wyalong, Slee Street in Fifield, and Slee Street, in the now ghost town of Bobadah, are named after him.
