= Parish of Tanilogo =

Tanilogo, New South Wales, is a cadastral parish of Kennedy County New South Wales.
