= Parish of Belardery =

Cadastral parish in Kennedy County New South Wales

Coordinates: 32°46′54″S 148°00′04″E

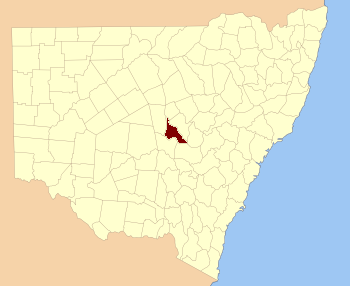
Kennedy County NSW.

Belardery is a cadastral parish in Kennedy County, New South Wales.
