= Parish of Burdenda =

Burdenda, New South Wales is a cadastral parish in Kennedy County New South Wales.

The Parish is mainly agricultural land between Tullamore, New South Wales and Peak Hill, New South Wales.
