= Parish of Gobondry =

Cadastral parish in New South Wales

Gobondry is a cadastral parish of Kennedy County.
