= Kennedy County =

Kennedy New South Wales
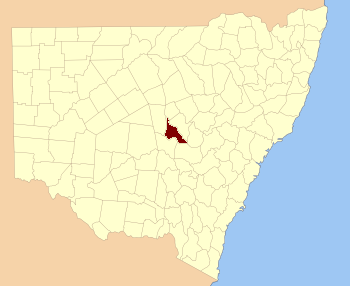
- Location in New South Wales
Lands administrative divisions around Kennedy:
Flinders	Oxley	Narromine
Flinders	Kennedy	Gordon
Cunningham	Cunningham	Ashburnham

Kennedy County is one of the 141 cadastral divisions of New South Wales. It is located to the west of the Bogan River in the area around Tottenham and Tullamore.

Kennedy County was named in honour of the explorer Edmund Besley Court Kennedy (1818–1848).

== Parishes within this county ==
A full list of parishes found within this county; their current LGA and mapping coordinates to the approximate centre of each location is as follows:

Parish	LGA	Coordinates
Albert	Lachlan Shire	32°24′54″S 147°30′04″E
Babathnil	Lachlan Shire	32°31′54″S 147°26′04″E
Beaconsfield	Lachlan Shire	32°14′54″S 147°21′04″E
Belardery	Parkes Shire	32°46′54″S 148°00′04″E
Bentinck	Parkes Shire	32°29′54″S 147°37′04″E
Beugamel	Parkes Shire	32°39′54″S 147°47′04″E
Boona	Lachlan Shire	32°37′54″S 147°12′04″E
Braalghy	Lachlan Shire	32°34′54″S 147°18′04″E
Bulbodney	Lachlan Shire	32°29′54″S 147°15′04″E
Burdenda	Lachlan Shire	32°01′54″S 147°20′04″E
Burra	Lachlan Shire	32°42′54″S 147°24′04″E
Burrill	Parkes Shire	32°48′54″S 148°13′04″E
Carolina	Lachlan Shire	32°09′54″S 147°26′04″E
Cavendish	Lachlan Shire	32°25′54″S 143°32′04″E
Cookopie	Parkes Shire	32°44′54″S 148°08′04″E
Coradgery West	Parkes Shire	32°52′54″S 147°52′04″E
Coradgery	Parkes Shire	32°48′54″S 148°00′04″E
Dandaloo	Lachlan Shire	32°14′54″S 147°30′04″E
Davison	Parkes Shire	32°59′54″S 148°11′04″E
Derribong	Lachlan Shire	32°19′54″S 147°38′04″E
Euchabil	Parkes Shire	32°40′54″S 147°52′04″E
Fitzroy	Lachlan Shire	32°40′54″S 147°28′04″E
Genanaguy	Parkes Shire	32°41′54″S 148°05′04″E
Genaren	Parkes Shire	32°34′54″S 147°49′04″E
Gillenbine	Lachlan Shire	32°43′54″S 147°29′04″E
Gobondry	Parkes Shire	32°45′54″S 147°34′04″E
Graddle	Parkes Shire	32°28′54″S 147°55′04″E
Hartington	Lachlan Shire	32°22′54″S 147°14′04″E
Hastings	Parkes Shire	32°24′54″S 147°39′04″E
Hawarden	Lachlan Shire	32°23′54″S 147°21′04″E
Houston	Parkes Shire	32°56′54″S 148°18′04″E
Kadina	Parkes Shire	32°52′54″S 148°18′04″E
Limestone	Parkes Shire	32°59′54″S 148°03′04″E
Merilba	Bogan Shire	32°00′54″S 147°15′04″E
Meryula	Lachlan Shire	32°14′54″S 147°16′04″E
Mickibri	Parkes Shire	32°52′54″S 148°11′04″E
Mickimill	Lachlan Shire	32°38′54″S 147°24′04″E
Mingelo	Lachlan Shire	32°07′54″S 147°15′04″E
Mingerong	Parkes Shire	32°41′54″S 148°00′04″E
Moodana South	Lachlan Shire	32°10′54″S 147°19′04″E
Moodana	Lachlan Shire	32°06′54″S 147°21′04″E
Mungerie	Parkes Shire	32°36′54″S 148°02′04″E
Ormonde	Parkes Shire	32°29′54″S 147°43′04″E
Ossory	Parkes Shire	32°26′54″S 147°44′04″E
Redcliffe	Parkes Shire	32°45′54″S 147°41′04″E
Russell	Parkes Shire	32°36′54″S 147°43′04″E
Salisbury	Parkes Shire	32°46′54″S 147°44′04″E
Sarsfield	Lachlan Shire	32°33′54″S 147°24′04″E
Somerset	Lachlan Shire	32°37′54″S 147°29′04″E
Stanley	Parkes Shire	32°37′54″S 147°37′04″E
Strahorn	Parkes Shire	32°35′54″S 147°56′04″E
Tabratong	Lachlan Shire	32°14′54″S 147°27′04″E
Talingaboolba	Lachlan Shire	32°32′54″S 147°02′04″E
Tanilogo	Parkes Shire	32°47′54″S 147°52′04″E
Tout	Lachlan Shire	32°43′54″S 147°25′04″E
Wellwood	Parkes Shire	32°27′54″S 147°38′04″E
Weridgery	Parkes Shire	32°59′54″S 148°02′04″E
Willanbalang	Parkes Shire	32°27′54″S 147°50′04″E
Wilmatha	Lachlan Shire	32°32′54″S 147°08′04″E
Wombin	Parkes Shire	32°50′54″S 148°03′04″E
Yralla	Lachlan Shire	32°29′54″S 147°32′04″E
