= Parish of Beugamel =

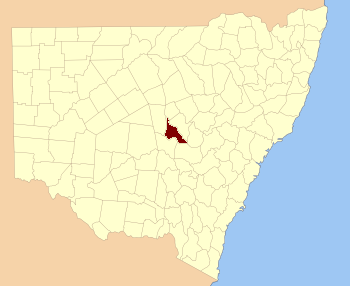
Kennedy County NSW.

Beugamel located at 32°39′54″S 147°47′04″ is a cadastral parish in Kennedy County New South Wales.
