= Parish of Burra (Kennedy County) =

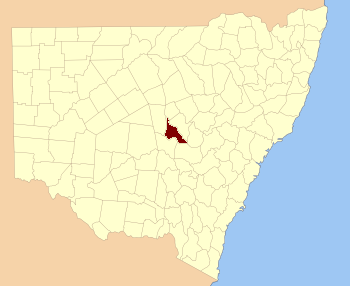
Kennedy County NSW.

Burra Parish located at 32.715000°S 147.401111°E is a cadastral parish in Kennedy County New South Wales.

Burra Parish is located between Fifield and Tullamore, New South Wales.
