= Parish of Babathnil =

Parish in Kennedy County, New South Wales

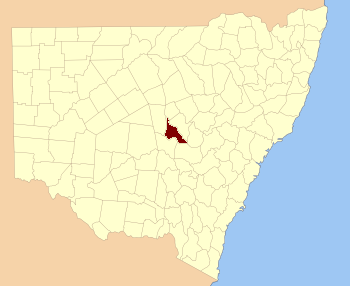
Kennedy County NSW.

Babathnil located at 32°31′54″S 147°26′04″ is a cadastral parish in Kennedy County New South Wales.
