= Lake Cowal =

Lake in New South Wales, Australia

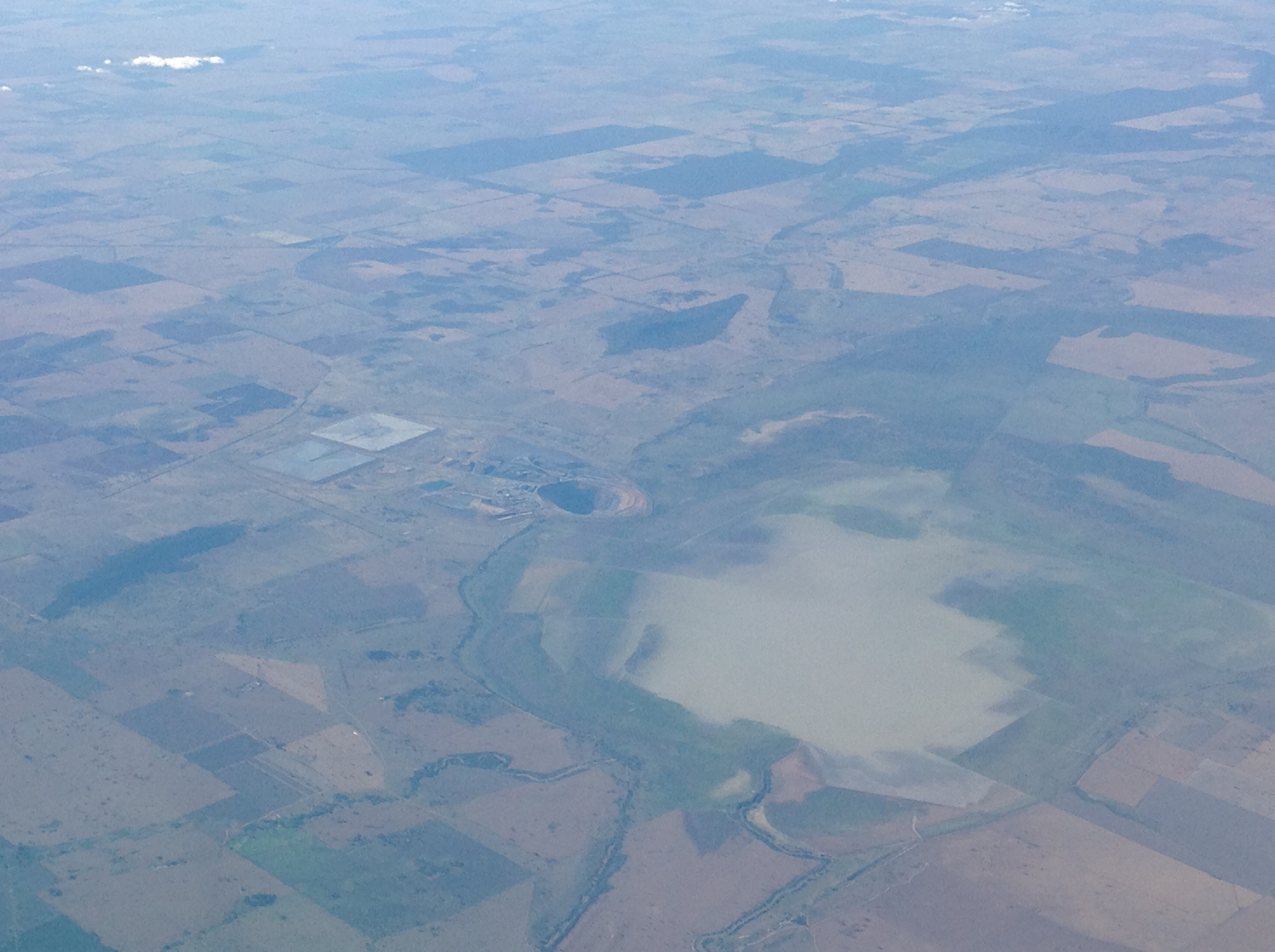
- Lake Cowal from the air

- Location within New South Wales
- Location: New South Wales
- Coordinates: 33°35′S 147°25′E
- Type: ephemeral
- Primary inflows: Bland Creek, Lachlan River
- Basin countries: Australia

Lake Cowal is the largest inland lake in New South Wales, Australia. The lake is ephemeral, being fed by the small Bland Creek and by the occasional flooding of the Lachlan River. Despite this, it retains a considerable amount of water in about 70% of years.

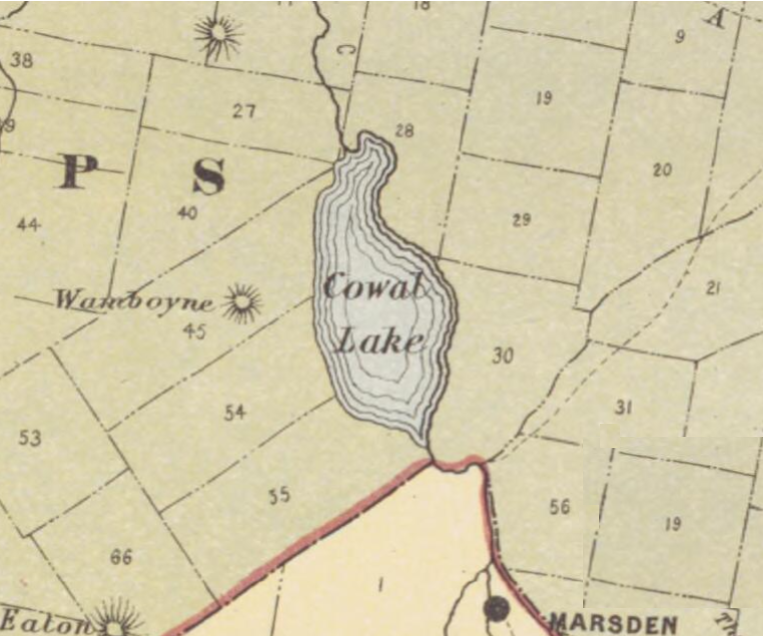
Cowal Lake from John Sands 1886 map.

== Biodiversity ==
Lake Cowal is situated 47 km North East of West Wyalong and is home to a variety of endangered species. Some of these species include:

- Australian pillwort
- Australasian bittern
- Black-necked stork
- Blue-billed duck
- Freshwater catfish (protected)
- Macquarie perch (protected)

== Recognition ==
The lake is listed on the now-defunct Register of the National Estate in 1992 and was added to the Directory of Important Wetlands in Australia in 1998. It is listed as a Landscape Conservation Area by the National Trust of Australia.}

== Mineral resources and mining ==
The area surrounding the lake is rich in minerals - especially gold - and is currently being mined by Evolution Mining. Barrick Gold sold the Cowal Mine to Evolution Mining in 2015 for US$550m. There is concern among environmental groups and the local Wiradjuri Aboriginal people that the cyanide used in the mining process prior to 2007 could lead to the contamination of the lake. The area was explored for gold in the 1980s and 1990s by North Limited, a subsidiary of Rio Tinto Group.

The mine has been producing gold since 2006, and produced 238,000 ounces of gold in 2016. The resource is estimated to still contain approximately 5,000,000 troy ounces (160 t) of gold.

=== Lake Cowal Gold Mine ===
The Cowal Gold Mine Project encompasses approximately 29 square kilometres as of 2023. One hundred and eight million tonnes of low to medium grade ore would be excavated from an open cut pit 1 km wide and 325 metres deep on the lake shore and partly within the high water level of Lake Cowal to produce an estimated 2.7 million ounces of gold.
