= Albert, New South Wales =

Albert New South Wales
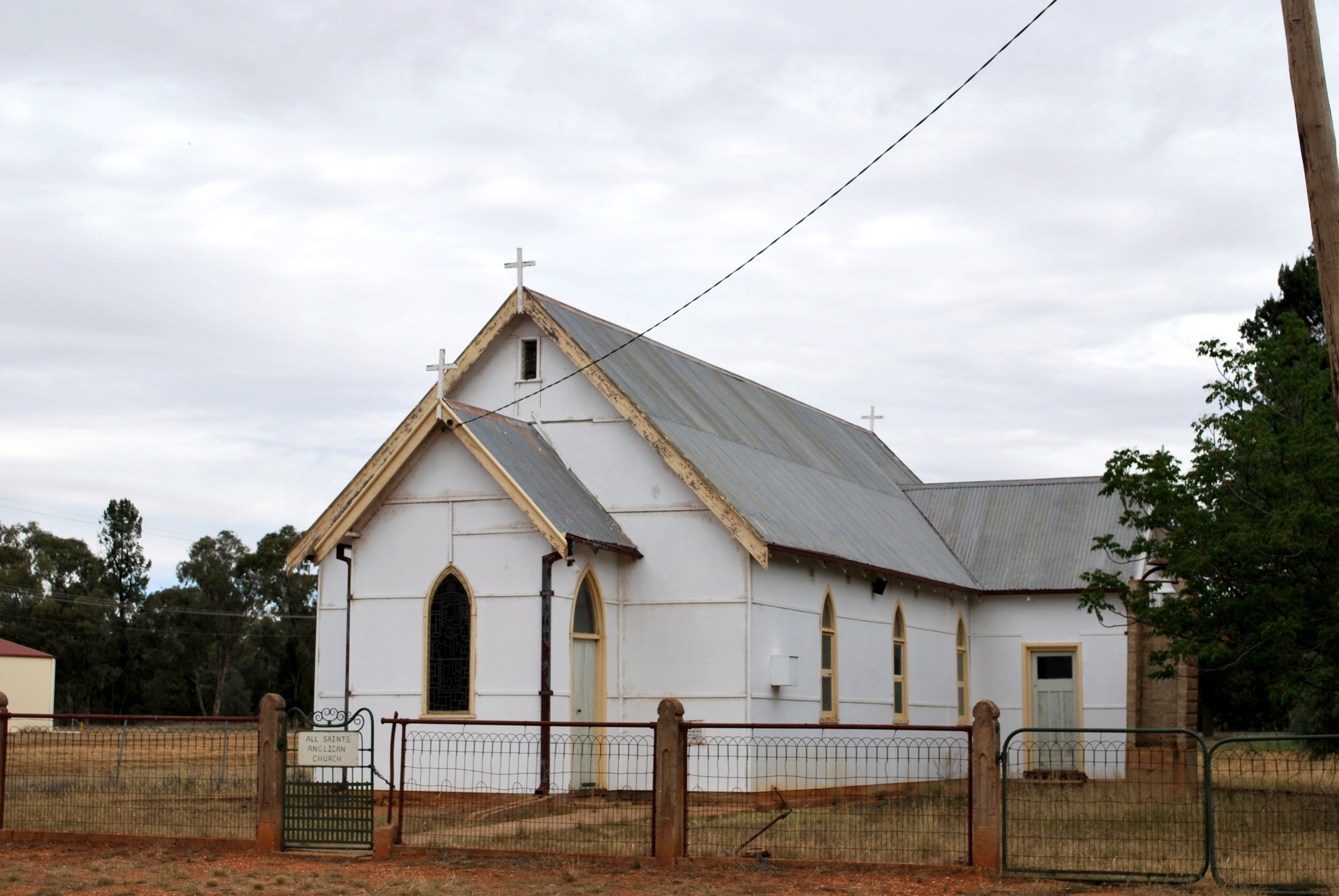
- Albert Anglican Church

- Coordinates: 32°21′S 147°30′E
- Population: 77 (SAL 2021)
- Postcode(s): 2873
- Location: 481 km (299 mi) WNW of Sydney; 141 km (88 mi) W of Dubbo; 25 km (16 mi) SE of Tottenham
- LGA(s): Lachlan Shire
- State electorate(s): Barwon
- Federal division(s): Parkes

Albert is a town in the Central West region of New South Wales, Australia. The town is in the Lachlan Shire local government area, 481 kilometres (299 mi) west north west of the state capital, Sydney.

== History ==
Copper had been discovered in the area by 1900. In the early 20th century, there were several copper mines nearby, the most significant of which was the Iron Duke Mine, which operated from around 1909 until the early 1920s. Around the time that mining commenced, the area was known as 'Albert Water Holes'. Its post office was originally called 'The Alberts' but became Albert in 1916; it closed in 1982.

A school—known as 'Albertia', until it was renamed Albert in January 1920—opened there in January 1899 and closed in June 1972. The date of the opening of the school, the name of one of its streets, Federation Street, and the timing of the discovery of copper suggests that the village itself dates from around the time of Federation.

== Location ==
Albert is on the Bogan Gate–Tottenham railway line. There was a station at Albert and a short branch from Albert to the nearby Iron Duke Mine. The branch line was known officially as the Albert Siding to Iron Duke Mine Railway. The branch line to the mine closed in June 1926.

== Demographics ==
At the 2016 census, Albert had a population of 81, though Albert once had a population of 900. In the 2021 census, the population of Albert had dropped to 77.

== Gallery ==
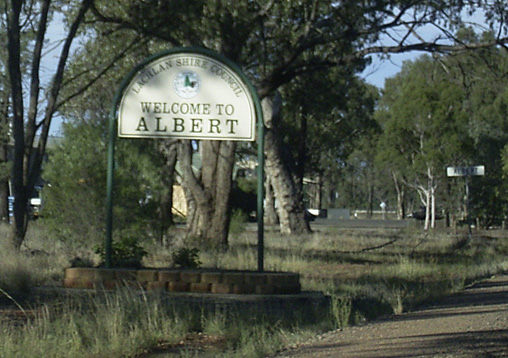
The sign that marks the entrance to the village

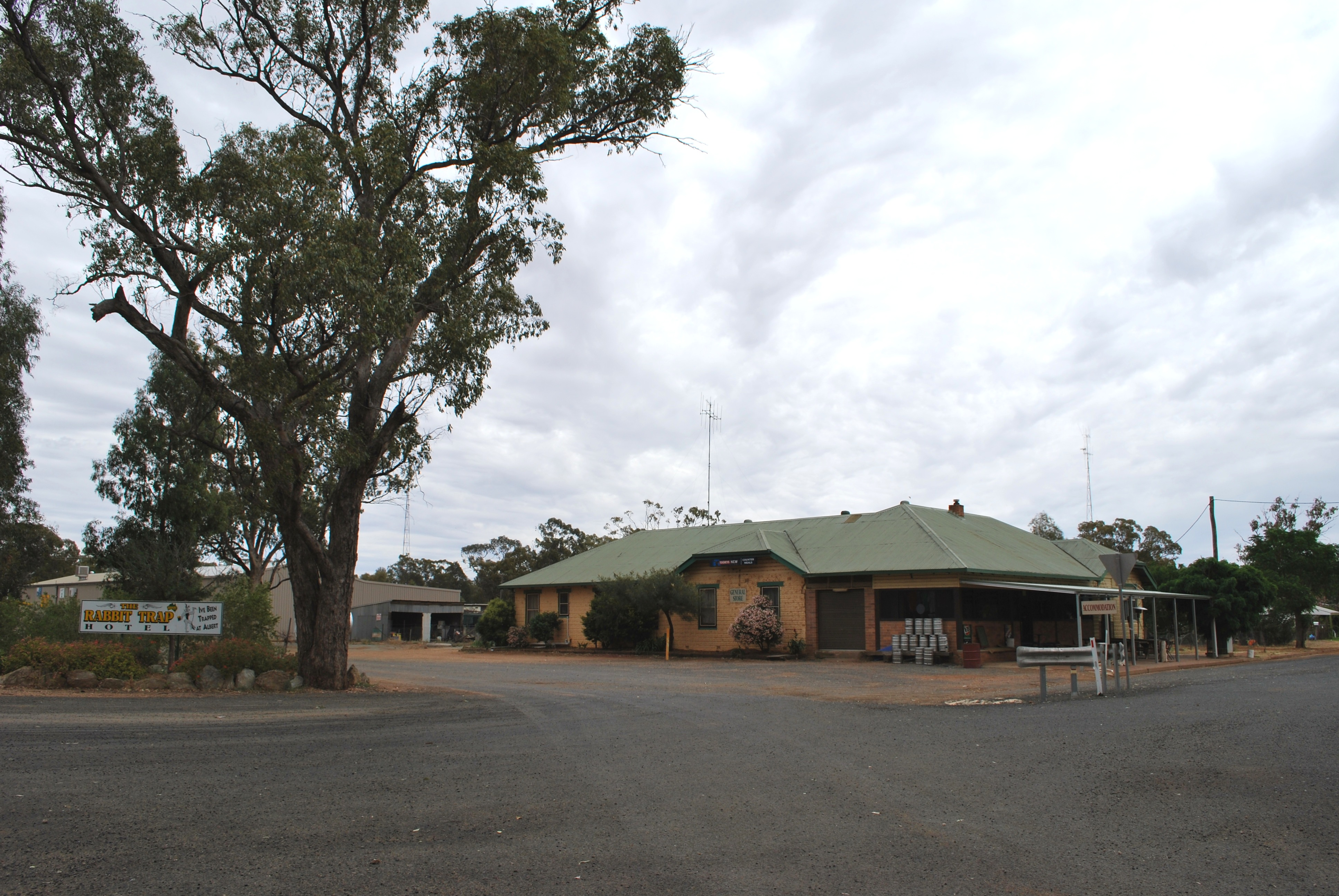
Hotel opposite Albert railway station.

== See also ==
- Lake Albert, New South Wales
- Albert Parish (Delialah County), New South Wales
- Albert Parish (Yantara County) New South Wales
- Albert, (Drake County) New South Wales
- Albert, (Kennedy County) New South Wales
- Albert, (Macquarie County) New South Wales
- Albert, (Sandon County) New South Wales
- Albert, (St Vincent County) New South Wales
