= Lachlan Shire =

- Local government area
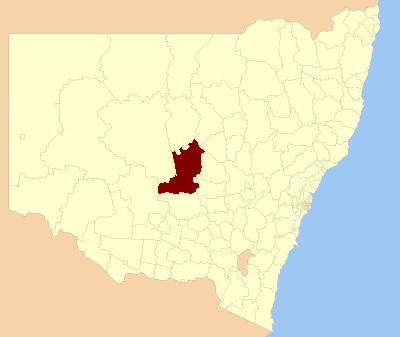
- Location in New South Wales

- Interactive map of Lachlan Shire
- Coordinates: 33°03′S 147°09′E
- Country: Australia
- State: New South Wales
- Region: Central West
- Council seat: Condobolin

Government
  - Mayor: John Medcalf (Unaligned)
  - State electorate: Barwon
  - Federal division: Parkes

Area
  - Total: 14,973 km^{2} (5,781 sq mi)

Population
  - Totals: 6,194 (2016 census); 6,151 (2018 est.)
  - Density: 0.41368/km^{2} (1.07142/sq mi)
- Website: Lachlan Shire
LGAs around Lachlan Shire
Bogan	Warren	Narromine
Cobar	Lachlan Shire	Parkes
Carrathool	Bland	Forbes

Lachlan Shire is a local government area in the Central West region of New South Wales, Australia. The Shire is located adjacent to the Lachlan River, the Lachlan Valley Way and the Broken Hill railway line.

The largest town and council seat is Condobolin. The Shire also includes the towns and villages of Albert, Burcher, Fifield, Lake Cargelligo, Tottenham and Tullibigeal.

The mayor of Lachlan Shire Council is John Medcalf OAM, who is unaligned with any political party.

== Heritage listings ==
The Lachlan Shire has a number of heritage-listed sites, including:

- Condobolin, McDonnell Street: All Saints' Anglican Church, Condobolin

== Council ==
=== Current composition and election method ===
Lachlan Shire Council is composed of ten councillors elected proportionally as five separate wards, each electing two councillors. All councillors are elected for a fixed four-year term of office. The mayor is elected by the councillors at the first meeting of the council.

Party	Councillors
Independent	10
Total	10

The current Council, elected in 2021, is:

Ward	Councillor	Party	Notes
A Ward	John Medcalf	Independent	
A Ward	Megan Mortimer	Independent	
B Ward	Melissa Rees	Independent	
B Ward	Melissa Blewett	Independent	
C Ward	Juanita Wighton	Independent	
C Ward	Peter Harris	Independent	
D Ward	Robyn Turner	Independent	
D Ward	Dennis Brady	Independent	
E Ward	Judith Bartholomew	Independent	
E Ward	Paul Phillips	Independent	

== Past councillors ==
=== 2016–present ===
Year	A Ward		B Ward		C Ward		D Ward		E Ward	
Year	Councillor	Councillor	Councillor	Councillor	Councillor	Councillor	Councillor	Councillor	Councillor	Councillor
2016	John Medcalf (Ind.)	Brian Nelson (Ind.)	Melissa Rees (Ind.)	Melissa Blewett (Ind.)	Dave Carter (Ind.)	Peter Harris (Ind.)	Max Frankel (Ind.)	John Ridley (Ind.)	Mark Hall (Ind.)	Paul Phillips (Ind.)
2021	John Medcalf (Ind.)	Megan Mortimer (Ind.)	Melissa Rees (Ind.)	Melissa Blewett (Ind.)	Dave Carter (Ind.)	Peter Harris (Ind.)	Elaine Bendall (Ind.)	Dennis Brady (Ind.)	Judith Bartholomew (Ind.)	Paul Phillips (Ind.)

== Election results ==
=== 2024 ===
2024 New South Wales local elections: Lachlan
Party	Votes	%	Swing	Seats	Change
Independent					
Formal votes					
Informal votes					
Total				10	
Registered voters / turnout					

=== 2021 ===
2021 New South Wales local elections: Lachlan
Party	Votes	%	Swing	Seats	Change
Independent	649	100.0	+0.0	10	Steady
Formal votes	649	98.2			
Informal votes	12	1.8			
Total	661	100.0			
Registered voters / turnout	4,366	15.14			
