= Condobolin =

- Town
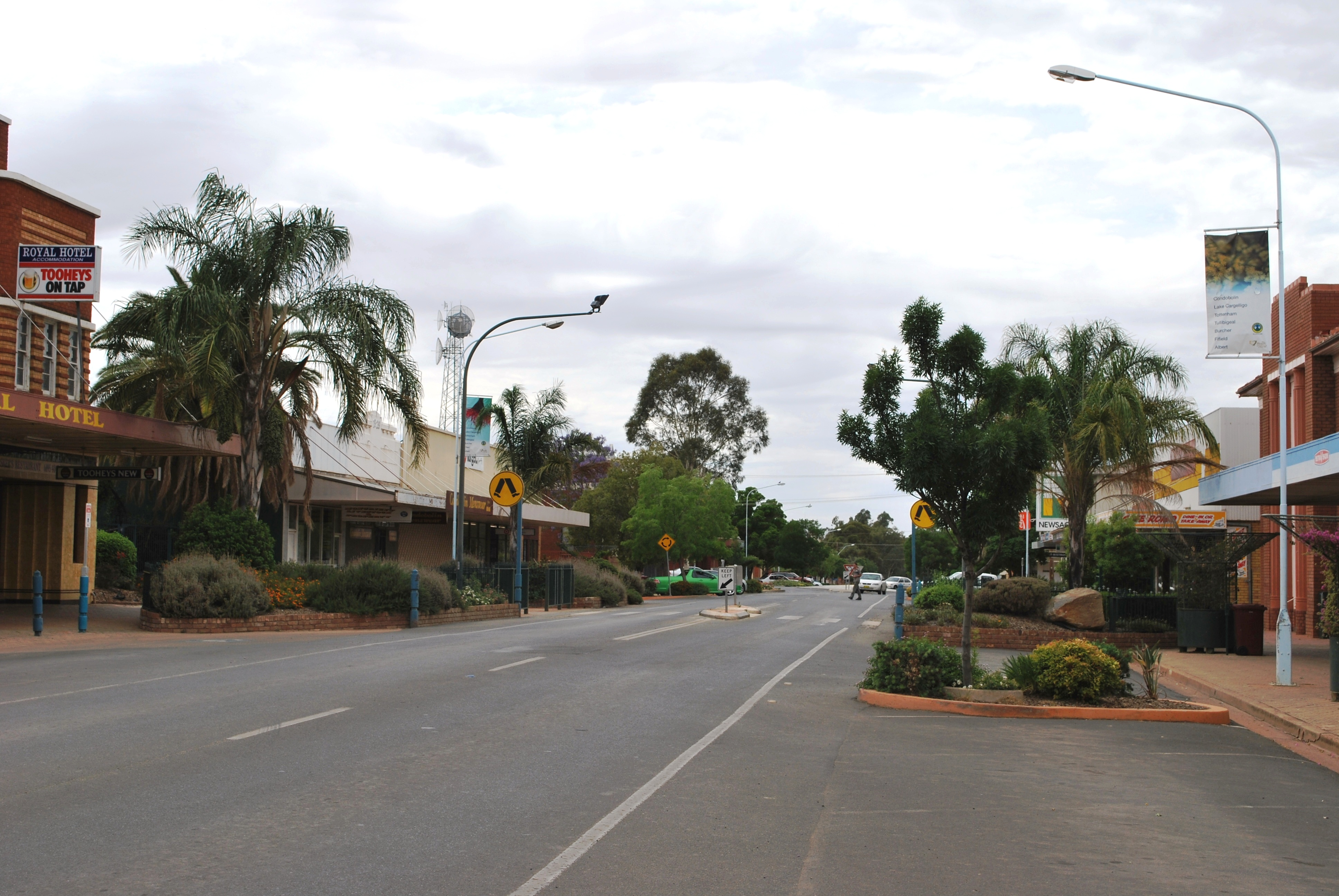
- High street of Condobolin

- Coordinates: 33°05′19″S 147°08′58″E
- Country: Australia
- State: New South Wales
- LGA: Lachlan Shire
- Location: 463 km (288 mi) W of Sydney; 209 km (130 mi) SW of Dubbo
- Established: 1859

Government
  - State electorate: Barwon
  - Federal division: Parkes
- Elevation: 220 m (720 ft)

Population
  - Total: 3,486 (2021 census)
- Postcode: 2877
- Mean max temp: 24.8 °C (76.6 °F)
- Mean min temp: 11.1 °C (52.0 °F)
- Annual rainfall: 448.2 mm (17.65 in)

Condobolin /kənˈdoʊbɑːlən/ is a town in the west of the Central West region of New South Wales, Australia, on the Lachlan River. At the 2021 census, Condobolin had a population of 3,185.

== History ==
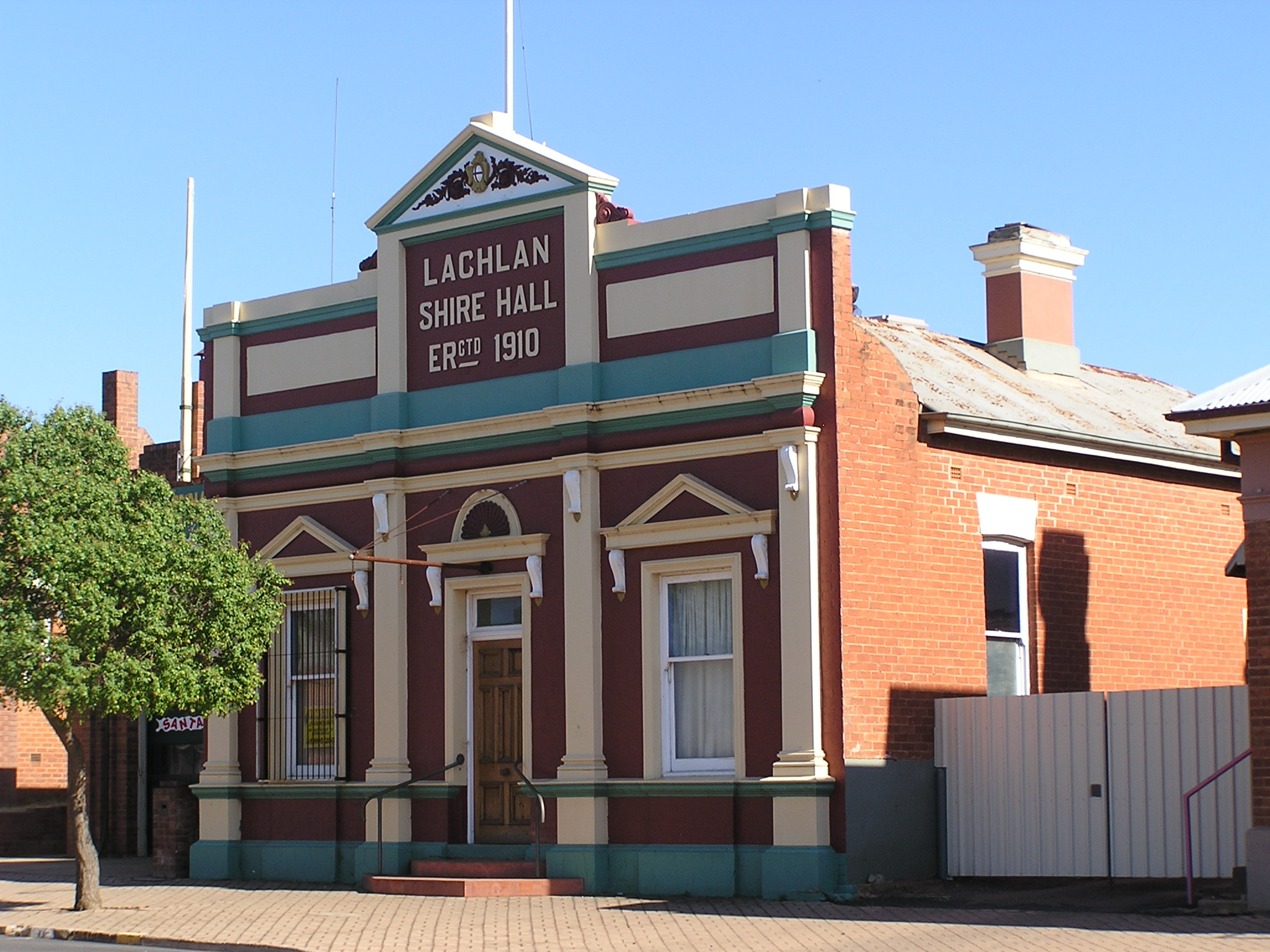
Shire Hall built 1910

Prior to European settlement, the area was inhabited by the Wiradjuri people.

Australian Heritage magazine suggested that Condobolin evolved from the "Aboriginal" word Cundabullen – shallow crossing. The magazine stated that the crossing was located a short distance below the junction of the Lachlan River and the Goobang Creek. Others suggest that the town's name from the Wiradjuri word for 'hop bush', or 'hop brush'.

The area was explored by John Oxley in 1817 and Thomas Mitchell in 1836. The 'Condoublin' run was established by 1844. There had been squatters in the district since Mitchell's 1836 exploration. Closer settlement of the area began in 1880 when the large runs were broken up into smaller holdings.

The town of Condobolin was proclaimed in 1859. The railway arrived in 1898, and the town's population boomed, assisted by finds in 1885 of copper north of the town and in 1896 of gold in the district, north-west of the town. A major copper and gold mine was in operation at Condobolin from 1898 until around 1910. Agriculture is still a major influence on the town, production having expanded with the damming of the Lachlan River in 1935 by the Wyangala Dam. Wheat, barley, canola, wool, sheep and cattle are produced in the district. In more recent years irrigation has brought horticulture and cotton to the Lachlan River area.

Chinese community Chinese people began settling in Condobolin during the 1870s. A Chinese camp developed near the eastern end of Molong Street, between Goobang Creek and the Lachlan River. Its population included market gardeners, storekeepers and labourers employed in fencing, ringbarking and other forms of pastoral work. Chinese market gardeners cultivated land near the locality known as Chinamen's Bridge and sold produce in Condobolin and surrounding towns. Chinese-owned businesses included grocery stores operated by George U Long and Sam Yook, while Sam Yook was also associated with the skin-buying firm Lee Chong and Company.[7] The camp contained a Chinese temple, commonly described at the time as a joss house. It was destroyed by fire in January 1902. Contemporary reports described it as an elaborate building containing valuable carvings, some of which were rescued.[8][9] The local Chinese community constructed a replacement temple within several months.[10] Members of the community contributed to local charitable appeals, including hospital and wartime fundraising. Newspaper reports from 1914 referred to a Condobolin branch of the Chinese Masonic Society, while a 1919 hospital appeal recorded donations from numerous Chinese residents.[7] The community declined during the first half of the twentieth century as its predominantly male population aged and rural employment patterns changed. In November 1945, Ng Sha Gong, generally known as Ah Gong, an elderly Chinese market gardener, was murdered near his hut outside Condobolin.[11] Local histories identify his death as marking the final years of Condobolin’s early Chinese community.[7]

The Lachlan River saw paddle steamer traffic from the 1860s up until the 1920s.

The video clip for Shannon Noll's first single What About Me? was filmed in Condobolin at His home Town.

== Heritage listings ==
Condobolin has a number of heritage-listed sites, including:

- McDonnell Street: All Saints' Anglican Church, Condobolin
- Various monuments and war memorials.

== Geography ==
Condobolin is very close to Mount Tilga, which is said by some to be the geographical centre of New South Wales. Geosciences Australia's Bicentennial project however suggests near the Five Ways, 33 km west north west of Tottenham as one possible centre and makes no reference to Mount Tilga.

Condobolin is located at the junction of Lachlan River and Goobang Creek. It is 463 kilometres (288 mi) west of Australia's largest city, Sydney.

Close to Condobolin is the Overflow Station, the setting of the poem Clancy of the Overflow by Banjo Paterson. The poem is about a Queensland drover and a sheep shearer responsible for herding large mobs of sheep long distances to market.

== Climate ==
Condobolin features a borderline hot semi-arid / cold semi-arid climate (BSh / BSk) with very hot summers and cool winters. Seasonal range is considerable: the average minimum / maximum temperature in January is 18.6 °C (65.5 °F) / 33.7 °C (92.7 °F), while the average minimum / maximum in July is 3.7 °C (38.7 °F) / 15.2 °C (59.4 °F). Rainfall is spread evenly throughout the year in scant amounts. The town is very sunny, receiving 156.6 clear days annually. There was at least one occurrence of snowfall in the district, on 5 July 1900, while the Melrose Plains nearer Tullamore saw a fall of snow some 26 years prior to that.

Climate data for Condobolin Retirement Village (1907–1995, rainfall 1881–2025); 220 m AMSL; 33.08° S, 147.15° E
Month	Jan	Feb	Mar	Apr	May	Jun	Jul	Aug	Sep	Oct	Nov	Dec	Year
Record high °C (°F)	46.8 (116.2)	46.9 (116.4)	40.9 (105.6)	37.0 (98.6)	33.6 (92.5)	25.8 (78.4)	24.8 (76.6)	29.5 (85.1)	37.1 (98.8)	41.2 (106.2)	45.0 (113.0)	46.4 (115.5)	46.9 (116.4)
Mean daily maximum °C (°F)	33.7 (92.7)	33.0 (91.4)	29.8 (85.6)	24.7 (76.5)	19.8 (67.6)	15.8 (60.4)	15.2 (59.4)	17.4 (63.3)	21.2 (70.2)	25.4 (77.7)	29.1 (84.4)	32.3 (90.1)	24.8 (76.6)
Mean daily minimum °C (°F)	18.6 (65.5)	18.4 (65.1)	15.4 (59.7)	10.8 (51.4)	7.3 (45.1)	4.6 (40.3)	3.7 (38.7)	4.9 (40.8)	7.3 (45.1)	10.8 (51.4)	14.2 (57.6)	16.9 (62.4)	11.1 (51.9)
Record low °C (°F)	7.3 (45.1)	5.7 (42.3)	3.9 (39.0)	−1.2 (29.8)	−4.8 (23.4)	−6.1 (21.0)	−8.1 (17.4)	−5.5 (22.1)	−3.9 (25.0)	−0.5 (31.1)	1.2 (34.2)	5.3 (41.5)	−8.1 (17.4)
Average precipitation mm (inches)	44.9 (1.77)	37.5 (1.48)	39.8 (1.57)	33.8 (1.33)	34.8 (1.37)	37.1 (1.46)	33.8 (1.33)	35.2 (1.39)	31.6 (1.24)	41.6 (1.64)	37.9 (1.49)	40.3 (1.59)	448.2 (17.65)
Average precipitation days (≥ 0.2 mm)	4.4	4.1	4.5	4.6	5.8	7.6	7.6	7.2	6.0	6.1	5.0	4.9	67.8
Average afternoon relative humidity (%)	36	38	40	44	55	62	60	53	47	42	38	34	46
Source 1: Condobolin Retirement Village (general data, 1881–2025)
Source 2: Condobolin Airport AWS (extreme temperatures, 1993–2025)

== Demographics ==
Historical population
Year	Pop.	±%
1921	1,470	—
1933	2,572	+75.0%
1947	2,616	+1.7%
1954	2,840	+8.6%
1961	3,150	+10.9%
1966	3,593	+14.1%
1971	3,216	−10.5%
1976	3,273	+1.8%
1981	3,355	+2.5%
1986	3,229	−3.8%
1991	3,163	−2.0%
1996	3,100	−2.0%
2001	3,050	−1.6%
2006	2,847	−6.7%
2011	2,755	−3.2%
2016	2,864	+4.0%
2021	2,579	−10.0%
Source: Australian Bureau of Statistics data.

At the 2021 census, Condobolin recorded a population of 3,486; a fall from the 3,743 recorded in 2011. The median age was 38. 22.1% of residents reported being Aboriginal and/or Torres Strait Islander; the median age among this group was 21.

85.0% of respondents reported being born in Australia; substantially higher than the national average of 66.7%. 79.8% of residents reported having both parents born in Australia, compared to the national average of 47.3%. 88.8% of respondents spoke only English at home.

Christianity was the largest religious group in Condobolin at 78.6% of stated responses on religion. This included the denominations of Catholic (27.0%), Anglican (23.6%) and Presbyterian and Reformed (6.4%). 17.8% reported having no religion, lower than the national average of 29.6%. 10.8% of residents did not state a response to the optional question on religion.

== Sport ==
The most popular sport in Condobolin is rugby league. The local club, the Condobolin Rams, play in the Woodbridge Cup competition, in which the club won the 2021 Premiership. Historically, the club is part of the Group 11 Rugby League district.

Condobolin formerly had an Australian rules team in the Northern Riverina League.

== Events ==
Condobolin is home to a two-day cross country navigational rally, known as the "Condo 750". The Condo 750 runs over a variety of private and public roads and tracks and attracts competitors from all over Australia. It is a CAMS and MA sanctioned event. The course is made up of competitive sections known as selective sections which are timed over private tracks around the various sheep and cattle stations, these range in length from 20 to 70 kilometres (12 to 43 mi). Non-competitive road sections on public roads join the sections, these range from 0.2 to 30 kilometres (0.12 to 18.64 mi). The total length of the course is over 750 kilometres (470 mi).

Each year, the local show society runs the annual Condobolin Show in late August over two days. The event features livestock, showjumping, cookery competitions, entertainment, fireworks, and car-boot picnics around the main arena.

== Transport ==
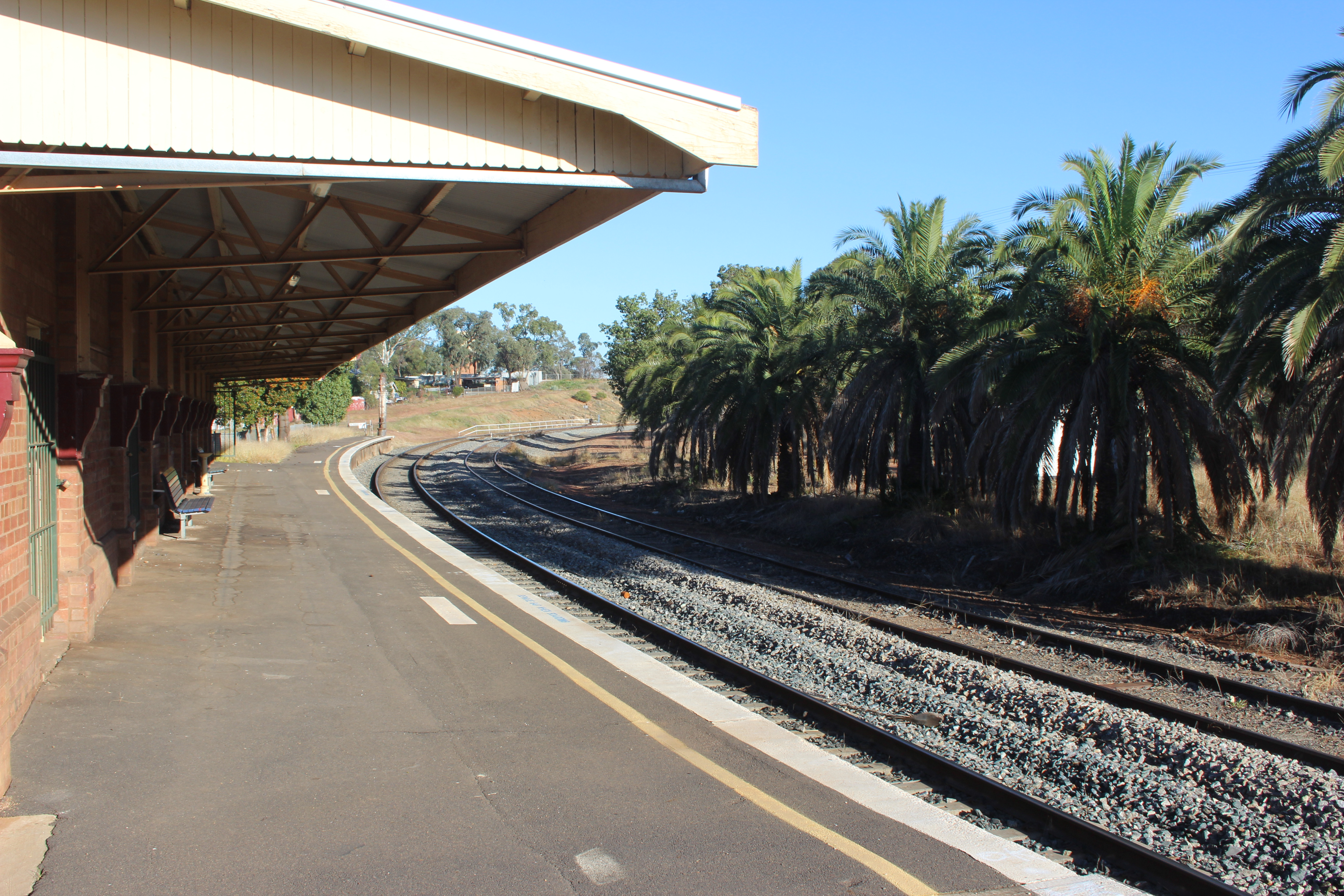
Condobolin railway station

Condobolin railway station opened in 1898 and lies on the Broken Hill railway line. The station is served by the twice-weekly Indian Pacific train, as well as NSW TrainLink's Broken Hill Outback Xplorer train. This train heads to Broken Hill on Mondays (Stopping at 2:01pm) and to Sydney on Tuesdays (Stopping at 1:41pm).

== Notable residents ==
- Don Athaldo (born in Condobolin), strongman
- William Beech, inventor of the periscope rifle holder in WWI
- Kevin Gilbert, poet, author, playwright, activist
- Percy Knight, former NSWRL Player for Balmain Tigers and Canberra Raiders
- Tim Gavel, ABC sports broadcaster
- Bill Leak, cartoonist
- Eris O'Brien, archbishop
- Shannon Noll, singer
