= Tottenham, New South Wales =

Tottenham
- Town
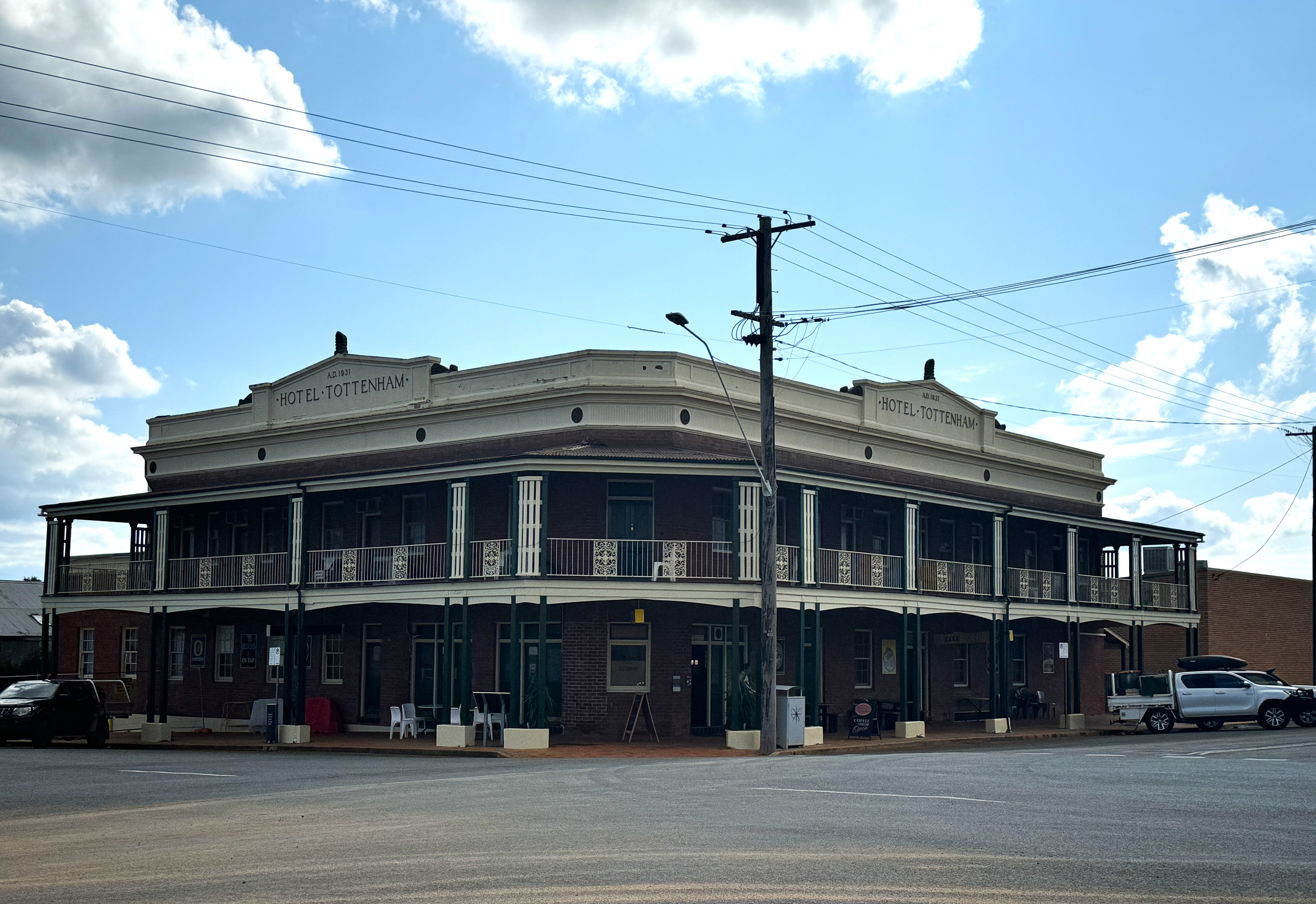
- Tottenham Hotel, built in 1931

- Coordinates: 32°15′0″S 147°21′0″E
- Country: Australia
- State: New South Wales
- LGA: Lachlan Shire
- Location: 506 km (314 mi) WNW of Sydney; 154 km (96 mi) W of Dubbo; 134 km (83 mi) N of Condobolin; 80 km (50 mi) SW of Trangie; 88 km (55 mi) S of Nyngan

Government
  - State electorate: Barwon
  - Federal division: Parkes

Population
  - Total: 263 (2021 census)
- Postcode: 2873
- County: Kennedy County, Beaconsfield Parish, New South Wales
- Mean max temp: 24.5 °C (76.1 °F)
- Mean min temp: 10.0 °C (50.0 °F)
- Annual rainfall: 497.4 mm (19.58 in)

Tottenham is a small town in Lachlan Shire in the Central West of New South Wales, Australia. Tottenham is known as “The Soul of the Centre”, a reference to it being the nearest town to the geographical centre of New South Wales. It had a population of 263 at the 2021 census, including 25 Indigenous people (9.5%) and 61 foreign born people (23.2%).

== History ==
Tottenham is at the end of a railway line from Bogan Gate, completed in 1916, with Tottenham Post Office opening on 8 April 1907.

There was copper mining in the area, between 1903 and the late 1920s. The branch railway once extended beyond Tottenham to the smelters of the Mount Royal Mine and there was also a spur line to the Caroline Mine.

== Location ==
Tottenham lies in a wheat-growing area. A cairn marks the centre of New South Wales and is located 33 km west-north-west of Tottenham.

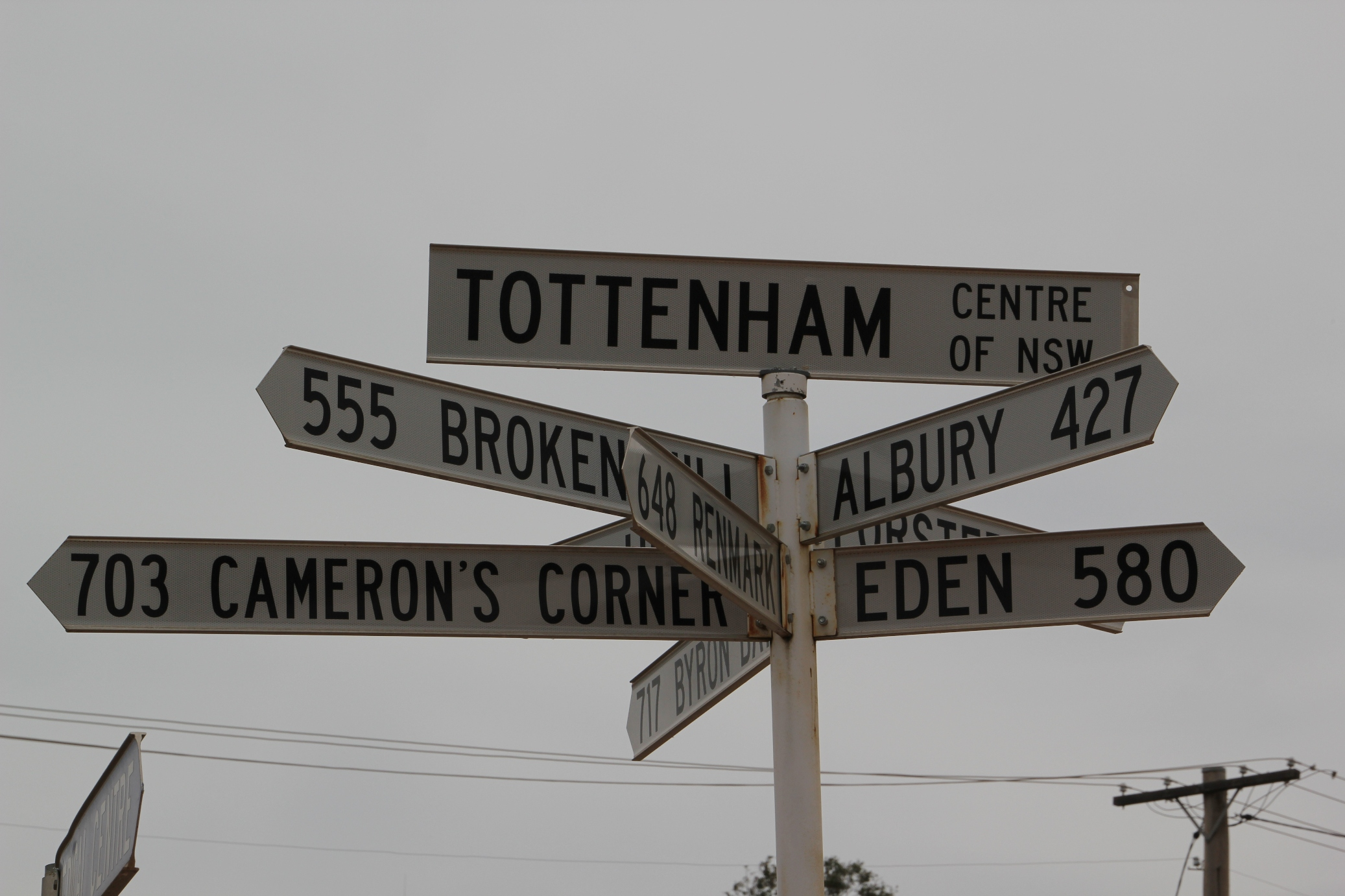
Tottenham Sign Post

Beginning in September 2008, the annual Far Cairn Rally for touring motorcyclists has been held at the Tottenham Race Course. The name alludes to the cairn being far from Sydney. It is organised by the BMW Touring Club of New South Wales.

== Achievements ==
In 2012, the tiny township was selected as the Most Outstanding Community in New South Wales and the ACT (with a population of 15,000 or less), in a competition organised by Prime7; the town is within the television network’s broadcast footprint.

=== Airstrip ===
The town sealed its local airstrip, erected kangaroo-proof fences around the perimeter, and had lighting for night operations installed, with half of the costs coming from private donations. Locals had been upset that an air ambulance aircraft of the Royal Flying Doctor Service had not been able to land there for a medical emergency involving one of the leading members of the local populace.

=== Medical and other services ===
The town also successfully searched the world to recruit its own doctor, when the Health Department had said that no suitable doctor could be found. Five locals came forward to form a team of local volunteer ambulance officers, in support of the two full-time paramedics that are provided by the NSW Ambulance Service. Finally, the town constructed a spacious sports centre in a dollar-for-dollar agreement with the local Shire. All of these projects in the one year contributed to Tottenham's selection as Community of the Year for NSW.

== Climate ==
Being near the geographical centre of New South Wales, the seasonal range is quite marked, with long, hot summers and cool winters, and rather scanty rainfall through the year – mainly resulting from severe thunderstorms and northwest cloudbands. There are two known occurrences of snowfall in the district, on 5 July 1900 and some time in 1874 (both having occurred on the Melrose Plains to the south-west).

Climate data for Tullamore (Kitchener St, 1970–1988, rainfall 1914–2024); 244 m AMSL; 32.63° S, 147.57° E
Month	Jan	Feb	Mar	Apr	May	Jun	Jul	Aug	Sep	Oct	Nov	Dec	Year
Record high °C (°F)	45.3 (113.5)	42.7 (108.9)	39.0 (102.2)	36.3 (97.3)	28.5 (83.3)	26.3 (79.3)	24.0 (75.2)	28.5 (83.3)	35.7 (96.3)	37.0 (98.6)	43.1 (109.6)	42.0 (107.6)	45.3 (113.5)
Mean daily maximum °C (°F)	33.1 (91.6)	32.4 (90.3)	29.5 (85.1)	24.7 (76.5)	19.9 (67.8)	16.1 (61.0)	15.3 (59.5)	17.2 (63.0)	20.5 (68.9)	24.6 (76.3)	28.4 (83.1)	32.2 (90.0)	24.5 (76.1)
Mean daily minimum °C (°F)	17.8 (64.0)	17.9 (64.2)	14.4 (57.9)	10.1 (50.2)	6.6 (43.9)	3.2 (37.8)	2.4 (36.3)	3.4 (38.1)	5.8 (42.4)	9.6 (49.3)	12.6 (54.7)	15.7 (60.3)	10.0 (49.9)
Record low °C (°F)	8.1 (46.6)	7.5 (45.5)	4.5 (40.1)	−2.0 (28.4)	−3.5 (25.7)	−3.7 (25.3)	−5.6 (21.9)	−3.0 (26.6)	−2.2 (28.0)	0.8 (33.4)	1.5 (34.7)	5.5 (41.9)	−5.6 (21.9)
Average precipitation mm (inches)	52.6 (2.07)	46.9 (1.85)	42.6 (1.68)	37.6 (1.48)	38.1 (1.50)	38.4 (1.51)	35.5 (1.40)	37.6 (1.48)	33.0 (1.30)	43.7 (1.72)	46.4 (1.83)	45.1 (1.78)	497.4 (19.58)
Average precipitation days (≥ 0.2 mm)	5.1	4.7	4.4	4.3	5.5	6.5	6.7	6.4	5.3	6.2	5.5	5.0	65.6
Source: Australian Bureau of Meteorology; Tullamore (Kitchener St)
