= Henry Parkes Way =

Road in New South Wales, Australia

Henry Parkes Way New South Wales
- Coordinates: 33.089113°S 147.152158°E (West end); 33.245292°S 148.814467°E (East end)

General information
- Type: Rural road
- Length: 171 km (106 mi)
- Gazetted: August 1928 (as Main Road 224); April 1938 (as Trunk Road 61)
- Former route number: State Route 90 (1974–2013)

Major junctions
- West end: Bathurst Street; Condobolin, New South Wales
- The Bogan Way; Newell Highway
- East end: Escort Way; Boree, New South Wales

Location(s)
- Major settlements: Bogan Gate, Parkes, Manildra

Henry Parkes Way is a 171-kilometre (106 mi) country road in New South Wales, Australia, running from Condobolin via Parkes to Escort Way in Boree. It is named after Henry Parkes, a long-serving premier of the Colony of New South Wales, and promoter for the federation of the six colonies of Australia.

== Route ==
Henry Parkes Way commences at the intersection of William and Bathurst Streets at Condobolin and heads in an easterly direction through Bogan Gate to Parkes, and from there via Manildra, before it ends at an intersection with Escort Way at Boree. It is a single-carriageway, two-lane sealed road for its entire length.

== History ==
The passing of the Main Roads Act of 1924 through the Parliament of New South Wales provided for the declaration of Main Roads, roads partially funded by the State government through the Main Roads Board (later Transport for NSW). Main Road No. 224 was declared along this road on 8 August 1928, from Condobolin via Parkes and Manildra to the intersection with Orange-Eugowra Road (today Escort Way) at Boree. With the passing of the Main Roads (Amendment) Act of 1929 to provide for additional declarations of State Highways and Trunk Roads, this was amended to Main Road 224 on 8 April 1929.

Trunk Road 61 was re-aligned to run between Orange and Condobolin via Parkes on 6 April 1938 (subsuming Main Road 224); its former alignment between Condobolin via Eugowra and Cudal to Boree was replaced by Main Road 377 (later named part of Lachlan Valley Way and Escort Way).

The passing of the Roads Act of 1993 updated road classifications and the way they could be declared within New South Wales. Under this act, Henry Parkes Way today retains its declaration as part of Main Road 61, from Condobolin to Boree.

Henry Parkes Way was signed State Route 90 in 1974. With the conversion to the newer alphanumeric system in 2013, State Route 90 was removed and not replaced.

== Major intersections ==
LGA	Location	km	mi	Destinations	Notes
Lachlan	Condobolin	0.0	0.0	Bathurst Street – Nyngan, Nymagee	Western terminus of Henry Parkes Way, which runs east as Bathurst Street
Lachlan	Condobolin	0.0	0.0	Willian Street – Lake Cargelligo, West Wyalong	
Lachlan	Condobolin	6.9	4.3	Fifield Road – Fifield, Tullamore	
Parkes	Bogan Gate	64.6	40.1	The Bogan Way – Tullamore, Nyngan, Narromine	
Parkes	Parkes	101.4	63.0	Bogan Street (Newell Highway (A39 north) – Dubbo, Moree	Concurrency with route A39
Parkes	Parkes	101.8	63.3	Bogan Street (Newell Highway (A39 south) – Forbes, West Wyalong	Concurrency with route A39
Parkes	Parkes	103.6	64.4	Renshaw McGirr Way – Yeoval, Wellington	
Parkes	Parkes	107.5	66.8	Muzycuk Drive – Parkes Airport	
Cabonne	Manildra	155.5	96.6	Packham Drive – Molong	
Cabonne	Boree	170.8	106.1	Escort Way (B81) – Orange, Cudal, Molong	Eastern terminus of Henry Parkes Way
1.000 mi = 1.609 km; 1.000 km = 0.621 mi: Concurrency terminus; Route transition

== See also ==
- Highways in Australia
- List of highways in New South Wales
