= Amusu Theatre =

Cinema in Manildra, New South Wales, Australia

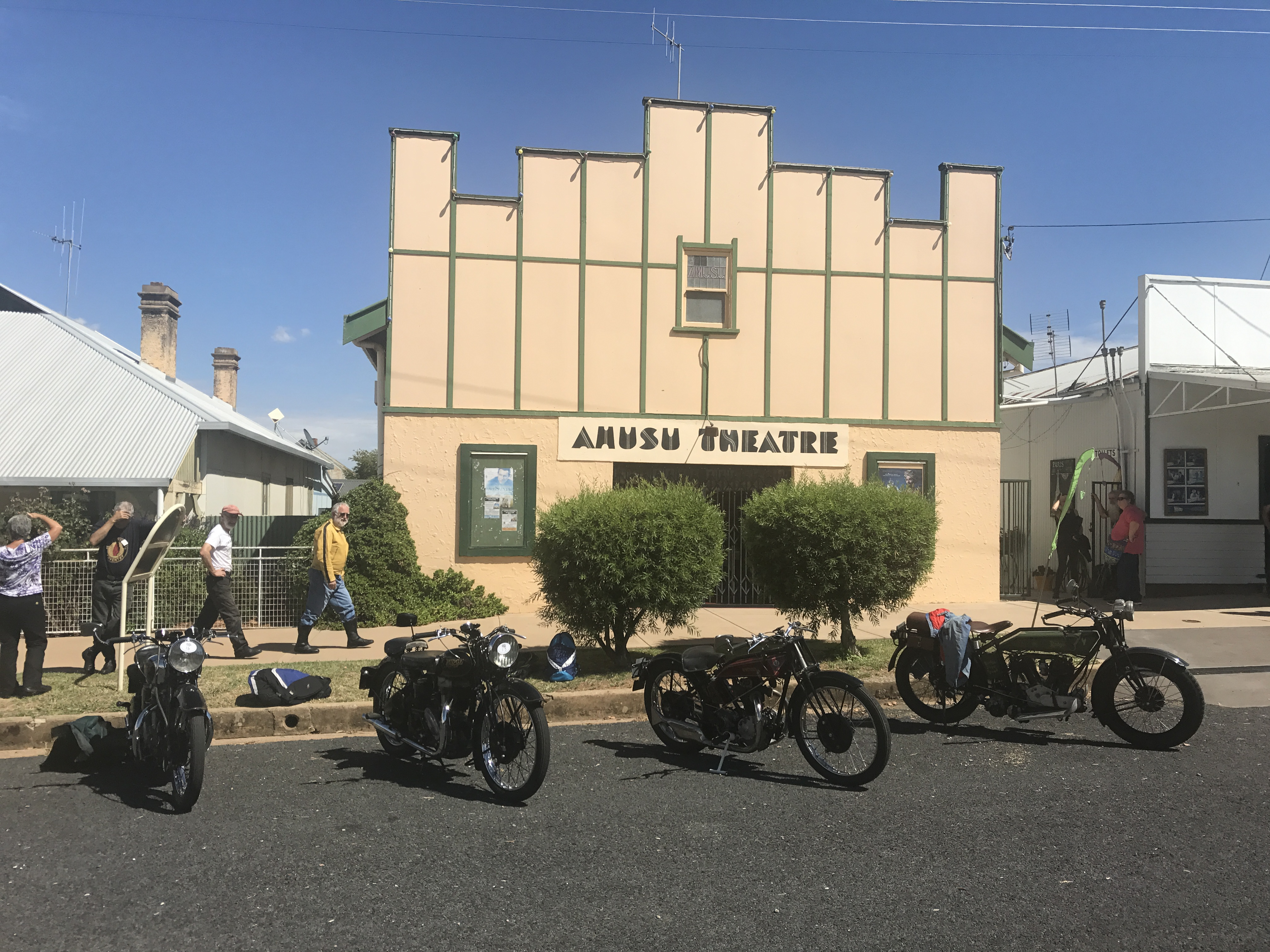
- Amusu Theatre, 2018

- Location within New South Wales Location within Australia
- 33.1848°S 148.6939°E
- Location: 17 Derowie Street, Manildra, Cabonne Shire, New South Wales, Australia

History
- Built: 1936

Site notes
- Architect: Allan Tom
- Owner: Cabonne Council

New South Wales Heritage Register
- Official name: Amusu Theatre; Amusu Cinema
- Type: state heritage (built)
- Designated: 26 November 1999
- Reference no.: 1308
- Type: Cinema
- Category: Recreation and Entertainment
- Builders: Jim Fullerton

Amusu Theatre is a heritage-listed cinema and theatre at 17 Derowie Street, Manildra, in the Central West region of New South Wales, Australia. It was designed by Allan Tom and built in 1936 by Jim Fullerton. It is also known as Amusu Cinema. The property is owned by the Cabonne Council. It was added to the New South Wales State Heritage Register on 26 November 1999.

== History ==
Movies were first screened at Manildra around 1910. In 1914, they were shown in Fleeting's Hall, Derowie Street. Starting during the silent era, Allan Tom quickly adapted equipment for the "talkies". Known as a travelling picture show pioneer, Tom toured the central, western, and goldfields areas of New South Wales from the early 1920s into the 1940s - to areas as far afield as Cobar, Bourke and Hillston. During the Great Depression he showed movies in a tent, providing desperately needed support and entertainment in remote areas.

He moved into Reid's Hall in 1923, then onto the Memorial Hall in Kiewa Street after its construction in 1925. He built the Amusu in 1936 in Derowie Street with seating for 300 on one level. The name "Amusu" was derived from contact with an equipment supplier in the early 1930s. Allan Tom collaborated with a local school teacher to draw up the plans. Tom's passion for sound meant he had to ensure the theatre would have good acoustics. For this reason, he lined the theatre with Donaconna board, a material imported from the USA. Tom employed a local Manildra resident to build the cinema, Jim Fullerton. For two decades he also operated theatres in Millthorpe and Tullamore.

Allan Tom battled through drought, flood, depression, advent of clubs, television and video, finally reducing his screenings to Saturday nights only. Notwithstanding his advancing years, he continued to operate the Amusu until his death in 1995, aged 93. The Tom family continues operating the theatre, despite a temporary closure to undertake safety repairs.

In addition, the Tom family has strong historic links to early squatter days and the first discovery of gold. Nationalism is commemorated in incorporation of "Australia" within the names of various members of the Tom family, including being Allan's middle name, and having links to the Australia Theatre in Orange.

The theatre and adjacent garage were acquired by the Cabonne Shire Council in 2003.

The theatre is now operated by a committee and conducts new release screenings every third Saturday night of the month and special screenings by arrangement. The neighbouring Tom's Garage has been converted into a movie poster museum with a collection of 30,000 posters, with the help of a $50,000 state government grant.

== Chronology ==
- 1822: William Tom Junior [d. 1904) born to "Parson" William Snr and Ann, née Lane, Tom of Cornwall UK
- 1823: Tom family arrives in Australia
- 1824: Tom family was granted land at Sidmouth Valley
- 1829: Nicholas Tom born [d. 12 October 1888] to "Parson" William Snr and Ann Tom
- 1829: Western Lands restrictions lifted; William Tom applies for land at Lewis Ponds Creek north of Orange; one of 1st to venture West of the Blue Mountains; family build Springfield (still stands today); William Tom Snr becomes a lay preacher and hence known as "Parson Tom", and manager for Borecabonne station then in the ownership of Sir Rev. Samual Marsden's daughter; Marsden brings the 1st merino flock across the Blue Mountains to Borecabonne station [an RNE listed place]
- 1843: Tom brothers, John and William Jnr take stock overland to Gippsland to run called 'Tom's Camp'
- 1850: William Tom Jnr with John Lister find 2 gold nuggets weighing 2oz each on a claim in partnership with Edward Hargraves, near Ophir and hence begins Australia's 1st gold rush
- 1858: Nicholas Tom marries Eliza McGraw [d1906]; raise 6 children
- 1867: Sydney Tom born [d.1954], 5th child to Nicholas and Eliza
- 1894: Sydney Tom married Emma Westfield Hastings Glazier [known as Wes b.1870 d.1931], daughter of James Glazier and Emma Lewis who held the licence for Intermediate Hotel, Murga - a Cobb & Co changing station and post office
- 1894: James [Jim] Tom born to Sydney and Wes; drought
- 1895: first moving picture screened in Paris
- 1901: Federation of Australia
- 1902: 27 January Edwin Allan Australia Tom born to Sydney and Wes at Bushman's Dam, near Parks, NSW; drought
- 1905: Sydney & Wes Tom move to Manildra
- 1905: first official demonstration of radio transmission by Marconi at Point Lonsdale, Victoria
- 1906: first motor car to Murga
- 1914: Tom's garage and carriers commences business (still operating in 1999); being underage Allan Tom uses a horse and cart
- 1915: At 13 Allan Tom leaves school to commence work in father's bike shop
- 1916: Allan Tom travels to Sydney to sit Railway Exams; Jim Tom invalided home from World War 1 and starts car hire business using a Model T Ford and charging 'a bob a mile'
- 1918: 16 year old Allan Tom obtains driver's license at Cudal (held continuously until his death in 1995)
- 1921: Jim Tom takes over the family garage, Sydney Tom operates bike store in front office and Allan Tom runs car hire business
- 1922: Mr Kendall from Condobolin brings 1st electrical moving picture to Manildra
- 1923: Allan Tom sets up 1st silent film show in Manildra with loan of £500 at 10% interest from local publican; business starts showing movies with Australian made Cummings & Wilson projector; mother Wes plays piano; when travelling uses HMV phonograph for sound
- 1925: 26 January - first commercial radio station 2UE opens, 5 value radio sets introduced
- 1926: Allan Tom modifies an Oldsmobile car to act as a mobile projection room and a Chevrolet truck to cart tents, seats and other paraphernalia; Tom brothers buy first radio in Manildra
- 1927: Allan marries Dorothy (Dorrie) McDonald of Crookwell [b. 8 June 1903 d.1982 of cancer] at St Saviours Church of England, Goulburn; 5 daughters born Norma Lynette (Lyn) b. 1928 m. Jeff Woohart of Manildra, Gweneth b. 1929 m Proudfoot of Orange, Phyllis Elizabeth (Betty) b. 1931 m. Maxworth of Manildra and Janet b. 1937 m. Powe of Orange; son Edward b. 1934 d. 1939
- 1929: Allan Tom supplies sound for Canowindra Theatre
- 1930: Allan Tom introduces "talkies" to Manildra by adapting existing equipment
- 1931: Allan Tom commences regular 4 to 6 week tours of Western NSW and writes own publicity brochures and posters
- 1932: Allan Tom has difficulty renting halls so buys a marque, folding chairs, pianola
- 1936: Allan Tom builds the AMUSU at Manildra and theatre at Tullamore.
- 19??: Allan Tom leases theatres in Wyanga, Trundle and Peak Hill; Allan Tom installs first street light in Manildra outside the family owned garage
- 1937: Jim Tom dies and is buried on Anzac Day; Allan Tom forced to run family garage business and employs a crew to run the touring show until 1949
- 1940: Allan Tom rebuilds the garage next door to the Amusu theatre
- 1942: Allan Tom buys Frape's Hall to establish the Millthorpe Amusu theatre with Stan Goode as manager
- 1949: Lynette Tom marries Jeff Woodhart, together they take over the touring show business [until late 1950s]; Allan Tom draws up a petition for outlying school students to be bussed to Manildra and offers to provide the service
- 1965: Allan Tom takes over NRMA Service van for Manildra, Cudal, Murga, Toogong and Cargo (relinquished in 1992 aged 90)
- 1983: Allan Tom celebrates 60 years of showmanship, congratulations received from Prime Minister Robert Hawke and NSW Premier Neville Wran
- 1985: Motion Picture Distributors Association notes that 27 rural screens closed in one year
- 1987: Amusu used by Hoyts Entertainment & Media as the location for a promotional video presented by Good Morning Australia host, John Barton.
- 1993: Allan Tom awarded an Order of Australia Medal for services to Manildra and outlying communities
- 1993: Allan Tom noted as the oldest living member of original band of picture show men who toured NSW
- 1992: Allan Tom retires as the NRMA's oldest patrolman, aged 90 and being the State's oldest licence holder
- 1994: 6 May Allan Tom runs his last film
- 1995: 20 May Allan Tom dies of a stroke at age 93; daughter and son-in-law, Lyn & Jeff Woodhart, take over running the Amusu
- As at May 1999 Amusu still opened on Saturday nights and for special groups
- 2003: Cabonne Shire Council takes over the theatre and adjacent garage
- July 2020: After shutting for five months during the coronavirus lockdown, the Amusu Theatre in Manildra will open its doors to the public.

== Description ==
The Amusu Theatre has an Art Deco-style facade featuring a distinctive stepped parapet typical of that found within many small country towns. Within the two story high fibro facade is featured a small central sash window. Within the upper sash is the word "Amusu" in decorative lead light coloured glass.

Behind the facade is an industrial hall constructed from corrugated iron for the walls and gable end roof. The upper portion of the building, facing the street, houses the first floor projection room, inclusive of its historic working equipment.

The interior of the hall contains original fixtures and fittings, c. 1930s - ticket office, geometric light shades, flip-up sprung leather seats (including twin "love" seats), embossed tin lined projection room, two c. 1936 Westrex projectors, plaster mouldings, on the stage linked "A" and "T" symbols of the theatre, and around the walls various exhibits, such as movie posters from the 1930s to 1990s, old 33 inch sound records, original projectors and paraphernalia from the times of Allan Tom's "travelling picture show".

The theatre evokes a unique atmosphere with its sloping timber floor, seating and c. 1930s features. This atmosphere is enhanced by screenings of archival footage of cartoons and newsreels, c. 1940s, in addition to commercial current releases on Saturday nights.

The theatre has never received remodelling in the conventional sense, but was routinely upgraded over the years within its original style - that of an unadorned, rather plain country hall-type cinema with some art deco elements. Although Allan Tom was always keen on new innovation - cinemascope screen, better sound equipment, etc., the retired models were kept for display within the theatre.

The structure of the theatre was reported as generally sound as at 27 August 2010, although leaks in the roofing iron had caused ceiling damage and the seating needed re-upholstery. Some rewiring and service upgrading had been undertaken for a fire safety audit in 1990.

The equipment continues to be in working order. The building and its interior has remained largely uncharged since its construction.

== Heritage listing ==
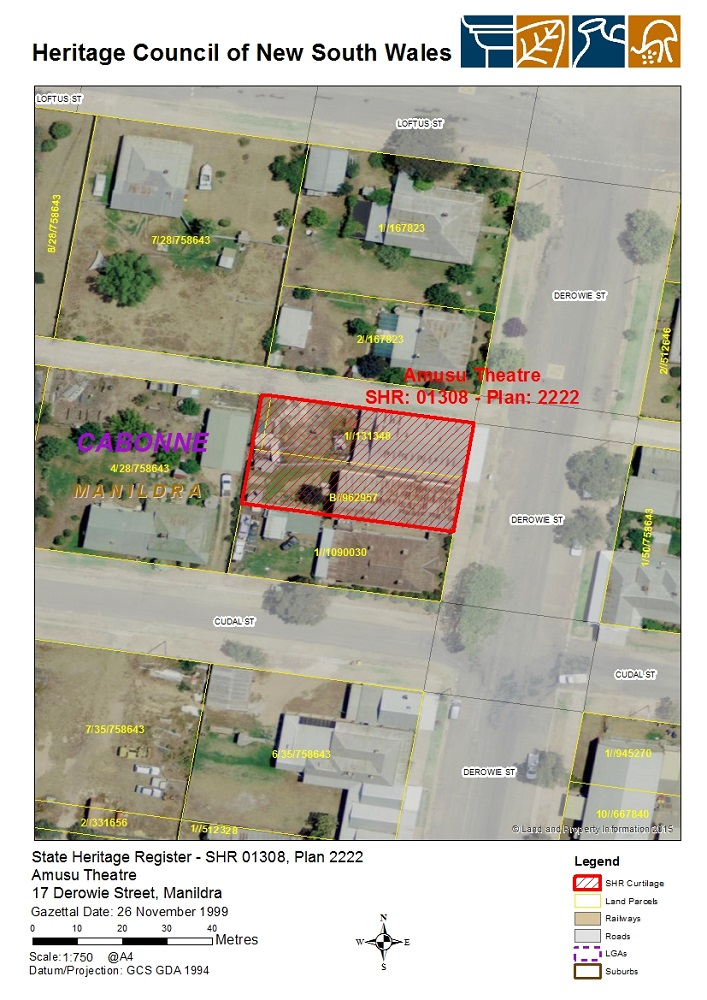
Heritage boundaries

The Amusu Theatre is an important example of a small half-hall purpose-built cinema in a rural town with a very small population, which has been continuously operated under the one ownership since its construction in 1936. [The ownership has changed to the council since the building was heritage-listed.]

The cinema is a link with the earliest days of the movie industry, especially those in rural Australia, throughout the 20th century. The building contains a collection of movie memorabilia.

Amusu Theatre was listed on the New South Wales State Heritage Register on 26 November 1999 having satisfied the following criteria.

The place is important in demonstrating the course, or pattern, of cultural or natural history in New South Wales.

The Amusu is a living icon of the importance in the course and pattern of NSW's cultural history that was played, and continues to play by, film and cinemas. The Amusu has direct association with the life and work of Allan Tom, the travelling picture show man, whose contribution throughout the bulk of the 20th Century to NSW cultural life was recognised by the award of the OAM. Few other cinemas in NSW have operated continuously since construction, in this case 1936. Member of pioneer family with direct links to squatting, sheep runs and first discovery of gold at Ophir; association with the evolution of the movie and cinema industry in Australia from the silent era to the 1990s; known as "The travelling picture show man".

Possibly no other continuously operating picture theatre has such historical - albeit historic connotations with its association with a person of Alan Tom's background as a travelling picture show man [from 1923], and being recognised with an AM for his contribution to entertainment in Australia.

The place is important in demonstrating aesthetic characteristics and/or a high degree of creative or technical achievement in New South Wales.

The theatre's small but slightly pretentious facade is an important and recognised part of the streetscape of its small community.

The place has a strong or special association with a particular community or cultural group in New South Wales for social, cultural or spiritual reasons.

The Amusu has been associated with the social and cultural life of communities in central and western New South Wales. It has provided social and cinematic entertainment to its community for over sixty years. When on the road, the Amusu Touring Talkies provides entertainment in the surrounding region. The theatre has remained under the ownership pf the same family for much of its history an dretains historical records, film booking documents and cinema memorabilia, records of purchase amd film bookings for such a long period.

The place has potential to yield information that will contribute to an understanding of the cultural or natural history of New South Wales.

The Amusu has potential to yield information that will contribute to an understanding of NSW's cultural history and the role of cinemas. The Amusu's importance lies in its ability to demonstrate a high degree of creative or technical achievement in adaptation of then new technologies to harsher conditions within rural NSW. Few cinemas in NSW apart from the Amusu, have arc-lamp projectors dating from the 1930s and 1940s in operational condition (although a number have had them dormant for many years in closed projection boxes). The building and its contents demonstrates how cinematography developed throughout the 20th century. The still operating equipment is a valuable resource, and retains the ability to play various mediums where such machinery is becoming increasingly harder to procure; collection of cinema objects, once common place, are becoming scarce. Wrapped up in the Amusu is a host of memories and events that made it the social hub of such country towns of the day. The place is very evocative and by just being within the building, people can easily image and experience what it was like to go to the movies in the 1930s.

The place possesses uncommon, rare or endangered aspects of the cultural or natural history of New South Wales.

The Amusu possesses uncommon, rare and endangered aspects of NSW cultural history being a rare surviving purpose built, corrugated iron building with continuous use since being built and by the same family. Although once common place throughout Urban and Regional NSW, early 20th century theatre structures are becoming rare, whether grand 1000 seat or 300 seat capacities. This is especially so when coupled with one still being used for its original purpose. The continuous operation of the Amusu as a cinema, run by the same family, inclusive of its original fixtures and fittings, is rare. The combination of its building materials, its continuous use and by the same historic family with all the moveable heritage items largely intact, as a total package the Amusu is unique [Thorn 1999].

The place is important in demonstrating the principal characteristics of a class of cultural or natural places/environments in New South Wales.

The Amusu's importance is contained within its ability to demonstrate the principal characteristics of cinemas as a class of NSW cultural places and the collection of memorabilia and records which traces its life over the last 63 years.

15 halls of entertainment (including Schools of Arts and open air theatres) are listed within Cabonne LGA. Of these 9 were purpose built but only the Amusu continues to operate in its original state and has a category 1 classification. Within the Central Tablelands and Central West Region of NSW 64 such structures are listed in Thorn et al. Of these four (4) are cited as having the highest category 1 rating, being the Amusu, The Palace in Parks (which has been adapted for another use), the Empire/Australia in Orange (which has since been converted into multiple smaller modern theatrettes in 1997) and Strand in Orange (which has been adapted to another use). In terms of fabric, the Victoria Theatre in Newcastle dates from the 1890s although its decor is of 1921.
