= Tullamore (disambiguation) =

Tullamore is a town in County Offaly, Ireland.

Tullamore may also refer to:

- Tullamore, New South Wales, Australia, a small town
  - Tullamore Show (NSW), an agricultural show in the NSW town
- Tullamore, Ontario, Canada, a semi-rural community
- Sarah Tullamore, English singer

== Associated with the Irish town ==
- Tullamore Town F.C., a football (soccer) club
- Baron Tullamore, a title in the Peerage of Ireland
- King's County Tullamore, a parliamentary division
- Tullamore railway station
- Tullamore Show, an agricultural show
