= Nangar National Park =

National park in New South Wales, Australia

- IUCN category II (national park)
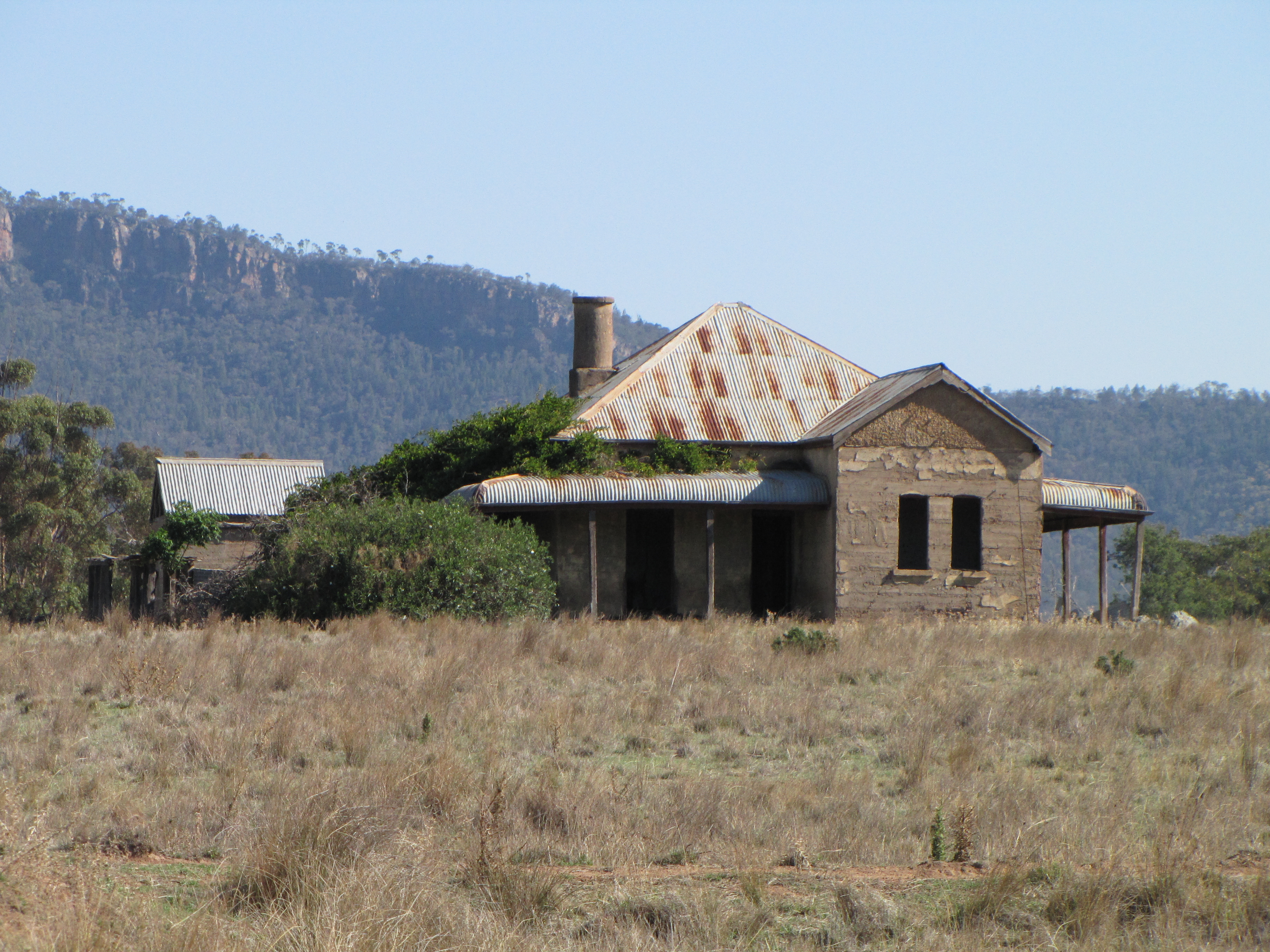
- An abandoned homestead at Murga in front of the cliffs of Nangar National Park, as seen from the Escort Way

- Location within New South Wales
- Location: New South Wales
- Nearest city: Eugowra
- Coordinates: 33°25′32″S 148°30′15″E
- Area: 94 km^{2} (36 sq mi)
- Established: 1983
- Governing body: NSW National Parks & Wildlife Service

Nangar is a national park in located New South Wales, Australia, 252 kilometres (157 mi) west of Sydney. The park is located in the Nangar-Murga Range between Eugowra and Canowindra. It features Nangar Mountain, which rises to 778 metres (2,552 ft) AHD.

Trees consist of eucalyptus, black pine, scribbly gum and ironbark. Shrubs include spider flowers, thyme spurge, nodding blue lily and waxlip orchids.

Birds recorded include wrens, thornbills, falcons, hawks, peregrine falcons and glossy black cockatoos. Eastern grey kangaroos and grey, redneck and swamp wallabies are common.

The park was originally established in 1983 when 1,550 hectares (3,800 acres) of bushland were declared a national park. "Dripping Rock" was added to the park in 1988 and, in 1994, the Nangar State Forest was added to the park to expand its size to 9,196 hectares (22,720 acres). Dripping Rock was a grazing property established in 1928 and named after a local seasonal waterfall. The original Dripping Rock homestead was converted to a shearing shed and a new homestead, built in 1935, was destroyed by a bushfire in September 2009.

== See also ==
- Protected areas of New South Wales
