= Tottenham station =

Tottenham station may refer to:

- Tottenham railway station in Victoria, Australia
- Tottenham Court Road station in London, England
- Tottenham Hale station in London, England
- Tottenham station on the Bogan Gate–Tottenham railway line in New South Wales, Australia
- Tottenham station on the South Simcoe Railway in Ontario, Canada
