= Murga, New South Wales =

Murga
- Town
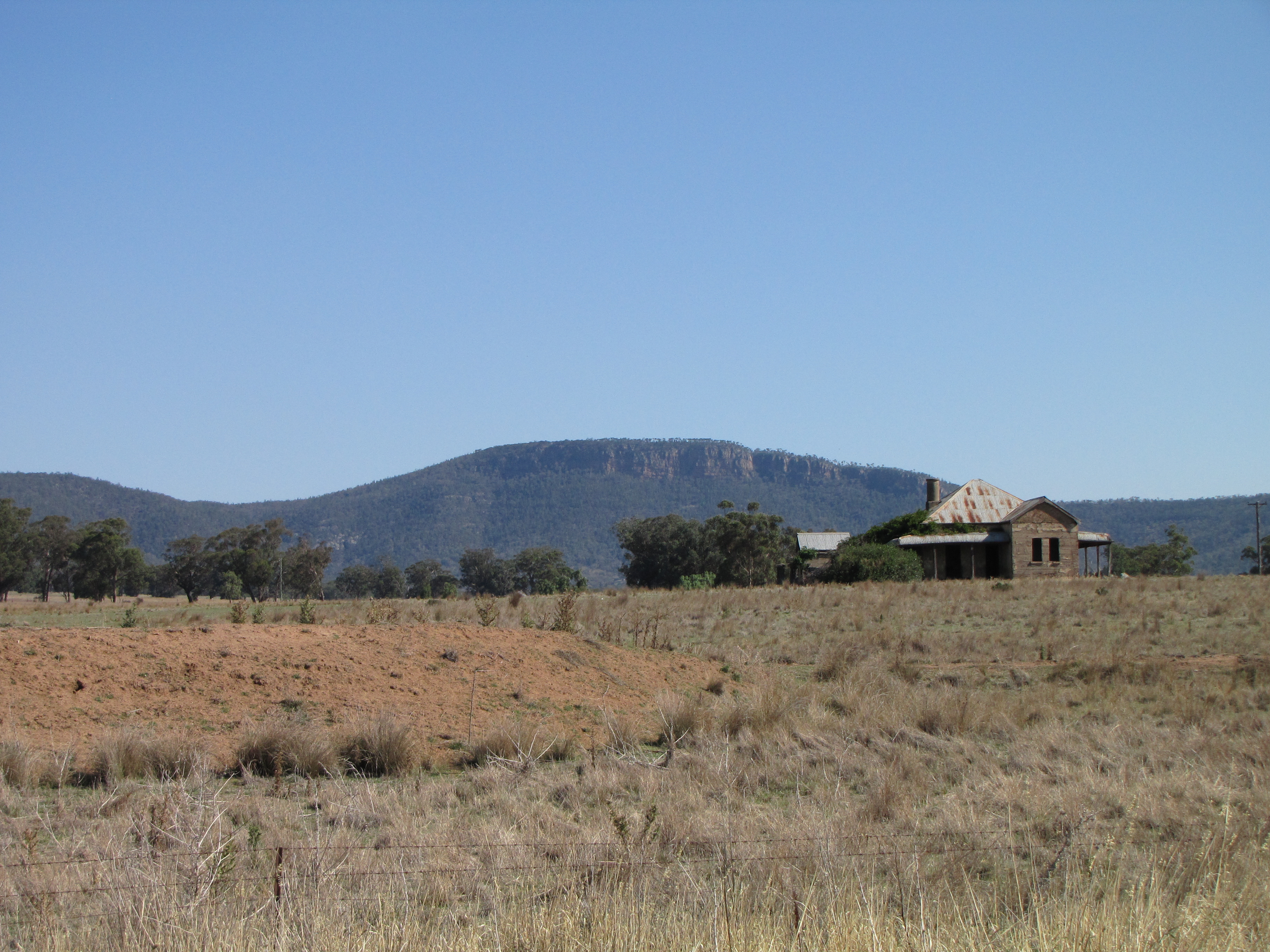
- An abandoned homestead at Murga in front of the cliffs of Nangar National Park, as seen from the Escort Way

- Coordinates: 33°36′0″S 148°55′0″E
- Country: Australia
- State: New South Wales
- LGA: Cabonne Shire Council
- Location: 320 km (200 mi) W of Sydney; 70 km (43 mi) W of Orange; 45 km (28 mi) E of Forbes

Government
  - State electorate: Orange
  - Federal division: Calare

Population
  - Total: 199 (2006 census)
- Postcode: 2864

Murga is a former town in the Central West region of New South Wales, Australia. The former town is located in the Cabonne Shire local government area, 320 kilometres (199 mi) west of the state capital, Sydney. At the 2006 census, Murga locality had a population of 199.

Murga was once a stop at the Cobb and Co stagecoach line from Orange to Forbes. It was located below the cliffs of the Nangar Range, now the Nangar National Park, along the Mandagery Creek. By 1862 the town had a population of 100 people. With the end of the stagecoach era the town dwindled but remained a timber milling centre with its own school, which operated between December 1879 and November 1966, with three lengthy interruptions. Today nothing remains of Murga but the old post office which is now a private home.
