= Escort Way =

Escort Way New South Wales
- Coordinates: 33.274036°S 149.086081°E (East end); 33.390140°S 148.014967°E (West end)

General information
- Type: Rural road
- Length: 114.1 km (71 mi)
- Gazetted: August 1928
- Route number(s): B81 (2013–present) (Boree–Cudal)
- Former route number: State Route 81 (1974–2013) (Boree–Cudal); State Route 90 (1974–2013) (Boree–Orange)

Major junctions
- East end: Mitchell Highway; Orange, New South Wales
- Peabody Road; Henry Parkes Way; Canowindra Road
- West end: Lachlan Valley Way; Forbes, New South Wales

Location(s)
- Major settlements: Cudal, Eugowra

Escort Way is a 114-kilometre (71 mi) country road in New South Wales running from Mitchell Highway in Orange to Lachlan Valley Way in Forbes. The name derives from the notorious hold up of the Lachlan Gold Escort by bushrangers in 1862 which occurred along the route, and subsequent lobbying by the Canowindra Historical Society to recognise this. Escort Rock, a heritage-listed geological formation is located adjacent to the road near Eugowra.

== Route ==
Escort Way commences at the intersection with Mitchell Highway at Orange in the east and heads in a westerly direction, intersecting with Henry Parkes Way in Boree, and passing through the towns of Cudal and Eugowra, before it ends at an intersection with Lachlan Valley Way at Forbes.

== History ==
The passing of the Main Roads Act of 1924 through the Parliament of New South Wales provided for the declaration of Main Roads, roads partially funded by the State government through the Main Roads Board (later the Department of Main Roads, and eventually Transport for NSW). Main Road No. 61 was declared along this road on 8 August 1928, from Forbes via Eugowra and Cudal to the intersection with North-Western Highway (today Mitchell Highway) at Orange) (and continuing west to Condobolin). With the passing of the Main Roads (Amendment) Act of 1929 to provide for additional declarations of State Highways and Trunk Roads, this was amended to Trunk Road 61 on 8 April 1929.

Trunk Road 61 was re-aligned to run between Orange and Condobolin via Parkes on 6 April 1938; its former alignment between Condobolin via Eugowra and Cudal to Boree was replaced by Main Road 377.

Heavy lobbying from the Canowindra Historical Society commenced in 1979 for a name change and appropriate signage, which eventually proved successful: the route - from Orange to Forbes, along Trunk Road 61 and Main Road 377 - was officially gazetted as (The) Escort Way on 24 October 1986; the definite article appears to have been dropped not long afterwards.

The passing of the Roads Act of 1993 updated road classifications and the way they could be declared within New South Wales. Under this act, Escort Way today retains its declaration as parts of Main Roads 61 and 377, from Orange to Forbes.

Escort Way was signed State Route 90 between Orange and Boree in 1974, with a concurrency with State Route 81 between Boree and Cudal. With the conversion to the newer alphanumeric system in 2013, State Route 90 was removed and not replaced, and the concurrency with State Route 81 was replaced with route B81.

== Major intersections ==
LGA	Location	km	mi	Destinations	Notes
Orange	Orange	0.0	0.0	Mitchell Highway (A32) – Bathurst, Molong	Eastern terminus of Escort Way, which runs west as Forbes Road
Orange	Orange	1.5	0.93	Northern Distributor Road – Orange	Road name changes to Escort Way
Cabonne	Boree	25.7	16.0	Peabody Road (B81 north) – Molong	Eastern terminus of concurrency with route B81
Cabonne	Boree	28.6	17.8	Henry Parkes Way – Manildra, Parkes	
Cabonne	Cudal	37.2	23.1	Canowindra Road (B81 south) – Canowindra, Cowra	Western terminus of concurrency with route B81
Cabonne	Cudal	38.0	23.6	Kurrajong Road – Manildra	
Cabonne	Eugowra	78.5	48.8	Pye Street, to Nangar Road – Canowindra	Escort Way runs through Eugowra as Broad Street
Cabonne	Eugowra	84.0	52.2	Parkes Eugowra Road – Parkes	
Forbes	Forbes	114.1	70.9	Bridge Street (Lachlan Valley Way) (northwest) – Forbes; Flint Street (Lachlan Valley Way) (south) – Grenfell, Cowra	Western terminus of Escort Way
1.000 mi = 1.609 km; 1.000 km = 0.621 mi: Concurrency terminus; Route transition

== See also ==
- Highways in Australia
- List of highways in New South Wales
