= Tullamore Show (NSW) =

Annual agricultural show in Australia

- Genre: Agricultural and livestock show
- Dates: Second Weekend in August
- Begins: 1918
- Locations: Tullamore Show Ground, Cornet St., Tullamore, New South Wales
- Country: Australia
- Next event: 12th & 13th August 2022
- Website: tullamoreshow.org.au

The Tullamore PA & H Association Inc. Annual show, or Tullamore Show, is a two-day agricultural and livestock show held on the second Saturday of August each year near the township of Tullamore, New South Wales. The 2021 edition was cancelled due to COVID-19 restrictions, and the PA & H was one of a group of agricultural societies to receive organisational support from the national Department of Agriculture, Water and the Environment. There were also no shows in 1940–45.

== Event ==
Apart from the central cattle, sheep and poultry breeding and grooming contests, over the years the event has included horse trials, shearing, sheepdog trial, fine wool, trots, crops, baking, and demolition derbies, and children's arts competitions. A "Miss Showgirl" pageant has been held since 1965.
