= Bogan Gate =

- Town
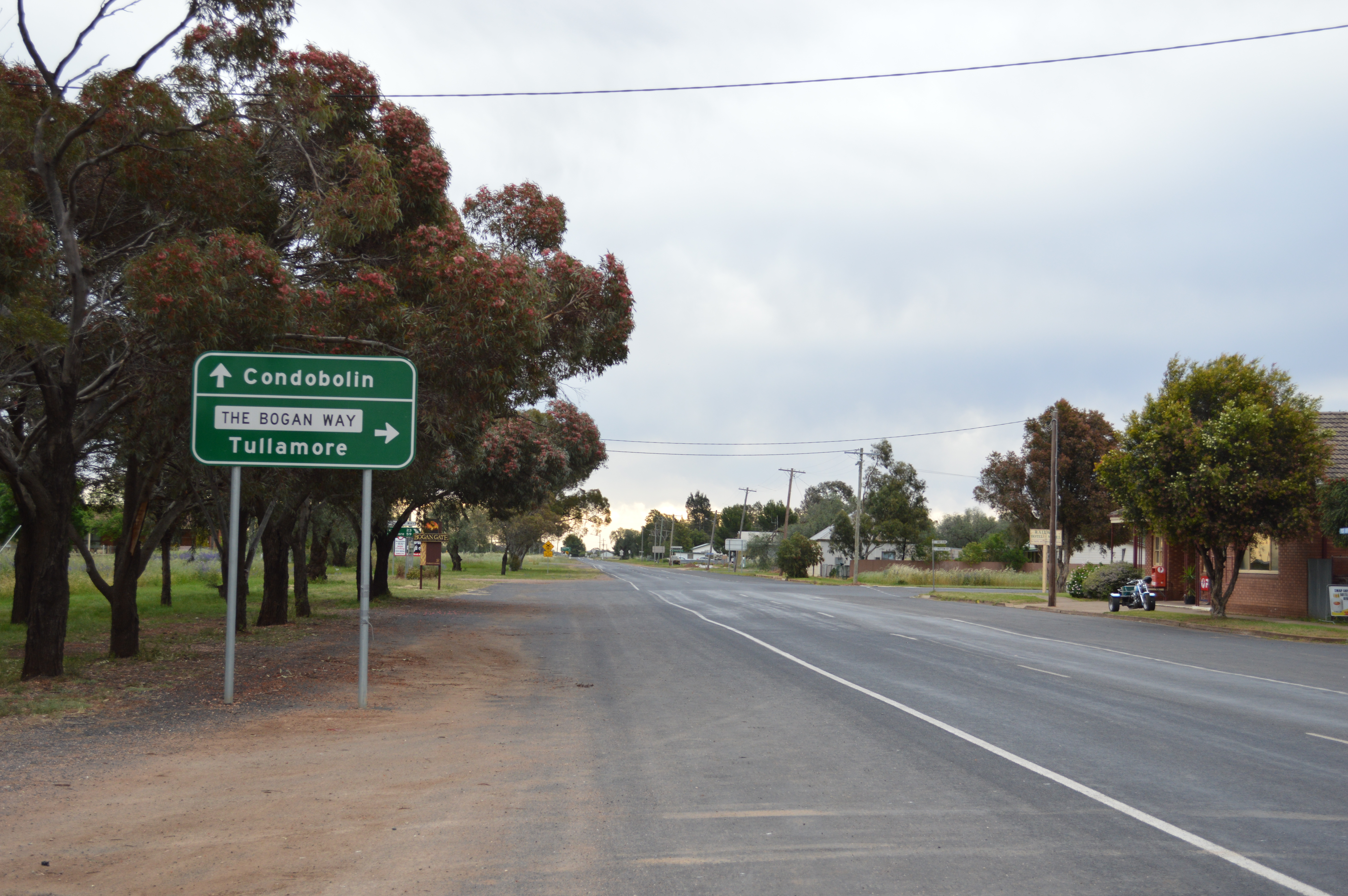
- Main street of Bogan Gate

- Coordinates: 33°07′0″S 147°49′0″E
- Country: Australia
- State: New South Wales
- LGA: Parkes Shire
- Location: 42 km (26 mi) W of Forbes; 189 km (117 mi) SW of Dubbo; 38 km (24 mi) W of Parkes; 65 km (40 mi) E of Condobolin; 392 km (244 mi) W of Sydney

Government
  - State electorate: Orange
  - Federal division: Parkes
- Elevation: 235 m (771 ft)

Population
  - Total: 269 (2021 census)
- Postcode: 2876
- Mean max temp: 48 °C (118 °F)
- Mean min temp: 12 °C (54 °F)

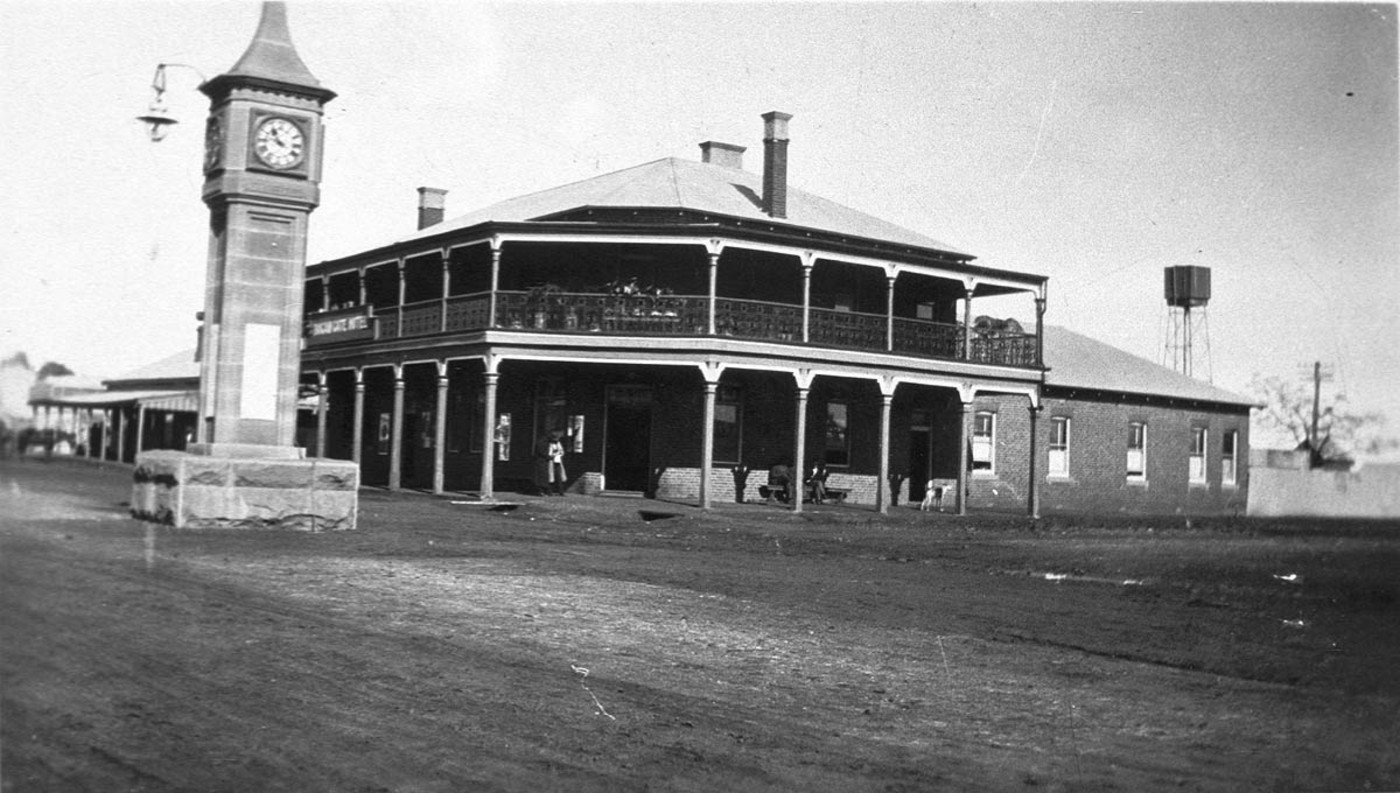
Bogan Gate Hotel before it was destroyed by fire in December 1930

Bogan Gate (/ˈboʊɡən ˈɡeɪt/) is a small village in Parkes Shire of the Central West of New South Wales, Australia. At the 2021 census, Bogan Gate and the surrounding area had a population of 269. Bogan Gate is derived from the local Aboriginal word meaning "the birthplace of a notable headman of the local tribe".

The village lies in wheat and sheep growing country and is on the Sydney - Broken Hill rail line, and it is the junction for the Bogan Gate–Tottenham Branch line.

Attractions include the annual Bogan Gate Arts Festival and golf tournaments at the local nine-hole Bogan Gate Golf Club.

== History ==
=== 19th century ===
Explorer John Oxley passed through the area in 1817. An early reference to the name Bogan Gate is in the New South Wales Government Gazette for 19 May 1876. Tenders were called for the conveyance of mail to Bogan Gate in May 1877. Bogan Gate Post Office opened on 15 December 1896.

The arrival of the railway line late in the 19th century transformed Bogan Gate and agriculture in the region. The western line from Sydney reached Parkes and Forbes in 1893. When it reached the Bogan Gate area in 1896, the settlement moved south to relocate near the railway station. Land for the township was surveyed in 1897 and a public school was built the following year. The railway station was at the heart of the community and busiest during the shearing and harvest times.

The railway made it possible to grow commercial wheat crops in the area. Previously the high cost of transport had made the crop uneconomic in western New South Wales. Also significant in expansion of wheat growing in the region was the practice of share farming, introduced into New South Wales from the United States in 1893.

=== 20th century ===
The town had a spurt of growth in the years immediately after the railway station opened. By 1903, Bogan Gate had a public school with 67 students, a police station, post office, sawmill, general store, butcher, baker, blacksmith and two hotels; the Bogan Gate Hotel (built 1899), which had 17 rooms, and the Railway Hotel.

Bogan Gate had a population of 300 when the Shire of Goobang came into existence in 1906. By the 1920s, there was a general store employing 11 people, stock and station agencies, a bank, a doctor's surgery and another hotel. The Great Depression forced many residents to move in search of work to larger towns and cities.

An explosives testing ground was established near Bogan Gate during World War II. The site was used by the Australian Army and Royal Australian Air Force to store munitions for decades. As of 2014, the former Defence site was leased to several companies.

A monument to honour the early settlers was built in 1997.

=== 21st century ===
Modern Bogan Gate has a public hall, school, Post Office & hotel/motel.

Recreational facilities include Burrawang Park, & a nine-hole golf course and night-lit tennis courts.

A festival, that included a competition to find “Australia’s Biggest Bogan,” was held in the town in July 2019.

== Notable residents ==
- William Keast (1872−1938), politician
- Lu Rees (1901−1983), bookseller and book collector
- Jim Taylor (1920−2005), politician
- Ian Walsh (1933−2013), rugby league player

== Gallery ==
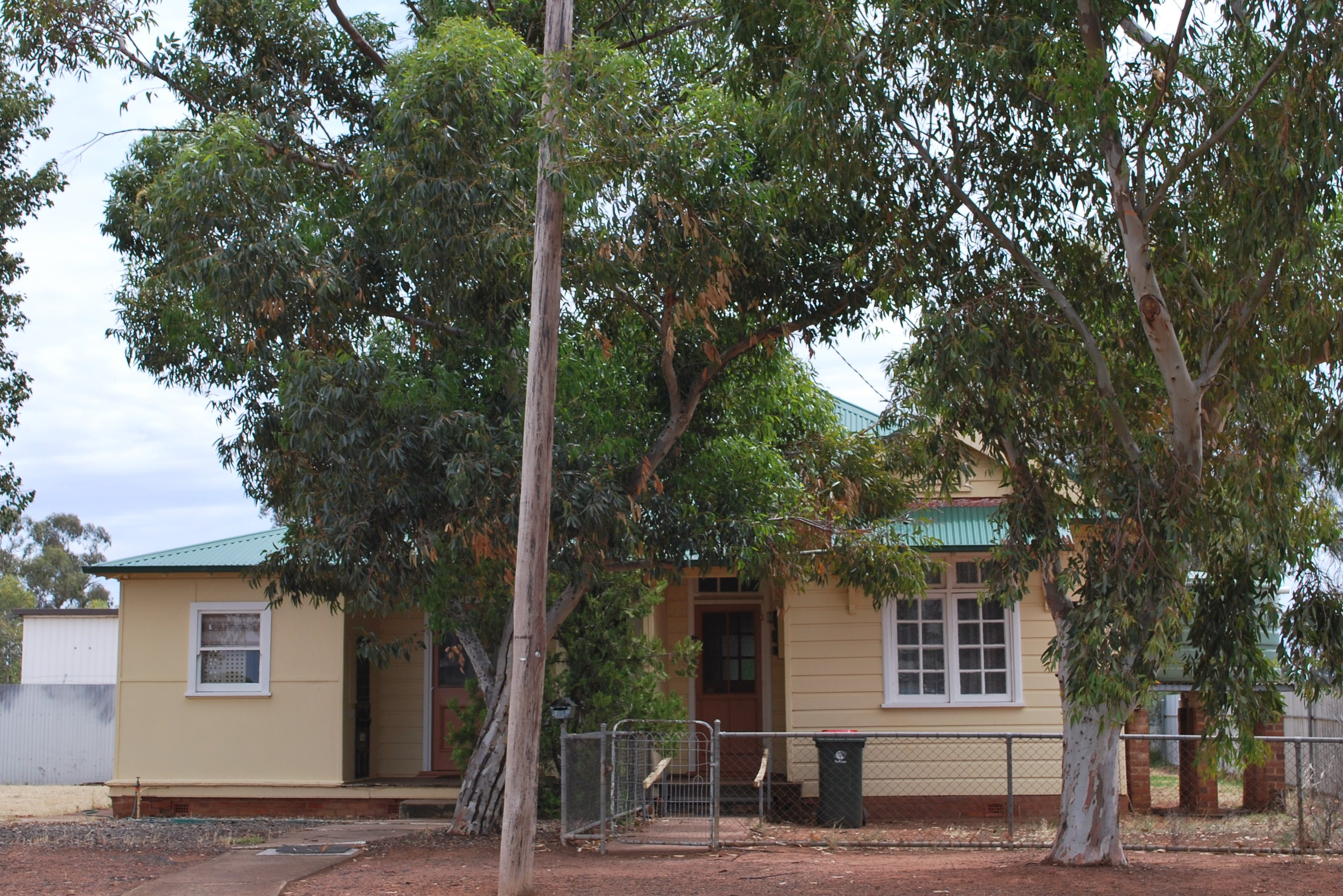
Bogan Gate Post office

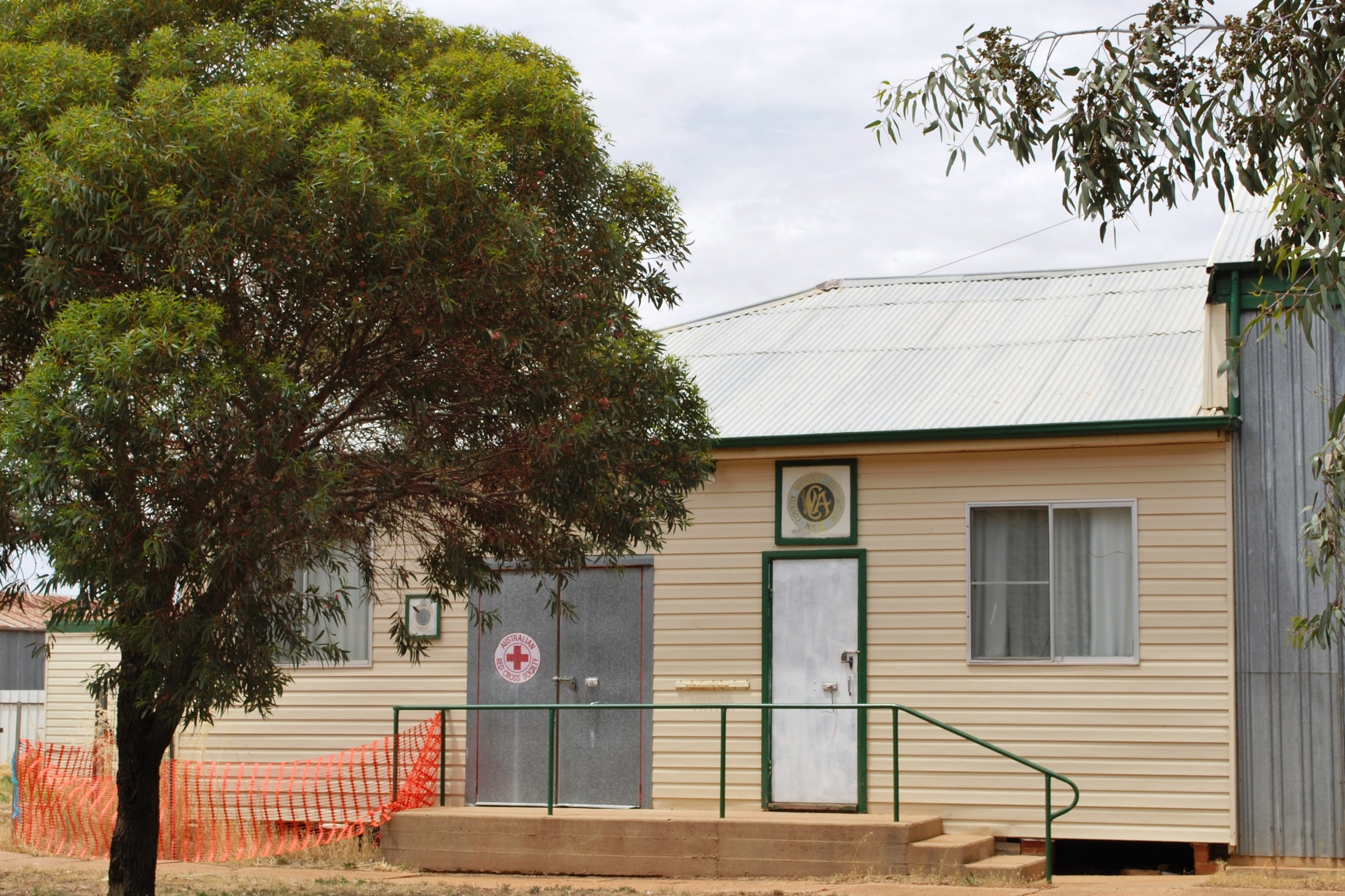
Bogan gate CWA Rooms

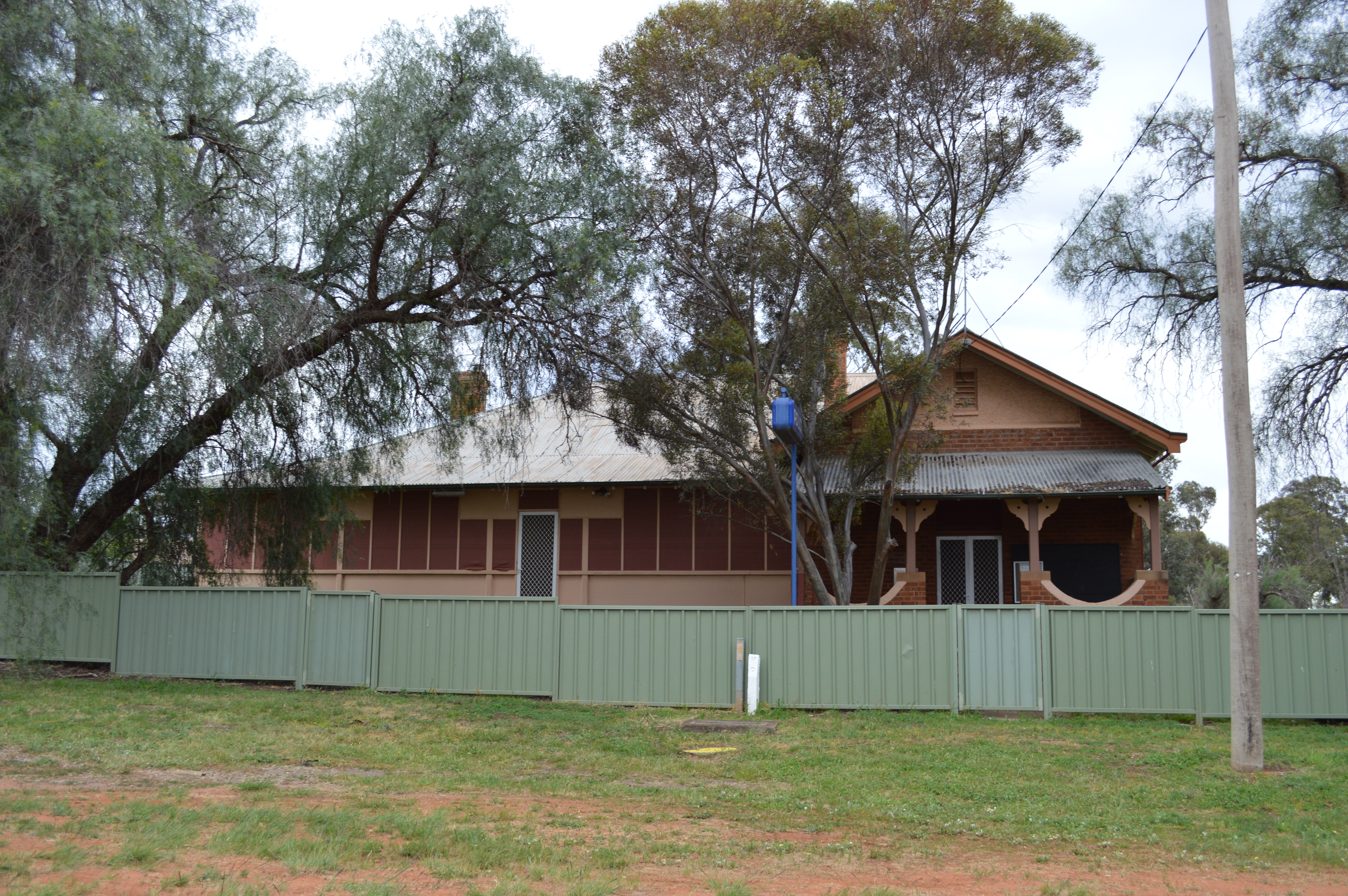
Bogan gate Police Station

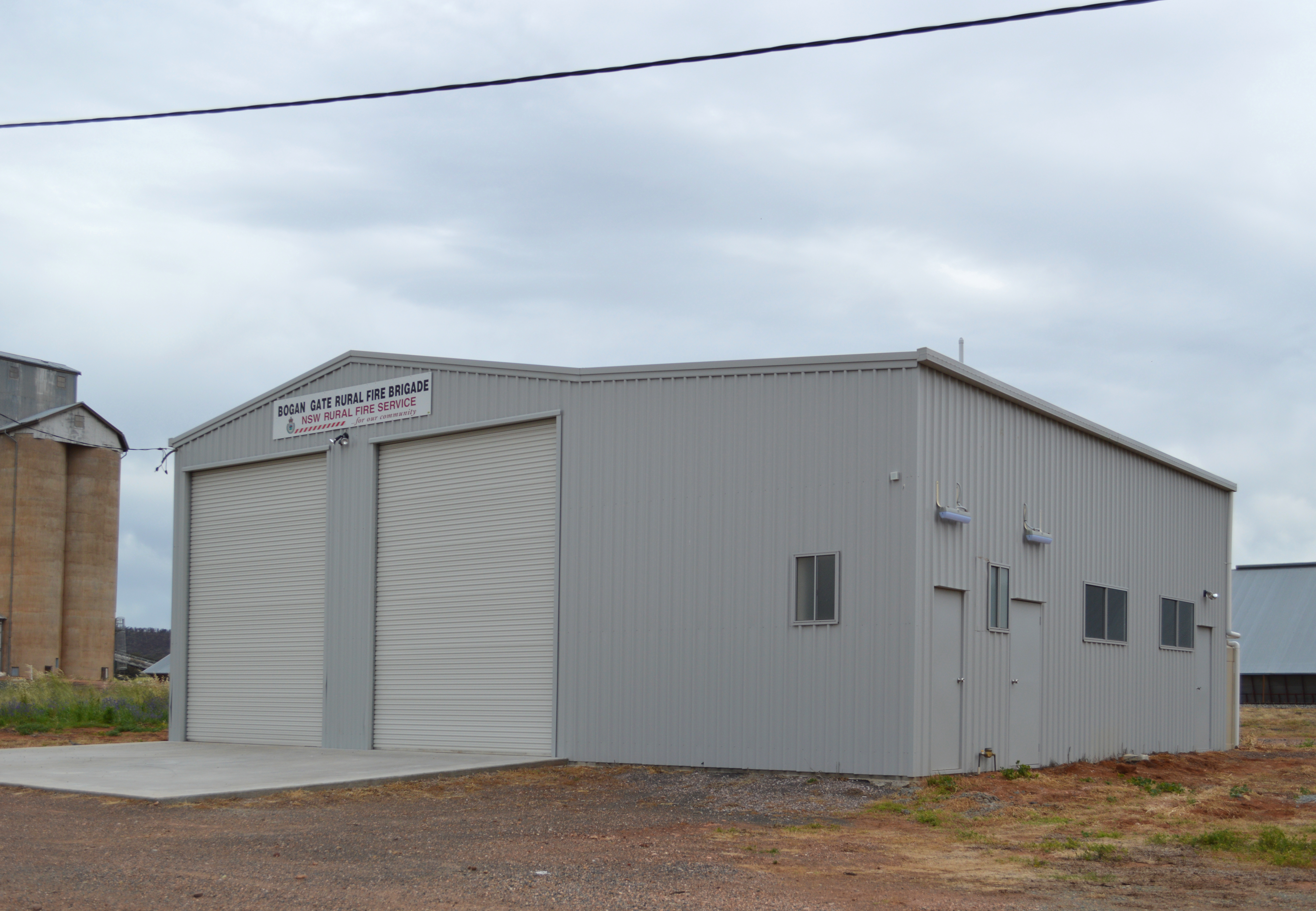
Bogan gate Rural Fire Service

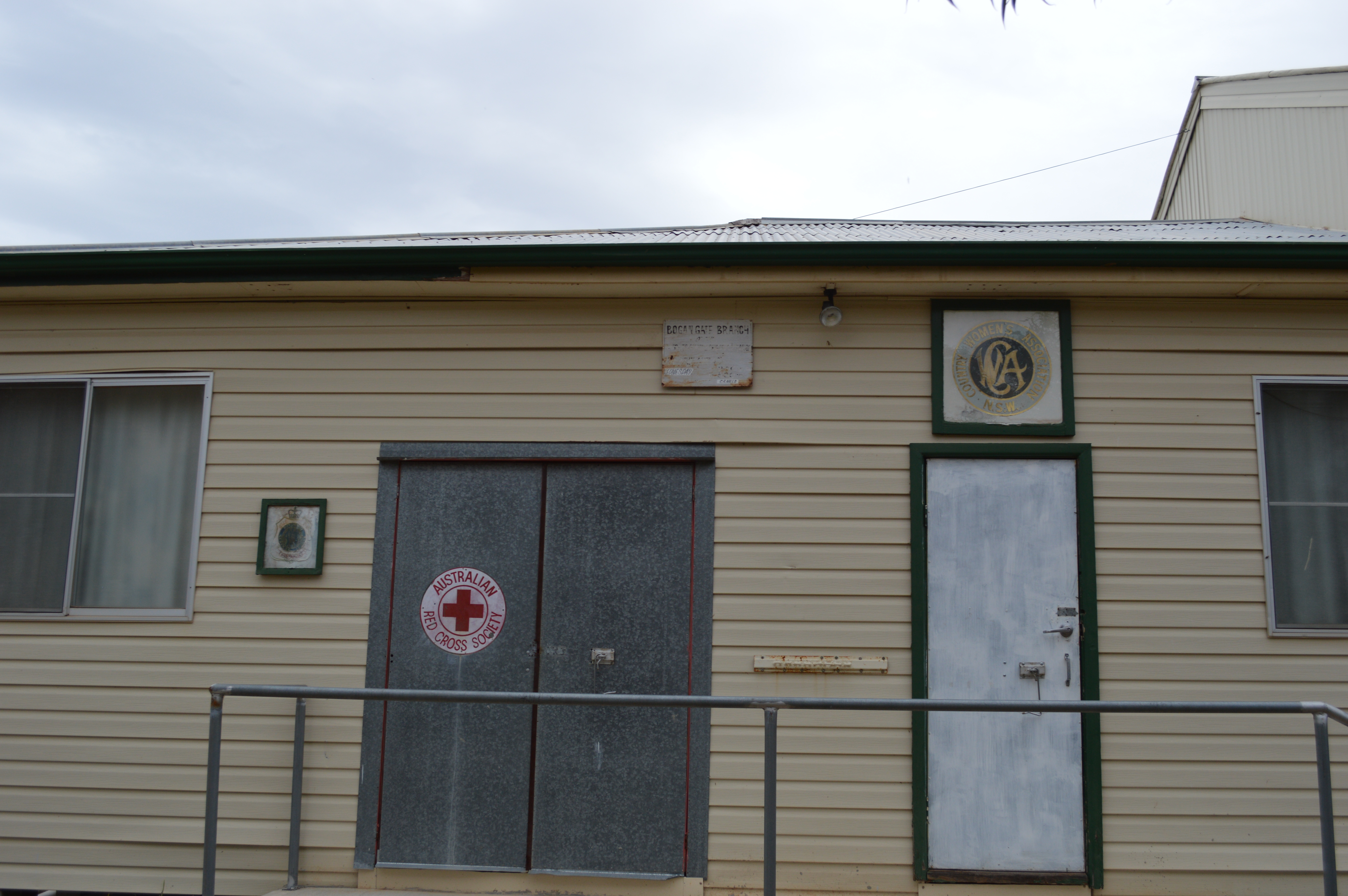
Bogan Gate RSL CWA and Red Cross rooms

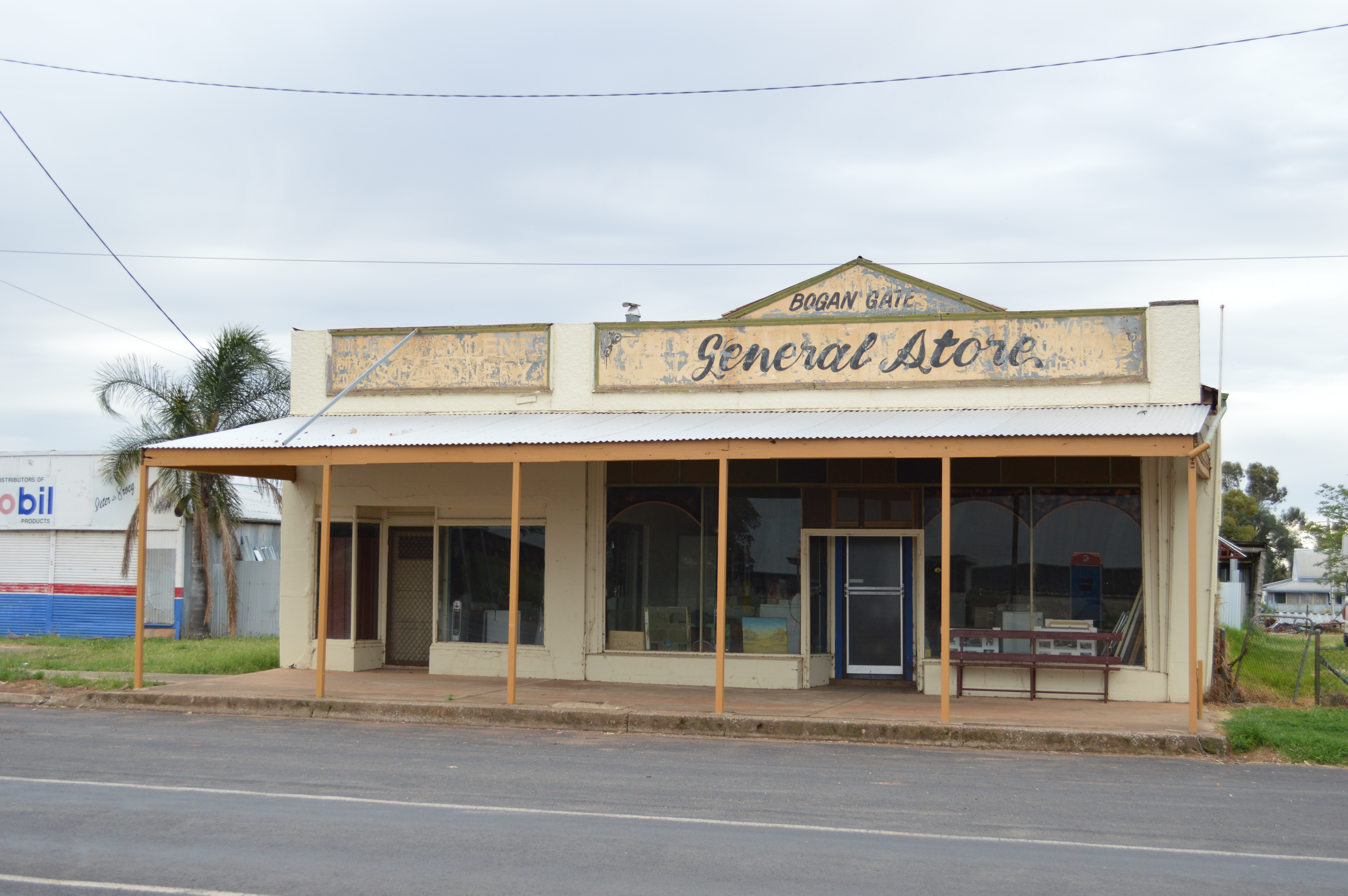
General Store at Bogan gate

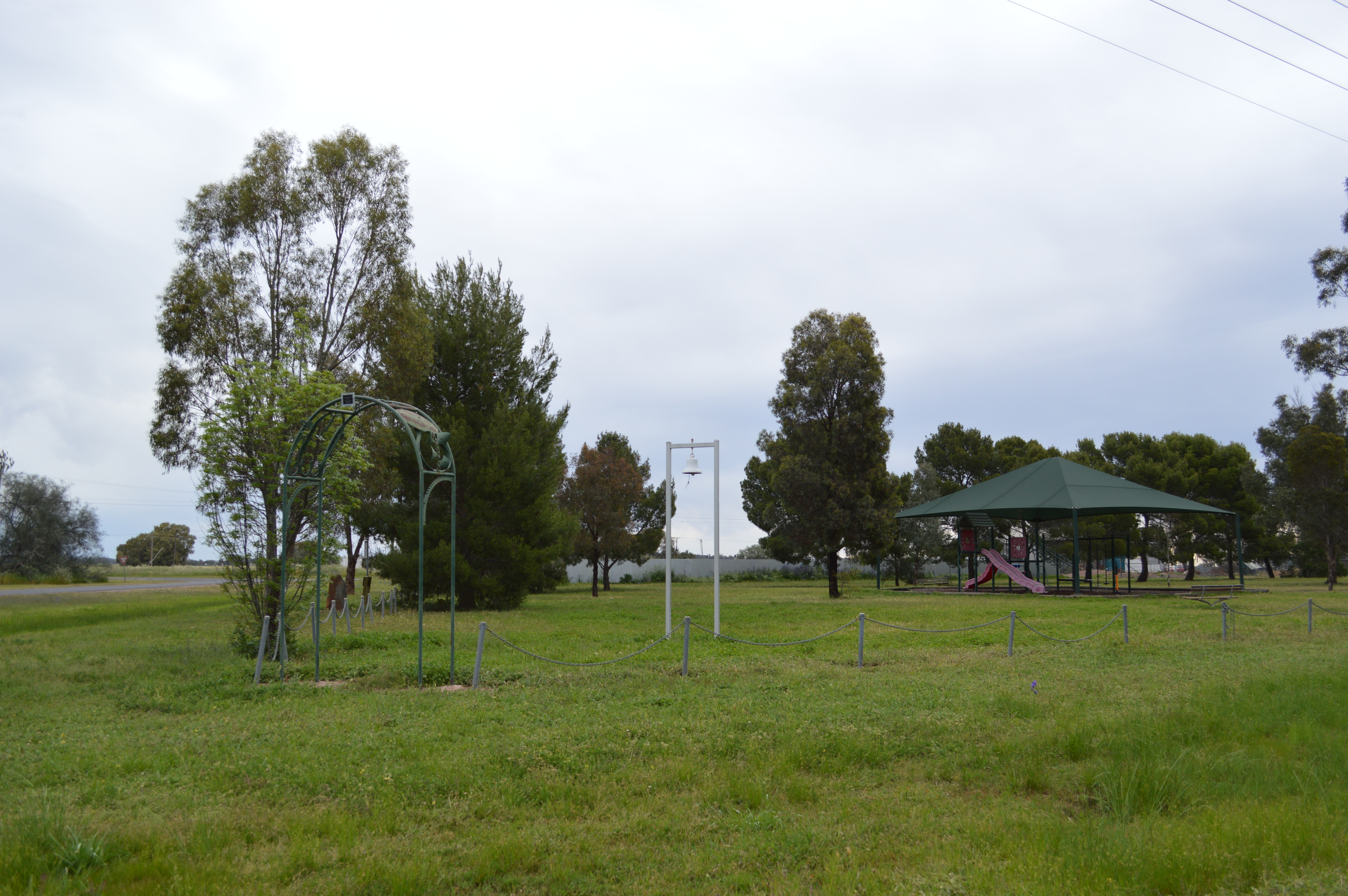
Bogan gate park

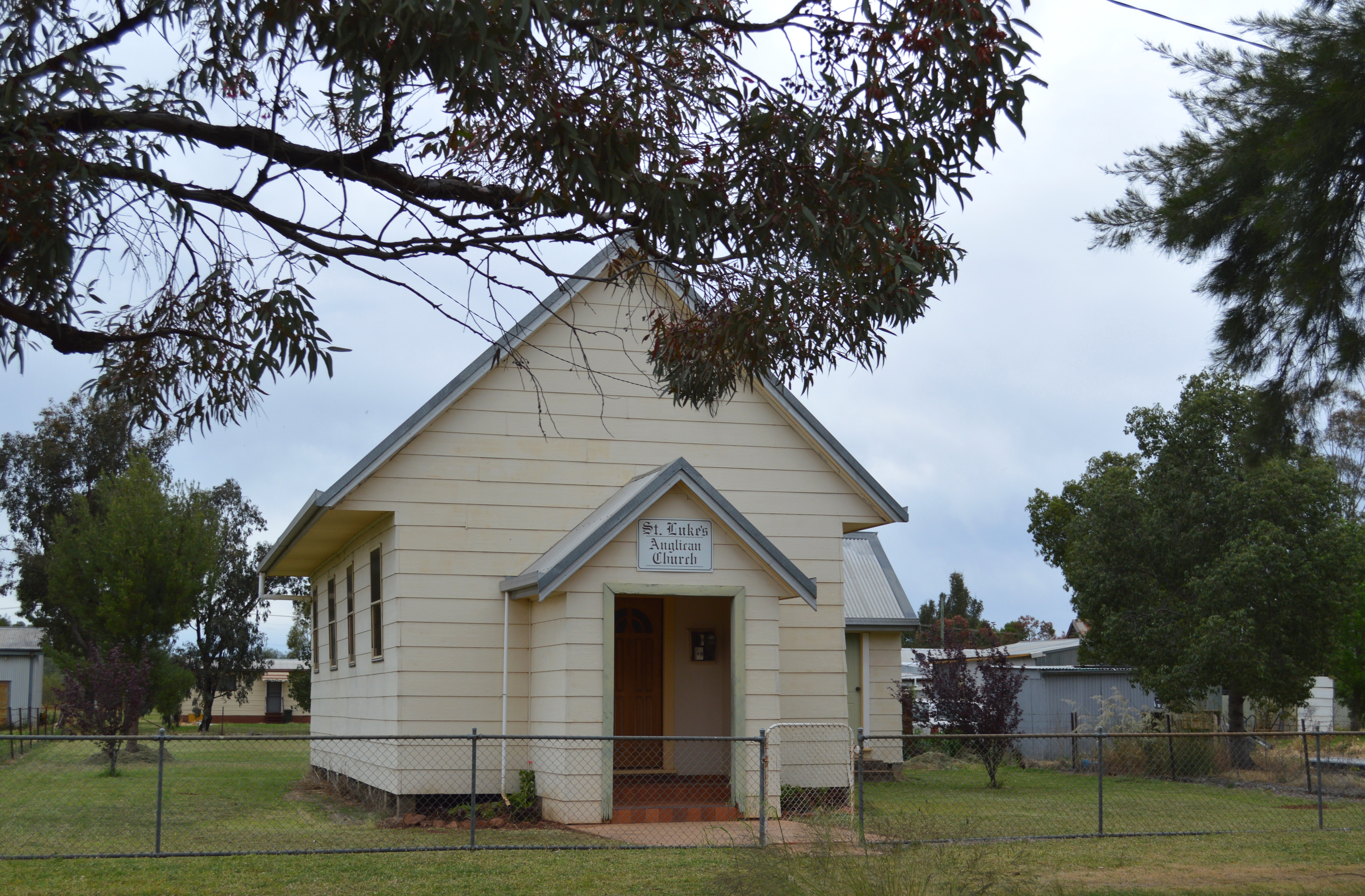
Anglican Church

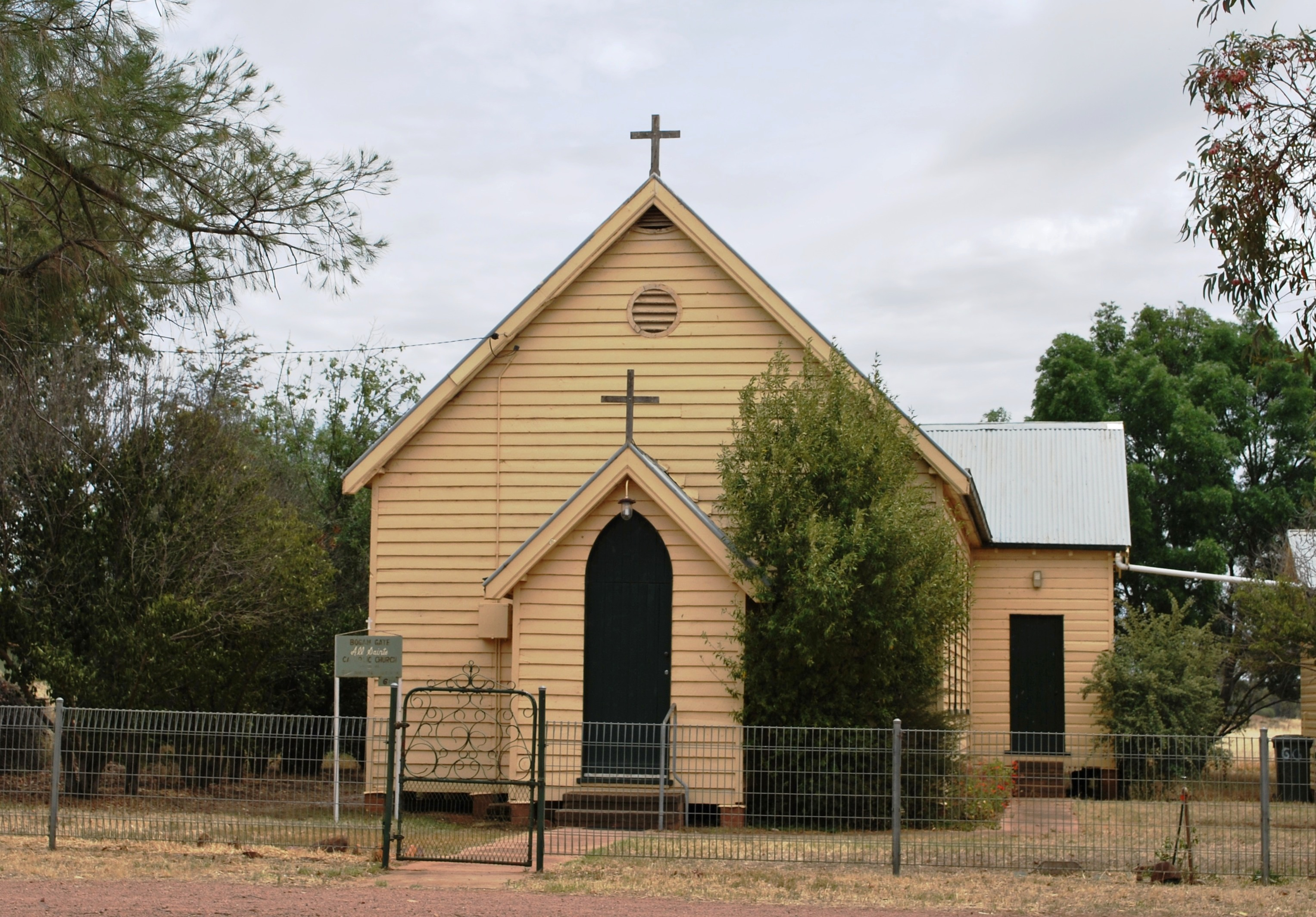
Roman Catholic Church

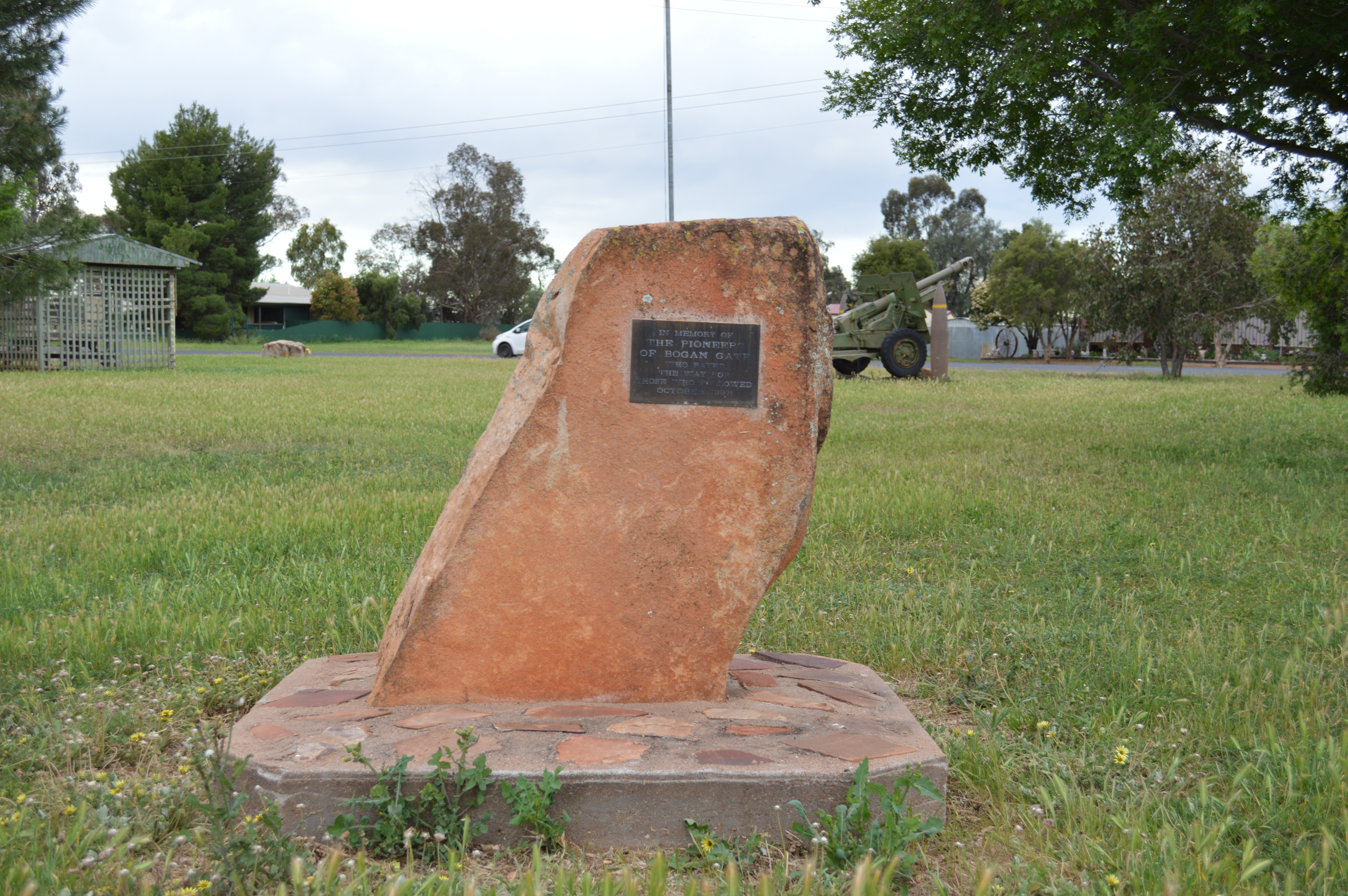
Bogan Gate Pioneer Monument

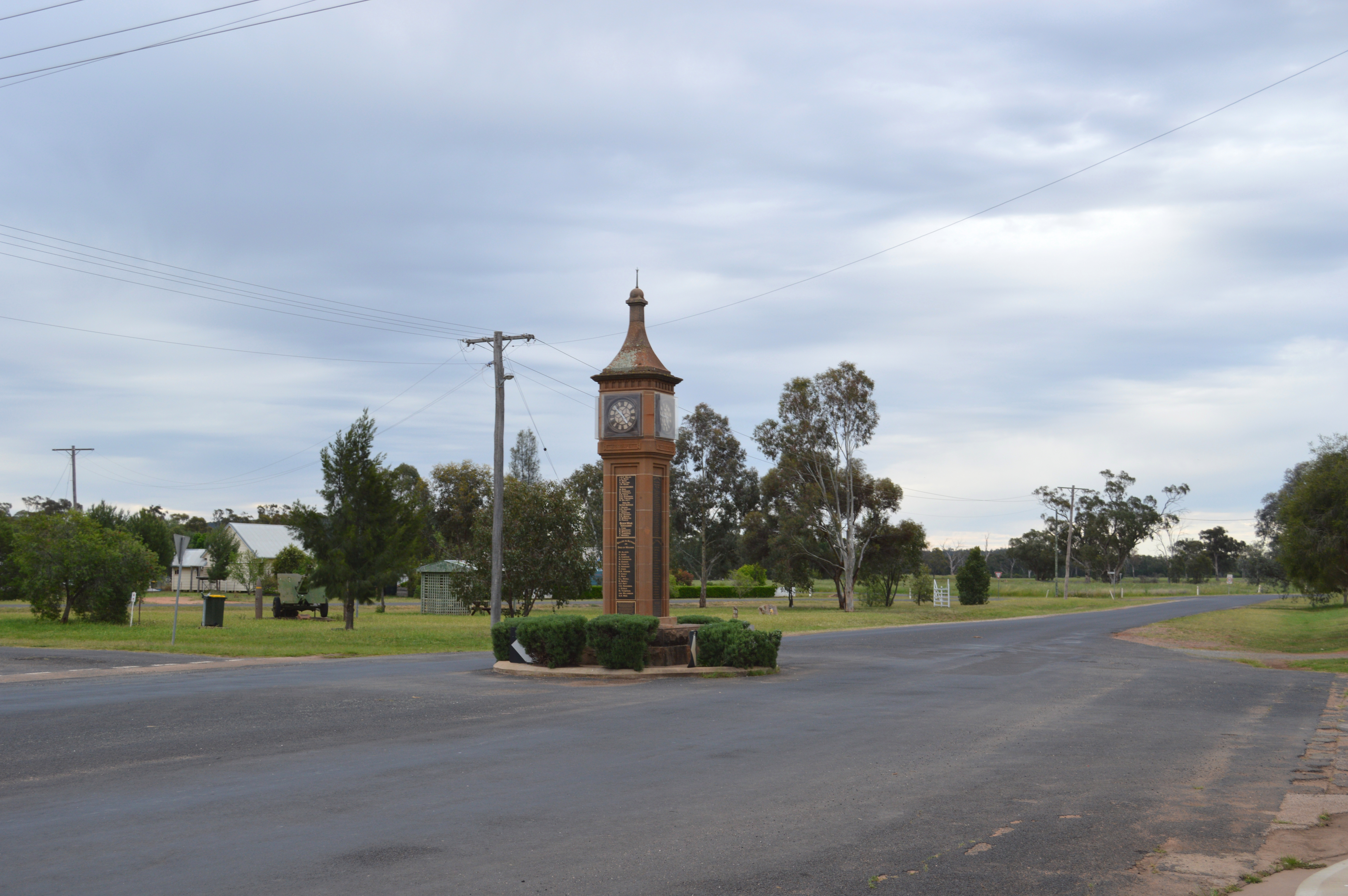
Bogan Gate War Memorial

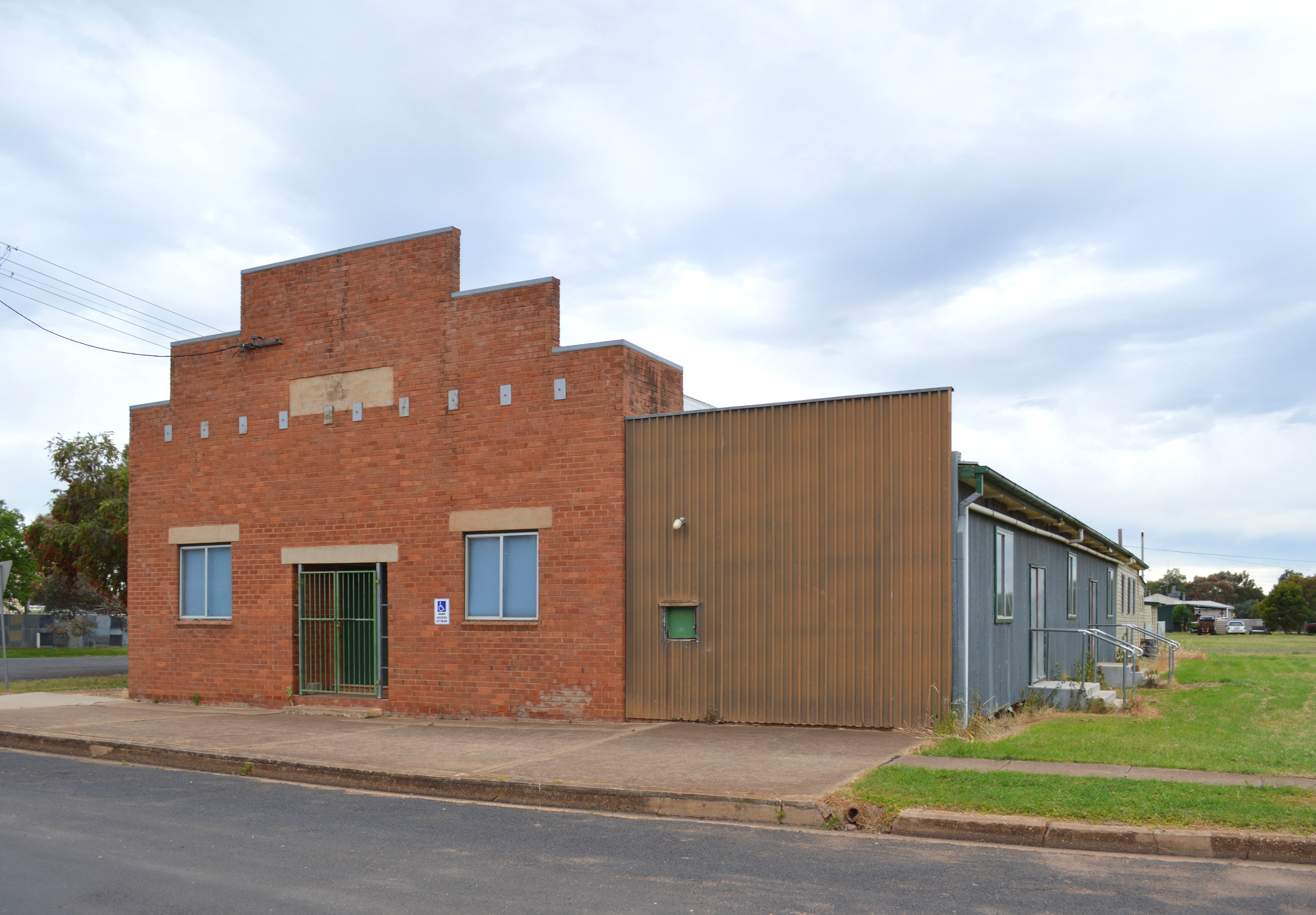
Bogan Gate Public Hall

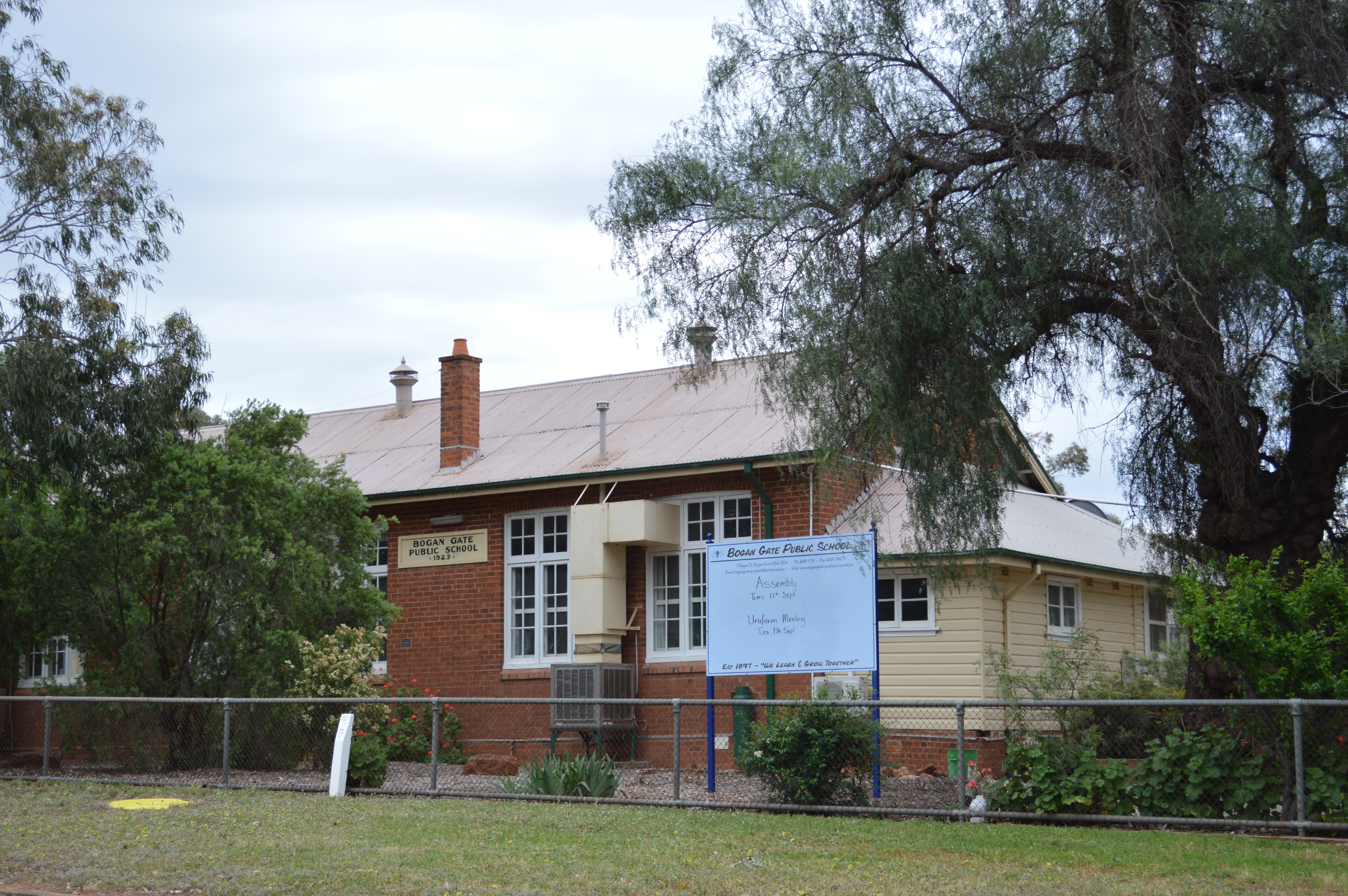
Bogan Gate Public School

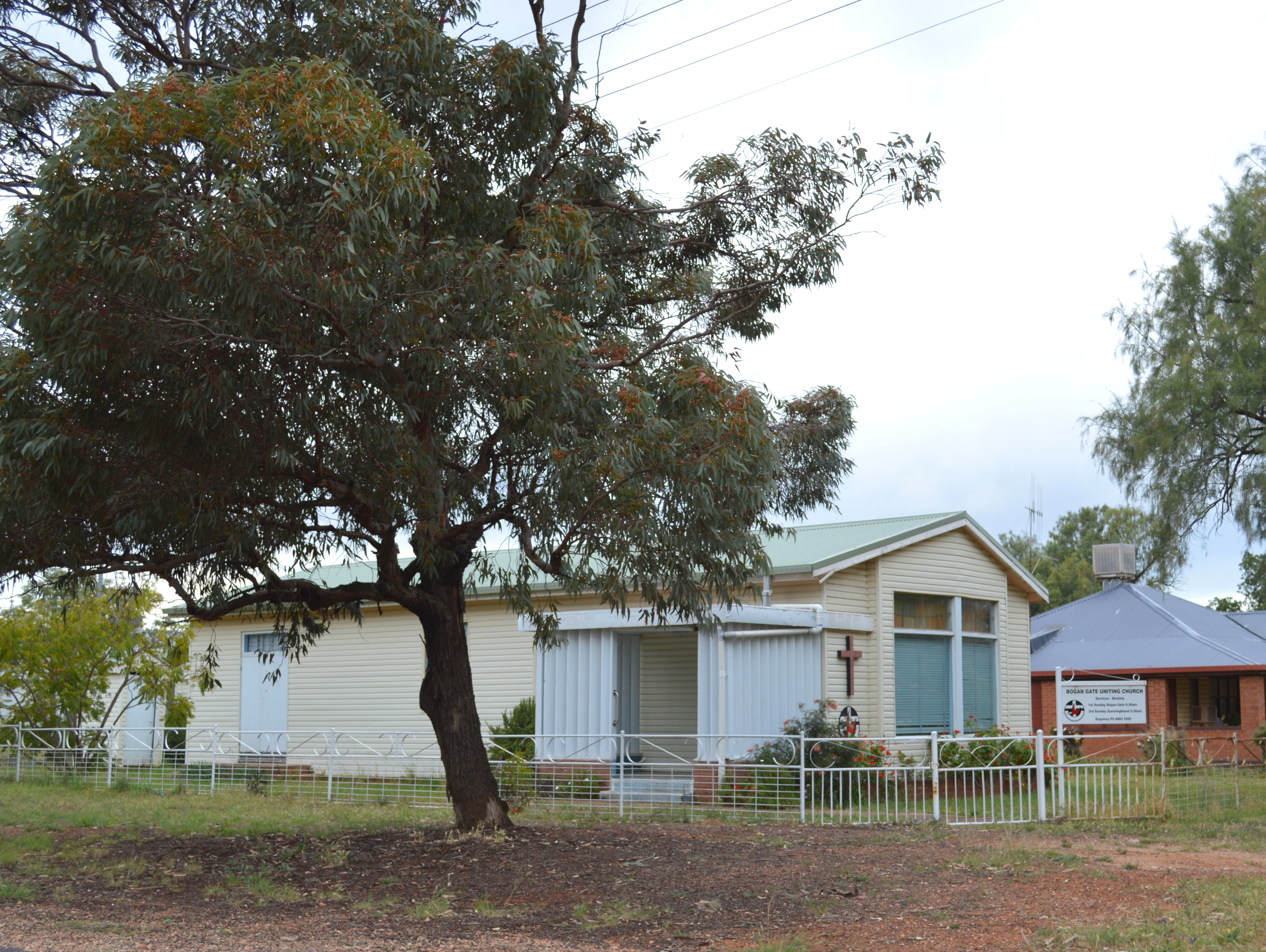
Bogan Gate Uniting Church
