= Bogan Gate–Tottenham railway line =

Railway line in New South Wales, Australia

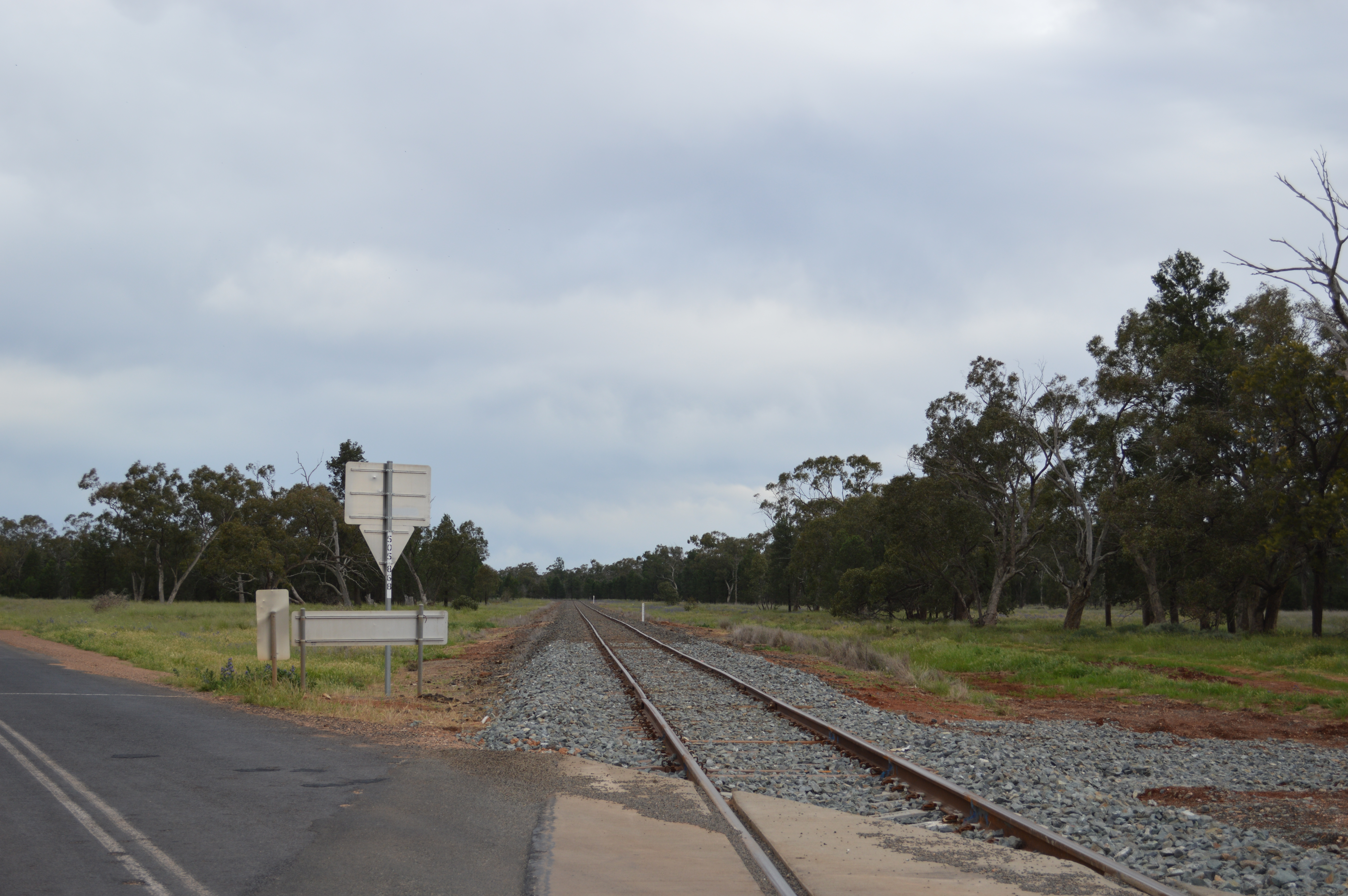
- The Tottenham branch line at Trundle, New South Wales

Technical
- Track gauge: 1,435 mm (4 ft 8 1/2 in)
- Signalling: Train Order Working
- Train protection system: TMACS

The Bogan Gate-to-Tottenham railway line is a railway line in New South Wales, Australia. It starts at the Bogan Gate junction on the transcontinental railway line and terminates at the town of Tottenham, New South Wales, near the geographic centre of that state. Although stations were built on the line, all have been closed, and it is now solely a goods line.

== Stations ==
Station Name	Picture	Opened	Closed	Status
Bogan Gate - Tottenham
Bogan Gate	Bogan Gate	1896		Re-used
Botfield		1907	1974	Closed
Trundle		1907		Closed
The Troffs		1908	1974	Closed
Kadungle		1908	1974	Closed
Gobonderry		1908	1974	Closed
Tullamore		1908		Closed
Yethera		1916	1974	Closed
Middlefield		1916	1974	Closed
Albert		1916		Closed
Minemoorong		1916	1974	Closed
Tottenham		1916		Closed

== See also ==
- Tottenham railway station, Melbourne, Australia
- Tottenham Hale station, London, England
