= Manildra =

- Town
- Coordinates: 33°11′S 148°41′E
- Country: Australia
- State: New South Wales
- LGA: Cabonne Shire Council
- Location: 305 km (190 mi) W of Sydney; 46 km (29 mi) W of Orange; 55 km (34 mi) E of Parkes; 22 km (14 mi) SW of Molong

Government
  - State electorate: Orange
  - Federal division: Calare

Population
  - Total: 529 (UCL 2021)
- Postcode: 2865

Manildra is a small town located halfway between Orange and Parkes in Cabonne Shire, New South Wales, Australia. At the 2021 census, Manildra had a population of 529.

== Industries ==
Located on the banks of Mandagery Creek in the heart of a farming community, it is the home of the Manildra Flour Mill (largest in the Southern Hemisphere) which commenced in 1952 and has since expanded into the largest industrial wheat producer in Australia. The Manildra Flour Mill is owned by the Manildra Group, who export to the world.

MSL Milling, a large canola processing plant, is located in Manildra.

== History ==
The name Manildra is an aboriginal word meaning 'winding river'. It is said the town was called this because of Mandagery Creek, which winds around Manildra's east side.

Manildra's Amusu Theatre (pronounced 'amuse you') is the oldest continually operating cinema in Australia. In 1923 Manildra businessman Allan Tom started a traveling picture show using a carbon arc projector carted on the back of a flatbed truck, screening silent films to crowded halls and tents around central-west New South Wales. He later used a record player, adapted the projector for sound films (talkies) and in 1936 established a permanent theatre building next door to his family's car mechanic garage, which is now a movie poster museum.

== Heritage listings ==
Manildra has a number of heritage-listed sites, including:

- 17 Derowie Street: Amusu Theatre
