= Tullamore, New South Wales =

Tullamore
- Town
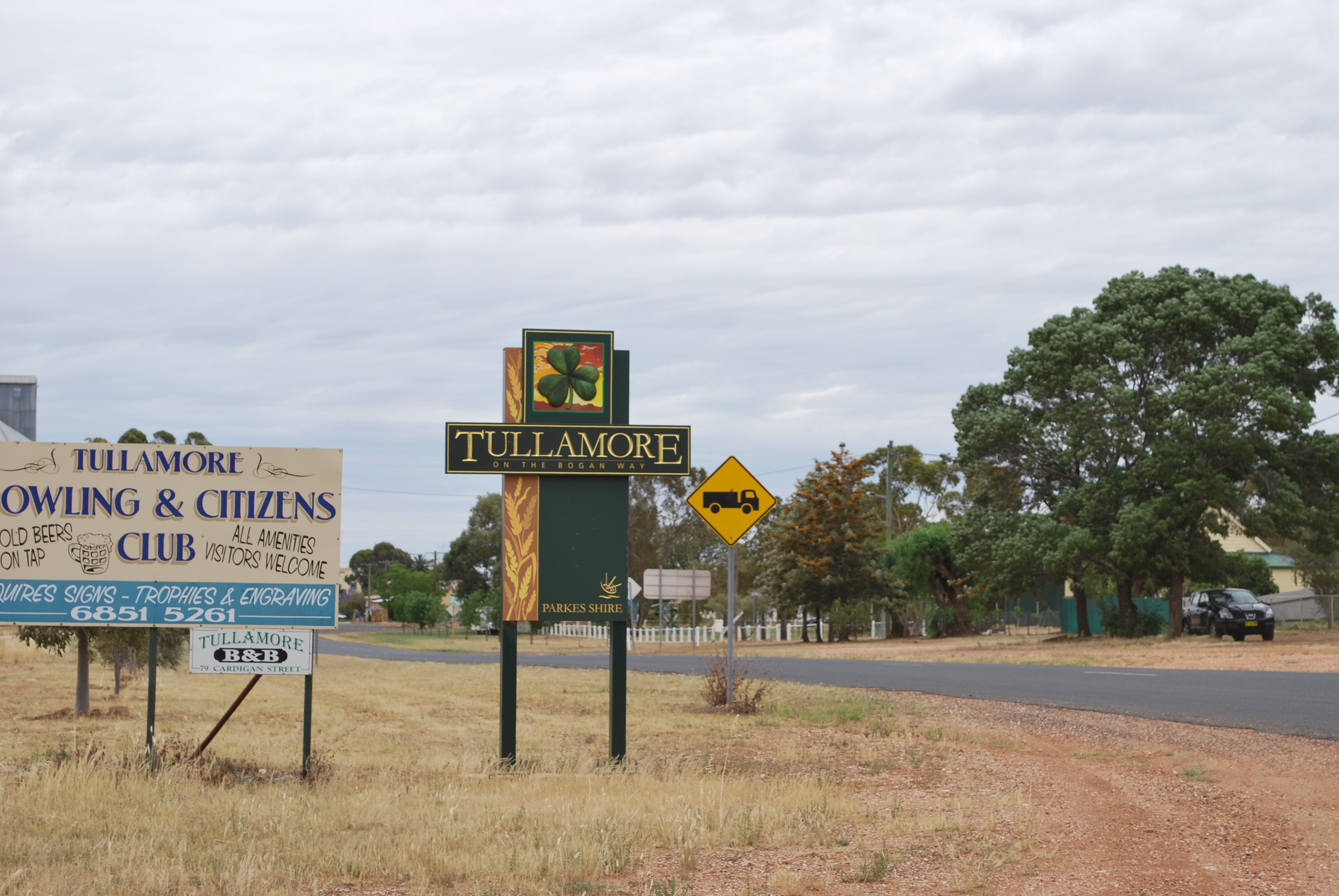
- Entering Tullamore

- Coordinates: 32°38′0″S 147°34′0″E
- Country: Australia
- State: New South Wales
- LGA: Parkes Shire
- Location: 456 km (283 mi) W of Sydney; 130 km (81 mi) WSW of Dubbo; 88 km (55 mi) SW of Narromine; 79 km (49 mi) NE of Condobolin; 69 km (43 mi) W of Peak Hill

Government
  - State electorate: Orange
  - Federal division: Parkes
- Elevation: 239 m (784 ft)

Population
  - Total: 369 (2021 census)
- Postcode: 2874
- Mean max temp: 24.5 °C (76.1 °F)
- Mean min temp: 10.0 °C (50.0 °F)
- Annual rainfall: 497.4 mm (19.58 in)

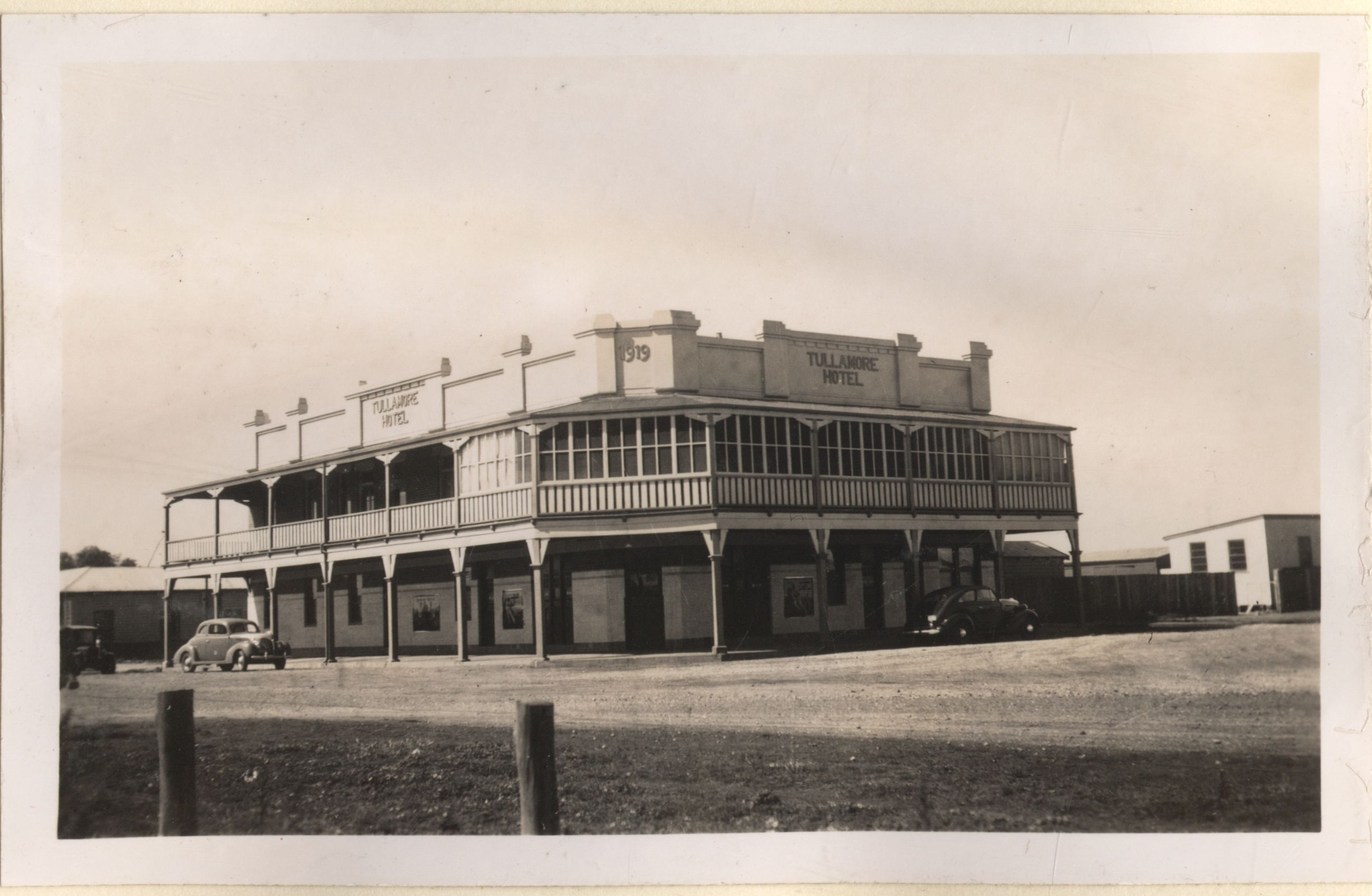

Tullamore is a small town in the North-Western corner of the Parkes Shire in the Central West of New South Wales, Australia. At the 2021 census, Tullamore had a population of 369.

It lies in an expanding broadacre cropping country. Tullamore has a railway station on the Bogan Gate–Tottenham Branch line. It is served by a newly constructed medical centre and a K-12 central school.

Tullamore is the first town mentioned in the original (Australian) version of the song "I've Been Everywhere".

Jimmy Barnes performed at Pola Park in Tullamore, New South Wales on Saturday, 2 November 2019. The concert was part of his "Shutting Down Your Town" tour to promote his album My Criminal Record.

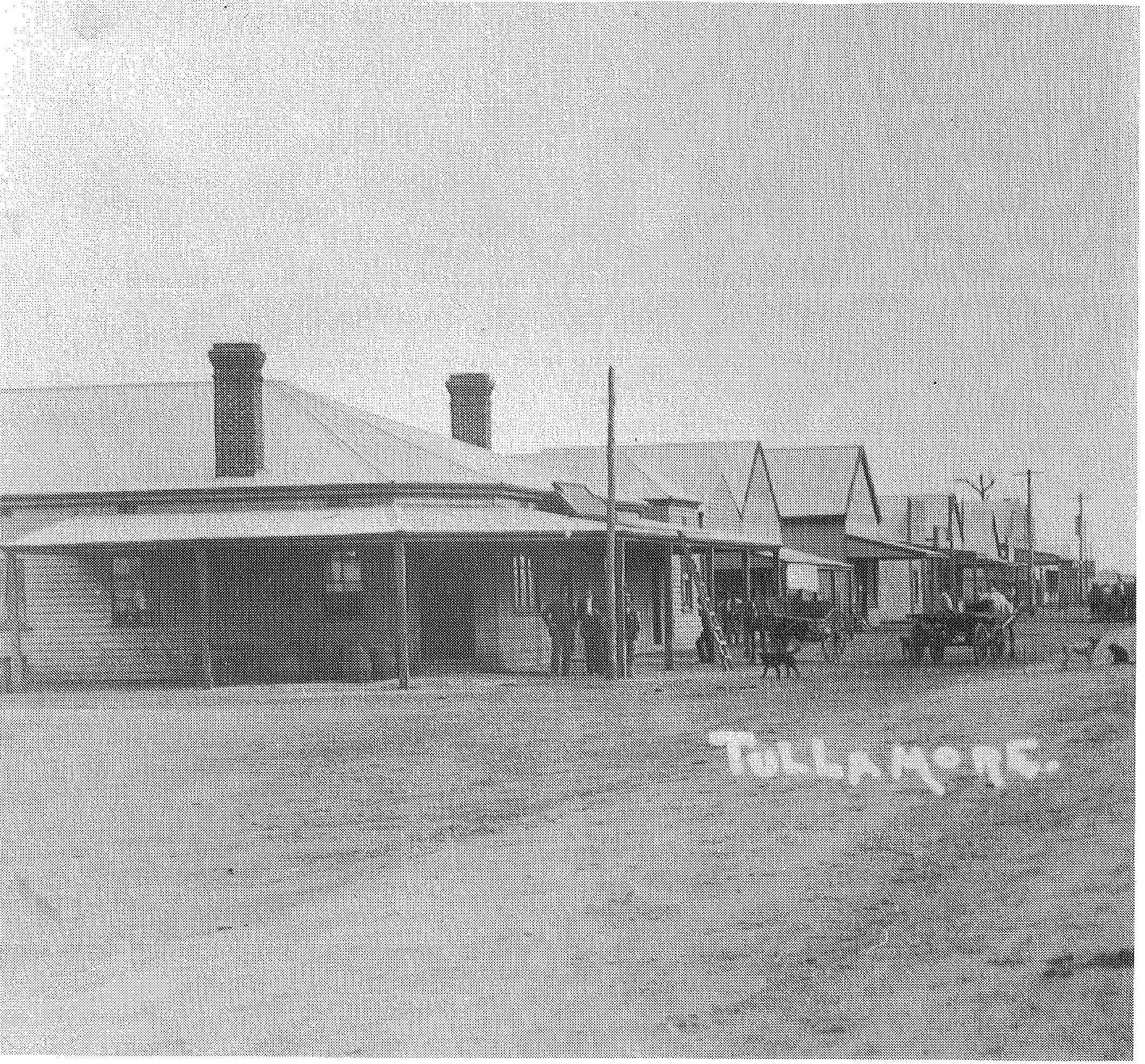

== History ==
The area known as Tullamore was first settled as "Bullock Creek" in 1870. The post office opened under that name on 1 April 1890. It was then renamed Gobondery.

In 1895 Jim Tully, whose family came from Tullamore in Ireland, built a hotel and called it "Tullie's Exchange Hotel". The Kerley family, also from the Tullamore area in Ireland, settled on a nearby property and called it Tullamore Station. It is believed that the town obtained its name from this property. The post office was officially renamed "Tullamore" in 1895.

The original Exchange Hotel was destroyed by fire on 28 December 1919, only a few weeks after its publican James Tully had died.

European exploration of the area began in the early 1800s, with the first recorded European visit by Major Thomas Mitchell in 1835 during his exploration of the Lachlan River. Settlers began to establish pastoral stations in the 1840s, and the region's economy grew through sheep grazing and agriculture.

In the early 20th century, Tullamore's population grew steadily as the region's agricultural sector flourished, particularly through wheat farming and sheep grazing. During World War II, Tullamore played a significant role in the war effort, with local farmers supplying the Australian military with essential food supplies.

== Economy ==
Agriculture remains the dominant industry in Tullamore, with wheat, barley, and canola crops grown in the region, alongside sheep grazing for wool and meat production. The township's economic base has also expanded to include some local retail businesses, including a post office, café, and a general store. Tullamore was home to the Tullamore Grain Cooperative, a major player in the region's grain production and distribution particularly during the first and second world wars. The cooperative was a key driver in the establishment of the Bogan Gate to Tottenham railway, and the various grain silos along its route for grain storage to support wartime effort. Whilst the Tullamore grain silo is currently not in service, it is understood that its owner Graincorp is currently reviewing plans to re-establish the facility with a larger rebuilt silo at the site, in conjunction with a proposed rail line extension through to Narromine to connect to the Brisbane Melbourne freight corridor.

== Culture and landmarks ==
A notable landmark in Tullamore is the Tullamore War Memorial located in the center of the township. This memorial honors local soldiers who served in both World Wars, and it is a focal point for the town's Remembrance Day services.

The Tullamore Hotel is another local icon, dating back to the early 20th century. It remains a popular spot for both locals and passing travelers. The hotel also serves as the social hub of the community, where events, meetings, and celebrations are held throughout the year.

== Climate ==
Being near the geographical centre of New South Wales, the seasonal range is quite marked, with long, hot summers and cool winters, and rather scanty rainfall through the year – mainly resulting from severe thunderstorms and Northwest cloudbands. There are two known occurrences of snowfall in the district, on 5 July 1900 and some time in 1874 (both having occurred on the Melrose Plains to the south-west).

Climate data for Tullamore (Kitchener St, 1970–1988, rainfall 1914–2024); 244 m AMSL; 32.63° S, 147.57° E
| Month | Jan | Feb | Mar | Apr | May | Jun | Jul | Aug | Sep | Oct | Nov | Dec | Year |
|---|---|---|---|---|---|---|---|---|---|---|---|---|---|
| Record high °C (°F) | 45.3 (113.5) | 42.7 (108.9) | 39.0 (102.2) | 36.3 (97.3) | 28.5 (83.3) | 26.3 (79.3) | 24.0 (75.2) | 28.5 (83.3) | 35.7 (96.3) | 37.0 (98.6) | 43.1 (109.6) | 42.0 (107.6) | 45.3 (113.5) |
| Mean daily maximum °C (°F) | 33.1 (91.6) | 32.4 (90.3) | 29.5 (85.1) | 24.7 (76.5) | 19.9 (67.8) | 16.1 (61.0) | 15.3 (59.5) | 17.2 (63.0) | 20.5 (68.9) | 24.6 (76.3) | 28.4 (83.1) | 32.2 (90.0) | 24.5 (76.1) |
| Mean daily minimum °C (°F) | 17.8 (64.0) | 17.9 (64.2) | 14.4 (57.9) | 10.1 (50.2) | 6.6 (43.9) | 3.2 (37.8) | 2.4 (36.3) | 3.4 (38.1) | 5.8 (42.4) | 9.6 (49.3) | 12.6 (54.7) | 15.7 (60.3) | 10.0 (49.9) |
| Record low °C (°F) | 8.1 (46.6) | 7.5 (45.5) | 4.5 (40.1) | −2.0 (28.4) | −3.5 (25.7) | −3.7 (25.3) | −5.6 (21.9) | −3.0 (26.6) | −2.2 (28.0) | 0.8 (33.4) | 1.5 (34.7) | 5.5 (41.9) | −5.6 (21.9) |
| Average precipitation mm (inches) | 52.6 (2.07) | 46.9 (1.85) | 42.6 (1.68) | 37.6 (1.48) | 38.1 (1.50) | 38.4 (1.51) | 35.5 (1.40) | 37.6 (1.48) | 33.0 (1.30) | 43.7 (1.72) | 46.4 (1.83) | 45.1 (1.78) | 497.4 (19.58) |
| Average precipitation days (≥ 0.2 mm) | 5.1 | 4.7 | 4.4 | 4.3 | 5.5 | 6.5 | 6.7 | 6.4 | 5.3 | 6.2 | 5.5 | 5.0 | 65.6 |
Source: Australian Bureau of Meteorology; Tullamore (Kitchener St)

== Tullamore Show Grounds ==
The Tullamore Show Grounds on Cornet Street hosts the annual Tullamore Show each August.
