= Yanco-Wamoon Hawks =

Australian rugby league club

Yanco–Wamoon Hawks
Club information
- Full name: Yanco-Wamoon Hawks Rugby League Football Club
- Colours: Maroon; White

Current details
- Ground: Yanco Sportsground
- Coach: Kye Longford
- Manager: Adam Watterson
- Captain: Ulai Oti-Lahood
- Competition: Group 20 Rugby League

Records
- Premierships: 8 (1973, 1979, 1992, 1993, 1994, 1995, 1996, 2000, 2026)

The Yanco-Wamoon Hawks are a rugby league club based in the town of Yanco, New South Wales, Australia. Founded in 1970, the Hawks compete in the Group 20 Rugby League competition, where they have won eight First Grade premierships, including five in a row from 1992 to 1996.

== History ==
The Yanco–Wamoon Hawks were founded in 1970, when the Wamoon RLFC, known as the "Village", merged with the Yanco club (who were in the Reserve Grade competition) and moved to the Yanco Sportsground after the ground was vacated by its defunct Australian Rules team the Yanco Penguins.

Wamoon had played in the Group 17 Rugby League competition, winning the premiership in 1947, before joining the Group 20 competition as one of its founding clubs in 1954.

After the move to Yanco, the Hawks won the 1973 First Grade premiership with a 16–11 win over Tullibigeal-Euabalong-Lakes United in the Grand Final at the Griffith Exies Oval.

After losing the 1975 final to Griffith, the Hawks won their second title of the decade in 1979 under the coaching of Bill Watson with a 19–14 victory over Griffith Waratahs.

The 1990s proved to be a golden decade for the Hawks, who won five titles in a row from 1992 to 1996, a Riverina Division record. Three of the deciders, from 1993 to 1995, were against the Griffith Waratahs, with the 1992 match being played against the Griffith Black and Whites and the final title of the run against Narrandera. The club then capped off the highly successful period with an eighth premiership in 2000 against Yenda, their last to date.

The Hawks then made one further Grand Final in 2005, losing to West Wyalong, before falling on difficult times. As a result, at the end of the 2011 season, the Hawks amalgamated with the Narrandera Lizards to form the Bidgee Hurricanes. The merged club was quite successful on-field, making the finals in First Grade and even winning an Under 18s premiership, however at the end of the 2014 season, the clubs de-merged, and Yanco-Wamoon returned to being a standalone club, while Narrandera re-formed on their own and joined Group 17 in 2018.

In 2024, the Hawks were forced to withdraw their First Grade team after three rounds due to a player number crisis in the district.

== Premierships ==
=== First Grade ===
- 1973 – Yanco-Wamoon vs. TEL United (at Exies Oval; score: 16–11) coached by Bill Watson.
- 1979 – Yanco-Wamoon vs. Griffith Waratahs (at Leeton; score: 19–14); coached by Bill Watson.
- 1992 – Yanco-Wamoon vs. Griffith (at Leeton; score: 18–17); coached by Wayne Everett.
- 1993 – Yanco-Wamoon vs. Griffith Waratahs (at Narrandera; score: 14–10); coached by Wayne Everett.
- 1994 – Yanco-Wamoon vs. Griffith Waratahs (at Wade Park; score 32–10); coached by John Gutherson.
- 1995 – Yanco-Wamoon vs. Griffith Waratahs (at Griffith Exies; score 28–16); coached by Ken Kerr.
- 1996 – Yanco-Wamoon vs. Narrandera (at Leeton; score 21–20); coached by Wayne Everett.
- 2000 – Yanco-Wamoon vs. Yenda (at score 39–14); coached by Roy Jewitt.

=== Lower Grades ===
Reserve Grade: 1989, 1998

League Tag: 2019

Under 18s: 1989, 1990, 1994, 1995, 1996, 1997, 2001, 2009, 2018

Under 16s: 1987, 1990, 1994, 1996, 1998, 1999

== Players ==
- Kerry Hemsley
- Keith Outten
- Brendon Reeves
- Simon Gillies
- Sean Watson
- Tess Staines

== See also ==
- Group 20 Rugby League
- Griffith Waratah Tigers
- Hay Magpies
- West Wyalong Mallee Men
