= Group 20 Rugby League =

Rugby league competition in Griffith, New South Wales, Australia

- Sport: Rugby league
- Instituted: 1954
- Number of teams: 10 (9 in First Grade)
- Country: Australia
- Premiers: Tullibigeal-Lakes United (2026)
- Most titles: Griffith Waratah Tigers (13 titles)
- Website: Group 20 Rugby League Website

Group 20 is a rugby league competition in the region of Griffith, New South Wales, Australia. The competition is played in six grades, with these being Under 16s, Under 18s, Women's League-Tag, Women's Tackle, Reserve Grade and First Grade.

Currently, a home and away season consisting of eighteen rounds is played. The best five teams then play-off according to the McIntyre system, culminating in the Group 20 Grand Final, which is traditionally held at E.W. Moore Oval in Griffith, currently known as Solar Mad Stadium for sponsorship purposes.

The defending premiers are the Tullibigeal Lakes United Sharks, who won their 4th title in 2026 after finishing the regular season in Third place.

== History ==
Group 20 was established in 1954, as the Wagga Wagga district competition, after many of those clubs left Group 9 and Group 13.

Griffith teams, and others based in the Murrumbidgee Irrigation Area, previously played in both Group 17 and Group 9, prior to various rezonings and redistributions as the code's popularity grew throughout the first half of the 20th century.

The competition initially featured the Griffith, Wagga Kangaroos, Wagga Magpies, Leeton, Narrandera, Yanco, Wamoon, Yenda, Batlow, Tumbarumba, Barellan and Turvey Park clubs.

=== Murrumbidgee Rugby League ===
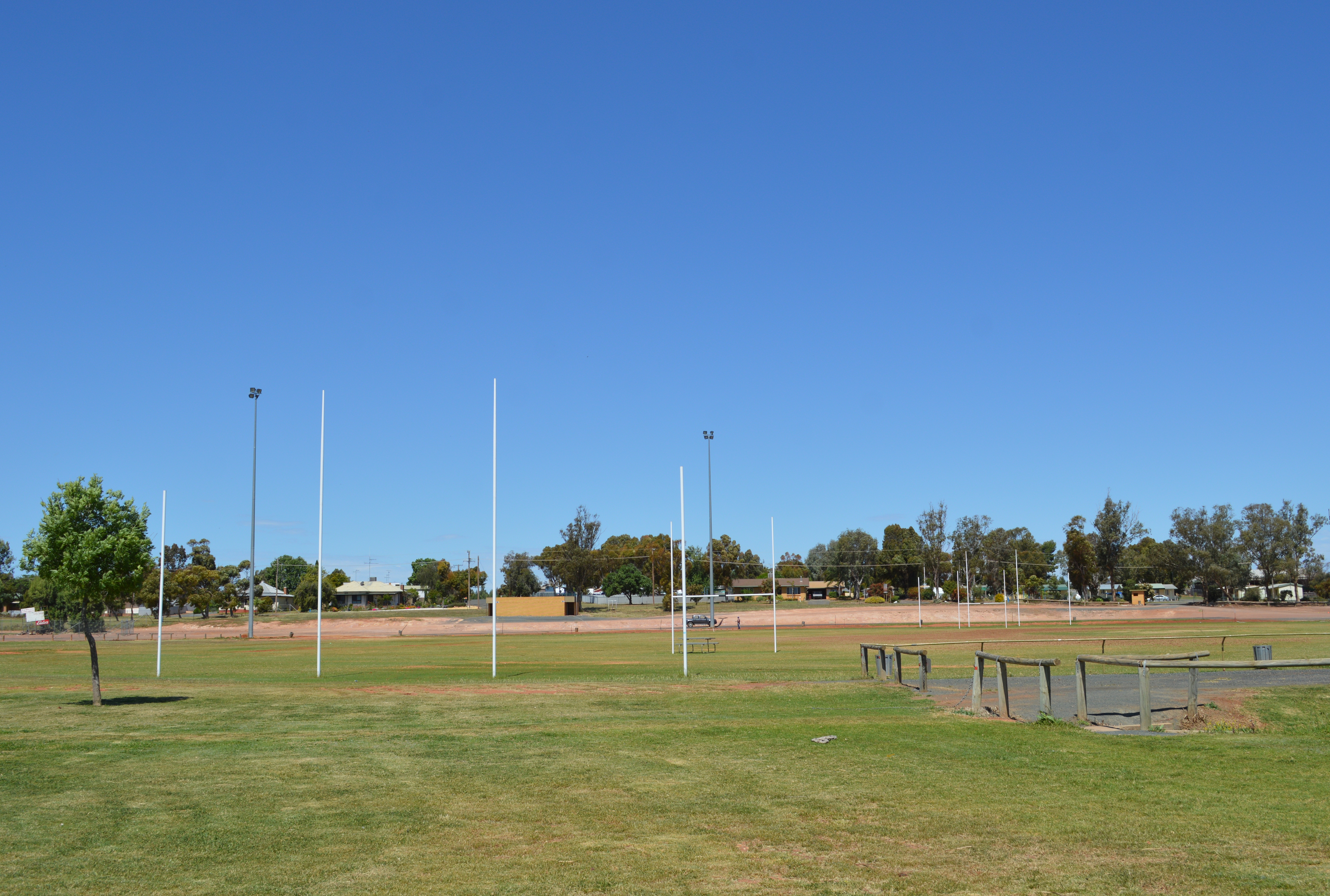
Lake Cargelligo Football Ground

In 1966, four Group 20 clubs (and a number of Group 9 clubs including Gundagai, Junee and Tumut) broke away from their competitions to form the rebel Murrumbidgee Rugby League broke away from the Country Rugby League, leading to four years of reshuffled boundaries from 1967 to 1970. The Murrumbidgee Rugby League was renamed to Riverina Zone 3 in 1969–70.

Given that a large number of the Group 9 clubs (including Cootamundra, Gundagai, Junee, Tumut) joined the five clubs who broke away from Group 20 to form the new competition (Batlow, Tumbarumba, Turvey Park, Wagga Magpies and Wagga Kangaroos), Group 9 was severely weakened. Therefore, the remaining Group 9 clubs were divided up and put into neighbouring competitions.

Barmedman, Temora and West Wyalong joined from Group 9 during this period, leading to the 9/20 name, with all remaining Group 20 clubs from the original split remaining in that competition. Group 20 history recognises the Group 9/20 Premiership as its official history.

The dispute was settled in 1971, with Barmedman and West Wyalong deciding to stay in Group 20, whilst Temora returned to Group 9. Barmedman moved to the Group 9 Second Division after the 1972 season.

=== Recent History ===
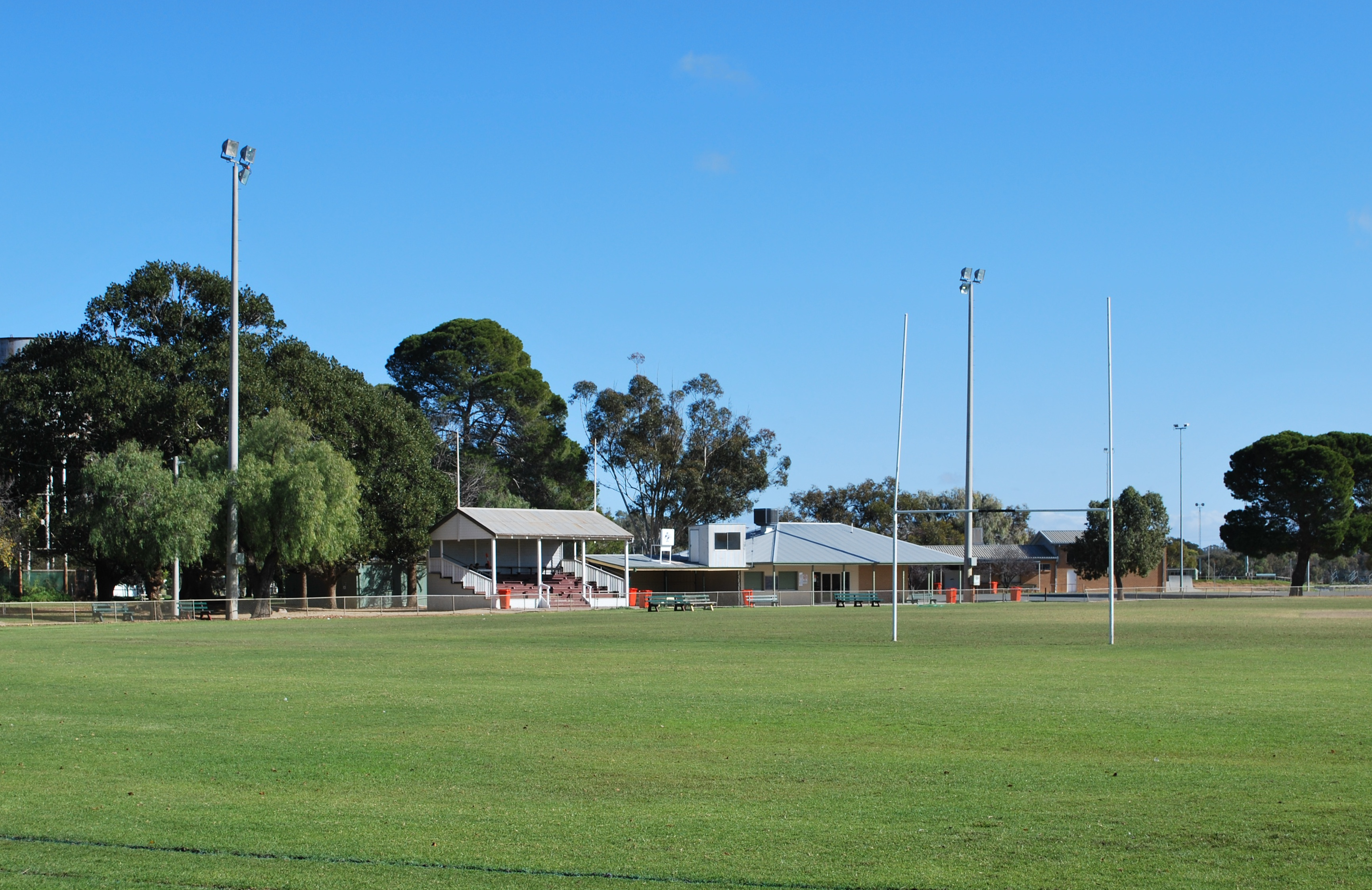
Hay Park Oval No.1

The Darlington Point-Coleambally club won four premierships in the 1980s, with these titles coming in 1980, 1983, 1987 and 1988.

The 1990s were dominated by the Yanco-Wamoon club, who won five consecutive premierships from 1992 to 1996, including three consecutive victories over the Griffith Waratahs club.

After being a founding member of the league and winning three premierships in 1986, 1991, and 1999, the Narrandera Lizards club were in recess in the 2000, 2002 seasons, spent 2001 in Group 17, rejoined Group 20 in 2003 and 2004 and again went into recess from 2005 till 2011. Narrandera and Yanco-Wamoon briefly merged to form the Bidgee Hurricanes from 2012 to 2014, although the merger collapsed in 2015 and Yanco-Wamoon emerged as a standalone club. Narrandera then re-formed again and moved to the Western Riverina Community Cup in 2018.

The Hay Magpies joined from Group 17 in 2006 after that competition collapsed. Yenda became the first Group 20 side to win the prestigious Clayton Cup as the best team in the state in 2009, when they won their sixth premiership of the decade.

Narrandera re-joined the competition from Group 17 in 2026.

== Current clubs ==
As of 2023, there are eight clubs in the First Grade competition, three of which are located in the City of Griffith where the competition is based (the Griffith Waratah Tigers, who withdrew from all senior competitions in 2023, still compete in the junior competitions). The size of the towns competing varies in size, from Griffith and Leeton at 25,000 and 11,000 respectively, to Yenda and Yanco at 1,000 and 450 people respectively.

Club	Nickname	Home Ground	Years in Competition	No. of Premierships	Premiership Years
First Grade Clubs
Darlington Point-Coleambally	Roosters	Darlington Point Sports Ground; Coleambally Sports Ground	1973–present	7	1980, 1983, 1987–88, 2019, 2024–25
Griffith	Black & White Panthers	E.W. Moore Oval, Griffith	1954–present	7	1954, 1958, 1961, 1975, 1990, 1998, 2017
Griffith Waratah	Tigers	Griffith Exies Oval	1964–2022, 2024–present	13	1967, 1969, 1971–72, 1976–78, 1985, 2008, 2010, 2014–15, 2018
Hay	Magpies	Hay Park Oval	2007–present	0	None
Leeton	Galloping Greens	Leeton No. 1 Oval	1954–present	8	1959, 1964, 1966, 1981, 1997, 2007, 2022–23
Narrandera	Lizards	Narrandera Sportsground	1954–2004, 2024–present	3	1986, 1991, 1999
Tullibigeal-Lake Cargelligo	Sharks	Lake Cargelligo Sports Ground; Tullibigeal Recreation Ground	1971–present	4	1974, 2013, 2016, 2026
West Wyalong	Mallee Men	Ron Crowe Oval, West Wyalong	1966–present	7	1968, 1970, 1984, 1989, 2005, 2011–12
Yanco-Wamoon	Hawks	Yanco Sports Ground	1970–2011, 2015–present	8	1973, 1979, 1992–96, 2000
Yenda	Blueheelers	Wade Park, Yenda	1954–present	7	1982, 2001–04, 2006, 2009

=== Map ===
Local Area	in New South Wales
Locations of the current Group 20 clubs.	Relation to state & national capitals

== Previous clubs ==
Club	Nickname	No. of Premierships	Premiership Years	Year Exited	Moved to
Barellan	Rams	0	None	1950s	Moved to Group 17
Barmedman	Clydesdales	0	None	1972	Joined from Group 9 as part of Group 9/20 in 1967, moved to Group 9 Second Division after 1972 season
Batlow	Tigers	0	None	1966	Moved to Murrumbidgee Rugby League in 1966, then Group 13 in 1971
Bidgee (Narrandera-Yanco-Wamoon)	Hurricanes	0	None	2014	Unamalgamated with Narrandera Lizards for Yanco-Wamoon to stand alone in 2015
Temora	Dragons	0	None	1970	Joined as part of Group 9/20 in 1967, returned to Group 9
Tumbarumba	Greens	1	1960	1966	Moved to Murrumbidgee Rugby League in 1966, then Group 13 in 1971
Turvey Park	Lions	0	None	1966	Moved to Murrumbidgee Rugby League, then Group 9
Wagga Wagga	Kangaroos	2	1962–63	1966	Moved to Murrumbidgee Rugby League, then Group 9
Wagga Wagga	Magpies	4	1955–57, 1965	1966	Moved to Murrumbidgee Rugby League, then Group 9

== First Grade Grand Finals ==
Group 20 First Grade Grand Finals
Season	Teams	Premiers	Score	Runners-up	Coach	Barry Hails Medal	Referee	Venue	Report	Minor Premiers
1954	8	Griffith	20–9	Wamoon	Albert Paul		G. Beer	Narrandera		Wamoon
1955	8	Wagga Magpies	11–0	Leeton	Alan Staunton		Mal Brentnall	Leeton Showground		Wagga Magpies
1956	7	Wagga Magpies	5–0	Yenda	Alan Staunton		Jim Stokes	Narrandera		Wagga Magpies
1957	10	Wagga Magpies	18–12	Yenda	Billy Wilson		Len Lamont	Narrandera		Wagga Magpies
1958	10	Griffith	16–8	Leeton	Ian Johnson		Mal Brentnall	Narrandera		Leeton
1959	9	Leeton	16–0	Griffith	Martin Gallagher		Bill Castles	Narrandera		Leeton
1960	9	Tumbarumba	13–8	Yenda	Don Furner		Jack Jewell	Narrandera		
1961	9	Griffith	19–14	Tumbarumba	John Kelly		Len Lamont	Narrandera		
1962		Wagga Kangaroos	14–7	Tumbarumba	Greg Hawick		J. Livermore	Narrandera		
1963		Wagga Kangaroos	7–6	Griffith	Greg Hawick		Tom Blacker	Narrandera		
1964		Leeton	11–2	Wagga Kangaroos	Ron Hopper		Jack Jewell	Narrandera		
1965	10	Wagga Magpies	15–2	Wagga Kangaroos	Arthur Summons		John Gerber	Narrandera		
1966		Leeton	24–2	Yenda	Bill Sense		Barry Maher	Griffith Exies		
Group 9/20 Premiership
1967	9	Griffith Waratahs	32–2	Leeton	Fred Griffiths		Darcy O'Connor	Griffith Exies		
1968	9	West Wyalong	15–4	Griffith Waratahs	Ron Crowe		Graham Barby	Griffith Exies		
1969	10	Griffith Waratahs	18–9	Griffith	Bob Lanigan		Graham Barby	Leeton Showground		
1970	10	West Wyalong	19–18	Temora	Peter Broad		Wayne Marshall	Griffith Exies		
Group 20 Rugby League
1971	9	Griffith Waratahs	13–11	Griffith	Reg McCulla		Angelo Ramponi	Griffith Exies		
1972		Griffith Waratahs	8–2	Griffith	Kevin Le Jeune		Angelo Ramponi	Griffith Exies		Griffith Waratahs
1973		Yanco-Wamoon	16–11	TEL United	Bill Watson		Wayne Marshall	Griffith Exies		
1974		TEL United	11–8	Griffith	Mal Condon		Pat McCarten	Narrandera		TEL United
1975	9	Griffith	22–7	Yanco-Wamoon	Bob Adamson		Darcy Romer	Narrandera		
1976	9	Griffith Waratahs	16–6	Griffith	Bob Priest		Don Graham	Narrandera		Griffith
1977	9	Griffith Waratahs	34–15	Griffith	Bob Priest		Don Graham	Griffith Exies		Griffith Waratahs
1978	9	Griffith Waratahs	29–10	Leeton	Bob Priest		Don Graham	Griffith Exies		Griffith Waratahs
1979	9	Yanco-Wamoon	19–14	Griffith Waratahs	Bill Watson		Don Graham	Leeton		Griffith Waratahs
1980		Darlington Point-Coleambally	16–15	Yanco-Wamoon	Geoff Foster		Don Graham	Leeton		
1981		Leeton	30–11	Yenda	Ron Pilon		Don Graham	Leeton		Leeton
1982		Yenda	23–22	West Wyalong	Mike Fish		Don Graham	Leeton		Yenda
1983	9	Darlington Point-Coleambally	25–2	Yenda	Geoff Foster		Don Graham	Yenda		Darlington Point-Coleambally
1984	9	West Wyalong	14–2	Darlington Point-Coleambally	Ron Pilon		Lance Harrigan	Yenda		Darlington Point-Coleambally
1985	8	Griffith Waratahs	20–12	Darlington Point-Coleambally	Warren Jowett		Ian Moore	Narrandera		Darlington Point-Coleambally
1986	9	Narrandera	21–6	West Wyalong	Steve Condren		Ian Moore	Griffith Exies		Narrandera
1987	9	Darlington Point-Coleambally	18–6	Lakes United	John Barnhill		Ian Moore	Yenda		West Wyalong
1988	9	Darlington Point-Coleambally	14–8	West Wyalong	John Clune		Ian Moore	Leeton		Yanco-Wamoon
1989	9	West Wyalong	24–2	Lakes United	Mick Lewis		Pat McCarten	Narrandera		West Wyalong
1990	9	Griffith	22–16	West Wyalong	Ray Schaeffer		Ian Moore	Yenda		Griffith
1991	9	Narrandera	25–23	Griffith	Bill Watson		Pat McCarten	Griffith Exies		Griffith
1992	9	Yanco-Wamoon	18–17	Griffith	Wayne Everett		Pat McCarten	Leeton		Yanco-Wamoon
1993	9	Yanco-Wamoon	14–10	Griffith Waratahs	Wayne Everett		Pat McCarten	Narrandera		Griffith Waratahs
1994	9	Yanco-Wamoon	32–10	Griffith Waratahs	John Gutherson		Col Patterson	Yenda		Yanco-Wamoon
1995	9	Yanco-Wamoon	28–16	Griffith Waratahs	Ken Kerr		Col Patterson	Griffith Exies		Yanco-Wamoon
1996	9	Yanco-Wamoon	21–20	Narrandera	Wayne Everett		Col Patterson	Leeton		Griffith Waratahs
1997	9	Leeton	25–18	Griffith Waratahs	Daryl Rando		Col Patterson	Narrandera		Leeton
1998	9	Griffith	16–12	Yanco-Wamoon	Chris Brennan		Col Patterson	Yenda		Griffith
1999	9	Narrandera	20–18	Griffith Waratahs	Willie Wolfgramm		Col Patterson	Griffith		Narrandera
2000	8	Yanco-Wamoon	39–14	Yenda	Roy Jewitt		Col Patterson	Yanco		Yenda
2001	8	Yenda	28–16	Leeton	Trevor Richards	Ray Mavroudis	Col Patterson	West Wyalong		Yenda
2002	8	Yenda	38–18	Leeton	Ray Mavroudis	Scott Pennell	Col Patterson	Griffith		Yenda
2003	9	Yenda	33–30	West Wyalong	Ray Mavroudis	Trevor Richards	Col Patterson	Griffith		West Wyalong
2004	9	Yenda	18–16	Leeton	Ray Mavroudis	Sonny Topuola	Col Patterson	Griffith		Yenda
2005	8	West Wyalong	34–14	Yanco-Wamoon	Ryan Prevett	Ryan Prevett	Col Patterson	Griffith		West Wyalong
2006	8	Yenda	26–22	Leeton	Paul Lawrence	Steve Richards	Willie DeValentin	Griffith		Yenda
2007	8	Leeton	52–34	Yenda	Jody Rudd	Linton Price	Willie DeValentin	Griffith		Leeton
2008	8	Griffith Waratahs	40–36	Yenda	Mark Palmer	Andrew Fifita	Willie DeValentin	Griffith		Leeton
2009	8	Yenda	24–20	Griffith Waratahs	Andrew Lavaka	Trevor Richards	Kerry Davy	Griffith		Yenda
2010	8	Griffith Waratahs	30–16	Yenda	Kodie Charles	Ben Jeffery	Kerry Davy	Griffith		Griffith Waratahs
2011	9	West Wyalong	24–12	Leeton	M. Loudon & W. Jones	Craig Iverach	Willie DeValentin	Griffith		West Wyalong
2012	9	West Wyalong	38–10	Tullibigeal-Lake Cargelligo	W. Jones & M. Loudon	Mark Wood	Willie DeValentin	Griffith		West Wyalong
2013	9	Tullibigeal-Lake Cargelligo	26–10	Leeton	Brent Pike	Jaden Kelly	Mark Stenhouse	Griffith		Leeton
2014	9	Griffith Waratahs	22–18	West Wyalong	Kose Lelei	David Rauluni	Mark Stenhouse	Griffith		West Wyalong
2015	9	Griffith Waratahs	50–22	Darlington Point-Coleambally	Kose Lelei	Luke Farmer	Mark Stenhouse	Griffith		West Wyalong
2016	9	Tullibigeal-Lake Cargelligo	14–8	West Wyalong	Tim Ring	Tim McAuley	Brendon Steele	Griffith		Tullibigeal-Lake Cargelligo
2017	9	Griffith	28–10	Griffith Waratahs	Craig Morriss	Kodie Charles	Max Biles	Griffith		Griffith
2018	9	Griffith Waratahs	30–20	Yenda	Kose Lelei	Kose Lelei	Tom Downey	Griffith		Yenda
2019	9	Darlington Point-Coleambally	30–18	Griffith Waratahs	R. McGoldrick & B. Jeffery	Ben Jeffery	Rod Crowe	Griffith		Griffith Waratahs
2020	2020–2021 Seasons cancelled/incomplete due to COVID-19 pandemic									
2021	2020–2021 Seasons cancelled/incomplete due to COVID-19 pandemic									Griffith
2022	9	Leeton	30–10	Darlington Point-Coleambally	Hayden Philp	Brayden Scarr	Rod Crowe	Griffith		Darlington Point-Coleambally
2023	8	Leeton	28–24	Darlington Point-Coleambally	Hayden Philp	Beniel Dakunibubului	David Milne	Griffith		Darlington Point-Coleambally
2024	8	Darlington Point-Coleambally	46–12	Griffith	Adam McCann, Ben Jeffery & Guy Thompson	Luke Hogan	David Milne	Griffith		Darlington Point-Coleambally
2025	9	Darlington Point-Coleambally	30–22	Hay	Adam McCann, Ben Jeffery & Guy Thompson	Ben Jeffery	Connor Lynch	Griffith		Darlington Point-Coleambally
2026	9	Tullibigeal-Lake Cargelligo	17–16	Griffith Waratahs	Craig Morriss & Cody Collins	Bobby Jones	Connor Lynch	Griffith		Griffith Waratahs

== Women's Tackle Grand Finals ==
Season	Teams	Premiers	Score	Runners-up	Report	Minor Premiers	Best on Ground
2024	5	Hay	18–16	Tullibigeal-Lake Cargelligo		Tullibigeal-Lake Cargelligo	Wendy Gonevulavula
2025	4	Hay	24–10	Griffith Waratahs		Griffith Waratahs	Wendy Gonevulavula
2026	5	Hay	18–16	Yenda		Yenda	Hannah Stewart

== Ladies League Tag Grand Finals ==
Group 20 Ladies League Tag Grand Finals
Season	Teams	Premiers	Score	Runners-up	Coach	Report	Minor Premiers	Best on Ground
2007		Griffith	–	Leeton				
2008	9	Leeton	4–2	Griffith	Tim Del Guzzo		Leeton	
2009	9	Leeton	3–0	Griffith	Louise Strachan & Isaac Houghton		Leeton	
2010	9	Leeton	6–3	Hay	Erin Bonetti		Leeton	
2011	8	Leeton	10–6	Hay	? & Jackson Goman		Leeton	Rebecca Hill
2012	9	Leeton	16–6	West Wyalong	Warren Weir			Kate McDonell
2013		West Wyalong		Griffith				Jordan Oakes
2014	9	Leeton	8–0	West Wyalong	David Warburton		Griffith	Ua Ravu
2015	9	Hay	12–4	Leeton	Rachael Pearson & Neil-John Nisbet		Leeton	Rachael Pearson
2016		Hay	10–0	Leeton	? & Neil John Nisbet			Luci Lugsdin
2017	9	Yenda	14–12	Griffith	Sam Loaloadravu		Yenda	Ameila Lolotonga
2018	9	Griffith	36–18	Hay	Shailyn Williams		Yenda	Mata Varasia
2019	9	Yanco-Wamoon	12–4	Leeton	Monique Higgins		Yanco-Wamoon	Tess Staines
2020	2020–2021 Seasons cancelled/incomplete due to COVID-19 pandemic							
2021	2020–2021 Seasons cancelled/incomplete due to COVID-19 pandemic						Leeton	
2022	9	Leeton	18–8	Griffith	Daniel Watt		Griffith	Jess McDonell
2023	9	Leeton	18–12	West Wyalong	Jade Butler		West Wyalong	Ava Lemon
2024	9	Yenda	14–10	West Wyalong	Chris Matthews		Yenda	Jayda Cook & Havana Cook
2025	9	Leeton	10–4	West Wyalong	Shane Leighton & Sophie McGregor		Leeton	Zarly Pike
2026	9	Griffith	24–16	Leeton	Shailyn Williams		Leeton	Tahlia Holborow

== Reserve Grade Grand Finals ==
Reserve Grade Toby Blunt Cup
Season	Teams	Premiers	Score	Runners-up	Report	Minor Premiers	Best on Ground
1954	8	Barellan	7–2	Griffith			
1955	8	Griffith	9—2	Wamoon			
1956	7	Yanco	11–0	Wagga Magpies			
1957	10	Barellan	11–3	Yanco			
1958	10	Leeton	14–11	Wagga Kangaroos			
1959	9	Wagga Kangaroos	10–6	Leeton			
1960	9	Griffith	9–0	Wagga Magpies			
1961	9	Wamoon	26–10	Griffith			
1962		Leeton	18–8	Tumbarumba			
1963		Griffith	22–11	Wagga Magpies			
1964		Griffith	5–2	Wagga Magpies			
1965	10	Griffith	6–4	Wagga Magpies			
1966		Griffith Waratahs	7–4	Leeton			
Group 9/20 Premiership							
1967	9	West Wyalong	16–11	Griffith			
1968	9	Leeton	10–6	West Wyalong			
1969	10	Griffith	28–2	Barmedman			
1970	10	Griffith	23–4	Temora			
Group 20 Rugby League							
1971	9	Griffith	31–5	Leeton			
1972		Lakes United	11–10	Griffith			
1973		Griffith	10–2	Lakes United			
1974		Griffith	27–0	Lakes United			
1975	9	Griffith	8–5	Lakes United			
1976	9	Griffith	13–2	Griffith Waratahs			
1977	9	Griffith Waratahs	36–10	West Wyalong			
1978	9	Griffith Waratahs	12–10	Griffith			
1979	9	Griffith Waratahs	25–8	Griffith			
1980		Leeton	17–7	Griffith			
1981		Leeton	19–6	Griffith			
1982		Griffith Waratahs	18–9	West Wyalong			
1983	9	West Wyalong	18–17	Griffith			
1984	9	West Wyalong	24–4	Darlington Point-Coleambally			
1985	8	West Wyalong	46–10	Griffith Waratahs			
1986	9	West Wyalong	22–16	Griffith Waratahs			
1987	9	West Wyalong	16–0	Griffith Waratahs			
1988	9	Lakes United	17–4	Yanco-Wamoon			
1989	9	Yanco-Wamoon	18–7	West Wyalong			
1990	9	Leeton	22–18	Griffith			
1991	9	Griffith Waratahs	25–10	West Wyalong			
1992	9	Griffith	14–13	Griffith Waratahs			
1993	9	Griffith Waratahs	42–18	Griffith			
1994	9	Griffith Waratahs	19–14	Griffith			
1995	9	Griffith Waratahs	24–8	Yenda			
1996	9	Griffith Waratahs	24–12	Yenda			
1997	9	Leeton	60–2	Griffith			
1998	9	Yanco-Wamoon	16–12	Leeton			
1999	9	Griffith Waratahs	38–24	Yanco-Wamoon			
2000	8	Yenda	28–10	Leeton			
2001	8	Leeton	36–10	Griffith			
2002	8	Griffith	24–16	Leeton			
2003	9	West Wyalong	20–16	Darlington Point-Coleambally			
2004	9	Yenda	44–16	Griffith Waratahs			
2005	8	Leeton	18–4	Yanco-Wamoon			
2006	8	Leeton	22–14	Griffith Waratahs			
2007	8	Yenda	38–12	Griffith Waratahs			
2008	8	Darlington Point-Coleambally	28–22	Yenda			
2009	8	Hay	28–26	Griffith			
2010	8	Griffith Waratahs	26–24	Yenda			
2011	9	Yenda	28–22	West Wyalong			Blake Alpen
2012	9	West Wyalong	18–6	Leeton			Craig Johnston
2013	9	West Wyalong	38–34	Tullibigeal-Lake Cargelligo			Sam Parkes
2014	9	West Wyalong	22–4	Griffith			Cameron Miller
2015	9	West Wyalong	28–24	Griffith			Justin Kerry
2016	9	Griffith Waratahs	12–10	Darlington Point-Coleambally			Ben Vitucci
2017	9	Leeton	18–6	Yanco-Wamoon			Dylan Fraser
2018	9	Griffith Waratahs	24–14	Yenda			Semisi Rogoyawa
2019	9	Darlington Point-Coleambally	18–10	Leeton			Trey Eldridge
2020	2020–2021 Seasons cancelled/incomplete due to COVID-19 pandemic						
2021	2020–2021 Seasons cancelled/incomplete due to COVID-19 pandemic					Yenda	
2022	7	Yenda	40–8	Darlington Point-Coleambally		Yenda	Trey Woodland
2023	6	Yenda	26–4	Leeton		Yenda	Noah Forbutt
2024	9	Griffith Waratahs	30–10	Yenda		Yenda	Luke Farmer
2025	9	Griffith Waratahs	28–22	Hay		Hay	Junior Lilomaiava
2026	10	Yenda	14–13	Narrandera		Narrandera	Salesi Fatafehi

== Under 18's Grand Finals ==
Under 18 Harold Eckley Cup
Season	Teams	Premiers	Score	Runners-up	Report	Minor Premiers	Len Bertoldo Medal
1954		Wagga Magpies	11–6	Griffith			
1955		Griffith	6–0	Narrandera			
1956		Griffith	6–3	Leeton			
1957		Griffith	19–8	Wagga Magpies			
1958		Griffith	14–0	Wamoon			
1959		Griffith	9–5	Wagga Magpies			
1960		Griffith	21–0	Leeton			
1961		Leeton	12–5	Wagga Kangaroos			
1962		Wagga Magpies	17–11	Wagga Kangaroos			
1963		Wagga Kangaroos	13–3	Yenda			
1964		Wagga Kangaroos	2–0	Yenda			
1965		Wagga Kangaroos	13–3	Leeton			
1966		Griffith	19–8	Leeton			
Group 9/20 Premiership							
1967		Griffith Waratahs	25–2	Temora			
1968		Griffith	16–15	Temora			
1969		Griffith Waratahs	14–6	West Wyalong			
1970		Griffith Waratahs	15–0	Griffith			
Group 20 Rugby League							
1971		Griffith	17–9	Griffith Waratahs			
1972		Griffith	21–0	Griffith Waratahs			
1973		Griffith Waratahs	10–7	Griffith			
1974		Leeton	15–8	Griffith Waratahs			
1975		Griffith Waratahs	16–5	Griffith			
1976		Griffith	25–0	Griffith Waratahs			
1977		Griffith	21–21	Leeton			
(replay)		Griffith	10–5	Leeton			
1978		Griffith Waratahs	15–7	Griffith			
1979		Griffith Waratahs	10–0	Leeton			
1980		Leeton	16–7	West Wyalong			
1981		West Wyalong	19–5	Darlington Point-Coleambally			
1982		Leeton	?	Griffith			
1983		Leeton	34–10	Darlington Point-Coleambally			
1984		Lakes United	10–10	West Wyalong			
(replay)		Lakes United	22–8	West Wyalong			
1985		Narrandera	22–10	Griffith			
1986		Lakes United	16–14	Griffith Waratahs			
1987		Darlington Point-Coleambally	12–4	Leeton			
1988		Leeton	32–22	Lakes United			
1989		Yanco-Wamoon	20–12	Griffith Waratahs			
1990		Yanco-Wamoon	20–18	Leeton			
1991		Leeton	22–10	Yanco-Wamoon			
1992		Leeton	22–20	Yanco-Wamoon			
1993		Lakes United	16–10	Leeton			
1994		Yanco-Wamoon	42–12	Lakes United			
1995		Yanco-Wamoon	38–8	Griffith			
1996		Yanco-Wamoon	28–14	Leeton			
1997		Yanco-Wamoon	30–14	Griffith			
1998		Griffith Waratahs	30–19	Lakes United			
1999		West Wyalong	26–12	Griffith Waratahs			
2000		West Wyalong	14–6	Leeton			
2001		Yanco-Wamoon	30–14	Leeton			
2002		Griffith Waratahs	44–22	Lakes United			
2003		Leeton	26–25	West Wyalong			
2004		Griffith	40–22	Griffith Waratahs			
2005		Griffith Waratahs	42–28	Darlington Point-Coleambally			
2006		Griffith Waratahs	58–4	Leeton			
2007		Griffith Waratahs	28–22	Leeton			
2008		West Wyalong	40–34	Griffith Waratahs			
2009		Yanco-Wamoon	50–12	Griffith Waratahs			
2010		Hay	22–18	Griffith Waratahs			
2011		Leeton	28–22	Tullibigeal-Lake Cargelligo			Scott Gill
2012		Tullibigeal-Lake Cargelligo	24–22	Bidgee Hurricanes			Dylan Phillips
2013		Bidgee Hurricanes	28–20	Tullibigeal-Lake Cargelligo			Jesse McDonald
2014		Griffith Waratahs	34–24	Leeton			James Pewlowski
2015		Leeton	24–14	Yanco-Wamoon			Josh Fisher
2016		Yenda	8–6	Darlington Point-Coleambally			Jermayne Cook
2017		Griffith	28–22	Yanco-Wamoon			Ziggie Vincent
2018		Yanco-Wamoon	24–22	Leeton			Will Barnes
2019		Yenda	24–20	Darlington Point-Coleambally			Isaiah Buerckner-Little
2020	2020–2021 Seasons cancelled/incomplete due to COVID-19 pandemic						
2021	2020–2021 Seasons cancelled/incomplete due to COVID-19 pandemic					Yenda	
2022	5	Leeton	20–18	Griffith		Griffith	Beniel Dakunibubului
2023	3	Griffith	38–14	Leeton		Leeton	Tali Talioesila
2024	5	Leeton	24–18	Griffith		Leeton	Brayden Fejsa-Sexton
2025	6	Leeton	20–16	Griffith		Leeton	Caydan Hillier
2026	5	West Wyalong	10–8	Yanco-Wamoon		West Wyalong	Will Tulloch

== Under 16's Grand Finals ==
Under 16 Aub Farrell Trophy
Season	Teams	Premiers	Score	Runners-up	Report	Minor Premiers	Joe Fabris Medal
Group 9/20 Premiership							
1968		Griffith Waratahs	30–9	West Wyalong			
1969		Griffith Waratahs	24–19	Griffith			
1970		Griffith	5–3	Griffith Waratahs			
Group 20 Rugby League							
1971		West Wyalong	12–0	Griffith Waratahs			
1972		Griffith Waratahs	15–10	Leeton			
1973		Griffith Waratahs	22–5	West Wyalong			
1974		West Wyalong	19–5	Griffith			
1975		Griffith	10–6	Griffith Waratahs			
1976		Griffith	8–3	Darlington Point-Coleambally			
1977		Griffith Waratahs	31–7	Darlington Point-Coleambally			
1978		Leeton	21–9	Darlington Point-Coleambally			
1979		Narrandera	24–8	Darlington Point-Coleambally			
1980		Griffith	18–5	Leeton			
1981		Darlington Point-Coleambally	10–5	Leeton			
1982		West Wyalong	20–8	Darlington Point-Coleambally			
1983		Griffith	12–10	Lakes United			
1984		Griffith Waratahs	16–10	Lakes United			
1985		Leeton	14–10	Yanco-Wamoon			
1986		Narrandera	12–9	Leeton			
1987		Yanco-Wamoon	10–0	Griffith Waratahs			
1988		Griffith Waratahs	16–6	Yanco-Wamoon			
1989		Leeton	41–4	Yanco-Wamoon			
1990		Yanco-Wamoon	21–8	Narrandera			
1991		Leeton	18–8	Narrandera			
1992		Lakes United	18–12	Narrandera			
1993		West Wyalong	14–10	Darlington Point-Coleambally			
1994		Yanco-Wamoon	18–12	Leeton			
1995		Yenda	24–18	Yanco-Wamoon			
1996		Yanco-Wamoon	26–8	Leeton			
1997		Leeton	12–10	Yanco-Wamoon			
1998		Yanco-Wamoon	20–10	Leeton			
1999		Yanco-Wamoon	20–16	Leeton			
2000		Griffith Waratahs	34–16	Lakes United			
2001		Leeton	26–10	Griffith			
2002		Griffith Waratahs	18–16	Griffith			
2003		Griffith Waratahs	44–0	Griffith			
2004		Griffith Waratahs	46–34	Yanco-Wamoon			
2005		Yenda	34–12	Griffith Waratahs			
2006		Leeton	49–18	Griffith Waratahs			
2007		Griffith Waratahs	27–20	West Wyalong			Jake Forrester
2008		Griffith Waratahs	26–16	Leeton			Moahoni Lelei
2009		Griffith Waratahs	40–36 AET	Tullibigeal-Lake Cargelligo			Lorenco Tafili
2010		Tullibigeal-Lake Cargelligo	26–24	Griffith Waratahs			Jayden Clark
2011		Darlington Point-Coleambally	28–16	Tullibigeal-Lake Cargelligo			Ben Hogan
2012		Tullibigeal-Lake Cargelligo	18–14	Darlington Point-Coleambally			Josh Cahill
2013		Darlington Point-Coleambally	30–28	Leeton			Lukas Brain
2014		Darlington Point-Coleambally	32–12	Yenda			Josh Boag
2015		Yenda	22–12	Leeton			Ali Ngahe
2016		Leeton	14–10	Yanco-Wamoon			Elwyn Ravu
2017		Leeton	36–8	Yanco-Wamoon			Fletcher Blackett
2018		Yenda	30–20	Yanco-Wamoon			Jyden Smith
2019		Yenda	34–10	West Wyalong			Travis Hams
2020	2020–2021 Seasons cancelled/incomplete due to COVID-19 pandemic						
2021	2020–2021 Seasons cancelled/incomplete due to COVID-19 pandemic					Griffith	
2022	5	Leeton	30–6	Yenda		Griffith	Kyson Freer
2023	4	Griffith	20–16	Leeton		Griffith	Jezaiah Charles
2024	6	Griffith	38–10	Tullibigeal-Lake Cargelligo		Griffith	Matthew Adams
Competition control transferred from Senior to Junior League							
2025	7	Leeton	38–24	Tullibigeal-Lake Cargelligo		Leeton	Nate DePaoli
2026	7	Leeton	23–16	Griffith		Leeton	Max Wright

== Recent Seasons ==
=== 2026 ===
==== Finals Series ====
Qualifying final
2	Yanco-Wamoon	31
3	Tullibigeal-Lakes United	16
4	Leeton	66
5	Griffith Black & Whites	6

Major semi-final
1	Griffith Waratahs	40
Yanco-Wamoon	18
Minor semi-final
Tullibigeal-Lakes United	12
Leeton	8

Preliminary final
Yanco-Wamoon	6
Tullibigeal-Lakes United	30

Grand final
Griffith Waratahs	16
Tullibigeal-Lakes United	17

== Group 20 Awards ==
=== Ray Thorpe Medal ===
Year	Player of the Year	
Year	Player	Club
1956	Keith Jack	Leeton
1957	R. Bowden	Batlow
1958	Bill Myers	Wamoon
1959	Alan Buckley	Batlow
1960	Rob Campbell	Leeton
1961		
1962		
1963	Reg Cooper	Griffith
1964	Rob Campbell	Leeton
1965	Bill Lockett	Yenda
1966	Rob Campbell	Leeton
1967	Rob Campbell	Leeton
1968	Greg Hay	Griffith
1969		
1970	Kevin Hodgson	Darlington Point
1971	Ron Crowe	Barmedman
1972		
1973	Harry Sanson	TEL United
1974	Bob Adamson	Narrandera
1975	Andy Kelly	Narrandera
1976	Peter Broad	West Wyalong
1977	Terry Regan	Griffith
1978	Keith Outten Mick Curren	Yanco-Wamoon Leeton
1979	Andy Kelly	Narrandera
1980	Michael Bourke	West Wyalong
1981	Geoff Foster Paul Colenso	Darlington Point-Coleambally Leeton
1982	Ron Pilon	West Wyalong
1983	Paul Colenso	Leeton
1984	Bob Sheridan Billy Arnold Chris Tindale	Yanco-Wamoon Leeton Narrandera
1985	David Ivanoff	Narrandera
1986	Col Cavanagh	Yenda
1987	Ray Thorpe	Tullibigeal-Lake Cargelligo
1988	Col Cavanagh	Yenda
1989	Glen Dawson	Griffith
1990	Ray Thorpe	Tullibigeal-Lake Cargelligo
1991	Wayne Everett Glen Dawson	Yanco-Wamoon Griffith
1992	Chris Marland	Tullibigeal-Lake Cargelligo
1993	Chris Marland	Tullibigeal-Lake Cargelligo
1994	Darren Tuckett Tony Moers	Yanco-Wamoon Griffith Waratahs
1995	Ray Thorpe David Blomfield	Tullibigeal-Lake Cargelligo Griffith
1996	Sonny Topuola	Narrandera
1997	Ray Thorpe	Tullibigeal-Lake Cargelligo
1998	Chris Richards	Yenda
1999	Brendan De Paoli	Leeton
2000	Warren Weir	Yanco-Wamoon
2001	Chris Richards	Yenda
2002	Greg Borger	Darlington Point-Coleambally
2003	Trent Lord Steve Richards	Narrandera Yenda
2004	Chris Richards	Yenda
2005	Trevor Richards Franky Fiumara Jason Fuller	Yenda Leeton Griffith
2006	Trevor Richards	Yenda
2007	Linton Price	Leeton
2008	Nathan Morris	Tullibigeal-Lake Cargelligo
2009	David Rauluni	Griffith Waratahs
2010	Dwayne Simpson Jaden Kelly	Griffith Waratahs Tullibigeal-Lake Cargelligo
2011	Andrew Lavaka	Yenda
2012	Chris Bamford	Bidgee Hurricanes
2013	Brent Pike	Tullibigeal-Lake Cargelligo
2014	Jaden Kelly	Tullibigeal-Lake Cargelligo
2015	Glenn Dumbrell	Yanco-Wamoon
2016	Glenn Dumbrell	Yanco-Wamoon
2017	Kose Lelei	Griffith Waratahs
2018	Jaden Kelly	Tullibigeal-Lake Cargelligo
2019	Hayden Philp	Leeton
2020	Not Awarded due to COVID-19 Pandemic	
2021	Hayden Philp Andrew Lavaka	Leeton Griffith
2022	Hayden Philp Braiden Jones	Leeton West Wyalong
2023	Guy Thompson-Collier	Darlington Point-Coleambally
2024	Guy Thompson-Collier	Darlington Point-Coleambally
2025	Ben Arandt	Hay
2026	John Wharepapa-Rawiri	Yanco-Wamoon

=== Ian Herd Memorial Rookie of the Year ===
Year	Rookie of the Year	
Year	Player	Club
1989	Brad Vivian Barry Smith	Darlington Point-Coleambally Narrandera
1990	Jason Boots Glen Schmetzer	Yanco-Wamoon Yanco-Wamoon
1991	Paul Kelly	Darlington Point-Coleambally
1992	Shane McCahon	West Wyalong
1993	Jason Richards	Griffith
1994	Greg Bradshaw	Leeton
1995	Martin Pettit	West Wyalong
1996	Simon Bonetti	Griffith
1997	Ryan Dissegna	Yanco-Wamoon
1998	Gary Johnson	Griffith
1999	Adam Sanson	Tullibigeal-Lake Cargelligo
2000	Aaron Wheatley	West Wyalong
2001	Tony Hayward	Tullibigeal-Lake Cargelligo
2002	Franky Fiumara	Leeton
2003	Greg Bonetti	Griffith
2004	Clinton Green	Leeton
2005	Jarred Carruthers	West Wyalong
2006	Jack Mitchell	Darlington Point-Coleambally
2007	Michael Mogliotti	Griffith
2008	Nathan Morris	Tullibigeal-Lake Cargelligo
2009	Michael Vitucci	Griffith Waratahs
2010	Mitchell Blackstock	West Wyalong
2011	Travis Lightfoot	Tullibigeal-Lake Cargelligo
2012	Drew Hopwood	Darlington Point-Coleambally
2013	Gregg Staines	Bidgee Hurricanes
2014	Dylan Hately	Tullibigeal-Lake Cargelligo
2015	Nathan Cauduro	Yenda
2016	Ben Vearing	Griffith Waratahs
2017	Matt Kelly	Darlington Point-Coleambally
2018	Lincon Kirby	Tullibigeal-Lake Cargelligo
2019	William Barnes	Yanco-Wamoon
2020	Not Awarded due to COVID-19 Pandemic	
2021	Not Awarded due to COVID-19 Pandemic	
2022	Elvis Nauer-Wood	Yenda
2023	Samuel Burley	Yenda
2024	Jesse Watson	Leeton
2025	Corey Charles	Griffith
2026	Bodhi Brady	Yenda

=== Rising Star Award ===
Year	Rookie of the Year	
Year	Player	Club
2003	David Milne	Griffith
2004	Chris Borgese	Leeton
2005	Brady Watt	Leeton
2006	Noa Fotu	Leeton
2007	Sam Basham	West Wyalong
2008	Kye Longford	Leeton
2009	Glenn Dumbrell	Yanco-Wamoon
2010	Jayden Clarke	Tullibigeal-Lake Cargelligo
2011	Lorenco Tafili	Griffith Waratahs
2012	Dylan Hately	Tullibigeal-Lake Cargelligo
2013	Shorne Ngu	Yenda
2014	Billy Gilbert	Leeton
2015	Zac Saddler	Leeton
2016	Jermaine Cook	Yenda
2017	Blake Wood	Yenda
2018	Ziggie Vincent Ben Arandt	Griffith Hay
2019	Kirtis Fisher	Leeton
2020	Not Awarded due to COVID-19 Pandemic	
2021	Not Awarded due to COVID-19 Pandemic	
2022	Chaise Sergi	Griffith
2023	Beniel Qereqeretabua	Leeton
2024	Jezaiah Charles	Griffith
2025	Ashton Harris	Tullibigeal-Lake Cargelligo
2026	Will Tulloch	West Wyalong

=== Club Championship ===
Year	Club
1975	Griffith
1976	Griffith
1977	Griffith Waratahs
1978	Griffith Waratahs
1979	Griffith Waratahs
1980	Darlington Point-Coleambally
1981	Leeton
1982	Griffith
1983	West Wyalong
1984	West Wyalong
1985	Griffith Waratahs
1986	Leeton
1987	Griffith Waratahs
1988	Tullibigeal-Lake Cargelligo
1989	Yanco-Wamoon
1990	Griffith
1991	Leeton
1992	Griffith Waratahs
1993	Griffith Waratahs
1994	Griffith Waratahs
1995	Yanco-Wamoon
1996	Griffith Waratahs
1997	Leeton
1998	Leeton
1999	Griffith Waratahs
2000	Leeton
2001	Leeton
2002	Leeton
2003	West Wyalong
2004	Leeton
2005	Leeton
2006	Leeton
2007	Leeton
2008	Leeton
2009	Leeton
2010	Yenda
2011	Yenda
2012	Leeton
2013	Leeton
2014	Leeton & West Wyalong
2015	Darlington Point-Coleambally
2016	Leeton
2017	Griffith
2018	Yenda
2019	West Wyalong
2020	Not Awarded due to COVID-19 Pandemic
2021	Not Awarded due to COVID-19 Pandemic
2022	Griffith
2023	Leeton
2024	Yenda
2025	Leeton
2026	Leeton

== Juniors ==
=== Group 20 Junior Rugby League ===
- Coleambally-Darlington Point JRL
- Griffith Waratahs Tigers Juniors
- Griffith Panthers JRL
- Hay Magpies JRL
- Leeton Raiders JRL
- Narrandera Lizards
- Tullibigeal-Lake Cargelligo Sharks JRL
- Yenda Blueheelers JRL

=== Juniors playing in NRL ===
Darlington Point Coleambally

- Brett Docherty

Griffith Black & Whites

- Simon Bonetti
- Geoff Foster
- Greg Keenan
- David Milne
- Laurie Moraschi
- Shaun Spence

Griffith Waratahs

- Ray Brown
- Andrew Fifita
- David Fifita
- Michael Henderson
- Ben Jeffery
- Terry Regan

==== Hay ====
- Brett Goldspink
- Rachael Pearson

Leeton

- Jeff Robson
- Mark Nicholls
- Mat Feagai
- Max Feagai
- Rod Maybon

Narrandera

- Michael Salafia
- Ronny Williams

==== Tullibigeal-Lake Cargelligo ====
- Malcolm Kelly
- Chris Marland
- Billy Phillips
- Zac Saddler
- Jason Wells

==== West Wyalong ====
- Bill Bray
- William Brogan
- Lionel Cooper
- Ron Crowe
- Cec Fifield
- Lou Goodwin
- Matt Goodwin
- Ron Pilon
- Col Ratcliff
- Aaron Wheatley

Yanco

- Kerry Hemsley
- David Barnhill
- Bryan Norrie

==== Yenda ====
- Eric Ferguson
- Michael Asomua

== Sources ==
Years	Item	Via
1967–69, 1971–96	Country Rugby League Annual Report	State Library of New South Wales
1983 to 2005	The Area News	Microfilm copies at State Library of NSW
2008 to 2019	The Area News	NewsBank, by proxy through State Library of NSW
2008 to 2019	The Irrigator	NewsBank, by proxy through State Library of NSW
1970 to 2001	Rugby League Week	Bound copies at State Library of NSW
2002 to 2015	Rugby League Week	eResources at State Library of NSW
2018 to 2019	Various Newspaper Websites	As referenced
2023 to present	Battlers For Bush Footy	As referenced

== See also ==
- Rugby League Competitions in Australia
- Group 9 Rugby League
- Group 17 Rugby League
