= Outten =

Outten is a surname. Notable people with the surname include:

- Keith Outten (1947–2022), Australian rugby league footballer
- Richard Outten, American screenwriter
- William Outten (1948–2020), American politician

== See also ==
- Outen
