= Griffith Waratah Tigers =

Australian rugby league football club based in Griffith, NSW

Club information
- Full name: Griffith Waratah Rugby League Football Club
- Colours: Orange; Black; White
- Founded: 1964

Current details
- Ground: Griffith Exies Oval
- Competition: Group 20 Rugby League

Records
- Premierships: 13 (1967, 1969, 1971–72, 1976-77-78, 1985, 2008, 2010, 2014–15, 2018)

The Griffith Waratah Tigers are a rugby league football club based in the town of Griffith, in the Riverina region of New South Wales, Australia. he club was formed in November 1963 and entered the Group 20 competition in 1964, which is administered by the NSW Rugby League (NSWRL) The Waratah Tigers are the most successful team in the history of Group 20, having won 13 First Grade premierships as of 2025.

== History ==
=== Formation ===
The Griffith Waratah Tigers were formed in November 1963 at the top of the Area Hotel in Banna Avenue in Griffith.

An article in The Area News from that time recounted the events as follows:

“A public meeting at the Area Hotel last Friday night unanimously elected to form a second rugby league football club in Griffith. The meeting, which was attended by 83 people including Group executives, Griffith Leagues Club and Griffith rugby league club executives, and many first-grade players, discussed the matter for some time, before the chairman of the meeting, Bill Jafftey put the decision to a vote."

=== Early success ===
The new club entered the Group 20 Rugby League competition in 1964, and by 1967, had won its first premiership (technically in a competition called Riverina Zone 3 due to the Murrumbidgee Rugby League schism of the 1960s). Further premierships followed in 1969, 1971 and 1972.

Then in the late 1970s, under the captain-coaching of Bob Priest, the Waratah Tigers won three straight Premierships in 1976, 1977 and 1978. The club won the 1985 premiership over Darlington Point-Coleambally, under the coaching of Warren Jowett, before beginning a 23-year premiership drought.

=== 1990s: Close but yet so far ===
In the 1990s, the Waratah Tigers made five Grand Finals in seven years, with the first three occurring in a row from 1992 to 1994, all resulting in losses to Yanco-Wamoon, who went on to win five straight First Grade titles. The club then qualified for the 1997 Grand Final, falling painstakingly short against Leeton 25-18, before experiencing the same heartbreak in 1999, losing 20-18 against Narrandera.

=== 2008-2019: Golden Era ===
In 2008, the Waratah Tigers qualified for their first Grand Final since 1999, where they would face Yenda, who were playing in their seventh Grand Final in eight seasons. Led by a young Andrew Fifita, the Waratahs beat the 2008 Clayton Cup winners 40-36 in a high-scoring affair.

The two sides played off again the following year, with Yenda getting the spoils on that occasion 24-20. However, in 2010, the clubs faced off for the third straight year, and the Waratahs had the last laugh, winning 30-16, with former Gold Coast Titans and Wests Tigers star Ben Jeffery winning the Barry Hails Medal as best on ground.

After a couple of years of West Wyalong and Tullibigeal-Lake Cargelligo dominance, the Tigers returned to the Grand Final in 2014, knocking off the previously undefeated West Wyalong side 22-18 in a tense Grand Final at EW Moore Oval to win the club's 11th premiership. The Waratahs then went back-to-back for the first time since their late 1970s hat-trick, defeating Darlington Point-Coleambally 50-22 in the decider the following year.

In 2017, the club made another Grand Final, the first cross-town derby Grand Final against the Griffith Black & Whites since 1977, with their arch-rival taking home the crown 28-10. The Tigers bounced back the following year to defeat Yenda 30-20 and win their 13th, and to date, their last premiership, before going down to Darlington Point-Coleambally 30-18 in the 2019 decider.

=== 2020-present: Pandemic, struggles, recess and the return ===
In 2020, the COVID-19 pandemic hit, causing the Group 20 season to be cancelled. Although the competition returned the following year, it was again cancelled before he finals.

In 2022, the competition completed its first season since 2019, with Waratahs qualifying for the finals before making an early exit.

Then in 2023, the club was forced to withdraw from the Group 20 competition due to a player number crisis, meaning it was the first season that the Waratahs did not enter Group 20 since their foundation in 1964. However, with the club set to fold, President Robert Nascimben and a committee of passionate volunteers, including Mark Jaffrey, Trevor Rice and others, refused to let the club die. In late 2023, the club hired Willie Lolohea as coach for the following year and announced their plans to return to the competition.

The club made a return to Group 20 in 2024, fielding three of six grades; First Grade, Reserve Grade and Ladies League Tag.

== Premierships ==
=== First Grade ===
- 1967 – Waratahs vs. Leeton (at Exies Oval; score: 32–2) coached by Fred Griffiths.
- 1969 – Waratahs vs. Griffith (at Leeton Cricket Ground; score: 18–9); coached by Bob Lanigan.
- 1971 – Waratahs vs. Griffith (at Exies Oval; score: 13–11); coached by Reg McCulla.
- 1972 – Waratahs vs. Griffith (at Exies Oval; score: 8–2); coached by Kevin Le Jeune.
- 1976 – Waratahs vs. Griffith (at Narrandera; score 16–6); coached by Bob Priest.
- 1977 – Waratahs vs. Griffith (at Exies Oval; score 34–15); coached by Bob Priest.
- 1978 – Waratahs vs. Leeton (at Exies Oval; score 29–10); coached by Bob Priest.
- 1985 – Waratahs vs. Darlington Point-Coleambally (at score 20–12); coached by Warren Jowett.
- 2008 – Waratahs vs. Yenda (at EW Moore Oval; score 40–36); coached by Mark Palmer.
- 2010 – Waratahs vs. Yenda (at EW Moore Oval; score 30–16); coached by Kodie Charles.
- 2014 – Waratahs vs. West Wyalong (at EW Moore Oval; score 22–18); coached by Kose Lelei.
- 2015 – Waratahs vs. Darlington Point-Coleambally (at EW Moore Oval; score 50–22); coached by Kose Lelei.
- 2018 – Waratahs vs. Yenda (at EW Moore Oval; score 30–20); coached by Kose Lelei.

=== Lower Grades ===
Reserve Grade: 1966, 1977, 1978, 1979, 1982, 1991, 1993, 1994, 1995, 1996, 1999, 2010, 2016, 2018

Ladies League Tag: None

Under 18s: 1967, 1969, 1970, 1973, 1975, 1978, 1979, 1998, 2002, 2005, 2006, 2007, 2014

Under 16s: 1968, 1969, 1972, 1973, 1977, 1984, 1988, 2000, 2002, 2003, 2004, 2007, 2008, 2009

== Team Selections ==
=== Sav Salvestro's best XIII ===
Selections cover all eras.

1 Fred Griffiths; 2 Dennis Mootz, 3 Tony Saxvik, 4 Ross Warburton, 5 Brian Rossetto; 6 Bob Priest, 7 Reg McCulla; 13 Reg Cooper, 12 Gary Saunders, 11 Dennis Calabria, 10 Brian Milthorpe, 9 Ray Brown, 8 Len Bertoldo. Reserves: Peter Thompson, Frank Carnelutti, Bob Lanigan, Lindsay Meyn.

=== Jock McDonald's Best Team Since 1980 ===
Selections since 1980.

1 Anthony Rickey; 2 Rod Charles, 3 Phil Hurst, 4 Lindsay Meyn, 5 Brian Rossetto; 6 Chris Ross, 7 Mark Townsend; 13 Richard Northey, 12 Michael Scarfone, 11 Errol Hillier, 10 Rex Williams, 9 Tony Moers, 8 Warren Jowett (c). Reserves: Mark Harrigan, Robbie McRae, Mark Jones

=== Best Ever 'Wogatahs' Team ===
BEST-EVER WOGATAHS TEAM: Peter Moraschi; Pat Catanzariti, Barry Calabria, Brian Rossetto, Kevin Rossetto; Kevin Calabria, Mick Agostini; Will Pilosio, Micheal Scarfone, Dennis Calabria, Len Bertoldo ©, Tony Sergi, Larry Salvestro. Reserves Joe Pangello, John Trimboli, Frank Carnelutti.

-Selectors: The Mario Brothers

== Notable players ==
- Len Bertoldo
- Ray Brown
- Andrew Fifita
- Geoff Foster
- Fred Griffiths
- Michael Henderson
- Ben Jeffery
- Bob Lanigan
- Takilele Katoa

== See also ==
- Group 20 Rugby League
- Hay Magpies
