= West Wyalong Mallee Men =

Australian rugby league football club based in West Wyalong, NSW

Club information
- Full name: West Wyalong Rugby League Football Club
- Nickname: Mallee Men
- Colours: Red; Black
- Founded: 1911

Current details
- Ground: Ron Crowe Oval
- Competition: Group 20 Rugby League

Records
- Premierships: 11 (1938, 1960, 1965–66 (Group 9); 1968, 1970, 1984, 1989, 2005, 2011–12 (Group 20))

The West Wyalong Mallee Men are a rugby league club based in the town of West Wyalong in the Riverina region of New South Wales, Australia. Founded in 1911, the team is the joint oldest in the state outside of Sydney and Newcastle alongside the North Tamworth Bears.

== History ==
Organized rugby league began in West Wyalong in 1911, after the game rapidly spread to the area's goldfields from Sydney. The current club is a continuation of the body that was formed to govern the game in the region at this early stage.

West Wyalong joined the Group 9 Rugby League in the 1920s and won four premierships in the competition in 1938, 1960, 1965 and 1966. It was also during this period that West Wyalong competed for the famed Maher Cup, playing 152 challenge matches, fourth all-time only behind Cootamundra, Young and Gundagai.

In 1966, with the advent of the breakaway Murrumbidgee Rugby League which involved a number of clubs from both Group 9 and Group 20, the Group 9 competition, won by West Wyalong in all three grades, was severely weakened.

Thus, in 1967, the remaining eight Group 9 clubs were split up, with some going to Group 8, while West Wyalong, along with Temora and Barmedman, joined Group 20 to form Group 9/20. West Wyalong won the Group 9/20 First Grade competition in 1968 and 1970.

However, once the rebel clubs were brought back into the establishment at the end of the 1970 season, boundary redistributions meant that West Wyalong remained in Group 20, where the club has competed ever since.

In that time, West Wyalong has won five further Group 20 premierships, in 1984, 1989, 2005, 2011 and 2012.

== Premierships ==
First Grade (11): 1938, 1960, 1965, 1966; 1968, 1970, 1984, 1989, 2005, 2011, 2012

Reserve Grade (13): 1950, 1966, 1967, 1983, 1984, 1985, 1986, 1987, 2003, 2012, 2013, 2014, 2015

Ladies League Tag (1): 2013

Under 18 (7): 1962, 1965, 1966, 1981, 1999, 2000, 2008

Under 16 (4): 1971, 1974, 1982, 1993

== Annual Events ==
Since 1970, the West Wyalong club holds a pre-season knockout tournament, with teams from all over the state travelling to participate in the two-day festival of football at Ron Crowe Oval.

West Wyalong also plays annual pre-season fixtures against Group 9 side Temora for the Kelly Cup, and Group 17 club Rankins Springs for the Kiawarra Cup.

=== West Wyalong Knockout Winners 1970-2010 ===
- 1970: West Wyalong
- 1973: Bathurst Railway
- 1974: Temora
- 1975: Dubbo CYMS
- 1976: Cootamundra
- 1977: Forbes
- 1978: Dubbo Macquarie
- 1979: Dubbo Macquarie
- 1980: Dubbo Macquarie
- 1981: Dubbo Westside
- 1982: Dubbo Macquarie
- 1983: Darlington Point-Coleambally
- 1984: Parkes
- 1985: Forbes
- 1986: Forbes
- 1987: Temora
- 1988: Forbes
- 1989: Blayney
- 1990: West Belconnen
- 1991: Griffith Waratahs
- 1992: West Wyalong
- 1993: Temora
- 1994: West Wyalong
- 1995: Cowra
- 1996: Blayney
- 1997: Bathurst Penguins
- 1998: Orange Hawks
- 1999: Cootamundra
- 2000: Wagga Kangaroos
- 2001: Cowra
- 2002: Bathurst St Pats
- 2003: Temora
- 2004: Newcastle
- 2005: Yanco-Wamoon
- 2006: Newcastle
- 2007: Newcastle
- 2008: Wagga Brothers
- 2009: Wagga Kangaroos
- 2010: Wagga Kangaroos

== Notable players ==
- Bill Bray
- Bob Broad
- Keith Broad
- William Brogan
- Lionel Cooper
- Ron Cooper
- Ron Crowe
- David Curry
- Bob Farrar
- Cec Fifield
- Lou Goodwin
- Matt Goodwin
- Len Jamieson
- Tom Leggo
- Clyde Lemon
- Rod Pilon
- Ron Pilon
- Col Ratcliff
- Alan Ridley
- Ray Steele
- Bob Taber
- Aaron Wheatley

== See also ==
- Group 20 Rugby League
- Northern Riverina Football League
