= Coleambally Solar Farm =

Solar power station in New South Wales, Australia

- Country: Australia
- Coordinates: 34°46′S 145°56′E
- Status: Operational
- Commission date: November 2018
- Owner: Neoen
- Operator: Neoen

Solar farm
- Type: Standard PV
- Solar tracker: Single-axis
- Site area: 513 ha (1,270 acres)

Power generation
- Nameplate capacity: 150 MW

External links
- Website: coleamballysolarfarm.com.au

Colleambally Solar Farm is a photovoltaic power station near the town of Coleambally in New South Wales, Australia. It is on the western side of the Kidman Way north of the town.

It has an output of 189MWp and was the largest solar power station in Australia when it was commissioned in November 2018. It is owned by Neoen and was built by Bouygues. It has a 12-year power purchase agreement to sell its output to EnergyAustralia.

The power station consists of a total of 565,488 solar panels arranged into 19,086 strings of panels. Each solar tracker drives three strings.
