= Coleambally =

- Town
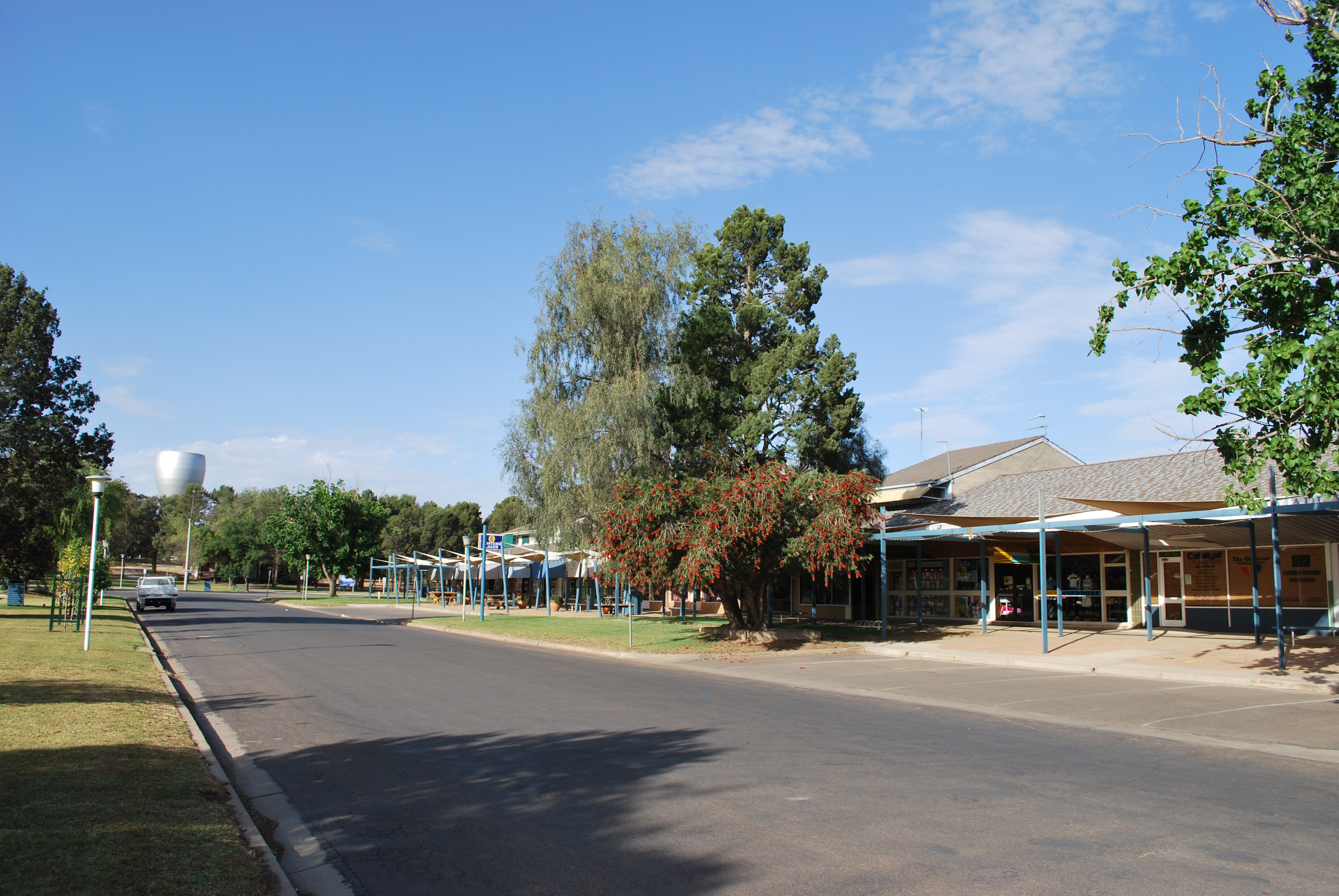
- Main street of Coleambally looking toward the distinctive water tower

- Coordinates: 34°48′0″S 145°53′0″E
- Country: Australia
- State: New South Wales
- LGA: Murrumbidgee Council
- Location: 658 km (409 mi) from Sydney; 65 km (40 mi) from Griffith; 74 km (46 mi) from Jerilderie; 27 km (17 mi) from Waddi
- Established: 1968

Government
  - State electorate: Murray
  - Federal division: Farrer

Population
  - Total: 1,331 (2016 census)
- Postcode: 2707
- County: Boyd

Coleambally (/ˌkɒliˈæmbəli/) is a small town in the Riverina of New South Wales, Australia, in Murrumbidgee Local Government Area.

Coleambally is one of the newest towns in the state of New South Wales, officially opened in June 1968, with the Post Office opening on 1 April 1970.

Designed to act as the centre for the surrounding Coleambally Irrigation Area, at the 2016 census, Coleambally had a population of 1331.

Its name is Aboriginal, probably meaning a swift in flight. The spine-tailed swift is one of the most powerful fliers known, wheeling and sweeping at high speed in search of flying insects.

Coleambally can be accessed by road from Sydney and Canberra via the Hume Highway and Burley Griffin Way and from Melbourne via the Hume Highway, Newell Highway and the Kidman Way.

Coleambally is home to some of the most endangered species in Australia, the Bittern, Southern Bell Frog and it has many other species of native flora and fauna. Coleambally has many kangaroos and birds, galahs and noisy miners.

== History ==
The Coleambally Irrigation Area scheme was started in the 1950s, with potential farmland being made available through a ballot system. Those who entered the ballot had to prove they had enough money to set up a farm in order to enter, as the land they acquired started off with no fencing or infrastructure whatsoever. The successful ballot winners were also required to give up any other primary interests they may have held. They were to give all or nothing to Coleambally.

In 2008, following the Federal Government's proposals to buy large amounts of water from irrigators – ostensibly to "save" the Murray-Darling Basin — the Coleambally Irrigation Area offered the entire area, including the farms, water rights and the entire town, for sale at a price of $3.5 billion.

== Population ==
In the 2021 Census, there were 1,152 people in Coleambally. A total of 51.3% were males and 48.1% were female. The median age was 43. 86.7% of people were born in Australia and 89.3% of people spoke only English at home.

== Commerce ==
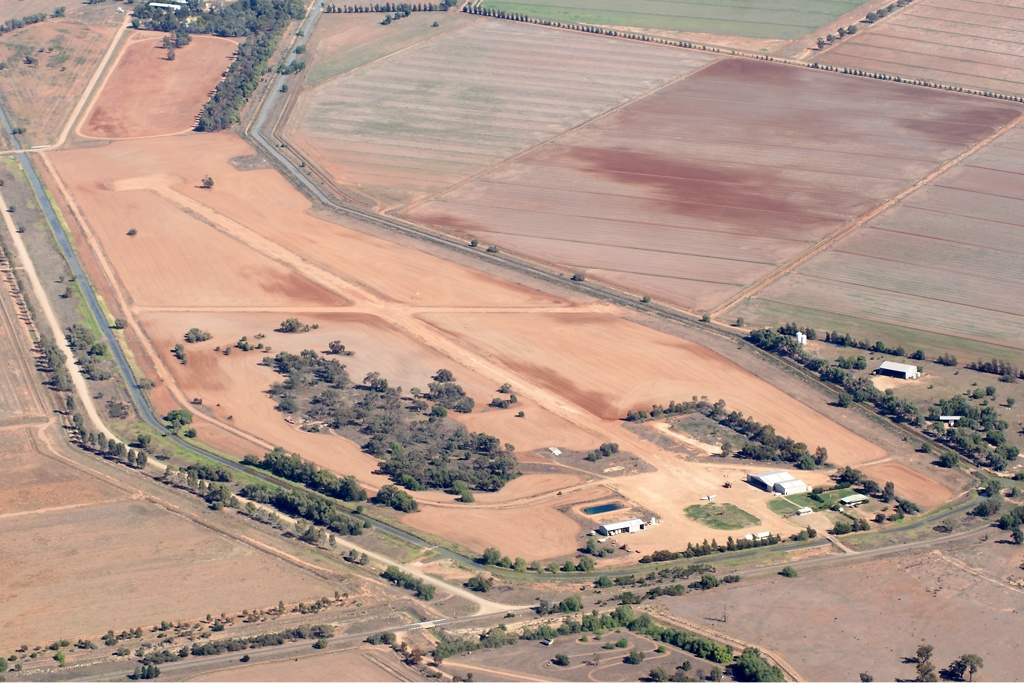
Coleambally Airfield overview

Its main industry has been rice growing, with a major rice mill located one kilometre north of the town. However, the rice mill has been closed and converted to a ruminant feed mill in 2019.

In 2018, the Coleambally Solar Farm was commissioned a few kilometres north of the town. At the time of its commissioning, it was the largest solar farm in Australia.

== Education ==
There are two schools in Coleambally: Coleambally Central School, a comprehensive government school catering for students from Kindergarten to Year 12, and St Peter's Primary School, a Roman Catholic school administered by the Diocese of Wagga Wagga.

== Churches ==
Coleambally is situated in the Anglican Diocese of Riverina. The Anglican Church is dedicated to St Mark.

The Roman Catholic Church is dedicated to St Peter.

The church of the Uniting Church in Australia was formerly a shearer's quarters before being moved to its present location.

== Attractions ==
Coleambally's distinctive wine glass shaped water tower is located in the centre of town. A Bucyrus Class Erie Dragline is located in the Lions Park at the entrance of the town. It is one of four machines imported from the United States in 1935 to excavate the main irrigation channels in the Murray Valley and the Coleambally Irrigation Area in the early 1960s.

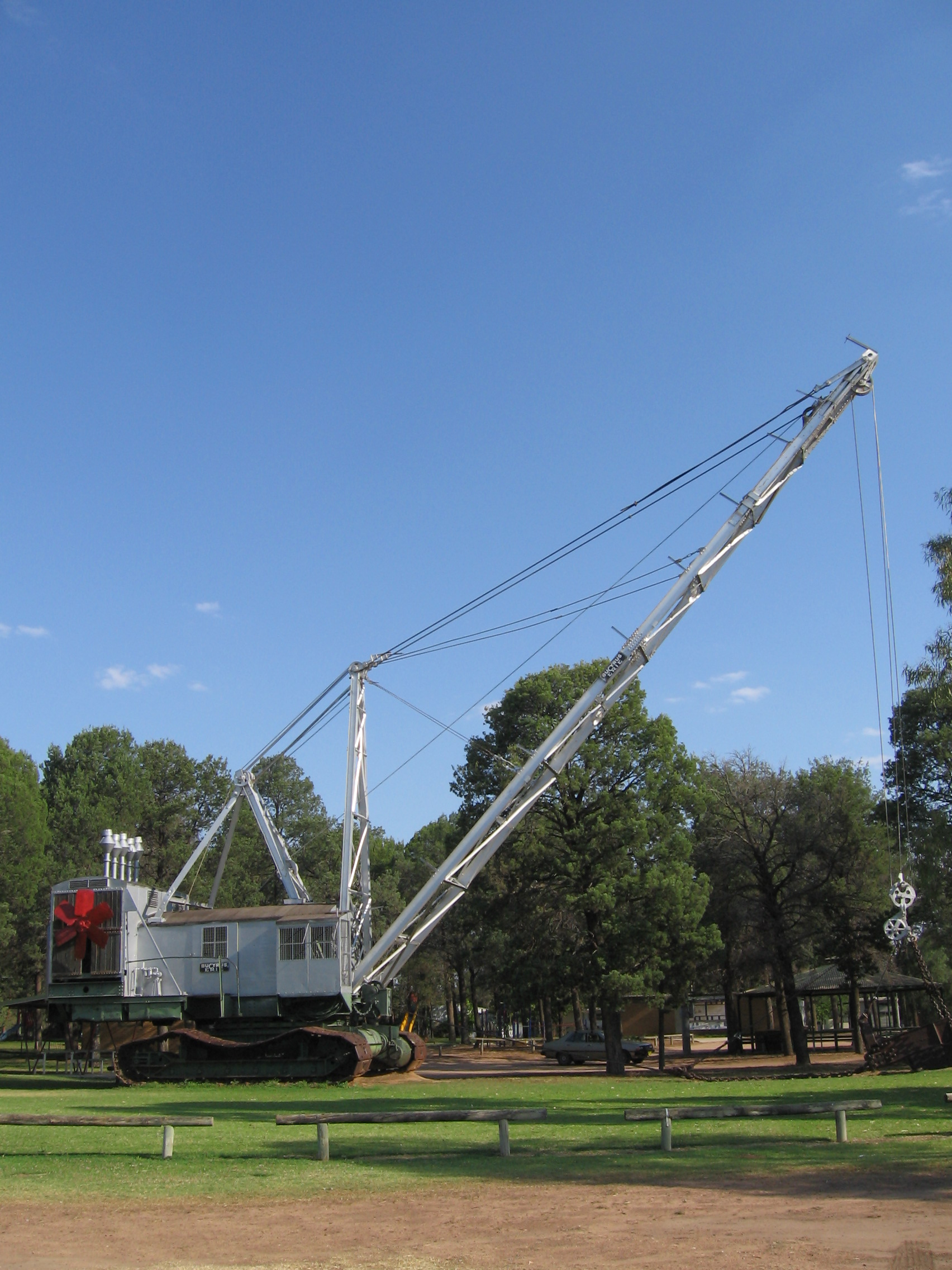
The Bucyrus Class Dragline at Coleambally. This is one of four used to excavate the main irrigation channels in the area.

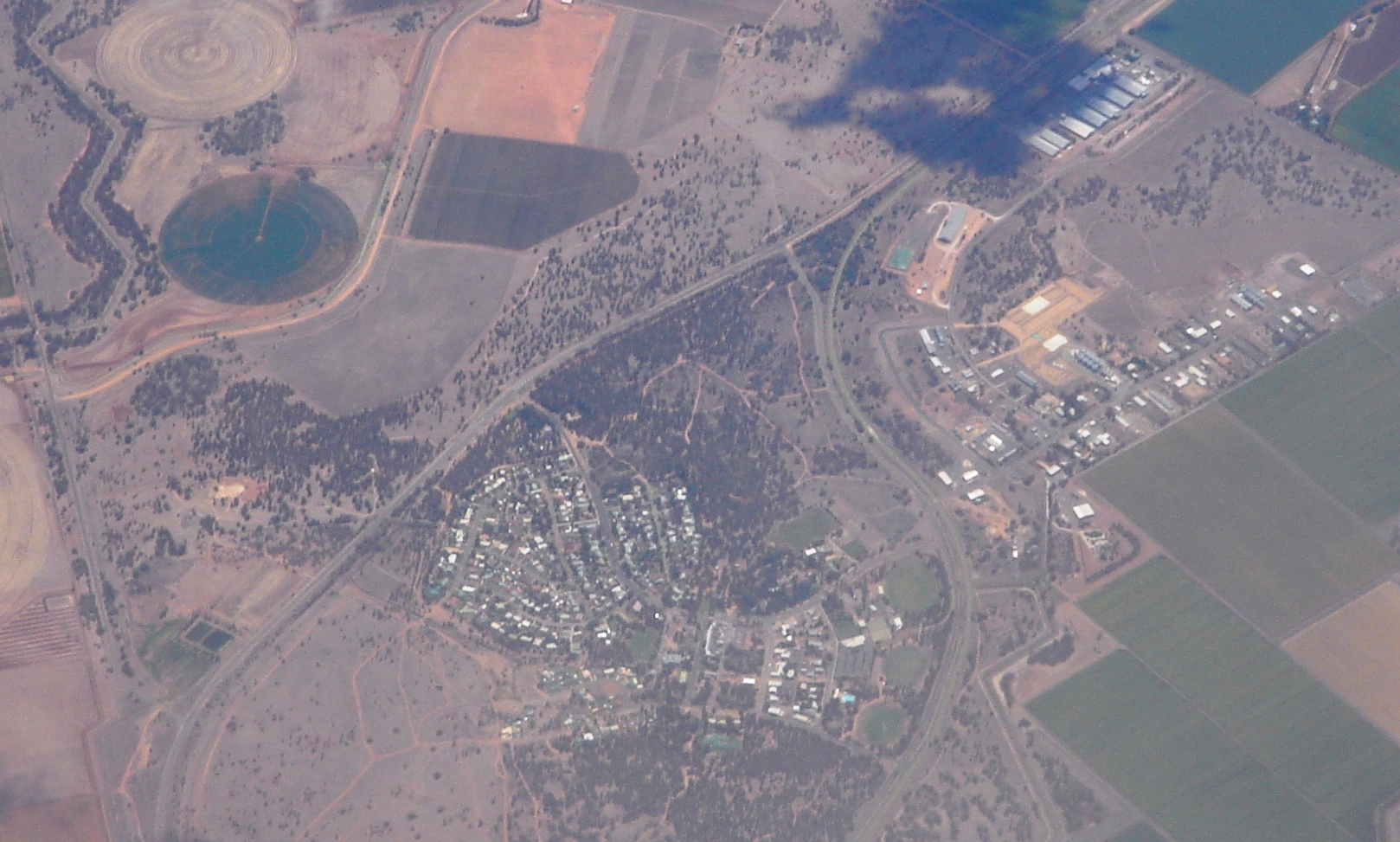
Aerial view of Coleambally.

== Sport ==
=== Darlington Point-Coleambally Roosters ===
The Darlington Point-Coleambally Roosters compete in the Group 20 Rugby League competition, and were founded via a merger between Darlington Point and the Coleambally Greens in 1973. The club has won 6 First Grade Premierships, in 1980, 1983, 1987, 1988, 2019 and 2024.

Prior to the merger Coleambally was represented by the Coleambally Greens in the Group 17 Rugby League competition.

Leagues

- Coleambally Greens
  - 1965-1972 - Group 17 Rugby League
- Darlington Point-Coleambally Roosters
  - 1973-present: Group 20 Rugby League

Premierships

- Darlington Point-Coleambally Roosters
  - First Grade: 1980, 1983, 1987, 1988, 2019, 2024
  - Reserve Grade: 2008, 2019
  - Under 18s: 1987
  - Under 16s: 1981, 2011, 2013, 2014

=== Coleambally Football Netball Club ===
The Coleambally FNC was established in 1965 and they have played in the following competitions -

- 1965 to 1971– Barellan & District Football League
- 1972 to 1979– Coreen & District Football League
- 1980 to 1983– Murray Football League
- 1984 to 2007– Coreen & District Football League
- 2008 to 2010– Hume Football League
- 2011 to present - Farrer Football League

Football Premierships

- Coreen & District Football League
  - Seniors
    - 1976, 1977, 1979, 1988, 1993, 2005
  - Reserves
    - 1998, 1999, 2003, 2006
  - Thirds / Under 16's
    - 1995, 2001
- Farrer Football League
  - Under 18s
    - 2025
    - 2026
