= Hay Magpies =

Australian rugby league football club

Club information
- Full name: Hay Magpies Rugby League Football Club
- Colours: Black; White
- Founded: 1931

Current details
- Ground: Hay Park Oval No.1
- Competition: Group 20 Rugby League; Formerly of Group 17 Rugby League

Records
- Premierships: 12

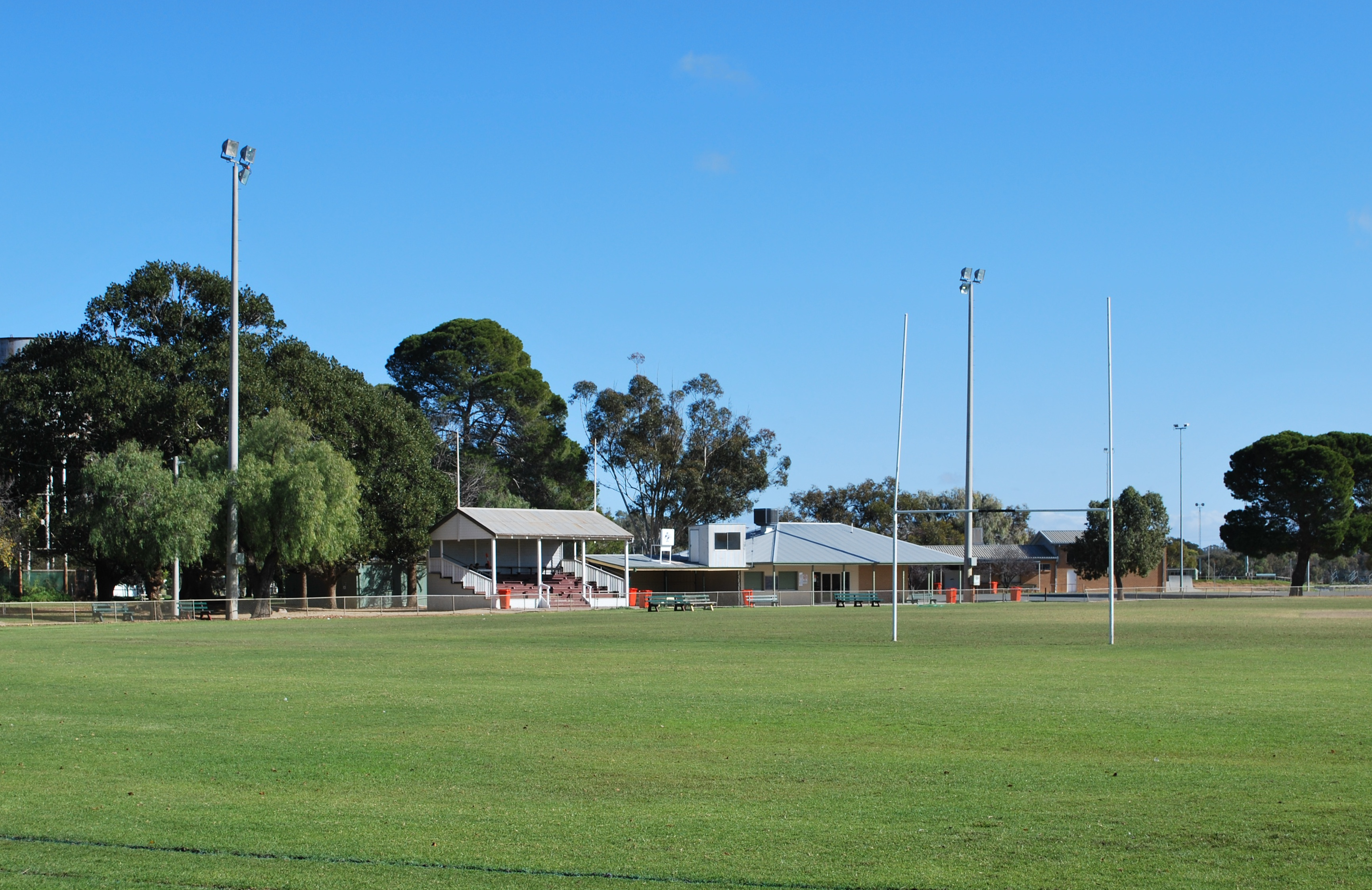
The Hay Magpies home ground

The Hay Magpies is a rugby league football club based in the town of Hay, in the western Riverina of New South Wales, Australia. Since 2007 the club has competed in Group 20 in South Western NSW, which is governed by the NSW Rugby League (formerly Country Rugby League).

Prior to this the club had competed in Group 17. The Hay Magpies were the most successful team in the history of Group 17, winning 12 premierships. The team colours are black and white and the club is named after the ubiquitous Australian magpie.

== History of rugby league in Hay ==
Rugby league was first played in Hay during 1931, a tentative beginning in a township where the dominant football code was Australian Rules. It wasn't until 1936 that Hay Rugby League Club was officially formed and matches scheduled on a more regular basis. The core advocates of the new club were the young school-teacher Sam Willis, three publicans 'Silver' Sullivan, Dan Sutherland and Jim Dixon, and a road-contractor, Bill Jackson. Dan Sutherland was elected first president. The colours of maroon and white were chosen for Hay's uniform (from Willis' old school team, Fort Street Boys High). Jim Dixon and another avid league supporter, Frank Walker, donated ornate silver trophies for an inter-town competition between Hay and the surrounding townships of Hillston, Merriwagga and Goolgowi. The same trophies later became objects of contestation in the Group 20 competition.

Senior rugby league was suspended in the district during World War II. In 1947 district clubs reformed into what was known as the Western Zone competition, comprising Hay, Darlington Point, Goolgowi, Carrathool and two teams from Hillston ('Town' and 'Country'). Hay won the premiership in 1950 under the coaching of 'Johnno' Johnston; playing in black and white jerseys they had a hard-fought 7–5 win over their arch-rivals Goolgowi.

In 1954 the CRL reshuffled the boundaries and formed the Group 20 competition comprising the Western Zone teams plus Ivanhoe, Deniliquin, Barellan and Coleambally. In 1959 Hay won their first Group 17 title under the coaching of Laurie Foley. The win was the first of a hat-trick of premierships for the Magpies and the beginning of the club's 'golden' era.

=== Modern history ===
Debut Season in Group 20

In 2011, the club gained full Group status with a First Grade, Reserve Grade, Under 18, Under 16 and League Tag combinations.

Former Welsh International prop (eleven caps) Gareth Price was appointed Captain/coach of the first grade team.

The season started with the Magpies playing an all star team coached by Arthur Beetson, captained by Mal Meninga, and containing superstars Gary Belcher Laurie Daley, Bradley Clyde, Marcus Bai, Matt Geyer, Ken Nagas, Andrew McFadden, Jason Croker, David Furner, Ben Roarty, Mark Tookey, Simon Woolford, Quentin Pongia and Shane Millard, with the match referee Bill Harrigan.

The game was won by All Stars 50–8 (Ken Nagas 2, David Furner 2, Bradley Clyde, Matt Geyer, Simon Woolford, *Mitchell Rosser, * Setelo Tuimoala (Hay players*) tries, David Furner 4, Matt Geyer 2, Andrew McFadden goals) Hay Magpies 8 (Ryan Gash, Damien Kennedy tries). Crowd (estimated) 2500...labelled "fantastic weekend of rugby league"

== Supporters and culture ==
=== Pie in the Sky Match ===
Players used in Pie in the Sky matches have been David Furner, Andrew McFadden, Wayne (Snoopy) Collins (2006 v Goolgowi); Gary Belcher and Darren Smith (2007 v Griffith Black and Whites); Mark Toooookey (2008 v TLU ) Simon Woolford, Shane (Billy) Millard and Ben Roarty (2009 v DPC).

Former Melbourne Storm premiership player Ben Roarty played the season with the Magpies in 2009 and was a member of the premiership (Hay's first team playing in reserves) winning side.

== Notable players ==
=== Players to play First Grade NSWRL/ARL ===
- Bob Lee (Parramatta 1964)
- Ken Flanagan (Easts 1966)
- Nicholas Edwards (Western Suburbs 1998)
- Brett Goldspink (Illawarra (1992/93), South Sydney 1994) Western Reds 1995/96)

=== Players to play English Super League ===
- Brett Goldspink (Oldham 1997, St Helens 1998, Wigan 1999, Halifax 2000–02)

=== Team of the Century ===
The Club named "The Little General", Neil-John Nisbet as Magpie of the Century. The team of the century named was:

Fullback Alf Dancey, Wingers Philip Carver, Dean Whitehead, Centres Laurie Foley (Captain) and Colin Wright Five Eight Les Jackson, Half Back Neil John Nisbet, Lock Neil Scobie, Second row Michael Johnston and Michael Fitzpatrick, Props Billy Curtis Allen (Nugget) Schiller, Hooker Danny Byrnes.

Reserves – Geoff Snowden, Gary Crawford, Billy Poole, Fred Hobbs, Peter (Zi) Scott, John Curtis. Coach : Kevin Goldspink

=== Hay Magpies Rugby League Club Hall of Fame members ===
H S (Sam) Willis, J V (Johnno) Johnson, Allen (Nugget) Schiller, Bill Curtis, John Curtis, Neil-John Nisbet, Michael (Salty) Ireson, Robert Matthews, Derek Moriarty, Dean Whitehead, Colin Wright, Peter (Parra) Montgomery, Geoff Snowdon, Danny Byrnes, Laurie Foley and Michael Johnston, Ken Beissel, *Cecil Kem, *Wayne Dunbar, *Donald Payne, *Ron Gash, *Harold James (Jimmy) Little, James Frederick (Fred) Scott, Patrick Keith (Packy) Bunyan

=== Senior Riverina representatives (while at Magpies) ===
1967 Geoff Snowdon, Phillip Carver (both played against touring NZ Kiwis) 1975 Michael Johnston, Neil Scobie (both played against touring Great Britain team) 1983 Dean Whitehead (fullback for Riverina in CRL Championship match V Newcastle) 2016 Matt Wakefield, Luke Serevi (Riverina team playing in 2016 Country Championship) 2019 Harley Hey 2016 Rachael Pearson, Megan Pearson (Riverina LeagueTag team in Country Championship) Luci Lugsdin (2019/2021), Ellie Darlow, Jessie Carter (Riverina Bulls Country Tackling Championships)

== Group 17 Rugby League First-Grade Premierships ==
- 1959 – Hay vs. Ivanhoe (score: 7–5); coached by Laurie Foley.
- 1960 – Hay vs. Darlington Point; coached by Billy Poole.
- 1961 – Hay vs. Goolgowi; coached by Billy Poole.
- 1967 – Hay vs. Coleambally (score: 17–9); coached by Geoff Snowdon.
- 1972 – Hay vs. Deniliquin (26–9). coached by Bill Curtis.
- 1975 – Hay vs. Goolgowi (score: 25–11); coached by Michael Johnston.
- 1982 – Hay vs. Hillston (score: 22–14); coached by Kevin Goldspink.
- 1989 – Hay vs. Goolgowi (at Rankins Springs; score 20–18) coached by Neil John Nisbet.
- 1990 – Hay vs. Goolgowi (at Barellan) coached by Neil John Nisbet.
- 1991 – Hay vs. Hillston (at Goolgowi; score 14–6) coached by Neil John Nisbet.
- 1994 – Hay vs. Hillston (at Rankins Springs; score 29–18); coached by Chris Aylett
- 1995 – Hay vs. Rankins Springs (at Barellan; score 38–10); coached by Jack Byrnes

== Group 20 Rugby League Premierships ==
=== Group 20 Reserve Grade premierships ===
- 2009 – Hay v Griffith Black and Whites at E W Moore Oval Griffith won 26–24 (coach: Ian Woods (non-playing))

=== Group 20 Under 18 premierships ===
- 2010 – Hay v Griffith Waratah Tigers at E W Moore Oval Griffith won 22–18 (coaches: Rene Woods/Jermaine Dixon, Strength and Conditioning coach Robert 'Fruity' Anderson)

=== Group 20 League Tag premierships ===
- 2015 Hay Magpies defeated Leeton Greens at E W Moore Oval Griffith 12–4. (Coaches: Rachael Pearson/Neil-John Nisbet)....(Rachael Pearson 2 tries, 2 conversions – Awarded Player of the Match in the Grand Final.)
- 2016 Hay Magpies defeated Leeton Greens at E W Moore Oval Griffith 12–0 (Luci Lugsdin, Rachael Pearson tries Pearson 1 goal) Man of the Match Luci Lugsdin

== Playing record ==
Playing record compiled from scores published in the Rugby League Week.

Year	Group	Ladder Position	Points	Final Position	Report
1983	17	1	24	Finalist	TAN
1984	17	7	10		TAN
1985	17	2	21	Grand Finalist
1986	17
1987	17	4	16	Semi-Finalist
1988	17	1	22	Finalist
1989	17		30	Premiers
1990	17	1st or 2nd		Premiers
1991	17	1	25	Premiers
1992	17	2	21	Finalist
1993	17	3	16	Grand Finalist	TAN
1994	17	4	13	Premiers	YT TAN
1995	17	3	16	Premiers	YT TAN
1996	17	4	17	Semi-Finalist
1997	17	3	18	Finalist	TAN
1998	17
1999	17
2000	17	7	4
2001	17	7	8
2002	17
2003	17	1	19	Finalist
2004	17	2	18	Finalist	TAN
2005	17	6	13
2006	17	5	8
2007	20 (2nds)
2008	20 (2nds)
2009	20 (2nds)			Premiers
2010	20 (2nds)
2011	20	8	8
2012	20	9	6
2013	20	6	16
2014	20	5th - Lost Semi Final	18
2015	20	8	12
2016	20	9	0
2017	20	9	4
2018	20	9	6
2019	20	6	18
2020	20	Not Played: COVID-19
2021	20 (2nds)	4th - Lost Semi Final
2022	20	7th
2023	20	6th

== Records ==
=== Group 20 League tag records held By Rachael Pearson (as at 30 June 2018) ===
Group 20 Player of the Year...2010, 2011, 2014 and 2015, 2016

Most tries scored in a match – 6 (v Yanco Wamoon 2015)

Most goals in a match – 12/12 v Griffith Waratah Tigers 2016)

Most points in a match 40 (6 tries 8 goals v Yanco Wamoon 2015), 40 (4 tries 12 conversions V Waratah Tigers 2016)

Pearson is the only player in the Group 20 competition, up until the 2017 competition, to have posted 100 points in a season – and she has done it every full season she has played – with the exception of 2010 when kicks for goal were not allowed. That season she scored 88 from 22 tries. In 2011 she posted 184 in competition matches PLUS another 34 during the final series. 2012/2013 she was absent during studies in Canberra. She returned in 2014 and posted 138 points, plus another 10 in the finals. 2015 Rachael's tally reached 194 – before finals. 2016 Rachael scored a record 262 points (30 tries 71 goals) 2017 Injury in final game of the season ended her year. She finished with 194 points (23 tries 51 goals) 2018 Rachael equalled her own point scoring record of 262 points - (28 tries, 2 field goals, 74 goals) Rachael joined St George Illawarra Dragons in the NRLW competition, playing in the Grand Final and finishing as runner up to Sydney Roosters. Rachael was named in the NSW State of Origin squad in 2022 and named the Young Gun Player of the Year for the Dragons.

=== First Grade coaches in Group Twenty ===
2011 - Gareth Price

2012 - Rene Woods

2013 - Neil John Nisbet/Moe Clune

2014 - Phil Crosby (Semi Finalists in Group 20, first time in Club history – Defeated by Darlington Point/Coleambally and eliminated)

2015 - Phil Crosby

2016 - Matt Wakefield

2017 - Harley Hey

2018 - Neil-John Nisbet

2019 - James McLean/Shayne Kennedy

2020- No competition COVID

2021-Timothy Lomai/Jamie Woods (Played Reserve Grade only)

2022 - James McLean/Jamie Woods (First Grade)

2023 - Ben Taylor/Toby Crighton (Neil-John Nisbet - Director)

2024 - Ben Taylor/Toby Crighton (Neil-John Nisbet - Director)

2025 - Chris Stewart (First Grade Grand Finalists)

2026 - Zac O'Neill

2027 - James "Tuck" McLean
