= Simon Bonetti =

Australian rugby league footballer

Personal information
- Full name: Simon Bonetti
- Born: 10 January 1977 (age 49) Griffith, New South Wales, Australia

Playing information
- Position: Hooker
Club
Years	Team	Pld	T	G	FG	P
1997–02	Sydney Roosters	142	2	0	0	8

Simon Bonetti (born 10 January 1977) is an Australian former professional rugby league footballer who played in the 1990s and 2000s. He played for the Sydney Roosters. His position was hooker, renowned for his tackling abilities and the fact he rarely scored a try.

== Playing career ==
Hailing from Griffith, New South Wales where his family farmed rice, Bonetti played six seasons with the Roosters and appeared in two premiership deciders for them: the loss to Brisbane in the 2000 NRL Grand Final and the win over the New Zealand Warriors in the 2002 NRL Grand Final. He retired from Rugby League after winning the 2002 Grand Final.

He was also eligible to represent the Italy national rugby league team.
