= Kerry Hemsley =

Australian rugby league footballer and coach

Personal information
- Born: 10 May 1960 (age 66) Junee, New South Wales, Australia

Playing information
- Height: 185 cm (6 ft 1 in)
- Weight: 103 kg (16 st 3 lb)
- Position: Prop
Club
Years	Team	Pld	T	G	FG	P
1980–88	Balmain Tigers	135	3	0	0	11
1982–83	Le Pontet XIII			0	0
1983–84	Wigan	13	2	0	0	8
	Total	148	5	0	0	19

Kerry Hemsley (born 10 May 1960) is an Australian former professional rugby league footballer who played in the 1970s and 1980s. He played for the Balmain Tigers in the New South Wales Rugby League (NSWRL) competition, primarily as a prop.

While playing for Yanco, Hemsley was selected to play for Riverina against the touring Great Britain side in 1979.

Hemsley was recommended to Balmain by his Yanco captain-coach and former Tiger, Keith Outten. Hemsley spent nine seasons at Balmain, earning himself a reputation as an enforcer on the field and he became a club and crowd favourite with his long hair and beard.

During the Australian off-seasons, Hemsley played in France for Le Pontet XIII in 1982–1983 and in England for Wigan in 1983–84. He became the first Balmain player to appear at Wembley Stadium in a cup final when Wigan met and were defeated by Widnes Vikings.

1988 was to be Hemsley's last season with Balmain. Having made the semi-finals in the previous 2 seasons, Hemsley was out of the team from round 3, with coach Warren Ryan preferring other players. He returned only for the semis, after the suspension of Steve Roach. He started at prop for the 24–12 loss to Canterbury in the grand final. Following his retirement he played a further 8 years of bush football with Yanco-Wamoon and Blayney.

== Sources ==
- Gary Lester, ed. (1983). The Sun Book of Rugby League – 1983. Sydney: John Fairfax Marketing. p. 12. ISBN 0-909558-83-3.
- Alan Whiticker & Glen Hudson (2007). The Encyclopedia of Rugby League Players. Wetherill Park, New South Wales: Gary Allen Pty Ltd. p. 232. ISBN 978-1-877082-93-1.
