= Geoff Foster (rugby league) =

Australian rugby league footballer

Personal information
- Full name: Geoffrey Foster
- Born: 1 May 1952 (age 73) Griffith, New South Wales, Australia

Playing information
- Position: Lock, Second-row, Hooker
Club
Years	Team	Pld	T	G	FG	P
1972–78	Western Suburbs	105	28	0	1	85
Representative
Years	Team	Pld	T	G	FG	P
1979	NSW Country	1	0	0	0	0
- Source: As of 8 July 2019

Geoff Foster (born 1 May 1952) is an Australian former rugby league footballer who played in the 1970s. He played for Western Suburbs in the New South Wales Rugby League (NSWRL) competition.

== Playing career ==
After trials with Manly-Warringah and Canterbury-Bankstown, Foster joined Western Suburbs and made his first grade debut in 1972. In 1974, Foster was part of the Wests side which made it to the preliminary final until they were defeated by Eastern Suburbs 25–2 at the Sydney Cricket Ground.

In 1978, Foster was part of the Western Suburbs side which won the minor premiership under new coach Roy Masters who turned Wests from also-rans to a competitive force.

Foster played in both of Western Suburbs finals games which were a 14–10 defeat against Cronulla-Sutherland and the 14-7 preliminary final defeat against rivals Manly-Warringah. The loss to Manly would also be Foster's final game and he left the club at the end of 1978. In 1979, Foster was selected to represent New South Wales Country.

Foster then went on to play for Darlington Point-Coleambally in the Group 20 Rugby League competition, where he won the 1980 and 1983 premierships.
