= Chris Marland =

Australian rugby league player

Personal information
- Full name: Chris Marland
- Born: 7 July 1972 (age 52); Sydney, New South Wales, Australia

Playing information
- Position: Five-eighth, Halfback
Club
Years	Team	Pld	T	G	FG	P
1999	Western Suburbs Magpies	5	1	0	0	4

Chris Marland (born 7 July 1972) is an Australian former professional rugby league footballer who played in the 1990s. He played for the Western Suburbs Magpies. His position of choice was halfback.

== Playing career ==
Marland was graded by the now defunct Western Suburbs Magpies in 1997. He made his first grade debut from the bench in his side's final ever win, a 18−12 victory over the Balmain Tigers at Campbelltown Stadium in round 14 of the 1999 season. His final game of first grade came in the Magpies' 48−32 loss to the Manly Sea Eagles at Brookvale Oval in round 19 of the 1999 season. The Magpies finished the season with the wooden spoon and folded at the end of the season.

Marland was left out of the side for the Magpies' final ever first grade game against the Auckland Warriors at Campbelltown Stadium. Wests controversially merged with rivals the Balmain Tigers to form the Wests Tigers as part of the NRL's rationalization strategy. Marland was not offered a contract to play with the newly formed team for the 2000 NRL season and subsequently never played first grade rugby league again.
