= Aaron Wheatley =

Australian rugby league footballer

Personal information
- Born: 15 October 1981 (age 45) West Wyalong, New South Wales, Australia

Playing information
- Height: 1.84 m (6 ft 0 in)
- Weight: 100 kg (15 st 10 lb)
- Position: Second-row
Club
Years	Team	Pld	T	G	FG	P
2004	St. George Illawarra	5	0	0	0	0
2007	Canterbury-Bankstown	2	0	0	0	0
	Total	7	0	0	0	0

Aaron Wheatley is an Australian former professional rugby league footballer who played in the 2000s for Canterbury-Bankstown and St George Illawarra.

== Early life ==
Wheatley began playing junior rugby league with West Wyalong Mallee Men. Wheatley played in the second-row.

== Playing career ==
Wheatley played for Canterbury in 2007. Wheatley had previously played for St George in 2004.
