= Outen =

Outen is a surname. Notable people include:

- Alby Outen (1902–1972), Australian rules footballer
- Chink Outen (1905–1961), American baseball player
- Denise van Outen (born 1974), British actress, TV presenter, and singer
- Sarah Outen (born 1985), British athlete and adventurer
- Savannah Outen
