= Group 17 Rugby League =

Rugby league competition

Western Riverina Community Cup
- Sport: Rugby league
- Formerly known as: Group 17 Rugby League
- Instituted: 1935
- Inaugural season: 1959
- Ceased: 2006
- Re-formed: 2018
- Number of teams: 6
- Country: Australia
- Premiers: Goolgowi (2026)
- Most titles: Hay Magpies (12 titles)
- Website: Western Riverina Community Cup; Proten Community Cup Rugby League on facebook

Group 17 is a rugby league competition based in the Riverina and Central West regions of New South Wales, Australia. The competition collapsed in 2006 and reformed in 2018 as the Western Riverina Community Cup with six teams. It is currently sponsored by a chicken farm company called Proten, which has been the competition's sponsor since 2018.

The season runs from mid-May to late July, and features a knockout, six regular-season rounds, and a three-week finals series culminating in the Grand Final, which is hosted by a different team each year.

== History ==
=== Early history ===
Group 17 was formed in 1929 and originally centred around Griffith and Leeton, but with the pressures of the war mounting, Group 17 made the difficult decision to cancel its official competition in 1942 during World War II. However, when rugby league returned to normal competition after the war, Leeton, along with Griffith, Yenda, Yanco and others, joined the Wagga Wagga competition, Group 20. Group 20 later became the Griffith and District competition after the Wagga clubs joined Group 9.

Rugby league in the Western Riverina district began as an inter-town competition between Hillston, Merriwagga, Goolgowi and Hay. The competition was suspended during World War 2.

It reformed in 1947 as the 'Western Zone' with teams from Hay, Darlington Point, Goolgowi, Carrathool and two teams from Hillston, 'Town' and 'Country'. Tullibigeal joined during the 1950s, and won the 1965 Clayton Cup, the Country Rugby League's highest honour, but later departed to form the TLU Sharks with Lake Cargelligo in Group 20. In 1959, the league became known as Group 17, and featured two zones, with Zone 1 being centred around Hillston and Zone 2 around Hay.

=== 1968 Clayton Cup "Final" ===
After both Euabalong and Darlington Point finished the 1968 season undefeated in Zones 1 and 2 respectively, and were left as the only two undefeated teams in the state, administrators were unsure of which side were more deserving of the coveted Clayton Cup as the best team in the Country Rugby League. The idea of settling who was the best overall Group 17 side had been resolved with a playoff match in the past, such as when Zone 1 side Tullibigeal defeated Hay (Zone 2) in 1967. Thus, a playoff final to determine the overall Group 17 Premier, and also the Clayton Cup winner, was set down for the 29th of September 1968 at Goolgowi.

29 September 1968
15:00 AEST (UTC+10:00)

Darlington Point	20–0	Euabalong Tigers

Goolgowi Recreation Ground
Attendance: 700
Referee: William "Bill" O'Brien (Weethalle)

In a one-way encounter, the Darlington Point Red & Blacks completed a 20-0 shutout of the Euabalong Tigers side, were awarded the Clayton Cup, and settled the annual dispute over which of the two zones was stronger. The match remains the only one of its kind to this day, which is significant given that the Clayton Cup has been awarded annually since 1937, and various other tiebreakers have been used on every other occasion two teams finish with identical records as the best team in the state.

Darlington Point were considered too strong for the competition after the result and joined Group 20 the following year in 1969. In around 1969-70 the two Group 17 "Zones" merged to form a single competition.

=== 1970s–2006 ===
The Deniliquin Blue Heelers were the dominant force in the early 1970s, winning three consecutive premierships from 1969 to 1971, before folding in 1975. Coleambally also left in 1972 and merged with Darlington Point to form a combined club in Group 20 known as the DPC Roosters. Tullibigeal and Lake Cargelligo also merged to form a combined side known as Tullibigeal-Lakes United, with the new club joining Group 20 in 1972.

Throughout the 1980s and 1990s, the competition sustained a decent standard, with eight clubs participating. More Clayton Cups were won by Group 17 clubs, with Rankins Springs (1993), Barellan (1999 and 2002) and Hillston (2006) all claiming the trophy. But by the 2000s, the Millennial Drought had caused many of the teams to be weakened, due to farming, the primary industry in the region, becoming not only unprofitable, but almost impossible. The competition collapsed after the 2006 season.

=== Western Riverina Community Cup Era (2018-present) ===
The competition was revived in 2018 as the Group 17 Western Riverina Community Cup, with six teams participating. The format involved a knockout and five rounds followed by semi-finals and a grand final. In each round, all three games were played at the same venue, similar to the NRL's Magic Round concept. The season increased to six games the following year, where it has remained. Deniliquin Blueheelers made a historic return to Group 17 for the first time in 48 Years, therefore increasing the season to 7 rounds, including a bye.

In the 2026 season, the Narrandera Lizards returned to Group 20.

== Clubs ==
Design	Club	Nickname	Years	Home Ground	No of Premierships	Premiership Years
	Barellan	Rams	1950s–2004, 2018–present	Barellan Sports Ground	10	1973–74, 1976, 1978, 1981, 1984, 1999, 2002–03, 2025
	Deniliquin	Blueheelers	1960s–1977, 2025–present	Rotary Park, Deniliquin	3	1969–71
	Goolgowi-Merriwagga	Rabbitohs	1955–2006, 2018–present	Goolgowi Recreation Ground	9	1965–66, 1977, 1985, 1992, 2004–05, 2019, 2026
	Hillston	Bluebirds	1955–2006, 2018–present	Stan Peters Oval, Hillston	8	1979–80, 1983, 1986–88, 1996, 2006
	Ivanhoe	Roosters	1950s–2004, 2018–present	Sahara Oval, Ivanhoe	0	None
	Rankins Springs	Dragons	1955–2006, 2018–present	Rankins Springs Recreation Ground	7	1962, 1993, 1997, 2000, 2018, 2021, 2024

=== Previous clubs ===
Past participants in the Group 17 competition included:

- Carrathool Grasshoppers (defunct)
- Coleambally Greens (Merged with Darlington Point and joined Group 20 in 1973)
- Darlington Point Red & Black (Joined Group 20 as the Roosters in 1969, merged with Coleambally in 1973) – Premierships: 3 (1963–64, 1968)
- Finley Tigers (Reserve Grade, Moved to Goulburn Murray Rugby League)
- Griffith Black and Whites (moved to Group 20 in 1954)
- Griffith Three Ways United (Now only play in NSW Koori Knockout)
- Hanwood Crushers/Warriors (defunct)
- **Hay Magpies (now in Group 20) – Premierships: 12 (1959–61, 1967, 1972, 1975, 1982, 1989–91, 1994–95)**
- Lake Cargelligo Sharks (Merged with Tullibigeal and joined Group 20)
- Leeton Greenies (Moved to Group 20 Rugby League in 1954) - Premierships: 3 (1939, 1941, 1948)
- Merriwagga Eagles (Merged into Goolgowi RLFC)
- Narrandera Lizards (Rejoined Group 20 Rugby League in 2026) - Premierships: 2 (2022, 2023)
- **Murrin Bridge-Euabalong Tigers (No longer compete in regular competition)**
- Tullibigeal (Merged with Lake Cargelligo and joined Group 20)
- Weethalle Kangaroos (defunct)
- Whitton Bulls (defunct) Premierships: 2 (1998, 2001)
- Yanco (merged with Wamoon, entered Group 20)

Bold indicates that the club fielded a team in the 2006 First-Grade competition.

== Grand Finals ==
Group 17 Zone 2 Grand Finals 1959-1972
Season	Premiers	Score	Runners-up	Coach	Report	Minor Premiers
1959	Hay Magpies		Ivanhoe Roosters			
1960	Hay Magpies		Darlington Point			
1961	Hay Magpies		Goolgowi Rabbitohs			
1962	Rankins Springs Dragons		Darlington Point			
1963	Darlington Point		Hay Magpies			
1964	Darlington Point		Hay Magpies			
1965	Goolgowi Rabbitohs		Rankins Springs Dragons			
1966	Goolgowi Rabbitohs	5–3	Hay Magpies			
1967	Hay Magpies	17–9	Coleambally			
1968	Darlington Point*	32–12	Hay Magpies	William "Bill" Watson		Darlington Point*
1969	Deniliquin Blue Heelers		Coleambally			
1970	Deniliquin Blue Heelers	26–14	Goolgowi Rabbitohs	Barry Cottam		
1971	Deniliquin Blue Heelers	26–14	Goolgowi Rabbitohs	Barry Cottam		
1972	Hay Magpies	26–9	Deniliquin Blue Heelers	B. Curtis		

Group 17 Grand Finals 1973–present
Season	Premiers	Score	Runners-up	Coach	Report	Minor Premiers
1973	Barellan Rams	41–2	Goolgowi Rabbitohs	R. Murdoch		
1974	Barellan Rams	27–8	Hay Magpies	R. Murdoch		
1975	Hay Magpies	25–11	Goolgowi Rabbitohs	M. Johnston		
1976	Barellan Rams	9–3	Goolgowi-Merriwagga Rabbitohs	Greg Smith		
1977	Goolgowi-Merriwagga Rabbitohs	23–19	Hay Magpies	Greg Byrnes		
1978	Barellan Rams	9–5	Hillston Bluebirds	J. Campbell		
1979	Hillston Bluebirds	16–10	Rankins Springs Dragons	G. Saddler		
1980	Hillston Bluebirds	27–19	Rankins Springs Dragons	John Sheridan		
1981	Barellan Rams	27–3	Hillston Bluebirds	P. O'Brien		
1982	Hay Magpies	23–15	Hillston Bluebirds	Kevin Goldspink		
1983	Hillston Bluebirds	38–36	Weethalle Kangaroos	Laurie Townsend	TAN	Hay Magpies
1984	Barellan Rams	14–2	Goolgowi Rabbitohs	Mick Trembath	TAN	Goolgowi Rabbitohs
1985	Goolgowi Rabbitohs	8–6	Hay Magpies	Mick Turner		Goolgowi Rabbitohs
1986	Hillston Bluebirds	16–5	Barellan Rams	Ray Schaefer		Hillston Bluebirds
1987	Hillston Bluebirds	34–29	Ivanhoe Roosters	Ray Schaefer		Hillston Bluebirds
1988	Hillston Bluebirds	18–6	Goolgowi-Merriwagga Rabbitohs	Ray Schaefer		Hay Magpies
1989	Hay Magpies	20–18	Goolgowi-Merriwagga Rabbitohs	Neil-John Nisbet		Hay Magpies
1990	Hay Magpies	26–14	Goolgowi-Merriwagga Rabbitohs	Neil-John Nisbet		Goolgowi Rabbitohs
1991	Hay Magpies	14–6	Hillston Bluebirds	Neil-John Nisbet		Hay Magpies
1992	Goolgowi Rabbitohs	14–0	Rankins Springs Dragons	John Barzan	TAN	Goolgowi Rabbitohs
1993	Rankins Springs Dragons*	34–16	Hay Magpies	Stuart Vearing	TAN	Rankins Springs Dragons
1994	Hay Magpies	27–18	Hillston Bluebirds	Chris Aylett	TAN YT	Ivanhoe Roosters
1995	Hay Magpies	38–10	Rankins Springs Dragons	Jack Byrnes	TAN YT	Barellan Rams
1996	Hillston Bluebirds	22–8	Whitton Bulls	John Townsend	TAN	Whitton Bulls
1997	Rankins Springs Dragons	50–10	Whitton Bulls	Steve Schmetzer	TAN	Rankins Springs Dragons
1998	Whitton Bulls	20–12	Barellan Rams	James Mason and Shane Bamblett	TAN	Whitton Bulls
1999	Barellan Rams*	38–22	Rankins Springs Dragons	John Waide		Barellan Rams
2000	Rankins Springs Dragons	34–20	Barellan Rams	Stuart Vearing	TAN	Barellan Rams
2001	Whitton Bulls	32–28	Rankins Springs Dragons	John Pannowitz (Co-coach)	TAN	Whitton Bulls
2002	Barellan Rams*	10–7	Whitton Bulls	Clint Halden	TAN	Barellan Rams
2003	Barellan Rams	22–2	Rankins Springs Dragons			Hay Magpies
2004	Goolgowi Rabbitohs	26–12	Barellan Rams	Greg Borger	TAN	Goolgowi Rabbitohs
2005	Goolgowi Rabbitohs	31–28	Hillston Bluebirds	Greg Borger	TAN	Goolgowi Rabbitohs
2006	Hillston Bluebirds*	32–0	Rankins Springs Dragons	Steve Parr		Hillston Bluebirds
2007–17 hiatus due to drought & not enough clubs
2018	Rankins Springs Dragons	16–10	Goolgowi Rabbitohs	Jamie Parsons & Joshua Curphey	YT TAN	Rankins Springs Dragons
2019	Goolgowi Rabbitohs	22–6	Narrandera Lizards	Alex Brown & John Michael Cahill	TAN	Goolgowi Rabbitohs
2020 season cancelled due to COVID-19 pandemic
2021	Rankins Springs Dragons	10–8	Goolgowi Rabbitohs	Jamie Parsons & John Power		Goolgowi Rabbitohs
2022	Narrandera Lizards	20–14	Ivanhoe Roosters	Kye Longford	BFBF RG	Ivanhoe Roosters
2023	Narrandera Lizards	20–14	Ivanhoe Roosters	Kye Longford	BFBF	Narrandera Lizards
2024	Rankins Springs Dragons	20–18	Narrandera Lizards	Damian Walker & Josh Johnston	BFBF	Narrandera Lizards
2025	Barellan Rams	22–20	Ivanhoe Roosters	Noah Forbutt & Adam Thomas	BFBF	Barellan Rams
2026	Goolgowi Rabbitohs	20–6	Ivanhoe Roosters	Sam Taylor, Tom Condon & Ben Marks	BFBF	Goolgowi Rabbitohs

The use of (*) indicates that the premiers for that season won the Clayton Cup as the premier team in NSWCRL competitions statewide (regionally, excludes Sydney) for that year.

== Women's Nines Grand Finals ==
Group 17 Women's Nines Grand Finals 2022–present
Season	Premiers	Score	Runners-up	Coach	Report	Minor Premiers
2022	Narrandera Lizards	16–0	Goolgowi Rabbitohs	Owen Jones	BFBF RG	Narrandera Lizards
2023	Barellan Rams	16–14	Ivanhoe Roosters	Sam Everett	BFBF	Barellan Rams
2024	Barellan Rams	26–6	Ivanhoe Roosters	Brittany Everett	BFBF	Barellan Rams
2025	Barellan Rams	26–2	Ivanhoe Roosters	Craig Toole	BFBF	Barellan Rams
2026	Rankins Springs Dragons	4–0	Ivanhoe Roosters	Luke Tuckett & Brooke Streat	BFBF	Ivanhoe Roosters

== Reserve Grade Premiers ==
Group 17 Reserve Grade Premiers 1970-1994
Season	Premiers	Score	Runners-up	Minor Premiers
1970	Hay Magpies		Hillston Bluebirds	
1971	Goolgowi Rabbitohs		Barellan Rams	
1972	Hay Magpies		Goolgowi Rabbitohs	
1973	Barellan Rams		Goolgowi Rabbitohs	
1974	Barellan Rams		Goolgowi Rabbitohs	
1975	Finley Tigers		Deniliquin Blue Heelers	
1976	Ivanhoe Roosters		Goolgowi Rabbitohs	
1977	Barellan Rams		Weethalle Kangaroos	
1978	Weethalle Kangaroos		Ivanhoe Roosters	
1979	Hillston Bluebirds		Barellan Rams	
1980	Hillston Bluebirds		Rankins Springs Dragons	
1981	Barellan Rams		Goolgowi Rabbitohs	
1982	Hillston Bluebirds		Goolgowi Rabbitohs	
1983	Hay Magpies		Barellan Rams	
1984	Hay Magpies		Goolgowi Rabbitohs	
1985	Hay Magpies		Goolgowi Rabbitohs	
1986	Goolgowi Rabbitohs		Barellan Rams	
1987	Barellan Rams		Rankins Springs Dragons	
1988	Goolgowi Rabbitohs		Barellan Rams	
1989	Goolgowi Rabbitohs		Hillston Bluebirds	
1990	Weethalle/Three Ways United		Rankins Springs Dragons	
1991	Rankins Springs Dragons		Weethalle Kangaroos	
1992	Goolgowi Rabbitohs		Hillston Bluebirds	
1993	Rankins Springs Dragons	10-6	Hay Magpies	
1994	Hillston Bluebirds	32-8	Barellan Rams	

== Group 17 Knockout - Ron Hunt Memorial Shield ==
Group 17 Knockout Winners 1974-1995
Season	Winner
1974	Barellan Rams
1975	Goolgowi Rabbitohs
1976	Goolgowi Rabbitohs
1977	Hay Magpies
1978	Barellan Rams
1979	Hillston Bluebirds
1980	Hillston Bluebirds
1981	Barellan Rams
1982	Euabalong Tigers
1983	Hay Magpies
1984	Barellan Rams
1985	Goolgowi Rabbitohs
1986	Barellan Rams
1987	Goolgowi Rabbitohs
1988	Hay Magpies
1989	Goolgowi Rabbitohs
1990	Rankins Springs Dragons
1991	Hay Magpies
1992	Goolgowi Rabbitohs
1993	Rankins Springs Dragons
1994	Hillston Bluebirds
1995	Rankins Springs Dragons

== Best and Fairest Winners ==
=== First Grade ===
First Grade - Riverine Grazier Medal
Season	Player	Club
1971	Ian Springali	Hay Magpies
1972	Geoff Langford	Barellan Rams
1973	Greg Byrnes	Goolgowi Rabbitohs
1973	Neil Scobie	Hay Magpies
1974	Mick O'Connor	Deniliquin Blue Heelers
1975	Ray Hardie	Hillston Bluebirds
1976	Gary Gray	Griffith Three Ways United
1977	Neil Scobie	Hay Magpies
1978	Mick Ireson	Hay Magpies
1979	Paul McCanna	Rankins Springs Dragons
1979	Jim Hanlon	Hillston Bluebirds
1980		
1981	Greg Reko	Hillston Bluebirds
1981	David Robertson	Rankins Springs Dragons
1982	Robert Matthews	Hay Magpies
1983	Michael Lewis	Weethalle Kangaroos
1983	Neil-John Nisbet	Hay Magpies
1984	Warren Butler	Barellan Rams
1985	Jim Vitucci	Goolgowi Rabbitohs
1985	Robert Matthews	Hay Magpies
1986	Ray Schaefer	Hillston Bluebirds
1987	Danny Byrnes	Hay Magpies
1988	Robert Matthews	Hay Magpies
1989	Wayne Dunbar	Hay Magpies
1989	Col Pickersgill	Rankins Springs Dragons
1990	Jim Vitucci	Goolgowi Rabbitohs
1991	John Woods	Hay Magpies
1992	Stuart Vearing	Rankins Springs Dragons
1992	Wayne Basham	Barellan Rams
1993	Paul Glyde	Rankins Springs Dragons
1994	Stuart Vearing	Rankins Springs Dragons
1995	Stuart Vearing	Rankins Springs Dragons
1995	Charlie Prince	Rankins Springs Dragons
1996		
1997		
1998		
1999		
2000		
2001		
2002		
2003		
2004		
2005		
2006		
Recess 2007-17
2018		
2019		
2020	Not Awarded - COVID-19	
2021		
2022		
2023	William Charles	Ivanhoe Roosters
2024	Oswald Herrmann	Barellan Rams

=== Women's 9s ===
Season	Player	Club
2022		
2023		
2024	Bobbi-Lee Goolagong	Ivanhoe Roosters

=== Reserve Grade ===
Reserve Grade - Referees' Association Medal
Season	Player	Club
1971	Ross Hulm	Goolgowi Rabbitohs
1972	Jock McRae	Hay Magpies
1973	David Coates	Goolgowi Rabbitohs
1974	Brian Peters	Deniliquin Blue Heelers
1975	Brian Peters	Deniliquin Blue Heelers
1976	Warren Clark	Hillston Bluebirds
1977	Leigh Heaslip	Weethalle Kangaroos
1978	Robert Clark	Ivanhoe Roosters
1979	Neil Baillie	Hillston Bluebirds
1980	David Robertson	Rankins Springs Dragons
1981	Max Hutchison	Hillston Bluebirds
1982	Lionel Garner	Hay Magpies
1983	Lester Apps	Hillston Bluebirds
1984	Rob Christian	Rankins Springs Dragons
1985		
1986	David Beazley	Goolgowi Rabbitohs
1987	Geordie Groat	Rankins Springs Dragons
1988	Ian Sherer	Hay Magpies
1988	Wayne Kennedy	Hillston Bluebirds
1989	Wayne Parsons	Rankins Springs Dragons
1990	Wayne Parsons	Rankins Springs Dragons
1991	Glenn Judd	Weethalle Kangaroos
1992	Jamie Ziebath	Goolgowi Rabbitohs
1993	Paul Lamont	Rankins Springs Dragons
1993	Wayne Dunbar	Hay Magpies
1994	Troy Kennedy	Hillston Bluebirds
1995	Colin Thorpe	Euabalong Tigers

== Sources ==
Years	Item	Via
1959–70	Post: 19/07/2022	Proten Community Cup Facebook
1967–69, 1971–96	Country Rugby League Annual Report	State Library of NSW
1970 to 1995	1995 Carlton Group 17 Grand Final Program	Hard Copy
1983 to 2005	The Area News	Microfilm copies at State Library of NSW
2003 to 2006	Rugby League Week	Bound copies at State Library of NSW
2003 to 2006	Rugby League Week	eResources at State Library of NSW
2018 to 2019	Various Newspaper Websites	As referenced
2022	Battlers For Bush Footy	Website
2022	The Riverine Grazier	Website

== See also ==
- Group 20 Rugby League
- Northern Riverina Football League
