= Darlington Point =

- Town
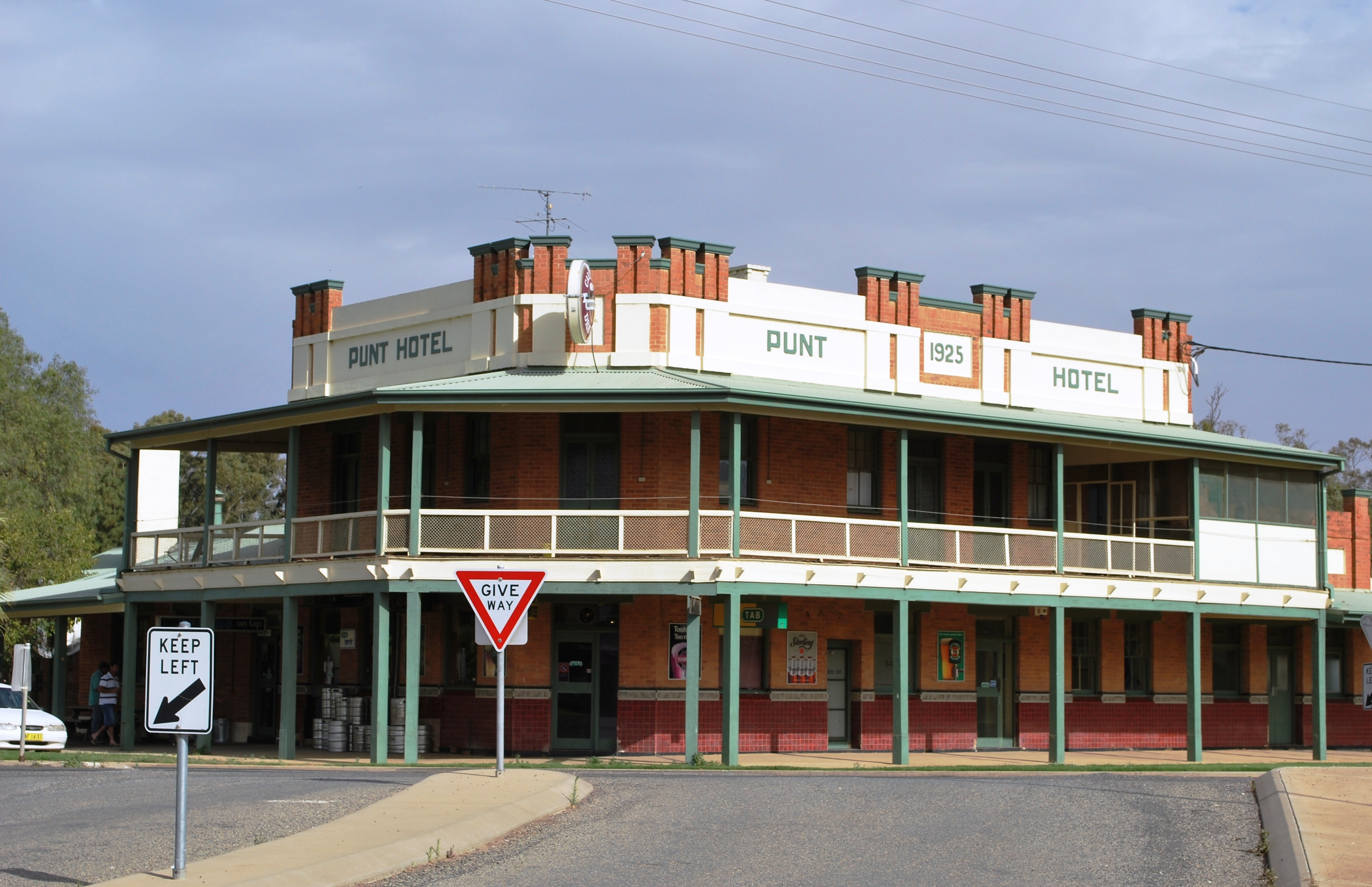
- The Punt Hotel

- Coordinates: 34°34′S 146°00′E
- Country: Australia
- State: New South Wales
- LGA: Murrumbidgee Council
- Location: 631 km (392 mi) SW of Sydney; 33 km (21 mi) SE of Griffith; 152 km (94 mi) NW of Wagga Wagga; 397 km (247 mi) W of Canberra; 422 km (262 mi) N of Melbourne

Government
  - State electorate: Murray
  - Federal division: Farrer

Population
  - Total: 1,030 (2021 census)
- Postcode: 2706
- County: Cooper

Darlington Point is a small town on the banks of the Murrumbidgee River in the central Riverina district of western New South Wales, Australia. It is part of the Murrumbidgee Council local government area. The centre of town is four kilometres from the Sturt Highway, along Kidman Way. Darlington Point is 631 kilometres (392 mi) south-west of Sydney and 33 kilometres (21 mi) south of Griffith. At the 2021 census, Darlington Point had a population of 1,030.

== History ==
=== Pastoral runs ===
The first pastoral run near present-day Darlington Point, on the north bank of the Murrumbidgee, was taken up in 1844 by John Peter; he named the run "Cuba" after the Aboriginal word for a locally-common Acacia tree. On the south bank, John Peter also leased the "Tubbo" run, a property he had formed in the 1850s by the amalgamation of several runs. The site where the township later developed was a crossing-place over the Murrumbidgee River used by stockmen and teamsters. The Surveyor Townshend laid out reserves near the crossing-place during the 1850s.

=== Darlington Point and Waddai ===
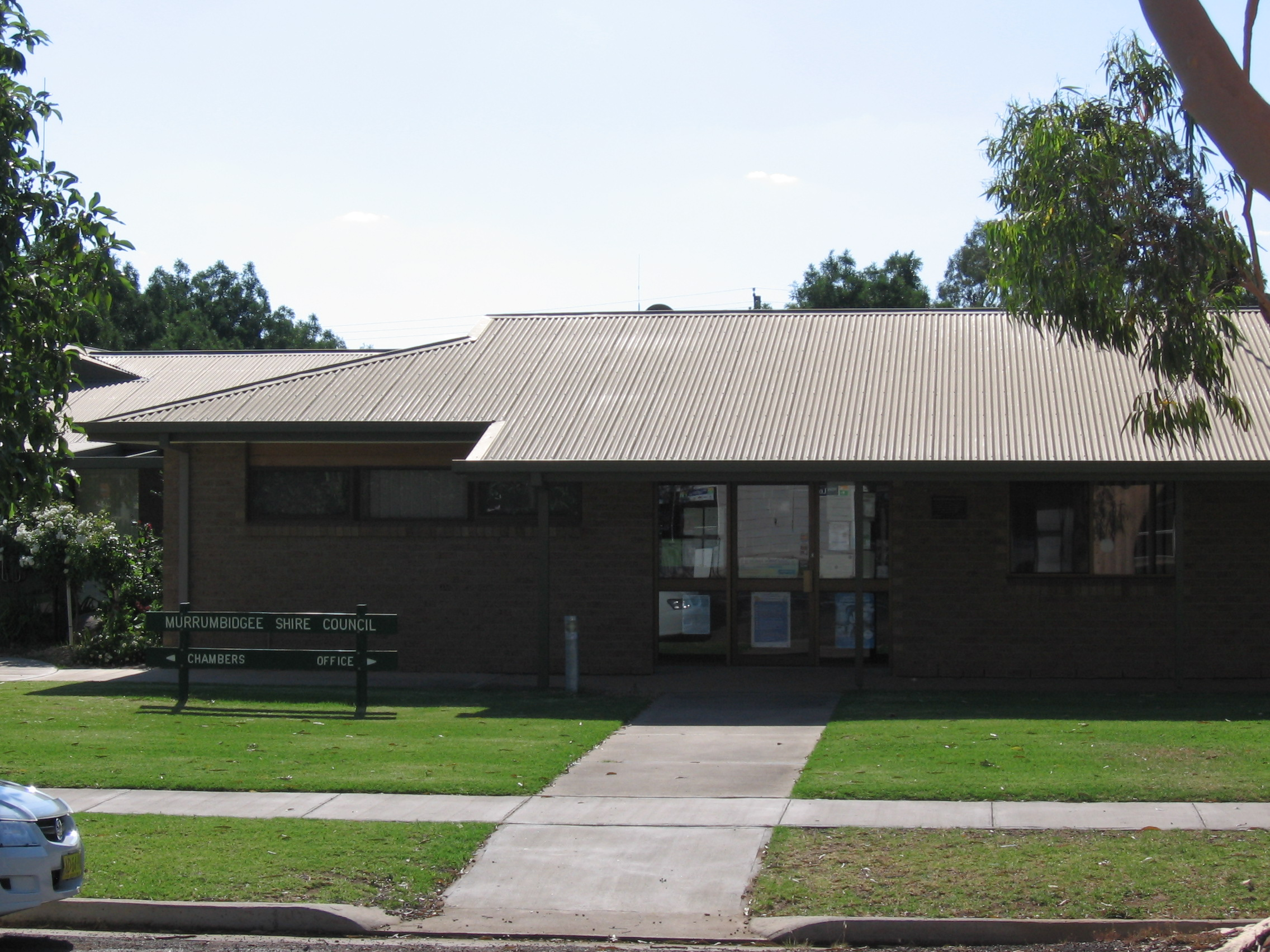
Darlington Point branch office of Murrumbidgee Council

In 1864 George Rogers acquired 56 acres (22.7 ha) of "Cuba" station. He built the Darlington Inn about two miles (3 km) west of "Cuba" homestead at the junction of the Wagga Wagga to Hay road and the track leading to the river-crossing. Rogers soon became discontented; he sold out a year later and left the district. The new publican of the Darlington Inn was Jacob Abrahams. Another hotel (probably the Waddai Hotel) was built on the southern bank at the crossing (eventually leading to the development of the Waddai township). A report published in August 1865 claimed that Darlington Point, by "the growth of free selection", was "fast assuming the dimensions and appearance of a township"; there were two hotels, one on either side of the river, which the writer concluded "can hardly be regarded as a favourable sign".

In 1866 a punt (previously operating at Wagga Wagga) was purchased for use at the Darlington Point-Waddai crossing; the owner of the punt was Jacob Abrahams, previously publican of the Darlington Inn, who had opened a general store at the township. The punt was said to be one of the largest in the colony, with the capacity to carry 1,700 sheep in a single trip. The licence of the Darlington Inn was held by Thomas Linsell from 1866 to 1868. Edward J. Flood held the licence of the Darlington Inn in 1869 (the last year this hotel appears in the annual list of licences granted).

In about 1870 a second hotel was built on the southern bank at Waddai; for the year commencing 1 July 1870 Edward Grimley held the licence there for the Riverina Hotel. From mid-1871 Alexander Beaumont held the licence of the Waddai Hotel. The licences for the year commencing 1 July 1872 at both settlements were: Coach and Horses Hotel at Darlington Point (Keyran C. H. Cumming); Waddai Hotel (John White) and Riverine Hotel (Edward Grimley), both at Waddai. At Darlington Point by this stage the Coach and Horses Hotel had apparently replaced the Darlington Inn (possibly just a name-change). Keyran C. H. Cumming remained the licensee of the Coach and Horses Hotel at Darlington Point from 1871 to early 1879 (after which John Bowman held the licence). The licences for the two hotels at Waddai were held by a number of different persons over this same period.

In 1876 the steamer company McCulloch and Co. leased 5 acres (2.0 ha) on the river where they established a wool receiving store, a general store and erected a small wharf. By 1880 the timber trade was booming with a high demand for railway timber; G. H. Risbey from Narrandera erected a small mill near Darlington Point to cut red-gum. Darlington Point Post Office opened on 1 November 1876.

Darlington Point township was half a mile from the punt where, on the opposite bank, the southern township – "called by the native name 'Wadai'" – was located. In April 1881 it was reported that "Darlington and Wadai collectively contain a population of about 120". The adjoining townships had three hotels, three stores, "and the usual concomitants of a bush town".

From 1881 onwards it appears the Punt Hotel replaced the Riverine Hotel at Waddai (possibly a name-change of the existing hotel). The licences at both townships for the year commencing 1 July 1881 were: Coach and Horses Hotel at Darlington Point (John Bowman); Waddai Hotel (William Whyte) and Punt Hotel (James Slattery), both at Waddai.

In 1882 a public school was opened with Mrs. J. Carroll in charge. In June 1882 it was reported that a move had been instigated to have the Government buildings removed to the south side of the river. By 1883 a post-office, courthouse, police barracks, school and telegraph service had been established at the township.

As the town centre became established in the southern township the name 'Darlington Point' was eventually used for the settlements on both banks of the river. The town's main street is called Punt Road, a reminder of the public transport service that operated to ferry vehicles, stock and passengers across the river. The place-name of 'Waddai' seems to have been transferred; the small cluster of buildings at the junction of Kidman Way and the Sturt Highway became known as Waddi.

A lift bridge was built in 1905, joining the communities on either side of the river. The structure was replaced in 1979 by a concrete bridge. Part of the old bridge was reconstructed for the Australian Bicentenary celebrations and can now be found at the entrance to the Darlington Point Riverside Caravan Park which is located on a bend along the banks of the Murrumbidgee River.

=== Warangesda Mission ===
For more information, see Warangesda Aboriginal Mission

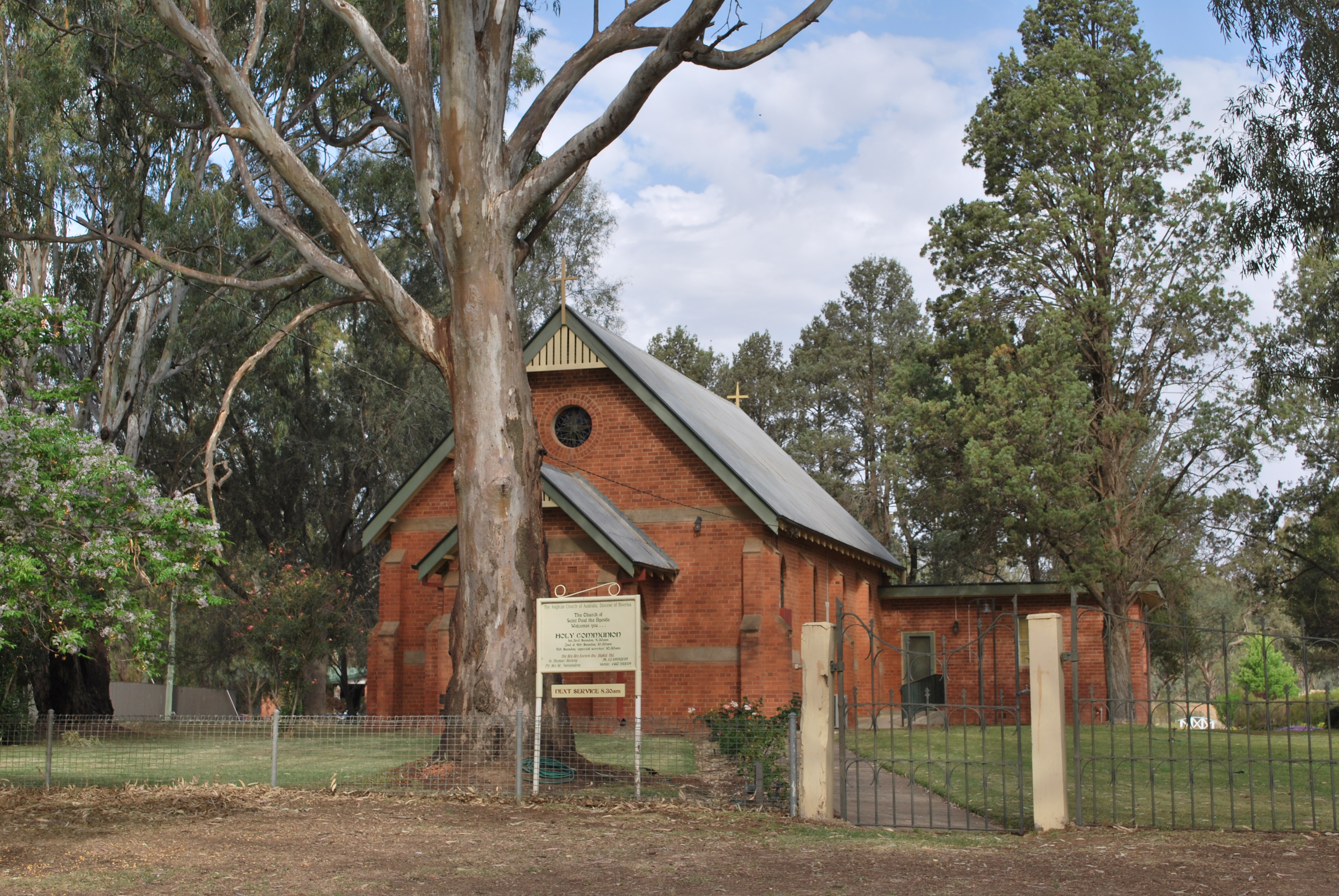
St. Paul's Anglican Church where the Warangesda mission bell hangs.

In 1880 the Rev. John Brown Gribble, a Congregational, later Anglican, minister, established an Aboriginal mission on "Warangesda" station, 3 kilometres (1.9 mi) from Waddai township (near the crossing-place on the south bank). The New South Wales Government granted a reserve of 600 acres (243 ha) for the purpose, which became known as the Camp of Mercy.

The annual report of the Aborigines Protection Board for 1911 in regard to the mission reported "a quiet and uneventful year, though five convictions had been obtained for the supply of liquor to the Aborigines". As of 31 December 1911 there were 151 residents on the station, comprising "full-bloods: 26 adults and 5 children" and "half-castes: 73 adults and 47 children". The area of land under cultivation was 100 acres (40.5 ha), mostly of wheat but also including 5 acres (2.0 ha) of barley. The yield included a quantity of hay and 40 bags of wheat.

The Warangesda mission was closed by the Aborigines Protection Board in 1924 and the Aboriginal residents were moved to the 'police paddock', a plot of land behind the police station. The remains of an adobe building from this time can be seen in a paddock on "Warangesda" station (between Darlington Point township and the Sturt Highway). The mission bell now hangs in St Paul's Anglican Church in town.

== Toganmain woolshed ==
The woolshed at nearby Toganmain is Australia's largest woolshed, at 93 m (305 ft) in length and 46 m (151 ft) wide. It holds the Australian record for having had more than 202,000 sheep, by 92 blade shearers, shorn within its walls within a month, and has seen more than seven million sheep shorn in total. Poet Banjo Paterson wrote about it in his poem "Flash Jack from Gundagai", later transformed into a song by The Bushwhackers. In January 1999 the woolshed was listed on the New South Wales State Heritage Register.

== Today ==
Darlington Point contains a small shopping precinct, a swimming pool, two churches, a hotel, a club and a school. The town has a population of over 1000, with the majority living on the southern side of the river.

=== Sport ===
Sporting activities include bowling and tennis, as well as being represented by the Darlington Point-Coleambally Roosters in the Group 20 Rugby League competition.

==== Darlington Point-Coleambally Roosters ====
The Darlington Point-Coleambally Roosters compete in the Group 20 Rugby League competition, and were founded via a merger between Darlington Point and the Coleambally Greens in 1973. The club has won 5 First Grade Premierships, in 1980, 1983, 1987, 1988 and 2019.

Prior to the merger Darlington Point played in the Group 17 Rugby League competition. In 1968 they won the Clayton Cup as the best team in the Country Rugby League.

Leagues

- Darlington Point Red & Black
  - 1940s-1968 - Group 17 Rugby League
  - 1969-1972 - Group 20 Rugby League
- Darlington Point-Coleambally Roosters
  - 1973-present: Group 20 Rugby League

Premierships

- Darlington Point-Coleambally Roosters
  - First Grade: 1963, 1964, 1968
- Darlington Point-Coleambally Roosters
  - First Grade: 1980, 1983, 1987, 1988, 2019
  - Reserve Grade: 2008, 2019
  - Under 18s: 1987
  - Under 16s: 1981, 2011, 2013, 2014

=== Solar Farm ===
The Darlington Point Solar Farm is located approximately 10 km south of the town. It was commissioned in 2020 and is capable of generating 333MW (DC) or 275MW (AC).

== Heritage listings ==
Darlington Point has a number of heritage-listed sites, including:

- Warangesda Aboriginal Mission
