= Keith Outten =

Australian rugby league footballer

Personal information
- Full name: Keith Phillip Outten
- Born: 25 May 1947 Sydney, New South Wales, Australia
- Died: 26 October 2022 (aged 75) Croydon, New South Wales, Australia

Playing information
- Position: Five-eighth, Halfback
Club
Years	Team	Pld	T	G	FG	P
1968–71	Balmain Tigers	72	14	2	3	52
1972–74	North Sydney Bears	52	4	1	0	14
1975	Balmain Tigers	9	0	0	0	0
	Total	133	18	3	3	66

Keith Outten (1947−2022) was an Australian rugby league footballer who played in the 1960s and 1970s.

== Playing career ==
A five-eighth, Outten played four seasons with Balmain between 1968 and 1971. During this period, he won a premiership with the Tigers when he played five-eighth in the 1969 Grand Final.

Outten made a successful shift to the North Sydney Bears for three seasons between 1972 and 1974, before returning to Balmain for one final season in 1975. He captain-coached the rural club Yanco before retiring as a player. He died on 26 October 2022 following a long illness at the age of 75
