= Group 9 Rugby League =

Australian rugby league competition

- Sport: Rugby league
- Instituted: 27 April 1923; 103 years ago
- Inaugural season: 1923
- Number of teams: 10
- Country: Australia
- Premiers: Gundagai Tigers (2026)
- Most titles: Wagga Kangaroos (12 titles)
- Website: Group 9 at Play Rugby League

Group 9 is a rugby league competition based in Wagga Wagga, New South Wales, Australia, and surrounding areas. The competition is played in five grades, with these being Under 18s, Women's Tackle, Women's League-Tag, Reserve-Grade and First-Grade.

Currently a home and away season consisting of sixteen rounds is played. The best four teams then play-off according to the Page–McIntyre system, culminating in the Group 9 Grand final, which is traditionally held at Geohex Park at the Equex Centre in Wagga Wagga.

== History ==
=== 1920s–1950s: Foundations ===
Group 9 Rugby League was formed at a meeting at the Grand Hotel, Harden, following a four-hour meeting on 26 April 1923, which finished at 12:20 am the following morning. The foundation clubs were Harden, Murrumburrah, Binalong, Young, Wambanumba, Monteagle, Bendick Murrell, Cootamundra, Junee, Wagga Wagga, Gundagai, Tumut, Adelong, West Wyalong, Barmedman, Griffith, Temora, Leeton, Ariah Park and Mildil.

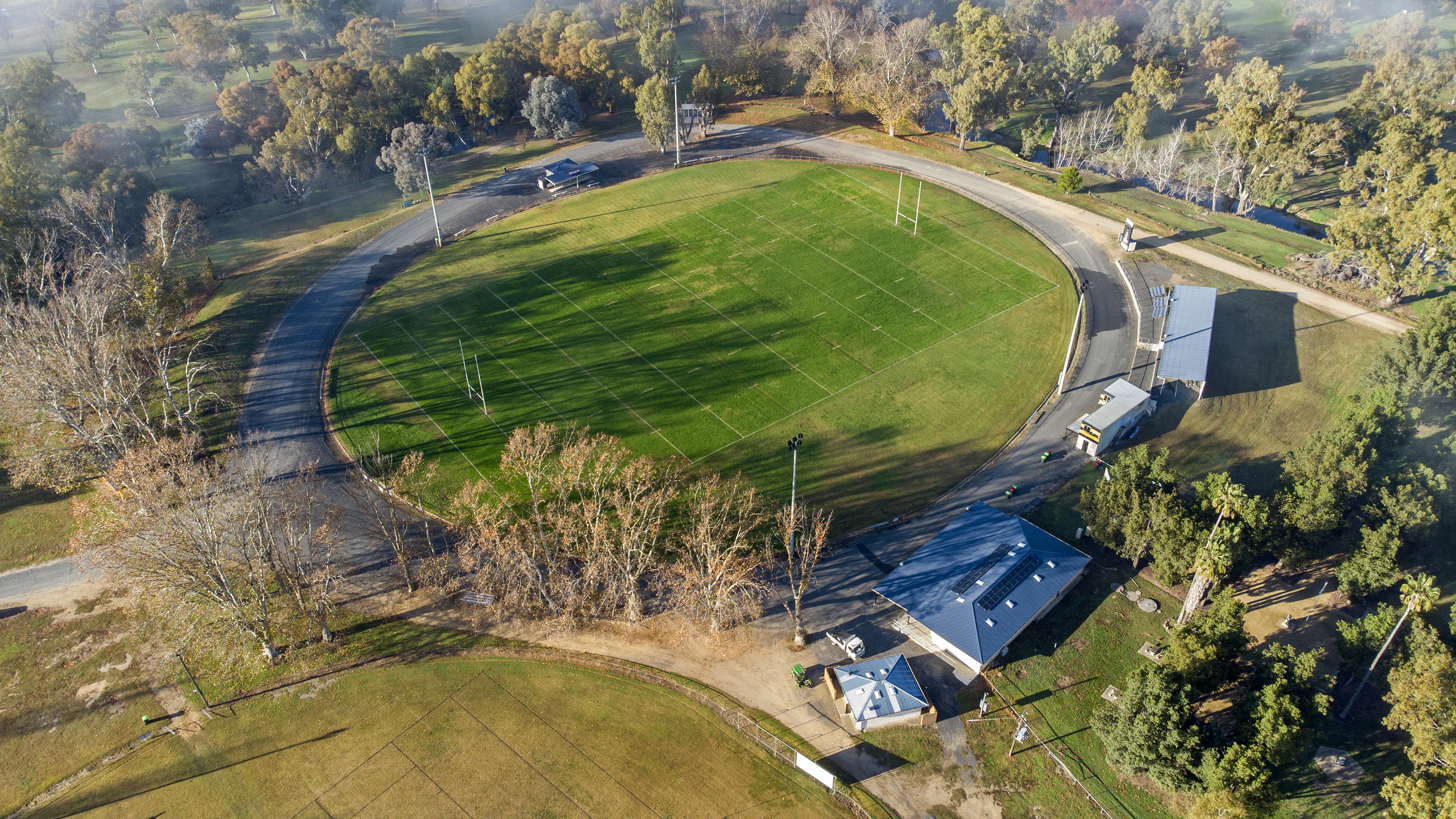
Aerial view of Anzac Park Oval in Gundagai

Competition in the early years of Group 9 consisted of various challenge type matches, and it was not until 1933 that regular inter-club competition commenced.

=== 1960s–1980s: Murrumbidgee Breakaway and Reformation ===
In 1966, the rebel Murrumbidgee Rugby League broke away from the competition due to years of competition boundary disputes, leading to four years of reshuffled competitions from 1967 to 1970. The Murrumbidgee Rugby League was renamed to Riverina Zone 3 in 1969-70.

Given that a number of the Group 9 clubs (including Gundagai, Junee, Tumut) joined the five clubs who broke away from Group 20 to form the new competition (Batlow, Tumbarumba, Turvey Park, Wagga Magpies and Wagga Kangaroos), Group 9 was severely weakened in the 1966 season.

Therefore, the remaining Group 9 clubs were divided up and put into neighbouring competitions. Barmedman, Temora and West Wyalong joined the Group 20 during this period, leading to the 9/20 name, while Harden, Young and Wyangala Dam joined Group 8. To honour the additions of the clubs, the competitions were renamed to Group 9/20, Group 8/9 respectively.

In 1970, when the Group 9 body regained control of football in the district and the Murrumbidgee Rugby League/Riverina Zone 3 returned to the competition, West Wyalong remained in Group 20, while Harden, Temora and Young returned from their respective competitions.

=== 1990s–present: Absorption of Group 13, Peak and Decline ===
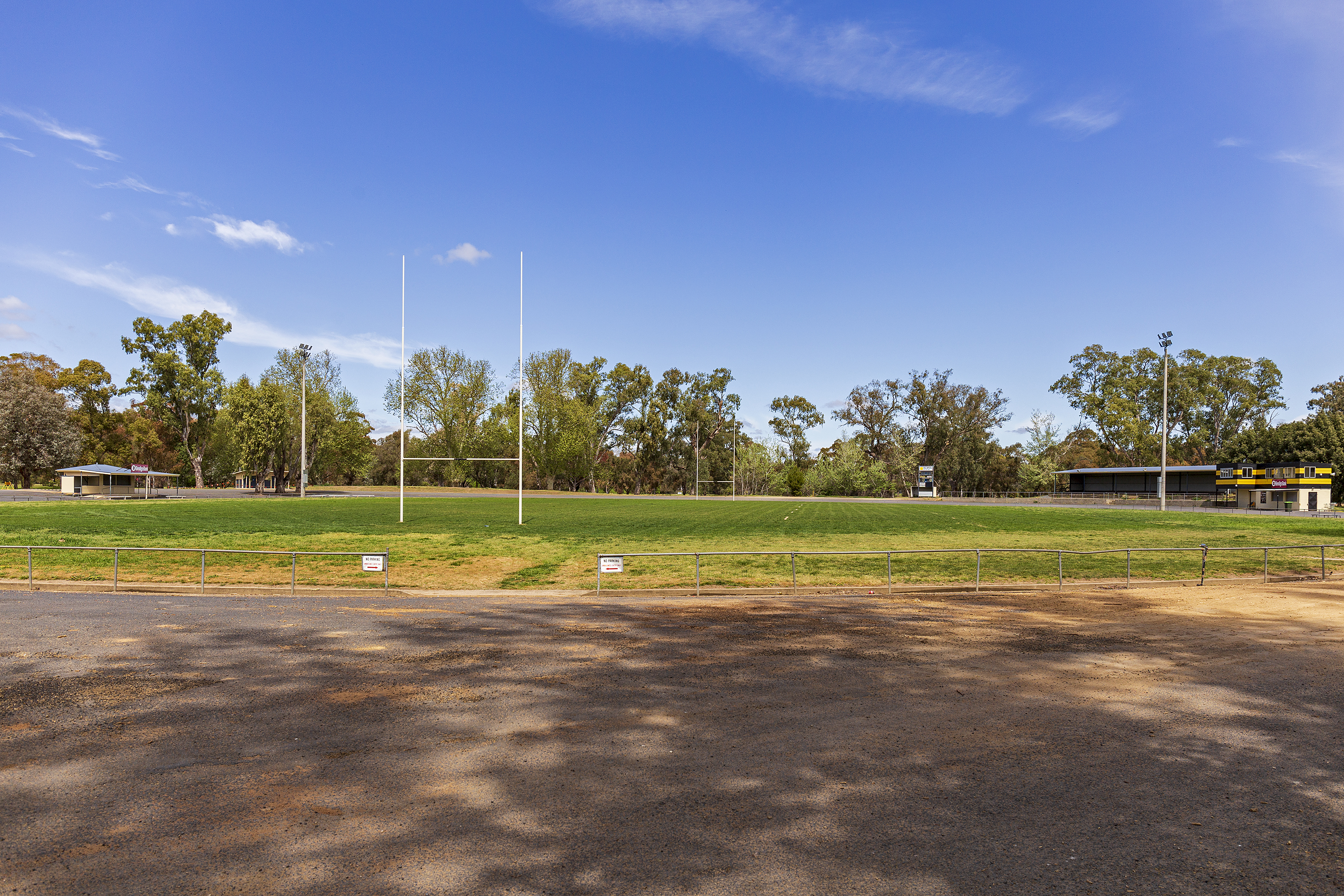
Anzac Park Oval, Gundagai

After the Group 13 Rugby League competition collapsed in 1991, the Albury Blues (renamed Albury Rams upon entry due to Tumut already being the Blues), Wagga Brothers, a merged outfit from Adelong and Batlow formed The Adelong-Batlow Bears, and Tumbarumba Greenies, joined the competition.

However, the competition declined from a peak of 14 clubs in the late 1990s to 9 clubs in 2022. Clubs to leave in this period included Adelong-Batlow (folded), Harden-Murrumburrah (George Tooke Shield), Tumbarumba (folded, then joined Murray Cup) and Cootamundra (George Tooke Shield). Turvey Park and Wagga Magpies also merged in 2005 to form the South City Bulls.

Albury Thunder, the successor to Albury Blues, Albury Rams and Lavington Panthers, won a threepeat of titles from 2012 to 2014.

Group 9's crisis became even more apparent following powerhouse Junee's decision not to field a First Grade team in 2021 and 2022. However, this strategy paid off as the club won the Reserve Grade title in 2022, with plans to return to First Grade football in 2023. Their return to the premier grade was offset by the loss of the Wagga Brothers to the exact same fate for the 2023 season.

Brothers returned to first grade in 2024, while Cootamundra also re-joined the competition in 2025, winning the Under 18s premiership in that season.

== Current clubs ==
Town	Nickname	Home ground	Years	Titles	Premiership Years
Albury	Thunder	Greenfield Park, Albury	1992–	3	2012–14
Cootamundra	Bulldogs	Les Boyd Oval	1923–2019; 2025–	9	1947–48, 1950–51, 1954, 1982, 1988, 1990, 2005
Gundagai	Tigers	ANZAC Park, Gundagai	1923–	9	1946, 1963, 1983, 2015, 2018, 2020, 2022, 2025, 2026
Junee	Diesels	Laurie Daley Oval, Junee	1923–	2	1964, 1986
South City	Bulls	Harris Park, Wagga Wagga	2005–	3	2011, 2016–17
Temora	Dragons	Nixon Park, Temora	1923–	9	1957–59, 1961, 1977, 1998, 2002, 2004, 2006
Tumut	Blues	Twickenham, Tumut	1923–	10	1940, 1949, 1970, 1973, 2003, 2007–08, 2010, 2019, 2023
Wagga Wagga	Brothers	Geohex Park, Wagga Wagga	1980; 1993–	1	1995
Wagga Wagga	Kangaroos	Geohex Park, Wagga Wagga	1967–1991; 1993–	12	1968–69, 1971, 1978–79, 1985, 1987, 1994, 1999-2000-01, 2009
Young	Cherrypickers	Alfred Oval, Young	1923–	10	1941, 1952–53, 1955–56, 1968, 1974, 1984, 1991, 2024

== Previous clubs ==
=== Post-1966 Schism ===
Club	Nickname	No. of Premierships	Premiership Years	Notes
Adelong-Batlow	Bears	1	1996	Merger of Adelong and Batlow following the demise of Group 13, disbanded early 2000s
Barmedman	Clydesdales	0	None	Moved to Group 20 in 1967, then moved to Group 9 Second Division in 1972
Cowra	Magpies	1	1939	Moved to Group 10 in 1955
Grenfell	Goannas	0	None	Moved to Group 9 Second Division in 1972
Harden-Murrumburrah	Hawks	2	1962, 1981	Amalgamated with Binalong to form South West Brahmans in the George Tooke Shield. The clubs have separated and each field teams in the Shield
Turvey Park	Lions	4	1972, 1975–76, 1993	Amalgamated with Wagga Magpies to form South City Bulls in 2005
Tumbarumba	Greens	1	1997	Recess then moved to Murray Cup
Wagga Wagga	Kangaroos-Brothers	0	None	Formed after Brothers joined from the defunct Group 13. De-amalgamated after one season (1992) and reformed as Wagga Brothers and Wagga Kangaroos
Wagga Wagga	Magpies	3	1980, 1989, 1992	Amalgamated with Turvey Park Lions to form South City Bulls in 2005
West Wyalong	Mallee Men	4	1938, 1960, 1965–66	Moved to Group 20 in 1967

=== Pre-1966 Schism ===
- Adelong
- Ariah Park
- Bendick Murrell
- Boorowa
- Griffith
- Leeton
- Mildil
- Monteagle
- Wambanumba
- Wyangala Dam

== First Grade Grand Finals ==
Season	Premiers	Score	Runners-up	Referee	John Hill Medal	Venue	Date	Report
Group 9 Premiership
1933	Leeton Greens	23 – 7	Cowra Magpies	Mr. Poplin		Temora	17 September 1933	
1934	Leeton Greens (2)	14 – 6	Tumut Blues	Mr. Moreghan		Leeton	26 August 1934	
1935 – 1937: Various Challenge Cups contested only
1938	West Wyalong Mallee Men	34 – 14	Temora Dragons	H. Thomas		West Wyalong	31 July 1938	
1939	Cowra Magpies	13 – 7	Young Cherrypickers					
1940	Tumut Blues	15 – 10	West Wyalong Mallee Men	C. Gardiner		Junee	15 September 1940	
1941	Young Cherrypickers	18 – 12	Gundagai Tigers			Young	3 August 1941	
1942 – 1945: Suspended due to World War II
1946	Gundagai Tigers	15 – 3	West Wyalong Mallee Men	W. Lawrence		Temora	15 September 1946	
1947	Cootamundra Bulldogs	50 – 10	Young Cherrypickers	M. Ibbotson		Roberts' Park; Murrumburrah	31 August 1947	
1948	Cootamundra Bulldogs (2)	14 – 9	Young Cherrypickers			Fisher Park; Cootamundra	1 August 1948	
1949	Tumut Blues (2)	11 – 10	Griffith Black & Whites	M. Ibbotson		Cootamundra	28 August 1949	
1950	Cootamundra Bulldogs (3)	11 – 5	Junee Diesels	M. Ibbotson		Cootamundra Showground	1 October 1950	C
1951	Cootamundra Bulldogs (4)	16 – 13	West Wyalong Mallee Men	Mr. Boyton		Temora	14 October 1951	
1952	Young Cherrypickers (2)	14 – 11	Temora Dragons			Temora	12 October 1952	
1953	Young Cherrypickers (3)	9 – 7	Cootamundra Bulldogs	Mr. Boyton		Roberts' Park; Murrumburrah	20 September 1953	
1954	Cootamundra Bulldogs (5)	21 – 7	Temora Dragons			Fisher Park; Cootamundra	3 September 1954	
1955	Young Cherrypickers (4)	38 – 5	West Wyalong Mallee Men					
1956	Young Cherrypickers (5)	52 – 2	Tumbarumba Greens					
1957	Temora Dragons	13 – 7	Gundagai Tigers	Mr. Boyton		Cootamundra	8 September 1957	
1958	Temora Dragons (2)	46 – 9	Harden-Murrumburrah Hawks					
1959	Temora Dragons (3)	25 – 8	Harden-Murrumburrah Hawks					
1960	West Wyalong Mallee Men (2)	18 – 7	Harden-Murrumburrah Hawks					
1961	Temora Dragons (4)	19 – 4	Junee Diesels			Cootamundra		
1962	Harden-Murrumburrah Hawks	18 – 10	West Wyalong Mallee Men					
1963	Gundagai Tigers (2)	18 – 5	Tumut Blues					
1964	Junee Diesels	17 – 7	Harden-Murrumburrah Hawks					
1965	West Wyalong Mallee Men (3)	17 – 12	Tumut Blues					
1966	West Wyalong Mallee Men (4)	23 – 2	Temora Dragons					
Group 9/20 Premiership
1967	Griffith Waratahs	32 – 2	Leeton Greenies					
1968	West Wyalong Mallee Men (5)	15 – 4	Griffith Waratahs					
1969	Griffith Waratahs (2)	18 – 9	Griffith Black & Whites					
1970	West Wyalong Mallee Men (6)	19 – 18	Temora Dragons					
Group 8/9 Premiership
1967	Queanbeyan United Blues	14 – 6	Goulburn United Roosters	B. Chapman		Seiffert Oval Queanbeyan	24 September 1967	
1968	Young Cherrypickers (6)	8 – 8	Queanbeyan United Blues	K. Lyons		Seiffert Oval Queanbeyan	22 September 1968	
1969	Queanbeyan Kangaroos	8 – 2	Queanbeyan United Blues	B. Chapman		Seiffert Oval Queanbeyan	14 September 1969	
1970	Queanbeyan Kangaroos (2)	12 – 0	Queanbeyan United Blues	B. Chapman		Seiffert Oval Queanbeyan	27 September 1970	
Murrumbidgee Rugby League
1966	Wagga Magpies	20 – 0	Tumbarumba Greens					
1967	Wagga Magpies (2)	12 – 10	Tumut Blues					
1968	Wagga Kangaroos	17 – 11	Wagga Magpies					
Riverina Zone 3
1969	Wagga Kangaroos (2)	10 – 5	Wagga Magpies					
1970	Tumut Blues (3)	7 – 4	Wagga Kangaroos					
Group 9 Premiership
1971	Wagga Kangaroos (3)	26 – 8	Tumut Blues	T. Spain				
1972	Turvey Park Lions	19 – 5	Tumut Blues	T. Spain				
1973	Tumut Blues (4)	24 – 4	Wagga Kangaroos	T. Spain				
1974	Young Cherrypickers (7)	30 – 5	Cootamundra Bulldogs	W. Marshall				
1975	Turvey Park Lions (2)	26 – 6	Harden-Murrumburrah Hawks	T. Spain				
1976	Turvey Park Lions (3)	13 – 8	Temora Dragons	T. Spain				
1977	Temora Dragons (5)	18 – 5	Cootamundra Bulldogs	T. Spain				
1978	Wagga Kangaroos (4)	26 – 7	Tumut Blues	T. Spain				
1979	Wagga Kangaroos (5)	20 – 7	Harden-Murrumburrah Hawks	T. Spain				
1980	Wagga Magpies (3)	27 – 19	Young Cherrypickers	T. Spain				
1981	Harden-Murrumburrah Hawks (2)	18 – 15	Wagga Kangaroos	T. Spain				
1982	Cootamundra Bulldogs (6)	14 – 8	Tumut Blues	T. Spain				
1983	Gundagai Tigers (3)	40 – 14	Young Cherrypickers	T. Spain				
1984	Young Cherrypickers (8)	32 – 12	Gundagai Tigers	T. Spain		Eric Weissel Oval; Wagga Wagga		
1985	Wagga Kangaroos (6)	28 – 12	Wagga Magpies	L. Regent		Eric Weissel Oval; Wagga Wagga		
1986	Junee Diesels (2)	10 – 6	Young Cherrypickers	P. Hay		Fisher Park; Cootamundra		
1987	Wagga Kangaroos (7)	37 – 8	Temora Dragons	P. Hay		Eric Weissel Oval; Wagga Wagga		
1988	Cootamundra Bulldogs (7)	22 – 16	Temora Dragons	P. Hay		Alfred Park; Young		
1989	Wagga Magpies (4)	24 – 23	Temora Dragons	P. Hay		Eric Weissel Oval; Wagga Wagga		
1990	Cootamundra Bulldogs (8)	16 – 8	Temora Dragons	B. Jacobson		Eric Weissel Oval; Wagga Wagga		
1991	Young Cherrypickers (9)	16 – 6	Wagga Magpies	B. Jacobson		Eric Weissel Oval; Wagga Wagga		
1992	Wagga Magpies (5)	16 – 4	Tumut Blues	T. Fletcher		Eric Weissel Oval; Wagga Wagga		
1993	Turvey Park Lions (4)	24 – 10	Gundagai Tigers	B. Jacobson		Eric Weissel Oval; Wagga Wagga		
1994	Wagga Kangaroos (8)	24 – 20	Gundagai Tigers	L. Pearce		Eric Weissel Oval; Wagga Wagga		
1995	Wagga Brothers	42 – 16	Wagga Magpies	J. Hetherington				
1996	Adelong-Batlow Bears	20 – 10	Harden-Murrumburrah Hawks	T. Fletcher				
1997	Tumbarumba Greens	28 – 22	Harden-Murrumburrah Hawks	T. Fletcher				
1998	Temora Dragons (6)	38 – 22	Young Cherrypickers	T. Fletcher				
1999	Wagga Kangaroos (9)	40 – 16	Harden-Murrumburrah Hawks	T. Fletcher				
2000	Wagga Kangaroos (10)	32 – 20	Tumbarumba Greens	T. Fletcher		Eric Weissel Oval; Wagga Wagga	10 September 2000	
2001	Wagga Kangaroos (11)	22 – 20	Temora Dragons	B. Nix		Eric Weissel Oval; Wagga Wagga	9 September 2001	
2002	Temora Dragons (7)	56 – 16	Turvey Park Lions	B. Nix		Eric Weissel Oval; Wagga Wagga	22 September 2002	
2003	Tumut Blues (5)	31 – 10	Gundagai Tigers	B. Nix		Eric Weissel Oval; Wagga Wagga	14 September 2003	
2004	Temora Dragons (8)	28 – 24	Gundagai Tigers	B. Nix		Eric Weissel Oval; Wagga Wagga	26 September 2004	
2005	Cootamundra Bulldogs (9)	19 – 12	Tumut Blues	B. Nix		Eric Weissel Oval; Wagga Wagga	25 September 2005	
2006	Temora Dragons (9)	40 – 16	Gundagai Tigers	B. Nix				
2007	Tumut Blues (6)	28 – 10	Wagga Brothers			Eric Weissel Oval; Wagga Wagga	23 September 2007	
2008	Tumut Blues (7)	20 – 14	Wagga Brothers	B. Nix		Fisher Park; Cootamundra	21 September 2008	
2009	Wagga Kangaroos (12)	42 – 4	Gundagai Tigers	B. Nix		Equex Centre; Wagga Wagga	26 September 2009	
2010	Tumut Blues (8)	22 – 8	Junee Diesels	B. Nix	Anthony Coyle	Lavington Sportsground; Albury	26 September 2010	
2011	South City Bulls	20 – 18	Gundagai Tigers	B. Nix		Equex Centre; Wagga Wagga	25 September 2011	
2012	Albury Thunder	36 – 26	South City Bulls	S. Muir	Willie Heta	Equex Centre; Wagga Wagga	23 September 2012	
2013	Albury Thunder (2)	30 – 20	Gundagai Tigers	B. Nix	Mitch Davis	Equex Centre; Wagga Wagga	29 September 2013	
2014	Albury Thunder (3)	45 – 4	South City Bulls	B. Nix	Willie Heta	Equex Centre; Wagga Wagga	28 September 2014	
2015	Gundagai Tigers (4)	28 – 16	Junee Diesels	B. Nix	Joel Field	Equex Centre; Wagga Wagga	13 September 2015	
2016	South City Bulls (2)	22 – 18	Gundagai Tigers	B. Nix	Nick Skinner	Equex Centre; Wagga Wagga	11 September 2016	
2017	South City Bulls (3)	24 – 8	Gundagai Tigers	S. Muir	Nathan Rose	Equex Centre; Wagga Wagga	10 September 2017	
2018	Gundagai Tigers (5)	13 – 6	South City Bulls	S. Muir	James Luff	McDonalds Park; Wagga Wagga	1 September 2018	
2019	Tumut Blues (9)	28 – 4	South City Bulls	S. Muir	Lachlan Bristow	McDonalds Park; Wagga Wagga	15 September 2019	
2020	Gundagai Tigers (6)	40 – 18	Tumut Blues	S. Muir	Luke Berkrey	McDonalds Park; Wagga Wagga	27 September 2020	
2021	Cancelled due to COVID-19 lockdown in NSW							
2022	Gundagai Tigers (7)	34 – 4	Young Cherrypickers	S. Muir	Nathan Rose	McDonalds Park; Wagga Wagga	18 September 2022	
2023	Tumut Blues (10)	23 – 18	Wagga Kangaroos	B. Whitby	Lachlan Bristow	McDonalds Park; Wagga Wagga	17 September 2023	
2024	Young Cherrypickers (10)	16 – 12	Wagga Kangaroos	B. Whitby	Nic Hall	McDonalds Park; Wagga Wagga	22 September 2024	
2025	Gundagai Tigers (8)	10 – 6	Wagga Kangaroos	S. Muir	Tyron Gorman	Geohex Park; Wagga Wagga	21 September 2025	
2026	Gundagai Tigers (9)	24 – 16	Temora Dragons (9)	B. Baker	Royce Tout	Geohex Park; Wagga Wagga	20 September 2026	

=== Team Performance ===
Team	Winners	Runners-up	Years won	Years runner-up
Wagga Wagga Kangaroos	12	6	1968, 1969, 1971, 1978, 1979, 1985, 1987, 1994, 1999, 2000, 2001, 2009	1970, 1973, 1981, 2023, 2024, 2025
Tumut Blues	10	11	1940, 1949, 1970, 1973, 2003, 2007, 2008, 2010, 2019, 2023	1934, 1963, 1965, 1967, 1971, 1972, 1978, 1982, 1992, 2005, 2020
Young Cherrypickers	10	8	1941, 1952, 1953, 1955, 1956, 1968, 1974, 1984, 1991, 2024	1939, 1947, 1948, 1980, 1983, 1986, 1998, 2022
Temora Dragons	9	12	1957, 1958, 1959, 1961, 1977, 1998, 2002, 2004, 2006	1938, 1952, 1954, 1966, 1970, 1976, 1987, 1988, 1989, 1990, 2001, 2026
Cootamundra Bulldogs	9	3	1947, 1948, 1950, 1951, 1954, 1982, 1988, 1990, 2005	1953, 1974, 1977
Gundagai Tigers	9	13	1946, 1963, 1983, 2015, 2018, 2020, 2022, 2025, 2026	1941, 1957, 1984, 1993, 1994, 2003, 2004, 2006, 2009, 2011, 2013, 2016, 2017
West Wyalong Mallee Men	6	5	1938, 1960, 1965, 1966, 1968, 1970	1940, 1946, 1951, 1955, 1962
Wagga Magpies	5	5	1966, 1967, 1980, 1989, 1992	1968, 1969, 1985, 1991, 1995
Turvey Park Lions	4	1	1972, 1975, 1976, 1993	2002
South City Bulls	3	4	2011, 2016, 2017	2012, 2014, 2018, 2019
Albury Thunder	3	0	2012, 2013, 2014	–
Harden-Murrumburrah Hawks	2	9	1962, 1981	1958, 1959, 1960, 1964, 1975, 1979, 1996, 1997, 1999
Junee Diesels	2	4	1964, 1986	1950, 1961, 2010, 2015
Leeton Greenies	2	1	1933, 1934	1967
Griffith Waratah Tigers	2	1	1967, 1969	1968
Queanbeyan Kangaroos	2	0	1969, 1970	–
Queanbeyan United Blues	1	3	1967	1968, 1969, 1970
Tumbarumba Greens	1	3	1997	1956, 1966, 2000
Wagga Wagga Brothers	1	2	1995	2007, 2008
Cowra Magpies	1	1	1939	1933
Adelong-Batlow Bears	1	0	1996	–
Griffith Black & White Panthers	0	2	–	1949, 1969
Goulburn United Roosters	0	1	–	1967

== Reserve Grade Grand Finals ==
Season	Premiers	Score	Runners-up	Referee	Venue	Date
Group 9 Reserve Grade
1947	Gundagai Tigers	8 – 3	Young Cherrypickers			
1950	West Wyalong Mallee Men	10 – 5	Temora Dragons			
1951	Harden-Murrumburrah Hawks	7 – 6	Tumut Blues			
1952	Cowra Magpies	12 – 4	Cootamundra Bulldogs			
1953	Cootamundra Bulldogs	36 – 10	West Wyalong Mallee Men			
1954	Cootamundra Bulldogs (2)	11 – 3	West Wyalong Mallee Men			
1955	Tumbarumba Greens	13 – 6	Cootamundra Bulldogs			
1956	Gundagai Tigers (2)	14 – 7	Tumut Blues			
1957	Young Cherrypickers	23 – 5	Gundagai Tigers	L. Boyton	Young	15 September 1957
1958	Cootamundra Bulldogs (3)	19 – 6	Temora Dragons			
1959	Tumut Blues	6 – 0	Temora Dragons			
1960	Harden-Murrumburrah Hawks (2)	21 – 6	West Wyalong Mallee Men			
1961	Harden-Murrumburrah Hawks (3)	11 – 0	Junee Diesels			
1962	Junee Diesels	5 – 2	Tumut Blues			
1963	Junee Diesels (2)	8 – 6	Temora Dragons			
1964	Cootamundra Bulldogs (4)	8 – 5	Junee Diesels			
1965	Junee Diesels (3)	10 – 6	Tumut Blues			
1966	West Wyalong Mallee Men (2)	3 – 2	Cootamundra Bulldogs			
Group 9/20 Reserve Grade
1967	West Wyalong Mallee Men (3)	16 – 11	Griffith Black & Whites			
1968	Leeton Greenies	10 – 9	West Wyalong Mallee Men			
1969	Griffith Black & Whites	28 – 2	Barmedman Clydesdales			
1970	Griffith Black & Whites (2)	23 – 4	Temora Dragons			
Group 8/9 Reserve Grade
1967	Queanbeyan United Blues	22 – 14	Goulburn Workers Bulldogs	K. Lyons	Seiffert Oval Queanbeyan	24 September 1967
1968	Queanbeyan United Blues (2)	18 – 5	Goulburn Workers Bulldogs		Seiffert Oval Queanbeyan	22 September 1968
1969	Queanbeyan Kangaroos	6 – 0	Yass Magpies		Seiffert Oval Queanbeyan	14 September 1969
1970	Queanbeyan United Blues (3)	12 – 0	Queanbeyan Kangaroos		Seiffert Oval Queanbeyan	27 September 1970
Murrumbidgee Rugby League Reserve Grade
1966	Wagga Kangaroos	8 – 0	Tumut Blues			
1967	Tumut Blues (2)	16 – 10	Tarcutta			
1968	Tumut Blues (3)	25 – 7	Junee Diesels			
Riverina Zone 3 Reserve Grade
1969	Tumut Blues (4)	3 – 2	Wagga Kangaroos			
1970	Wagga Kangaroos (2)	5 – 2	Tumut Blues			
Group 9 Reserve Grade
1971	Tumut Blues (5)	16 – 6	Young Cherrypickers	J. Gerber		
1972	Cootamundra Bulldogs (5)	26 – 7	Wagga Kangaroos	J. Gerber		
1973	Young Cherrypickers (2)	21 – 7	Turvey Park Lions	J. Gerber		
1974	Young Cherrypickers (3)	12 – 8	Temora Dragons	T. Spain		
1975	Wagga Kangaroos (3)	18 – 17	Young Cherrypickers	T. Hilton		
1976	Young Cherrypickers (4)	30 – 7	Harden-Murrumburrah Hawks	T. Hilton		
1977	Wagga Kangaroos (4)	17 – 4	Temora Dragons	R. Riach		
1978	Young Cherrypickers (5)	18 – 11	Tumut Blues	T. Briggs		
1979	Young Cherrypickers (6)	22 – 5	Tumut Blues	K. Martin		
1980	Wagga Kangaroos (5)	19 – 6	Harden-Murrumburrah Hawks	T. Briggs		
1981	Temora Dragons	24 – 10	Young Cherrypickers	B. Barrett		
1982	Temora Dragons (2)	11 – 5	Tumut Blues	B. Barrett		
1983	Young Cherrypickers (7)	13 – 6	Temora Dragons	P. Hay		
1984	Temora Dragons (3)	22 – 14	Young Cherrypickers	P. Hay		
1985	Junee Diesels (4)	30 – 16	Wagga Kangaroos	P. Hay		
1986	Junee Diesels (5)	34 – 14	Gundagai Tigers	C. Patterson	Fisher Park; Cootamundra	
1987	Junee Diesels (6)	12 – 10	Temora Dragons	P. Walsh	Eric Weissel Oval; Wagga Wagga	
1988	Wagga Kangaroos (6)	24 – 12	Junee Diesels	P. O'Brien	Alfred Park; Young	
1989	Junee Diesels (7)	27 – 14	Wagga Magpies	P. O'Brien	Eric Weissel Oval; Wagga Wagga	
1990	Wagga Kangaroos (7)	23 – 14	Temora Dragons	P. O'Brien	Eric Weissel Oval; Wagga Wagga	
1991	Tumut Blues (6)	28 – 12	Wagga Kangaroos	B. Alston	Eric Weissel Oval; Wagga Wagga	
1992	Wagga Kangaroos-Brothers	18 – 4	Tumut Blues	J. Hetherington	Eric Weissel Oval; Wagga Wagga	
1993	Turvey Park Lions	17 – 12	Tumut Blues	J. Hetherington	Eric Weissel Oval; Wagga Wagga	
1994	Tumut Blues (7)	16 – 6	Gundagai Tigers	J. Hetherington	Eric Weissel Oval; Wagga Wagga	
1995	Harden-Murrumburrah Hawks (4)	13 – 10	Junee Diesels	T. Fletcher		
1996	Turvey Park Lions (2)	40 – 4	Tumut Blues	J. Hetherington		
1997	Harden-Murrumburrah Hawks (5)	20 – 6	Young Cherrypickers	L. Pearce		
1998	Turvey Park Lions (3)	32 – 20	Tumut Blues	C. Levy		
1999	Adelong-Batlow Bears	14 – 10	Harden-Murrumburrah Hawks	L. Pearce		
2000	Gundagai Tigers (3)	30 – 18	Young Cherrypickers	L. Pearce	Eric Weissel Oval; Wagga Wagga	10 September 2000
2001	Tumut Blues (8)	22 – 20	Young Cherrypickers	W. Prosser	Eric Weissel Oval; Wagga Wagga	9 September 2001
2002	Gundagai Tigers (4)	30 – 8	Wagga Magpies	T. Fletcher	Eric Weissel Oval; Wagga Wagga	22 September 2002
2003	Gundagai Tigers (5)	28 – 0	Tumut Blues	W. Bowden	Eric Weissel Oval; Wagga Wagga	14 September 2003
2004	Young Cherrypickers (8)	25 – 12	Tumut Blues	W. Bowden	Eric Weissel Oval; Wagga Wagga	26 September 2004
2005	Tumut Blues (9)	34 – 4	Wagga Kangaroos	S. Muir	Eric Weissel Oval; Wagga Wagga	25 September 2005
2006	Junee Diesels (8)	16 – 10	Temora Dragons	W. Bowden		
2007	Cootamundra Bulldogs (6)	48 – 10	Young Cherrypickers	L. O'Brien	Eric Weissel Oval; Wagga Wagga	
2008	Junee Diesels (9)	20 – 14	Wagga Brothers	S. Muir	Fisher Park; Cootamundra	21 September 2008
2009	Wagga Brothers	10 – 4	Wagga Kangaroos	S. Muir	Equex Centre; Wagga Wagga	26 September 2009
2010	Lavington Panthers	34 – 10	Wagga Brothers	S. Muir	Lavington Sportsground; Albury	26 September 2010
2011	Albury Thunder (2)	28 – 10	Junee Diesels	S. Muir	Equex Centre; Wagga Wagga	25 September 2011
2012	Albury Thunder (3)	20 – 18	Gundagai Tigers	B. Nix	Equex Centre; Wagga Wagga	23 September 2012
2013	Wagga Brothers (2)	26 – 24	Gundagai Tigers	J. White	Equex Centre; Wagga Wagga	29 September 2013
2014	Gundagai Tigers (6)	28 – 22	Albury Thunder	S. Muir	Equex Centre; Wagga Wagga	28 September 2014
2015	Gundagai Tigers (7)	32 – 6	Albury Thunder	S. Muir	Equex Centre; Wagga Wagga	13 September 2015
2016	Gundagai Tigers (8)	16 – 12	South City Bulls	S. Muir	Equex Centre; Wagga Wagga	11 September 2016
2017	South City Bulls	22 – 4	Temora Dragons	J. White	Equex Centre; Wagga Wagga	10 September 2017
2018	South City Bulls (2)	18 – 6	Wagga Kangaroos	S. Bartlett	McDonalds Park; Wagga Wagga	1 September 2018
2019	Gundagai Tigers (9)	28 – 8	Young Cherrypickers	B. Whitby	McDonalds Park; Wagga Wagga	15 September 2019
2020	Gundagai Tigers (10)	10 – 10	Young Cherrypickers	S. Byatt	McDonalds Park; Wagga Wagga	27 September 2020
2021	Cancelled due to COVID-19 lockdown in NSW					
2022	Junee Diesels (10)	14 – 10	Gundagai Tigers	D. Ryan	McDonalds Park; Wagga Wagga	18 September 2022
2023	Young Cherrypickers (9)	38 – 16	South City Bulls	S. Muir	McDonalds Park; Wagga Wagga	17 September 2023
2024	Gundagai Tigers (11)	18 – 16	Albury Thunder	D. Ryan	McDonalds Park; Wagga Wagga	22 September 2024
2025	Wagga Kangaroos (8)	17 – 12	Albury Thunder	D. Ryan	Geohex Park; Wagga Wagga	21 September 2025
2026	Albury Thunder (4)	18 – 12	Temora Dragons	J. Benson	Geohex Park; Wagga Wagga	20 September 2026

=== Team Performance ===
Team	Winners	Runners-up	Years won	Years runner-up
Gundagai Tigers	11	5	1947, 1956, 2000, 2002, 2003, 2014, 2015, 2016, 2019, 2020, 2024	1957, 1986, 1994, 2012, 2013, 2022
Junee Diesels	10	6	1962, 1963, 1965, 1985, 1986, 1987, 1989, 2006, 2008, 2022	1961, 1964, 1968, 1988, 1995, 2011
Young Cherrypickers	9	11	1957, 1973, 1974, 1976, 1978, 1979, 1983, 2004, 2023	1947, 1971, 1975, 1981, 1984, 1997, 2000, 2001, 2007, 2019, 2020
Tumut Blues	8	15	1959, 1967, 1968, 1969, 1971, 1994, 2001, 2005	1951, 1956, 1962, 1965, 1966, 1970, 1978, 1979, 1982, 1992, 1993, 1996, 1998, 2003, 2004
Wagga Kangaroos	8	8	1966, 1970, 1975, 1977, 1980, 1988, 1990, 2025	1969, 1972, 1985, 1991, 2005, 2009, 2018
Cootamundra Bulldogs	6	3	1953, 1954, 1958, 1964, 1972, 2007	1952, 1955, 1966
Harden-Murrumburrah Hawks	5	3	1951, 1960, 1961, 1995, 1997	1976, 1980, 1999
Temora Dragons	4	13	1981, 1982, 1984, 1991	1950, 1958, 1959, 1963, 1970, 1974, 1977, 1983, 1987, 1990, 2006, 2017, 2026
Lavington Panthers/ Albury Thunder	4	4	2010, 2011, 2012, 2026	2014, 2015, 2024, 2025
West Wyalong Mallee Men	3	4	1950, 1966, 1967	1953, 1954, 1960, 1968
Turvey Park Lions	3	1	1993, 1996, 1998	1973
Queanbeyan United Blues	3	0	1967, 1968, 1970	–
Wagga Brothers	2	2	2009, 2013	2008, 2010
Griffith Black & White Panthers	2	1	1969, 1970	1967
South City Bulls	2	1	2017, 2018	2016, 2023
Queanbeyan Kangaroos	1	1	1969	1970
Cowra Magpies	1	0	1952	–
Tumbarumba Greens	1	0	1955	–
Leeton Greenies	1	0	1968	–
Wagga Kangaroos-Brothers	1	0	1992	–
Adelong-Batlow Bears	1	0	1999	–
Goulburn Workers Bulldogs	0	2	–	1967, 1968
Wagga Magpies	0	2		1989, 2002
Tarcutta	0	1	–	1967
Barmedman Clydesdales	0	1	–	1969
Yass Magpies	0	1	–	1969

== Women's Tackle Grand Finals ==
Season	Premiers	Score	Runners-up	Referee	Venue	Date
Group 9 Under 18s
2025	Young Cherrypickers	16 – 10	Estella Storm	C. Kirkman	Geohex Park; Wagga Wagga	21 September 2025
2026	Junee Diesels	20 – 6	Wagga Brothers	C. Kirkman	Geohex Park; Wagga Wagga	20 September 2026

=== Team Performance ===
Team	Winners	Runners-up	Years won	Years runner-up
Young Cherrypickers	1	0	2025	–
Junee Diesels	1	0	2026	–
Estella Storm	0	1	–	2025
Wagga Brothers	0	1	–	2026

== Under 18/19s Grand Finals ==
Group Nine has run two under-age competitions since 1971. Clubs in the older division compete for the Weissel Cup. This is not to be confused with the Weissel Medal, an award for the First Grade Player of the Year. Both awards are named in honour of the late Eric Weissel, an Australian representative who played and coached several clubs in the region.

Season	Premiers	Score	Runners-up	Referee	Venue	Date
Group 9 Under 18s
1971	Wagga Magpies	12 – 7	Young Cherrypickers	K. Robotham		
1972	Temora Dragons	22 – 9	Tumut Blues	J. Castle		
1973	Young Cherrypickers	33 – 10	Junee Diesels	J. Craig		
1974	Turvey Park Lions	32 – 11	Young Cherrypickers	N. Hand		
1975	Young Cherrypickers (2)	26 – 5	Cootamundra Bulldogs	G. Negline		
1976	Turvey Park Lions (2)	16 – 2	Wagga Magpies	R. Riach		
1977	Young Cherrypickers (3)			M. Newman		
1978	Wagga Kangaroos	16 – 8	Turvey Park Lions	M. Newman		
1979	Junee Diesels	37 – 16	Young Cherrypickers	M. Newman		
1980	Turvey Park Lions (3)	20 – 13	Young Cherrypickers	B. Barrett		
1981	Wagga Magpies (2)	37 – 8	Young Cherrypickers	J. Hetherington		
1982	Tumut Blues	19 – 10	Turvey Park Lions	P. Hay		
1983	Young Cherrypickers (4)	14 – 8	Turvey Park Lions	C. Patterson		
1984	Junee Diesels (2)	26 – 20	Young Cherrypickers	C. Patterson		
1985	Junee Diesels (3)	20 – 14	Young Cherrypickers	P. Kidd		
1986	Junee Diesels (4)	22 – 12	Young Cherrypickers	P. Kidd	Fisher Park; Cootamundra	
1987	Young Cherrypickers (5)	18 – 10	Temora Dragons	P. Kidd	Eric Weissel Oval; Wagga Wagga	
1988	Temora Dragons (2)	20 – 10	Young Cherrypickers	B. Jacobson	Alfred Park; Young	
1989	Young Cherrypickers (6)	28 – 10	Temora Dragons	P. Kidd	Eric Weissel Oval; Wagga Wagga	
1990	Wagga Kangaroos (2)	62 – 12	Temora Dragons	B. Alston	Eric Weissel Oval; Wagga Wagga	
1991	Young Cherrypickers (7)	34 – 22	Wagga Kangaroos	T. Fletcher	Eric Weissel Oval; Wagga Wagga	
1992	Young Cherrypickers (8)			B. Alston		
1993	Turvey Park Lions (4)	33 – 24	Wagga Kangaroos	L. Pearce	Eric Weissel Oval; Wagga Wagga	
1994	Harden-Murrumburrah Hawks	38 – 20	Young Cherrypickers	S.Pike	Eric Weissel Oval; Wagga Wagga	
1995	Junee Diesels (5)	24 – 12	Wagga Kangaroos	S. Muir		
1996	Wagga Brothers	32 – 10	Cootamundra Bulldogs	L. Pearce		
1997	Wagga Brothers (2)	36 – 14	Cootamundra Bulldogs	S. Levy		
1998	Wagga Magpies (3)	14 – 10	Gundagai Tigers	W. Prosser		
1999	Gundagai Tigers	24 – 20	Temora Dragons	S. Muir		
2000	Young Cherrypickers (9)	18 – 16	Gundagai Tigers	G. Payne	Eric Weissel Oval; Wagga Wagga	10 September 2000
2001	Wagga Kangaroos (3)	16 – 10	Young Cherrypickers	W. Bowden	Eric Weissel Oval; Wagga Wagga	9 September 2001
2002	Young Cherrypickers (10)	30 – 20	Wagga Kangaroos	W. Bowden	Eric Weissel Oval; Wagga Wagga	22 September 2002
2003	Tumut Blues (2)	23 – 12	Young Cherrypickers	M. Carter	Eric Weissel Oval; Wagga Wagga	14 September 2003
2004	Tumut Blues (3)	14 – 12	Harden-Murrumburrah Hawks	P. Hargraves	Eric Weissel Oval; Wagga Wagga	26 September 2004
2005	Young Cherrypickers (11)	24 – 16	Temora Dragons	W. Bowden	Eric Weissel Oval; Wagga Wagga	25 September 2005
2006	Temora Dragons (3)			S. Muir		
2007	Junee Diesels (6)	40 – 28	Young Cherrypickers	B. Hartley	Eric Weissel Oval; Wagga Wagga	
2008	Temora Dragons (4)	18 – 10	Young Cherrypickers	L. O'Brien	Fisher Park; Cootamundra	21 September 2008
2009	Cootamundra Bulldogs	20 – 8	Gundagai Tigers	J. White	Equex Centre; Wagga Wagga	26 September 2009
2010	Wagga Kangaroos (4)	20 – 8	Tumut Blues	J. White	Lavington Sportsground; Albury	26 September 2010
2011	Wagga Brothers (3)	34 – 12	Tumut Blues	J. White	Equex Centre; Wagga Wagga	25 September 2011
2012	Temora Dragons (5)	31 – 16	Young Cherrypickers	M. Daly	Equex Centre; Wagga Wagga	23 September 2012
2013	Temora Dragons (6)	32 – 26	Wagga Kangaroos	S. Went	Equex Centre; Wagga Wagga	29 September 2013
2014	Wagga Brothers (4)	23 – 10	Temora Dragons	J. White	Equex Centre; Wagga Wagga	28 September 2014
2015	Temora Dragons (7)	34 – 20	South City Bulls	J. White	Equex Centre; Wagga Wagga	13 September 2015
2016	South City Bulls	18 – 14	Wagga Brothers	B. Hart	Equex Centre; Wagga Wagga	11 September 2016
2017	Wagga Kangaroos (5)	32 – 18	South City Bulls	B. Hart	Equex Centre; Wagga Wagga	10 September 2017
2018	Young Cherrypickers (12)	14 – 10	South City Bulls	B. Hart	McDonalds Park; Wagga Wagga	1 September 2018
Group 9 Under 19s
2019	Young Cherrypickers (13)	36 – 12	Gundagai Tigers	C. Kirkman	McDonalds Park Wagga Wagga	15 September 2019
Group 9 Under 18s
2020	Wagga Kangaroos (6)	14 – 10	Wagga Brothers	C. Kirkman	McDonalds Park Wagga Wagga	27 September 2020
2021	Cancelled due to COVID-19 lockdown in NSW					
2022	Junee Diesels (7)	16 – 14	Young Cherrypickers	B.Baker	McDonalds Park; Wagga Wagga	18 September 2022
2023	South City Bulls (2)	22 –16	Young Cherrypickers	I. Cornell	McDonalds Park; Wagga Wagga	17 September 2023
2024	Young Cherrypickers (14)	16 – 12	Wagga Kangaroos	I. Cornell	McDonalds Park; Wagga Wagga	22 September 2024
2025	Cootamundra Bulldogs (2)	26 – 22	Wagga Kangaroos	H. Fallah	Geohex Park; Wagga Wagga	21 September 2025
2026	Wagga Kangaroos	28 – 24	Wagga Brothers	S. Muir	Geohex Park; Wagga Wagga	20 September 2026

=== Team Performance ===
Team	Winners	Runners-up	Years won	Years runner-up
Young Cherrypickers	14	16	1973, 1975, 1977, 1983, 1987, 1989, 1991, 1992, 2000, 2002, 2005, 2018, 2019, 2024	1971, 1974, 1979, 1980, 1981, 1984, 1985, 1986, 1988, 1994, 2001, 2003, 2007, 2008, 2022, 2023
Temora Dragons	7	5	1972, 1988, 2006, 2008, 2012, 2013, 2015	1987, 1989, 1990, 1999, 2005
Wagga Kangaroos	7	6	1978, 1990, 2001, 2010, 2017, 2020, 2026	1991, 1993, 1995, 2002, 2024, 2025
Junee Diesels	7	1	1979, 1984, 1985, 1986, 1995, 2007, 2022	1973
Wagga Brothers	4	3	1996, 1997, 2011, 2014	2016, 2020, 2026
Turvey Park Lions	4	3	1974, 1976, 1980, 1993	1978, 1982, 1983
Wagga Magpies	3	1	1971, 1981, 1998	1976
Tumut Blues	3	3	1982, 2003, 2004	1972, 2010, 2011
Cootamundra Bulldogs	2	3	2009, 2025	1975, 1996, 1997
South City Bulls	2	3	2016, 2023	2015, 2017, 2018
Gundagai Tigers	1	4	1999	1998, 2000, 2009, 2019
Harden-Murrumburrah Hawks	1	1	1994	2004

== Ladies League Tag Grand Finals ==
Season	Premiers	Score	Runners-up	Referee	Venue	Date
Group 9 Ladies League Tag
2008	Wagga Kangaroos	6 – 4	Temora Dragons	G. White	Fisher Park Cootamundra	21 September 2008
2009	Temora Dragons	16 – 4	Wagga Brothers	M. Kirkman	Equex Centre; Wagga Wagga	27 September 2009
2010	Temora Dragons (2)	12 – 8		M. Kirkman	Lavington Sports Ground Albury	26 September 2010
2011	Wagga Brothers	34 – 10	Temora Dragons	M. Kirkman	Equex Centre; Wagga Wagga	25 September 2011
2012	Wagga Brothers (2)	16 – 6	Temora Dragons	M. Seldon	Equex Centre; Wagga Wagga	23 September 2012
2013	Wagga Brothers (3)	30 – 0	Temora Dragons	T. Popple	Equex Centre; Wagga Wagga	29 September 2013
2014	Wagga Brothers (4)	14 – 12	Temora Dragons	Z. Popple	Equex Centre; Wagga Wagga	28 September 2014
2015	Gundagai Tigers	12 – 8	Wagga Brothers	S. Byatt	Equex Centre; Wagga Wagga	13 September 2015
2016	Wagga Brothers (5)	34 – 4	Albury Thunder	S. Byatt	Equex Centre; Wagga Wagga	11 September 2016
2017	Wagga Brothers (6)	11 – 10	Albury Thunder	S. Byatt	Equex Centre; Wagga Wagga	10 September 2017
2018	Wagga Brothers (7)	18 – 0	Albury Thunder	S. Muir	McDonalds Park; Wagga Wagga	1 September 2018
2019	Wagga Brothers (8)	26 – 0	Temora Dragons	Z. McDonald	McDonalds Park Wagga Wagga	15 September 2019
2020	Young Cherrypickers	18 – 4	Wagga Kangaroos	S. Muir	McDonalds Park Wagga Wagga	27 September 2020
2021	Cancelled due to COVID-19 lockdown in NSW					
2022	Temora Dragons (3)	12 – 2	Wagga Brothers	M. Kirkman	McDonalds Park; Wagga Wagga	18 September 2022
2023	Temora Dragons (4)	10 – 8	Wagga Kangaroos	M. Kirkman	McDonalds Park; Wagga Wagga	17 September 2023
2024	Temora Dragons (5)	12 – 8	Wagga Brothers	M. Kirkman	McDonalds Park; Wagga Wagga	22 September 2024
2025	Wagga Brothers (9)	16 – 14	Temora Dragons	M. Kirkman	Geohex Park; Wagga Wagga	21 September 2025
2026	Temora Dragons (6)	18 – 6	Wagga Brothers	M. Kirkman	Geohex Park; Wagga Wagga	20 September 2026

=== Team Performance ===
Team	Winners	Runners-up	Years won	Years runner-up
Wagga Brothers	9	5	2011, 2012, 2013, 2014, 2016, 2017, 2018, 2019, 2025	2009, 2015, 2022, 2024, 2026
Temora Dragons	6	7	2009, 2010, 2022, 2023, 2024, 2026	2008, 2011, 2012, 2013, 2014, 2019, 2025
Wagga Kangaroos	1	1	2008	2020, 2023
Gundagai Tigers	1	0	2015	–
Young Cherrypickers	1	0	2020	–
Albury Thunder	0	1	–	2016, 2017, 2018

== Individual Awards ==
=== Eric Weissel Medal ===
Awarded to the best and fairest player in the first grade competition. John Shea of Harden-Murrumburrah has received the award the most times, with four wins.

Year	Player	Club
1973	John Shea	Harden-Murrumburrah
1974		
1975	John Shea	Harden-Murrumburrah
1976	Steve McDonald	Wagga Kangaroos
1977	Graeme Smith	Wagga Magpies
1978	Pat Smith & John Shea	Gundagai & Harden-Murrumburrah
1979	Craig Duffy	Temora
1980	Michael Hill	Young
1981	D. Timbs & John Shea	Temora & Harden-Murrumburrah
1982	Pat Cudmore	Junee
1983	Michael Scott	Young
1984	Peter Leitner	Harden-Murrumburrah
1985	Rod Slater	Young
1986	George Ashby	Gundagai
1987	Robert Anderson	Harden-Murrumburrah
1988	Gary Littlejohn	Wagga Magpies
1989	Michael Wilkinson	Tumut
1990	Chas Mascini	Wagga Kangaroos
1991	Mick Sell	Young
1992	Paul Strutt	Tumbarumba
1993	Brett Gale	Albury
1994	Chris Ward	Harden-Murrumburrah
1995	Mark Stimson	Temora
1996	Adam McGrath	Tumbarumba
1997	Chris Marland & Matthew Ridley	Temora & Wagga Magpies
1998	Todd Huggins	Junee
1999	Brett Cummins	Wagga Kangaroos
2000	Craig Blackhall	Tumbarumba
2001	Trevor Krause	Temora
2002	Scott England	Cootamundra
2003	William Goode & Peter McDonald	Temora & Gundagai
2004	Peter Jensen & Baden Power	Tumbarumba & Wagga Kangaroos
2005	Greg Lynch	Lavington
2006	Patrick Clark & Trevor Krause	Gundagai & Temora
2007	Warren Weir	Tumut
2008	Sam Quinn	Junee
2009	Adam Donaldson	Tumut
2010	Adam McCallum & Baden Power	Wagga Kangaroos & Wagga Kangaroos
2011	Kyle McCarthy	South City
2012	Ben McAlpine	Young
2013	James Smart	Gundagai
2014	Lou Goodwin	Albury
2015	James Luff	Gundagai
2016	Brett Eccleston	Gundagai
2017	James Smart	Gundagai
2018	Zac Masters	Tumut
2019	James Luff	Gundagai
2020	Not awarded - COVID-19 pandemic	
2021	Mitch Cornish	Young
2022	Lachlan Bristow	Tumut
2023	Tom Demeio	Young
2024	Kyle McCarthy	South City
2025	Hayden Philp	Temora
2026	Hamish Starr	Temora

== Recent Seasons ==
=== 2026 ===
==== Finals Series ====
Qualifying final
2	Gundagai	36
3	Junee	12
4	Young	6
5	Southcity	34

Major semi-final
1	Temora	6
Gundagai	42
Minor semi-final
Junee	18
Southcity	22

Preliminary final
Temora	22
Southcity	18

Grand final
Gundagai	24
Temora	16

== Juniors ==
=== Junior League Clubs ===
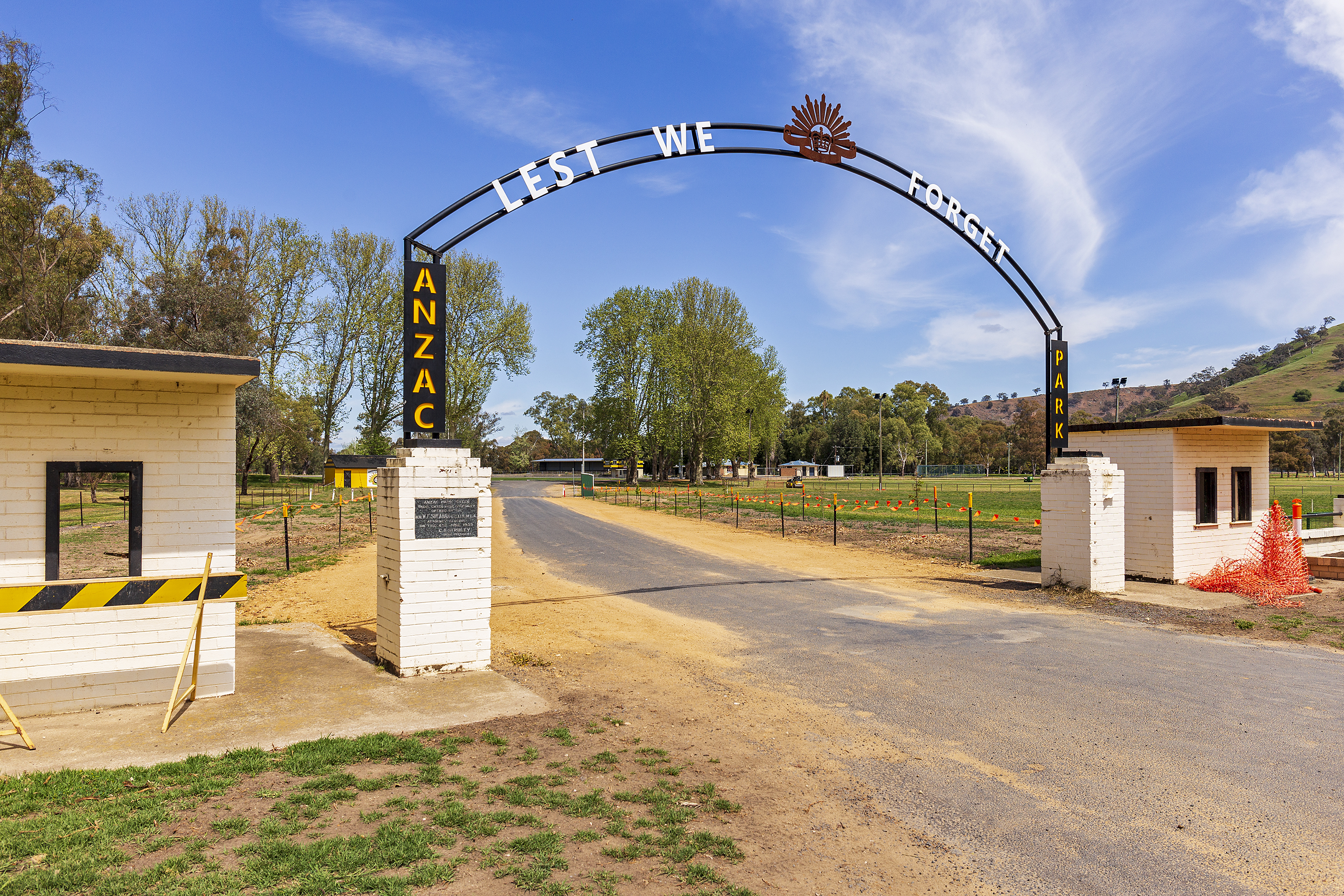
ANZAC Park gates, Gundagai

The following clubs participate in the Group 9 Junior Rugby League competition. Where applicable, the club's differing senior team or competition is listed in brackets.

- Albury Thunder JRL
- Coolamon Raiders JRL (senior club playing invitational matches only)
- Cootamundra Bulldogs JRL
- Estella Storm JRL (no seniors)
- Gundagai-Adelong Tigers JRL
- Harden-Boorowa (George Tooke Shield)
- Junee Diesels JRL
- Temora Dragons JRL
- Tumbarumba-Batlow Minor League (Goulburn Murray)
- Tumut Minor League
- Turvey Park Lions (South City Bulls)
- Wagga Wagga Brothers JRL
- Wagga Wagga Kangaroos JRL
- Wagga Wagga Magpies (South City Bulls)
- Young Cherrypickers JRL

=== Under 16/17s Grand Finals ===
Originally a part of the senior league from its inception in 1959 until 2024, the region's Under 16s competition joined the Group 9 Junior Rugby League setup prior to the 2025 season, becoming the top level of junior football in the region.

Season	Premiers	Score	Runners-up	Referee	Venue	Date
Group 9 Under 16s
1959	Cootamundra Bulldogs	9 – 8	Boorowa Bushrangers			
1960	Harden-Murrumburrah Hawks	24 – 0	Cootamundra Bulldogs			
1961	Cootamundra Bulldogs (2)	25 – 0	Gundagai Tigers			
1962	Gundagai Tigers	8 – 6	Tumut Blues			
1963	Gundagai Tigers (2)	26 – 2	Junee Diesels			
1964	Tumut Blues	20 – 3	Gundagai Tigers			
1965	Young Cherrypickers	15 – 0	Gundagai Tigers			
1966	Young Cherrypickers (2)	3 – 2	Temora Dragons			
Group 9/20 Under 16s
1968	Griffith Waratahs	30 – 9	West Wyalong Mallee Men			
1969	Griffith Waratahs (2)	24 – 19	Griffith Black & Whites			
1970	Griffith Black & Whites	5 – 3	Griffith Waratahs			
Murrumbidgee Rugby League Under 16s
1966	Wagga Kangaroos	10 – 5	Tumut Blues			
1967	Gundagai Tigers (3)	16 – 8	Tumut Blues			
1968	Turvey Park Lions	23 – 4	Gundagai Tigers			
Riverina Zone 3 Under 16s
1969	Tumut Blues (2)	9 – 5	Turvey Park Lions			
1970	Gundagai Tigers (4)	15 – 0	Wagga Magpies			
Group 9 Under 16s
1971	Tumut Blues (3)	12 – 4	Young Cherrypickers	T. Hilton		
1972	Turvey Park Lions (2)	23 – 22	Young Cherrypickers	M. Jones		
1973	Young Cherrypickers (3)	24 – 5	Cootamundra Bulldogs	B. Kevin		
1974	Turvey Park Lions (3)	16 – 9	Cootamundra Bulldogs	T. Briggs		
1975	Young Cherrypickers (4)	9 – 8	Turvey Park Lions	P. Robson		
1976	Wagga Kangaroos (2)	18 – 4	Gundagai Tigers	M. Newman		
1977	Tumut Blues (4)	23 – 3	Young Cherrypickers	D. McLeod		
1978	Tumut Blues (5)	22 – 15	Young Cherrypickers	R. Riach		
1979	Turvey Park Lions (4)	10 – 9	Temora Dragons	T. Briggs		
1980	Young Cherrypickers (5)	18 – 9	Wagga Brothers	P. Hay		
1981	Turvey Park Lions (5)	7 – 5	Young Cherrypickers	P. Hay		
1982	Wagga Kangaroos (3)	20 – 8	Junee Diesels	T. O'Connell		
1983	Young Cherrypickers (6)	26 – 22	Junee Diesels	T. O'Connell		
1984	Young Cherrypickers (7)	18 – 14	Wagga Kangaroos	P. O'Brien		
1985	Junee Diesels	34 – 24	Temora Dragons	C. Patterson		
1986	Young Cherrypickers (8)	10 – 6	Temora Dragons	P. Walsh		
1987	Young Cherrypickers (9)	28 – 0	Tumut Blues	B. Jacobson		
1988	Young Cherrypickers (10)	20 – 10	Wagga Kangaroos	B. Alston		
1989	Young Cherrypickers (11)	16 – 12	Temora Dragons	M. Rudd		
1990	Young Cherrypickers (12)	31 – 20	Temora Dragons	M. Rudd		
1991	Wagga Kangaroos (4)	18 – 4	Cootamundra Bulldogs	M. Rudd		
1992	Young Cherrypickers (13)	14 – 4	Wagga Kangaroos-Brothers	M. Payne		
1993	Temora Dragons	19 – 6	Wagga Kangaroos	S. Pike		
1994	Wagga Kangaroos (5)	26 – 4	Wagga Brothers	J. Lavin		
1995	Wagga Brothers	22 – 10	Albury Southern Rams	L. Pearce		
1996	Wagga Magpies	17 – 14	Tumut Blues	S. Muir		
1997	Wagga Kangaroos (6)	24 – 0	Cootamundra Bulldogs	W. Prosser		
1998	Tumut Blues (6)	14 – 8	Young Cherrypickers	G. Payne		
1999	Wagga Kangaroos (7)	32 – 0	Cootamundra Bulldogs	B. Nix		
2000	Temora Dragons (2)	18 – 8	Young Cherrypickers	R. Claffey		
2001	Temora Dragons (3)	24 – 12	Young Cherrypickers	K. Steel		
2002	Temora Dragons (4)	26 – 24	Tumut Blues	K. Steel		
2003	Wagga Brothers (2)	30 – 24	Young Cherrypickers	S. Skeers		
2004	Temora Dragons (5)	28 – 14	Tumut Blues	S. Muir		
2005	Junee Diesels (2)	26 – 14	South City Bulls	J. White		
2006	Young Cherrypickers (14)	22 – 16	Lavington Panthers	A. Summergreene		
2007	Wagga Brothers (3)	30 – 16	Young Cherrypickers	J. Hazelman	Eric Weissel Oval Wagga Wagga	23 September 2007
2008	Cootamundra Bulldogs (3)	36 – 4	South City Bulls	B. Hartley	Fisher Park; Cootamundra	21 September 2008
2009	Junee Diesels (3)	28 – 8	South City Bulls	S. Went	Equex Centre Wagga Wagga	26 September 2009
2010	Gundagai Tigers (5)	12 – 10	Wagga Brothers	S. Went	Lavington Sports Ground Albury	
2011	Temora Dragons (6)	36 – 22	Young Cherrypickers	S. Went	Equex Centre; Wagga Wagga	25 September 2011
2012	Wagga Kangaroos (8)	22 – 14	Cootamundra Bulldogs	S. Went	Equex Centre; Wagga Wagga	23 September 2012
2013	Cootamundra Bulldogs (4)	18 – 16	Junee Diesels	B. Cramp	Equex Centre; Wagga Wagga	29 September 2013
2014	Temora Dragons (7)	22 – 12	Wagga Brothers	B. Compton	Equex Centre; Wagga Wagga	28 September 2014
2015	South City Bulls	22 – 14	Young Cherrypickers	T. Popple	Equex Centre; Wagga Wagga	13 September 2015
2016	Wagga Kangaroos (9)			B. Whitby	Equex Centre; Wagga Wagga	11 September 2016
2017	Albury Thunder	16 – 10	Young Cherrypickers	T. Popple	Equex Centre; Wagga Wagga	10 September 2017
2018	Young Cherrypickers (15)	22 – 8	Wagga Brothers	M. Kirkman	McDonalds Park; Wagga Wagga	1 September 2018
Group 9 Under 17s
2019	Young Cherrypickers (16)	12 – 10	Gundagai Tigers	T. Maloney	McDonalds Park Wagga Wagga	15 September 2019
Group 9 Under 16s
2020	Junee Diesels (4)	34 – 4	Gundagai Tigers	I. Cornell	McDonalds Park Wagga Wagga	27 September 2020
2021	Cancelled due to COVID-19 lockdown in NSW					
2022	Wagga Brothers (4)	12 – 2	Tumut Blues		McDonalds Park; Wagga Wagga	18 September 2022
2023	Young Cherrypickers (17)	28 – 6	Wagga Kangaroos		McDonalds Park; Wagga Wagga	17 September 2023

==== Team Performance ====
Team	Winners	Runners-up	Years won	Years runner-up
Young Cherrypickers	17	12	1965, 1966, 1973, 1975, 1980, 1983, 1984, 1986, 1987, 1988, 1989, 1990, 1992, 2006, 2018, 2019, 2023	1971, 1972, 1977, 1978, 1981, 1998, 2000, 2001, 2003, 2007, 2011, 2017
Wagga Kangaroos	9	4	1966, 1976, 1982, 1991, 1994, 1997, 1999, 2012, 2016	1984, 1988, 1993, 2023
Temora Dragons	7	6	1993, 2000, 2001, 2002, 2004, 2011, 2014	1966, 1979, 1985, 1986, 1989, 1990
Tumut Blues	6	8	1964, 1969, 1971, 1977, 1978, 1998	1962, 1966, 1967, 1987, 1996, 2002, 2004, 2022
Gundagai Tigers	5	7	1962, 1963, 1967, 1970, 2010	1961, 1964, 1965, 1968, 1976, 2019, 2020
Turvey Park Lions	5	2	1968, 1972, 1974, 1979, 1981	1969, 1975
Cootamundra Bulldogs	4	7	1959, 1961, 2008, 2013	1960, 1973, 1974, 1991, 1997, 1999, 2012
Wagga Brothers	4	5	1995, 2003, 2007, 2022	1980, 1994, 2010, 2014, 2018
Junee Diesels	4	4	1985, 2005, 2009, 2020	1963, 1982, 1983, 2013
Griffith Waratah Tigers	2	1	1968, 1969	1970
South City Bulls	1	3	2015	2005, 2008, 2009
Albury Southern Rams / Thunder / Lavington Panthers	1	2	2017	1995, 2006
Griffith Black & White Panthers	1	1	1970	1969
Wagga Magpies	1	1	1996	1970
Harden-Murrumburrah Hawks	1	0	1960	–
Boorowa Bushrangers	0	1	–	1959
West Wyalong Mallee Men	0	1	–	1968
Wagga Kangaroos-Brothers	0	1	–	1992

=== Notable Group 9 Juniors ===
Albury Thunder

- Adrian Purtell
- Dylan Edwards

Cootamundra Bulldogs

- Mark Bryant
- Les Boyd
- Glen Buttriss
- Jack De Belin
- Paul Beath
- Luke Berkrey
- Dennis Luck

==== Gundagai Tigers ====
- Eric Freestone
- Cliff Lyons
- Maika Sivo

Junee Diesels

- Laurie Daley
- Jason Lidden
- Rick Keast
- Adam Perry
- Michael Dobson
- Craig Breen
- Phil Crowe

South City Bulls (Turvey Park/Wagga Magpies)

- Nick Skinner
- Latrell Siegwalt

Temora Dragons

- Mark Stimson
- Trent Barrett
- Todd Payten
- Josh McCrone
- Steve Reardon
- Ryan Hinchcliffe
- Mark Nicholls
- Ben Hampton
- Trevor Barnes
- Brendon Reeves
- Peter Stimson
- Gavin Price-Jones
- Jed Reardon
- Joe Stimson
- Liam Martin
- Zac Lomax
- Charlie Guymer

Wagga Wagga Brothers

- Jack Littlejohn

Wagga Wagga Kangaroos

- Peter Sterling
- Steve Mortimer
- John Bush
- Steve Martin
- Greg Watt
- Geoff Lawson
- Jeff Case
- Paul Upfield
- Marc Glanville
- Luke Priddis
- Jamie Soward
- Nigel Plum
- Cameron King

Young Cherrypickers

- Rod Slater
- Peter Spring
- Brett Mullins
- Simon Woolford
- Jordan McLean
- Angus Crichton
- Brett Hetherington
- Luke Davico
- Ron Lynch
- Peter Spring
- Peter Cusack

== See also ==
- Rugby League Competitions in Australia
