= Young Cherrypickers =

Australian rugby league football club

Young Cherrypickers RLFC
Club information
- Full name: Young Cherrypickers Rugby League Football Club
- Colours: Red; White; Navy

Current details
- Ground: Alfred Oval, Young
- Chairman: Andrew Smith
- Competition: Group 9 Rugby League

Records
- Premierships: 8 (1952, 1953, 1955, 1956, 1974, 1984, 1991, 2024.)

Young Cherrypickers Rugby League Club, founded in 1923, is an Australian rugby league football club based in Young, New South Wales. The club competes in the Group 9 Rugby League competition and conducts teams for both junior and senior teams.

== History ==
Young Cherrypickers was founded in 1923, along with the Group 9 competition itself.

Since its inception, the club has won eight first grade premierships in Group 9, in 1952, 1953, 1955, 1956, 1974, 1984, 1991 and 2024.

In 2022, the club made its first Grand Final appearance since 1998, though they lost 34-14 to the Gundagai Tigers. The club also won the Group 9 Challenge Cup in that same season.

== Notable Juniors ==
- Brett Mullins (1990-02 Canberra Raiders & Sydney Roosters)
- Brett Hetherington (1992-01 Canberra Raiders & North Queensland Cowboys)
- Luke Davico (1994-07 Canberra Raiders & Newcastle Knights)
- Simon Woolford (1994-08 Canberra Raiders & St George Illawarra Dragons)
- Jordan McLean (2013- Melbourne Storm)
- Angus Crichton (2016- South Sydney Rabbitohs & Sydney Roosters)
- Thomas Jenkins (2022- Penrith Panthers)
- James Schiller (2022- Canberra Raiders & Newcastle Knights)
