= Eric Weissel =

Australia international rugby league footballer

- Weissel in 1930

Personal information
- Full name: Eric Leslie Weissel
- Born: 16 February 1903 Cootamundra, New South Wales, Australia
- Died: 28 August 1972 (aged 69) Wagga Wagga, New South Wales, Australia

Playing information
- Position: Five-eighth
Club
Years	Team	Pld	T	G	FG	P
1921–26	Cootamundra
1927–34	Temora
1935–36	Barmedman
1937	Narrandera
1938–39	Wagga Wagga Magpies
	Total	0	0	0	0	0
Representative
Years	Team	Pld	T	G	FG	P
1928	New South Wales
1928–30	Australia	8				8

Eric Weissel (/waɪsəl/;) (1903–1972) was an Australian rugby league footballer, a state and national representative goal-kicking five-eighth. He played his club career in country New South Wales and is considered one of the nation's finest footballers of the 20th century.

== Biography and Club career ==
Weissel was born in Cootamundra in 1903. He died in 1972.

Weissel played his entire club football career in his home area of the Riverina in southern New South Wales. He rejected offers from Sydney and England clubs, choosing instead to stay in the district he called home, and turned out with five different clubs during an 18-year career: Cootamundra, Temora, Barmedman, Narrandera and Wagga Wagga. With Cootamundra he was captain during two years when they retained the regional Maher Cup with an unbeaten record. Weissel coached Wagga Magpies to win the Clayton Cup in 1939.

== Representative career ==
After being selected for New South Wales in 1928, Weissel made his international representative debut against a touring British side that same year, featuring in two Tests. He made the Australian squad for the 1929–30 Kangaroo tour of Great Britain, playing in three Tests and 17 tour matches. He topped the tour scoring tally with five tries and fifty-six goals on the tour. In the First Test at Hull, Weissel featured in the 31-8 Australian victory scoring a try and kicking five goals.

He played in all three Tests of the 1932 Domestic Ashes series against Great Britain, including the brutal "Battle of Brisbane" Test.

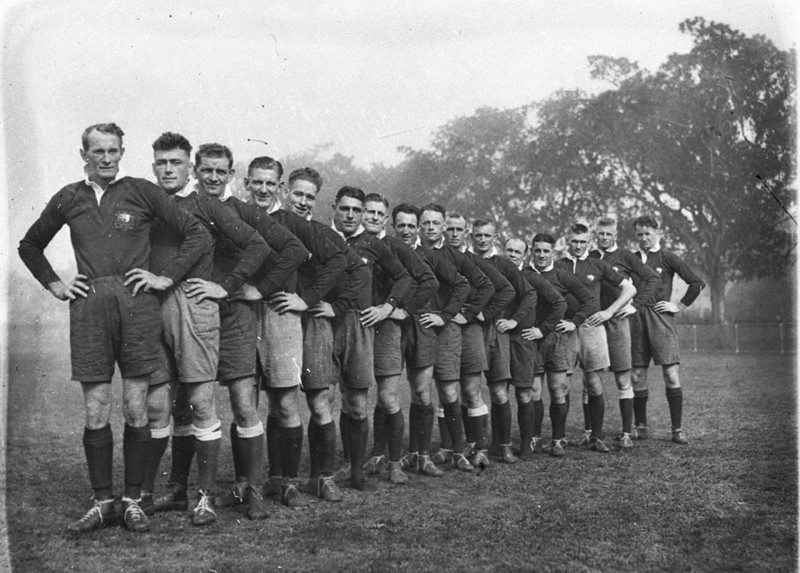
Weissel eighth from left, Kangaroos 1st Test 6 Jun 1932

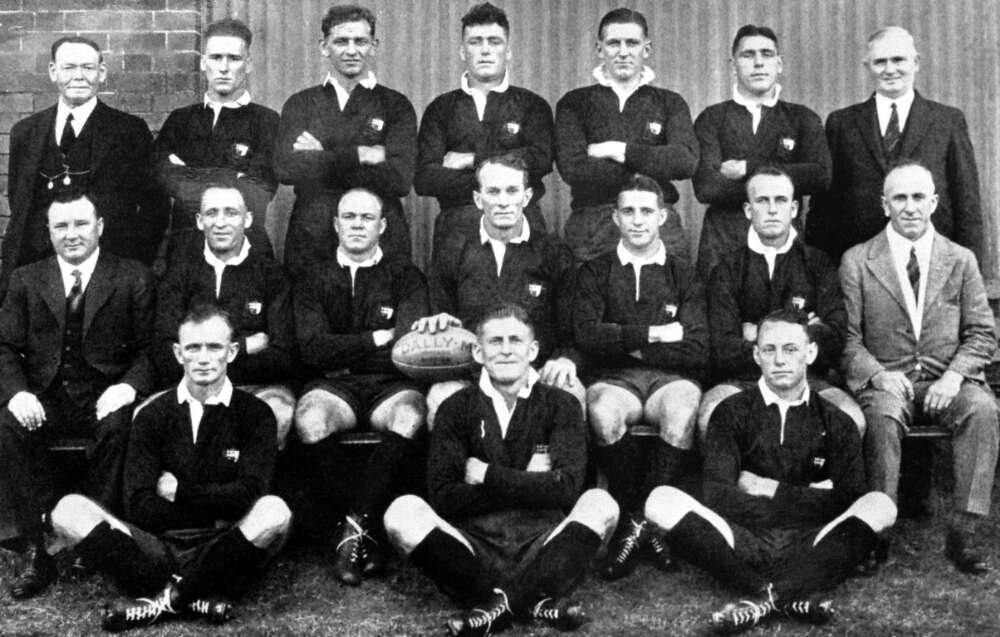
Run-on side 6 Jun 1932 Weissel seated 2nd from left

== Jack Hore Memorial Gold Cup ==
The Jack Hore Memorial Gold Cup was a challenge trophy generally contested between Rugby league teams representing towns and villages in the Central West of NSW. Its prestige rivaled that of the Maher Cup.

By 1930 Canowindra (then rumored to be "represented by the wealthiest team of footballers in world") and captained coached by international Rex Norman had been undefeated in 21 consecutive Hore trophy challenges. At this time Weissel was playing for the Temora club who issued a challenge to play for the trophy on Sunday 8 June 1930. However, Weissel had been selected by the NSW Rugby League to captain the state side against Queensland in Sydney on the Saturday. Temora badly wanted their star player to turn out against Canowindra as winning the Hore trophy was both prestigious and lucrative (an important consideration due to the economic downturn). Temora could not persuade the NSW Rugby League to release Weissel from his NSW obligations. So at the conclusion of the interstate match on the Saturday, Weissel boarded a car and overnight travelled the 300 km from Sydney to Canowindra over the Blue Mountains on rough country roads. The journey was completed safely and Weissel turned out to a warm reception from a large crowd. Temora won the match 26-7 and took home the trophy in the company of their supporters on a specially chartered train.

== Cricketer ==
Sean Fagan's rl1908.com site quotes a Donald Bradman biography which records that Weissel was playing for a Riverina representative side on 22 November 1926 at the Sydney Cricket Ground against a Southern Districts side in which Bradman was making his SCG debut. Weissel dismissed "the Don" for 43.

== Accolades ==
Since 1976 the Eric Weissel medal has been awarded to the best and fairest player of the season in the Riverina regional country rugby league competition.

The Eric Weissel Oval, a 10,000-seat stadium in Wagga Wagga was named in his honour.

In February 2008, Weissel was named in the list of Australia's 100 Greatest Players (1908–2007) which was commissioned by the NRL and ARL to celebrate the code's centenary year in Australia.

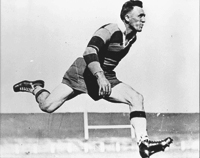
Eric Weissel

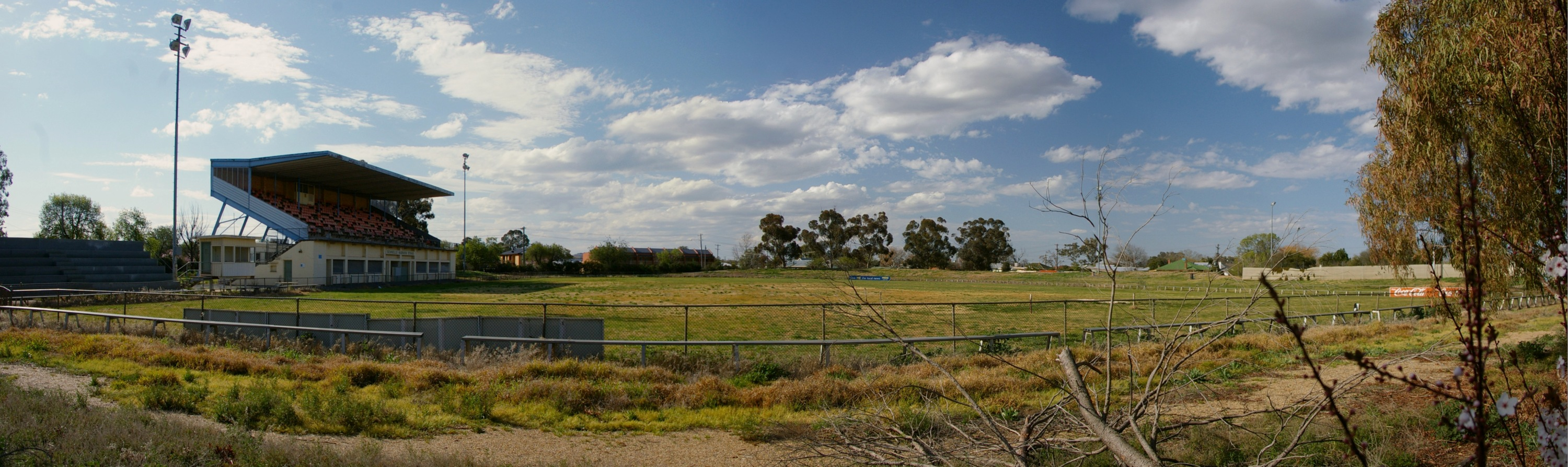
Eric Weissel Oval was the primary rugby league venue in Wagga Wagga from 1959 – 2007

== See also ==
- Eric Weissel Oval

== Sources ==
- Whiticker, Alan & Hudson, Glen (2006) The Encyclopedia of Rugby League Players, Gavin Allen Publishing, Sydney
- Andrews, Malcolm (2006) The ABC of Rugby League Austn Broadcasting Corpn, Sydney
