= Eric Weissel Oval =

Former stadium of Wagga Wagga, Australia

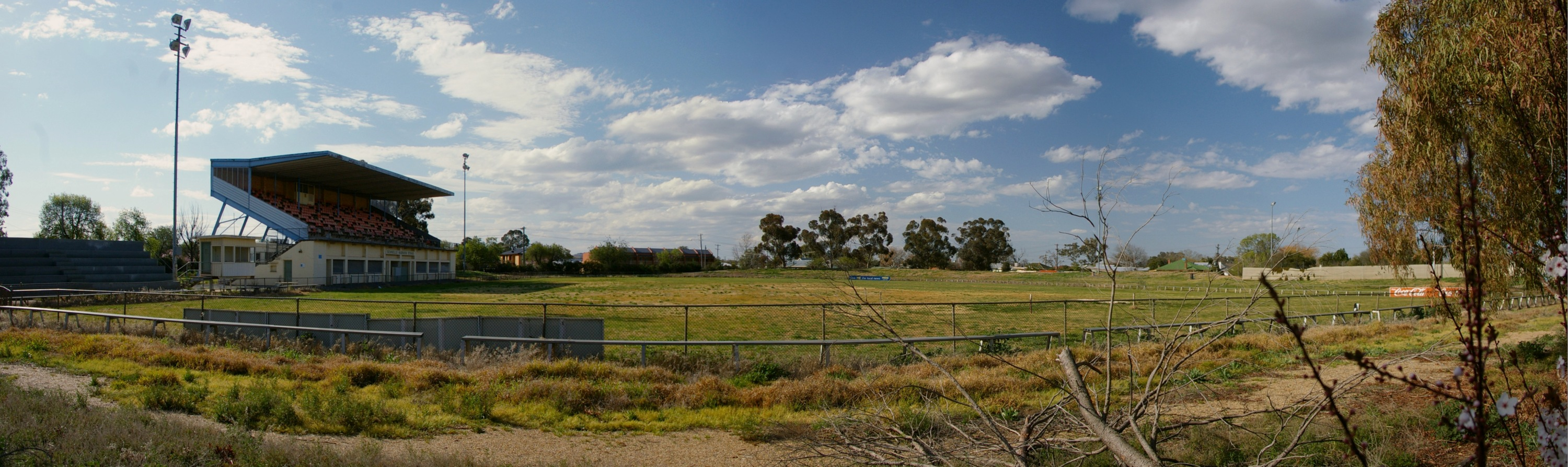
- Interactive map of Eric Weissel Oval
- Location: Wagga Wagga, New South Wales
- Coordinates: 35°6′37″S 147°21′5″E
- Capacity: 10,000
- Surface: Grass

Construction
- Opened: 1959
- Closed: 2007

Tenants
- Wagga Magpies RLFC (Group 9), Wagga Brothers RLFC & Ladysmith-Forest Hill United RLFC (Group 13)

Eric Weissel Oval was a multi-use stadium in Wagga Wagga, New South Wales, Australia. It was named after local rugby league footballer Eric Weissel and opened in 1959. It was used mostly for rugby league matches and had a capacity of 10,000 people, with a record crowd of 11,685 recorded on 20 July 1988 for the Australia vs Papua New Guinea as part of the 1985–1988 Rugby League World Cup where the Aussies defeated the Kumuls by a then world record score of 70–8. The oval has hosted City vs Country (ARL), National Rugby League premiership and trial games, Brumbies vs Waikato Chiefs (Rugby union).

== Name ==
The oval was named after Eric Weissel, a state and national representative rugby league five-eighth who played in the 1920s and 1930s. In spite of representative honours and the allure of the Sydney first grade competition Weissel played his entire club football career in the Riverina with five different clubs including Wagga Wagga.

== Closure and redevelopment ==
In June 2004 the owners of the oval, Wagga Wagga Leagues Club went into receivership, however the oval remained open up until 2007. In 2005 Wagga Wagga Leagues Club, Eric Weissel Oval and Allen Staunton Oval were sold to developers. The oval was rezoned from private recreation to residential by the Wagga Wagga City Council on 26 September 2005. In December 2008 the owners of the site, McIntyre Nash Pty Ltd, lodged an application to demolish which includes the removal of fencing, grandstand, change rooms and a broadcast box. The Oval was demolished in 2015 by McIntyre Nash along with the neighbouring leagues club, and the housing development is due to start in 2016.

== Notable Rugby League Matches ==
=== World Cup ===
| Date | Home | Score | Away | Referee | Crowd | Competition |
|---|---|---|---|---|---|---|
| 20 July 1988 | Australia | 70–8 | Papua New Guinea | Neville Kesha | 11,685 | 1985-1988 Rugby League World Cup |

=== International Tour Matches ===
| Date | Home | Score | Away | Referee | Crowd | Competition |
|---|---|---|---|---|---|---|
| 26 May 1954 | Riverina | 26–36 | Great Britain Lions | Eric McIlhatton | 10,732 | 1954 Great Britain Lions tour |
| 10 July 1974 | Riverina | 10–36 | Great Britain Lions | Graham Barby | 8,000 | 1974 Great Britain Lions tour |
| 4 June 1978 | Riverina | 18–25 | New Zealand Kiwis | Kevin Riolo | 3,000 | 1978 New Zealand Rugby League tour |
| 26 June 1979 | Riverina | 10–37 | Great Britain Lions | Noel Bissett | 8,403 | 1979 Great Britain Lions tour |
| 11 July 1982 | Riverina | 3–29 | New Zealand Kiwis | Ray Collins | 4,500 | 1982 New Zealand Rugby League tour |
| 26 June 1984 | Riverina | 18–22 | Great Britain Lions | Bill Foran | 3,000 | 1984 Great Britain Lions tour |
| 15 July 1986 | Riverina | 16–14 | New Zealand Kiwis | Barry Priest | 5,000 | 1986 New Zealand Rugby League tour |

=== City vs Country ===
| Date | Home | Score | Away | Referee | Crowd | Competition |
|---|---|---|---|---|---|---|
| 10 May 2002 | NSW Country | 16–26 | NSW City | Tim Mander | 8,342 | 2002 City vs Country Origin |

=== NSWRL Pre-Season/Midweek Cup ===
| Date | Home | Score | Away | Referee | Crowd | Competition |
|---|---|---|---|---|---|---|
| 23 April 1975 | Parramatta Eels | 27–19 | Monaro Colts | Tom Spain | 3,600 | 1975 Amco Cup Round 1 |
| 23 April 1975 | Canterbury-Bankstown Berries | 21–16 | Riverina Bulls | Laurie Bruyeres | 3,600 | 1975 Amco Cup Round 1 |
| 3 May 1978 | Riverina Bulls | 36–2 | Penrith Panthers | Tom Spain | 4,400 | 1978 Amco Cup Round 3 |
| 27 March 1985 | Canterbury Bankstown Bulldogs | 16–6 | Canberra Raiders | Steve Asbury | 8,500 | 1985 National Panasonic Cup Round 1 |
| 28 February 1988 | Eastern Suburbs Roosters | 36–16 | Western Suburbs Magpies | Mick Stone | 6,832 | 1988 Panasonic Cup Round 1 |
| 26 April 1989 | Manly Warringah Sea Eagles | 22–10 | St George Dragons | Greg McCallum | 9,831 | 1989 Panasonic Cup Round 1 |
| 6 March 1991 | Penrith Panthers | 34–6 | Canterbury Bankstown Bulldogs | Greg McCallum | 9,000 | 1991 Lotto Challenge Cup Semi-Final 1 |
| 1 March 1992 | Brisbane Broncos | 14–10 | Gold Coast Seagulls | Ian Parnaby | 9,320 | 1992 Tooheys Challenge Cup; Quarter Finals 1 and 2 |
| 1 March 1992 | Western Suburbs Magpies | 16–14 | Penrith Panthers | Greg McCallum | 9,320 | 1992 Tooheys Challenge Cup; Quarter Finals 1 and 2 |

=== NRL ===
| Date | Home | Score | Away | Referee | Crowd | Competition |
|---|---|---|---|---|---|---|
| 16 August 1998 | Sydney City Roosters | 34–10 | Gold Coast Chargers | Paul Simpkins | 4,115 | 1998 NRL season, Round 23 |

== Gallery ==
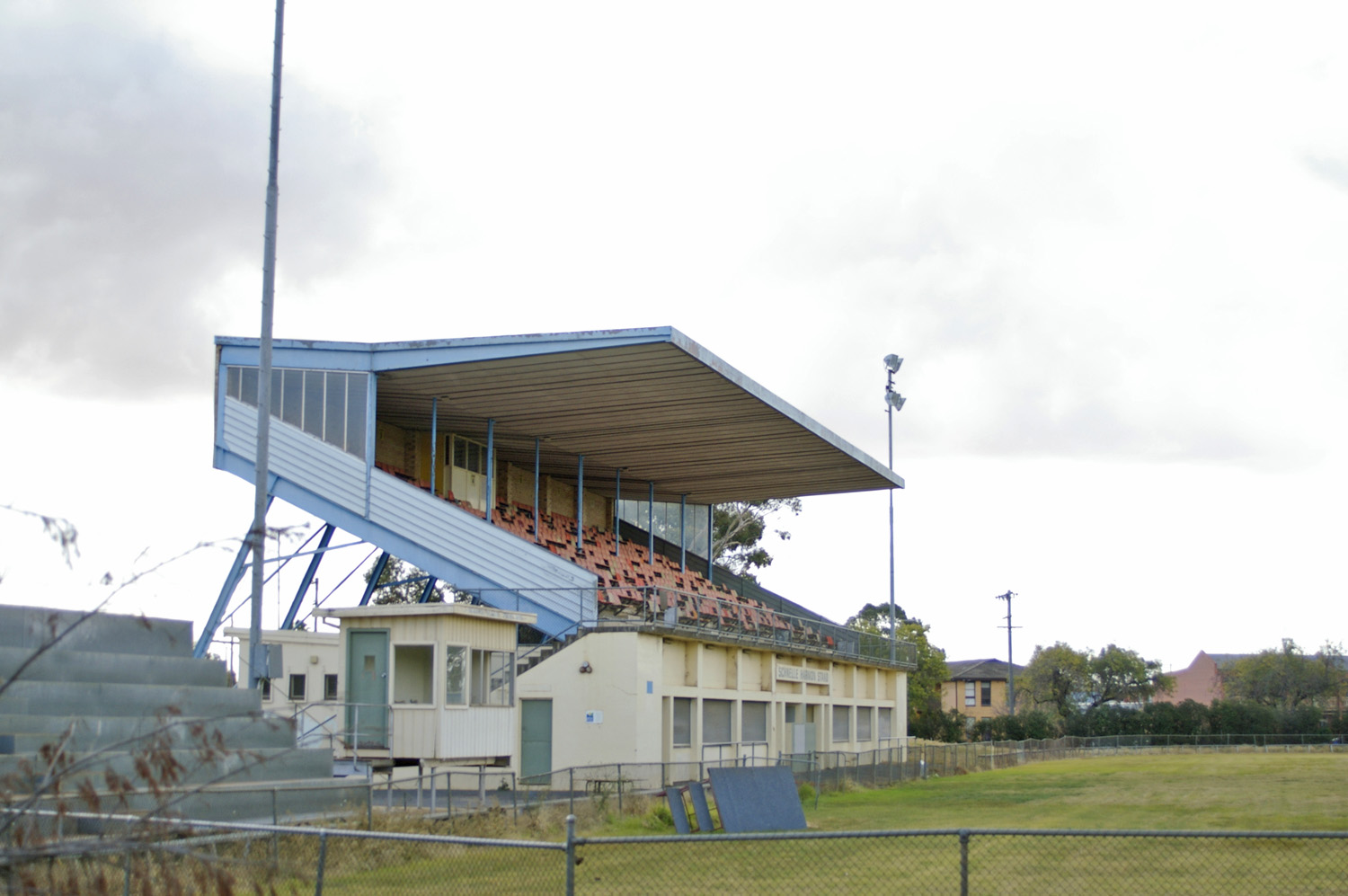
Schnelle Harmon Stand

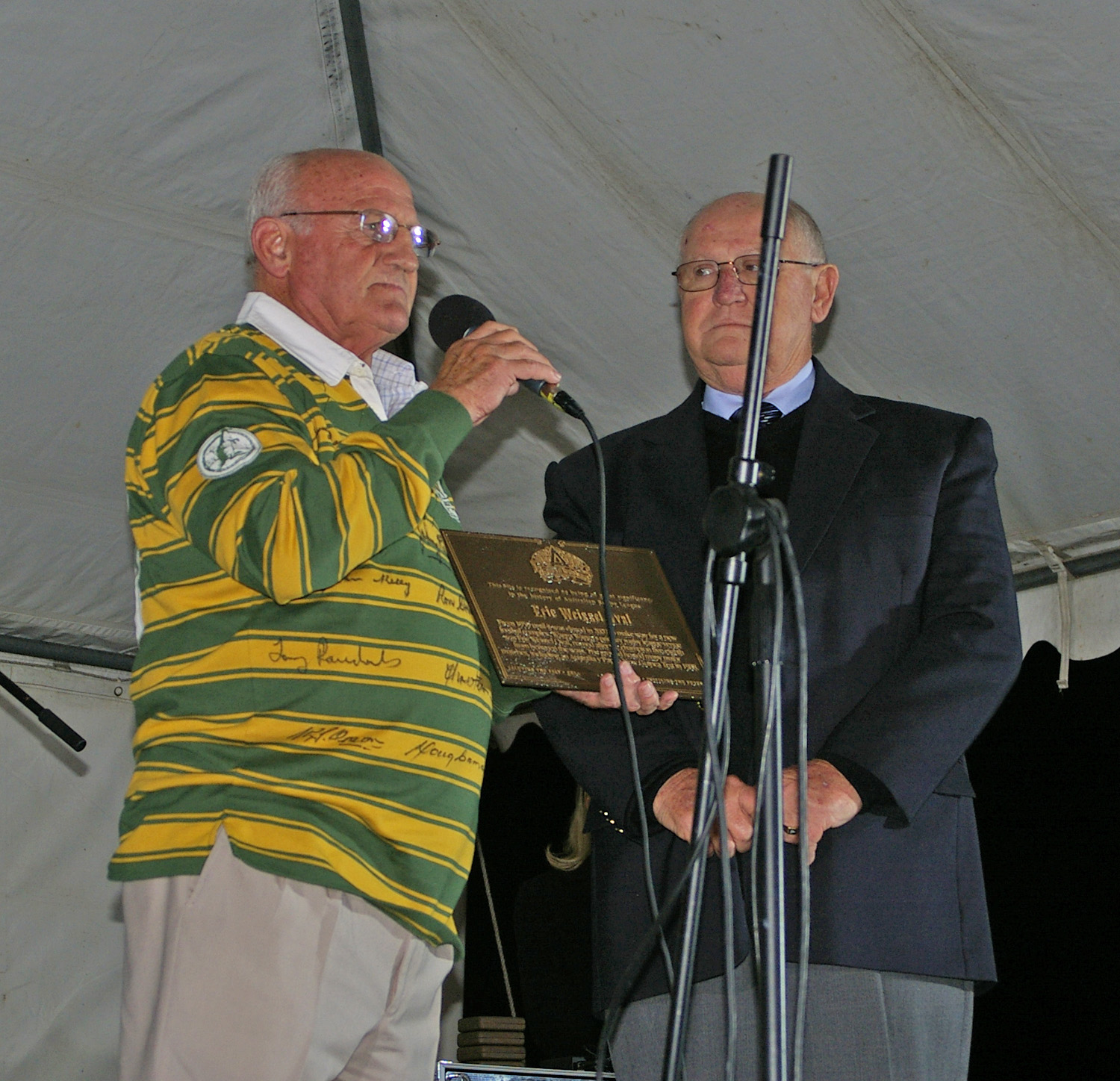
Centenary of Rugby League plaque

== See also ==
- List of sports venues named after individuals
