= Adam Perry =

Australian rugby league footballer

Personal information
- Full name: Adam Perry
- Born: 29 May 1979 (age 47) Junee, New South Wales, Australia

Playing information
- Height: 170 cm (5 ft 7 in)
- Weight: 97 kg (15 st 4 lb)
- Position: Hooker
Club
Years	Team	Pld	T	G	FG	P
1998–07	Canterbury Bulldogs	133	7	0	0	28

Adam Perry (born 29 May 1979) is a former professional rugby league footballer who played as a hooker in the 1990s and 2000s for Canterbury-Bankstown in the NRL, with whom he won the 2004 NRL premiership.

== Background ==
Perry was born in Junee, New South Wales, Australia of English descent.

== Playing career ==
Perry spent his entire nine-year first-grade career with Canterbury. Perry played for them in their 2004 NRL grand final victory over cross-town rivals, the Sydney Roosters. As 2004 NRL premiers, Canterbury faced Super League IX champions, Leeds in the 2005 World Club Challenge. Perry played at hooker in Canterbury's 32–39 loss.

Ongoing knee injuries forced Perry to retire from the NRL in 2007 at the age of 28. Perry was captain-coach of his home-town club Junee Diesels for two years in the Group 9 competition of the New South Wales Country Rugby League. Perry was a co-coach for Group 9 club Wagga Brothers and is also was a development officer with the CRL. Perry was assistant coach at the Gundagai Tigers in 2018 when they won the Group 9 premiership, and become head coach of that club from late September 2018.
