= Nick Skinner =

Australian rugby league footballer

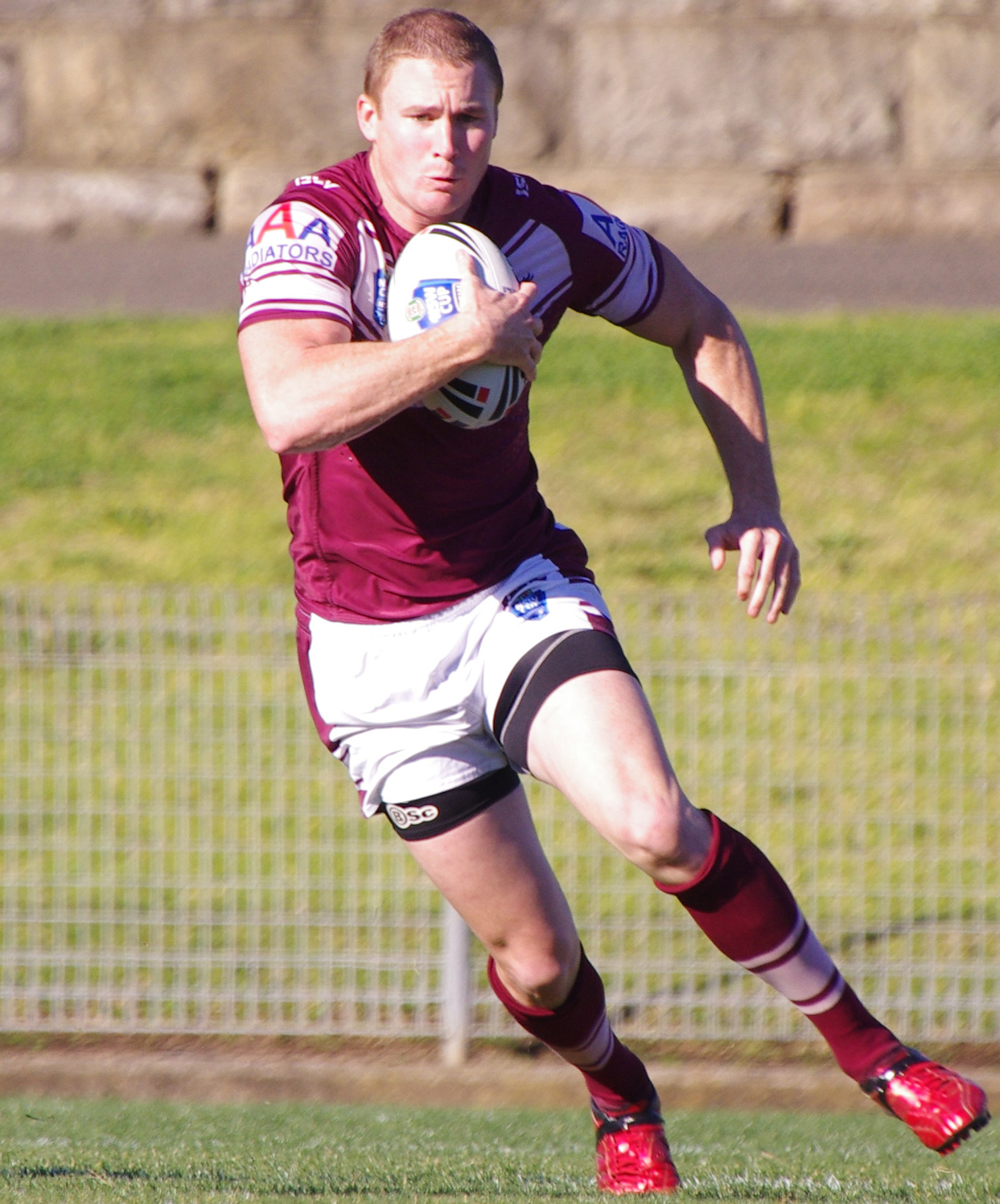

Personal information
- Full name: Nicholas Skinner
- Born: 6 May 1988 (age 36); Wagga Wagga, New South Wales, Australia

Playing information
- Height: 191 cm (6 ft 3 in)
- Weight: 103 kg (16 st 3 lb)
- Position: Prop, Second-row
Club
Years	Team	Pld	T	G	FG	P
2012–13	Manly Sea Eagles	6	1	0	0	4

Nick Skinner (born 6 May 1988) is a former professional rugby league footballer who last played for the Manly-Warringah Sea Eagles in the NRL. His choice of position was either Prop or Second-Row.

== Playing career ==
Skinner was signed by the Canberra Raiders for the 2008 season. He spent four years playing for Canberra's affiliate team in South Logan but could not make his way into Canberra's first-grade team.

At the end of the 2011 season, Skinner signed a two-year contract with Manly and made his NRL debut in Round 4 of 2012 against the St. George Illawarra Dragons. At the end of the 2013 season, after playing 6 first-grade games for Manly, Skinner announced his intention to return to the South City Bulls of the Group 9 Rugby League based in Wagga Wagga, citing his inability to play in the first-grade team on a consistent basis as the reason for returning to his junior club. Skinner captain-coached South City to back-to-back premierships in 2016 and 2017.
