= Albury Thunder =

Australian rugby league club based in Albury, New South Wales

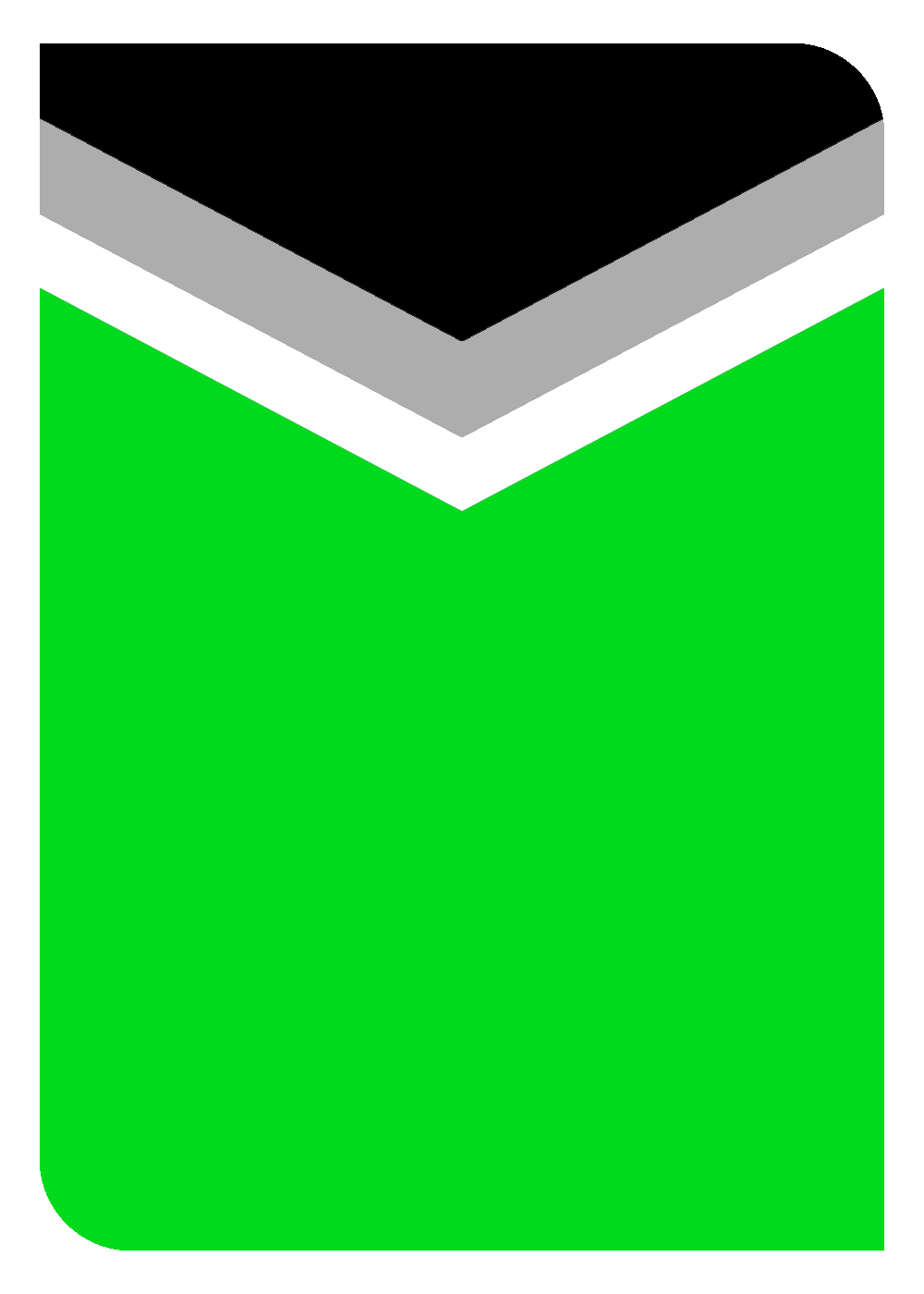

Club information
- Full name: Albury Thunder Rugby League Football Club
- Nickname: Thunder
- Colours: Black; Green
- Founded: 2011; 15 years ago (1934; 92 years ago as Albury Blues)

Current details
- Ground: Greenfield Park (5,000)
- Chairman: Rick O'Connell
- Coach: Etu Uaisele
- Captain: Lachy Munro, Paul Karaitiana, Nathan Darby
- Competition: Group 9 Rugby League (1992-present); Group 13 Rugby League (1934-1991)

Records
- Premierships: 11 (1958, 1974, 1975, 1978, 1979, 1980, 1988, 1989, 2012, 2013, 2014)
- Runners-up: 8 (1937, 1955, 1956, 1957, 1960, 1962, 1972, 1976)
- Minor premierships: 3 known (1975, 2012, 2013)
- Wooden spoons: 1 (2000)

The Albury Thunder are a rugby league team based in Albury, New South Wales, Australia. Founded in 1934 as the Albury Blues, the club has undergone several name changes and a move from Group 13 to Group 9 in 1992, eventually rebranding as the Thunder in 2011.

== History ==
=== Albury Blues era ===
The Albury Thunder were originally founded as the Albury Blues in 1934, playing in the Group 13 Rugby League competition, in which they won 8 titles in 1958, 1974, 1975, 1978, 1979, 1980, 1988 and 1989.

Then in 1991, Group 13 folded, and the Blues moved to Group 9.

=== Albury Southern Rams era ===
Upon joining Group 9, the club changed its name to the Albury Southern Rams to avoid a clash with the Tumut Blues club which was a foundation club of that competition. The club made one lower grade grand final under this moniker, the 1995 Under 16 decider, which it lost to former Group 13 rival Wagga Brothers.

=== Lavington Panthers era ===
In 2003, the club again underwent a rebrand, becoming the Lavington Panthers in an effort to align with the Lavington Sports Club (owners of the Lavington Blues AFL Club), which had recently been bought by the leagues club arm of NRL side Penrith Panthers. Around this time, members of the recently folded Albury Roos club, which joined the Goulburn Murray Rugby League following the demise of Group 13, joined the Panthers club in an effort to establish a single, more competitive Albury side in Group 9.

=== Albury Thunder era ===
In 2011, the club voted to return to being known as Albury Rugby League Football Club, to be more inclusive to the whole city of Albury, not just the suburb of Lavington. The club held a subsequent vote to determine a new moniker, with 'Thunder' beating out Titans, Pumas and Predators.

Shortly after being renamed, the Thunder won three premierships in 2012, 2013, and 2014, and were regular top-five finishers during their first decade under the new name.

The club won its first premiership in just their second season under the name, beating South City Bulls 36–26 at McDonald's Park in Wagga Wagga. In 2013, they again breezed through the season, with highlights including a 78–0 win over the Tumut Blues. This time, they faced the Gundagai Tigers in the Grand Final, and won 30-20, to secure back to back titles. The next season they again finished Minor Premiers, and again defeated South City in the Grand Final, winning 45–4 in front of over 4,000 people at McDonald's Park. This completed a threepeat, and the Thunder's only premiership titles to date. The club also made a finals appearance in 2016, where they made the second week before being eliminated.

From 2018 until 2020, the club was captain-coached by local junior and former NRL star Adrian Purtell. He was joined by fellow former NRL stars Etu Uaisele and Joel Monaghan. In 2022, he left to coach the Eden Tigers in the Group 16 Rugby League competition.

In 2023, the club was captain-coached by Purtell's former Canberra Raiders teammate and ex-Sydney Roosters winger Justin Carney. Uaisele took over the job upon Carney's departure in 2025, and remains the club's incumbent coach for the 2027 season.

== Honours ==
=== Group 13 Rugby League ===
Competed as Albury Blues.

Premierships: 1958, 1974, 1975, 1978, 1979, 1980, 1988 & 1989

=== Group 9 Rugby League ===
First Grade Premierships: 2012, 2013, 2014

Reserve Grade Premierships: 2010, 2011, 2012, 2026

League Tag Premierships: None

Women's Tackle Premierships: None

Under 18 Premierships: None

Under 16 Premierships: 2017

Weissel Medallists: Brett Gale (1993), Greg Lynch (2005), Lou Goodwin (2014)

John Hill Medallists: Willie Heta (2012, 2014), Mitch Davis (2013)

== Other historical Albury rugby league clubs ==
=== Albury Roos ===
The Albury Roos were formed in 1947 and competed in the Group 13 Rugby League competition, sharing Greenfield Park with their cross-town rivals the Albury Blues. The club won four first grade premierships in the competition, in 1948, 1957, 1970 and 1983, and finished runners-up in 1949, 1950, 1951, 1974, 1978, 1979 and 1981.

Following the demise of Group 13, the club joined the Goulburn Murray Rugby League in 1992, and went on to have further success, winning premierships in 1996 and 1998. The Roos then folded in 2000, with a number of the club's former players and administrators joining with the Albury Southern Rams, which became the Lavington Panthers in 2004, in an effort to create a stronger club in the Group 9 competition.

=== Albury Magpies (Teachers) ===
The Albury Magpies club, consisting primarily of teachers, was founded in 1970 and entered Group 13. The club played its home matches at Alexandra Park.

=== Albury Wanderers ===
Founded in 1946, the Albury Wanderers competed in the Group 13 competition. The club played its home matches at the CBC Oval.

=== Lavington RLFC ===
The Lavington Rugby League Club was formed in 1953. It competed in the Group 13 Zone 2 competition, which consisted of the reserves sides of larger clubs and first teams of smaller clubs, with rivals in the 1953 competition being Albury Roos, Bandiana, Henty, Lavington, Rand and The Rock. Coached by Ron Bartley and later Ron Purtell, the club reached the semi final in its inaugural season, losing 8-6 to The Rock, which went on to lose the grand final to premiers Bandiana.

== Notable Juniors/Players ==
- Justin Carney
- Dylan Edwards
- Lou Goodwin
- Ben Jeffery
- Joel Monaghan
- Adrian Purtell
- Etu Uaisele

== See also ==
- Goulburn Murray Rugby League
