= Junee Diesels =

Australian rugby league football club

Club information
- Full name: Junee Diesels Rugby League Football Club
- Nickname: Diesels
- Colours: Blue; Gold
- Founded: 1926

Current details
- Ground: Laurie Daley Oval, Willow Park
- CEO: David Holt
- Coach: Hayden Diggins & Daniel Foley
- Competition: Group 9 Rugby League

Records
- Premierships: 1964, 1986
- Runners-up: 1950, 1961, 2010, 2015

The Junee Rugby League Football Club, nicknamed the Diesels, is an Australian rugby league football club based in Junee, New South Wales. Formed in 1926, the club competes in the Group 9 Rugby League competition. The club also has an affiliate junior club.

== History ==
The club was formed in 1926, three years after the Group 9 competition.

The club has won two First Grade premierships in 1964 and 1986, and been runner up four times.

In 2021 and 2022, the club had no First Grade squad after player shortages and financial difficulties hit the club. However, the club returned to the field in 2023 with a new crop of local juniors filtering into First Grade throughout the season, and even hosted a famous Pie in the Sky match featuring many former National Rugby League players.

== Notable Juniors ==
- Laurie Daley (1987-2000 Canberra Raiders)
- Jason Lidden (1988-97 Western Suburbs Magpies, Canterbury Bulldogs & Penrith Panthers)
- Adam Perry (1998-2007 Canterbury Bulldogs)
- Michael Dobson (2006- Canberra Raiders, Newcastle, Catalans, Castleford, Wigan, Salford & Hull KR)
