= Group 13 Rugby League =

- Sport: Rugby league
- Formerly known as: Far South Rugby League; Group 18
- Instituted: 1934
- Ceased: 1991
- Country: Australia
- Most titles: Tumbarumba (11 titles)

The Group 13 Rugby league Competition is a defunct New South Wales Country Rugby League group competition which was run under the auspices of the Club Rugby League. It was disbanded after the 1991 Season. It covered an area comprising the southernmost parts of inland New South Wales and even some parts of Northern Victoria. The group was born from the Far South Rugby League and Wagga Rugby League, and was originally called Group 18 between 1934 and 1936.

The Far South Rugby League comprised Albury, Holbrook, Henty, Culcairn, Tumbarumba, The Rock and Yerong Creek whilst Wagga Rugby League comprised Wagga Magpies, Wagga Old Boys, Borambola, Farm and Militia.

Many towns and teams competed in Group 13 between 1934 and 1991. Four Grades were contested: First Grade, Reserve Grade, Under 18s and Under 16s. After the 1991 season, the remaining clubs joined the Group 9 Rugby League Competition or went into recess; many later ended up in the Victorian-administered Murray Cup.

== Teams ==
Group 13 Teams
Club	Year Entered	Home Ground	Championships	Moved to:
Competed in 1991 Season
Albury Blues	1934	Olive Street, CBC Oval & Greenfield Park	1958, 1974, 1975, 1978, 1979, 1980, 1988 & 1989	Changed name to Albury Southern Rams and entered Group 9 (became Albury Thunder)
Albury Roos	1947	Greenfield Park	1948 1957, 1970 & 1983	Entered Goulburn Murray Rugby Leaguein 1992, and won two premierships in 1996 and 1998. Folded in 2000.
Batlow Tigers	1935	Memorial Park	1954, 1972 & 1976	Merged with Adelong to form Adelong-Batlow Bears in Group 9
Ladysmith United	1982	Eric Weissel Oval, Wagga Wagga	None	Folded
Tumbarumba Greens	1934	Tumbarumba Showground	1934, 1937, 1946, 1953, 1971, 1973, 1977, 1985, 1986, 1987 & 1991	Group 9 in 1992
Wagga Wagga Brothers	1981	Eric Weissel Oval, Wagga Wagga	1981, 1982, 1984 & 1990	Joined after one season in Group 9 (1980), returned to Group 9 when Group 13 folded
Competed in Previous Seasons
Albury Wanderers	1946	CBC Oval	None	Disbanded
Albury Magpies (Teachers)	1970	Alexandra Park	None	Disbanded
Adelong Green & Gold	1937	Adelong Show Ground	1950, 1951, 1952, 1960 & 1961	Merged with Batlow to form Adelong-Batlow Bears in Group 9
Army	1969		None	Disbanded
Bandiana	1951		None	Disbanded
Borambola-Tarcutta	1938	Tarcutta Reserve	None	Disbanded
Corowa Cougars	1987	Airport Oval	None	Moved to Murray Cup
Culcairn	1946	Culcairn Sportsground	None	Disbanded
Gerogery (Reserve Grade)	1957	Gerogery Sportsground	None	Disbanded
Old Boys	1934	Wagga Cricket Ground	None	Disbanded
Gundagai Tigers	1938	Anzac Park	None	Moved to Group 9
Henty	1934	East Henty Ground	None	Disbanded
Holbrook Warriors	1934	Holbrook Football Ground	1940	Disbanded
Junee Diesels	1939	Loftus Oval	None	Moved to Group 9
Khancoban	1961	Khancoban Sportsground	1964	Disbanded
Lockhart	1936	Lockhart Sportsground	1947	Disbanded
Morven	1940	Morven Sportsground	None	Disbanded
RAAF	1968		None	Disbanded
Rand	1948	Rand Sportsground	None	Disbanded
Tarcutta	1935	Tarcutta Reserve	1962, 1965 & 1969	Disbanded
Teachers College	1949	Wagga Cricket Ground	None	Disbanded
The Rock	1937	Victoria Park	None	Disbanded
Tumut Blues	1938	Twickenham Oval	None	Group 9
Urana	1930s	Urana Sportsground	None	Competed in West Division of Far South Rugby League, Disbanded in late 1940s
Wagga Wagga Magpies	1934	Wagga Cricket Ground	1938 & 1939	Moved to Group 20, then Group 9
Wagga Wagga Waratahs	1935	Wagga Cricket Ground	1935, 1941	Disbanded
Wodonga Bears	Unknown	Unknown	None	Moved to Goulburn Murray Rugby League

== First Grade Champions ==
Season	Grand Finals				Minor Premiership
Season	Premiers	Score	Runners-up	Venue	Minor Premiership
1934	Tumbarumba	10–7	Wagga Wagga Magpies	Wagga Cricket Ground
1935	Wagga Wagga Waratahs	7–3	Tarcutta	Wagga Cricket Ground
1936	Tarcutta	15–9	Tumbarumba	Tarcutta Reserve
1937	Tumbarumba	20–7	Albury Blues	Wagga Cricket Ground
1938	Wagga Wagga Magpies	24–3	Holbrook	Holbrook
1939	Wagga Wagga Magpies	29–0	Holbrook	Wagga Cricket Ground
1940	Henty	8–8	Wagga Wagga Waratahs	Wagga Cricket Ground
1940 Replay	Henty	12–3	Wagga Wagga Waratahs	Wagga Cricket Ground
1941	Wagga Wagga Waratahs	2–2	Tumbarumba	Wagga Cricket Ground
1941 Replay	Wagga Wagga Waratahs	7–2	Tumbarumba	Wagga Cricket Ground
1942–1945 – No Competition
1946	Tumbarumba	5–0	Lockhart	Holbrook
1947	Lockhart	2–0	Tumbarumba	Wagga Cricket Ground
1948	Albury Roos	9–4	Borambola-Tarcutta	Holbrook
1949	Wagga RLFC	20–15	Albury Roos	Wagga Cricket Ground
1950	Adelong	19–4	Albury Roos	Holbrook
1951	Adelong	Draw	Albury Roos
1951 Replay	Adelong	9–4	Albury Roos	Holbrook
1952	Adelong	5–4	Holbrook	Greenfield Park, Albury
1953	Tumbarumba	22–14	Adelong	Memorial Park, Batlow
1954	Batlow	14–6	Adelong	Memorial Park, Batlow
1955	Holbrook	21–2	Albury Blues	Culcairn
1956	Holbrook	7–0	Albury Blues	Culcairn
1957	Albury Roos	11–2	Albury Blues	Greenfield Park, Albury
1958	Albury Blues	7–6	Holbrook	Culcairn
1959	Holbrook	10–5	Adelong	Culcairn
1960	Adelong	10–2	Albury Blues	Holbrook
1961	Adelong	32–10	Holbrook	Holbrook
1962	Tarcutta	10–5	Albury Blues	Holbrook
1963	Holbrook	15–2	Tarcutta
1964	Khancoban	10–5	Holbrook	Greenfield Park, Albury
1965	Tarcutta	5–0	Khancoban	Holbrook
1966	Army	19–8	Tarcutta	Holbrook
1967	Holbrook	10–7	Army	Greenfield Park, Albury
1968	Holbrook	15–7	Tarcutta	Greenfield Park, Albury
1969	Tarcutta	10–9	Army	Greenfield Park, Albury
1970	Albury Roos	9–7	Tarcutta	Lockhart
1971	Tumbarumba	16–4	Lockhart	Greenfield Park, Albury
1972	Batlow	10–5	Albury Blues	Holbrook
1973	Tumbarumba	13-9	Batlow	Adelong Show Ground
1974	Albury Blues	24–6	Albury Roos
1975	Albury Blues	17–5	Batlow
1976	Batlow	19–7	Albury Blues
1977	Tumbarumba	13–11	Adelong
1978	Albury Blues	31–16	Albury Roos
1979	Albury Blues	22–10	Albury Roos
1980	Albury Blues	26–10	Tumbarumba
1981	Wagga Brothers	9–2	Albury Roos	Tumbarumba Show Ground
1982	Wagga Brothers	17–10	Batlow
1983	Albury Roos	22–10	Tumbarumba
1984	Wagga Brothers	26–2	Batlow	Weissel Oval, Wagga
1985	Tumbarumba	32–8	Wagga Brothers
1986	Tumbarumba	21–4	Wagga Brothers
1987	Tumbarumba	12–10	Wagga Brothers	Weissel Oval, Wagga
1988	Albury Blues	28–8	Batlow	Weissel Oval, Wagga
1989	Albury Blues	16–7	Tumbarumba	Greenfield Park, Albury
1990	Wagga Brothers	36–6	Batlow	Tumbarumba Show Ground
1991	Tumbarumba	18–8	Batlow	Memorial Park, Batlow

== Clayton Cup Winners ==
Group 13 produced six teams that won the Clayton Cup (Country Rugby League) highest honour in Club Rugby League.

1939 – Wagga Magpies

1940 – Henty

1969 – Tarcutta

1975 – Albury Blues

1985 – Tumbarumba

1986 – Tumbarumba

== Roddy Shield ==
The Roddy Shield is a rugby league nines competition played in the vicinity of Tumut, New South Wales, Australia.

=== Clubs ===
==== Current ====
Town	Nickname	Home ground	Premiership Years
Adelong	Green & Gold	Adelong Showground	
Batlow	Tigers	Memorial Park, Batlow	
Tumut Bowling Club	Bears	Twickenham, Tumut	2018
Commercial Hotel	Sharks	Twickenham, Tumut	2019
Royal Hotel	Devils	Twickenham, Tumut	
Tumbarumba (Reserves)	Greens	Tumbarumba Showground	

==== Former ====
Town	Nickname	Home ground	Premiership Years
All-Stars	Stars	Twickenham, Tumut	
Oriental Hotel	Colts	Twickenham, Tumut	
Woolpack Hotel	Roosters/Jets	Twickenham, Tumut	

=== Premiers ===
Year	Winner	Score	Loser
2018	Tumut Bowling Club	21–10	Commercial Hotel
2019	Commercial Hotel	31–12	Oriental Hotel
2020	Woolpack Hotel (awarded with one round remaining due to COVID-19 pandemic)		
2021	Woolpack Hotel	11–10	Royal Hotel
2022	Adelong		Commercial Hotel
2023	Tumbarumba (Reserves)		
