= Jordan McLean =

Australia international rugby league footballer

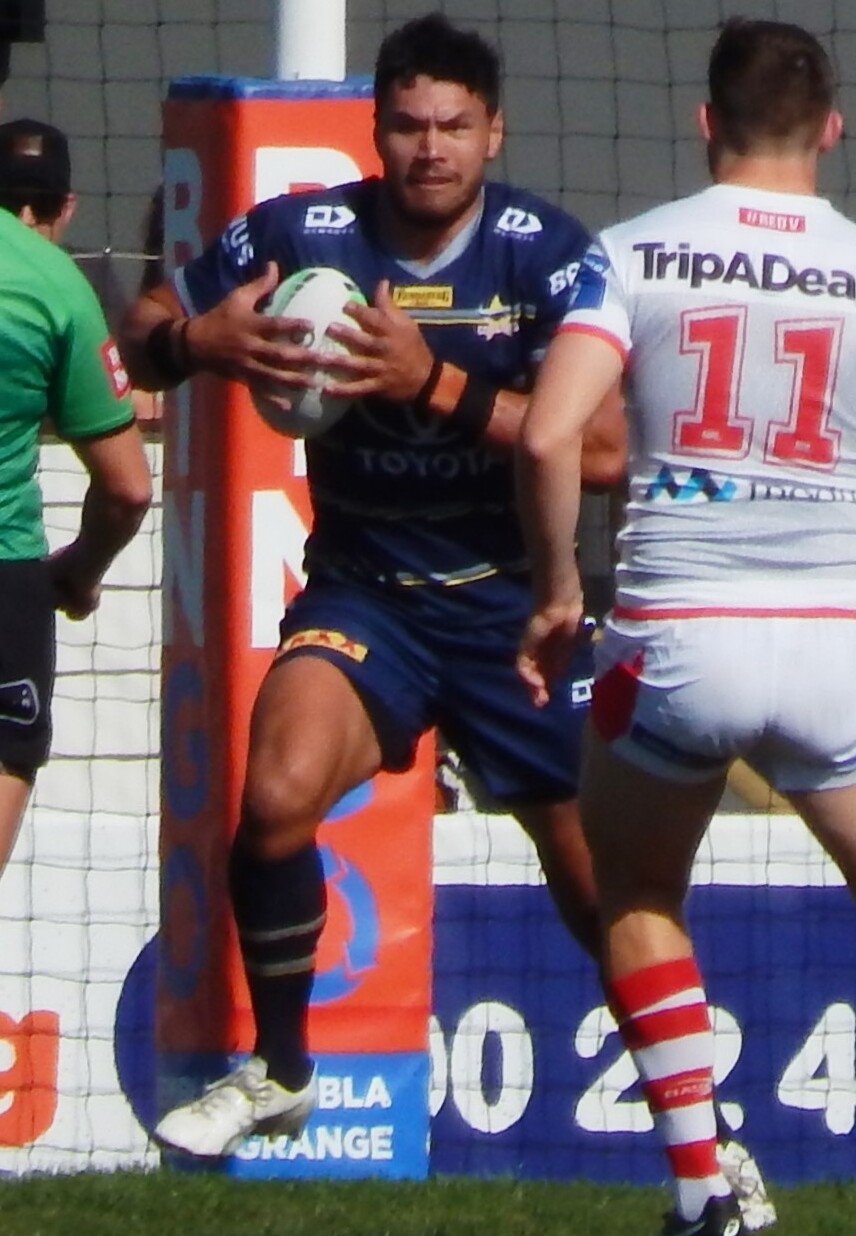

Personal information
- Full name: Jordan McLean
- Born: 8 October 1991 (age 35) Sydney, New South Wales, Australia

Playing information
- Height: 196 cm (6 ft 5 in)
- Weight: 118 kg (18 st 8 lb)
- Position: Prop
Club
| Years | Team | Pld | T | G | FG | P |
|---|---|---|---|---|---|---|
| 2013–17 | Melbourne Storm | 86 | 4 | 0 | 0 | 16 |
| 2018–25 | North Qld Cowboys | 156 | 6 | 0 | 0 | 24 |
| | Total | 242 | 10 | 0 | 0 | 40 |
Representative
| Years | Team | Pld | T | G | FG | P |
| 2016 | NSW Country | 1 | 0 | 0 | 0 | 0 |
| 2017 | World All Stars | 1 | 0 | 0 | 0 | 0 |
| 2017–18 | Australia | 8 | 0 | 0 | 0 | 0 |
| 2018 | Prime Minister's XIII | 1 | 0 | 0 | 0 | 0 |

Jordan McLean (born 8 October 1991) is an Australian former professional rugby league footballer who last played as a prop for the North Queensland Cowboys in the National Rugby League (NRL) and Australia at international level.

He has previously played for the Melbourne Storm in the NRL and was a member of the Storm's 2017 NRL Grand Final winning team. McLean was also part of Australia's 2017 Rugby League World Cup winning side and has played at representative level for NSW Country, World All Stars and the Prime Minister's XIII.

== Background ==
McLean was born in Sydney, New South Wales and is of Māori descent.

Jordan played his junior rugby league for the Young Cherrypickers and attended Young High School before being signed by the Canberra Raiders.

== Playing career ==
=== Early career ===
In 2007, McLean played for the Canberra Raiders Harold Matthews Cup team before joining the Melbourne Storm.

He played for Melbourne's NYC team from 2009 to 2011 and was a part of their 2009 NYC premiership winning team.

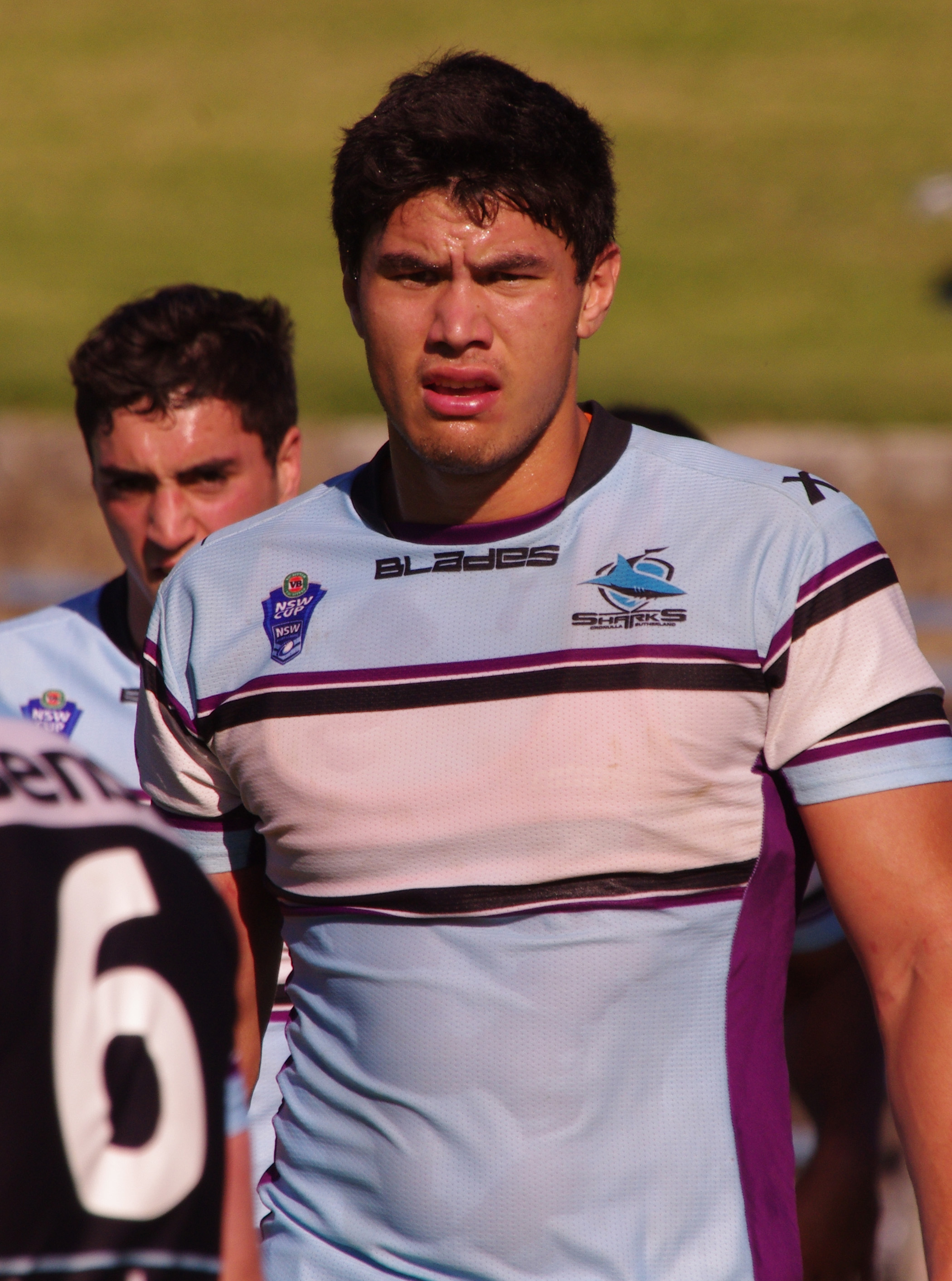
McLean playing for the Storm-Sharks combined team in 2013

=== 2013 ===
On 10 June 2013, McLean re-signed with the Melbourne side for a further three years, keeping him at the club until the end of the 2016 season. In Round 11 of the 2013 NRL season, McLean made his NRL debut for the Melbourne Storm against the Sydney Roosters at the SFS from the interchange bench in the clubs 26–18 win. In Round 23 against the Newcastle Knights at Hunter Stadium, McLean scored his first career try in Melbourne's 23–10 win. McLean finished his debut year in the NRL with him playing in 14 matches and scoring a try for the Melbourne outfit.

=== 2014 ===
In Round 3 of the 2014 NRL season the Melbourne club played the Newcastle Knights at a home game at AAMI Park in Melbourne's 28–20 win, shortly before half-time, McLean was involved in a 3-man tackle with team mates Jesse and Kenny Bromwich, where Newcastle forward Alex McKinnon subsequently suffered fractures to C4 and C5 vertebrae and was admitted to Melbourne's The Alfred Hospital and placed in a medically induced coma. Early reports were that McKinnon was unlikely to walk again. McLean expressed his sympathies to McKinnon through a Facebook post that read "Best wishes to Alex McKinnon, I genuinely hope you're alright and have a safe recovery". On 2 April, McLean appeared before the NRL Judiciary. McLean's lawyer Nick Ghabar, urged the panel to remove any emotion from the case and to exercise their common sense as former players, to accept the tackle was an accident, however, his client was given a seven-match suspension. A devastated McLean could not bear to look at numerous replays of the tackle. McLean returned to the Melbourne side in Round 14 against the Gold Coast Titans at Cbus Super Stadium, playing in the Storm's 24–20 win. He finished off the 2014 season having played in 16 matches and scoring three tries for Melbourne.

=== 2015 ===
On 24 March 2015, McLean re-signed with Melbourne for a further three years, keeping him at the club to the end of the 2018 season. McLean finished off the 2015 season having played in 15 matches for the Melbourne club.

=== 2016 ===
On 8 May 2016, McLean played for New South Wales Country against New South Wales City, playing off the interchange bench in the 44–30 loss in Tamworth. On 2 October 2016, in Melbourne's 2016 NRL Grand Final against the Cronulla-Sutherland Sharks, McLean started at prop in the 14–12 defeat. McLean finished the 2016 NRL season with him playing in 21 matches for the Melbourne outfit.

=== 2017 ===
On 10 February 2017, McLean played for the World All Stars against the Indigenous All Stars in the 2017 All Stars match, starting at prop in the 34–8 loss at Hunter Stadium. On 20 March 2017, McLean signed with the North Queensland Cowboys on a three-year deal, starting in 2018. In May 2017, McLean was named as 18th man for Australia in the 2017 ANZAC Test match against New Zealand and for New South Wales for Game 1 of the 2017 State of Origin series. On 1 October 2017, in Melbourne's 2017 NRL Grand Final against the North Queensland Cowboys, McLean started at prop in the 34–6 victory against his future club. McLean finished his last year with the Melbourne Storm with him playing in 20 matches in the 2016 NRL season.

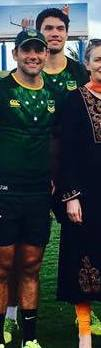
McLean representing Australia in 2017

On 3 October 2017, McLean was rewarded for his big season by being selected in the 24-man Kangaroos squad for the 2017 Rugby League World Cup. McLean played in all 6 matches of the tournament including starting at prop in the Kangaroos 6–0 gritty win against England in the World Cup Final at Suncorp Stadium.

=== 2018 ===
In Round 1 of the 2018 NRL season, McLean made his club debut for the North Queensland Cowboys against the Cronulla-Sutherland Sharks, starting at prop in the 20–14 win at 1300SMILES Stadium. In Round 2 against the Brisbane Broncos in the Queensland derby match, Mclean scored his first club try for North Queensland in the 24–20 loss at Suncorp Stadium. In the Cowboys' Round 4 loss to the Penrith Panthers, McLean suffered a foot injury, sidelining him for four months. He returned from injury in North Queensland's Round 20 win over the Newcastle Knights.

Following a strong finish to the season, McLean was recalled to the Australian squad for their end of season Test matches against New Zealand and Tonga. On 6 October, he represented the Prime Minister's XIII in their win over the PNG Prime Minister's XIII side.

=== 2019 ===
On 8 March 2019, McLean was named vice-captain of the North Queensland side. He played 22 games for the club in 2019, starting all 22 at prop. In Round 4, he played his 100th NRL game in North Queensland's 12–30 loss to the Canberra Raiders. In Round 13, he sustained a hamstring injury in North Queensland's loss to the Manly-Warringah Sea Eagles. The injury dashed his hopes of replacing the injured David Klemmer in the New South Wales Game 2 side. He returned to the North Queensland line up in Round 15, missing just one game. On 18 September, he won the Cowboys' 2019 Players' Player award at the club's presentation night.

=== 2020 ===
McLean played 15 games for the North Queensland club in 2020, starting all 15 at prop, and captaining the side four times. He missed five games due to a calf injury.

=== 2022 ===
On 19 June, McLean was selected by New South Wales for game two of the 2022 State of Origin series in the extended squad. McLean was then selected by coach Brad Fittler to make his State of Origin debut as starting prop for game 3. With just days remaining before the series decider, McLean was ruled out of the match with a hamstring injury. McLean played 22 matches for North Queensland in the 2022 NRL season as the club finished third on the table and qualified for the finals. He played in both finals matches including their preliminary final loss to Parramatta.

=== 2023 ===
McLean played 22 matches for North Queensland in the 2023 NRL season as the club finished 11th on the table.

=== 2024 ===
He played 22 games for North Queensland in the 2024 NRL season as they finished 5th on the table. McLean played in both finals games for North Queensland as they were eliminated in the second week by Cronulla. On 15 November, the North Queensland outfit announced that McLean had signed a one-year extension with the club.

=== 2025 ===
On 27 August, McLean announced his retirement from the NRL. He stated that he would retire immediately after North Queensland's round 26 match against Brisbane in the Queensland derby.

== Post playing ==
On 3 November 2025, the Cowboys announced that McLean would join the transition team for the teams Under 20s players who care coming through the grades.

== Achievements and accolades ==
=== Individual ===
- North Queensland Cowboys Players' Player of the Year: 2019

=== Team ===
- 2017 NRL Grand Final: Melbourne Storm – Winners
- 2017 Rugby League World Cup: Australia – Winners

== Statistics ==
| Season | Team | Matches | T | G | GK % | F/G | Pts |
|---|---|---|---|---|---|---|---|
| 2013 | Melbourne | 14 | 1 | 0 | – | 0 | 4 |
| 2014 | Melbourne | 16 | 3 | 0 | – | 0 | 12 |
| 2015 | Melbourne | 15 | 0 | 0 | – | 0 | 0 |
| 2016 | Melbourne | 21 | 0 | 0 | – | 0 | 0 |
| 2017 | Melbourne | 20 | 0 | 0 | – | 0 | 0 |
| 2018 | North Queensland | 10 | 2 | 0 | – | 0 | 0 |
| 2019 | North Queensland | 22 | 1 | 0 | — | 0 | 4 |
| 2020 | North Queensland | 15 | 0 | 0 | — | 0 | 0 |
| 2021 | North Queensland | 24 | 1 | 0 | | | 4 |
| 2022 | North Queensland | 22 | 0 | 0 | | | |
| 2023 | North Queensland | 22 | 1 | | | | 4 |
| 2024 | North Queensland | 22 | 1 | | | | 4 |
| 2025 | North Queensland | 19 | | | | | |
| Career totals | | 242 | 10 | 0 | — | 0 | 40 |

=== International ===
| † | Denotes seasons in which McLean won a World Cup |

| Season | Team | Matches | T | G | GK % | F/G | Pts |
|---|---|---|---|---|---|---|---|
| 2017† | Australia | 6 | 0 | 0 | — | 0 | 0 |
| 2018 | Australia | 2 | | | | | |
| Career totals | | 8 | 0 | 0 | — | 0 | 0 |
