= Jason Lidden =

Australian rugby league footballer (born 1969)

Personal information
- Born: 24 April 1969 (age 57) Sydney, New South Wales

Playing information
- Position: Centre, Five-eighth, Second-row, Lock
Club
Years	Team	Pld	T	G	FG	P
1988–93	Western Suburbs	108	9	1	0	38
1994–95	Penrith Panthers	25	2	0	0	8
1996	Canterbury Bulldogs	13	1	0	0	4
1997	Castleford Tigers	24	7	0	0	28
	Total	170	19	1	0	78

Jason Lidden (born 24 April 1969) is an Australian former professional rugby league footballer who played for the Western Suburbs Magpies, Penrith Panthers, Canterbury-Bankstown Bulldogs and the Castleford Tigers.

== Club career ==
A Junee Diesels junior, Lidden made his début with Wests in round 6 of 1988, playing five-eighth. He maintained his position in the side for the remainder of the season, switching between five-eighth and centre, and filled a similar role for three years.

With the arrival of new coach Warren Ryan and players Paul Langmack, Andrew Farrar and David Gillespie in 1991, Lidden was moved to the forwards, but played five-eighth in that year's semi-finals, the club's first appearance for many years. Lidden was noted as, "one of the big improvers in '91. The Junee Diesel played in every game for the Magpies and was one of the Winfield Cup's most under-rated performers." The club made the semis again in 1992 and Lidden stayed with the club for one further season.

Lidden joined Penrith in 1994, either starting in the back row or on the bench. He only played 7 games in 1995, before joining Canterbury for one season, where he played mainly from the bench. For a period, he was dropped from first grade and captained the reserve grade side.

In 1997, Lidden spent a season overseas with the Castleford Tigers on a one-year contract, playing 24 games and scoring 7 tries. In 1999, he returned to coach the Junee Diesels for a season.

Lidden was later named as a centre in the Magpies' Team of the Eighties.

== External sources ==
- Whiticker, Alan and Hudson, Glen; The Encyclopedia of Rugby League Players; published 2005 by BAS publishing, f16/171 Collins St, Melbourne, Vic., 3000
