= Jed Reardon =

Australian rugby league footballer (born 2005)

Personal information
- Born: 31 March 2005 (age 21)

Playing information
- Position: Centre, Second-row
Club
Years	Team	Pld	T	G	FG	P
2026–	Canterbury Bulldogs	2	0	0	0	0
- Source: RLP

Jed Reardon (born 31 March 2005) is an Australian rugby league footballer for the Canterbury-Bankstown Bulldogs in the National Rugby League (NRL).

Reardon comes from Temora, New South Wales, and is a son of former Bulldogs forward Steve Reardon. He attended St Gregory's College in Campbelltown, Sydney.

A Temora Dragons product, Reardon was with the Canberra Raiders as a junior and joined the Bulldogs in 2023, featuring in a Jersey Flegg premiership-winning team the following season.

Reardon, a centre and second-rower, made two appearances for the Bulldogs in the 2026 NRL season, making his first-grade debut off the bench during the second half of their round 12 win over the Melbourne Storm.
