= Peter Spring =

Australian rugby league footballer

Personal information
- Full name: Peter Spring
- Born: 30 May 1962 (age 63)

Playing information
- Position: Prop
Club
| Years | Team | Pld | T | G | FG | P |
|---|---|---|---|---|---|---|
| 1986–88 | Illawarra Steelers | 29 | 2 | 0 | 0 | 8 |
| 1989–91 | St. George Dragons | 24 | 0 | 0 | 0 | 0 |
| 1991–92 | Hull FC | 18 | 0 | 0 | 0 | 0 |
| | Total | 71 | 2 | 0 | 0 | 8 |
- Source: As of 3 February 2023

Peter Spring nicknamed "Cockie" is an Australian former professional rugby league footballer who played in the 1980s and 1990s. He played for Illawarra and St. George in the NSWRL competition. He also played for Hull FC in England.

== Playing career ==
Spring made his first grade debut for Illawarra in round 10 of the 1986 NSWRL season against Western Suburbs at WIN Stadium. Spring would make six appearances for Illawarra in his debut season as the club finished bottom of the table and claimed the Wooden Spoon. Spring would go on to play 29 games for Illawarra over three seasons scoring two tries.

In 1989, Spring joined St. George and made his club debut in round 7 against eventual premiers Canberra at Seiffert Oval. Spring would play a total of 24 matches for St. George. In 1991, Spring joined English side Hull F.C. where he played one season.
