= Luke Davico =

Australian rugby league footballer

Personal information
- Born: 16 May 1973 (age 53) Gosford, New South Wales, Australia

Playing information
- Height: 1.86 m (6 ft 1 in)
- Weight: 109 kg (17 st 2 lb)
- Position: Prop
Club
| Years | Team | Pld | T | G | FG | P |
|---|---|---|---|---|---|---|
| 1994–04 | Canberra Raiders | 176 | 16 | 0 | 0 | 66 |
| 2006–07 | Newcastle Knights | 18 | 2 | 0 | 0 | 8 |
| | Total | 194 | 18 | 0 | 0 | 74 |

Luke Davico (born 16 May 1973) is an Australian former professional rugby league footballer of Italian descent. He previously played for the Canberra Raiders (where he was named the club's rookie of the year in 1995) and the Newcastle Knights.

== Background ==
Davico was born in Gosford, New South Wales.

== Playing career ==
Davico made his first-grade debut two days before his 21st birthday in round ten of the 1994 season. He started from the bench in a match against the St. George Dragons.

After eleven seasons with the Canberra Raiders, Davico signed a contract with English Super League club, Wigan Warriors. A torn pectoral muscle during a match in August, 2004, prematurely ended his time with the Canberra club. Davico then re-injured the muscle five minutes into a pre-season match for Wigan in January, 2005.

Davico returned to Australia without having played a first-grade game for Wigan. In 2006, Davico signed a two-year contract with the Newcastle Knights. Following seventeen appearances from the bench in 2006 and only one in 2007, Davico retired mid-season.
