= Wade Shire =

Former local government area in New South Wales, Australia

Wade Shire, also known as Griffith Shire Council from 1981-1987, was a Municipal council in New South Wales, Australia. Centred around the town of Griffith, the council was abolished in 1987 with the creation of the City of Griffith.

== Towns and villages ==
- Griffith (Council seat)
- Beelbangera
- Bilbul
- Hanwood
- Lake Wyangan
- Nericon
- Tharbogang
- Widgelli
- Wilbriggie
- Yenda
- Yoogali
