= Roger Jose =

Australian hermit (c. 1893 – 1963)

Roger Jose at Borroloola, 1956

Roger and Maggie Jose, Borroloola, c1933

Roger Jose (c. 1893 – 7 October 1963) was a hermit and labourer who spent much of his life in Borroloola in the Northern Territory of Australia. He was a self-acknowledged eccentric and one of the region's most famous outback characters.

== Life in the Northern Territory ==
Little is known of Jose's early life and it is thought he was likely born in New South Wales, but details of who his family were are unknown.

It is known that Jose arrived in Borroloola in 1916 after having walked there from Cunnamulla in Queensland. This is a distance of more than 2,200 kilometres (1,400 mi). After first arriving in the region Jose began working for various cattle station in the region where he was primarily employed working on fences and building yards; he also worked maintaining the track between Borroloola and Anthony's Lagoon.

In the 1920s he spent a period of time living in Darwin where he married Maggie, a Marranunggu woman from the Adelaide River region. Maggie died in the 1950s and after her death Jose married her sister Biddy.

From the 1930s Jose begun to rarely leave his home at Borroloola, which was constructed out of a corrugated iron tank (which was 5,000 liters (1,300 U.S. gal)) with a roof and holes for windows and a door. In this way he became a well-known and celebrated hermit who met with and was interviewed by many passing through the region. During this period he lived a very isolated life and lived at subsistence level, surviving off snakes, yams, lily roots and birds (he refused to eat pelicans); he was also known to be a heavy drinker and his drinks of choice were rum and methylated spirits.

He dressed distinctly and often wore wallaby hide slippers, a tea cosy for a hat and a heavy coat which he claimed helped 'keep out the hot air' in the tropical region. Despite his hermit status he lived in close contact with the local Yanyuwa people.

He read most of the town's small library collection before the library was closed and would often quote from Shakespeare and the Bible, despite being an atheist. He also wrote his own poetry, which was never published. Jose also wrote frequent letters to the editor of The Northern Standard.

In 1933 Jose was featured in an article written by Ernestine Hill entitled "The last of the Beachcombers" in which she frequently compares him to Bill Harney and says that:

As the last of the beach-combers, men who in a generation of clerks and salesmen can yet wrest their living from sheer wilderness, richly do they deserve to be... The most extraordinary feature in the extraordinary lives of these men is that they have practically dispensed with civilisation.

— Ernestine Hill, The last of the beachcombers, Sunday Mail (Brisbane), 30 July 1933

In 1962 Jose was interviewed by David Attenborough and featured in an episode of Quest Under Capricorn called "Hermits of Borroloola". This episode was first broadcast in 1963.

He was the subject of a song "Roger was no death adder" by Ted Egan.

He died at his home on 7 October 1963 and was survived by his wife Biddy.

== See also ==
- Michael 'Tarzan' Fomenko (c.1930–2018), a hermetic bushman who lived in Queensland
- David Glasheen (d. 2025), a former mining tycoon who decided to live a solitary existence on an island in Far North Queensland
- Valerio Ricetti (1898–1952), an Italian-Australian hermit who lived mainly in a cave in the Griffith area of New South Wales for a period of 23 years
