= Valerio Ricetti =

Italian-Australian hermit (1898–1952)

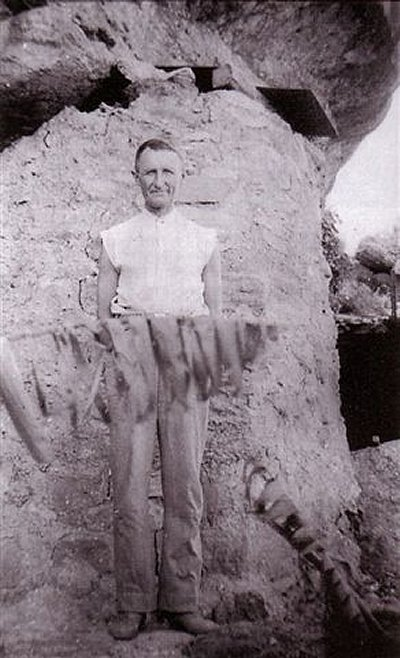
- Valerio Ricetti in 1938
- Born: 4 October 1898; Sondalo, Italy
- Died: 1952 (aged 53); Sondalo, Italy
- Occupations: Hermit, artisan - dry stone walling

Valerio Ricetti (Italian pronunciation: [vaˈlɛːrjo riˈtʃetti]; 4 October 1898 – 1952) was an Italian-Australian hermit who lived mainly in a cave in the Griffith area for a period of 23 years. Working only at night and in the early morning hours so that he would not be seen, he turned the cave into his own private "utopia" complete with kitchen, chapel, landscaping, pathways, stone walls, stone stairs, paths, terraced gardens and cisterns for water supply.

== Biography ==
=== Early life in Italy ===
Valerio Ricetti was born in Sondalo, a municipality in the Province of Sondrio in the Italian region of Lombardy which is a part of the Italian Alps, close to the border of Switzerland, and located about 130 km northeast of Milan and about 40 km northeast of Sondrio. Although Ricetti informed his lifelong friend Petronio Ceccato that he was born on 4 October 1898 he did at times adjust his date of birth so as to either get work, or receive adult pay rates. From that perspective while there is no actual birth record available there are other records related to his later dealings with police in Australia which in detail given by him state that his date of birth was 12 March 1897.

As a young teenager he was apprenticed to become a stonemason and concrete worker, learning his trade in road and rail tunnel construction. Ricetti had always wanted to come to Australia and he was saving money for the trip. His uncle, who had noted the impending war (which became World War I), suggested he migrate to Australia before all passenger shipping was cancelled, and then lent him the money to travel.

=== Early life in Australia ===
Ricetti arrived at Port Pirie, South Australia in October 1914, just as he turned 16 years of age, working there for some months before moving to the mining town of Broken Hill and finding work there. In Broken Hill he stayed at a boarding house owned by Valentino and Elisabeth Ceccato. Valentino helped Ricetti get a job at the mine where he worked. The mine was owned by Francesco Bicego. He learned to speak English very well, and he could already speak Italian, German and French. Ricetti worked in the Broken Hill area until 1918, leaving heartbroken because a barmaid whom he intended to marry had spurned his love.

Returning to South Australia he worked in various jobs for several years and a certain level of frugality allowed him to save a year's wages, which he had in his pocket when he visited a brothel in the city. He left the brothel somewhat absentmindedly leaving his wallet and its contents behind. When he returned for his wallet, the establishment's pimp refused to let him back in and in his anger he threw a rock through one of the windows. The police were called, and a chase saw him captured and sentenced to time in Adelaide Gaol.

When he was released he left South Australia to spend time in Victoria. While in Melbourne he tried to pawn his one remaining possession, a coat. Ricetti fell foul to a scandalous passer-by who pretended to assist but instead disappeared with the piece of clothing.

Moving then to Burrinjuck, New South Wales in 1928, Ricetti managed to get some work as a sailor on the Mary Anne, a paddle steamer that worked the Murray River, Murrumbidgee River and Lachlan River. As a part of his travels he followed the Murrumbidgee downstream to the Lachlan then upstream to Hillston, New South Wales. From Hillston he walked, with no fixed destination, along the railway line arriving at the fringes of Griffith where a rainstorm forced him to find shelter. Next day exploring where he had stayed the night he found a huge overhanging rock which formed a dry, cave-like area. Nearby there were two reservoirs full of water, fruit and vegetable farms and a rubbish dump which not only had plenty of rabbits, but where he found a shovel, pick head, and axe head for which he made handles from nearby tree branches.

Valerio's uncle, Bortolo Ricetti, had travelled to Australia in the 1880s. Bortolo came to Australia during the gold rush era seeking his fortune. He eventually went to Broken Hill where he mined for opals for a while, then he worked out that he could earn more money by opening a boarding house for other miners. He did well, then in the early 1900s he heard that land was being sold off cheaply in North Queensland to encourage new farming. He sold up and moved to Innisfail, North Queensland, where he established a successful sugarcane farm. Bortolo returned to Italy (Tirano, his birthplace) and with the impending WWI looming, he encouraged his nephews to leave Italy and travel to Australia. Bortolo passed on his sugarcane farm to his eldest nephew, Giacomo (Jack) Bombardieri (his sister's son) and his younger brother Bortolo (Bob) Bombardieri. Jack came to Australia around 1914, followed by his brother Bob in 1920. Valerio would have been told to travel to North Queensland to meet up with his other cousin Jack, however it seems as though he disembarked in Port Pirie SA by mistake, and his sole adventures began. His uncle Bortolo would have also mentioned Broken Hill, where Valerio went to earlier on.

=== Creating a Utopia in a cave ===
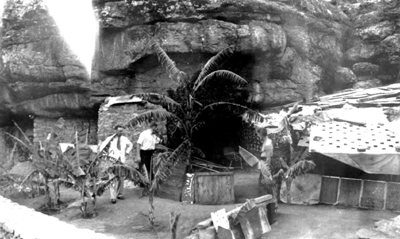
Hermit Cave complex in 1936

Deciding to stay on the hill and unaware that his old Italian colleagues, Ceccato and Bicego, had settled down nearby, Ricetti believed himself to be the only Italian in the area and so he kept entirely to himself, living in the cave as a home. His need for reclusiveness saw him keep a couple of places to hide in the event of people coming by and for one of these he built a stone walled circular cave around a large tree that had a peephole in it. This hideout was set amongst shrubs so that he could hide without being spotted but keep watch until the people had left.

His industrious nature assisted by his background in dry stone walling saw him clear the site and create massive stone galleries, pathways, cliff side gardens, and floral painted rock walls. By hand Ricetti moved hundreds of tons of rock over a number of years without anyone in the area ever becoming aware of his presence. During this time he lived off the land – no doubt by scavenging from the tip, as well as the vegetable and fruit gardens nearby.

In 1935, after he had been in the location for six years Ricetti had a fall breaking a leg and badly bruising his ribs. Luckily he was found by a passing swagman who notified an ambulance, and he was taken to the nearby Griffith hospital and treated by Dr E W Burrell.

It was this accident and the requirement to provide an address to the authorities that moved him from a state of reclusive obscurity to that of instant celebrity partly because of his hermit nature but particularly when the sheer size of his work at the cave was discovered.

Following his recuperation in hospital, he returned to his cave and Ricetti, without any money but anxious to pay Dr Burrell for his services sneaked into town at night and worked secretly in the Doctor's garden. Dr Burrell caught him after a few visits and informed Ricetti that he was Government Medical Officer and that payment was not required. Even so, the two became good friends with the doctor visiting him at his cave home regularly bringing gifts of things such as shoes and clothes.

Two years later, Ricetti learned through the visit of a Mr Agostini (another Italian in the community) that his old friends Ceccato and Bicego were in that same town and their friendship was renewed. They would pick him up on weekends to meet other people and while Ricetti became more sociable and they attempted to coax him from his reclusiveness he continued to live in his cave.

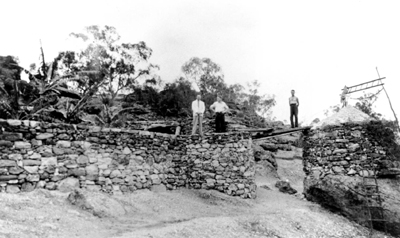
Dry stone walling at the Hermit's Cave complex

==== Complexity of Ricetti’s cave ====
After he was found it was learned that Ricetti had used the traditional artisan skill of dry stone walling, which he had learned during his apprenticeship in his North Italian homeland, creating what he referred to as his Garden of Eden. Ricetti's work, completed totally on his own, covers 160,000 square metres of rocky ridge atop Scenic Hill, using the natural landscape and materials found in the area to create a hermitage that stretched for over a kilometre.

=== World War II internment ===
With the arrival of World War II state authorities put in place the requirement for enemy aliens to register under the National Security (Aliens Control) Regulations, report to the local police station each week, and carry an identity card at all times. Ricetti was arrested on 4 March 1942 for failing to register and failing to report. His statement that he was unaware of the requirements was accepted by the local police, and the local police Officer-in-Charge reported that he did not have a concern with Ricetti, noting that he was a "harmless mental deficient who lives the life of a hermit".

Military Police Intelligence of Sydney had different views however and demanded a search be conducted by local police of his cave premises. However they found no "literature of subversive or disloyal nature" or any "prohibited possessions". Nevertheless, it was alleged that Ricetti had lined the walls of one of his caves with newspaper reports concerning Hitler which had a swastika prominently displayed. Ricetti was interviewed by Military Police who noted that he lived "in the highest and most secluded locality in the District ... about a mile from the various petrol depots, electricity substations and water channels in the Irrigation Area" and that he was "known to wander about at night" and it was decided that he should be interned. He was arrested on 3 May 1942 at his cave and moved to Liverpool Prisoners of War and Internment Camp and then transferred to Cowra Internment Camp and then transferred to Loveday Internment Camp, South Australia on 21 April 1943. Part of his internment duties included building roads in the area and with his skills he was able to assist guards with ways to improve their road-building methods.

Ricetti was released eight months later, taken to Sydney and there nominated his place of abode (as part of the register requirements) as Farm 219 Yoogali, Griffith which was the Ceccato farm. A year later on 30 November 1944, he officially nominated the location of Crown Reserve (now called Scenic Hill) – the place of his cave as his place of abode.

No one is absolutely sure if Ricetti lived in the cave exclusively from that time although for the rest of World War II it is likely that he was not allowed to live back in his cave. It is known that he worked on Valentino Ceccato's farm until 1948, and then on the farm of Valentino's son. Ricetti is said to have always been a loner, working away from others and as necessary sleeping in the pruning shed.

=== Death and legacy ===
Despite being employed by old friends at Griffith and becoming more sociable, Ricetti apparently was troubled by an illusion of "a man and a woman in the sky" who demanded that he do more and more work to his cave utopia.

By May 1952, he was in bad health but he had saved £1400 which allowed him to return to Italy, partly with the intention of seeing his brother with whom he had hitherto lost contact. It is clear that he intended to return to Australia because he purchased a return ticket and left his savings in the local bank.

In November 1952, Bruno Ceccato (son of Valentino Ceccato) received a notice from the Municipality of Sondrio Valtellina that Ricetti had died.

Ricetti's cave home became known as Hermit's Cave and has now been preserved with a listing on the State Heritage Register.

== See also ==
- Michael 'Tarzan' Fomenko (c.1930–2018), a hermetic bushman who lived in Queensland
- David Glasheen (d. 2025), a former mining tycoon who decided to live a solitary existence on an island in Far North Queensland
- Roger Jose (1893-1963), a hermit and labourer who spent much of his life in Borroloola in the Northern Territory

== Sources ==
- Caillard, Bobby (2005). Recovering the Lost Landscape of Valerio Ricetti: the archaeology of an individual ((Honors) thesis, Vol. 1). University of Sydney. pp. 28–34.
- Fenwick, W. H (3 February 1977). "His Eden Blossomed on an Alien Hill". The Area News. pp. 8–9.
- Kabaila, Peter (2005). Griffith Heritage. pp. 105–108. (OCLC 63764797)
