= Yellow Tail (wine) =

Australian wine brand

The Yellow Tail logo seen on all advertising

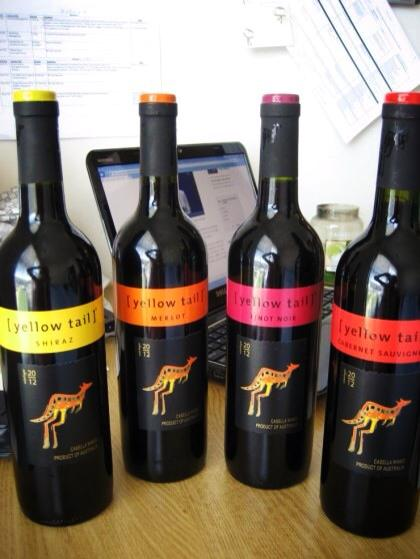
Yellow Tail wine

Yellow Tail (stylised [ yellow tail ]) is an Australian brand of wine produced by Casella Family Brands. Yellow Tail, as well as Casella Family Brands as a whole, are both based in Yenda, New South Wales.

== History ==
In 1957, the Casella family, headed by Filippo Casella and his wife Maria, emigrated from Sicily to Australia.

Yellow Tail was developed for the Casella family winery to enter into the bottled wine market—having previously supplied bulk wine to other wineries. The Yellow Tail brand was developed in 2000 and was originally produced for the export market. It became the number one imported wine to the United States in 2011.

The namesake of the brand, Yellow Tail, is the yellow-footed rock wallaby (Petrogale xanthopus), a relative of kangaroos.

== Vineyard ==
The vineyard produces approximately three percent of all wine and is around 540 acres (220 ha), located in the Riverina, Griffith, New South Wales, Australia.

== Wines ==
Approximately a third of the grapes that are harvested by Yellow Tail are from their vineyard in Riverina, Australia. The rest are from other vineyards in South Eastern Australia. All Yellow Tail wines have their own specific label colour. In addition to sparkling wines, Yellow Tail makes varietal wine from the following grape varieties: Moscato, Riesling, Sémillon, Sauvignon blanc, Pinot gris, Chardonnay, Pinot noir, Merlot, Grenache, Shiraz and Cabernet sauvignon in addition to some blended wine and rosé. Each wine has different label colours; for example, the merlot label is Orange, the Shiraz has a yellow label, etc.

== International sales ==
In 2000, the Casellas joined with W.J. Deutsch & Sons, a family-owned marketing and distribution firm, in order to distribute Yellow Tail wines in the United States. In 2001, it sold 200,000 cases, a number that jumped to 2.2 million the next year. In 2005, Yellow Tail sold more wine in the U.S. than all French producers combined.

The success of Yellow Tail in the United States popularised depicting animals on wine labels. This is colloqually called "critter wines". A review by A.C. Nielson in 2006 found that 18% of wines successfully introduced into the US market featured an animal on the label, and achieved more than double the sales of the market average.

Yellow Tail has enjoyed market success in the United Kingdom, which, in 2000, began importing more wine from Australia than from France for the first time in history.

=== Fraud ===
Various local shops around Birmingham, England were found to be selling fraudulent Yellow Tail in 2021, following complaints by a buyer.

== See also ==
- Australian wine
