= Greg Keenan =

Australian rugby league footballer, and sports agent

Personal information
- Born: 2 September 1970 (age 54); Griffith, New South Wales, Australia

Playing information
- Position: Wing
Club
Years	Team	Pld	T	G	FG	P
1991–93	South Sydney	12	2	3	0	14
1994	Illawarra Steelers	5	1	6	0	16
	Total	17	3	9	0	30

Greg Keenan (born 2 September 1970) is an Australian sports agent and former professional rugby league footballer who played for the South Sydney Rabbitohs and the Illawarra Steelers in the NSWRL in the early 1990s.

== Rugby league career ==
A winger from the town of Griffith, Keenan attended St. Gregory's College in Campbelltown and toured with the Australian Schoolboys team in 1988.

Keenan played first-grade for South Sydney from 1991 to 1993, making a total of 12 premiership appearances. His two tries at first-grade level both came in a win over Parramatta at Sydney Football Stadium in 1992. He finished his career with Illawarra and featured in the first five rounds of the 1994 NSWRL season.

== Sports agent ==
Keenan, who is qualified as a lawyer, is the CEO of sports agency Aspire Management, which he founded in 1996.
