= Hermit's Cave =

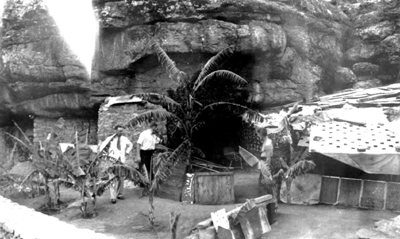
- Hermit's Cave Complex in 1936

- Location within New South Wales Location within Australia
- 34.2679°S 146.0749°E
- Location: Scenic Drive, Griffith, City of Griffith, New South Wales, Australia

History
- Built: 1929–1952

Site notes
- Architect: Valerio Ricetti
- Owner: Land and Property Management Authority (LPMA)

New South Wales Heritage Register
- Official name: Hermit's Cave Complex; Scenic Hill
- Type: state heritage (archaeological-terrestrial)
- Designated: 12 January 2007
- Reference no.: 1766
- Type: Cave
- Category: Transient Accommodation
- Builders: Valerio Ricetti

The Hermit's Cave is a heritage-listed complex of stone structures on Scenic Hill on the northeastern outskirts of Griffith, New South Wales, Australia.

Misleadingly called 'The Hermit's Cave', the site in reality comprises a complex of shelters, terraced gardens, exotic plants, water-cisterns, dry-stone walling and linking bridges, stairways and paths that stretch intermittently across more than a kilometre of the escarpment. Made single-handedly by a reclusive Italian migrant, Valerio Ricetti, these structures involved the moving of hundreds of tons of stone and earth, together with the ingenious incorporation of natural features in the landscape.

The site is recognised for being a rare example of an Australian hermit's domain. It was added to the New South Wales State Heritage Register on 12 January 2007.

== History ==
Over the period from around 1929 to 1952 the hermit Valerio Ricetti fashioned an outcrop of rock shelters and rock overhangs on a ridge-top site outside Griffith into his living quarters. The historical archaeological complex includes rock shelters (some modified into cave-like enclosures), dry-stone walling, stone stairways and paths, terraced gardens, water cisterns, remnant plantings, inscriptions and rock murals. Over more than two decades Ricetti developed, utilised and occupied structures along the one-kilometre-long site where he lived in isolated seclusion from 1929 to 1941. He continued to work on the site until 1952, when he returned to Italy, where he died in the same year.

=== Valerio Ricetti's history as told by others ===
Valerio Ricetti was born in north Italy around 1897-98 in Sondalo, a small town in a valley in the Italian Alps, close to the border with Switzerland. In his home region he was apprenticed as a cement and stonemason and gained experience working on road and rail tunnel constructions. With the declining economic situation and impending war in Europe, his uncle encouraged him to migrate to Australia to seek better opportunities. Aged 16 or 17, Ricetti arrived at Port Pirie, South Australia, in October 1914. He worked at Port Pirie for a few months before heading off to Broken Hill where he stayed at the Ceccato boarding house (signed on as being 18 years old) and obtained work in the mines with Valentino Ceccato and Francesco Bicego. During his time at Broken Hill Ricetti learned to speak English which he spoke well although he retained an accent. Later, Ceccato and Bicego left Broken Hill and came to Griffith. Ricetti continued to work in the mines until 1918 when he left Broken Hill, heartbroken from being spurned by a barmaid he intended to marry. This love affair devastated him and scarred him for the rest of his life.

Ricetti travelled to South Australia where he worked at various jobs for several years. His life experiences fed his disillusionment with humanity. With a year's timber-cutting wages in his pocket he departed for Adelaide where he visited a brothel. On leaving he found that he had left his wallet behind, but the bouncer would not allow him back in. He hurled a rock through a window, was chased and ended up in Adelaide Gaol. On release he left for Victoria. In Melbourne he intended to pawn his one remaining possession, a coat, but a passer-by who offered to pawn it for him never returned. He moved on to Burrinjuck, NSW, in 1928. In the decade since he left Broken Hill Ricetti had befriended many people but few of these friendships had lasted long. Leaving Burrinjuck, he set out on his own. For the next twelve months or so Ricetti followed the Murrumbidgee River downstream to the Lachlan River then upstream to Hillston, NSW.

Griffith's newspaper, "The Area News", reported in 1977 that "He finally found work on a riverboat of the period. He later explained that he had been a sailor on the Murray and that his "ship" had been the Mary Anne. The Mary Anne was one of the many boats that steamed the Murray, Murrumbidgee and Lachlan, and it would appear that Ricetti was to learn more about life during the period he spent on board her; perhaps something about love, unrequited. On the walls of his cave he etched a brief, pathetic epitaph to those days - two hearts and an anchor".

Ricetti walked along the railway line to Griffith, with no idea of where he was heading. He was searching for a location where he could be on his own. That did not eventuate and he reached in Griffith in 1929.

Arriving on the outskirts of Griffith, a sudden rainstorm drove him to seek shelter on Scenic Hill. Next day he explored the area. About a quarter of the way down from the hilltop, he found a huge overhanging rock which was dry underneath. Close by he saw two reservoirs full of water and fruit and vegetable farms at the foot of the hill. To the west was the town rubbish dump which teemed with rabbits.

Tired of travelling, and with no money left, he later recalled saying to himself "I have found the Garden of Eden". Ricetti decided to construct a private utopia, by making the cave his permanent home. He scavenged the rubbish dump where he found a half-worn out shovel, a pick head and an axe head. He felled tree branches to make handles for them. He believed himself to be the only Italian in the area and kept entirely to himself. In reality, his old compatriots Ceccato and Bicego from Broken Hill had settled nearby and increasing numbers of Italian migrants were settling the area.

Ricetti cleared and decorated the caves, creating massive stone galleries and pathways, cliff-side gardens and floral painted rock walls. He worked at night and early in the morning, to remain unseen, eventually moving hundreds of tonnes of rock. Digging under the huge rock, the earth that he threw out rolled down the steep hillside. So he set about building a stone retaining wall. As it was gradually back-filled, he increased the retaining wall height and length. Finally it reached 9 metres long and 2.4 metres high. This gave him a level surface of 2.7 to 3.7 metres outside the cave. Portions on either side of the rock were closed off with stones and clay mortar leaving an opening just over 1 metre wide and 2 metres high to enter the cave.

Outside he planted flowers on both sides of a path that led to the top of the retaining wall. Turning right, he then followed along the top of the wall for about 6 metres where he had made a pathway a little over half a metre wide that led to and from the cave.

Under the lookout, some 36 metres to the right, is a formation of three high rocks in a half circle. The centre one is fashioned by nature as a dome. In front of these rocks he built a stone retaining wall about 1.5 metres high and 4.5 metres long. This he filled with earth to level it, and then he planted more flowers. He called it his "shrine".

Further west he found an area that was partly surrounded by a sheer wall of rocks jutting out from the sloping hill. He made flower beds with pathways leading from one bed to another. On the sloping side he built small stone retaining walls. Near a corner of this complex were four large rocks, joined together front and back, with one either side forming a central open space about 3 metres in diameter. The top was open. On the garden side was a hole about a metre deep that he had to crawl through to get inside. Ricetti dug down in front of the hole to make it large enough to walk through, but just over half a metre down he found rock. At this level he dug inwards, carrying the soil up and forming more flowerbeds. At the centre of this "room" was a rock a little over half a metre high and too large to move. So with stone and clay mortar he shaped it into a table. At the entrance he made a stairway so he could walk down to the cave. For the top he laid thin poles across like a lattice, planting grapevines and wisteria to form a canopy.

Close to these gardens he had a couple of places to hide when people came. These places were not developed in any prominent way. But over the other side of the hill, some 180 metres from the main cave, he built a stone walled circular cave amongst shrubs, around a large tree with a peephole which afforded him another place to hide when people appeared.

In 1935 Ricetti fell off some rocks, breaking his leg and badly bruising his ribs. A passing swagman found him and notified an ambulance that took Ricetti to hospital where the Government Medical Officer, Dr E.W. Burrell, attended to him. He became a celebrity when the enormity of his work on Scenic Hill was discovered. During Ricetti's hospitalisation Wade Shire Council came to his assistance, resolving 'to attend to and maintain the gardens during the hermit's indisposition. Councillor Lenehan stated that the recluse, by vast labour, had added considerably to the interest of Griffith outlook and it was up to the Council to do something for him.'

After leaving hospital Ricetti returned to his reclusive existence. Anxious to pay Dr Burrell for his treatment, however, Ricetti slipped into town at night and worked in the doctor's garden. After a few visits the doctor caught him and explained to Ricetti that payment was made to him by the Government. A friendship grew between the two, which Ricetti valued greatly. Dr Burrell would visit Ricetti regularly at the cave and leave boxes with useful items such as clothes and shoes.

In 1937 a Mr Agostini wandered up the hill one night and came face to face with Ricetti. In conversation the names Ceccato and Bicego came up and Ricetti commented that he had worked at Broken Hill with people of those names. Agostini informed Ceccato of his contact with Ricetti and the acquaintance between Ceccato, Bicego and Ricetti was renewed.

On weekends they would pick up Ricetti, and take him to places where he met many people. They would try to coax him to come and live among them, but the hill remained his home. By now Ricetti had become more socialised and did not shy away from people.

During World War II Ricetti was interned as an enemy alien. He had allegedly lined one of his caves with newspapers that included reports of Hitler with the swastika prominently displayed (Fenwick 1977: 9 ). He was put to work building roads and instructed his captors on how to improve their road-building methods. After four months he was assessed, declared a deranged person and moved to a mental institution at Orange, NSW. Six months later he was released and sent back to Griffith where the police met him and told him to get a job, find accommodation and not go back to the hill. Asked if he could name someone he gave Valentino Ceccato's name, who agreed to take him in.

From 1942 to 1952 Ricetti worked and lived at the Ceccato's, first on Valentino Ceccato's farm until 1948 and then on the farm of Valentino'a son and daughter-in-law, Bruno and Nora Ceccato. From 1943-47 Ricetti worked in the orchards and vineyards alongside Valentino's son, Peter Ceccato, to whom he told stories of his life. But Ricetti was always a loner, working away from others on the farm and sleeping in the pruning shed. He was troubled by visions and obsessed with his cave: "Disturbing him also was an illusion - a "man and woman in the sky". Very real to him, they towered above him, demanding that he do more and more work." By all accounts these visions stemmed from his disastrous love affair in Broken Hill. Ricetti spent as much time as possible at his cave where he stuffed his earnings from Ceccato into clefts in the rocks before Ceccato opened a bank account into which he paid Ricetti's wages direct (Fenwick 1977: 9 ).

In May 1952 Ricetti was in bad health and used the 1400 pounds he had amassed in wages to return to Italy and his brother, with whom he had lost contact. He clearly intended to return as he bought a return ticket and left his savings in the bank. But in November 1952 Bruno Ceccato received notice from the Municipality of Sondrio Vatellina that Ricetti had died

=== Valero Ricetti's history as documented ===
There is very little documentation on Valerio Ricetti's life in Australia and it is almost exclusively confined to records of his internment, dated 1942-45, held by National Archives Australia. Much of the information contained in these records is in the form of Ricetti's answers to a Military Police Questionnaire prior to his internment in 1942. But very little of this information provided by Ricetti can be substantiated by other documents.

Additionally, a photocopy of an employee record for BHP mines was obtained by both J Bicego and J Bugno.

Photocopies of most documents are reproduced in Bobby Caillard, "Recovering the Lost Landscape of Valeri Ricetti: the archaeology of an individual", BA (Hons) thesis, University of Sydney, 2005: Vol 2, 1–30.

Additional enquiries were undertaken by the Heritage Office with National Archives Australia (NAA); State Record Offices in South Australia, Victoria and New South Wales; Glenside Campus (formerly Parkside Lunatic Asylum), Adelaide and Griffith Base Hospital, NSW.

There is no record of Ricetti's date of birth. In 1942 it is recorded as 12 March 1897 and also as 12 March 1903. The latter date is likely incorrect as Ricetti would have been only 11 or 12 years old on arrival in Australia.

Ricetti's arrival date and port of entry into Australia cannot be verified. In 1942 he reports that he arrived in 1914 at Adelaide, date and ship's name unknown, that he paid his own fare and that he had no family or friends in Australia on arrival. But there is no record of his entry into a South Australian port as either a passenger, crew member or ship's deserter over a wide date range around 1914. Neither is he recorded as a passenger entering through a port in Western Australia or Victoria over an equally wide date range. Passenger shipping arrivals into Sydney for this period are not indexed, therefore were not searched (Heritage Office pers. comm. 2006: NAA Adelaide, Perth, Melbourne; State Records SA, NSW; Public Record Office Victoria).

On arrival in Australia, Ricetti claims to have spent "about one year in a mental hospital in South Australia, after which he went to Alice Springs and on to the Northern Territory". One month later Ricetti claims that he worked in the Broken Hill mines from 1914–17 and on the railways at Grafton, NSW, from 1917-21 after which he came to Griffith where he was employed by various Italian farmers for a few days at a time. The records from 1942 also note Ricetti's two court appearances in the period before his arrival in Griffith: at Adelaide on 7 October 1919 for a breach of the War Precautions Act (Aliens) (offence unspecified), fined five pounds or one month's hard labour and at Barham, NSW, on 14 October 1927 for stealing, fined ten pounds or two months hard labour. The same records note that Ricetti claimed to have left his passport at the Adelaide Police Station but that enquiries failed to confirm this and that examination of his finger prints revealed that Ricetti was also known in Adelaide as Frank Pullen and Frank Muler.

Of these claims, only Ricetti's employment at the Broken Hill mines in 1917, his 1927 fine for stealing and a possible gaol sentence in Adelaide in 1919 can be substantiated in the documentary record.

Records of the former Parkside Lunatic Asylum, Adelaide (the only such institution in South Australia at that time) for the period 1914-20 reveal no entries under various possible spellings of Valerio Ricetti or his two aliases.

Ricetti's employment at Broken Hill mines can be verified for only 9 days, 17 to 26 May 1917, after which date he left. The record shows that he resided at Eyre St, South Broken Hill which was the Ceccato boarding house at 305 Eyre Street. He is recorded as Vito Ricetti and his age given as 22 years (instead of 20 years), his age probably falsified to gain employment.

The Adelaide Register of Prisoners has no record for Valerio Ricetti but has two entries for Franz Recitti in 1919 and 1920. The related documents have not been sighted by the Heritage Office but these entries may tally with one of Ricetti's aliases and relate to either his 1919 breach of War Precautions or the Adelaide brothel offence related by Peter Ceccato(Heritage Office pers. comm. 2006: State Records SA).

There is no record of Ricetti working on the railways at Grafton between 1917 and 1921 (Heritage Office pers. comm. 2006: NSW State Records).

The Police Charges and Summons Book, 1924-28 for Barham, NSW, (on the Murray River) records that Ricetti pleaded guilty on 14 October 1927 to stealing 40 dozen oranges for which he was fined 10 pounds in default of two months hard labour in Deniliquin Gaol (Charles Sturt University, NSW, Regional Archives).

During World War II, "enemy aliens" resident in Australia were required to register under National Security (Aliens Control) Regulations, to report to the police station each week and to carry an identify card at all time to avoid arrest (Dalton & Polkinghorne 1990: 845). Ricetti's internment record and associated documents held by the NAA confirm his internment as an enemy alien between May 1942 and December 1943. The documents also reveal the difference in assessment of Ricetti the individual by the local and state police services.

Ricetti was arrested by Griffith Police on 4 March 1942 for failing to register as an alien and to report to police. Ricetti's statement that he was unaware of the requirement to register was accepted by the local police. He was charged with "being deemed insane and found wandering at large" but was discharged five days later following examination by Dr Burrell (who had attended him in Griffith Hospital in 1935) who pronounced him "completely harmless and therefor (sic) not a subject for medical attention in an institution".

In his reports to the Commissioner of Police, Sydney, the Officer-in-Charge of Griffith Police noted that Ricetti spoke German, French and Italian quite fluently. He commented on Ricetti's residence on Scenic Hill, his "considerable skill in stonework", and his work "to beautify the hill" which Ricetti had asserted to him to be "his mission in life" The officer noted that Ricetti had "long been regarded as an eccentric" and the "difficulty is experienced in getting anything like a coherent story from him". He concluded that Ricetti was a "harmless mental deficient who lives the life of a hermit" and that it was not proposed to begin proceedings against him.

Military Police Intelligence, Sydney, however, thought otherwise. They required Ricetti's completion of a four-page questionnaire and a search of his premises for "literature of subversive or disloyal nature" or "prohibited possessions". The search carried out on 10 April 1942 by Griffith Police found nothing.

The questionnaire appears to have been completed in two stages with handwritten entries by Griffith Police and later, typed entries (that include Ricetti's court appearances) probably entered by Military Police Intelligence in Sydney. These typed entries give a more critical assessment of Ricetti. They comment that Ricetti resides "in the highest and most secluded locality in the District ... about a mile from the various petrol depots, electricity substations and water channels in the Irrigation Area" and that he "is known to wander about at night". The entry continues that Ricetti "is regarded with a good deal of suspicion"—a statement that does not square with Griffith Police's assessment of Ricetti as "harmless" and "eccentric"—and concludes "We are of the opinion that this alien should be interned.".

Ricetti was arrested on 3 May 1942 on Scenic Hall and removed to the Liverpool internment camp (south-west of Sydney), from where he was transferred to Cowra in July 1942. Records show he was released from Camp 12, Cowra, on 16 December 1942 but also transferred from Cowra to Loveday internment camp, SA, on 21 April 1943. One account suggests Ricetti was moved during his internment to a mental institution in Orange, NSW, for treatment. However, there is no record for that period of Ricetti being admitted to Bloomfield Hospital, Orange (at that time the only mental institution in Orange).

Ricetti was released from Loveday on 5 December 1943 and taken to Sydney, where he gave his new place of abode as Farm 219 Yoogali, Griffith (Valentino and Elizabeth Ceccato's farm). A year later (30 November 1944) Ricetti notified his change of abode from Farm 219 Yoogali to Scenic Hill, Griffith. This would indicate the earliest official acceptance of his occupation of this Crown Reserve as his place of abode, even though he is remembered as living on the Ceccato farm at that time.

Ricetti's departure from Sydney cannot be confirmed as NSW passenger shipping lists for 1952 are not indexed and therefore were not searched.

The absence of documentary verification for much of Ricetti's story can be at least partly explained by the loss or destruction of many records over time.

=== European traditions of hermitism and North Italian cultural influences ===
Ricetti's experience aligns with European traditions of hermitism that are not essentially religious in origin whereby an individual makes a conscious (rather than an enforced) choice to remove himself or herself from society, often after a long period of solitary wandering (Ricetti trekked on foot for a decade from Adelaide through north Victoria and southern NSW to Griffith). Ricetti's choice of landscape conforms to many European hermit dwellings. Caves are frequently chosen, particularly those located on steep hillsides or in mountains. In this respect Ricetti would have drawn on his Italian upbringing in a mountain valley of north Italy in making his choice of dwelling on the 200-metre-high (660 ft) escarpment of the southern edge of the McPherson Range—a prominent ridge top location in the predominantly flat Riverina Plain. Spiritual iconography is common even among hermits living outside a recognised religious tradition.

North Italian cultural influences can be seen in Ricetti's use of:

(a) skilled stonemasonry with dry stone walling combined with backfilling to create terraces for cultivation on steep and rocky slopes. The use of stone for farmhouses and the skill of dry stone (with no mortar) constructions are prominent in this region as is the use of terracing for cultivation.
(b) planting of grape vines and fruit trees
(c) the "Chapel" with its painted Christian iconography.

== Description ==
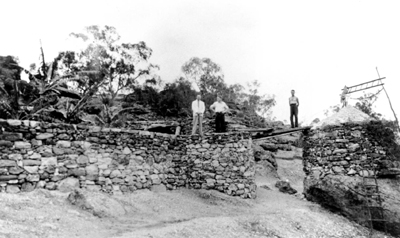
Dry stone walling at the Hermit's Cave complex

The Hermit's Cave Complex is a collection of rock shelters and rock overhangs (several of which have been modified by Ricetti to create cave-like enclosures) with elaborate stoneworks and earthworks created by Ricetti, all of which are located along a long, narrow ridge top site outside Griffith. Ricetti's work is over more than one kilometre along the south-eastern face of Scenic Hill which is a 200-metre-high (660 ft) escarpment on the southernmost part of the McPherson Range. Scenic Hill is now adjacent to the western edge of the Collina residential suburb. The southern and northern edges of the site are defined by Ricetti's hide-outs constructed in rocky outcrops. The western perimeter is currently defined by the road reserve boundary of Scenic Drive although there are possibly remnants of other constructions west and north-west of this road. The area of the nominated site comprises 16.16 ha with a length of 1150 m and varying widths of approximately 120 to 190m.

The archaeological remains of the site are located in discrete areas along the length of the site across a distance of over one kilometre. From south-east to north-west these remains are grouped as follows:

1) Far South Rock Shelter (possible main western hide-out)

- 40-step stone stair;
- hide-out with open rock shelter with three large stone blocks placed in a row;
- small, natural shelter with a narrow passage leading into a small chamber containing natural stone blocks that form a window opening.

2) South Rock Shelter (possible first dwelling)

Rock shelter containing:

- 18-step stone stair;
- dwelling with partly intact stone enclosure walls;
- remnant stonework (remains of the wall and another stone stair).

The small size of the shelter and absence of rock inscriptions and rock murals suggests this was a short-term dwelling used by Ricetti before he constructed and moved into the second, more substantial dwelling.

3) Southern Garden and Rock Shelter (possible second dwelling)

This dwelling is associated with two gardens, three cisterns, a rock shelter popularly known as "La Scala" (Opera House) and its inscriptions. It is recorded in historical photographs and is remembered to have been built and occupied before the third dwelling.

A) Rock Shelter containing:

- east stone stair leading to the garden;
- bottom stone stair from the east, leading to a narrow passage between two boulders with a low wall into the dwelling;
- dwelling, being a rock shelter overhang that was walled off, containing a stonework window;
- top stone stair rising from the rock shelter overhang;
- west stone stair into a narrow passage between two boulders leading to a second, small chamber that contains a large flattish stone). This chamber is thought to have been a cistern.
- holes (chiselled out) that were used to support timber trellis structures.

B) Gardens The largest and most complex zone of the site being 60 metres long and 35 metres wide. Located along the base of a cliff face below the ridge top with a drop in level of 10 metres.

i) Upper Garden. Designed as three terraces with cisterns, connecting stairs, paths and a dwelling. Its remnant features are earthwork terraces with stone retaining walls; metal materials (steel sheet, wire) for shoring terraces and construction; remnant fig plantings; remnant yucca plantings and yucca plantings that have invaded the surrounding area.
ii) Lower Garden. Contains the best-constructed and best-preserved example of Ricetti's stonework. It comprises an earth-filled stone retaining wall forming an elevated walkway.

C) Cisterns

i) Uppermost Cistern. Situated in the top terrace and fed by moisture from the cliff face.
ii) Second Cistern. Situated outside the north-eastern retaining walls of the garden at the middle terrace level and fed by moisture from the cliff face and surface run-off.
iii) Lower Cistern. Adjacent to and below the lower garden and fed by surface run-off from the gardens and possibly the top cistern.

D) Natural Amphitheatre-Shaped Rock Shelter featuring:

- stone retaining wall to form a bridge;
- stone staircase remnants;
- location of a bush timber ladder that was used to provide access to a rock shelf;
- rock inscriptions at the base of the cliff with a mixture of Christian and other motifs.

i) Rock shelter popularly known as 'La Scala' (or the 'Opera House')

- a place of suitable acoustics where Ricetti used to stand and call out. His voice could sometimes be heard as far away as the town

ii) Rock inscriptions at 'La Scala':

Rock inscriptions occur in three areas.

a) The lower rock gallery is at the base of the cliff and contains a mixture of Christian and other symbols:

- a court jester's face and hat, with three crucifixes representing the hill of Calvary;
- three fishes (an early Christian symbol) intertwined;
- apocalyptic message, incomplete, in back to front lettering in a combination of Latin and Italian: 'paratus nun qua no...'('be prepared').

b) Partly up the rock face, near the stone stair to the "La Scala" rock shelf, is the date 1918 and initials RV ( Valerio Ricetti's, back to front). This date predates Ricetti's known arrival in the area.

c) Inscription on a rock floor of later date is c. 1923 (also predates Ricetti's arrival).

E) Two Stone Stairs

- upper stone stair built with low risers (possibly for carrying rocks from the quarry);
- hidden stone stair, winding down through a passage between boulders.

4) Central 'Hide-Outs'

- stone stair on contour forming part of the main track linking the gardens with the 'Main Cave';
- natural chamber formed by two boulders with stone blocks at the entrance (the lower hide-out);
- small natural rock shelter with no stonework (the upper hide-out).

5) Main Cave (possible third dwelling)

This dwelling is the best-known and best-maintained of Ricetti's works. It is associated with other structures that are popularly known as "Kitchen", "Gun Post", "Art Gallery", "Chapel", stone stair and "The Cliffs Cave" inscription.

A) Rock Shelter containing:

- stone-walled sleeping chamber with doorway;
- painted rock murals featuring flower and ship's anchor motifs;
- second chamber with fireplace, known as the 'Kitchen';
- remnant fig planting;
- remnant oleander planting;
- back-filled retaining walls separating the dwelling from the "Gun Post".

B) 'Gun Post'

A stone earthwork resembling a small fortification. Historical photographs show a gang plank bridge connecting it to the third dwelling. No evidence of a real defensive purpose has been found, but it appears to have been used by Ricetti to monitor his surroundings.

C) 'Art Gallery'

A separate chamber connected to the third dwelling. This was remembered to contain a cinema poster of King Kong.

D) 'Chapel'

- natural rock amphitheatre with views to the east;
- earthwork terraces with stone retaining walls;
- various materials (steel, wire) still in place and visible, for shoring up and reinforcing the terraces;
- rock mural with cross and the initials VR to the left of the cross and RV to the right of it.

E) Stone Stair

90-step remnant of stone stair constructed by Ricetti.

F) "The Cliffs Cave" Inscription

A historic inscription (predating Ricetti's occupation) reads "H.M. Alf. Irv. Driver The Cliffs Born Nov. 21/-70". Alf Driver was the pioneer selector of the local property, The Cliffs. The inscription is chiselled in elegant, cursive script into the floor of the rock shelter which is located near a hazardous rock ledge that is reached by a narrow passage between two boulders. From the rock shelter there is a magnificent 180 degree view of the Riverina Plain and the slopes of the hill below. The site clearly has a larger and previous history of use by settlers and travellers and probably an even older Aboriginal association.

6) North Rock Shelter (1)

A narrow, rectangular shelter with two built walls, it is well concealed at the foot of a sheer rock face. Located about 100 metres north-east of the third dwelling, it is connected by pathways to the third dwelling, ridge top and North Rock Shelter (2).

7) North Rock Shelter (2)

Defining the northern limits of the Hermit's Cave Complex, it is located about 100 metres north-east of North Rock Shelter (1):

- enclosed rock shelter, well concealed and out of sight from both the ridge top and from below;
- 30-step stone stair connecting the shelter to the ridge top and the bottom of the hill. The top section (10 steps) is steep and narrow, descending between two rock faces.
- faded white diagonal lines painted on one internal rock face.

8) Site of Western Shelter

This site is known through archival photographs and supported by oral history although no physical evidence of the structure has been found. Its stone structures were probably dismantled for use in gardens. Its location has been given as 'just to the west of the track [Scenic Drive] about 100–200 yards in on the flat, north-north-west of the cave's old entrance, north of the look-out'.

Archival photographs indicate a worked stone structure with large, smooth-finished rectangular blocks framing a wooden doorway with jambs and curved lintel of "wilga timber". The structure was a small room built around a hollow wilga tree at the base of which Ricetti had built a fireplace so that the tree could serve as a chimney. The door and a peephole allowed Ricetti to view the approaches from all sides. Ricetti used the structure as both a kitchen and a hide-out but abandoned it because of visitors or vandals.

=== Condition ===
The gardens were reported to be in a fair condition as at 19 June 2006, although erosion of clay mortar supporting the stone masonry work on the retaining walls is a concern. Erosion is equally a concern on the retaining walls to the "Chapel". Graffiti is a concern, with graffiti damage to some of Ricetti's original rock art.

Some of the staircases are still in a pristine condition. Taking into account the nature of the rudimentary construction, the site is remarkably intact.

The site has considerable archaeological potential. There are possibly remnants of constructions to the west and north-west of Scenic Drive (outside the nominated curtilage) but their locations are unknown.

The site retains most of its original design and material. Much of the original stonewalling is intact. It has suffered some damage due to graffiti, vandalism and erosion of original material.

=== Modifications and dates ===
The landscape has been modified on several occasions between the 1970s and 1990s. The most prominent modifications ( by Council) are the Sir Dudley de Chair look-out area above the "Chapel" and a steel hand-rail along the stairs from the lookout to the "Chapel" together with work undertaken by the Apex Club in the 1970s, being the construction of a 60-step stone stair from the lookout to the "Chapel". Apex have also attempted to reconstruct part of the "Main Cave". Apex, however, used cement mortar, which deviated from Ricetti's utilisation of clay-mortar and dry-stone techniques.

== Heritage listing ==
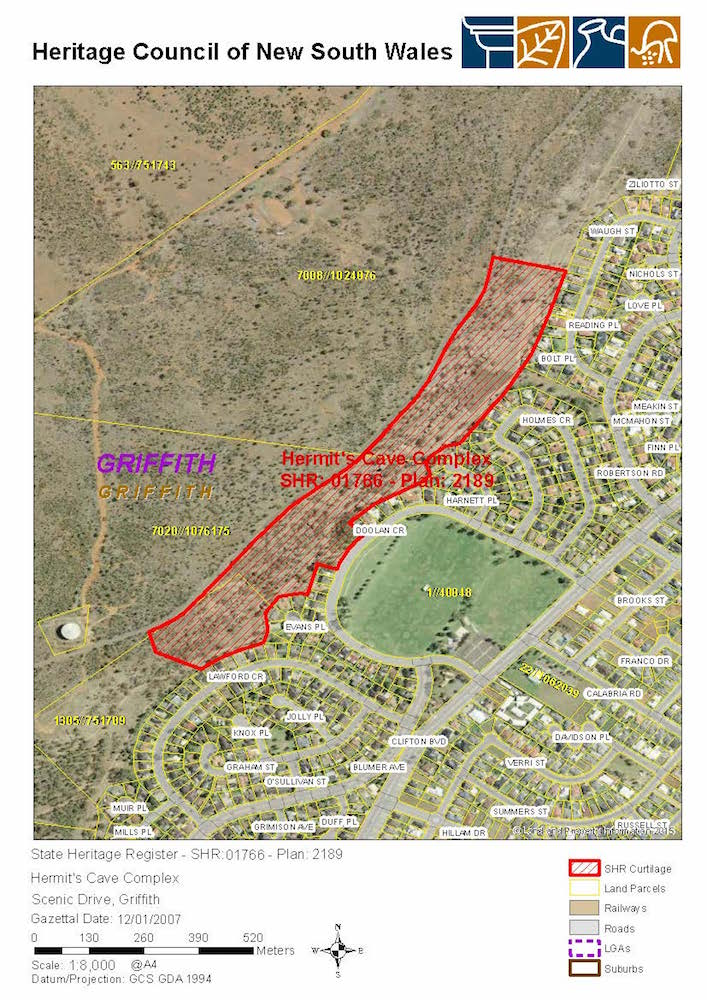
Heritage boundaries

The cultural landscape and historical archaeological complex known as the Hermit's Cave Complex has state significance as a rare example in New South Wales of a documented, extensive and relatively intact complex of recluse dwellings that is an outstanding twentieth century archaeological site containing rare examples of rock art, historic graffiti, numerous stone structures, earthworks and remnant cultivation.

The Hermit's Cave Complex has multicultural heritage values that constitute material evidence of the response of one individual, the Italian migrant Valerio Ricetti, to the impact of migration in the period after World War 1. The site documents Ricetti's resourcefulness and skill and demonstrates a rare interpretation and integration of natural landscape and materials to create not just a shelter but, over time, an elaborate complex comprising hide-outs, a lookout and modified cave-like enclosures supplemented by retaining stone walls, linking bridges, stone stairways, paths and earthworks with terraced gardens, remnant plantings and water cisterns.

The Hermit's Cave Complex illustrates a European tradition of hermitism that is rarely found in New South Wales.

The Hermit's Cave Complex has outstanding educational, interpretative and research potential as a resource for the study of historical archaeology and ethnic history.

Hermit's Cave Complex was listed on the New South Wales State Heritage Register on 12 January 2007 having satisfied the following criteria.

The place is important in demonstrating the course, or pattern, of cultural or natural history in New South Wales.

The Hermit's Cave Complex has state significance for its capacity to demonstrate a historical pattern of migration experiences in material form. Ricetti's story of a young, non English-speaking migrant with no family or friendship networks in Australia is significant for the individuality of his response (in an Australian context) to the pressures and opportunities of migration.

Ricetti's retreat from human interaction was marked initially by a decade of aimless solitary trekking around inland southern New South Wales and adjacent parts of Victoria and South Australia that ended with his decision to set down roots, build a retreat and live off the land in seclusion when he sighted the rocky ridge top of Scenic Hill on the outskirts of Griffith.

Over a 23-year period Ricetti did more than merely construct a habitable shelter on the ridge top. He invested a vast amount of time and physical labour in considerably modifying the landscape to suit his purposes and to create an aesthetically pleasing environment. He backfilled a total area of 505 square metres to create terraces for cultivation on the steep slopes of the escarpment. The soil in the cultivated areas has been identified as fine and pebble-free in an otherwise stony environment which indicates a sieving process (Ricetti could access and adapt materials located on the town dump nearby). The terraces were planted with a variety of edible and ornamental plants which demonstrates aesthetic as well as practical values. Ricetti collected, shifted, cut and placed thousands of cubic metres of stone to create the series of retaining walls around the ten identified terraces and the extensive stairways that link the elements of the site.

The plantings have been identified as including grape vines, fig, olive and stone-fruit trees. These take several years to fruit which would indicate Ricetti viewed this cultivation as long term investment. Other plantings such as tomato, passion-fruit vines, sweet peas and lettuce would have required intensive care and nurturing in Griffith's semi-arid climate, evidenced by Ricetti's construction of water cisterns.

This level of activity and attention demonstrates that Ricetti valued his dwelling with a high degree of both physical and emotional investment as a permanent home and a long-term project.

Oral history indicates he was driven by "visions" to work on his project. Ricetti's response can perhaps be understood in the context of European traditions of hermitism, especially in the Alpine regions of northern Italy where his choice of landscape echoes that of many European hermit dwellings. North Italian cultural influences can be seen in Ricetti's use of :

(a) skilled stonemasonry with dry stone walling;
(b) planting of grape vines and fruit trees; and
(c) the chapel cave with its painted Christian iconography.

Ricetti's is an important story in the narratives of "difference" or "the other", not only for his response to society but also for society's response to him. At the local level the community understands his "difference" and values his work on Scenic Hill: his hospitalisation engenders community support during his absence and, in World War II, the local police consider him no threat and his work to be valuable. At the impersonal level of state jurisdiction, however, his "difference" is viewed unfavourably. He is demonised for his nationality and nonconformity and interned as an enemy alien, suspicions compounded by his 14 years of social alienation. These distinctions may reflect wider patterns in wartime internment processes.

The place has a strong or special association with a person, or group of persons, of importance of cultural or natural history of New South Wales's history.

The Hermit's Cave Complex is of local significance for its association with the extensively documented life of Valerio Ricetti, the subject of local folklore as the "hermit" of Scenic Hill.

The place is important in demonstrating aesthetic characteristics and/or a high degree of creative or technical achievement in New South Wales.

The Hermit's Cave Complex is significant at state level as an example of multicultural heritage and as an aesthetically distinctive cultural landscape. It demonstrates through its landmark qualities an individual's adaptation of the landscape and natural materials to provide shelter, food and an aesthetically pleasing environment as a response to social dislocation and isolation. As such it is in the tradition of European ascetic/hermit retreat dwellings created to provide for seclusion from society.

The landmark qualities of the Hermit's Cave Complex align with European traditions of hermitism that are not essentially religious in origin. Ricetti's choice of landscape conforms to many European hermit dwellings. Caves are frequently chosen, particularly those located on steep hillsides or on mountains. In this respect Ricetti would have drawn on his Italian upbringing in a mountain valley of north Italy in making his choice of dwelling the 200-metre-high (660 ft) escarpment of the southern edge of the McPherson Range—a prominent ridge-top location in the predominantly flat Riverina Plain.

Spiritual iconography is common even among hermits living outside a recognised religious tradition. Ricetti's work reflects Italian hermit traditions of painting and inscribing important images and texts on cave walls.

North Italian cultural influences can be seen in Ricetti's creative and technical achievements, specifically in his:

(a) skilled stonemasonry with dry stone walling combined with backfilling to create terraces for cultivation on steep and rocky slopes. The use of stone for farmhouse building and the skill of dry stone (with no mortar) constructions are prominent in this region and are reflected in the stonework of the Hermit's Cave Complex, as is the use of terracing for cultivation.
(b) planting of grape vines and fruit trees
(c) decoration of the chapel cave with its painted Christian iconography.

The site is a popular place for meditative walks, in a setting reminiscent of ancient European archaeological monuments. The stonework and gardens recall the stone structures and intensively modified rural landscapes of northern Italy.

The place has strong or special association with a particular community or cultural group in New South Wales for social, cultural or spiritual reasons.

The Hermit's Cave Complex has social significance at the local level for the Griffith community, and in particular the Italian community of Griffith and the surrounding Murrumbidgee Irrigation Area, as an important element of local folklore.

The place has potential to yield information that will contribute to an understanding of the cultural or natural history of New South Wales.

The Hermit's Cave Complex is of state significance as an outstanding example of a twentieth century historical archaeological site that is suitable for further research. It has outstanding educational, interpretative and research potential as a resource for the study of historical archaeology, multicultural heritage and migration history:

- as an example of "ethnic nostalgia", reproducing aspects of structures and modified landscapes of rural Italy in an alien setting (specifically the stonework and gardens)
- as a complex historical archaeological site
- as a migration story of an individual's response to the impact of settlement, internment and poverty.

The place possesses uncommon, rare or endangered aspects of the cultural or natural history of New South Wales.

Outstanding level of rarity. The Hermit's Cave Complex has state significance as a rare, documented example of a known hermit dwelling and a document of recluse living, especially in terms of the extent and complex nature of the site. Some of the known examples of hermit and/or cave dwellings evidence some construction techniques similar to Ricetti's, such as dry stone walling, some terracing and water provision. But these examples are either on a considerably smaller scale, are evidence of community activity or are constructions by squatters who were not hermits. The known examples of cave dwellings appear to be linked to squatting, mainly in the 1930s depression. None of these examples show similar evidence of the extent and complexity of Ricetti's construction works at the Hermit's Cave Complex.

The place is important in demonstrating the principal characteristics of a class of cultural or natural places/environments in New South Wales.

The Hermit's Cave Complex has state significance for being representative in its physical forms of some aspects of the small number of known examples of recluse living in New South Wales, most of which are in the Sydney region. Enquiries have revealed a number of previously occupied caves in New South Wales that reflect either depression era occupation, squatting by individuals who are not necessarily hermits, or more elaborate constructions by communities of fringe dwellers. Many cave shelters throughout the national parks that flank Sydney—the Royal to the south, the Blue Mountains to the west and Kuring-gai Chase to the north—were depression-era dwellings of the 1930s, such as the former fishermen's caves at Cape Solander (Botany Bay), the caves in the Domain in the city, and Poet's Cave in Lane Cove National Park, Sydney, that was inhabited by a hermit who was also believed to be responsible for a biblical inscription on a rock in the park. In north-western New South Wales caves were occupied at Lightening Ridge and in the Warrumbungle Ranges, the latter reputedly used by cattle duffers (dates unknown). Other "hermit-type" dwellings like the Crater Cove huts on Sydney Harbour and huts along the Hawkesbury River grew in popularity in the 1930s depression but originated earlier and continued their existence later as communities of fringe dwellers. The Crater Cove huts were first constructed by squatters during the 1920s in the Middle Harbour bushland and remained inhabited until 1988. They were built on the low cliffs and wide rock platforms facing the harbour with water tanks carved into the rock, stone built chimneys, paths and edging. A group of Hawkesbury River huts (with boat access only) were occupied by one family group and included wells, terracing of the ridges, gardens, extensive dry stone walling and linking pathways. A large and impressive two-storey, Swiss chalet style dwelling was constructed by a squatter over a 40-year period from the 1920s at Hungry Beach in Kuring-gai Chase National Park. The building had 2-metre-high (6.6 ft) circular stone walls, its own water supply, polished concrete floors and all fixed furniture (sofas, kitchen benches, cupbords, wardrobes etc) was built of polished ferrocement. During World War II it was occupied by the United States military. The builder was not a hermit and he sourced (and paid for) building materials that he brought in by barge from Sydney. The building was reputedly demolished in 1969 while the occupant (then in his eighties) was hospitalised. The Hermit's Cave Complex is representative of some of these construction techniques as a class or type of item and is the finest known example of its type.
