= Jason Wells (rugby league) =

Australian rugby league footballer

Personal information
- Full name: Jason Wells
- Born: 18 February 1984 (age 42) Griffith, New South Wales, Australia

Playing information
- Position: Second-row, Loose forward
Club
| Years | Team | Pld | T | G | FG | P |
|---|---|---|---|---|---|---|
| 2007 | Manly Sea Eagles | 3 | 0 | 0 | 0 | 0 |
| 200?–?? | Toulouse Olympique | | 0 | 0 | 0 | 0 |
| | Total | 3 | 0 | 0 | 0 | 0 |
Representative
| Years | Team | Pld | T | G | FG | P |
| 200? | NSW Residents | 1 | 0 | 0 | 0 | 0 |
- Source: As of 22 June 2026

Jason Wells (born 18 February 1984 in Griffith, New South Wales, Australia), is an Australian former professional rugby league footballer who last played for the Newtown Jets in the New South Wales Cup. He played as a lock and second-row forward.

Wells had previously played in the NRL for the Manly-Warringah Sea Eagles and Toulouse Olympique in France. He had also played for the NSW Residents representative team.
