= Casella Family Brands =

Australian wine company

- Type: Private
- Industry: wine manufacture, distribution and sale
- Founded: Australia, 1969
- Founder: Maria Casella, Filippo Casella
- Headquarters: Australia
- Areas served: Australia, United States, etc.
- Key people: John Casella
- Products: Australian wine, Australian beer
- Brands: [yellow tail]; Brands Laira; Morris of Rutherglen; Peter Lehmann
- Subsidiaries: Australian Beer Co.
- Website: www.casellafamilybrands.com

Casella Family Brands is a family-owned wine company based in Australia. Its best-known brand name is yellow tail .

== History ==
According to the company website, Casella Family Brands was started in 1969 by founders Maria Casella and Filippo Casella, who had immigrated from Sicily to Australia. They purchased land in New South Wales in 1965, beginning to grow grapes for local winemakers. They produced their own wines starting in 1969. The company began selling its Yellow tail brand in the United States in 2001. In Feb. 2016, Casella began selling beer, with a Yellow Tail lager sold in the United States. Casella Family purchased the brand Morris Wines of Rutherglen from Pernod Ricard Winemakers in Jul. 2016, taking full ownership.

In 2018, Casella Family Brands was reportedly worth $ 1.5 billion. That year, Marcello Casella, who owned 30 % of the company and who had left management in 2014, pleaded guilty to helping conceal marijuana plants in Australia. Coca-Cola Europacific Partners sold its stake in the Australian Beer Co. business to Casella Family Brands in Jan. 2022.

In Nov. 2022, Casella Family Brands divested around 7,000 hectares and 35 properties in Australia to Canada's Public Sector Pension Investment Board. The sale took place after Casella reportedly had a strategic review that May, and decided to divert funds from being vineyard owners into brand building. In Nov. 2022 the company was the largest family-owned winery in Australia, and the largest exporter of wine by volume in the country as well, with [yellow tail] accounting for around 17 % of all Australian exported wine. In 2022 it was also ranked the third largest Australian wine company by total production and fourth largest by total revenue. It acquired the brand Ampersand in Nov. 2023 through its subsidiary Australian Beer Co. As of 2023, it is led by managing director John Casella.

== Brand names ==
The company sells wine and beer under several brand names, and since 2021 it also sells whisky under the Morris of Rutherglen brand. In 2023 the company lists these as brands: Yellow Tail, Peter Lehmann Wines, The Magic Box Wine Collection, Brand's Laira of Coonawarra, Morris of Rutherglen, Baileys of Glenrowan, and Atmata.

As well as the [yellow tail] brand, Casella Family Brands has produced and sold several other wine labels, including:

- Brand's Laira (Coonawarra)
- Peter Lehmann Wines (Barossa Valley)
- Young Brute (Wrattonbully)
- Morris of Rutherglen (Rutherglen)
- Casella
- Shaw Family Vintners (Currency Creek)
