= Griffith, New South Wales =

Griffith
- City
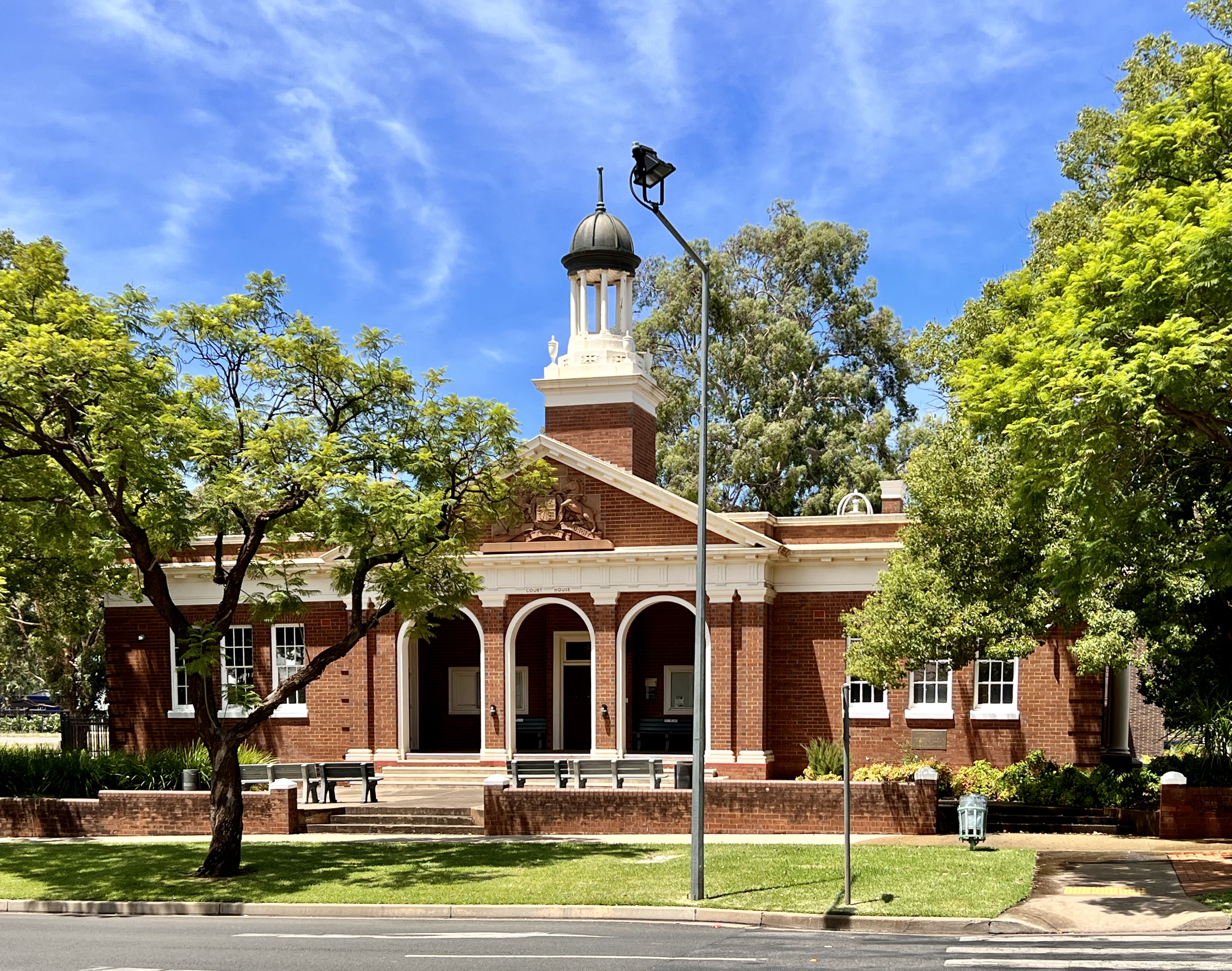
- Griffith Court House

- Coordinates: 34°17′24″S 146°2′24″E
- Country: Australia
- State: New South Wales
- LGA: City of Griffith
- Location: 191 km (119 mi) NW of Wagga Wagga; 358 km (222 mi) WNW of Canberra; 458 km (285 mi) NNE of Melbourne; 568 km (353 mi) WSW of Sydney
- Established: 4 August 1916

Government
  - State electorate: Murray
  - Federal division: Farrer
- Elevation: 129.2 m (424 ft)

Population
  - Total: 20,569 (2021)
- Time zone: UTC+10 (AEST)
  - Summer (DST): UTC+11 (AEDT)
- Postcode: 2680
- County: Cooper
- Mean max temp: 24.0 °C (75.2 °F)
- Mean min temp: 10.1 °C (50.2 °F)
- Annual rainfall: 397.6 mm (15.65 in)

Griffith is a major regional city in the Riverina - Murray region of western New South Wales, known commonly as the food bowl of Australia. It is also the seat of the City of Griffith local government area. Like the Australian capital, Canberra, and extensions to the nearby town of Leeton, Griffith was designed by Walter Burley Griffin and Marion Mahony Griffin. Griffith was named after Arthur Hill Griffith, the then New South Wales Secretary for Public Works. Griffith was proclaimed a city in 1987, and at the 2021 census had a population of 20,569.

It can be accessed by road from Sydney and Canberra via the Hume Highway and the Burley Griffin Way and from Melbourne, via the Newell Highway and either by using the Kidman Way or the Irrigation Way. Griffith can be accessed from other places like Adelaide, Orange, and Bathurst through the Mid-Western Highway and the Rankins Springs road from Rankins Springs and the Kidman Way from Goolgowi.

== History ==
Griffith and other towns were created as part of the New South Wales State Government's Murrumbidgee Irrigation Area (MIA) project, a plan to supply irrigation from the Murrumbidgee river to open up western New South Wales for farming.

The town plan for Griffith, and nearby Leeton, was designed by Walter Burley Griffin in 1914, an unusual geometric pattern centred on a set of circular streets, with broad avenues radiating out in an octagonal arrangement. The streets were surveyed mostly according to that plan, and Griffith was declared a town in August 1916.

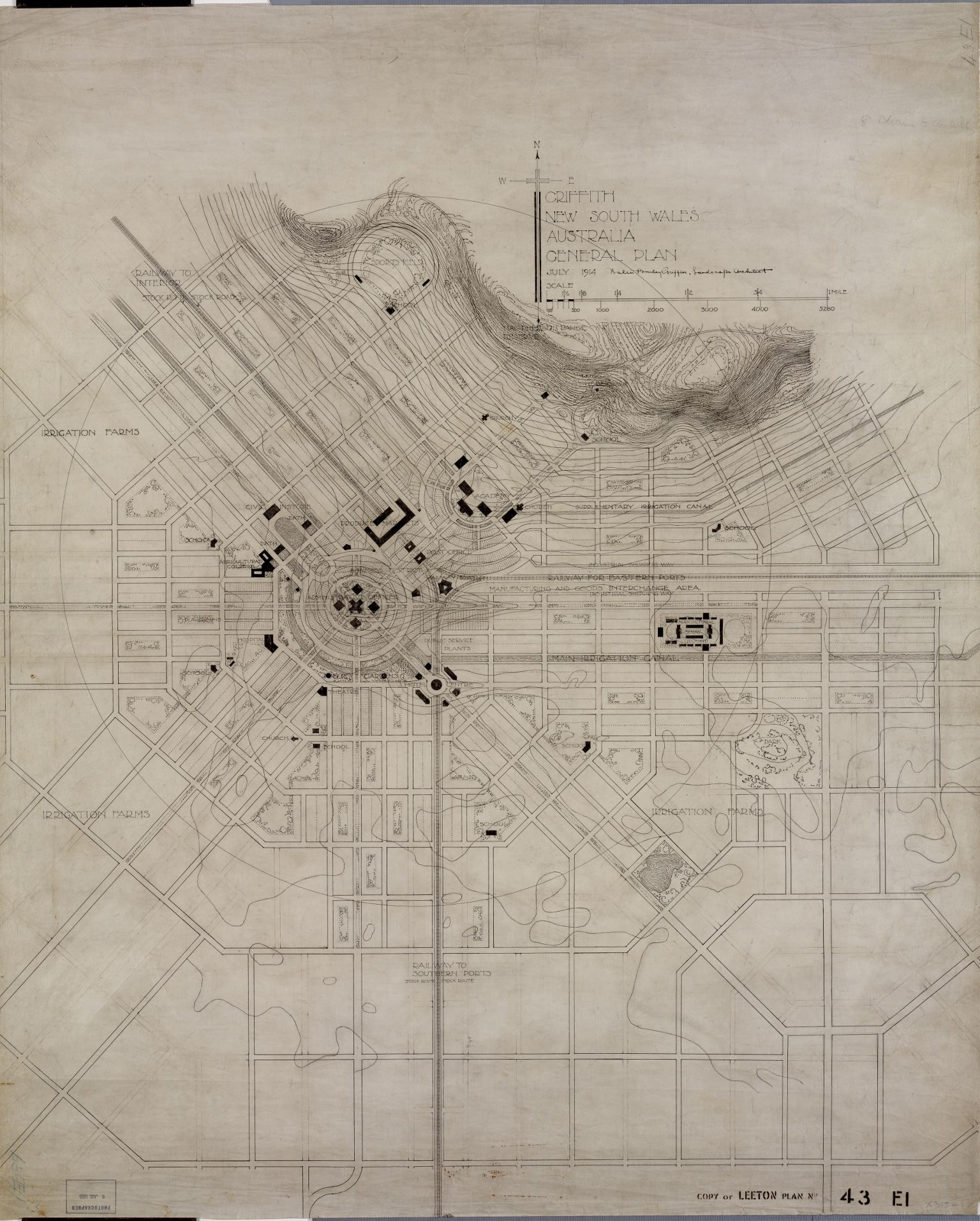
Plan of Griffith, 1914

The main dam of the scheme was the large Burrinjuck Dam on the Murrumbidgee between Gundagai and Canberra, but was not completed until 1928. The Berembed Weir, near Narrandera, was built in 1912, diverting water from the Murrumbidgee River into the Bundidgerry Creek then into the Main Canal of the MIA at Narrandera. The Canal, almost a river in its own right, flows through the MIA, supplying water to the entire area, then flows through Griffith as part of the geometric plan, and peters out to the northwest of the town in rice farms.

The water supply was further enhanced with the construction of the Snowy Mountains Scheme by the Australian Federal Government in the 1950s and 1960s. The Blowering Dam, a large dam near Tumut, stores a significant amount of water to be released down the Murrumbidgee for irrigation around Leeton, Griffith and the newer Coleambally area south of the river and Griffith.

From the start of the MIA, citrus and other fruit and vegetables were grown in abundance around Griffith. In the 1950s the irrigation area expanded to include large rice farms. Vineyards were established early, and wineries followed, beginning with McWilliam's Wines at Hanwood and Yenda, two villages just outside the city.

From its earliest days, the MIA was populated by Italian workers, some of whom were initially employed by Australian farmers to run steamboats on the Murrumbidgee and Murray Rivers. Approximately 60% of today's Griffith population claim Italian background. These include the initial settlement of Italians from the boat crews and other Italians who came out to Australia in the Depression, or from a second wave of immigrant Italians who came to Griffith in the late 1950s and early 1960s.

In the 1970s, Griffith was often associated with drug distribution (particularly marijuana) and organised crime, as depicted in 2009 by Underbelly: A Tale of Two Cities. However, Griffith is now associated with good wine and food, primarily as a result of its diverse population, with notable contributions by Italian-Australians. Griffith's multi-ethnic population is now absorbing new national groups, including a significant Sikh Indian community. The city is sister city with the Italian city of Treviso in the Veneto Region. Many Italians in Griffith are from the Veneto Region or the Calabria Region of Italy.

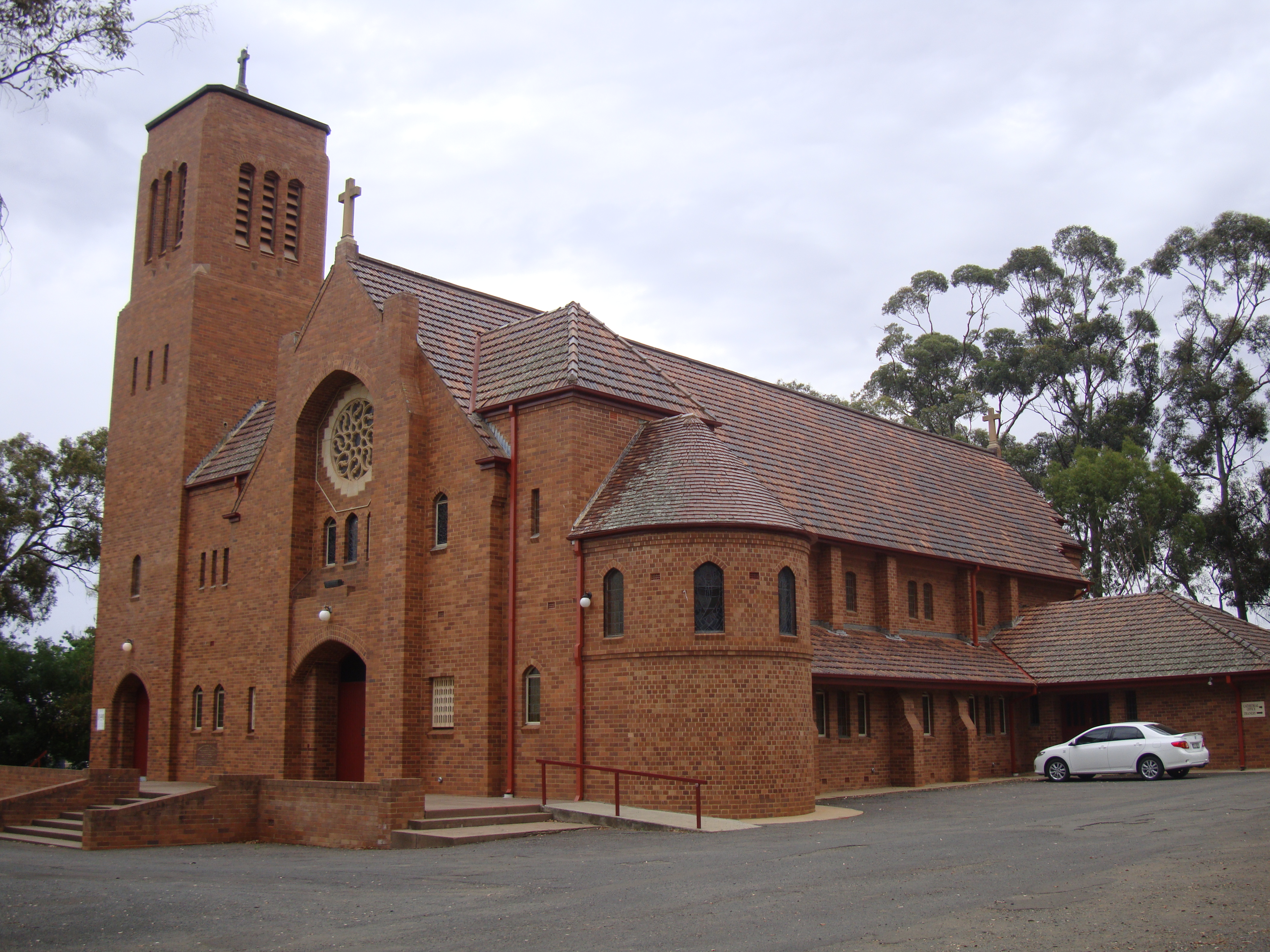
St Alban's Cathedral

The Italian influence expanded the range of fruit and vegetables, and also significantly increased the number of wineries and the range of wines produced by the existing wineries in the region, such as McWilliam's. De Bortoli, Rosetto, Calabria and other wineries were established by Italian immigrants, and today they are well known around Australia. In recent times they have been joined by one of the country's best known wine labels, Yellow Tail, produced by Casella Family Brands. Casella, DeBortoli, McWilliam's, Warburn and Berton Vineyards are now among the top 20 wine producers in Australia.

Griffith is the cathedral city of the Anglican Diocese of Riverina. The foundation stone of the Parish Church of St Alban the Martyr was dedicated in 1954. It was proclaimed as a cathedral in 1984.

== Heritage listings ==
Griffith has a number of heritage-listed sites, including:

- Scenic Drive: Hermit's Cave

== Climate ==
Griffith has a cold semi-arid climate (BSk) under the Köppen climate classification with hot summers and contrastingly cool winters; and low, evenly-spread rainfall through the year. Extreme temperatures at Griffith Airport AWS have ranged from 47.2 °C (117.0 °F) on 4 January 2020 to −5.9 °C (21.4 °F) on 17 July 1977. The city is rather sunny, featuring 123.8 clear days and 2,836 sun hours annually, though its winters are notably cloudier than Sydney's at a similar latitude.

On 3 February 2005 a maximum of only 13.0 °C (55.4 °F) was registered, being exceptionally cold for this northern latitude and very low elevation.

Climate data for Griffith Airport AWS (1991–2020, extremes 1970–2025); 134 m AMSL; 34.25° S, 146.07° E
Month	Jan	Feb	Mar	Apr	May	Jun	Jul	Aug	Sep	Oct	Nov	Dec	Year
Record high °C (°F)	47.2 (117.0)	45.8 (114.4)	42.0 (107.6)	38.3 (100.9)	29.8 (85.6)	25.0 (77.0)	23.6 (74.5)	30.0 (86.0)	38.2 (100.8)	39.2 (102.6)	43.2 (109.8)	45.4 (113.7)	47.2 (117.0)
Mean maximum °C (°F)	41.9 (107.4)	40.7 (105.3)	36.4 (97.5)	31.5 (88.7)	26.0 (78.8)	21.0 (69.8)	20.0 (68.0)	23.9 (75.0)	29.0 (84.2)	33.9 (93.0)	39.1 (102.4)	40.2 (104.4)	43.0 (109.4)
Mean daily maximum °C (°F)	33.9 (93.0)	32.6 (90.7)	29.1 (84.4)	24.5 (76.1)	19.4 (66.9)	15.8 (60.4)	15.0 (59.0)	16.8 (62.2)	20.7 (69.3)	24.9 (76.8)	28.8 (83.8)	31.4 (88.5)	24.4 (75.9)
Daily mean °C (°F)	26.0 (78.8)	25.2 (77.4)	21.8 (71.2)	17.5 (63.5)	13.2 (55.8)	10.4 (50.7)	9.3 (48.7)	10.3 (50.5)	13.4 (56.1)	17.2 (63.0)	21.1 (70.0)	23.7 (74.7)	17.4 (63.4)
Mean daily minimum °C (°F)	18.1 (64.6)	17.7 (63.9)	14.5 (58.1)	10.5 (50.9)	7.0 (44.6)	5.0 (41.0)	3.6 (38.5)	3.8 (38.8)	6.0 (42.8)	9.5 (49.1)	13.4 (56.1)	16.0 (60.8)	10.4 (50.8)
Mean minimum °C (°F)	11.0 (51.8)	10.8 (51.4)	7.3 (45.1)	4.3 (39.7)	1.1 (34.0)	−0.6 (30.9)	−1.5 (29.3)	−1.8 (28.8)	0.5 (32.9)	2.9 (37.2)	6.3 (43.3)	8.5 (47.3)	−2.5 (27.5)
Record low °C (°F)	6.8 (44.2)	6.6 (43.9)	4.2 (39.6)	−0.1 (31.8)	−2.3 (27.9)	−4.0 (24.8)	−5.9 (21.4)	−4.8 (23.4)	−2.2 (28.0)	0.4 (32.7)	1.8 (35.2)	4.2 (39.6)	−5.9 (21.4)
Average rainfall mm (inches)	28.5 (1.12)	32.4 (1.28)	26.7 (1.05)	21.1 (0.83)	26.9 (1.06)	36.0 (1.42)	32.2 (1.27)	27.6 (1.09)	29.8 (1.17)	37.2 (1.46)	39.8 (1.57)	34.5 (1.36)	372.7 (14.68)
Average rainy days (≥ 0.2 mm)	4.9	4.8	3.8	4.4	6.5	9.8	11.5	8.4	6.5	6.6	6.9	5.2	79.3
Average afternoon relative humidity (%) (at 3 pm)	27	35	33	38	48	60	60	51	44	36	31	31	41
Average dew point °C (°F)	8.5 (47.3)	10.9 (51.6)	8.8 (47.8)	7.3 (45.1)	6.9 (44.4)	6.8 (44.2)	5.9 (42.6)	4.8 (40.6)	5.5 (41.9)	5.0 (41.0)	6.3 (43.3)	7.3 (45.1)	7.0 (44.6)
Mean monthly sunshine hours	300.7	274.0	269.7	231.0	182.9	156.0	167.4	186.0	213.0	244.9	288.0	322.4	2,836
Source 1: Griffith Airport AWS (dew point at 3 pm)
Source 2: Griffith CSIRO (sunshine hours, 1962–1978)

== Commerce ==
Griffith is the regional service centre for the vast Murrumbidgee Irrigation Area, one of the most productive agricultural regions in Australia. Thanks to irrigation, Griffith is rich in agriculture and the city is also known as Australia's "Wine and Food Country".

=== Commercial ===
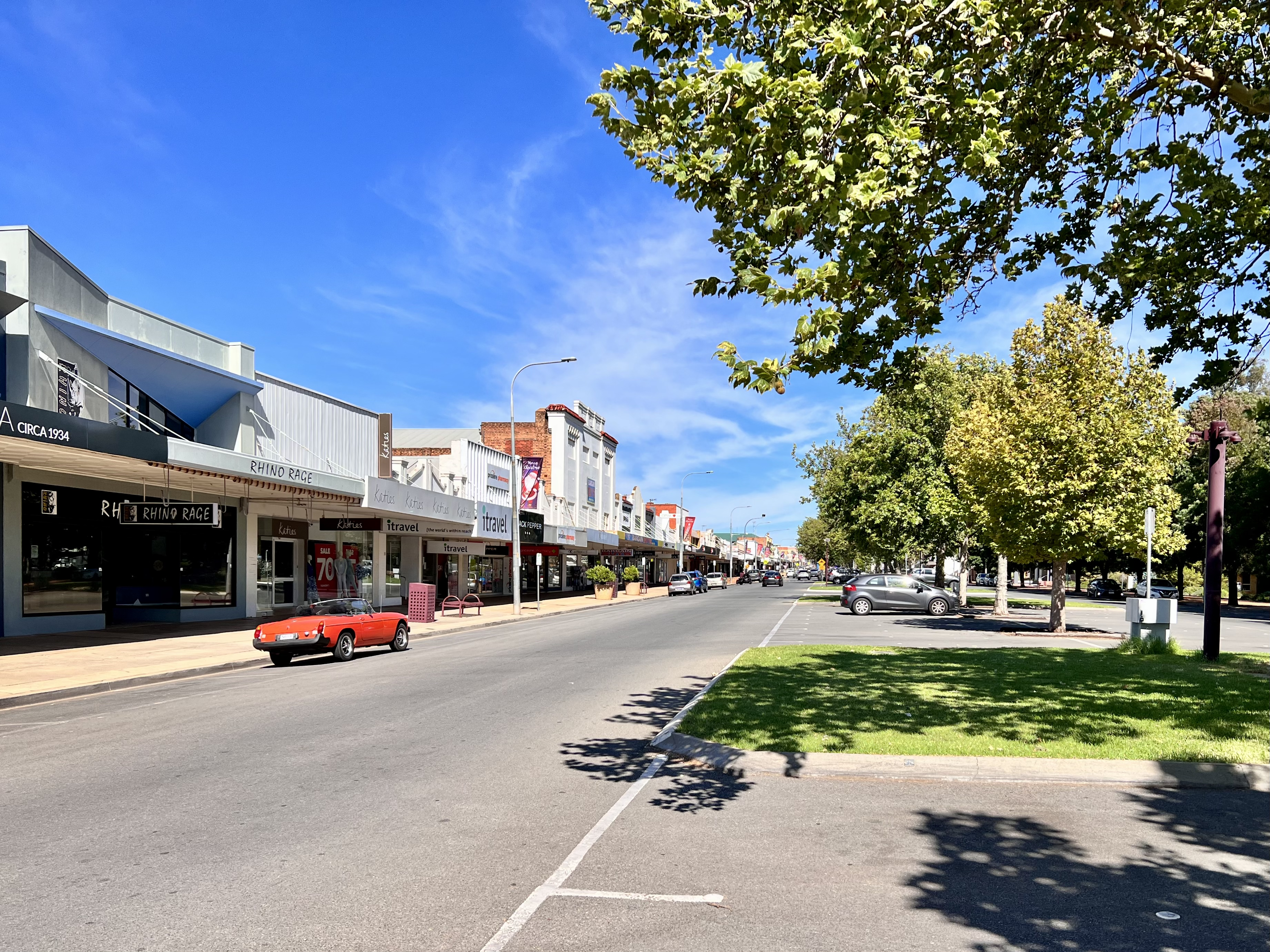
Banna Avenue, Griffith's high street

Griffith has experienced strong commercial growth in recent years. Griffith's high streets are Banna Avenue and Yambil Street but commercial growth has occurred throughout the city. Shopping centre developments include:

- Griffith City Plaza
- Griffin Plaza
- Griffith Central
- Griffith Lifestyle Centre
- The Gateway Centre
- Griffith Woolworths Complex
- Griffith City Central
- Driver Shopping Complex

=== Industrial ===
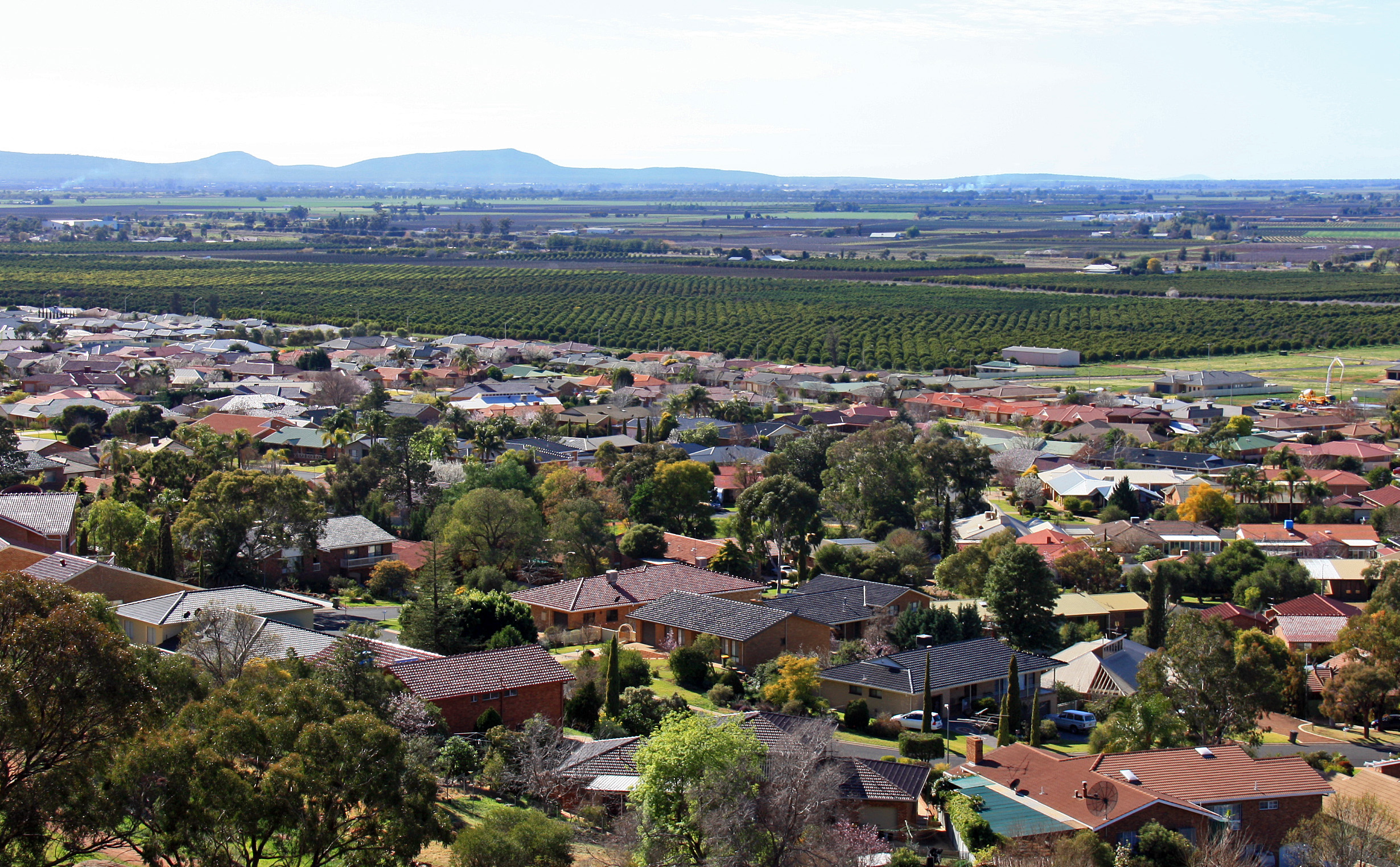
Griffith's surrounding suburbs and fields

Griffith is home to the Riverina's largest employer, poultry processor, the Baiada Group. Griffith also has several wineries, including De Bortoli Wines and Casella Family Brands (makers of Yellow Tail wine).

=== Residential ===
In addition to Griffith, the area includes the towns and villages of Willbriggie, Hanwood, Beelbangera, Bilbul, Yoogali, Widgelli, Yenda, Lake Wyangan, Tharbogang and Warburn. The city contains the main suburbs of Collina, Driver, North Griffith, East Griffith, West Griffith, South Griffith, Murrumbidgee, Mayfair, Pioneer Mooreville and Wickhams Hill. The newest development of the suburb Collina has been constructed to the north east of the city's centre.

== Demographics ==
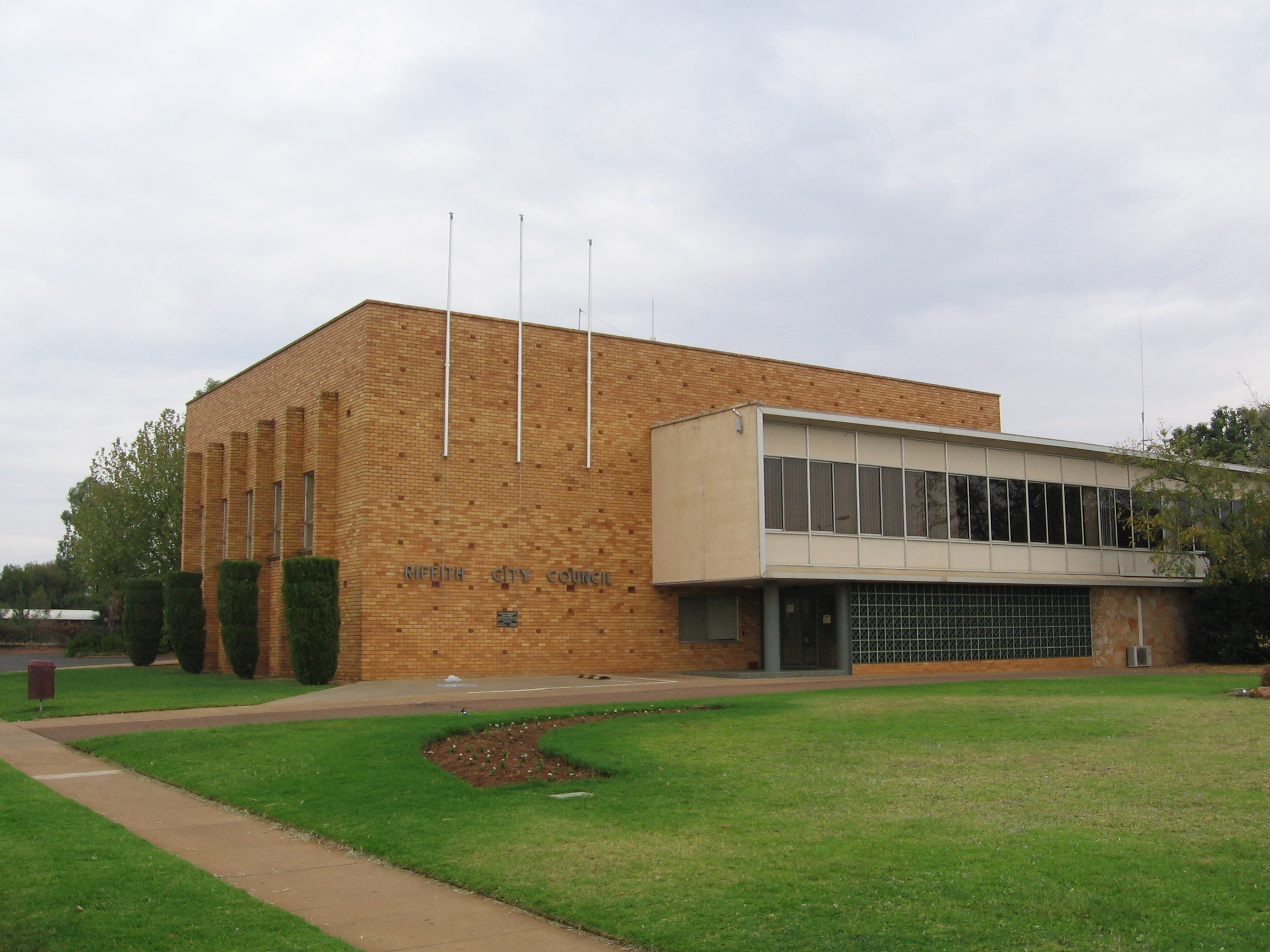
Griffith City Council

In the 2021 Census, there were 20,569 people in Griffith.

- Aboriginal and Torres Strait Islander people made up 5.8% of the population.
- The most common ancestries were Australian 26.7%, English 25.7%, Italian 22.4%, Irish 7.0% and Indian 6.4%
- 66.8% of people were born in Australia. The next most common countries of birth were India 8.8%, Italy 3.4%, Philippines 1.8%, New Zealand 1.8%, and Malaysia 1.2%.
- 65.8% of people spoke only English at home. Other languages spoken at home included Italian 5.2%, Gujarati 4.6%, Punjabi 4.4%, Samoan 1.5% and Mandarin 1.2%.
- The most common responses for religion were Catholic 34.9%, No Religion 18.0% and Anglican 10.4%.

In the forecast.id.com.au Griffith City population forecast for 2023 is 27,666, and is forecast to grow to 30,494 by 2036.

== Education ==
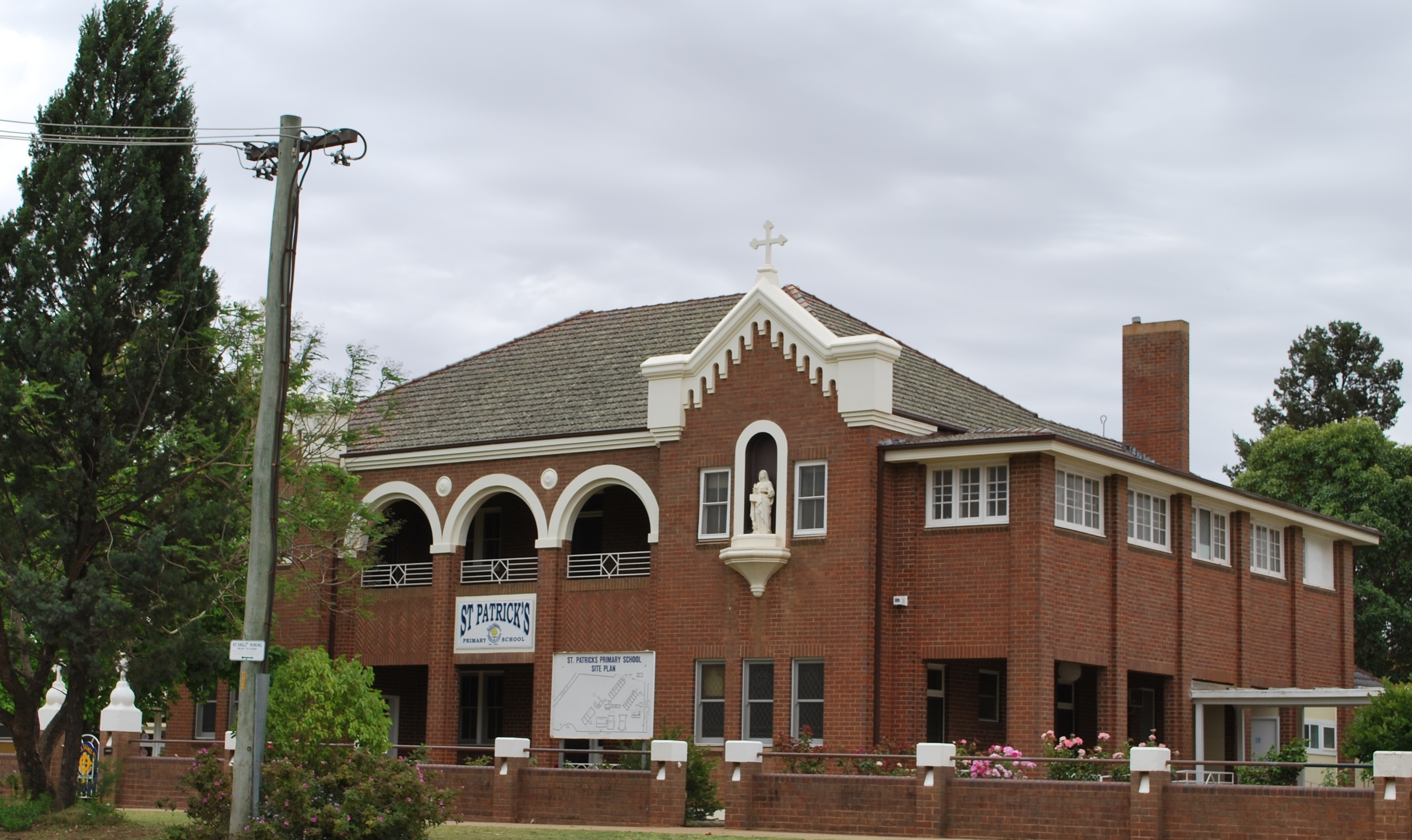
St Patricks Primary School

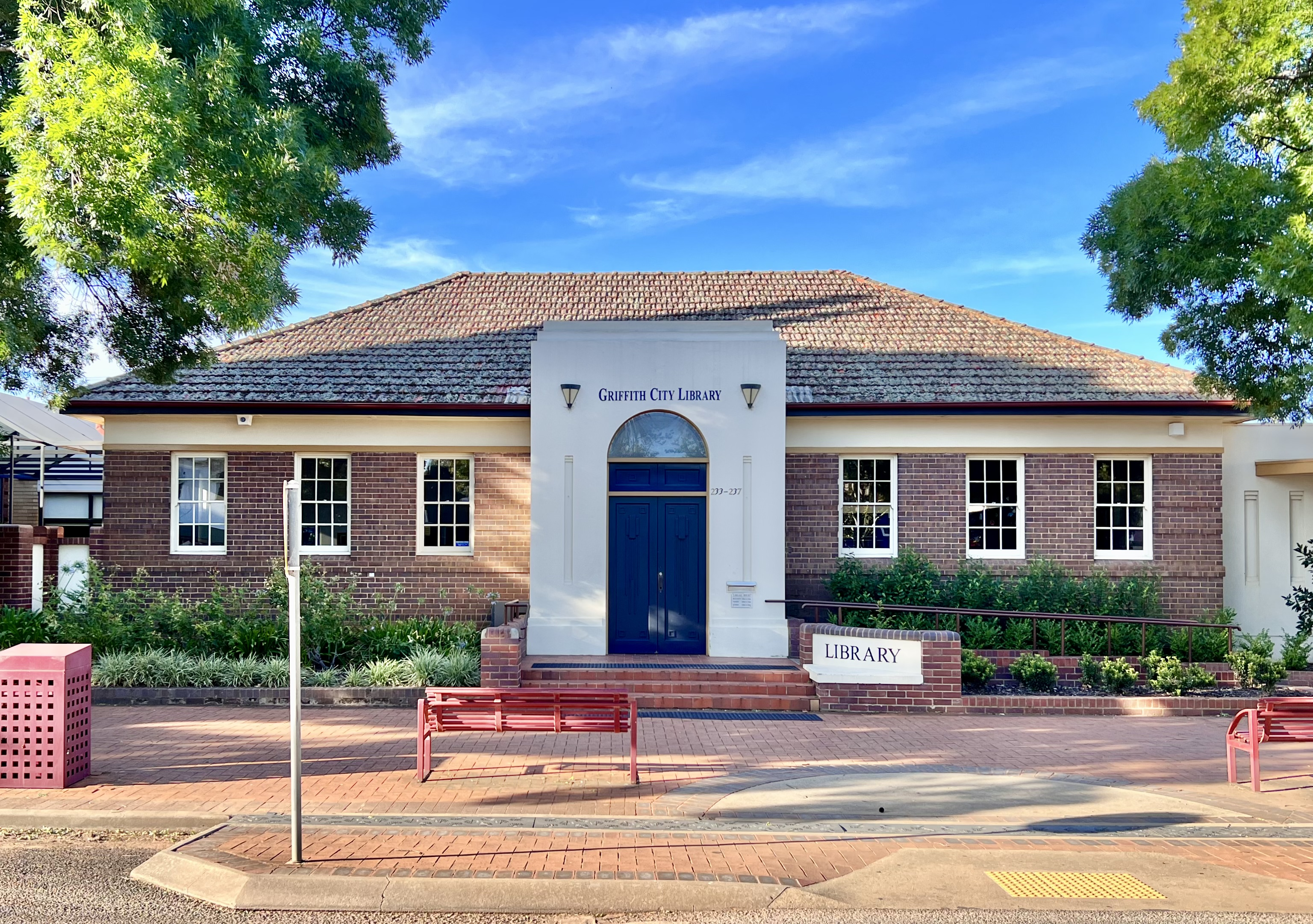
Griffith Library

Griffith is the third largest centre for education in the Riverina after Wagga Wagga and Leeton. Griffith is home to three high schools:

- Murrumbidgee Regional High School – MRHS is a merged high school, made up of two sites, formerly known as Wade High School and Griffith High School
- Marian Catholic College (formerly Catholic High School)
- Verity Christian College – established in 2021

Griffith also has 13 primary schools and various day care and pre-school facilities. Griffith has one of the largest campuses of Riverina Institute of TAFE.

== Transport ==
Griffith is a major junction for the Kidman Way, Burley Griffin Way and Irrigation Way. Griffith is located 550 km (340 mi) south west of Sydney via Burley Griffin Way and Irrigation Way and 450 km (280 mi) north of Melbourne via the Kidman Way. Griffith has daily bus services to the major metropolitan areas.

Griffith Airport has daily flights to Sydney (operated by Rex Airlines) and, from 15 July 2019, to Melbourne (operated by Sharp Airlines). There are also regular flights to Broken Hill and Narrandera.

Griffith Buslines operates buses through Griffith and surrounding towns and villages, with seven main services and routes.

The railway reached Griffith on 3 July 1916 and since that date has provided a service transporting passengers and goods to and from the area. Regular goods trains continue, making it a unique railway centre.

Griffith railway station is served by a twice weekly NSW TrainLink Xplorer service from Sydney. NSW TrainLink also operates several coach services connecting to Sydney–Melbourne XPT trains at either Wagga Wagga or Cootamundra:

- 0538 Ex. Wagga Wagga to Griffith (Saturday & Monday mornings)
- 0920 Griffith to Wagga Wagga (daily)
- 0936 Ex. Mildura to Cootamundra (daily)
- 1653 Ex. Wagga Wagga to Griffith (daily)
- 1731 Ex. Cootamundra to Mildura (daily)
- 2055 Griffith to Wagga Wagga (Friday & Sunday nights)

V/Line operates a daily rail/road coach service between Melbourne and Griffith, changing with the train at Shepparton. Melbourne (Southern Cross Station) to Griffith (Bus Terminal at Visitors Centre) is an evening service (daily), and Griffith to Melbourne service is overnight on Monday to Saturday and afternoon on Sunday. Travel time is approximately six and a half to seven hours.

In February 2010, the city's first set of traffic lights was installed at the intersection of Burrell Place and Wakaden Street to reduce traffic congestion in the Griffith CBD.

== Events ==
- Riverina Field Days, which is held annually in May.
- La Festa, Wine, Food and Multicultural Festival, which is held annually over the Easter weekend.
- Festival of Gardens, which is held annually in October
- Sikh Games, held annually on the June Long Weekend
- unWINEd, held annually on the June Long Weekend
- Multicultural Festival of Griffith – each year in October
- Festa delle Salsicce (Festival of the Sausage) – each year in August

== Media ==
=== Radio ===
Griffith is serviced by a number of commercial, community, narrowcast, SBS, and ABC stations

Local radio stations broadcasting from Griffith include ABC Riverina, AM radio commercial station Triple M Riverina MIA, FM radio commercial station Hit FM, both owned by Southern Cross Austereo and a rebroadcast from sports station Sky Sports Radio. Other local stations include Christian radio station Vision Radio Network and the community station 2MIAFM95.1. The ABC's national stations Radio National, ABC Classic, ABC NewsRadio and Triple J and the multicultural network SBS Radio are broadcast into Griffith.

ABC Riverina, is the local ABC station in Griffith, servicing the entire MIA region. It broadcasts a local breakfast show and a local morning show each weekday broadcast from the ABC studios in Wagga Wagga. Wednesday and Saturday's local morning show is also broadcast to each station on the ABC Local Radio network enabling listeners from outside of the local listening area to call into the popular gardening talk back program. ABC Riverina also has a local news service, produced by local journalists. As well as rural reports, the station also airs a local Saturday breakfast show, which is followed by a local Saturday morning sports program. Apart from local programming, ABC Riverina takes national programs like AM, Radio National's Conversations, The World Today, PM, Nightlife, Overnights, ABC Radio Grandstand, Saturday Night Country and Australia All Over along with a mid-afternoon program, an evening show and a weekend morning program, all broadcast from ABC Radio Sydney, along with a drive program, broadcast from regional NSW. Other national ABC services that are available in Griffith on separate FM frequencies include Triple J, Radio National, ABC Classic and ABC News on Radio.

Triple M Riverina MIA 963 is the Griffith-based commercial FM station owned by Southern Cross Austereo broadcasting from Griffith studios during the day, and then taking networked programming sourced from 2GB, Triple M Gold Coast, Authentic Entertainment Sydney and Triple M network. 2RG in Griffith also produces a local news service with a journalist based at the station, compiling and recording local news bulletins for 2RG and sister station 99.7 Star FM.

Hit FM, also owned by Southern Cross Austereo, is a commercial FM station servicing Griffith on a local FM frequency, although its local breakfast show is broadcast from a studio in Griffith. Hit FM is skewed towards the younger listeners with a Top 40/pop music format. Following the local breakfast show, the station takes Hit Music Network programming sourced from Southern Cross Austereo's hub at Sea FM on the Gold Coast or from metropoliton stations such as 2Day FM and Fox FM.

2MIA is the local community station, broadcasting local programs, presented by radio announcers. The station is skewed towards the older demographic and plays a lot of music. All programs are locally produced apart from the regular programming the station takes from the national community radio network.

=== Television ===
Griffith is served by five television stations, three commercial television stations which are all owned by WIN Television's owner WIN Corporation. They are AMN, MTN and MDN, which are regional affiliates of the three Australian commercial television networks (Network 10, Nine Network and Seven Network) as well as public broadcasters the ABC and SBS.

Until the 1990s, Griffith received only the ABC and MTN, an independent television station showing programmes from all three commercial networks.

The town receives the commercial networks' digital channels which are (7two, 7mate, 9Go!, 9Gem, 9Life, 10 Drama and 10 Comedy all from WIN Television), as well as TVSN, Gold, Sky News Regional, ABC Family (formerly ABC TV Plus, ABC Comedy and ABC2)/ABC Kids, ABC Entertains (formerly ABC Me and ABC3), ABC News (formerly ABC News 24), SBS Viceland (formerly SBS 2), SBS Food (formerly Food Network), SBS WorldWatch and NITV. Foxtel provides subscription satellite television services.

MTN carries programming from Seven Network, AMN carries programming from Nine Network and MDN carries programming from Network 10.

Regional news coverage of the Griffith and MIA area is provided on all three commercial networks with WIN Griffith reintroducing a local edition of WIN News in November 2025. The bulletin is presented and produced from studios in Wollongong.

=== Newspapers ===
The Area News is a daily newspaper published in the city each Monday, Wednesday, and Friday, as well as national newspapers such as The Sydney Morning Herald, The Australian, The Daily Telegraph, Herald Sun, The Weekly Times and The Age.

== Sports ==
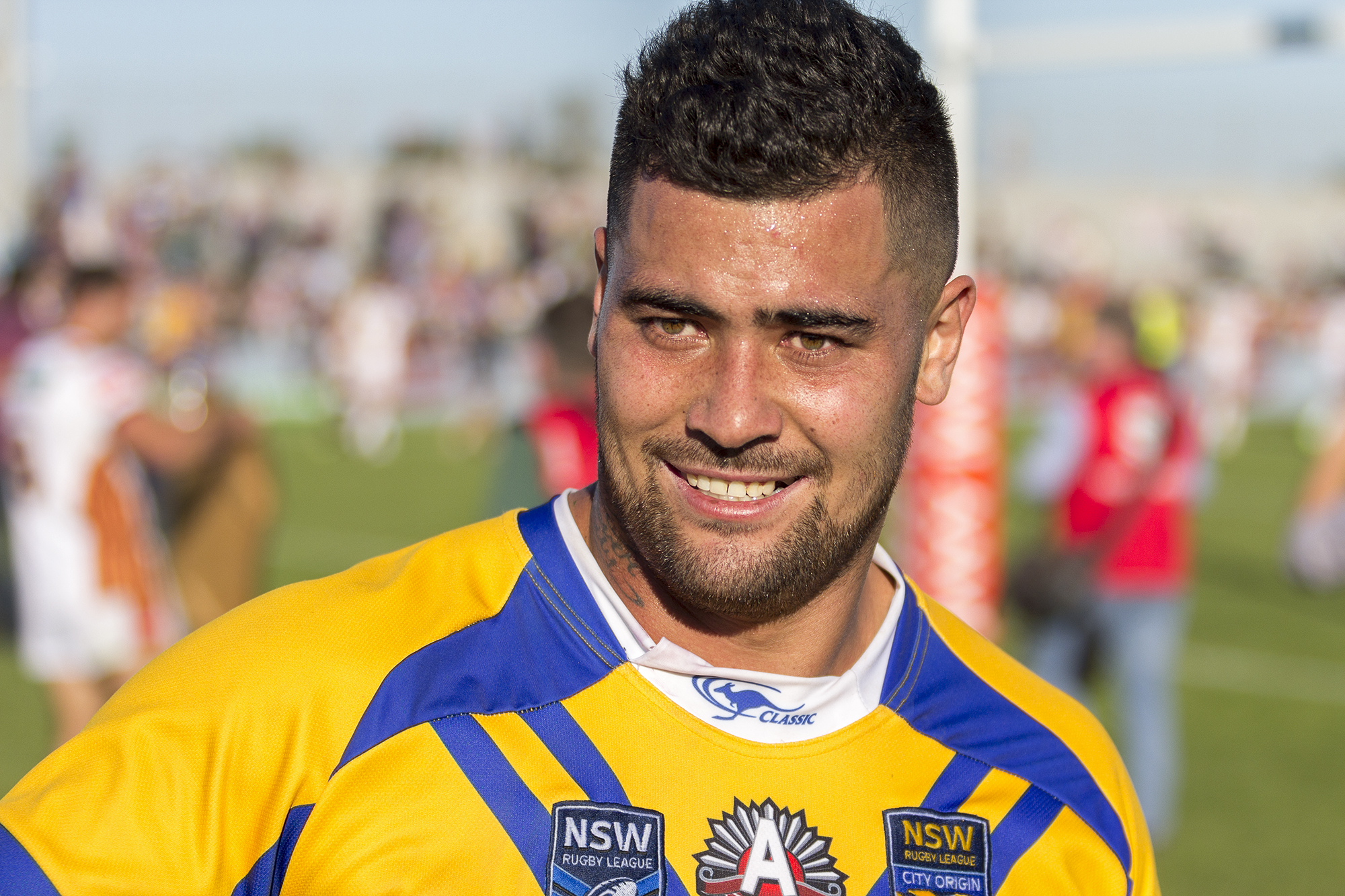
2016 NRL premiership winner Andrew Fifita is from Griffith

The most popular sport in Griffith is Rugby League. Griffith is home to two clubs in the Group 20 Rugby League competition, the Griffith Black & White Panthers, and the Griffith Waratah Tigers. The two clubs are among the most successful in the league with 6 and 13 titles respectively, with a cross-town derby in the 2017 Grand Final attracting a crowd of over 2,000 people to EW Moore Oval. A third club, the Yenda Blueheelers, based in the small town of Yenda, 15 kilometres from the city centre in the Griffith City Council area, also compete in this competition and have won 7 titles and a Clayton Cup as the best team in the state in 2009. The city has also produced many National Rugby League players, with some going on to represent their state and country.

Griffith & District Rugby League teams:

- Griffith Black & Whites
- Griffith Waratah Tigers
- Yenda Blueheelers

The Griffith and District Football Association (Soccer) comprises six participating clubs in the Griffith area – Griffith City FC, Hanwood FC, West Griffith SC, Yenda Tigers SC (seniors only), Yoogali FC and Yoogali SC. Yoogali SC also fields teams in the Capital Football competition, while Hanwood FC fields senior men's and women's teams in the Wagga competition.

The Griffith District Cricket Association (GDCA) operates a four-grade, six team premiership over the summer months across both the Twenty20, One Day and Two Day formats. Five of the six clubs (Coro Cougars, Exies Diggers, Exies Eagles, Leagues Panthers and Hanwood Wanderers) are based in Griffith itself, whilst the Coly Nomads are based in nearby Coleambally.

Griffith is also home to an Australian rules football team, the Griffith Swans, who compete in the Riverina Football League. They have won three titles, in 1952, 1968, and 2003. They previously played in the South West League. Griffith also has a rugby union team, the Griffith Blacks who play in the Southern Inland Rugby Union. The city also has strong local hockey and basketball competitions.

== Attractions ==
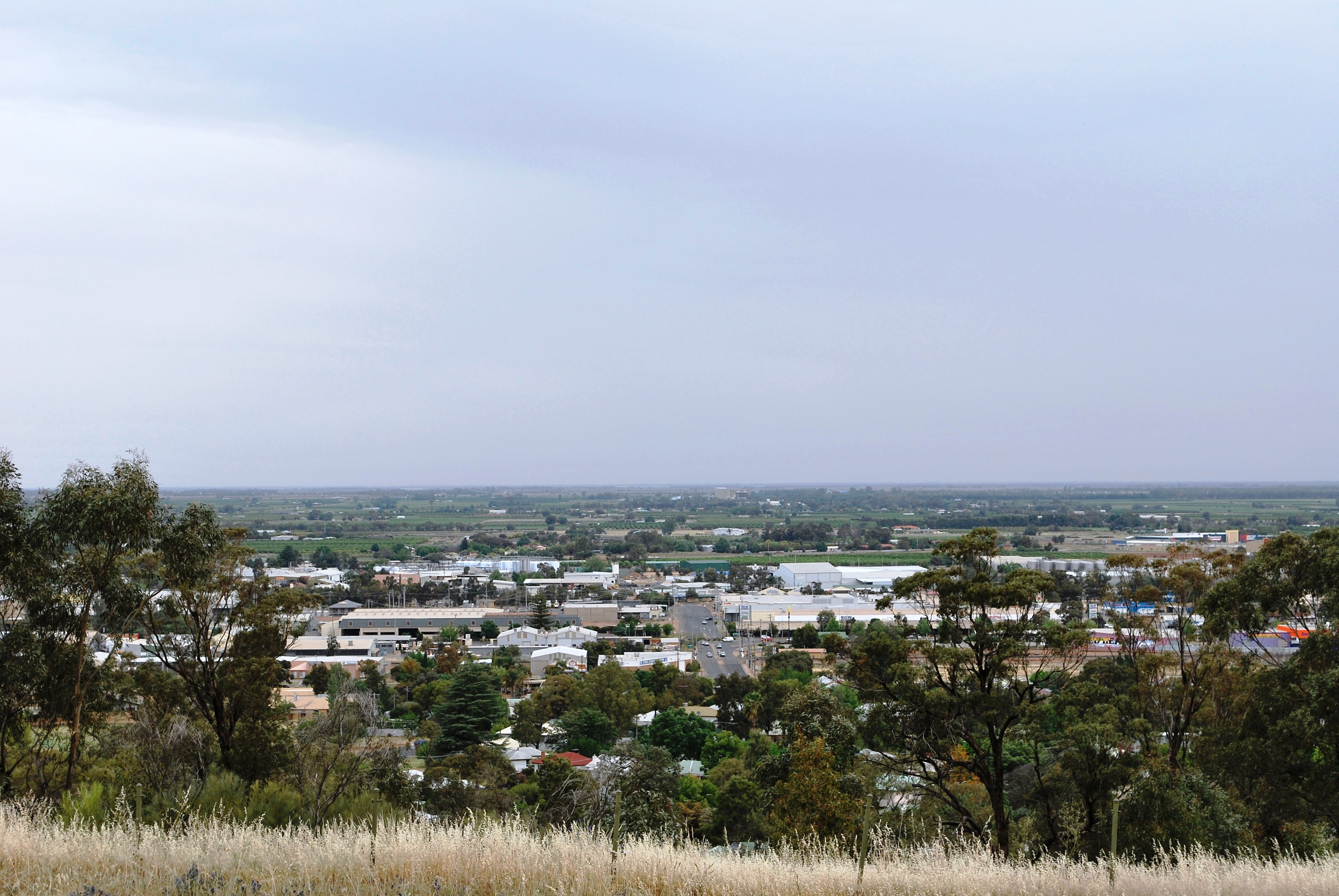
Griffith from Scenic Hill lookout

Griffith has many tourist attractions. These include Pioneer Park, a 510-seat Regional Theatre, the Italian museum, the Griffith Regional Art Gallery, craft and antique shops, and its many high standard restaurants. Many of the Griffith wineries also have wine tasting at the cellar door, notably De Bortoli Wines, Beelgara Estate (formally Rossetto Wines), West End Wines, Berton Vineyards and Warburn Estate. Griffith is famous for its botrytis including De Bortoli's Noble One, and its fortified wine such as McWilliam's Hanwood Port. Ecotourism is also available in Griffith. Scenic Hill has various walking trails, lookouts and is home to the famous Hermit's Cave. Campbells and Nericon Swamps, part of the Griffith Wetlands Important Bird Area, are important sites for migratory birds. Nearby Cocoparra National Park offers walking trails and there are opportunities to explore along the Murrumbidgee River and Lake Wyangan.

== Twin towns and sister cities ==
Griffith is twinned with:

- Harbin, China
- Comunita Montana del Grappa, Italy
- Fairfield, New South Wales, Australia

== Notable people ==
- Michael Asomua, current rugby league footballer for the Canberra Raiders
- Simon Bonetti, Australian rugby league footballer who played in the 1990s and 2000s, winning a premiership in 2002
- Ray Brown, Australian rugby league footballer who played in the 1980s
- Joseph Colpitts, Sgt, Australian Infantry. Fought in nine countries during WWII. Helped rescue many allied soldiers from occupied Crete whilst fighting with the Greek Resistance. Manager of Griffith Baths. Colpitts Place in Griffith is named in his honour.
- Eric Ferguson, Australian rugby league footballer
- Andrew Fifita, Australian rugby league footballer who scored the match winning try in the 2016 NRL Grand Final
- Geoff Foster, Australian rugby league footballer of the 1970s and 1980s
- Evonne Goolagong, World No. 1 Australian female tennis player
- Stan Grant, TV and radio presenter, journalist, writer and lecturer
- Fred Griffiths, Rhodesian-born South African international rugby league player of the 1950s and 1960s, captain-coached Griffith Black & Whites
- Michael Henderson, Australian rugby league footballer who played in the 2000s and 2010s
- Gary Higgins, former opposition leader of the Northern Territory Parliament from 2016-2020
- Greg Keenan, Australian rugby league footballer who played in the 1990s
- Mark Larkham, racing driver
- Donald Mackay, anti-drugs campaigner
- David Milne, Australian rugby league footballer who played in the 2000s and 2010s
- Laurie Moraschi, Australian rugby league footballer of the 1960s and 1970s
- Phillip Noyce, director of the 2002 film Rabbit-Proof Fence and the 2010 American film Salt
- Luke O'Dwyer, Australian rugby league footballer of the 2000s and 2010s
- John O'Neill, Australian rugby league footballer of the 1960s and 1970s
- Esava Ratugolea, Australian rules footballer
- Terry Regan, Australian rugby league footballer
- Valerio Ricetti, cave-dwelling hermit
- Harry Rowston, Australian rules footballer for the Greater Western Sydney Giants
- Robbie Simpson, Australian rugby league footballer who played in the 1990s and 2000s
- Shaun Spence, Australian rugby league footballer of the 2010s
- Robert Trimbole, Australian drug baron, organized crime boss and businessman
- Gary Warburton, Australian rugby league footballer of the 2000s and 2010s, born in Griffith
- Jason Wells, Australian rugby league footballer of the 2000s
