= Hanwood, New South Wales =

Hanwood
- Town
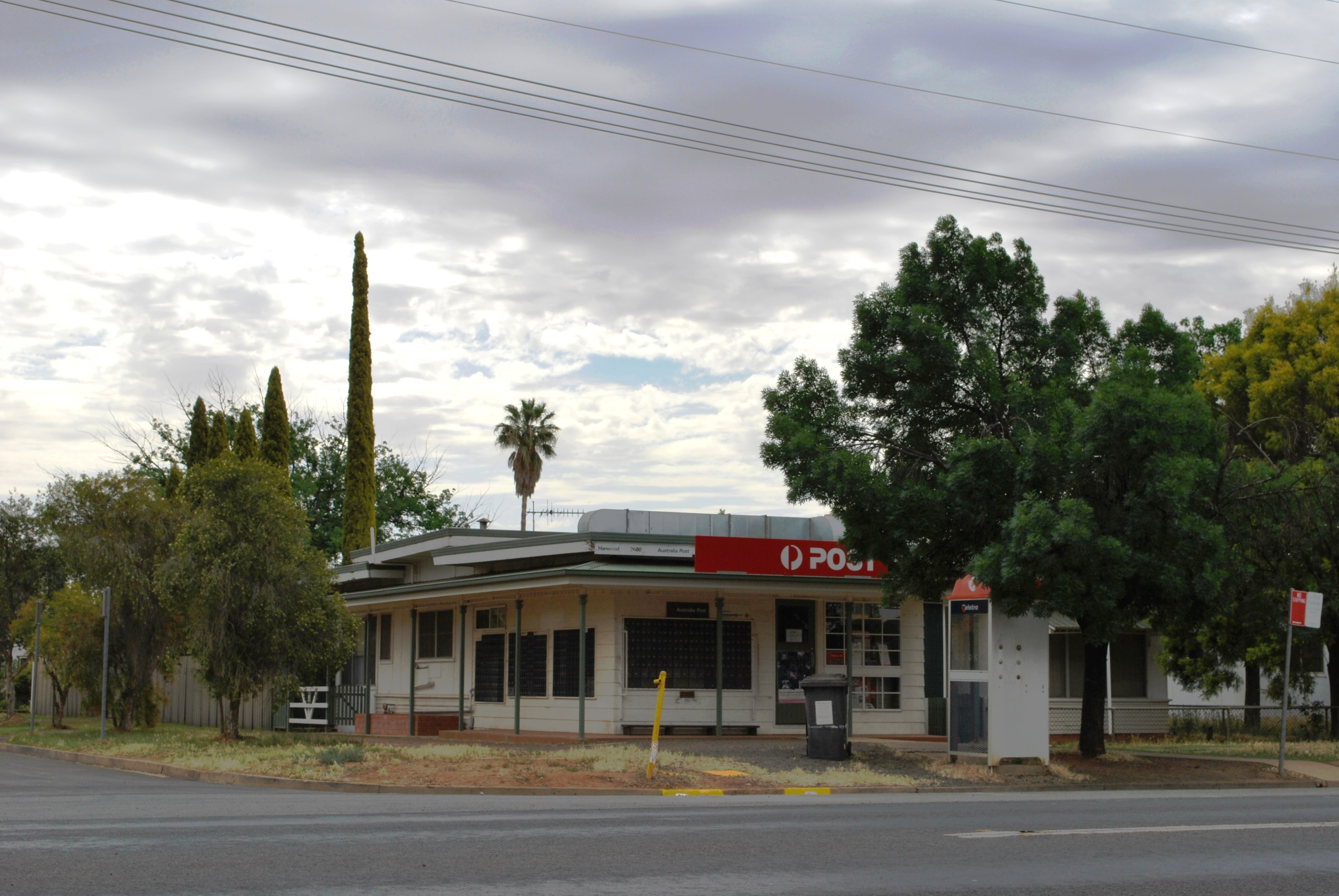
- Post office

- Coordinates: 34°20′0″S 146°02′0″E
- Country: Australia
- State: New South Wales
- LGA: City of Griffith
- Location: 5 km (3.1 mi) from Griffith

Government
  - State electorate: Murray
  - Federal division: Farrer

Population
  - Total: 1,388 (2021 census)
- Postcode: 2680
- County: Cooper

Hanwood is a town in the central Riverina region of New South Wales, Australia. The town is located 5 kilometres south of Griffith, New South Wales and is in the City of Griffith local government area. At the 2021 census, Hanwood had a population of 1,388.

Hanwood Post Office opened on 1 January 1921.

Hanwood is known for its wineries, in particular the McWilliam's winery established in 1913. In 1973 the Big Wine Barrel was completed, forming the cellar door tasting rooms. They have a wide array of wines, bottles and memorabilia displayed in the 17m long museum.

== Culture ==
Hanwood has two sporting clubs, the Hanwood Wanderers Cricket Club, who compete in the Griffith District Cricket Association, and soccer team Hanwood FC, who compete in both the local Griffith District Football Association and Football Wagga Wagga competitions.

The town also formerly had a rugby league team, the Hanwood Warriors, who folded just after the turn of the century. The club played in the Group 17 Rugby League competition.
