= Lake Wyangan =

Lake in the state of New South Wales, Australia

- Location within New South Wales
- Location: New South Wales
- Coordinates: 34.218297°S 146.02139°E
- Basin countries: Australia

Lake Wyangan is a recreational lake located immediately to the northwest of the town of Griffith in New South Wales, Australia. The lake was formed in 1950 and is surrounded by many orchards. It was formed with the remnants of a gypsum mine. There was a natural swamp at the location. The lake is a popular attraction for tourists and locals alike. It is popular for many activities such as boating, fishing, skiing, sailing, picnicking, walking, jogging, running, driving and other activities. There are also some animals in the area such as deer fenced off in secure enclosures. There is also a children's playground. Lake Wyangan is one of the component wetlands of the Griffith Wetlands Important Bird Area.
