= Griffith Wetlands Important Bird Area =

Important Bird Area in New South Wales, Australia

Coordinates: 34°09′42″S 145°51′21″E

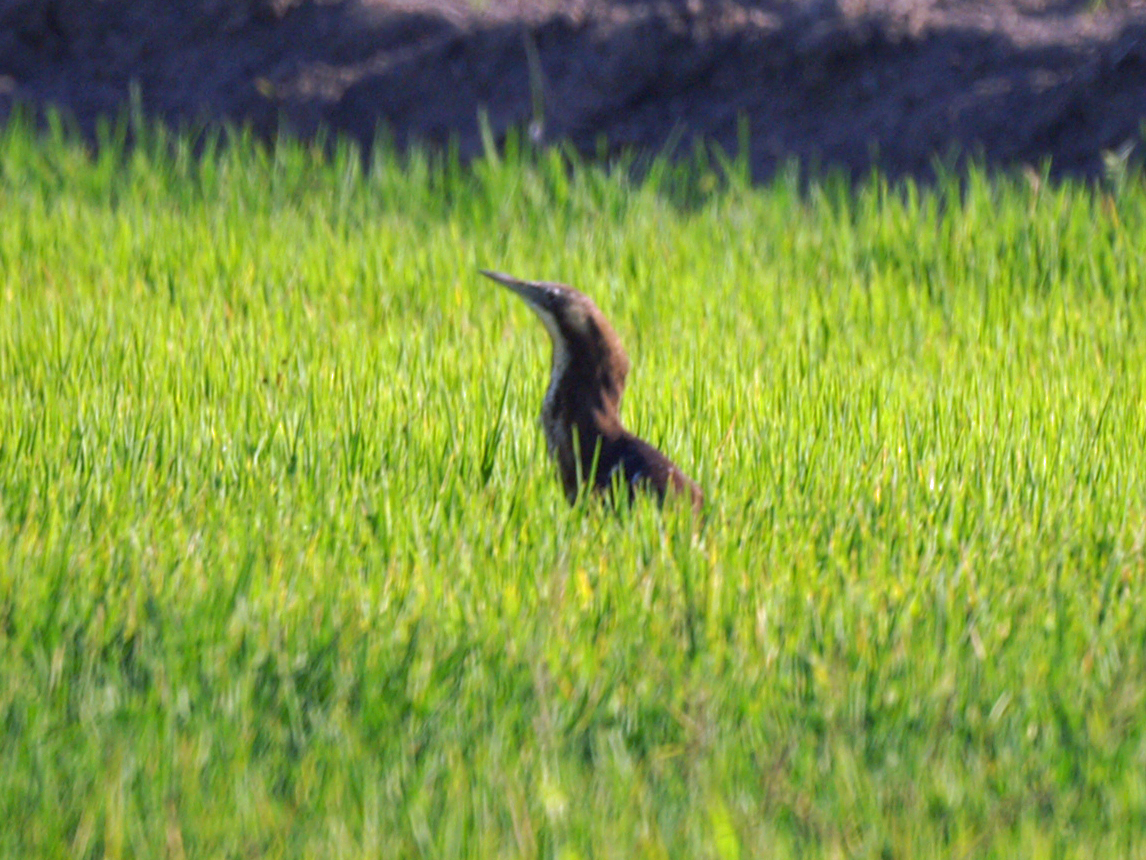
The IBA is an important site for Australasian bitterns

The Griffith Wetlands Important Bird Area is a group of wetlands lying close to the Riverina town of Griffith in southern New South Wales, Australia. It lies within the Murrumbidgee Irrigation Area.

== Description ==
North and South Lake Wyangan are used for water storage; they contain an area of cumbungi. Nericon Swamp is a shallow swamp usually dry enough to be grazed by cattle, though it sometimes fills from local rains when it supports large numbers of waders. Barren Box Swamp was originally an ephemeral swamp; it has been divided into three parts, with 60% of it remaining a natural wetland which holds water only in wet years; the other 40% is used for water storage and recycling, with reed beds and grazed margins. Campbell's Swamp is a black box-lignum swamp containing extensive open areas punctuated by stands of reeds and cumbungi; it fills occasionally from local rainfall or with water released from the irrigation system.

== Birds ==
Together, the wetlands have been identified by BirdLife International as a fragmented 38 km^{2} (15 sq mi) Important Bird Area (IBA) because they regularly support small numbers of the endangered Australasian bittern as well as occasionally supporting over 1% of the world populations of sharp-tailed sandpipers, red-necked avocets and chestnut teals.
