= Maʼalpiku Island National Park =

National park in Queensland, Australia

- IUCN category II (national park)
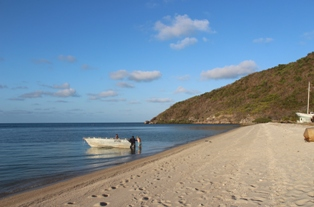
- Restoration Island, Cape York

- Location within Queensland
- Location: Queensland
- Nearest city: Lockhart River
- Coordinates: 12.618°S 143.449°E
- Area: 26 ha (64 acres)
- Established: 1989
- Governing body: Queensland Parks and Wildlife Service
- Website: Official website

Maʼalpiku Island National Park is a national park at Iron Range in the Shire of Cook in Far North Queensland, Australia. It lies 1,928 km (1,198 mi) northwest of Brisbane and a few hundred metres (yards) from Cape Weymouth and the Kutini-Payamu National Park. The park includes part of Maʼalpiku Island, also known as Restoration Island, and nearby Restoration Rock. The traditional owners of the park are the Kuuku Ya’u people.

== Environment ==
The continental island rises to 116 m (380'). The landscape features granite boulders, closed scrub, open paperbark scrub and wind-sheared heath.

== History ==
On 29 May 1789, after the mutiny on the Bounty, Captain Bligh and the men who remained loyal to him arrived on the island in the ship's boat. This was the first Australian island they came to, and he named it Restoration Island because the food they found (oysters and native fruits) greatly restored their spirits and because that date was Oak Apple Day, the anniversary of the restoration of King Charles II (in 1660).

Bligh saw evidence of the local Aboriginal people using the island. He also saw kangaroo tracks and wondered if the Aboriginal people brought them from the mainland to breed, since they would be easier to catch later in the confined space of an island.

In 2024, the national park was one of a number of sites on Cape York Peninsula to be proposed to be listed as UNESCO World Heritage.

== David Glasheen ==
Until his death in 2025, one third of Restoration Island was leased to David Glasheen, a former mining tycoon, who, after losing his fortune during the 1987 stock market crash, decided to live a solitary existence on the island.

Glasheen lived in a renovated World War II outpost on Ma'alpiku Island with solar-powered internet access and a mobile phone. He also had a small boat for reaching the mainland whenever necessary and several times a year he made a trip to the mainland for groceries. He gathered bananas and coconuts from the island; caught crabs, fish, and oysters; and had a fruit and vegetable garden.

In July 2019, Glasheen and Neil Bramwell released The Millionaire Castaway, published by Affirm Press, detailing Glasheen's experiences of being a castaway on Restoration Island for then 22 years.

== Traditional owners ==
The island contains places of cultural significance to the traditional owners. In 2009, formal native title was granted over the island to the Kuuku Ya’u people. The park is now jointly managed between the Northern Kuuku Ya’u Kanthanampu Aboriginal Corporation RNTBC Land Trust and the Government of Queensland.

== Access ==
Access to the national park is provided by private boat only.

== See also ==
- Protected areas of Queensland
