= Temora =

Temora may refer to:

- Temora Shire
  - Temora, New South Wales, a town in Australia
    - Temora Aviation Museum, a museum in the Australian town of Temora
    - Temora Post Office, historic commonwealth heritage site in Temora
    - Temora Herald and Mining Journal
    - Temora Airport
- Temora (Ellicott City, Maryland), listed on the NRHP in Maryland
- Temora (poem), a 1763 poem by James Macpherson
- Temora (crustacean), a genus of copepods in the family Temoridae
