= Ariah Park News =

Ariah Park News was a weekly English language newspaper published in Temora, New South Wales, Australia, between 1923 and approximately 1942.

Ariah Park News, 5 April 1923

== Publication history ==
The paper was first published on 5 April 1923 by Norman Scott. It was a weekly newspaper, circulated in "every Centre Between Temora and Ardlethan". It ceased publication in approximately 1942.

== Digitisation ==
The paper has been digitised as part of the Australian Newspapers Digitisation Program of the National Library of Australia.

== See also ==
- List of newspapers in New South Wales
- List of newspapers in Australia
