= Advance Airlines =

Australian airline

IATA	ICAO	Call sign
DR	-	-
- Founded: 1974
- Ceased operations: 1981
- Fleet size: 5 - Beech 200
- Headquarters: Sydney, Australia
- Key people: Bryan Greenberger (Founder)

Advance Airlines was an Australian airline that operated from 1974 to 1981. It was run by former bush pilot Bryan Greenberger.

== History ==
It had come into existence in 1974 when Greenberger had successfully tendered for the Sydney to Lord Howe Island route that had been vacated when Ansett Airlines subsidiary Airlines of New South Wales had withdrawn its flying boat service, but lacked an aircraft to operate it. He went into partnership with Sydney builder Alan Griffin, which gave him access to a Beechcraft airplane, and they commenced what became a lucrative operation. The company was half-owned by Greenberger and half-owned by the Griffin family, with Greenberger as managing director, Griffin as chairman, and Griffin's son-in-law Jim Read as director. The airline saw an early incident in 1976 when a Lord Howe Island flight was forced to return to Sydney Airport after takeoff when a damaged engine resulted in smoke coming from the engine and pieces of metal falling from the plane.

By 1978, the airline had four aircraft, was operating from a converted hangar at Sydney Airport. In that year, it also operated flights within New South Wales to Lord Howe Island, Temora, Condobolin, Scone, Quirindi, Gunnedah and Wee Waa. It had recently expanded to operate discount flights to Toowoomba in Queensland in competition with major airlines and an existing regional carrier; these reportedly "proved particularly popular". Their operation was based on the "no-frills" style of English entrepreneur Freddie Laker, with no food or drink or hostess. The company launched an aggressive advertising campaign in Sydney newspapers in 1978, and Greenberger had expansion plans to Geelong in Victoria and the Sunshine Coast in Queensland if the Toowoomba route succeeded. He had also speculated that Advance could become a third major domestic carrier alongside Ansett Airlines and Trans Australia Airlines were Australia's dual-airline system to collapse.

By 1981, the airline had been sold to and folded into Aviation Developments Operations, one of a number of commuter airline purchases by the newer airline, associated with retail financier General Credits, who would themselves soon be taken over by Australian Guarantee Corporation.

== Fleet ==
In 1980 Advance Airlines had a fleet of:

- 5 - Beechcraft Super King Air

== Incidents and accidents ==
- On 21 February 1980, the airline's scheduled passenger flight Advance Airlines Flight DR4210 crashed at Sydney Airport after an engine failure on takeoff, killing all 13 people on board the Beech Beechcraft King Air 200. The crash resulted in a 1982 board of inquiry which made a number of recommendations about airline safety in Australia. In 1982, an investigation by the board of inquiry into the 1980 crash into confusion regarding the corporate ownership and company structure of the former Advance Airlines narrowly allowed legal claims for damages to be launched within the statutory period of limitations.
- In December 1980 the airline had a subsequent incident, while still in operation, when a pilot collapsed unconscious while operating a Lord Howe Island flight, which resulted in a passenger having to take control of the aircraft to avoid a crash, and made front-page news in Sydney.

== See also ==
- List of defunct airlines of Australia
- Aviation in Australia
