= Temora Herald and Mining Journal =

Australian newspaper of the 19th century

The Temora Herald and Mining Journal, also published as the Temora Herald, was a semi-weekly English language newspaper, published from 1880 to 1883 in Temora, New South Wales, Australia.

Front page of Temora Herald and Mining Journal, 21 April 1882

== History ==
The Temora Herald and Mining Journal was first published by William Hentry Leighton Bailey on 29 July 1880. It was semi-weekly, published every Tuesday and Friday. It claimed to be "the oldest newspaper published on the rich goldfields of Temora and is the popular Journal with the mining community, business men, and selectors of the district." It ceased publication on 6 April 1883.

== Digitisation ==
Some issues of the Temora Herald and Mining Journal have been digitised as part of the Australian Newspapers Digitisation Program of the National Library of Australia.

== See also ==
- List of newspapers in Australia
- List of newspapers in New South Wales
