= Temora Airport =

Airport at Temora, New South Wales, Australia

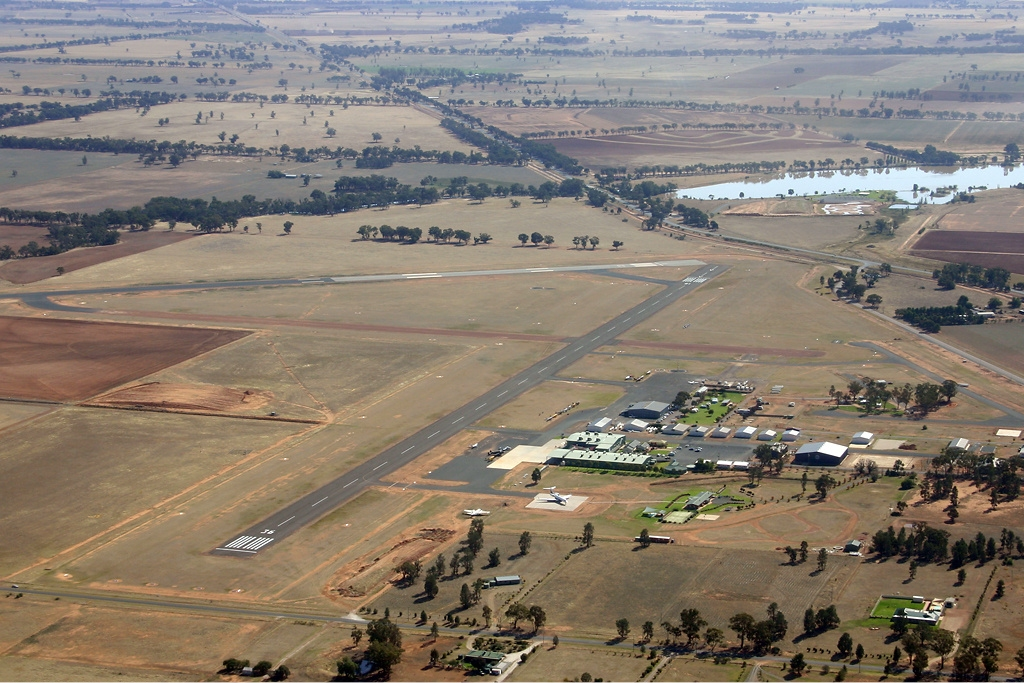
- IATA: TEM; ICAO: YTEM

Summary
- Airport type: Public
- Operator: Temora Shire Council
- Location: Temora, New South Wales
- Elevation AMSL: 921 ft (281 m)
- Coordinates: 34°25′18″S 147°30′42″E

Map
- Location in New South Wales

Runways
Direction	Length		Surface
Direction	m	ft	Surface
05/23	2,040	6,693	Asphalt
18/36	1,468	4,816	Asphalt
09/27	840	2,756	Gravel
- Sources: Australian AIP and aerodrome chart

Temora Airport (IATA: TEM, ICAO: YTEM) is a small airport located 2 nautical miles (3.7 km; 2.3 mi) northwest of Temora, New South Wales, Australia. Currently no regularly scheduled passenger fights serve the airport. The current owner, the Temora Shire Council, do not charge landing fees for aircraft to use the facility, encouraging a wide variety of general aviation uses, including skydiving, gliding, flight training, kit aircraft assembly and aircraft maintenance. It is also the home of the Temora Aviation Museum, and hosts regularly flying displays and events.

== History ==
Due to the Temora area's favourable climate and geography, following the outbreak of World War II the airport was controlled by the Royal Australian Air Force and in 1941 No. 10 Elementary Flying Training School (10EFTS) was established to provide initial flight training for pilot graduates. During the unit's operation, the airfield was extended significantly, processing some 2527 graduates. At its peak in 1944, 97 de Havilland Tiger Moth aircraft were based at the school. After World War II, the airfield was handed to the Department of Civil Aviation.

Following the war, in 1946, local veterans and pilots founded the Temora Aero Club, utilising a Bellman Hangar as a club house. This hangar is still maintained by the club. Club members have been instrumental in the improvement and development of the airport facilities. One such club member is David Lowy, 1998 Australian Aerobatics Champion, who later founded the Temora Aviation Museum.

A 1991 reunion of TENEFTS personnel saw 71 de Havilland Tiger Moths flown to Temora to commemorate the 50th anniversary of the unit's establishment. Many of these aircraft had been based with the school

In November 2004, the Temora Shire Council completed a $3.8 million upgrade to the airport, opening the new 2,040 m (6,690 ft) runway 05/23. The new runway allows the airport to handle aircraft as large as a Boeing 737-800 narrow-body jet and provides more flexibility for aircraft operations at night and in variable wind conditions. An official ceremony was attended by Prime Minister John Howard on 16 September 2006 to open the runway and acknowledge the achievements of the Temora Aviation Museum.

== Accidents and incidents ==
- Advance Airlines Flight DR4210 crashed at Sydney Airport shortly after takeoff on a scheduled flight to Temora on 21 February 1980. 13 people were killed in the accident, the 12 passengers were all residents of the Temora district.

== See also ==
- List of airports in New South Wales
