= Nan Fullarton =

Australian artist and writer

- Born: Nancy Edith Fullarton; 15 July 1913; Temora, New South Wales, Australia
- Died: 11 April 2000 (aged 86); London, England
- Education: Sydney Technical College
- Occupations: Artist, writer, illustrator, costume designer

Nancy Edith Fullarton (15 July 1913 – 11 April 2000) was an Australian artist, writer, illustrator, and ballet costume designer.

== Early life ==
Nancy Edith Fullarton was born in Temora, New South Wales on 15 July 1913, to John and Lilian Fullarton. The family moved to Sydney while Fullarton was still a child. She attended Sydney Girls’ High School and later studied art at Sydney Technical College. Fullarton worked as a commercial artist in Sydney, going on to have her own studio and employing assistants.

In 1937, Fullarton married Paul Denny, with whom she had a daughter.

== Career ==
Fullarton's first book, The Alphabet from A to Z, was published in 1946, selling 50,000 copies. Her art and writing focused on Australian animals. The Alphabet was followed by A Day in the Bush, a collection of nursery rhymes.

As well as her children’s books, Fullarton created comic strips. A three-month trial of Frisky in the Sydney Morning Herald in 1948 became a permanent feature in the Sunday Herald. Fullarton also adapted and illustrated a comic strip version of Lewis Carroll’s Alice in Wonderland stories. Her Frisky strips were published as a book in 1956, as well as being made into an educational film by the New South Wales Education Department. Another strip created by Fullarton, The World of Animals, was published across Australia and in Europe.

In 1955, Fullerton moved with her daughter to London. In retirement, she worked in a London ballet company founded by her daughter, Christina, and son-in-law, the dancer-choreographer Alexander Roy. She designed programs, publicity materials, and costumes.

In 1970, Fullarton married Italian-British restaurateur, Rene Bassett, who died in 1982. A stroke in 1998 left her partly incapacitated, and following a further stroke, Fullarton died in London on 11 April 2000.
