= Raymond Hogan =

Australian cricketer (1932–1995)

Personal information
- Full name: Raymond Patrick Hogan
- Born: 8 May 1932; Temora, New South Wales, Australia
- Died: 25 November 1995 (aged 63); Pine Rivers, Queensland, Australia
- Batting: Right-handed
- Bowling: Right-arm fast-medium

Domestic team information
- Years: Team
- 1954–1955: Northamptonshire

Career statistics
Competition	First-class
Matches	3
Runs scored	18
Batting average	4.50
100s/50s	–/–
Top score	8
Balls bowled	372
Wickets	3
Bowling average	72.66
5 wickets in innings	–
10 wickets in match	–
Best bowling	2/16
Catches/stumpings	2/–
- Source: Cricinfo, 16 November 2011

Raymond Patrick Hogan (8 May 1932 – 25 November 1995) was an Australian cricketer. Hogan was a right-handed batsman who bowled right-arm fast-medium. He was born at Temora, New South Wales.

Hogan played all his first-class cricket in England, making three appearances for Northamptonshire against Cambridge University in 1954, and Yorkshire and Gloucestershire in 1955. He had little success in these matches, scoring just 18 runs at an average of 4.50, with a high score of 8, and taking 3 wickets at a bowling average of 72.66, with best figures of 2/16.

He died at Pine Rivers, Queensland on 25 November 1995.
