= Col Ratcliff =

Australian rugby league footballer (1929–2026)

Personal information
- Full name: Colin Noel Ratcliff
- Born: 23 June 1929 Temora, New South Wales, Australia
- Died: 2 April 2026 (aged 96) Sydney, Australia

Playing information
- Position: Centre
Club
| Years | Team | Pld | T | G | FG | P |
|---|---|---|---|---|---|---|
| 1952–1955 | Western Suburbs | 37 | 15 | 0 | 0 | 45 |
Representative
| Years | Team | Pld | T | G | FG | P |
| 1952 | NSW City | 1 | 0 | 0 | 0 | 0 |
| 1958 | NSW Country | 1 | 0 | 0 | 0 | 0 |

Colin Noel Ratcliff (23 June 1929 – 2 April 2026) was an Australian rugby league footballer who played in the 1950s. He played for Western Suburbs in the New South Wales Rugby League (NSWRL) competition.

== Background ==
Ratcliff was born in Temora, New South Wales, Australia on 23 June 1929. He played his junior rugby league for West Wyalong and played in the 1951 Group 9 grand final against Cootamundra which West Wyalong lost. It was around the same time that Ratcliff gained the attention of Western Suburbs who signed him after a successful trial.

== Playing career ==
Ratcliff made his debut for Western Suburbs against St George in Round 1 1952 scoring a hat-trick in a 31–30 victory at Kogarah Oval. Western Suburbs would go on to win the minor premiership in 1952 and reach the grand final against South Sydney. The match was remembered due to its controversy with claims the referee George Bishop had put a big wager on Wests winning the game. Souths claimed that they were denied two fair tries and Wests had scored one try off a blatant knock on. Western Suburbs ran out winners in the grand final 22–10. This would prove to be the last premiership Western Suburbs would win as a stand alone entity before exiting the competition in 1999. Ratcliff recalled his memories of the game saying "Peter McLean our captain said behind the goals after Souths scored "if we don’t start to play fair dinkum we will lose this game".

In 1953, Western Suburbs only managed five wins all year and finished last on the table claiming the wooden spoon. As of the 2019 season, Wests are the last team to have won a premiership and then finished last the following year. The only other team to have experienced a similar fate were Canterbury-Bankstown in 1942 and 1943. Ratcliff played with Western Suburbs up until the end of the 1955 season where the club finished last again. Ratcliff then moved back to the country and captain-coached West Wyalong. Ratcliff also played for Griffith between 1957 and 1958.

== Death and legacy ==
In 2010, Ratcliff was named in NSW Group 9's team of the century. He died in Sydney on 2 April 2026, at the age of 96.
