= Boginderra Hills Nature Reserve =

Nature reserve in New South Wales, Australia

- IUCN category Ia (strict nature reserve)
- Location within New South Wales
- Location: New South Wales
- Nearest city: Temora
- Coordinates: 34°16′28″S 147°37′45″E
- Area: 7.56 km^{2} (2.92 sq mi)
- Established: 1982
- Governing body: NSW National Parks & Wildlife Service
- Website: http://www.nationalparks.nsw.gov.au/visit-a-park/parks/Boginderra-Hills-Nature-Reserve

Boginderra Hills Nature Reserve is a protected nature reserve situated to the north of Temora, located in the Riverina region of New South Wales in eastern Australia. It has an area of 756 hectares.

== History ==
The reserve was formed in 1982 when NSW Parks and Wildlife purchased 551 hectares of mainly forested granite hill, recognising the conservation value of the area. In August 2005, an additional 205 hectares of adjacent and similar hill country were purchased and added to the reserve.

== Geology ==
The reserve covers the Boginderra Hills, which form the main ridge of the Nurraburra Hills. Its highest point rises to 494 metres above sea level. These hills are made of Boginderra granite, which was formed from cooling magma bodies from deep within the earth. These bodies, known as plutons, then lifted through the crust to their current positions. This occurred around 370 million years ago (in the Late Devonian period). The granites in the Nurraburra Hills are around 77% silicon dioxide (SiO_{2}) and 11% aluminum oxide (Al_{2}O_{3}), with a range of other metal oxides present. No mining surveys have been conducted, however drilling has been completed in other hills in the Nurraburra complex which has shown the presence of some rare earth elements, however none in any economic quantity.

== Biology ==
=== Flora ===
Plant life is typical of the area, including eucalypt, callitris and acacia species (amongst others) covering a range of native shrubs, grasses and ground covers. Key populations present in the reserve include:

- Tumbledown red gum (Eucalyptus dealbata), red stringybark (Eucalyptus macrorhyncha) in the creeklines and areas with deeper soils
- Tick bush (Kunzea sp. D) and drooping sheoak (Allocasuarina verticillata) on the eastern and southern sides where the soil is shallower and rockier
- Dwyer's red gum (Eucalyptus dwyeri), black cypress pine (Callitris endlicheri) and currawang (Acacia doratoxylon), found on rocky soils and exposed aspects.
- White box (Eucalyptus albens) and yellow box (Eucalyptus melliodora) in the north east

Kurrajong trees (Brachychiton populneus) are interspersed across the reserve

There are two plant species of conservation significance in the reserve, Brunonia australis, a small blue-flowering annual, and Mitrasacme paradoxa, a small perennial herb.

=== Fauna ===
Animal life is reasonably diverse. Observed species include:

==== Mammals ====
- Short-beaked echidna (Tachyglossus aculeatus)
- Common brushtail possum (Trichosurus vulpecula)
- Eastern grey kangaroo (Macropus giganteus)
- Swamp wallaby (Wallabia bicolor)
- Red-necked wallaby (Macropus rufogriseus)

No survey targeting bats or small mammals has been undertaken, so no species have yet been recorded.

==== Birds ====
At least 65 species have been observed in the reserve, and an additional 69 in the surrounding areas many of which are likely to occur within the reserve. Threatened species recorded include:

- Turquoise parrot (Neophema pulchella)
- Speckled warbler (Pyrrholaemus sagittatus)
- Brown treecreeper (Climacteris picumnus)
- Grey-crowned babbler (eastern subspecies) (Pomatostomus temporalis temporalis).

==== Reptiles and amphibians ====
- Southern shiny-tailed gecko (Diplodactylus intermedius)
- Tree dtella (Gehyra variegata)
- Thick-tailed gecko (Underwoodisaurus milii)
- Nobbi lashtail (Amphibolurus nobbi)
- Tree-crevice skink (Egernia striolata)
- Shiny-palmed shining skink (Cryptoblepharus carnabyi)

== Human use ==
Like many of the surrounding hill areas, the Boginderra Hills may have seen light use by Aboriginal Australians for various purposes (though evidence has yet been found). Immediately prior to the formation of the reserve, the land had been used for livestock grazing. Cropping was impossible on the rocky and hilly terrain and so no substantial land clearing had taken place on the hill itself (compared to the plains that surround it). A trigonometric station, called Nurraburra, was placed on the hill by the Central Mapping Authority (now part of NSW Land and Property Information). Since formation of the reserve, human use has been limited to recreational use. No trails have been formed in the reserve and NSW Parks and Wildlife service do not intend to create facilities, so as to limit the impact of public visitation on the flora and fauna.

== See also ==
- Protected areas of New South Wales
