= Advance Airlines Flight 4210 =

1980 aviation accident in Sydney

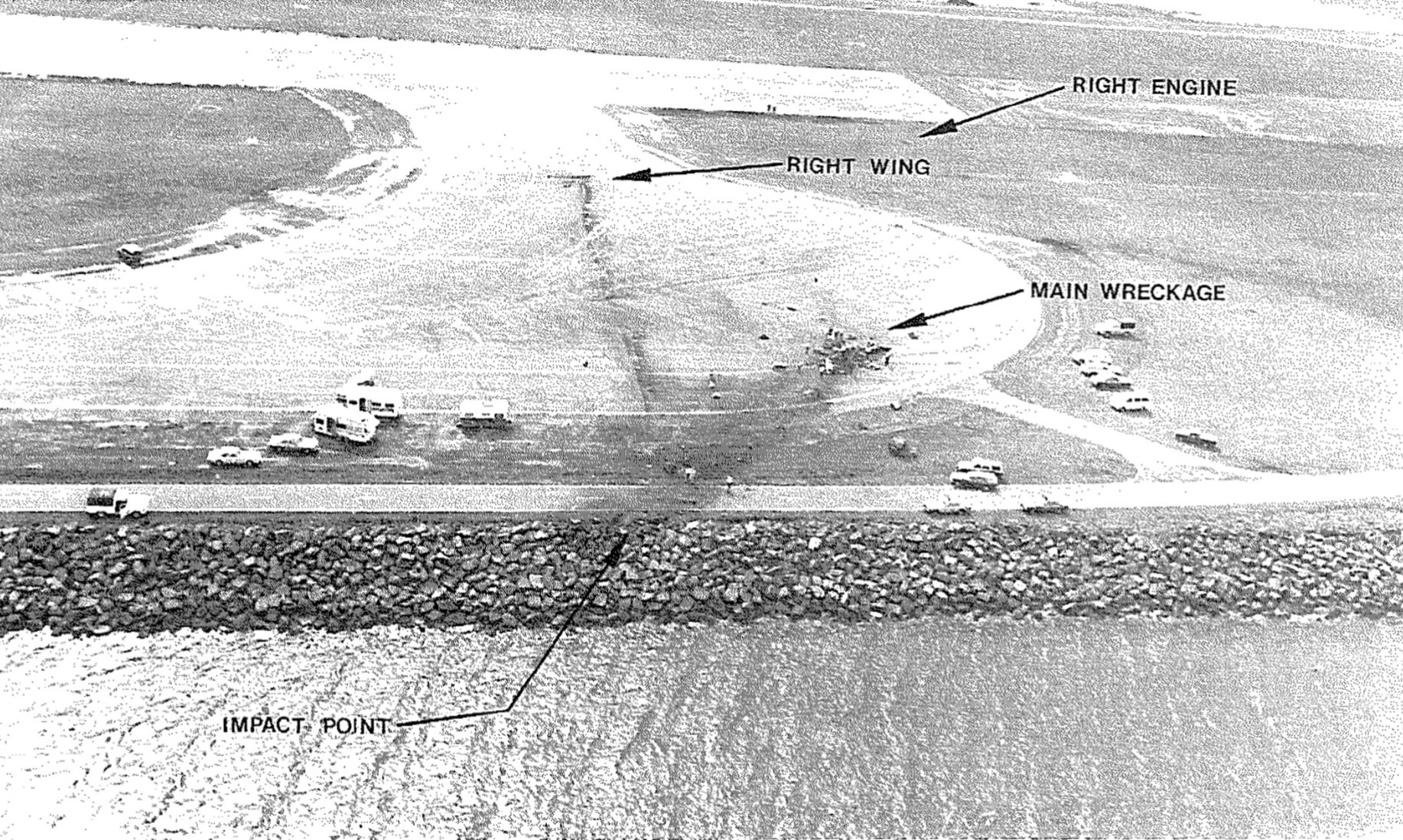
- Accident site

Accident
- Date: 21 February 1980
- Summary: Engine failure on take-off
- Site: Sydney Airport, Australia; 33°56′46″S 151°10′38″E

Aircraft
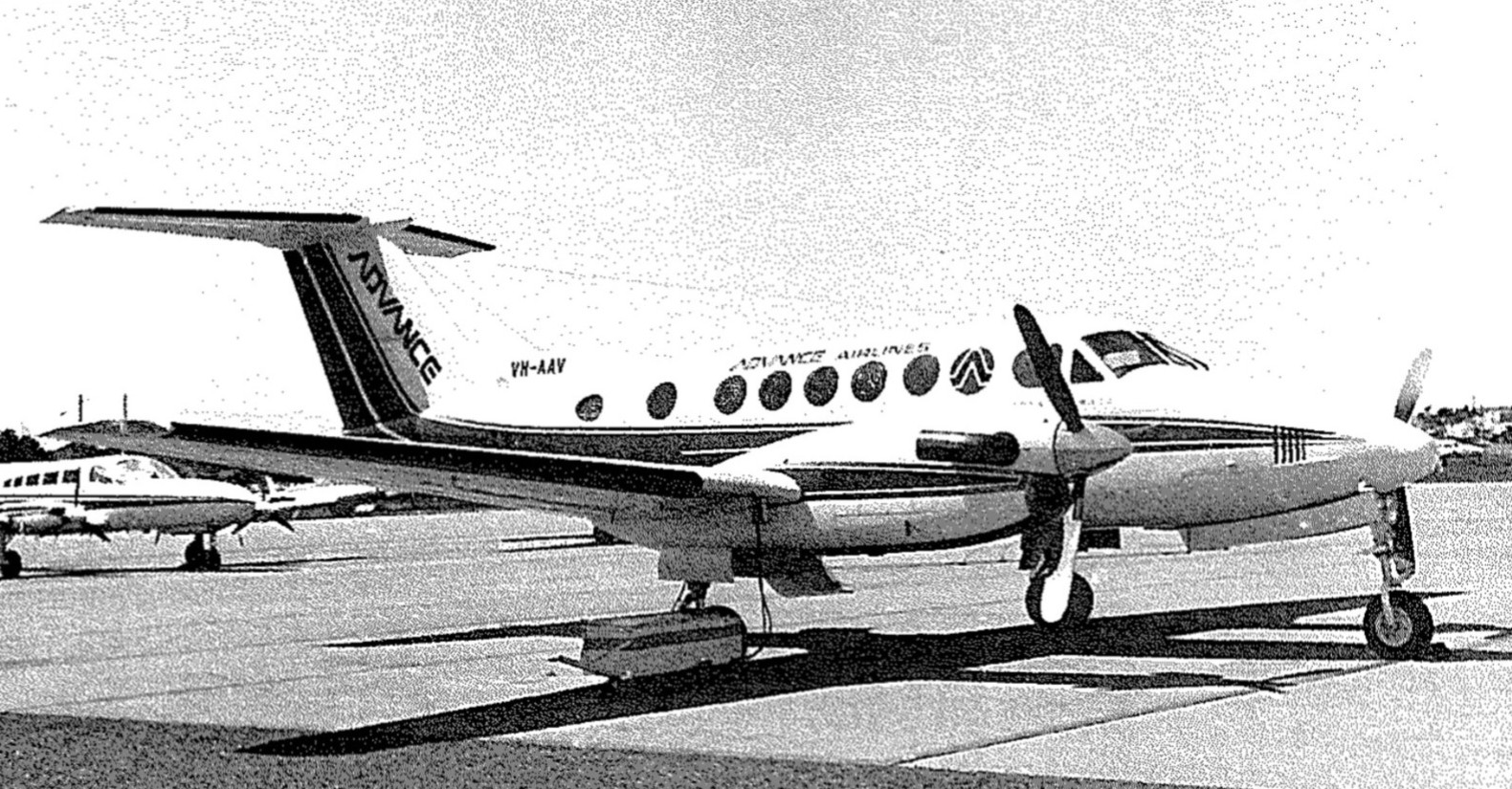
- VH-AAV, the King Air 200 involved in the accident
- Aircraft type: Beechcraft King Air 200
- Operator: Advance Airlines
- Call sign: ALPHA ALPHA VICTOR
- Registration: VH-AAV
- Flight origin: Sydney Airport, Australia
- Destination: Temora, New South Wales, Australia
- Occupants: 13
- Passengers: 12
- Crew: 1
- Fatalities: 13
- Survivors: 0

Advance Airlines Flight 4210 was a scheduled passenger flight that crashed at Sydney Airport on 21 February 1980, killing all 13 people on board the Advance Airlines Beechcraft King Air 200. After taking off on runway 25 for a scheduled flight, the aircraft's left (port) engine failed, and the pilot requested an emergency landing on runway 34. The plane crashed into the seawall while attempting the emergency landing. The accident caused the greatest number of fatalities in a civil aircraft crash in Australia since MacRobertson Miller Airlines Flight 1750, a Vickers Viscount that crashed near Port Hedland in Western Australia on 31 December 1968 killing all 26 on board.

== Accident ==
King Air VH-AAV was operating as Advance Airlines flight DR4210 to Temora and Condobolin, New South Wales, with a single pilot and 12 passengers on board. The aircraft commenced takeoff on runway 25 at 1908 hours, and, after climbing to a height of no more than 150 feet (46 m), the aircraft was observed to level off and enter a shallow bank to the left. The pilot contacted the control tower, advising he had suffered failure of the left engine and requesting an immediate return to land on runway 34. Air Traffic Control acknowledged this request and cleared the King Air to make a visual approach to the runway behind an Ansett Airlines Boeing 727 on final approach.

As VH-AAV continued to turn towards the runway, it descended to just a few feet above the water on a heading towards a seawall enclosing the runway that stretches into Botany Bay. This manoeuvre prompted the tower controller to enquire if the approach and landing would proceed as normal. The reply from the pilot eight seconds later was "Alpha Alpha Victor negative." This was the final transmission from the aircraft. At 1909:08, the Sydney Airport crash alarm system was activated, and the preceding Ansett 727 was instructed to expedite its landing roll and vacate the runway. At 1909:20, VH-AAV was cleared to land, but this clearance was not acknowledged. At 1909:22 the aircraft impacted the seawall six feet (1.8 m) above the waterline. The total duration of the flight was 106 seconds from brake release to impact. Five firefighting appliances were dispatched to the accident site, and crews extinguished the fire within 10 minutes of the crash.

The initial impact caused the left wing to disintegrate while a section of the right wing, including its engine, separated from the aircraft and came to rest adjacent to the runway. The fuselage was engulfed in an explosion caused by fuel igniting as the wing structures separated. The main wreckage bounced over the seawall and landed inverted on a taxiway, sliding along the ground for a distance of approximately 55 m (180 ft). All 13 aboard the aircraft were killed in the accident, which was ruled to be non-survivable.

== Investigation and aftermath ==
The accident had a profound impact upon the community in the small country town of Temora, as all 12 passengers killed were residents of the surrounding districts. The victims included a local police officer, his wife, and their one-week-old son, who had been airlifted to Sydney five days before the accident as he required urgent medical treatment for a respiratory condition. The family were returning home aboard flight 4210. It was revealed by the Sydney Morning Herald the day following the accident that the state MP for Temora, Jim Taylor, had regularly flown that service on that day of the week, but this particular week had instead flown to Parkes because his wife had been in the area.

The initial accident investigation was conducted by the Air Safety Investigation Branch of the Department of Transport, and its report was released in September 1981. While this investigation could not conclusively determine the cause of the accident, a number of conclusions were made about the events leading to the crash. These included the aircraft being heavier than the maximum allowable weight by some 128 kg (282 lb) at the time of departure due to a company procedure of using standard (estimated) passenger weights. An amendment had been made to the company's Operations Manual, advising pilots to use a reduced power setting for takeoff to reduce wear on the aircraft engines, but this amendment was not approved by the Department of Transport. When combined with the ambient temperature of 39 °C (102 °F) and an overweight aircraft, these factors adversely affected the single pilot's workload and reduced the single-engine performance of the King Air to a critical extent. The investigation determined that the left engine had likely failed due to water contamination of the aircraft's fuel tanks, but the source of the contamination was not established.

A board of inquiry, headed by Sir Sydney Frost, was convened on 1 December 1981, sitting over 90 days. On 27 January 1982, the board heard evidence from a former chief pilot of Advance Airlines who told the inquiry that on days when the temperature exceeded 28 °C (82 °F) (such as the day of the accident), it would be necessary to use a higher power setting than that advised in the company Operations Manual, and that in his interpretation of the manual this was quite clear. He also told the inquiry that Advance Airlines checked for water in the fuel system each time the aircraft was refuelled. When he operated the aircraft on scheduled flights the day prior to the accident, the aircraft performed "quite well." In 1983, the board of inquiry published its findings, attributing the accident to pilot error and the presence of water in the fuel tank, leading to the engine failure. The board of inquiry recommended that commercial aircraft operating in Australia with more than nine passengers should be operated by two pilots. This recommendation was implemented by the Australian aviation regulator.

== See also ==
- 2000 Australia Beechcraft King Air crash
- 2017 Essendon Airport Beechcraft King Air crash
