= Temora Aviation Museum =

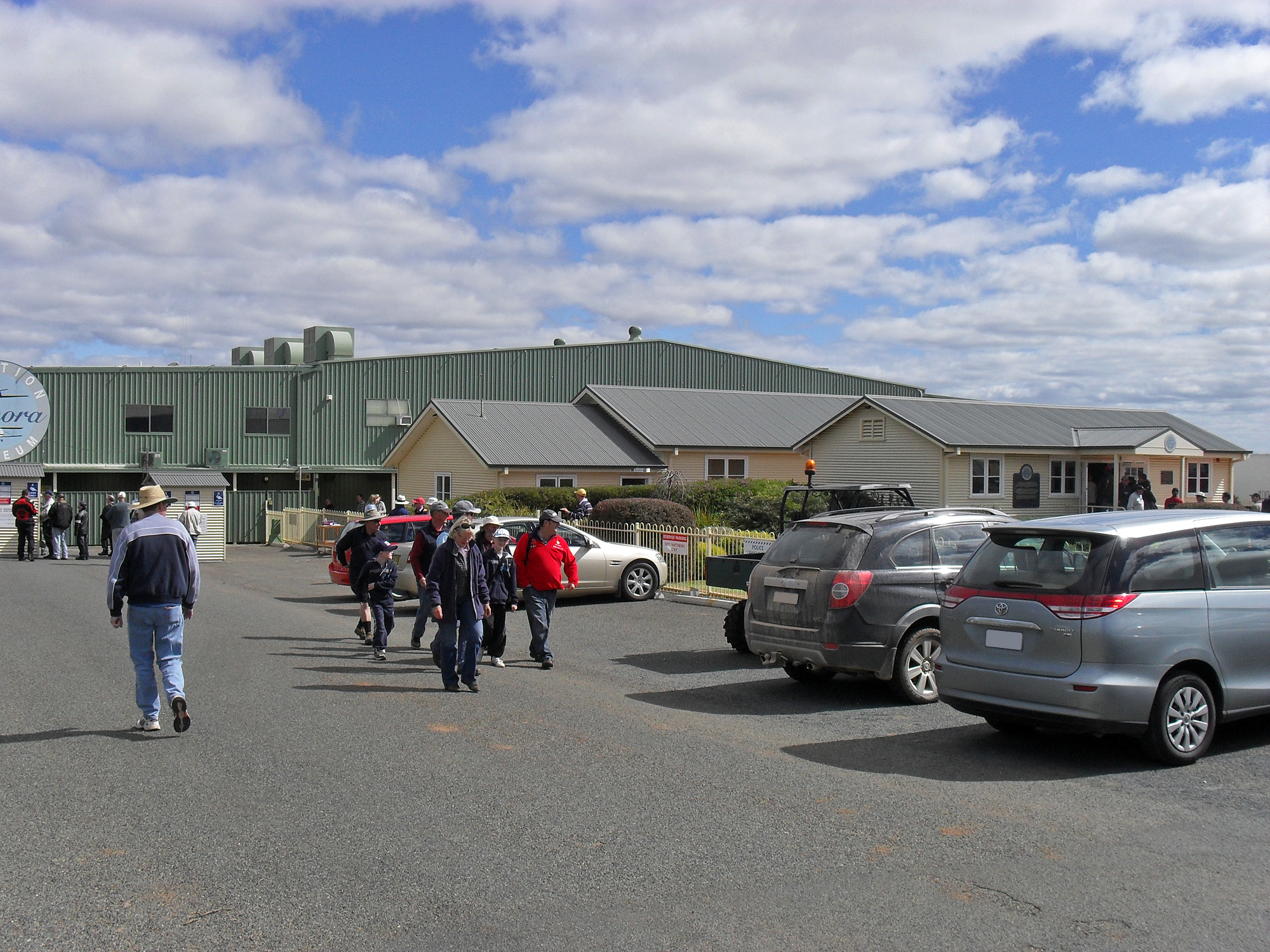
- Established: 1999
- Location: Temora, New South Wales, Australia
- Coordinates: 34.427272°S 147.515228°E
- Type: Aviation museum
- President: David Lowy
- Website: http://www.aviationmuseum.com.au

The Temora Aviation Museum is an Australian aviation museum located in Temora, New South Wales. The Museum was established in late 1999, based on the collection of warbird aircraft owned by David Lowy. Lowy remains the President and Founder of the Museum, which is overseen by a five-member Governing Committee.

The Museum is home to the Air Force Heritage Squadron's Temora Historic Flight with aircraft that range from before World War II to the Vietnam War era and holds Aircraft Showcase (on the 1st & 3rd Saturdays of most months) to display some of its operating aircraft.

The Museum often hosts visits from other historical aircraft and Royal Australian Air Force combat aircraft.

== History ==
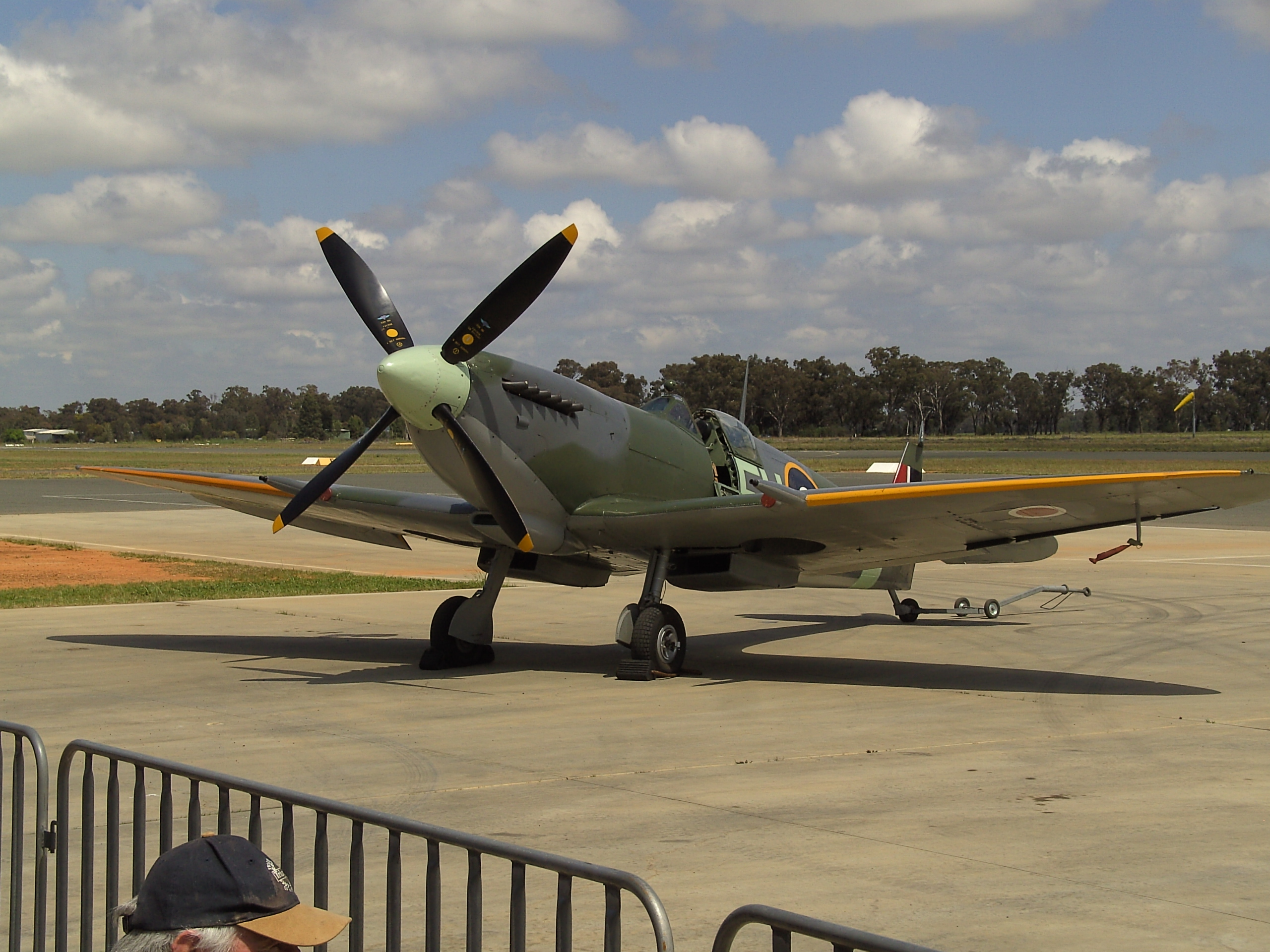
Spitfire Mk XVI, October 2011

The town of Temora is notable in Australian aviation history. The Royal Australian Air Force set up the No. 10 Elementary Flying Training School there in May 1941, the largest and longest-lived of the schools established under the Empire Air Training Scheme during World War II.

More than 10,000 personnel were involved in the school's operation, with more than 2,400 pilots being trained there, and at its peak had 97 de Havilland Tiger Moth aircraft for training purposes. The school was closed on 12 March 1946.

After World War II, Temora continued its aviation heritage, used for a number of activities including: parachuting, gliding, ultra-light aircraft operations, aerobatics, and model aircraft.

Sydney businessman David Lowy established the museum in Temora due to its aviation history, good weather, flat terrain, a co-operative local council and uncontrolled air space below 20,000 feet.

Temora Aviation Museum was incorporated in late 1999, at which point construction of the facilities commenced, and a governing committee was formed. The first hangar was completed in February 2000, and the first aircraft for the collection were donated by Lowy. The museum was officially opened to the public in June 2000 at which point construction commenced on the exhibition buildings, including: display space, theatrette, admission entrance, gift shop, a children's playground and picnic area.

In November 2002, the third stage of the museum complex, a 1,980 square metres (0.49 acres) hangar was completed and became the main display hangar for all the aircraft, while the original hangar became a restoration and maintenance facility.

== Temora Historic Flight ==
In May 2019, the museum announced that it had reached an agreement with the Department of Defence to transfer ownership of 11 historically significant aircraft to the Royal Australian Air Force, effective 1 July 2019. Under the agreement the aircraft would continue being housed at Temora and maintained by the same staff, but operated by the RAAF as the Temora Historic Flight. Twelve of the club's pilots were inducted into the RAAF Reserve as Special Capability Officers with the rank of flight lieutenant. In February 2021, the Flight was incorporated into No. 100 Squadron RAAF, reformed to operate the RAAF's warbirds.

== Aircraft ==
Aircraft	Civil registration	ADF serial	Image	Notes
Air Force Heritage Squadron (Temora Historic Flight)
English Electric Canberra TT18	VH-ZSQ			
Lockheed Hudson Mk III	VH-KOY	A16-211		
Cessna A-37 Dragonfly	VH-XVA			
Supermarine Spitfire Mk.VIII	VH-HET	A58-602		
Supermarine Spitfire Mk.XVI	VH-XVI			
Gloster Meteor F8	VH-MBX	A79-851		
de Havilland Vampire T.35	VH-VAM	A79-617		
CAC Sabre	VH-IPN	A94-983		
CAC Wirraway Mk 3	VH-BFF	A20-653		
CAC Boomerang	VH-MHR	A46-122		
de Havilland Tiger Moth	VH-UVZ	A17-691		
Ryan STM	VH-RSY			
Museum aircraft
Cessna A-37 Dragonfly	VH-DLO			
Cessna O-2 Skymaster	VH-OII			
Cessna O-1 Bird Dog	VH-LRE			On loan

== Warbirds Downunder ==
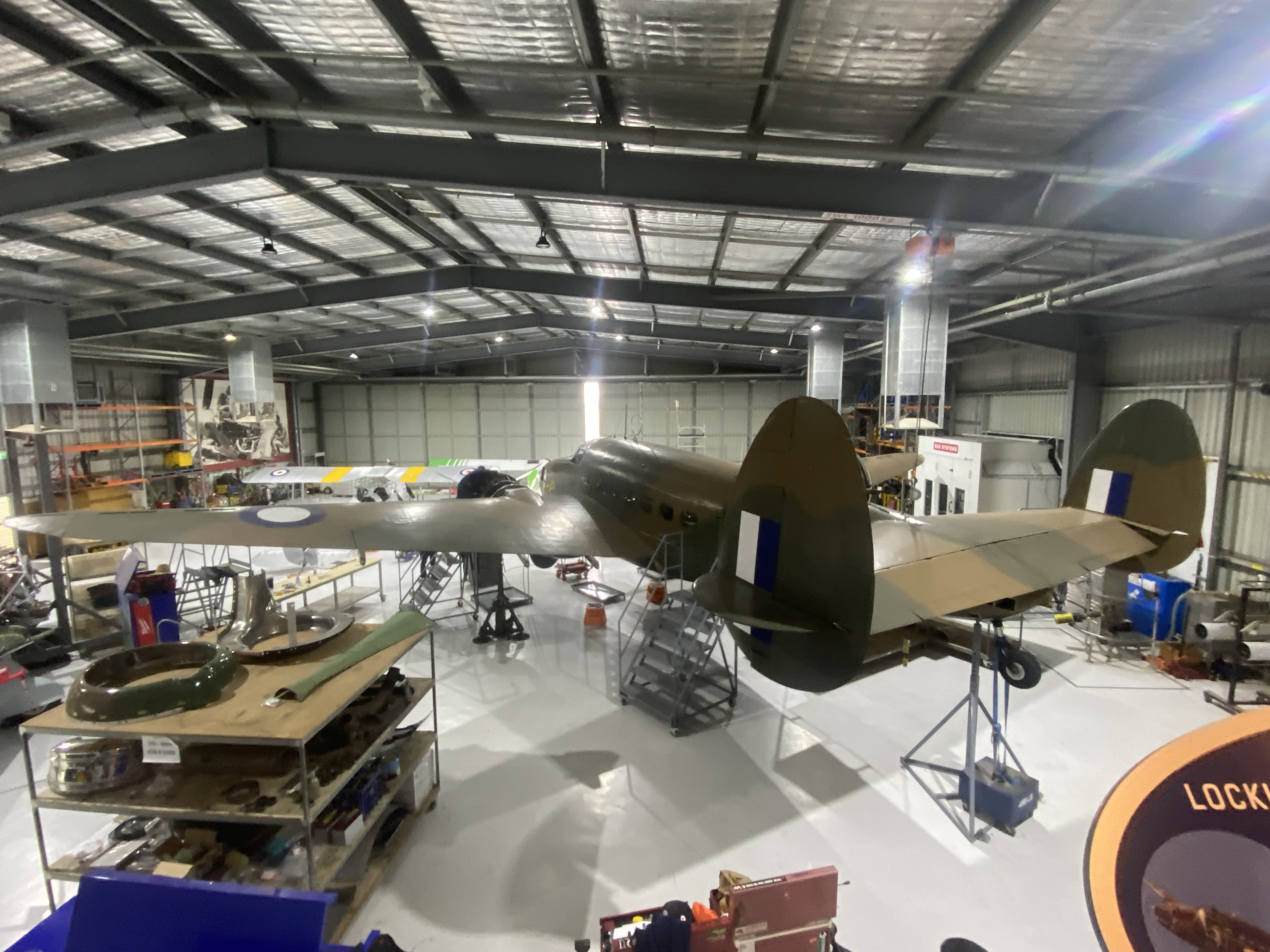
Hudson in maintenance, September 2024

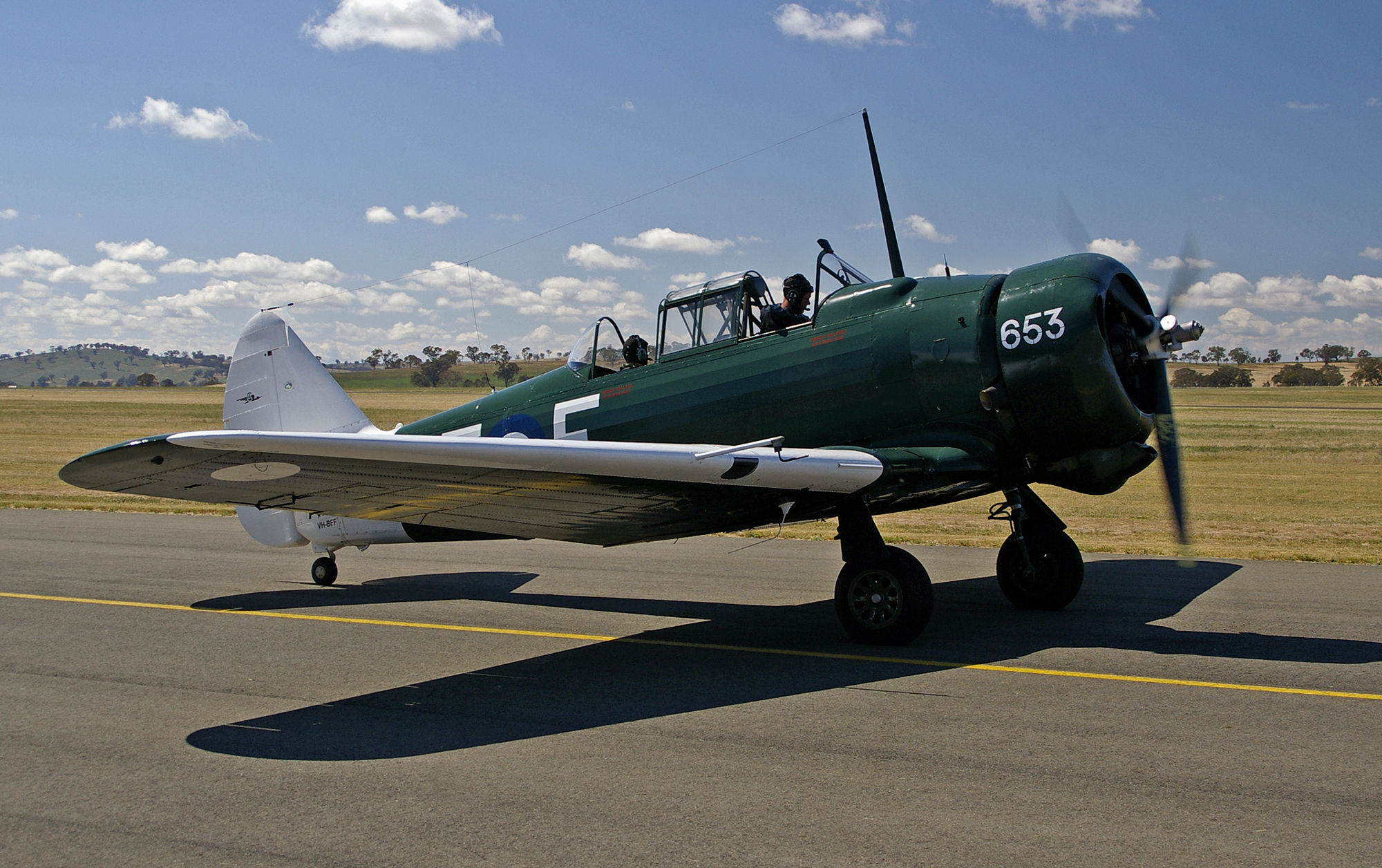
CAC Wirraway, October 2010

Temora Aviation Museum hosts the Warbirds Downunder airshow, a biennial event that "brings together the largest gathering of warbirds for a two-day celebration of Australian aviation history". The event features warbirds from private and museum collections around the country (such as the HARS collection), both in flying and static displays, as well as being regularly supported by current squadrons of the Royal Australian Air Force, including No. 100 Squadron and the RAAF formation aerobatic display team, the Roulettes.

Temora's population of 4,000 swells with each event. The inaugural show in 2011 saw almost 10,000 in attendance, with that number now estimated to have grown to around 22,000 visitors.

2020 Warbirds Downunder

Due to COVID-19, the 2020 event scheduled for the 17-18 October was postponed to 2021 with the schedule remaining unchanged into 2022; making 2021 & 2022 the first two consecutive years that the event has been run since its conception.

== See also ==
- List of aerospace museums
- Temora Airport
- RAAF Museum
