= Temora Post Office =

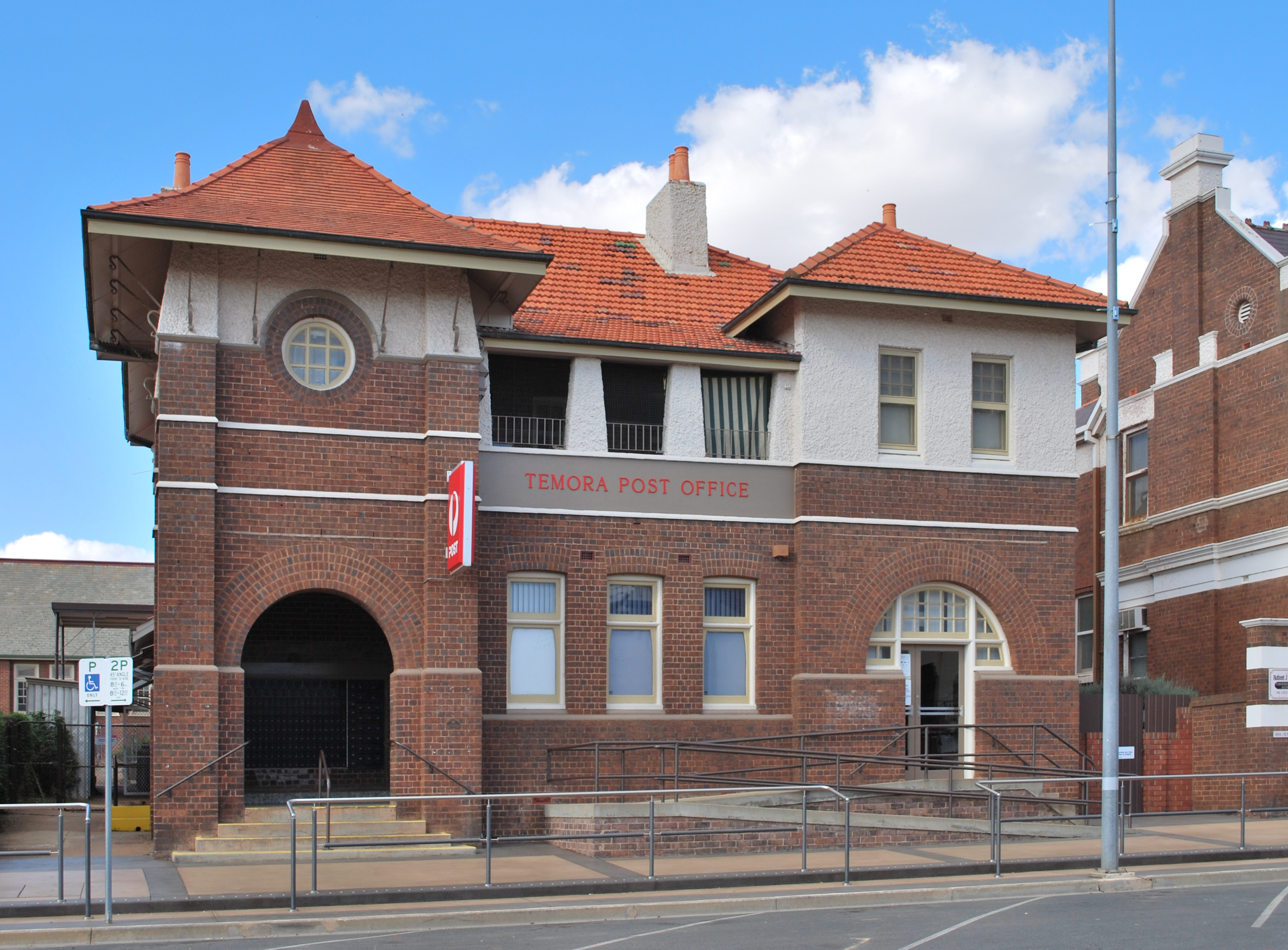
- Temora Post Office, 2010

- Location within New South Wales
- 34.4475°S 147.5345°E
- Location: 173 Hoskins Street, Temora, New South Wales, Australia

History
- Built: 1903–04

Commonwealth Heritage List
- Official name: Temora Post Office
- Type: Listed place (Historic)
- Designated: 8 November 2011
- Reference no.: 106129
- Builders: Rigby Brothers

Temora Post Office is a heritage-listed post office at 173 Hoskins Street, Temora, New South Wales, Australia. It was added to the Australian Commonwealth Heritage List on 8 November 2011.

== History ==
The township of Temora evolved from a local pastoral settlement in the 1860s, to a large town of about 20,000 people in the 1880s, following the discovery of gold in 1879. German settlers were also prominent in the area from the 1850s. The construction of the railway line to Temora in 1893 brought on a new phase of progress, cementing the town's importance as a wheat and wool growing centre.

A post office was constructed after the railway's arrival but it was destroyed by fire in 1901, a most destructive episode which destroyed a number of local buildings.

The present Temora Post Office was constructed in 1903–04 by Rigby Brothers for £2,448. The building was designed by the New South Wales Government Architect's Office under the leadership of Walter Liberty Vernon with George Oakeshott, being the architect in charge of Post Office designs. The postmaster moved into the first floor residence on 11 April 1904. The banisters and counters inside the post office were reputedly carved by Robert Cutting, Snr.

Recent alterations include the replacement of the telephone exchange to the rear of the building with a local museum, the removal of telephone boxes, scales and stamp vending machines, and the addition of a ramp to the front of the office. A staff amenities building has been built at the rear, along with an additional in-coming, bulk mail room, steel handling platform and truck canopy. There is a carport and garden shed located alongside an earlier weatherboard shed.

== Description ==
Temora Post Office is at 173 Hoskins Street, Temora, facing south west on a "wayside" frontage in Hoskins Street (Barmedman Road), 25m south of the Loftus Street corner (Young Road). The adjoining building to its immediate north is imposing: a distinctly American Romanesque-Queen Anne fusion. The building to the immediate south, a branch of the ANZ Bank, is similar in approach, with horseshoe arches, strapwork and mortarboard cornices. This side of Hoskins Street comprises an impressive Federation period streetscape. It was largely built up at one time, replacing several buildings destroyed in a large town fire in April 1901.

=== Exterior ===
The Post Office building is an asymmetrical design with two corner towers, each with a broad arched opening at its base and battered in from a plinth. The plinth is capped with a string course of painted cant bricks (also used at Quirindi). The building has been built in stretcher bond, with mottled, dark pink/brown bricks. Wall vents are cast, with a crown emblem, commonly used in government buildings. Elsewhere there are terracotta "egg-crate" form vents.

The right (southeast) tower has plain corners; the left (northwest) tower has piers at each corner. Both are crossed by string courses at the arch springing points and at the first floor line. A third string course runs through around waist level on the first floor, marking a change to roughcast stucco on the right tower and the brick base for a bullseye window on the left, originally intended to house a clock, the rear works of which would evidently have projected into one of the quarters rooms. The left tower is sheeted in roughcast stucco above the bullseye and its base, and the roof is pyramidal with flared hips. There is a series of ten, slender wrought iron diagonal struts supporting a "flying" timber plate. The struts are wrought in an Art Nouveau pattern. The roofing tiles are English pattern, and the gutters are quad profile, copper, and mounted on square dressed fascia boards without detail.

The eaves are boxed to conceal the rafters, and lined with a flat sheet, possibly an early example of asbestos-cement sheeting. The left tower has a "bulls-eye" round window comprising nine panes of glass. The left tower has a simple open stilted arch for the main entry. There are non-original concrete steps with a steel handrail giving access to the main entry porch and some of the facility's post boxes. The porch has a tiled floor and a painted timber ceiling. Entry doors are timber framed, and primarily glazed and located in the south wall of the porch. They broadly match the entry doors at the right-hand side of the façade. There is a surviving eight-pane transom window above. These doors are adjoined by the later disabled access ramp access which has been installed in front of the building, infilling the recessed middle bay of the building. The ramp structure apparently conceals the building's foundation stone.

The right tower has no roof struts and is marked by two simply indented square-headed windows. The ground floor arches are also related, both being crowned by six or seven rows of headers, but are at differing heights and treated differently inside each arch. The right tower arch is combined with a window whose glazing bars denote a door fanlight, upper sidelight windows and line up vertically with a cut in the brick wall to either side of its double door.

The recessed middle bay houses the former postal hall at ground floor level and the open verandah of the quarters above. The postal hall has three brick segmental- headed double-hung sash windows, embedded in a broad, shallow and slanted sill. The stiles of the upper sash are tapered. The first floor verandah is divided by two tapering piers that directly support a light fascia and balcony roof, treated as integral with the main roof behind and above it. The stuccoed piers reflect the Federation bungalow fashion emerging at this time. The openings are screened with mesh to exclude birds. The side elevations are equally varied, with a chamfered bay on the southeast elevation and a straight fronted gable on the northwest elevation. The three main chimneys are irregularly placed in the upper roof hips, and are given a strongly arts and crafts flavour, the stacks being tapered and clad in roughcast stucco, then topped with long, tapering terra cotta pots. There is a fascia and boxed eaves to conceal rafters at the roof edges, and the eave soffits are boarded and raked at the same angle as the roof above.

To the west elevation a projecting bay with tall sash windows to the angled faces are of face brick with contrasting, terracotta coloured brick quoins. Immediately behind there is a side access door to the stairhall and thus to the former quarters. It has a slate threshold and step. The stair window is leadlight in an art-Nouveau design. There are copper gutters, spouts and downpipes which feed into cast iron downpipes about 2 metres from ground level. Brick sills have been rendered and painted. They finish flush, and do not extend over the wall to form a drip mould.

At the rear of the building there is a door to the laundry with a distinctive, pressed metal hood. The door is ledged and sheeted. There is a timber weatherboard garden shed in the garden, and a steel /timber carport. More recently a kit-type zincalume garden shed has been added. The garden is surrounded by timber and corrugated iron fences on a brick base. There are several surviving bullnose brick retaining walls.

The rear of the post office yard is paved with concrete and asphalt. There is a steel canopy to protect delivery trucks, and a small zincalume shed which once sheltered bicycles. Under the canopy is a steel loading ramp, leading to a roller shutter to the delivery room. The delivery room is an addition to the sorting room.

To the east elevation, alterations have occurred to allow the introduction of additional post boxes. There is a raised concrete platform to give access, fitted with a steel handrail, and aluminium awnings for protection. One set of boxes have been inserted into a former window aperture, and the brickwork above has been patched.

The sorting room is a single storey structure, under a gabled roof with a brick parapet. It has Marseilles-pattern roof tiles exposed rafters, quad gutter and rectangular downpipes. The eaves are timber lined, and there is painted netting between the rafters. The windows are double hung, with a transom, and fitted with "amplimesh" aluminium screens.

=== Interior ===
The general office (main chamber) has been upgraded to provide modern retail and a range of postal services. It has carpet over a timber floor, and modern joinery and retail displays. Many original elements survive, such as windows, strapped ceilings, consoles, an arch and chamfered plaster nibs. The ceiling is a modern, suspended type, and conceals air conditioning ducts and services.

The main chamber is divided from the service areas by modern plasterboard partition walls. The postal box filling room has vinyl flooring over timber, plaster walls, original double hung windows, a strapped plaster ceiling and a distinctive concrete column to support the upper floor.

The sorting room is housed in a single storey wing. There are original timber framed multi paned sash windows with transoms to the west wall. Some of the glazing bars have been removed to the transoms have been altered. The room has a distinctive cornice.

The Post Master's Office is located in the projecting bay to the east side of the building. It has two double hung sash windows and a corner fireplace which has been sealed. One of its two doors has been replaced with a flush panel door and splayed architraves. The other door, leading to the stairwell is a four-panel door, and has an ogee pattern architrave which is original. A suspended ceiling has been installed.

The rear office is formed with plasterboard partitions and remnants of earlier decorative plaster detailing are visible.

The stationery storeroom room retains its small double-hung window and its timber ceiling with v-jointed boards and Edwardian painted timber cornice. It has four brick walls, with a sealed arch and 2 unused doorways. One leads up to the adjacent kitchen.

The kitchen contains a sealed fireplace and a 1950s vintage sink bench. There are built-in cupboards next to the chimney breast. The door has been replaced with a flush leaf. The plaster walls include a 'dado. The original double hung window is extant within the space.

The laundry has a concrete floor covered in vinyl. Walls are of painted brick and the entry door is braced and ledged. The ceiling is painted, v-jointed boards and has a manhole. The double hung window has an elongated bottom sash.

The kitchen adjoins an enclosed verandah with a raked timber ceiling and concrete floor. The original posts are visible between the glass louvres and painted "infill" studwork. This appears to be of 1950s construction. There is one unused exit door, and another door leading to the toilets outside. The toilets are housed in a separate building with a timber frame and asbestos cement linings. It has a coved concrete floor and raked ceiling under a gable roof and fixed louvre windows, cast-iron basins, braced and ledged doors and simple timber details.

Much of the interior is painted in a grey colour scheme, but there is evidence of an earlier cream scheme.

=== Condition ===
The building is in sound condition, although there are instances of the effects of salt damp. There are some roof tiles which have slipped. Some exterior painted surfaces need attention. Some of the interior displays routine wear and tear. The level of intactness is comparatively good given age and changes in use. There are effects of rising damp in some areas.

== Heritage listing ==
Temora Post Office was listed on the Australian Commonwealth Heritage List on 8 November 2011 having satisfied the following criteria.

Criterion A: Processes

Temora Post Office, built in 1904, originally incorporated a post office, residence and rear telephone exchange, now replaced by a museum. Historically, in its original state, the post office has provided an important civic function for this regional centre from the early years of the twentieth century. This, in combination with the fact that the post office was rebuilt after a disastrous local fire, and immediately following Federation, along with a number of other important civic and commercial buildings in this part of town, to form a conspicuous and highly valued Federation-era streetscape, elevates the building to CHL threshold for this value.

The significant components of Temora Post Office include the main 1904 post office building.

Criterion D: Characteristic values

Temora Post Office is an example of:

- a post office and telegraph office with quarters (second generation typology 1870–1929) Federation-era Public Free Style. Designed by the office of the New South Wales State Government Architect, under the aegis of W L Vernon. George Oakeshott was the architect in charge of Post Office designs. Typologically, in its original state, Temora Post Office was highly characteristic of its period, with a combination of post office, telegraph and residential functions. While the replacement of the rear telephone exchange, and modifications to the residential and post office areas have diminished the typological attributes, an overall understanding of the original workings of the post office remain.
- an unusual combination of Arts and Crafts with some Japanese influences expressed in a Federation-era public building. Its exterior demonstrates the Federation period sense of line and plane, with a distinctive pitch change in the left hand tower roof. The building also successfully integrates the Federation themes of round-arches, face-brick and roughcast rendering, bracketing, expressive tiled roof forms, and irregular planning that responds to internal particulars. Externally it is also one of the better preserved two-storey post offices from the early Federation period.

Criterion E: Aesthetic characteristics

Temora Post office is a lively and accomplished Federation design, expressing an unusual combination of Arts and Crafts and Japanese influences. It makes an important contribution to an impressive and coherent Federation streetscape, largely dating from the period following a disastrous local fire in April 1901.

Criterion G: Social value

The building could be considered to be of local social significance to the Temora community, as an important component of Temora's commercial centre for over a century.
