= Temora (poem) =

Poem

Temora: An ancient epic poem is a work by Scottish poet and writer James Macpherson, published in March 1763 (see 1763 in poetry).

As with Fingal in 1762, the author posed as the translator of what he asserted was an ancient Gaelic epic by the supposed Ossian, son of Fingal (see also Works of Ossian in the article: 1765 in poetry).

It, together with other poems he had published at the same time, produced a mixed but mostly favourable response from critics.

The Temora genus of crustaceans, found on coastal waters across the globe but first described from specimens collected from the shores of Ireland, was named for the eponymous ancient palace introduced in the poem.
