= Temora, New South Wales =

Temora
- Town
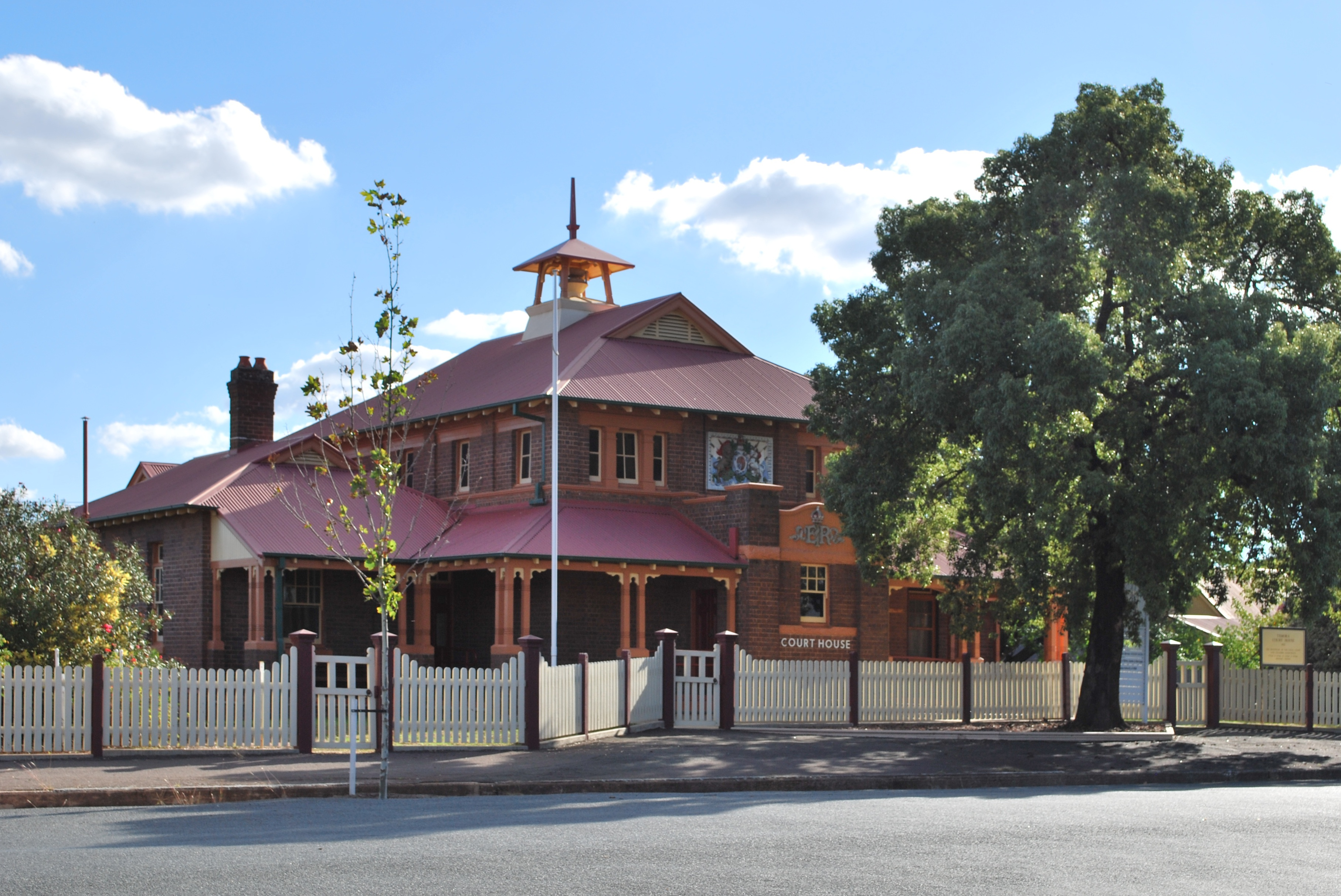
- Temora Court House, constructed in 1902

- Coordinates: 34°26′0″S 147°32′0″E
- Country: Australia
- State: New South Wales
- LGA: Temora Shire
- Location: 425 km (264 mi) from Sydney; 85 km (53 mi) from Wagga Wagga; 56 km (35 mi) from Junee

Government
  - State electorate: Cootamundra
  - Federal division: Riverina
- Elevation: 302 m (991 ft)

Population
  - Total: 4,016 (2021 census)
- Postcode: 2666
- County: Bland
- Parish: Bundawarrah
- Mean max temp: 22.3 °C (72.1 °F)
- Mean min temp: 8.8 °C (47.8 °F)
- Annual rainfall: 525.7 mm (20.70 in)

Temora (/təˈmɔːrə/) is a town in the north-east of the Riverina area of New South Wales, 418 kilometres (260 mi) south-west of the state capital, Sydney. At the 2021 census the population of Temora was 4,016.

Temora was named by John Donald McCansh. In September 1880 he told the Warwick Argus:

I took up the country for a sheep run in 1847, my sole companion being Valentine Lawler, who was then lessee of a station ('Nimbi') on Cunningham Creek. We could not ascertain the native name of the place as there were no blacks about, and rather than give it an English name, I called it 'Temora', the native name of a property near which I lived some years previously in another part of the Colony. I gave the station the name specially because it was aboriginal and I liked it. I did not know at that time, nor for years afterwards, that Temora was a name in Ossian's poems.

Neither the Wiradjuri Dictionary (2010) nor the Macquarie Dictionary of Aboriginal Words (2006) lists "temora" or any words similar to it, but the Dharug language dictionary online defines "temora" as "a tree standing alone". Alternatively, in the Celtic language it is derived from a term which means "an eminence commanding a wide view.

== Geography ==
Temora is located in the north-eastern Riverina region of NSW and is also part of the South West Slopes. Temora has an elevation of 302 metres (991 ft) above sea level. The countryside is flat to undulating. To the north of Temora lies the Narraburra Hills and the Boginderra Hills Nature Reserve.

Temora is located approximately 90 kilometres (56 mi) north of Wagga Wagga. It is situated on the Burley Griffin Way linking Canberra and Griffith and the Goldfields Way which link Albury and Wagga Wagga to the Newell Highway.

=== Climate ===
Temora has a temperate climate, with cool, damp winters and hot, dry summers. Under the Köppen climate classification, Temora has a humid subtropical climate (Cfa) with a cold semi-arid (BSk) influence.

Winters are cool to cold by Australian standards (though typical of western New South Wales), with the mean maximum temperature falling to 13.0 °C (55.4 °F) in July, and the mean minimum 2.1 °C (35.8 °F); with modest overcast periods through the winter. The lowest temperature recorded at Temora was −6.8 °C (19.8 °F) on 29 August 2018, and the lowest maximum temperature 4.4 °C (39.9 °F) on 3 July 1984. The last significant snowfall was on 17 August 1970 where as much as 3 inches (8 cm) of snow accumulated in town; this closely followed a more moderate snowfall on 15 September 1969.

By contrast, summers in Temora are hot and dry with a low relative humidity. Mean maximum temperatures range between 29.7 and 31.5 °C (85.5 and 88.7 °F); minima ranging between 13.8 and 16.2 °C (56.8 and 61.2 °F). The highest temperature on record is 46.4 °C (115.5 °F) on 4 January 2020. Daily extreme temperatures commenced record in 1965, while those of mean temperature in 1934.

Climate data for Temora Research Station (1934–2005, extremes 1965–2025); 270 m AMSL; 34.41° S, 147.52° E
Month	Jan	Feb	Mar	Apr	May	Jun	Jul	Aug	Sep	Oct	Nov	Dec	Year
Record high °C (°F)	46.4 (115.5)	45.0 (113.0)	40.1 (104.2)	35.8 (96.4)	27.9 (82.2)	24.0 (75.2)	23.9 (75.0)	27.1 (80.8)	33.9 (93.0)	37.1 (98.8)	43.0 (109.4)	43.8 (110.8)	46.4 (115.5)
Mean daily maximum °C (°F)	31.5 (88.7)	30.8 (87.4)	27.8 (82.0)	22.5 (72.5)	17.8 (64.0)	13.9 (57.0)	13.0 (55.4)	14.8 (58.6)	18.2 (64.8)	22.0 (71.6)	26.0 (78.8)	29.7 (85.5)	22.3 (72.2)
Mean daily minimum °C (°F)	16.0 (60.8)	16.2 (61.2)	13.3 (55.9)	9.0 (48.2)	5.6 (42.1)	3.2 (37.8)	2.1 (35.8)	3.0 (37.4)	4.7 (40.5)	7.7 (45.9)	10.6 (51.1)	13.8 (56.8)	8.8 (47.8)
Record low °C (°F)	4.7 (40.5)	4.2 (39.6)	1.9 (35.4)	−3.1 (26.4)	−4.6 (23.7)	−5.3 (22.5)	−6.4 (20.5)	−6.8 (19.8)	−4.7 (23.5)	−3.0 (26.6)	−1.0 (30.2)	3.4 (38.1)	−6.8 (19.8)
Average precipitation mm (inches)	46.0 (1.81)	40.2 (1.58)	40.4 (1.59)	41.1 (1.62)	41.8 (1.65)	43.1 (1.70)	46.3 (1.82)	45.0 (1.77)	42.1 (1.66)	52.2 (2.06)	46.2 (1.82)	41.3 (1.63)	525.7 (20.71)
Average precipitation days (≥ 0.2 mm)	5.6	5.0	5.1	6.0	8.6	10.6	12.7	11.6	9.3	8.9	6.9	6.0	96.3
Source 1: Temora Research Station (general data, 1934–2005)
Source 2: Temora Airport (extreme temperatures, 2005–2025)

== History ==
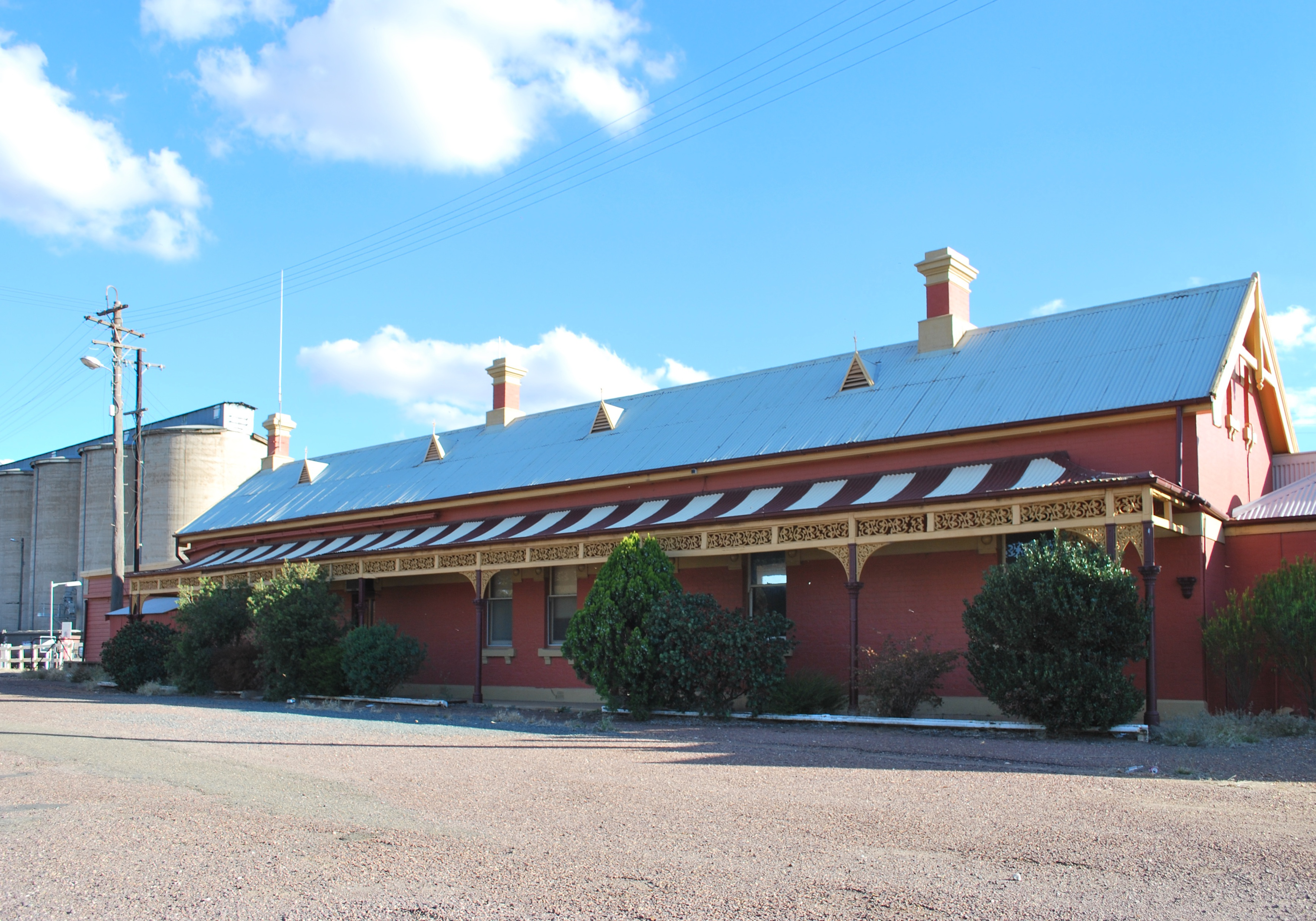
Temora railway station

Temora started as a pastoral station in 1847. Gold was discovered later in the area, and a small village established. Temora Post Office opened on 1 February 1874 and was renamed West Temora in 1880 on the same day an existing East Temora office was renamed Temora.

Gold was first found in the area in 1869 but the main rush commenced in 1879, with over 20,000 people thronging to the gold diggings at Temora the district was proclaimed a gold field on 4 June 1880. Despite drought conditions, it is said that, by 1881, the Temora field was producing half the state's gold. In 1881 the highest yield from the Temora field was attained – an Impressive 35,228oz.

Some large discoveries were made, including the famous Mother Shipton nugget, which weighed in at 308.35 ounces, a facsimile of which appears in the Rock and Mineral Museum section of Temora Rural Museum.

With the collapse of the gold field Temora witnessed a rapid drop in population. By the time of the first Australian census in 1911 the population was 2,784.

The Temora railway station opened in 1893.

In the early twentieth century, Temora was among a number of places in New South Wales settled by people of German origin. Temora and surrounding districts such a Trungley Hall have many Germanic road names.

In more recent times, gold mining occurred at the Paragon Gold Mine at Gidginbung, 12 km north of the town, from 1986 to 1996.

Historical population
Year	Pop.	±%
1921	3,048	—
1933	3,823	+25.4%
1947	5,423	+41.9%
1954	4,567	−15.8%
1961	4,469	−2.1%
1966	4,536	+1.5%
1971	4,466	−1.5%
1976	4,324	−3.2%
1981	4,350	+0.6%
1986	4,295	−1.3%
1991	4,279	−0.4%
1996	4,125	−3.6%
2001	4,146	+0.5%
2006	4,086	−1.4%
2011	3,874	−5.2%
2016	4,054	+4.6%
2021	4,016	−0.9%
Source: Australian Bureau of Statistics data.

== Heritage listings ==
Temora has a number of heritage-listed sites, including:

- Cootamundra-Griffith railway: Temora railway station
- 173 Hoskins Street: Temora Post Office

== Industry ==
=== Agriculture ===
Temora is in the heart of the grain growing area of southern NSW and is one of the largest wheat, canola, other cereals and wool producers in the state. It has the second largest honey producer in Australia.

Much of the industry within Temora is to support these agricultural activities, including grain and wool storage and brokerage, agricultural equipment suppliers and servicing, chemical and fertiliser suppliers and transport.

=== Tourism ===
The town is also the location for the Temora Aviation Museum, which has a large range of aircraft, including Australia's only two flying Spitfires.

Aviation is well represented with the Temora Aero Club located at Temora Airport. The Aero Club caters for GA, RAA and Gliding flying and instruction.

The Bundawarrah Centre incorporates a rural museum and the Temora Ambulance Museum. Located in the rural museum is a cottage of hardwood slabs that was Sir Donald Bradman's first home, a one-room public school, bush church, country dance hall, printing works, flour mill, ambulance station and fire station.

Lake Centenary, just north of the town, is a man-made centre for aquatic enthusiasts, covering power boating, waterskiing, sailing, canoeing, using the paddle boats, or simply swimming. The 55-hectare lake has a boat ramp as well as landscaped picnic facilities.

=== Education ===
Temora has two public primary schools, one public high school and one Catholic school as well as a TAFE campus.

Temora High School is a comprehensive high school established in 1952. Temora High School has an outstanding record of achievement both academic and sporting, consistently achieving some of the best HSC results in the Riverina.

Temora Public School is highly regarded in the Temora community for the provision of successful academic, sporting, cultural and extra-curricular programs. The school is located in the centre of town adjacent to Callaghan Park, the basketball stadium and swimming pool.

Temora West Primary School was officially opened on 25 September 1959 by the Governor of N.S.W, Sir Eric Woodward. It not only served the parents of the immediate area, but through zoning, it drew on the area previously served by the schools at Bagdad, Bectric, Dunwell – Mimosa, Pucawan, Yarrandale – Wilna and Rannock. Later part of the Dirnaseer area was included.

St Anne's Central School, Temora, covers from Kindergarten through to Year 10.

TAFE NSW Riverina Institute has a campus in Temora. This campus relocated to its new location in 2010.

=== Health ===
Temora Health Service includes a 34-bed hospital delivering maternity, surgical, and aged care services to the Temora, Bland, Coolamon and Lachlan Shires. More than 1,700 patients are treated annually. Community health services, including physiotherapy, mental health and transitional care are delivered by local staff with extra services provided by visiting staff.

Temora has two medical practices, two dental clinics, a podiatrist, two physiotherapy centres, two pharmacies, and a medical imaging centre (Alpenglow). A new hospital is planned.

== Transport ==
=== Road ===
Temora is on the crossroads of the Goldfields Way [B85] and Burley Griffin Way [B94]. Goldfields Way runs north–south from Wagga Wagga to West Wyalong and is the main route between Albury and Brisbane. Burley Griffin Way links Griffith to the Hume Highway north west of Yass.

=== Rail ===
Temora railway station is on the Lake Cargelligo railway line. It opened in 1893. The station had a traditional role as a transfer point for passenger services to Hillston, Lake Cargelligo, Rankin Springs, Burcher and Naradhan, most of which were withdrawn in the late 1970s. The station is not presently served by passenger services however remains an important signalling facility, is used as a stop by the Lachlan Valley Railway and is currently being restored by Temora Shire Council for use a tourist and youth facility.

The Lake Cargelligo railway line branches from the Main South line at Cootamundra and travels in a north-westerly direction to the small town of Lake Cargelligo. The line is used primarily for grain haulage, although passenger service was provided until 1983.

The Temora–Roto railway line is a partly closed railway line which branches from the Lake Cargelligo line at the town of Temora and travels west through the northern part of the Riverina to the towns of Griffith and Hillston. A connection to the Broken Hill line created a cross-country route, although this was never utilised to its full potential, and the line beyond Hillston was built to low grade 'pioneer' standards.

=== Air ===
Temora Airport can handle aircraft from light single-engine planes to narrow-body airliners such as the Boeing 737. Currently no regularly scheduled passenger flights serve the airport. As well as the aviation museum the airport also includes a housing estate where people have built houses with an aircraft hangar in their back yard.

=== Public transport and cycling ===
NSW TrainLink trains operate from Sydney and Melbourne to Cootamundra train station where they are met by a connecting bus service to transport passengers to Temora. The train to Melbourne includes a stop at Wagga which provides further links to Adelaide.

Temora has an off-road bicycle track from the township to Lake Centenary. Temora also has a modest number of on-road bicycle tracks.

== Sport ==
Sport has long been a significant part of life in Temora as can be seen by the success Temora has had in various sporting arenas. The biggest and most popular sport in the town is rugby league, in which the town formerly competed for the prestigious Maher Cup.

Sporting clubs include:

- Temora Basketball Association
- Temora Bowling and Recreation Club
- Temora District Cricket Association
- Temora Dragons Rugby League Club (Group 9 Rugby League)
- Temora Golf Club
- Temora Greyhound Racing Club
- Temora Harness Racing Club
- Temora Little Athletics
- Temora Kangaroos – AFL & Netball
- Temora Rugby Union Club Inc
- Temora Swimming Club
- Temora Town Tennis Courts
- Temora United Soccer Club
- Temora V8 Jetboats
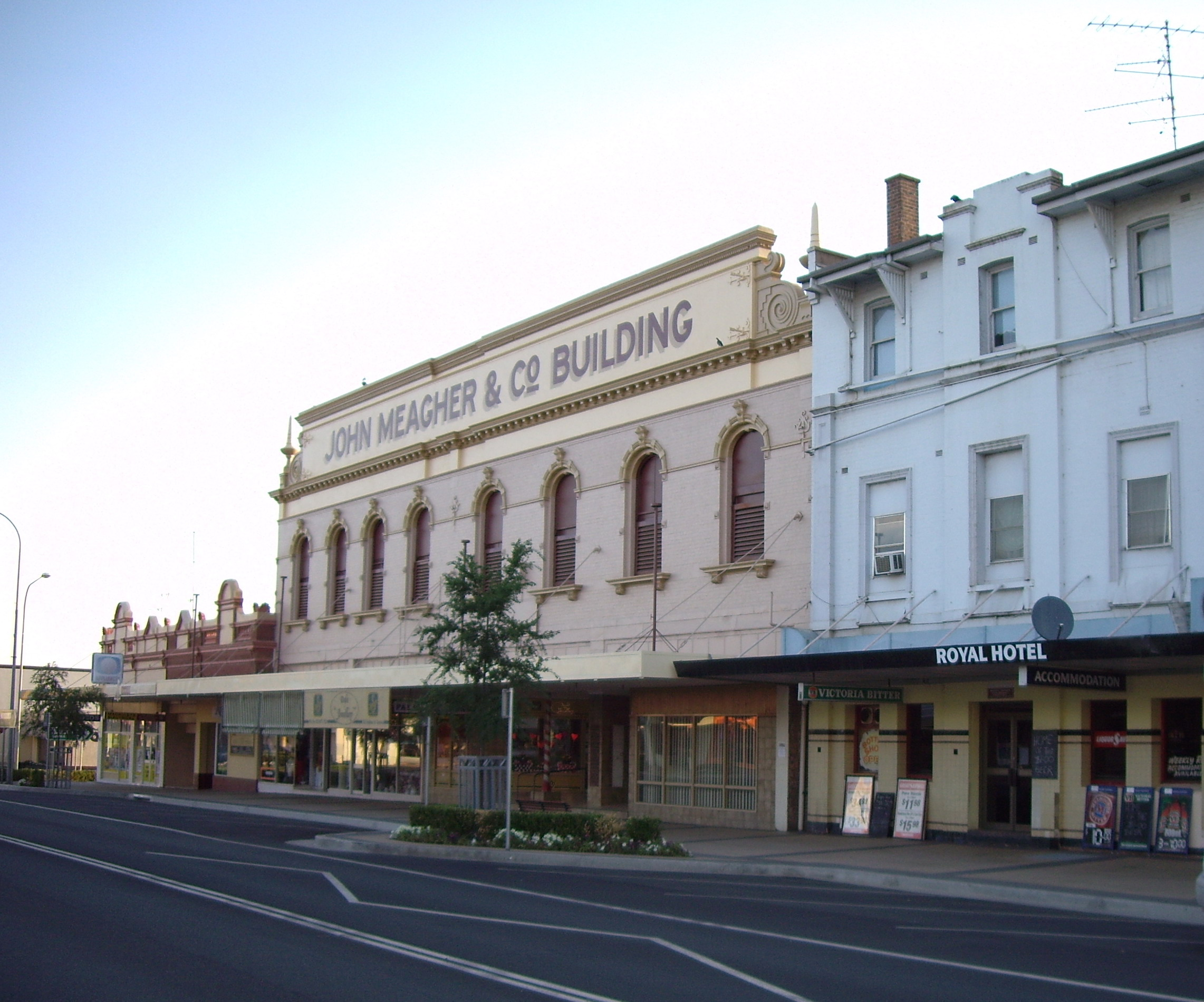
A sample of the architecture in Temora

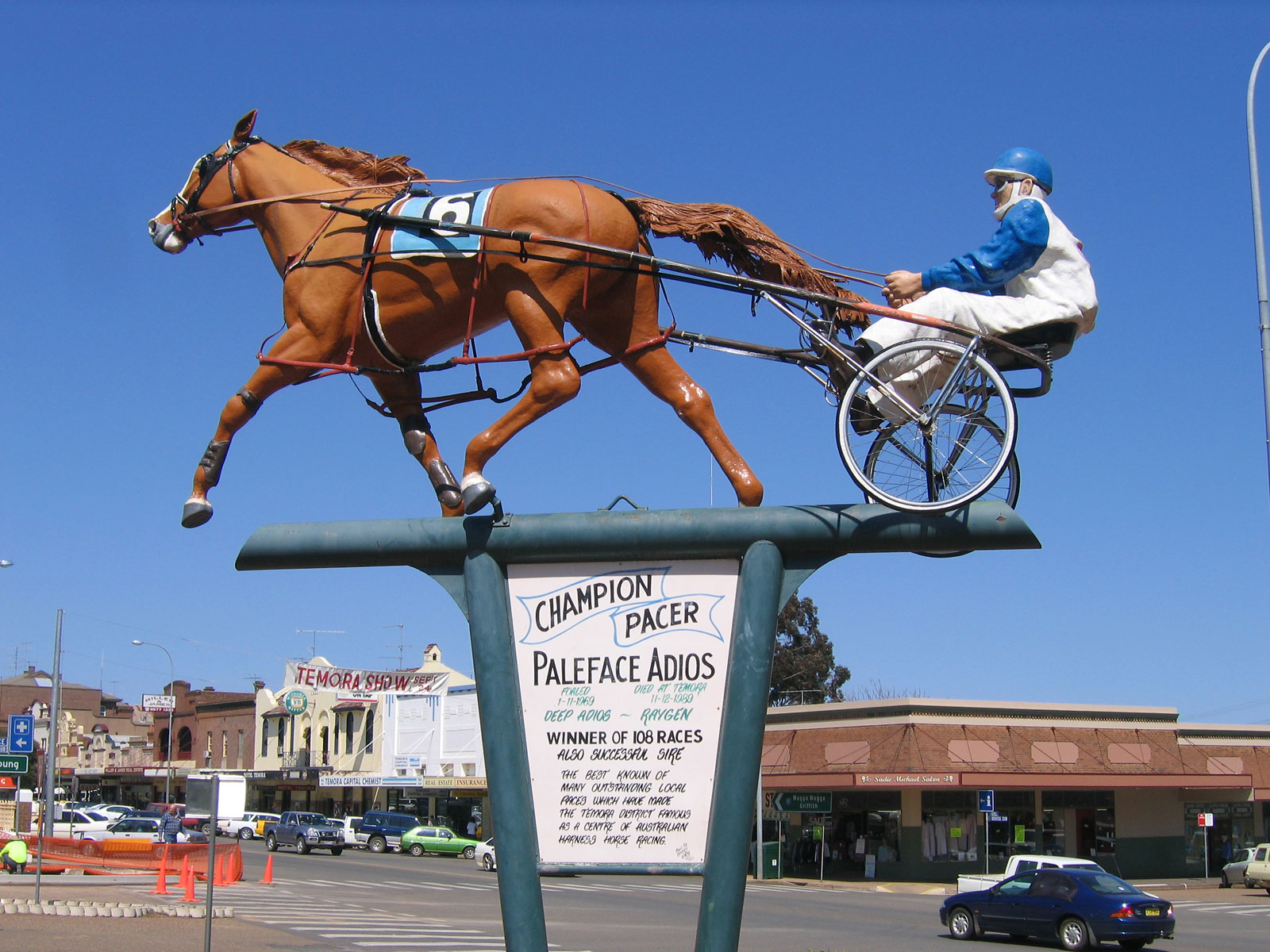
Paleface Adios Memorial

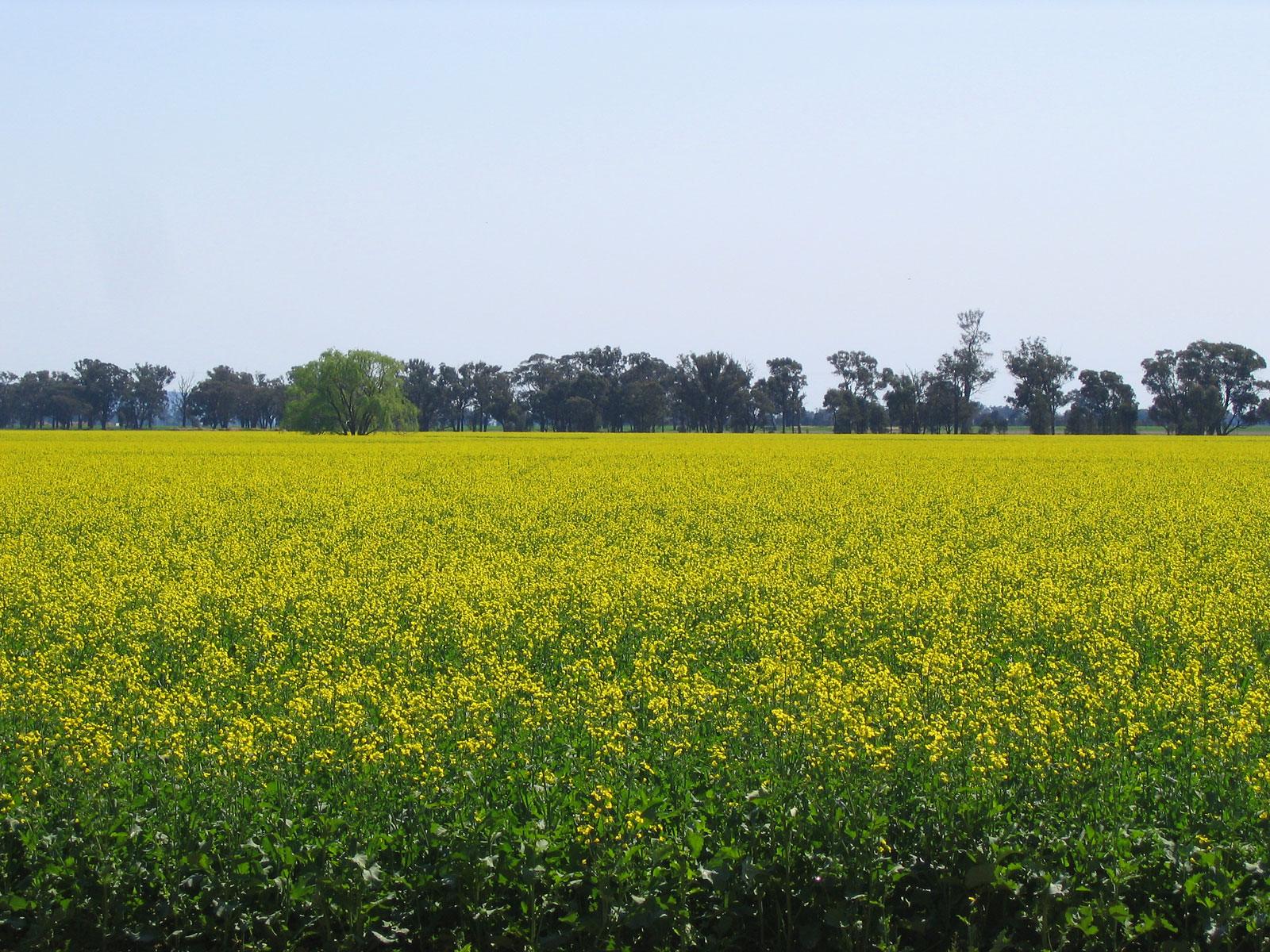
Canola field near Temora

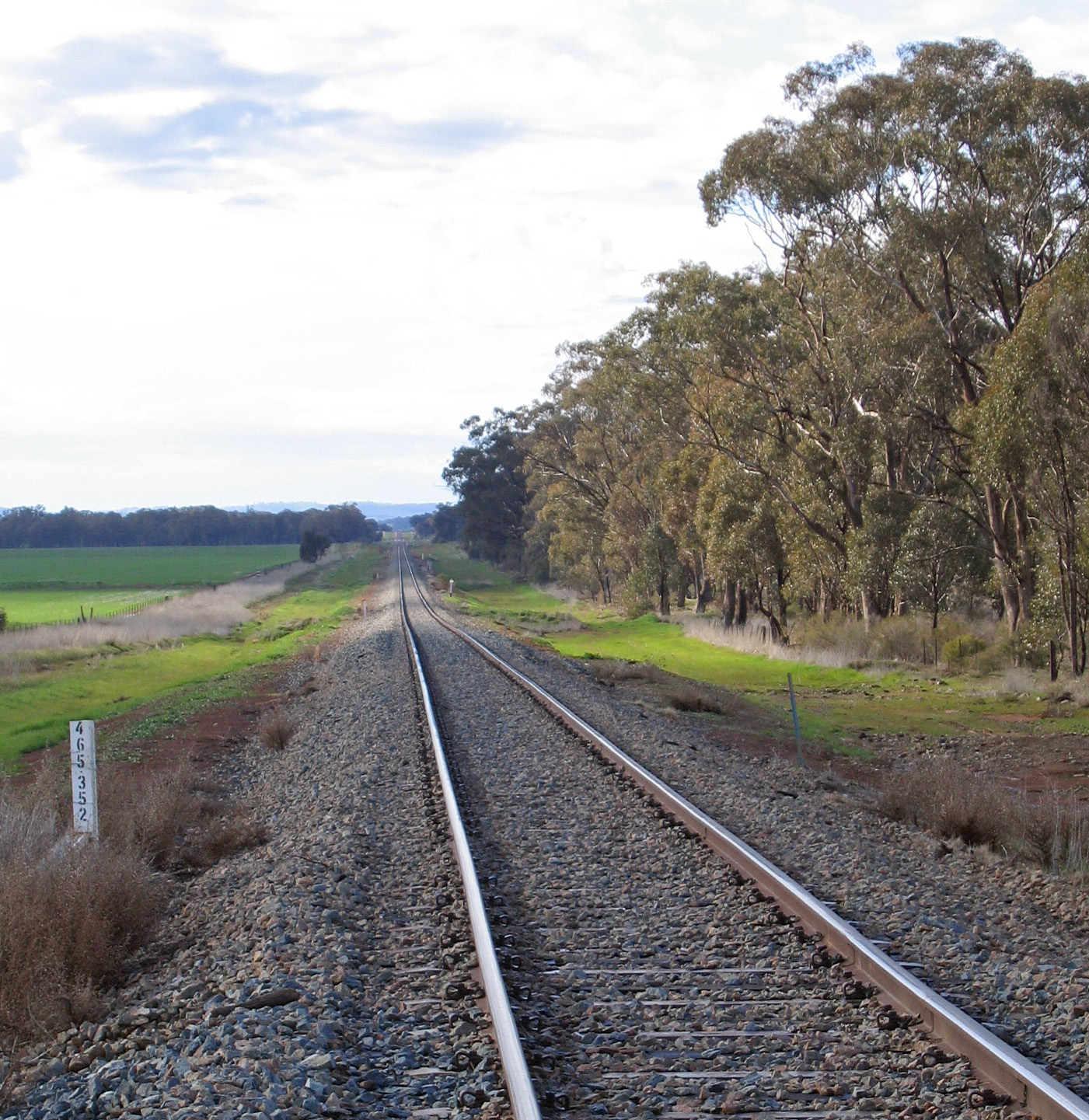
Railway line near Temora

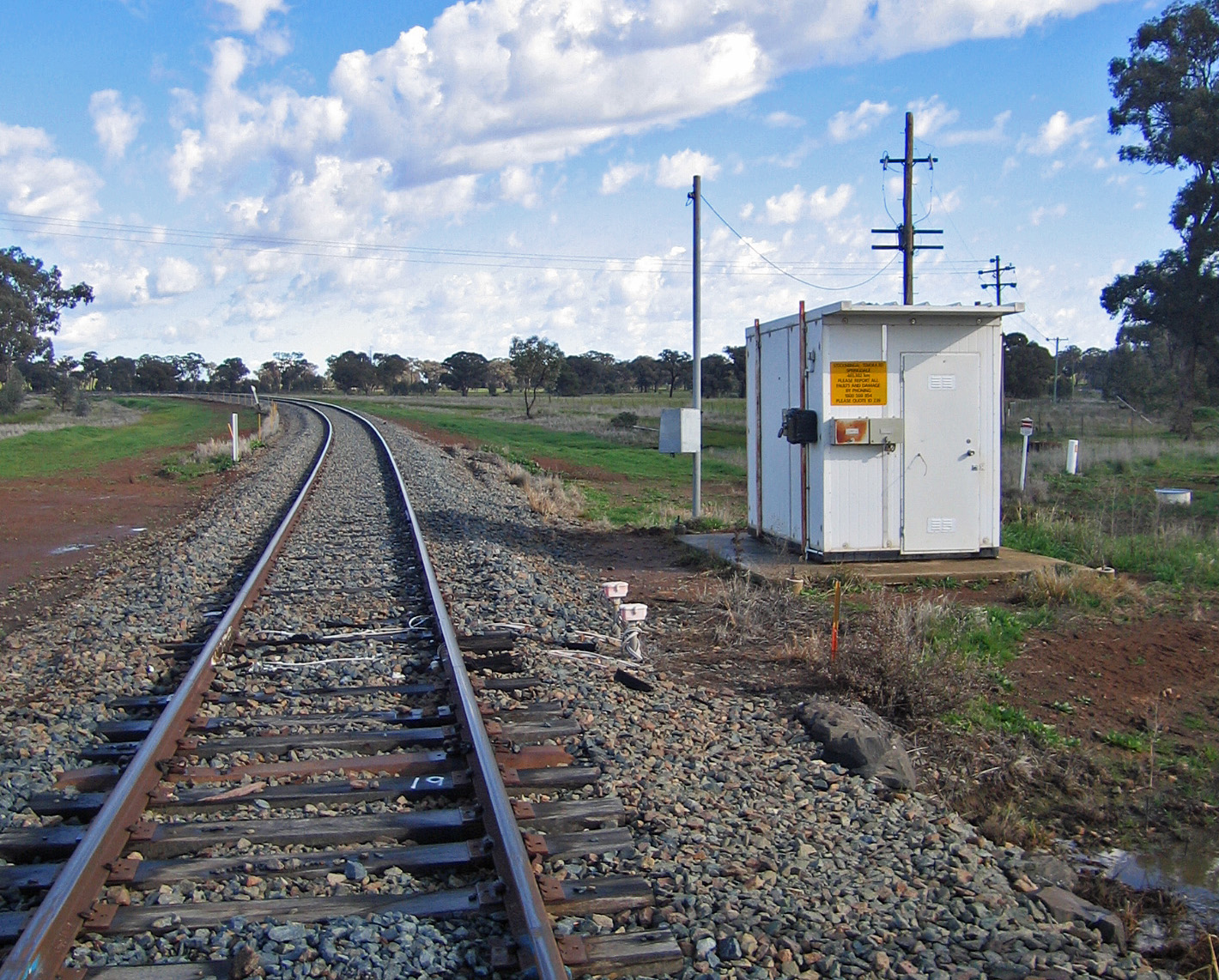
Railway line near Temora

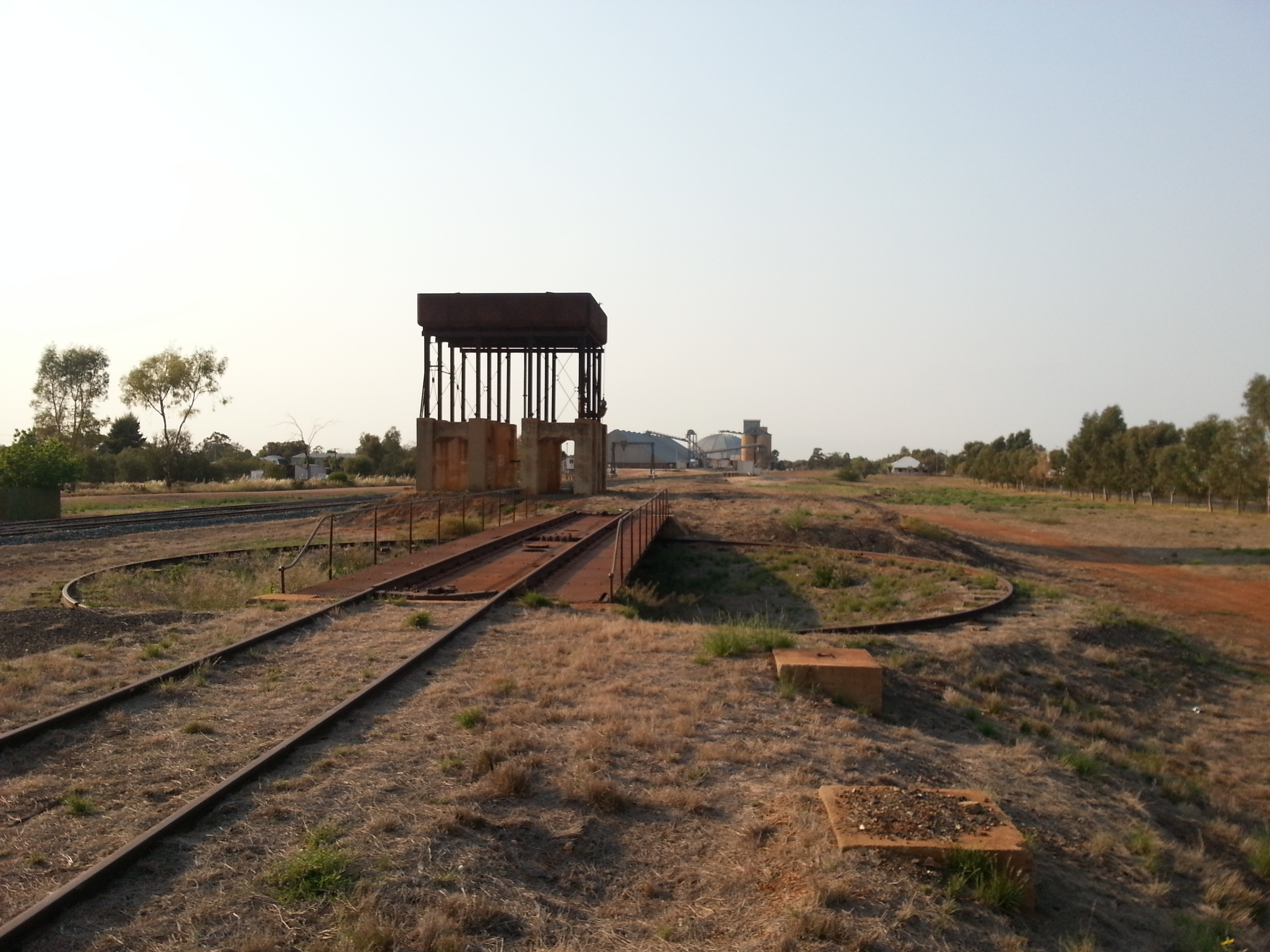
Lake Cargelligo Water Tower & Turntable

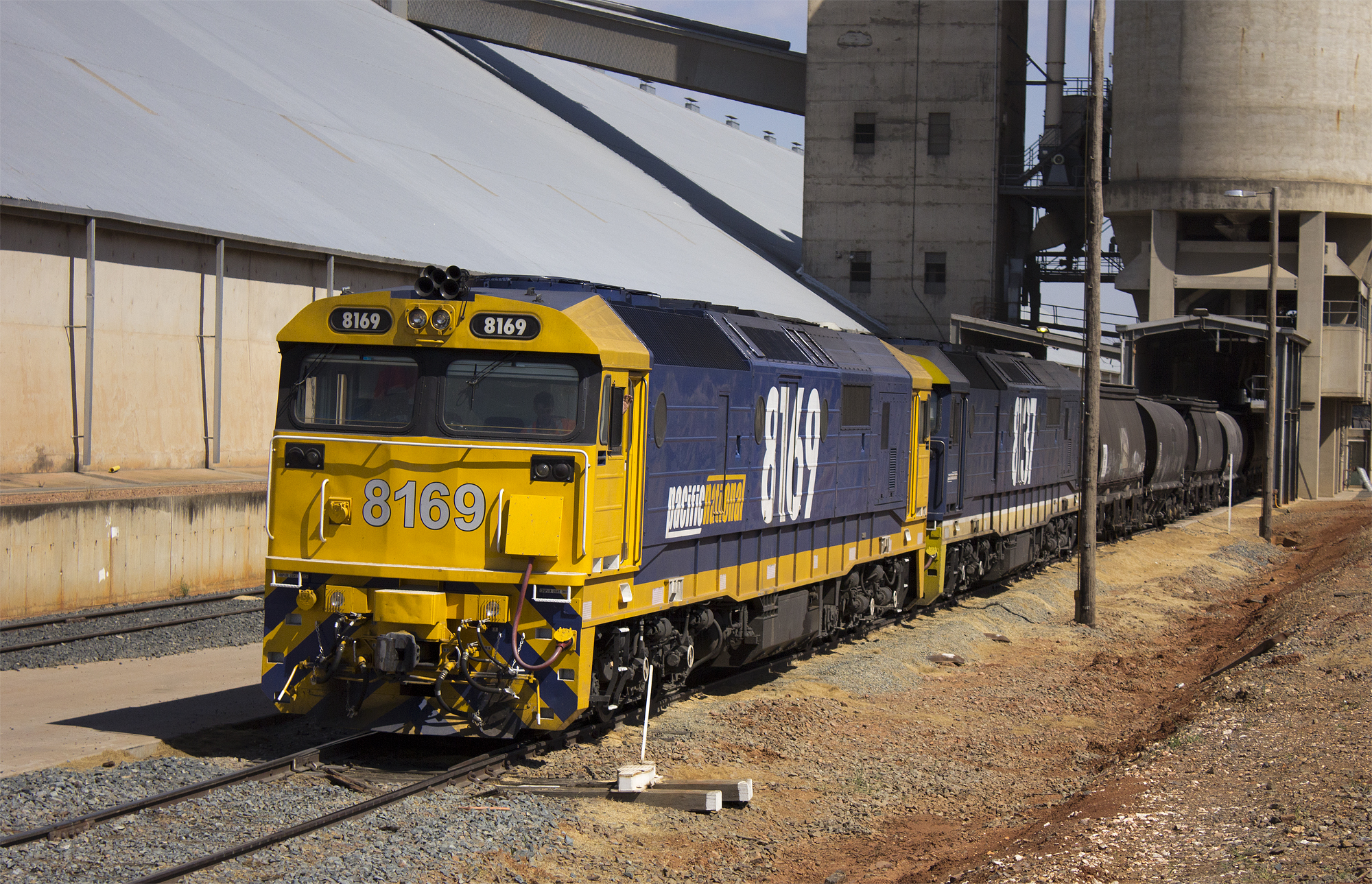
Temora Sub Terminal

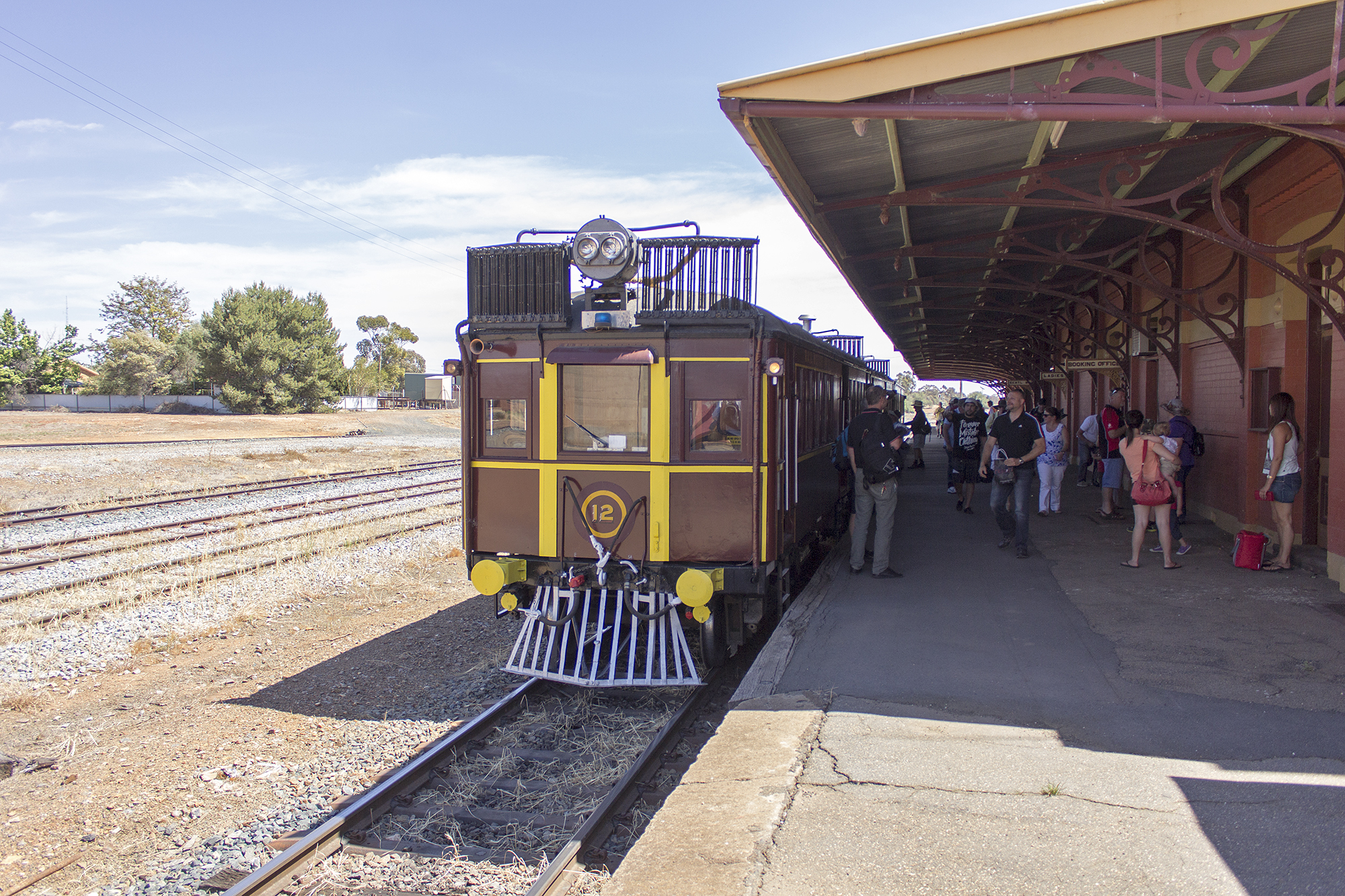
Temora railway station

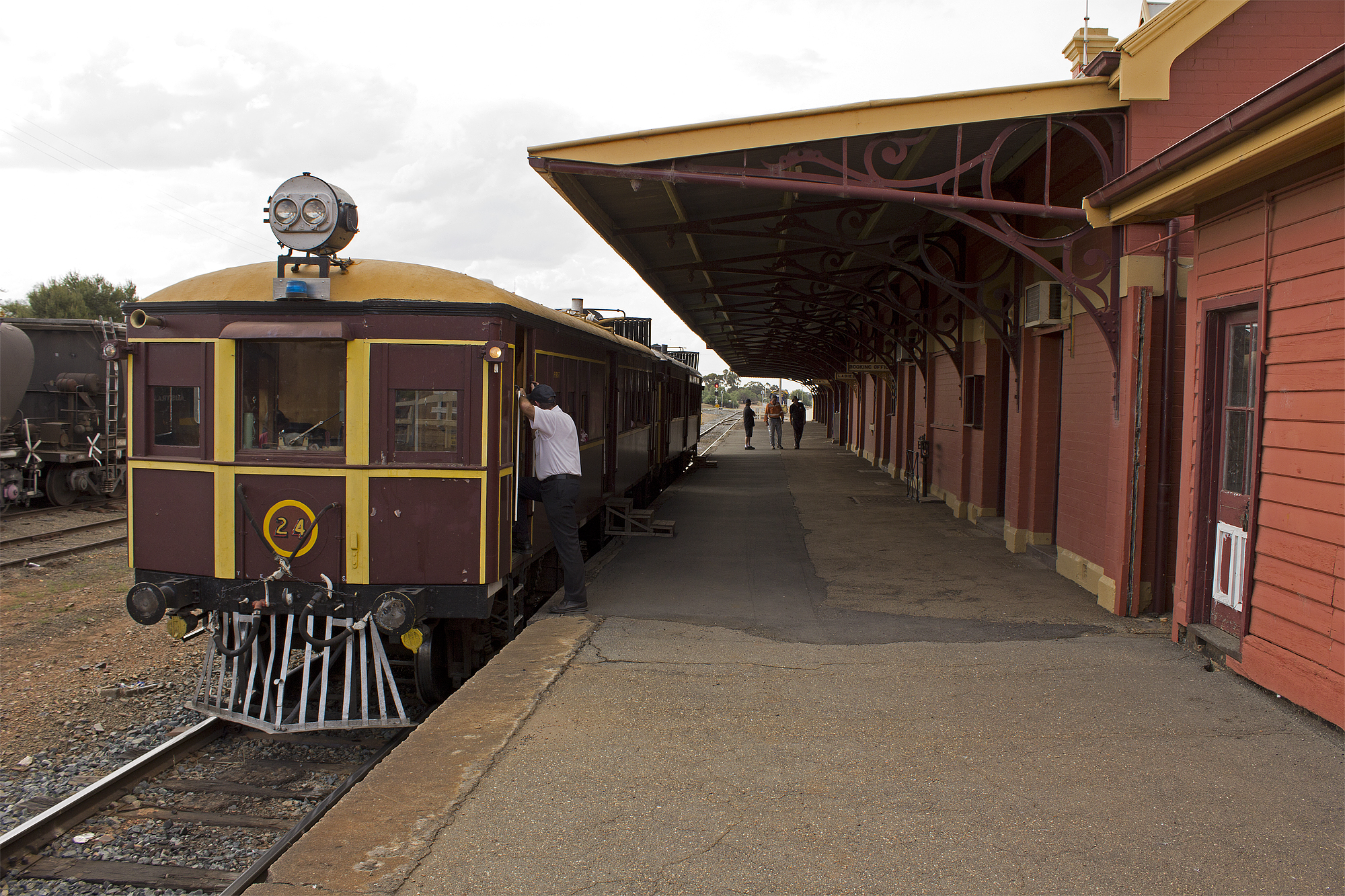

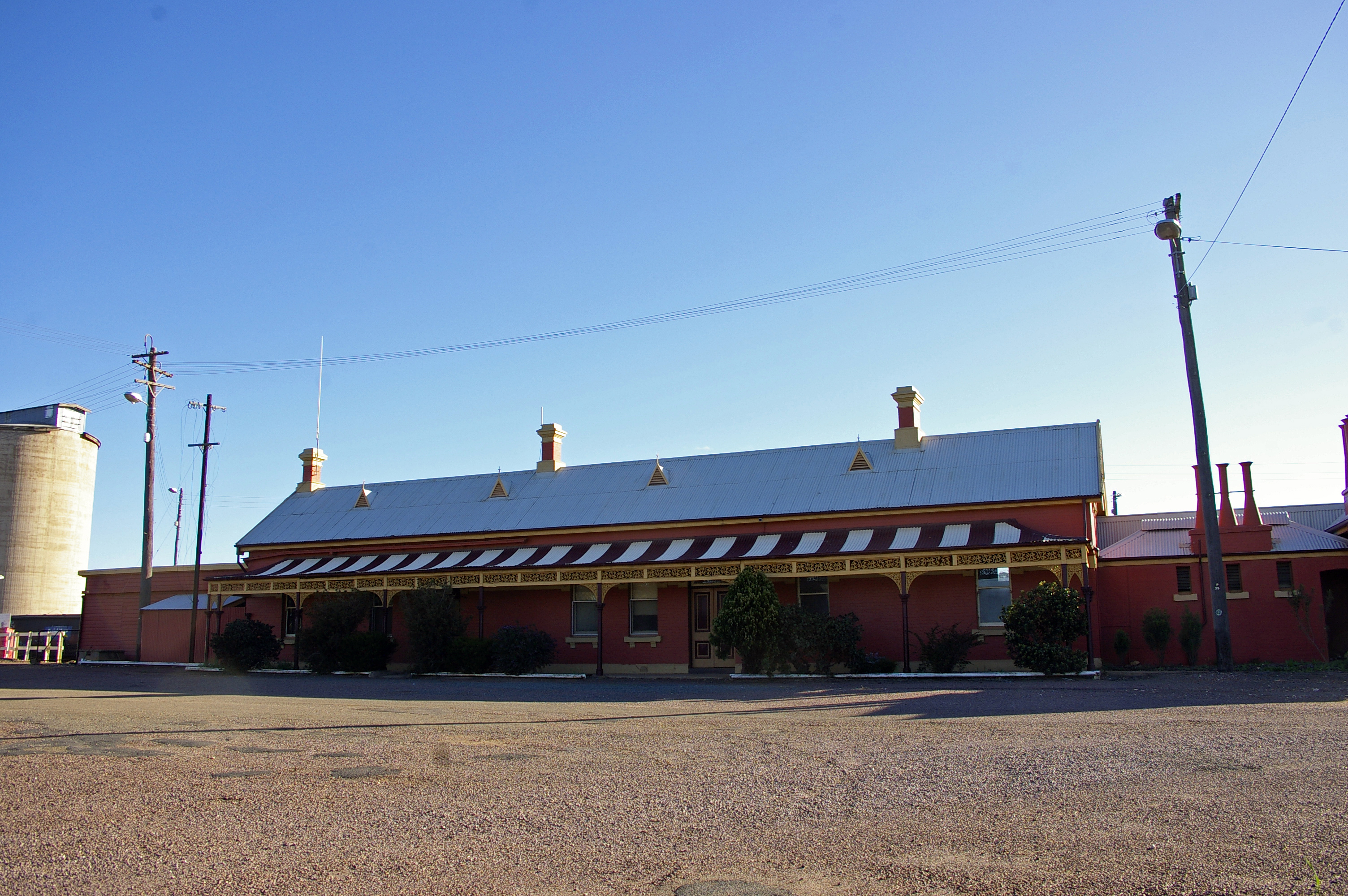
Temora Railway Station

== Media ==
=== Print ===
The Temora Independent is produced in Temora. The distribution area includes Temora, Coolamon, Ariah Park, Ardlethan, Barmedman, Ganmain, Marrar, Stockinbingal, Barellan and Quandialla.

=== Radio ===
TemFM 102.5 (Temora & District Community Radio), is a community radio station based in Temora which aims to inform and entertain the people of Temora and the surrounding district.

=== Video ===
Facing the retirement of three of its eight doctors, the town came together to produce a video appeal for replacements, entitled the 'Great Quack Quest'.

== Notable people ==
- Trent Barrett, National Rugby League footballer and Dally M Medal winner
- Jake Barrett, Australian rules footballer
- Luke Breust, Australian rules footballer
- Steph Cooke, Business owner and member of NSW Parliament
- Angus Crichton, Rugby League footballer
- Archer Denness, Australian Army officer and Military Cross recipient
- Brett Firman, Rugby League footballer
- Nan Fullarton, artist, writer, and designer
- Ryan Hinchcliffe, Rugby League footballer
- Raymond Hogan, first-class cricketer for Northamptonshire
- Kate Jennings, poet, essayist, memoirist, and novelist
- Brad Kahlefeldt, world champion triathlete
- Mark Kerry, Olympic gold medal swimmer, member of the "Quietly Confident Quartet"
- Zac Lomax, Rugby League footballer
- Andrew Manning, Professional Australia rules footballer
- Liam Martin, Rugby League footballer
- Josh McCrone, Rugby League footballer
- Don McAlpine, cinema photographer
- Marie Narelle, "Australian queen of Irish song"
- Todd Payten, Rugby League footballer
- Col Ratcliff, Rugby League footballer
- Scott Reardon, World Champion Water-Skier and Australian Paralympian
- Steve Reardon, Rugby League footballer
- Cate Shortland, writer and director of film and television

== See also ==
- Temora Aviation Museum

== Sources ==
- Riverina Regional Development Board – Temora Profile
