= West Wyalong =

- Town
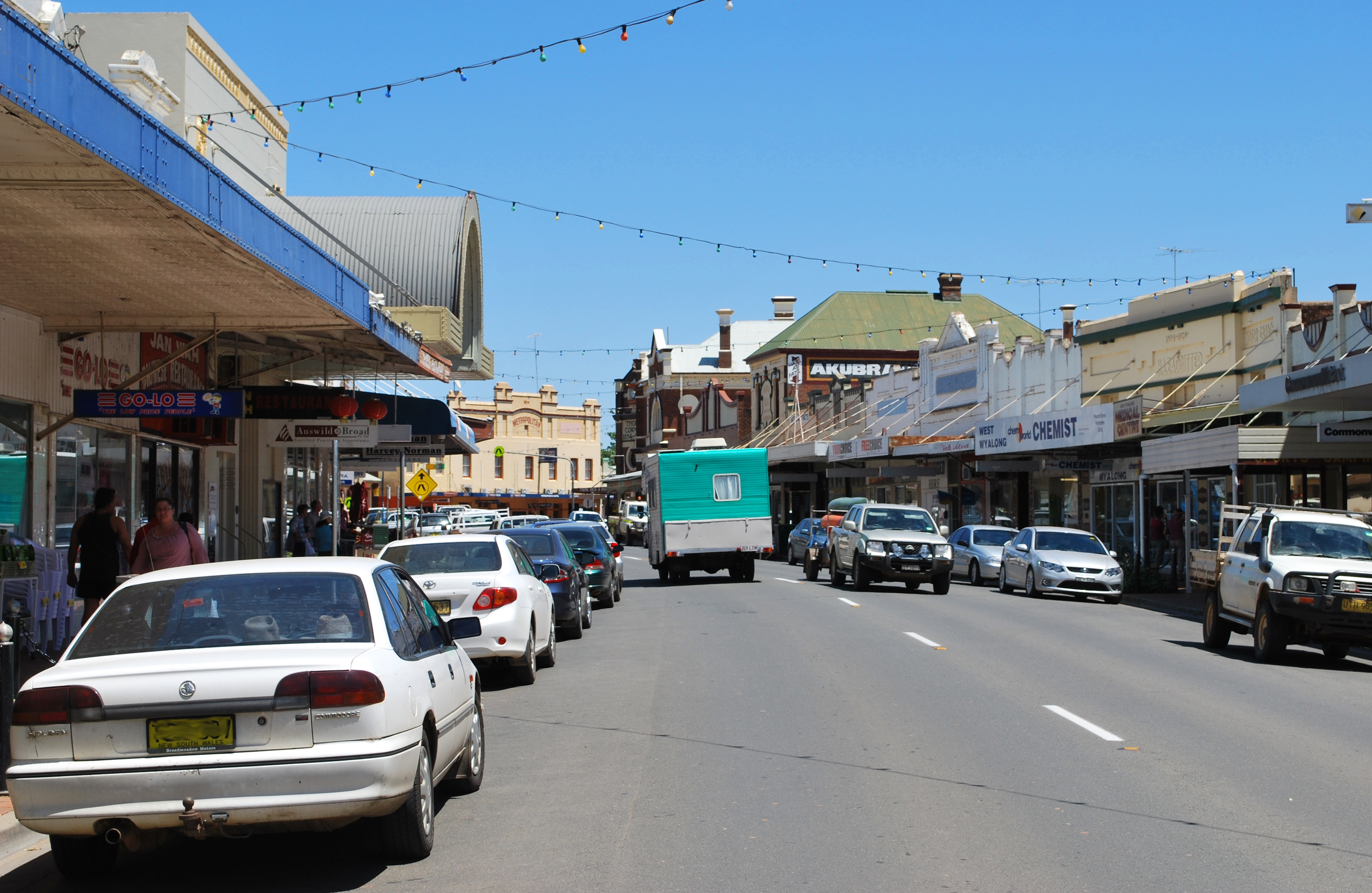
- Main Street (Newell Highway) in West Wyalong

- Coordinates: 33°55′0″S 147°13′0″E
- Country: Australia
- State: New South Wales
- Region: Riverina (New South Wales)
- LGA: Bland Shire
- Location: 467 km (290 mi) W of Sydney; 93 km (58 mi) E of Rankins Springs; 104 km (65 mi) SW of Forbes

Government
  - State electorate: Cootamundra
  - Federal division: Parkes
- Elevation: 262 m (860 ft)

Population
  - Total: 2,698 (UCL 2021)
- Postcode: 2671
- Mean max temp: 23.5 °C (74.3 °F)
- Mean min temp: 10.1 °C (50.2 °F)
- Annual rainfall: 485.8 mm (19.13 in)

West Wyalong is the main town of the Bland Shire in the northern Riverina region of western New South Wales, Australia. In the 2021 Census, West Wyalong's population was 3,037.

Located 467 kilometres (290 mi) west of Sydney as well as being 262 m (860 ft) above sea level, it is situated on the crossroads of the Newell Highway between Melbourne and Brisbane, and the Mid-Western Highway between Sydney and Adelaide.

The West Wyalong district is the largest cereal-growing centre in NSW. Eucalyptus oil production started in 1907 and the West Wyalong area became one of the major world exporters of the product.

== History ==
=== Indigenous history ===
The Wiradjuri people were the first to inhabit this region. (Wiradjuri northern dialect pronunciation [wiraːjd̪uːraj]) or Wirraayjuurray people (Wiradjuri southern dialect pronunciation [wiraːjɟuːraj]) are a group of indigenous Australian Aboriginal people that were united by a common language, strong ties of kinship and survived as skilled hunter–fisher–gatherers in family groups or clans scattered throughout central New South Wales.

The name Wyalong comes from the Wiradjuri name Waaylang, meaning hard shelled nut. This refers to the quandong seed, which was ground and used for flour, and is still found in the area.

In the 21st century, major Wiradjuri groups live in Condobolin, Peak Hill, Narrandera and Griffith. There are significant populations at Wagga Wagga, Lake Cargelligo and Leeton and smaller groups at West Wyalong, Parkes, Dubbo, Forbes, Cootamundra, Cowra and Young.

=== Gold rush ===
Gold was discovered at Wyalong in September 1893 by Joseph Neeld. In 1895 West Wyalong was developed 5 kilometres (3 mi) from Wyalong around the bullock track, without the benefit of town planning, resulting in curious kinks in the road where it avoided trees. As well as the mines, the White Tank water supply was located here. This is now the location of McCann Park. The goldfield was declared the most productive in the colony in 1899.

As mining declined West Wyalong became the main service centre for agriculture in the surrounding district, although for many years there was rivalry between the towns. Both towns wanted the Temora railway line, but settled on a compromise of a station midway between the two towns, called Wyalong Central.

Development since the 1970s has expanded Wyalong in the direction of West Wyalong with several motels built at central Wyalong. A shared bicycle and pedestrian track was constructed in 1994 to link Wyalong with West Wyalong.

The population has stabilised recently. This is due, in part, to the Cowal Gold Mine adjacent to Lake Cowal, 45 km northeast and Pace Farm's egg production facility.

== Climate ==
West Wyalong features hot and dry summers; and cool winters with extended overcast periods not uncommon, with an increased susceptibility to cold fronts due to its western location. Mean maximum temperatures range substantially between the seasons. There is a stark difference in sky conditions between high summer and mid winter, especially for this northern latitude: in March there are 13.9 clear days and 6.0 cloudy days, whereas in July there are only 7.4 clear days but 12.5 cloudy days. This too is evident by the mean afternoon humidity readings. The last major snowfall in the township was in 1929.

Climate data for Wyalong Post Office (1950–2015, rainfall 1895–2022); 245 m AMSL; 33.93° S, 147.24° E
Month	Jan	Feb	Mar	Apr	May	Jun	Jul	Aug	Sep	Oct	Nov	Dec	Year
Record high °C (°F)	46.3 (115.3)	46.3 (115.3)	42.2 (108.0)	36.2 (97.2)	28.3 (82.9)	24.2 (75.6)	25.5 (77.9)	28.6 (83.5)	34.6 (94.3)	38.0 (100.4)	43.6 (110.5)	44.6 (112.3)	46.3 (115.3)
Mean daily maximum °C (°F)	32.9 (91.2)	31.9 (89.4)	28.7 (83.7)	23.7 (74.7)	18.7 (65.7)	14.9 (58.8)	14.1 (57.4)	16.0 (60.8)	19.6 (67.3)	23.5 (74.3)	27.3 (81.1)	30.7 (87.3)	23.5 (74.3)
Mean daily minimum °C (°F)	17.6 (63.7)	17.5 (63.5)	14.5 (58.1)	10.0 (50.0)	6.8 (44.2)	4.2 (39.6)	3.0 (37.4)	3.9 (39.0)	6.2 (43.2)	9.4 (48.9)	12.6 (54.7)	15.4 (59.7)	10.1 (50.2)
Record low °C (°F)	6.7 (44.1)	6.9 (44.4)	4.9 (40.8)	−1.1 (30.0)	−3.0 (26.6)	−4.5 (23.9)	−5.6 (21.9)	−4.5 (23.9)	−3.0 (26.6)	0.6 (33.1)	2.0 (35.6)	5.5 (41.9)	−5.6 (21.9)
Average precipitation mm (inches)	42.7 (1.68)	38.6 (1.52)	39.7 (1.56)	34.9 (1.37)	39.1 (1.54)	43.1 (1.70)	41.8 (1.65)	39.1 (1.54)	37.5 (1.48)	45.4 (1.79)	38.3 (1.51)	43.7 (1.72)	485.8 (19.13)
Average precipitation days (≥ 0.2 mm)	5.0	4.5	4.8	4.7	6.6	8.6	9.8	9.0	7.3	6.9	5.7	5.4	78.3
Average afternoon relative humidity (%)	32	35	37	43	51	61	62	53	46	39	35	34	44
Source 1: Wyalong Post Office (general data, 1895–2022)
Source 2: West Wyalong Airport AWS (extreme temperatures, 1999–2025)

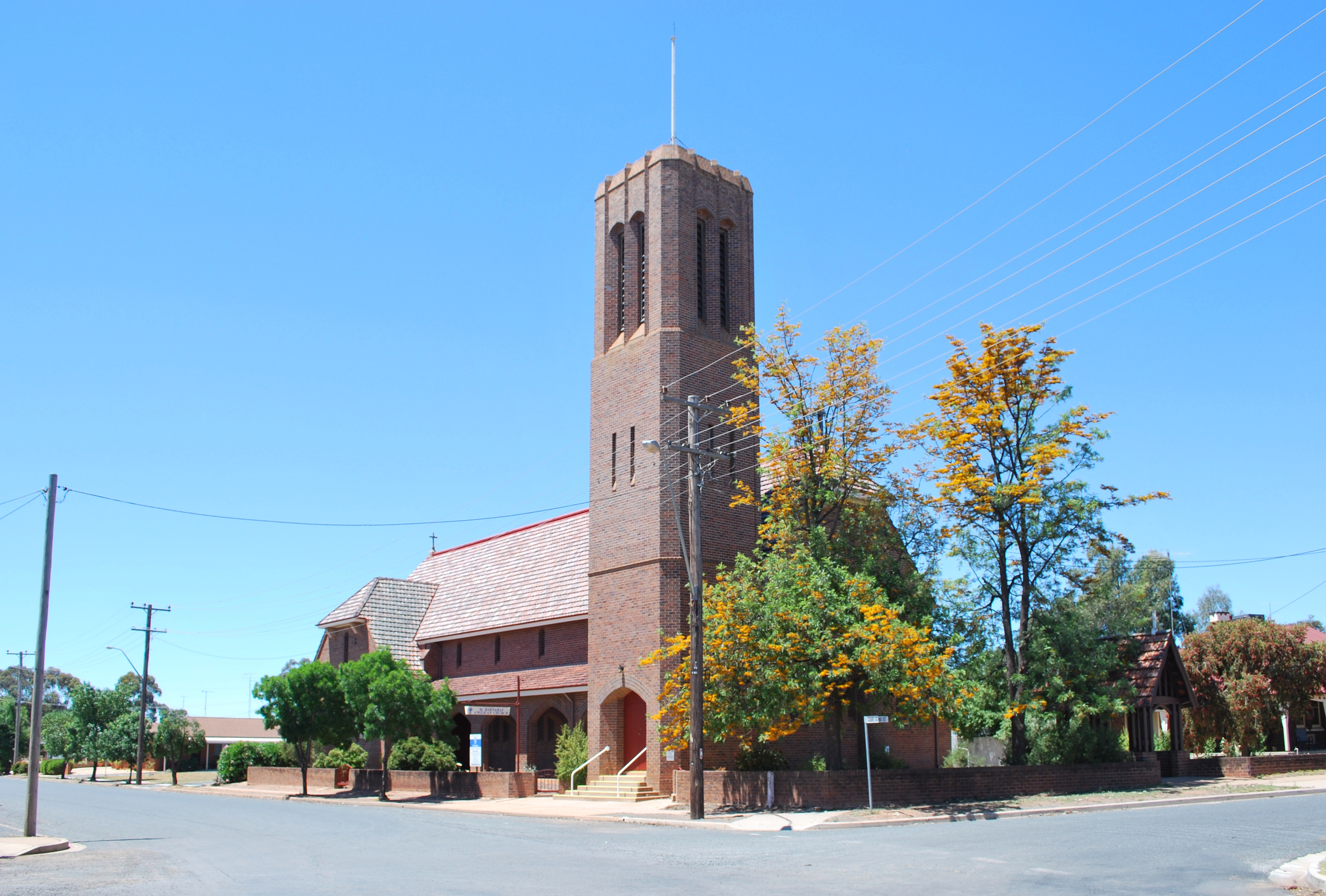
West Wyalong Anglican Church

== Places of interest ==
- The Poppet Head
- Lions Park Dakota DC3
- West Wyalong Museum
- The Sister Kissing Booth
- West Wyalong Airport
- Easel sculpture of West Wyalong (Drysdale)
- Wyalong Wetlands
- Tivoli Theatre

=== Schools ===
- St Mary's War Memorial Catholic School (K–6) – The original St. Mary's Church School was built in 1901 of corrugated iron and staffed by the Sisters of Mercy. By 1903 there were 167 students. The present St. Mary's School was built in 1961.
- West Wyalong Primary School (K–6)
- West Wyalong High School (7–12)
- Wyalong Public School (K–6)

== Sport ==
The most popular sport in West Wyalong is rugby league. The Goldfields Rugby League was established in 1911, and, along with Tamworth and Wollongong, was one of the first leagues outside of Sydney and Newcastle.

The town hosts a number of different sports club, catering for both adults and junior players.

- West Wyalong Mallee Men – rugby league and competes in the Group 20 Rugby League competition.
- West Wyalong-Girral Bulldogs – Australian rules football & netball and competes in the Northern Riverina Football League
- West Wyalong Weevils – senior rugby union
- West Wyalong Pirates – junior rugby union
- West Wyalong Wildcats – (basketball)
- Alleena Cricket Club – cricket
- Tallimba Cricket Club – cricket
- White Tank Cricket Club – cricket

== Annual shows and events ==
=== January ===
- Australia Day Breakfast and Awards (26th), West Wyalong
- David Earl Memorial Cricket Match, West Wyalong

=== February ===
- Pancake Breakfast, West Wyalong
- West Wyalong Rugby League Knockout (Last Friday/Saturday)
- Dean Wood Big Gig

=== March ===
- Barmedman Modified tractor Pull (1st Saturday)
- Candy Stripe Fair, West Wyalong

=== April ===
- Anzac Day Celebrations (25th)
- Wellness West Wyalong Festival
- Ladies Day Out in West Wyalong

=== May ===
- Mother's Day Luncheon (2nd Sunday), West Wyalong
- Masonic Debutante Ball (2nd Saturday), West Wyalong

=== July ===
- Catholic Debutante Ball, West Wyalong

=== August ===
- Weethalle Show (3rd Saturday)
- West Wyalong Show Ball

=== September ===
- Barmedman Show & Beaut-Ute Competition (1st Saturday/Sunday)
- West Wyalong Show (1st Wednesday)
- Ungarie Show (2nd Friday)
- West Wyalong Charity Campdraft

=== October ===
- Mirrool Silo Kick Challenge (2nd Sat.)
- 'in the West' Festival www.inthewest.com.au

=== November ===
- Early Markets (1st Saturday), Wyalong

=== December ===
- Christmas Market/Carols by Candlelight, West Wyalong
- New year Celebrations & Bi-annual Fireworks, West Wyalong

== Notable people from the area ==
- Dymphna Cusack, author
- Reginald Roy Rattey, Victoria Cross recipient
- Terry Gathercole, champion swimmer
- Mark O'Meley, rugby league footballer
- Ron Crowe, Australian representative rugby league footballer
- Col Ratcliff, rugby league footballer
- Liam Martin, rugby league footballer
- Tony Gelling, rugby union footballer
- Scott Staniforth, rugby union footballer
- Mat McLachlan, author and historian
- Neale Daniher AM, former AFL footballer, former AFL coach and motor neurone disease campaigner
- Terry Daniher, former AFL footballer
- Anthony Daniher, former AFL footballer
- Chris Daniher, former AFL footballer
- Dal Stivens, author – grew up in the town
- Danny Meagher, Catholic bishop

== Gallery ==
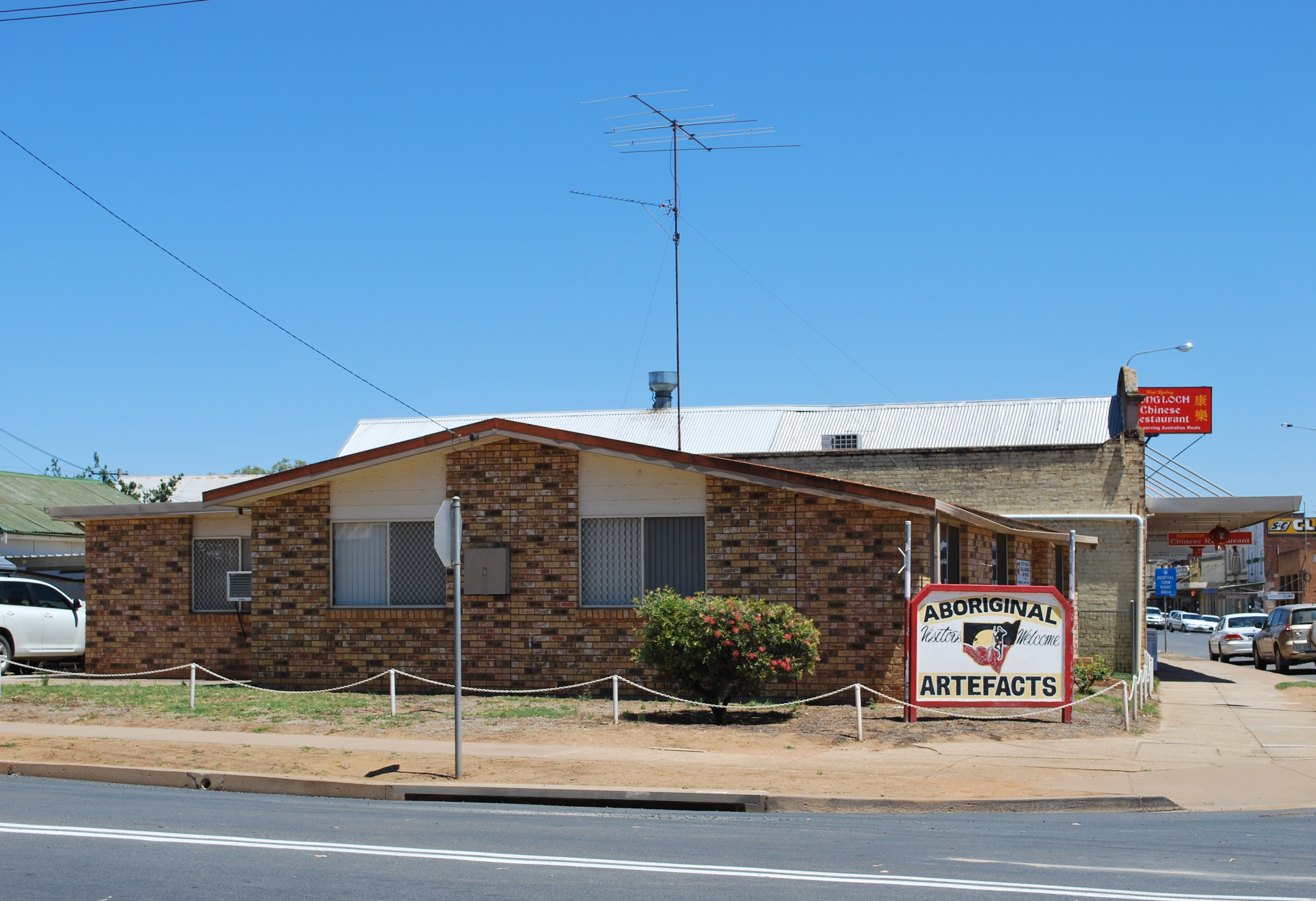
Aboriginal Artifacts Store

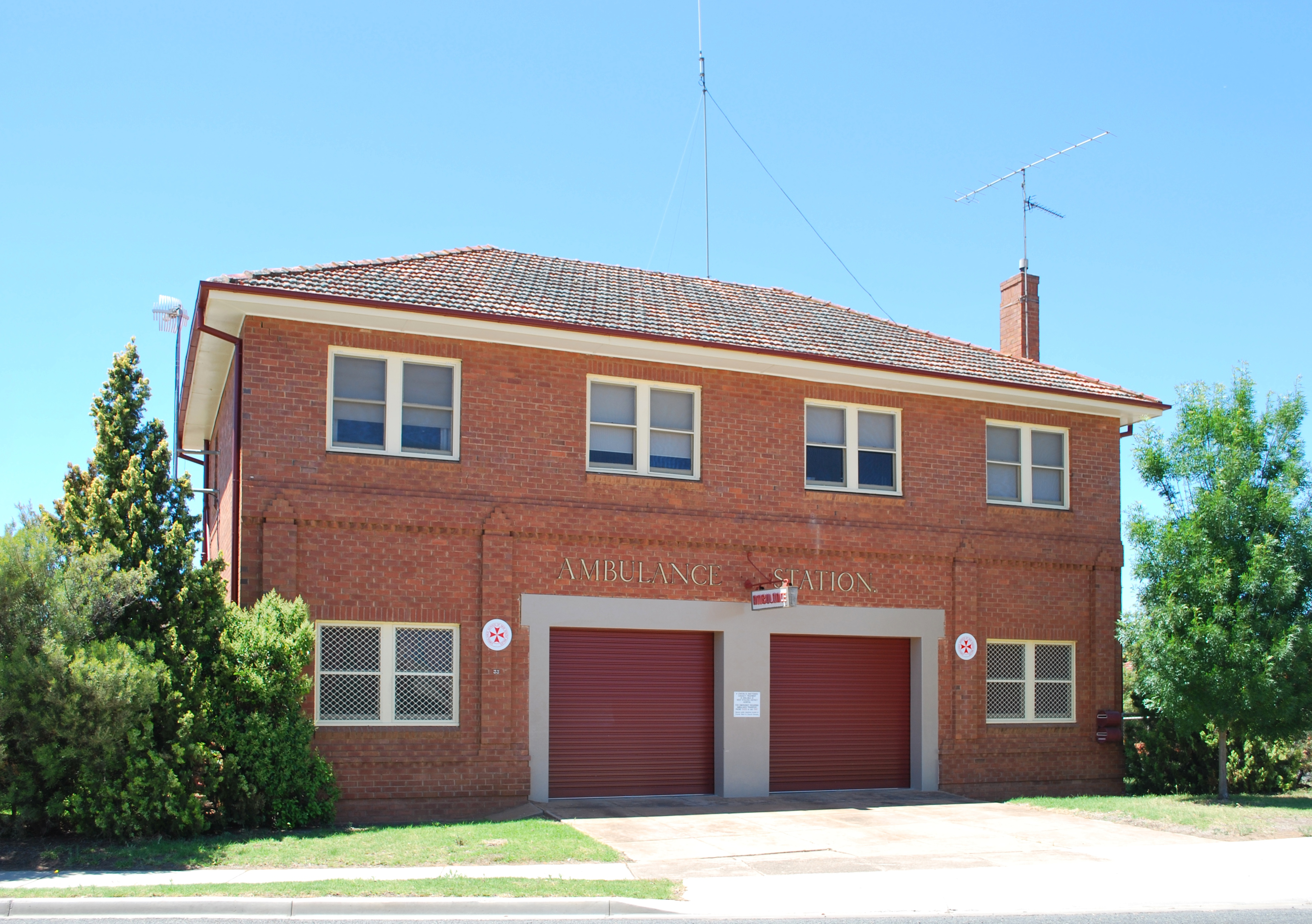
Ambulance Station

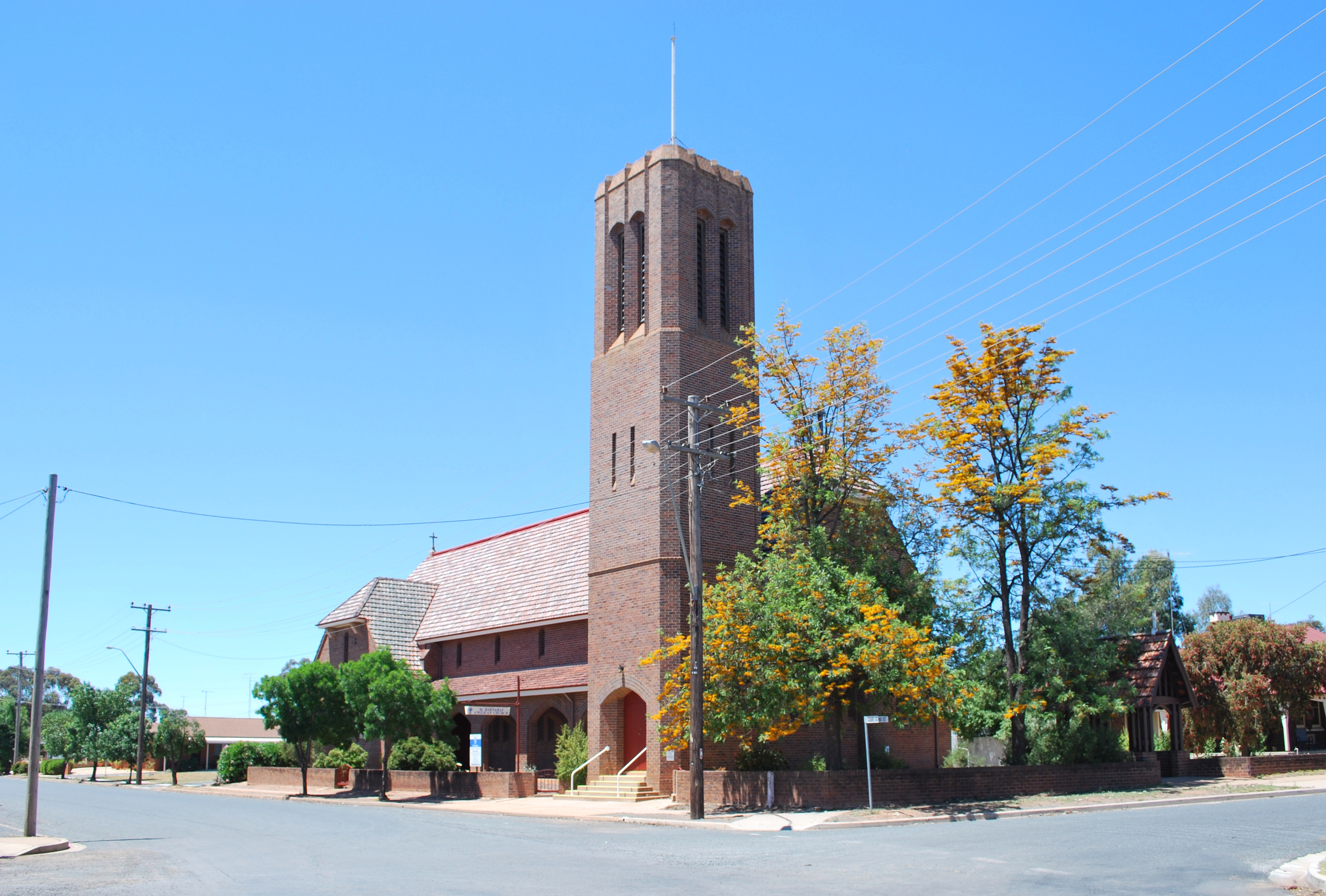
West Wyalong Anglican Church

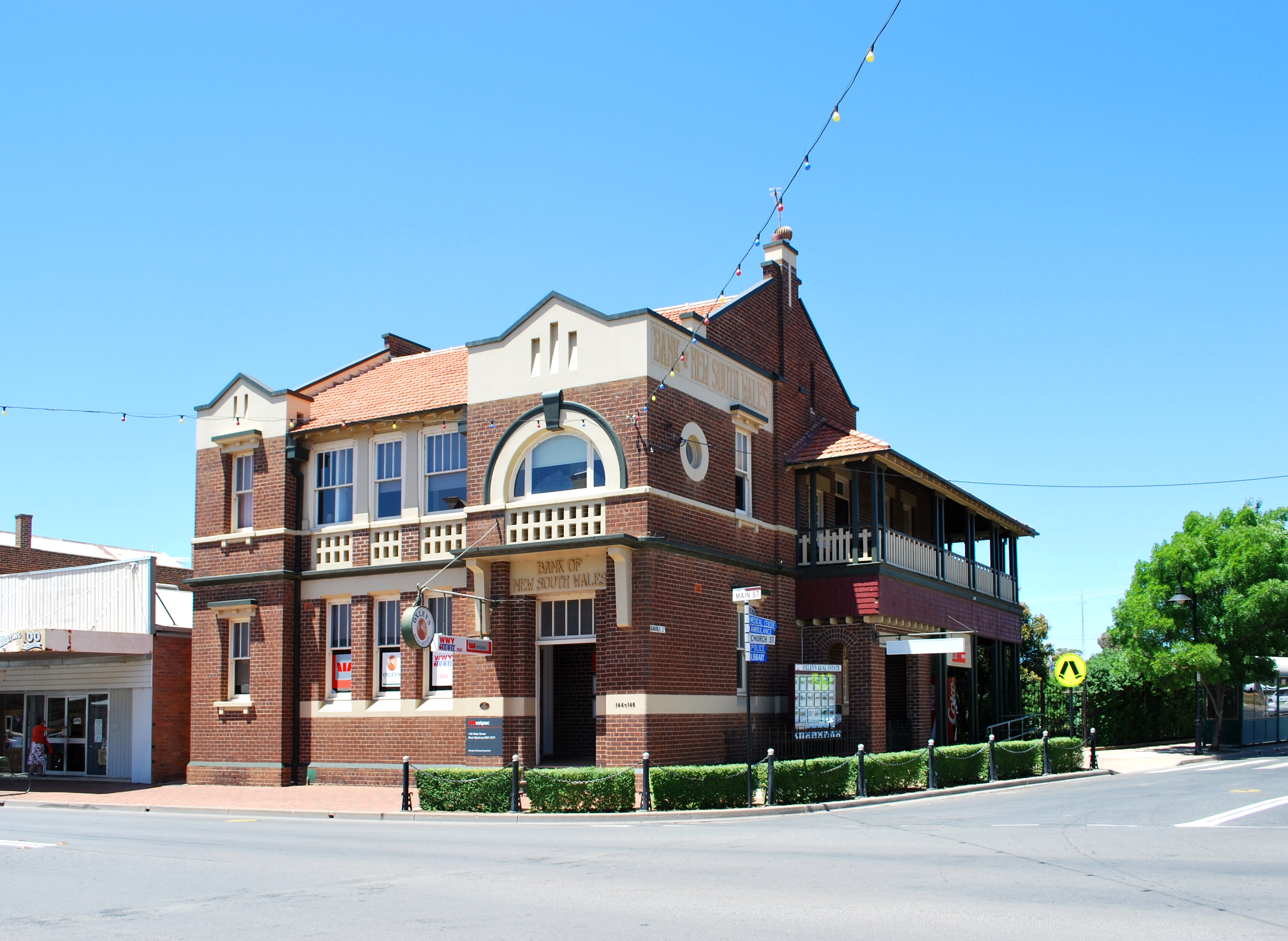
Bank of New South Wales

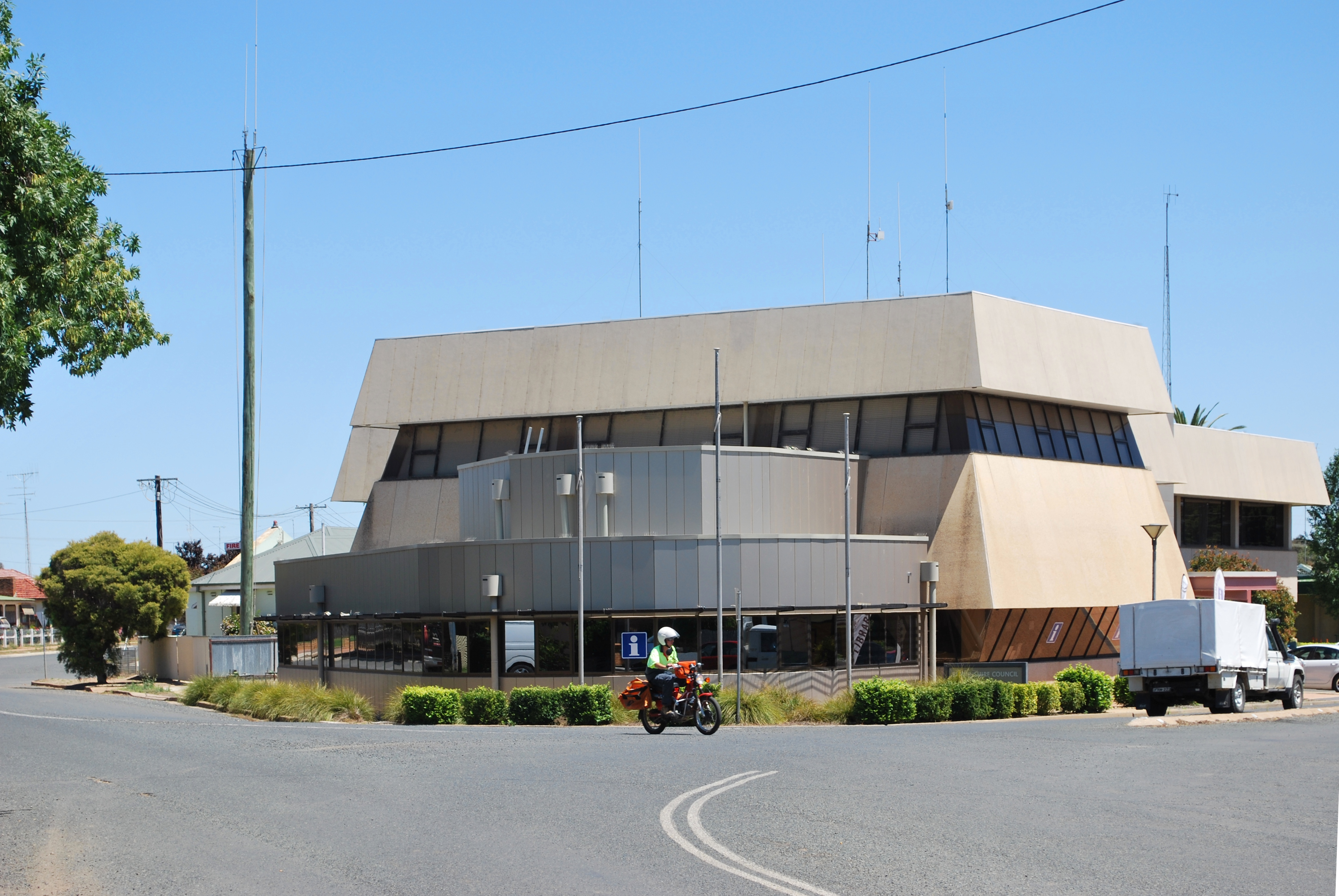
Bland Shire Council Offices

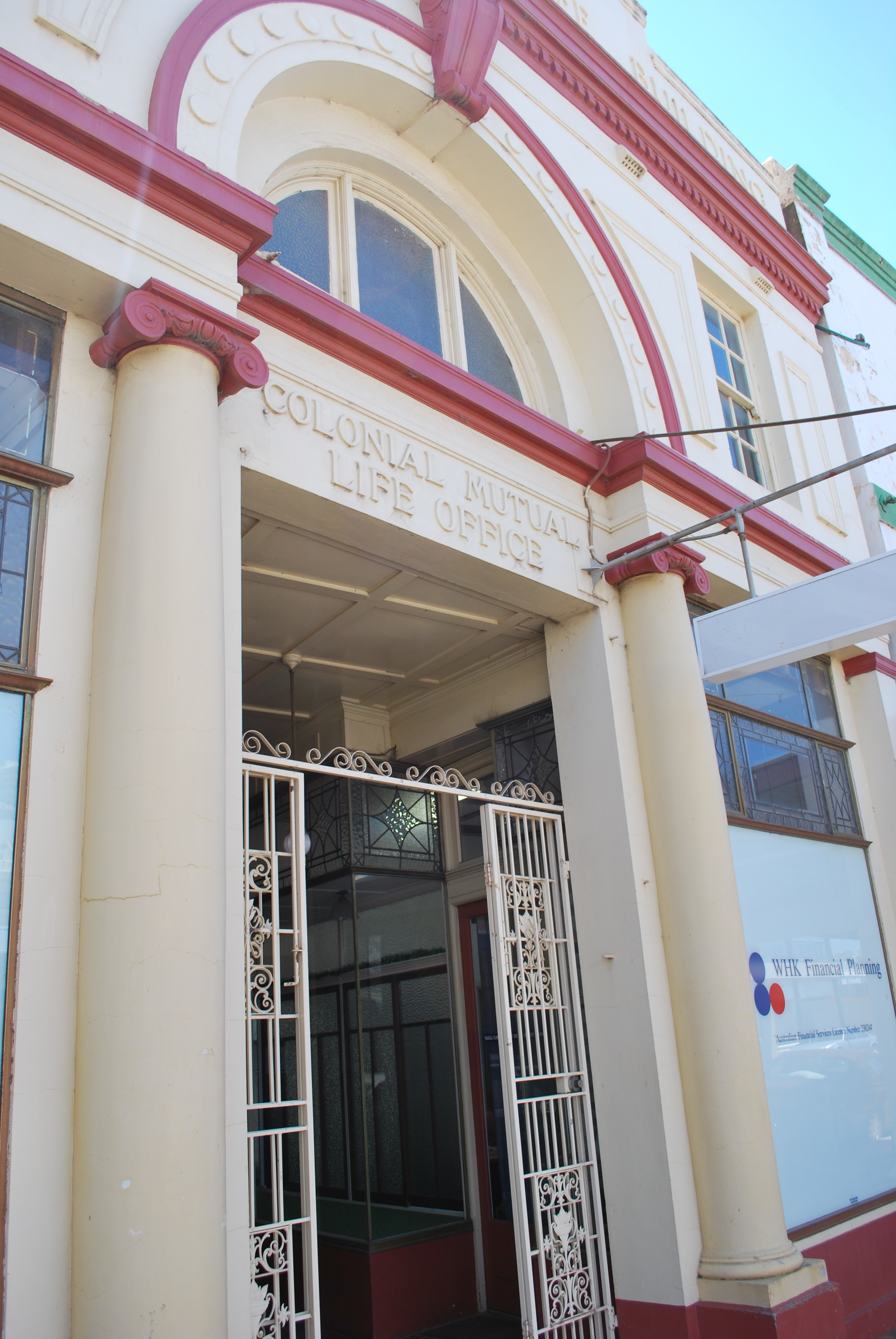
Colonial Mutual

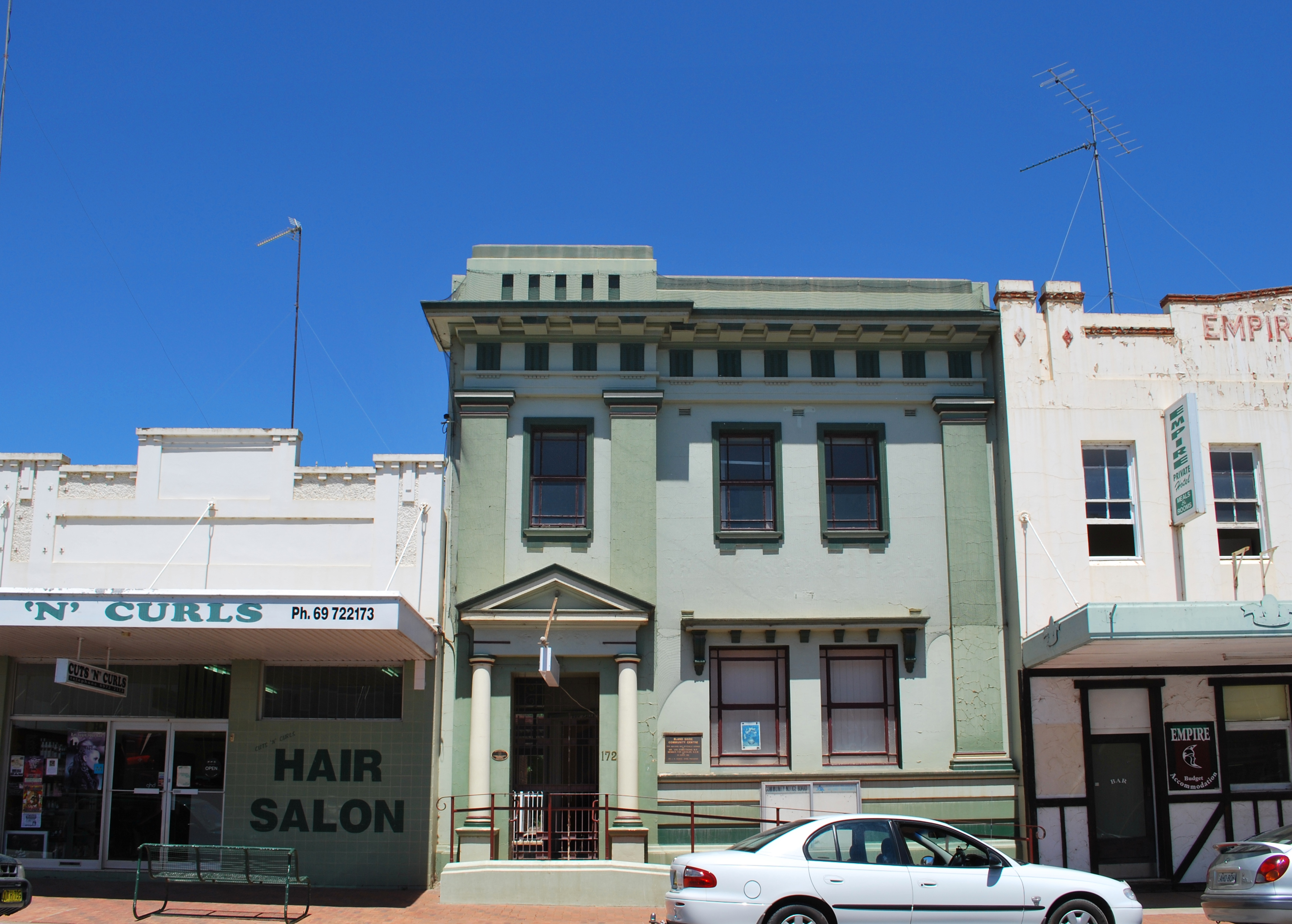
Commercial Bank of Australia

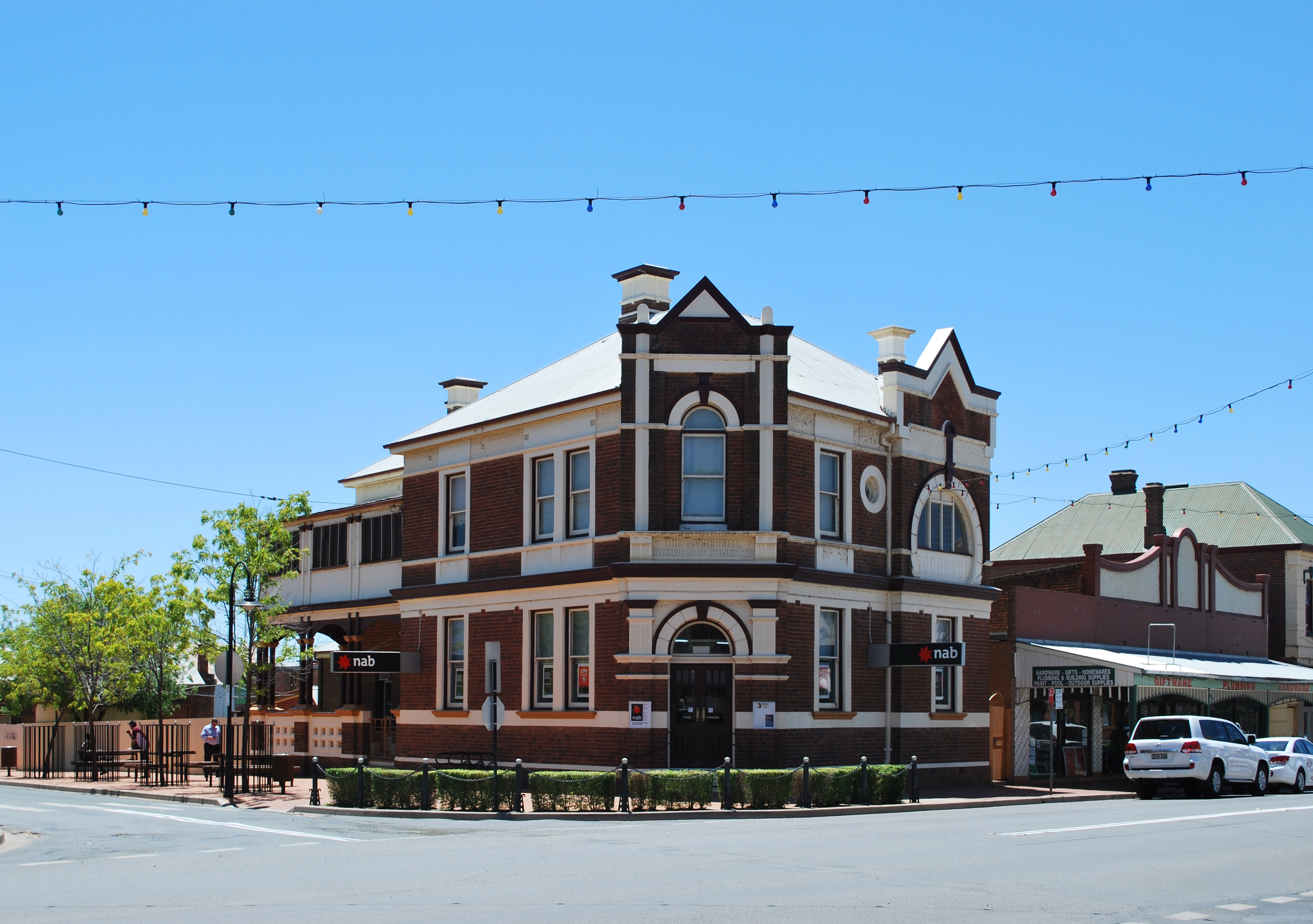
Commercial Bank of Australia

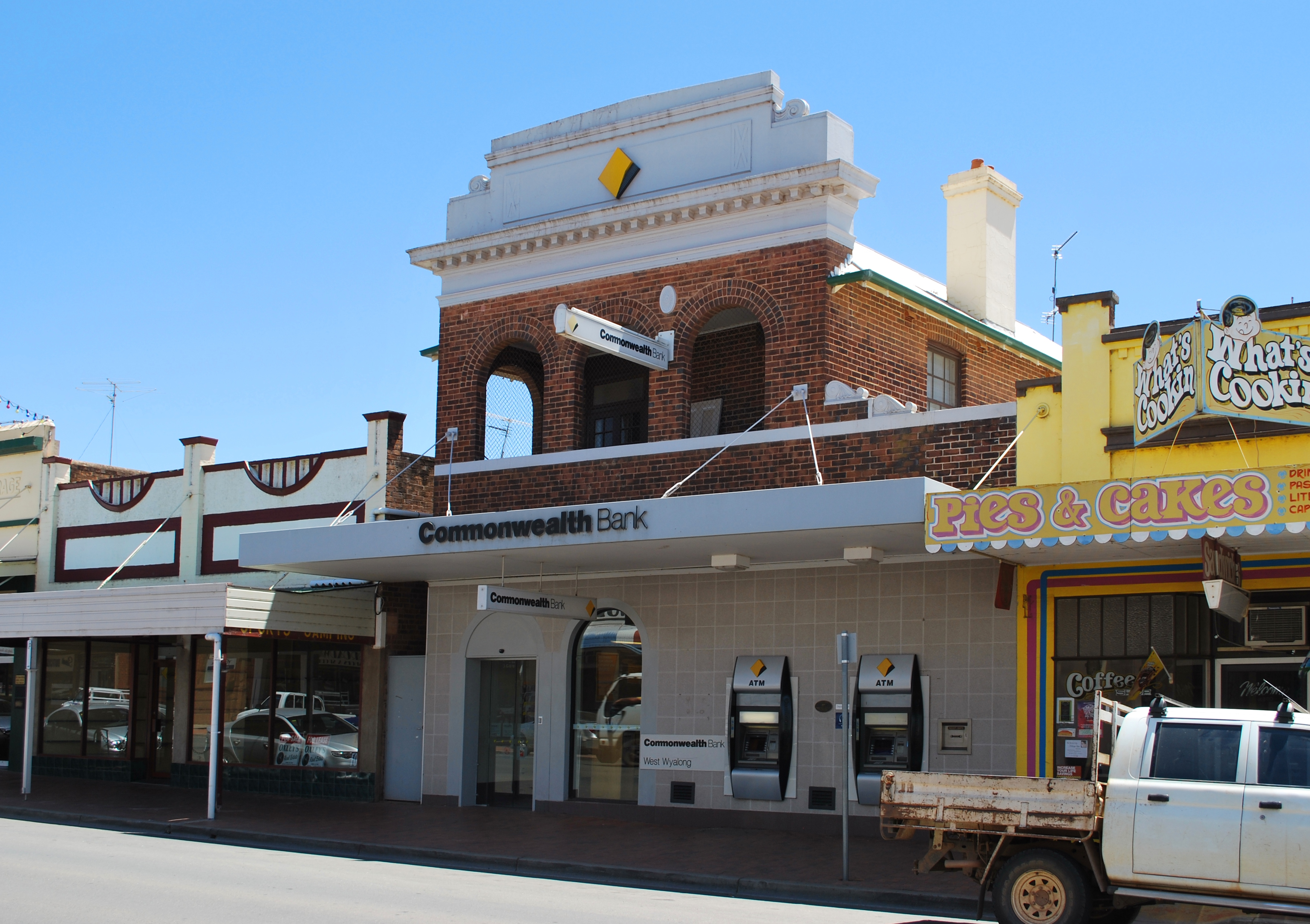
Commonwealth Bank

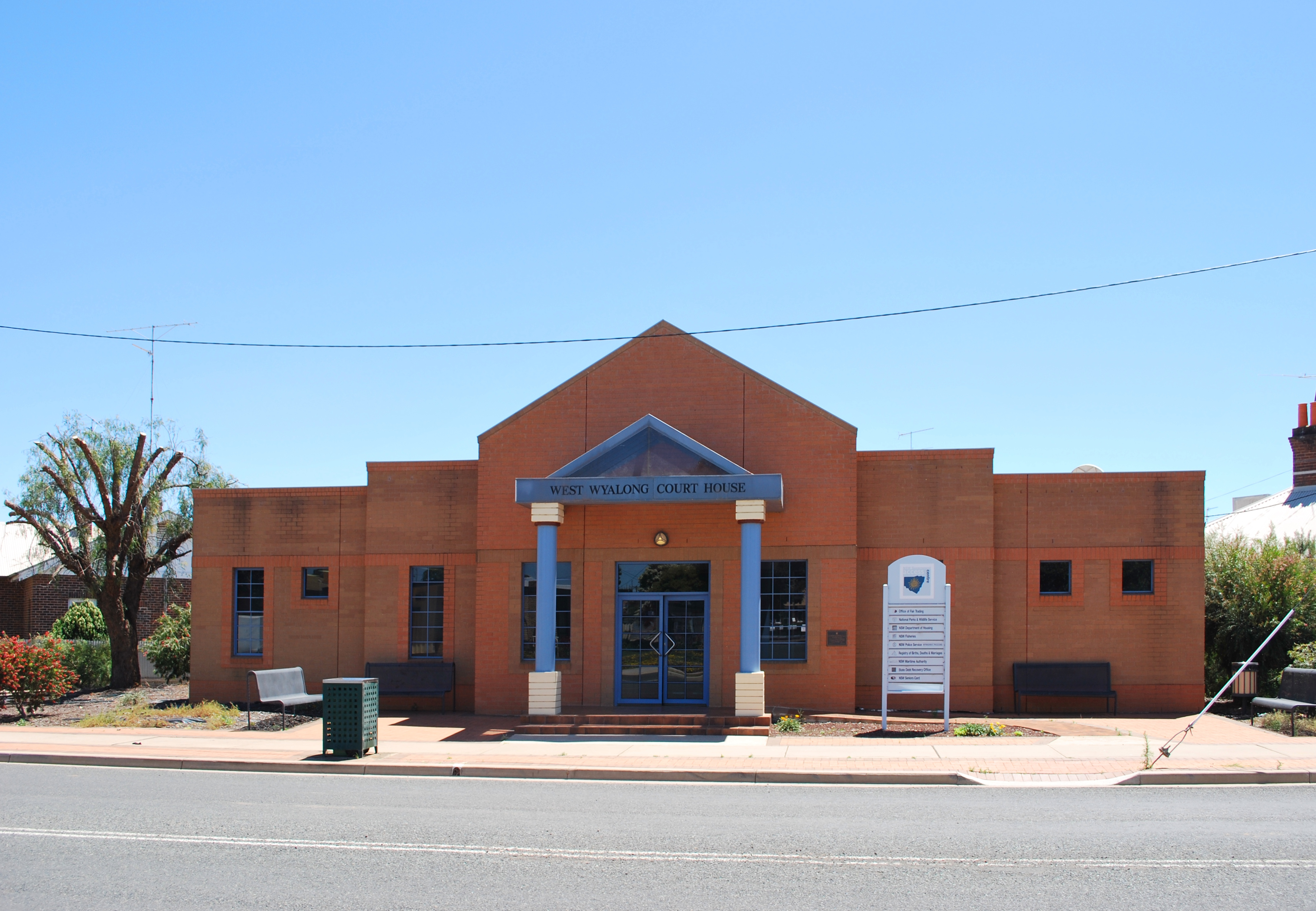
Court House

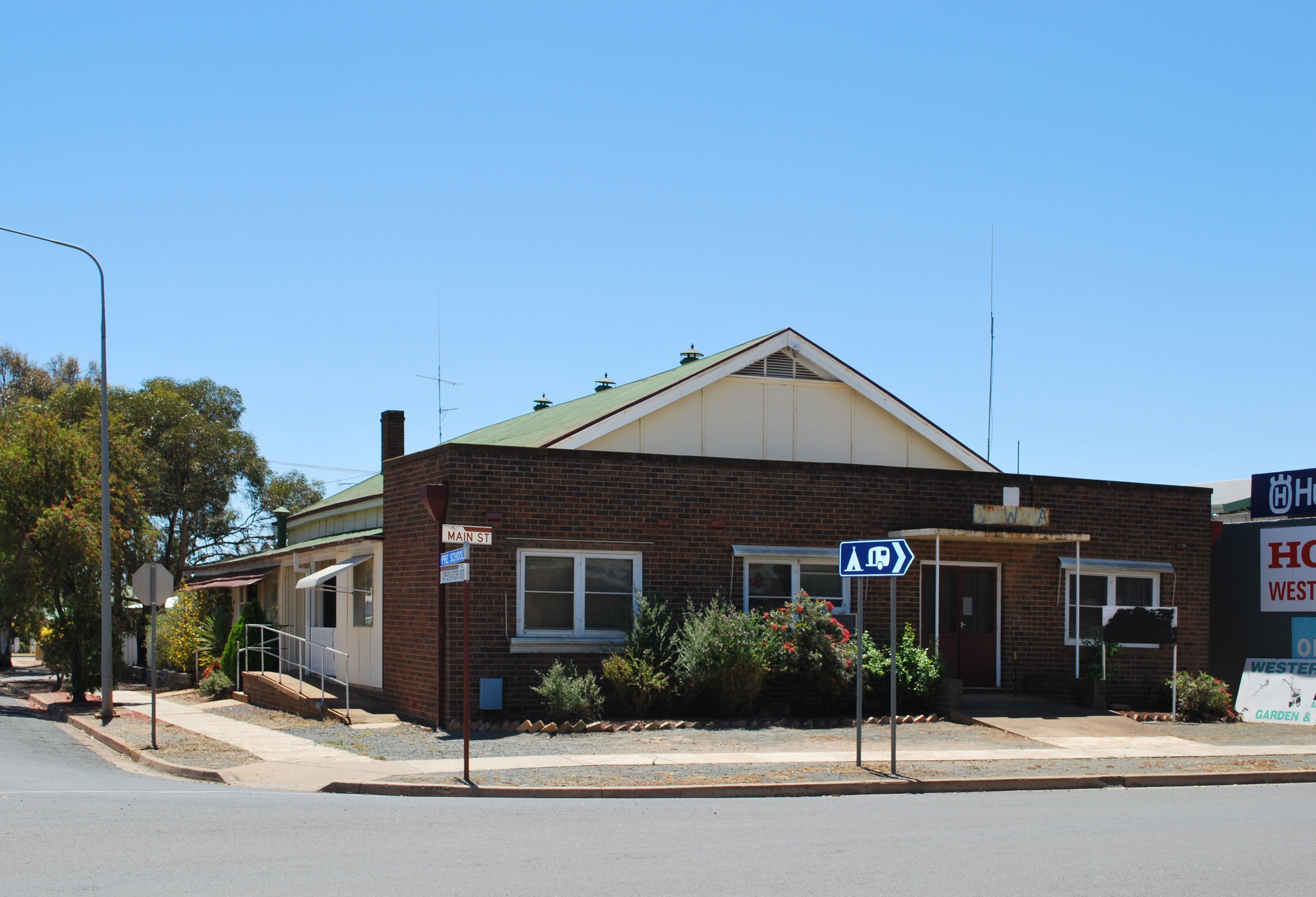
CWA Hall

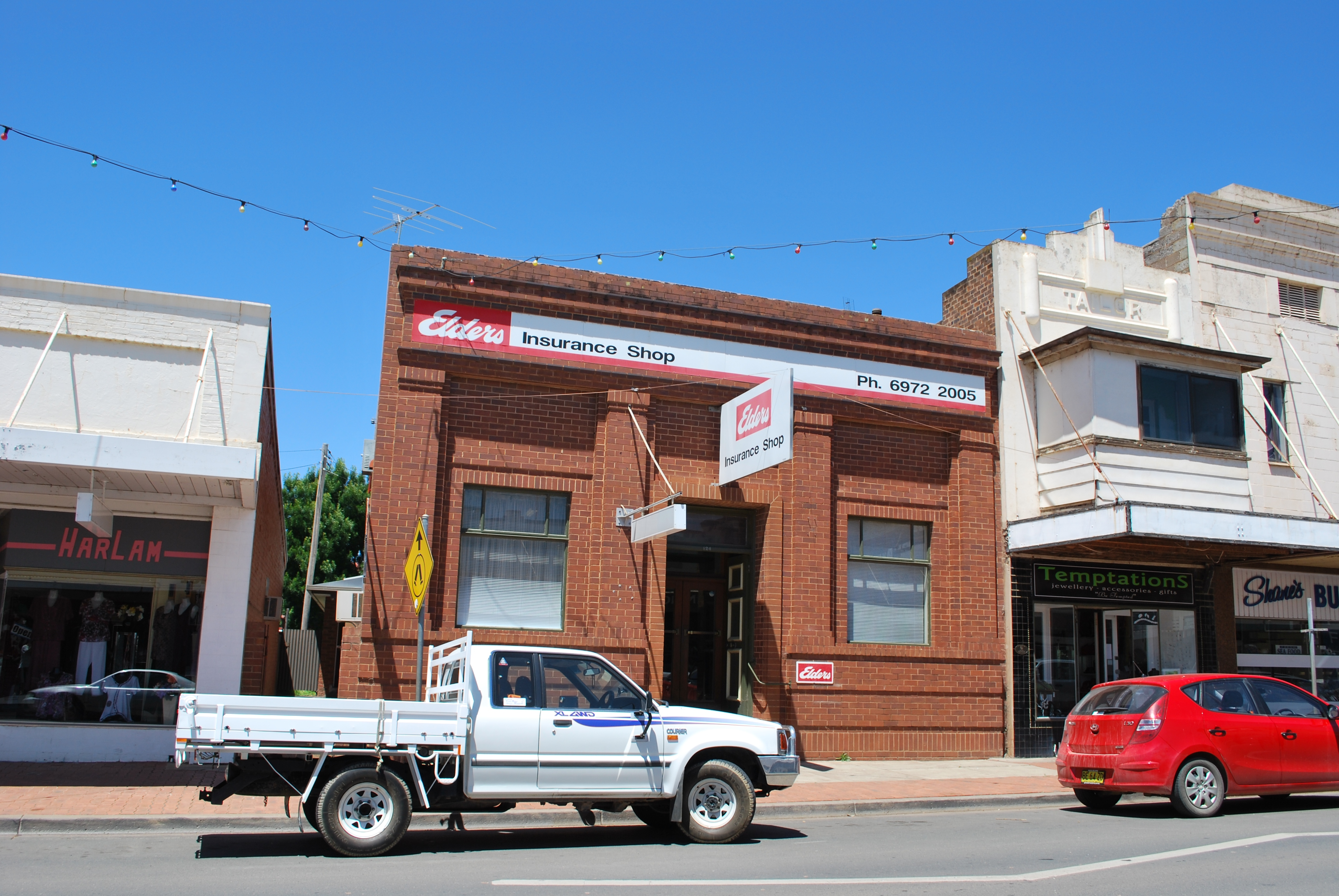
Elders Office

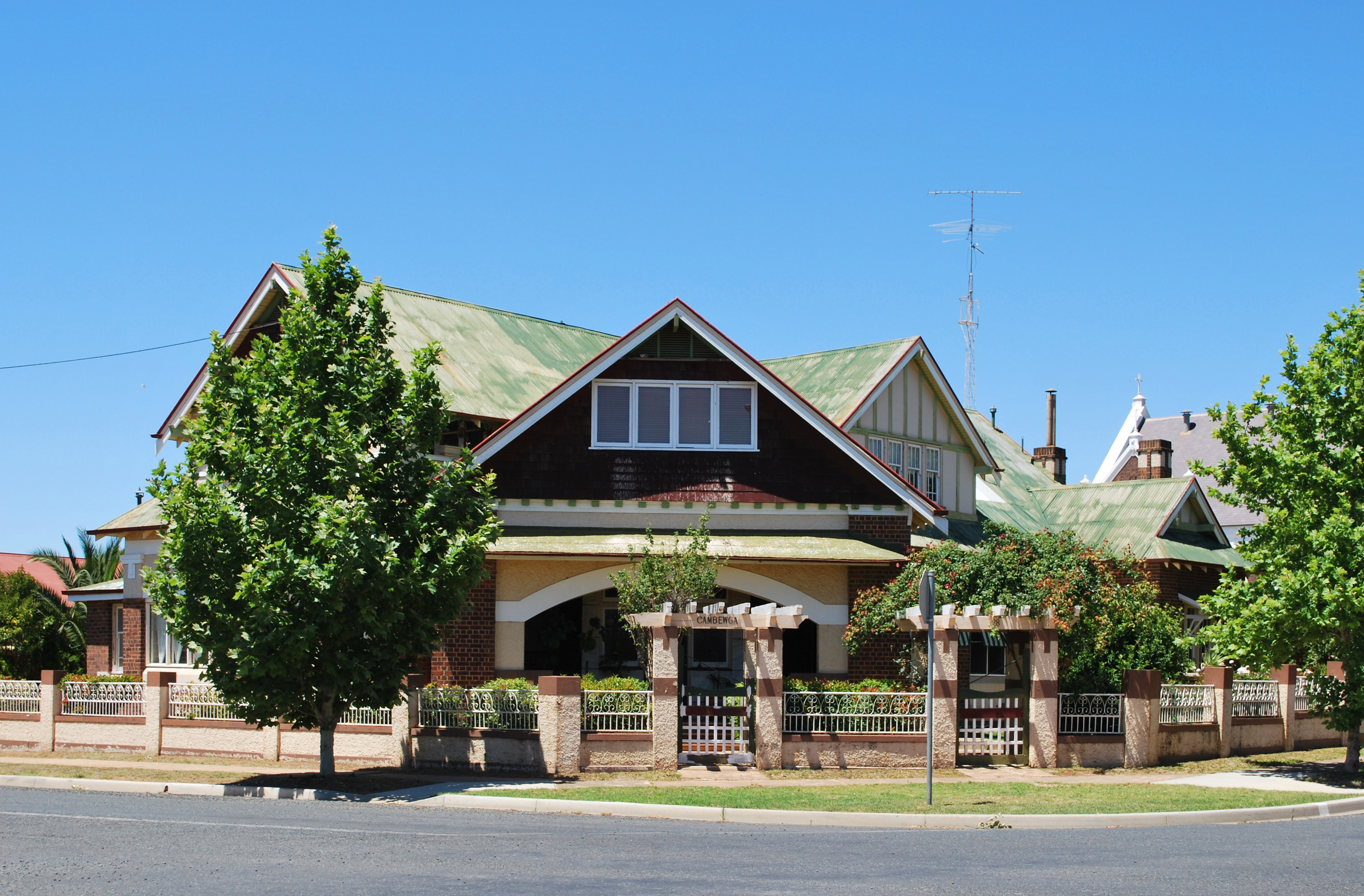
West Wyalong Federation House

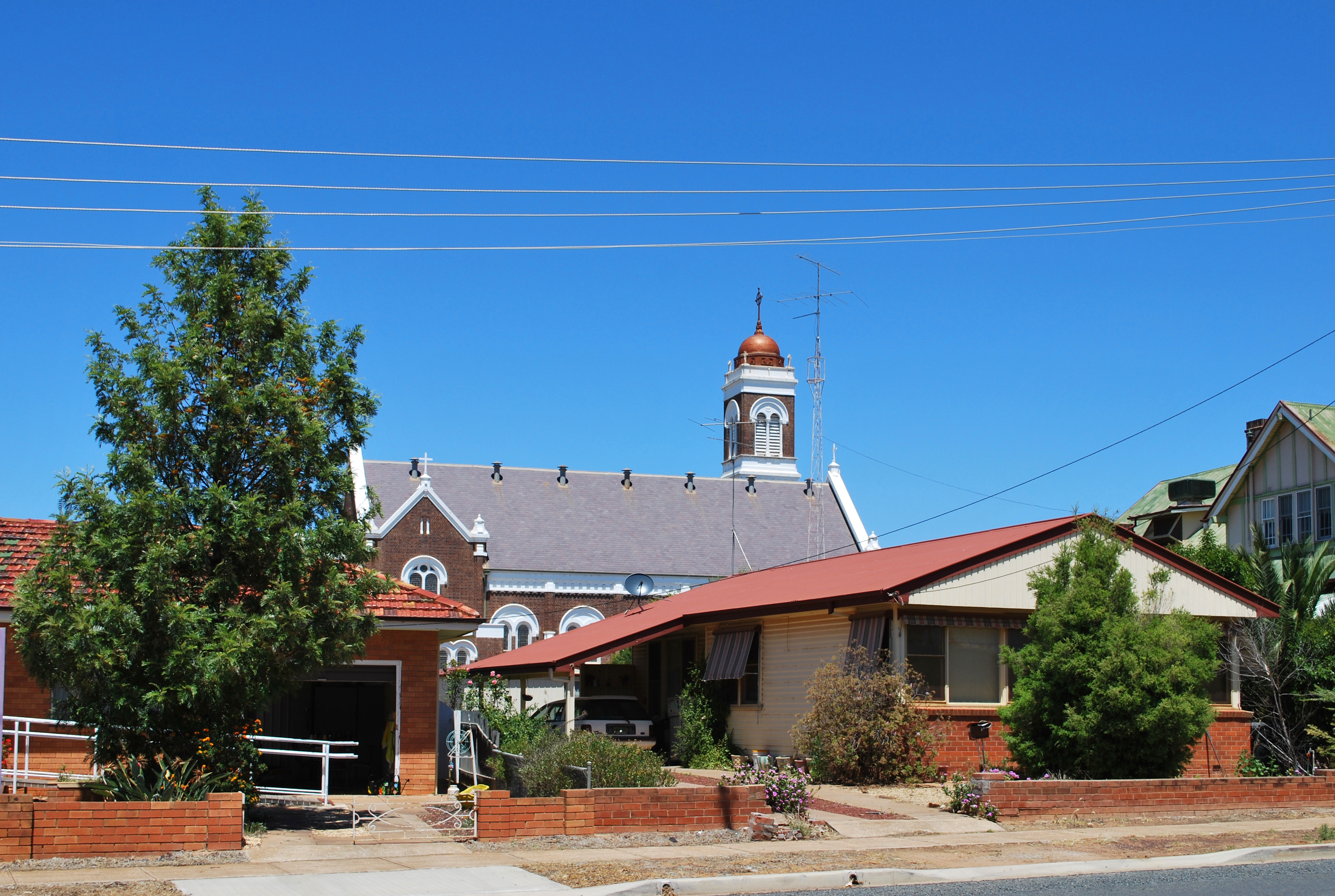
Houses & Church

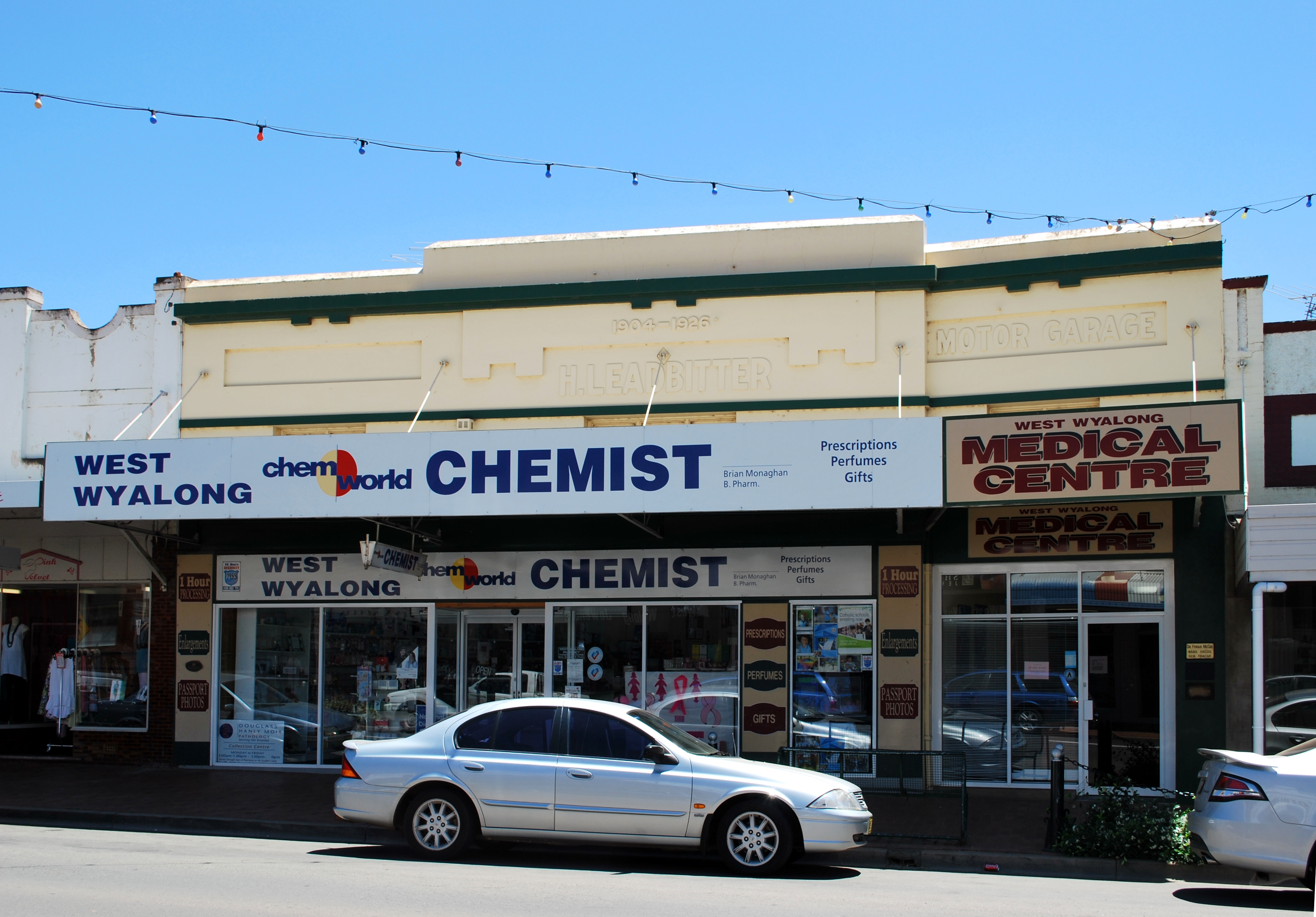
Leadbetter Motor Garage

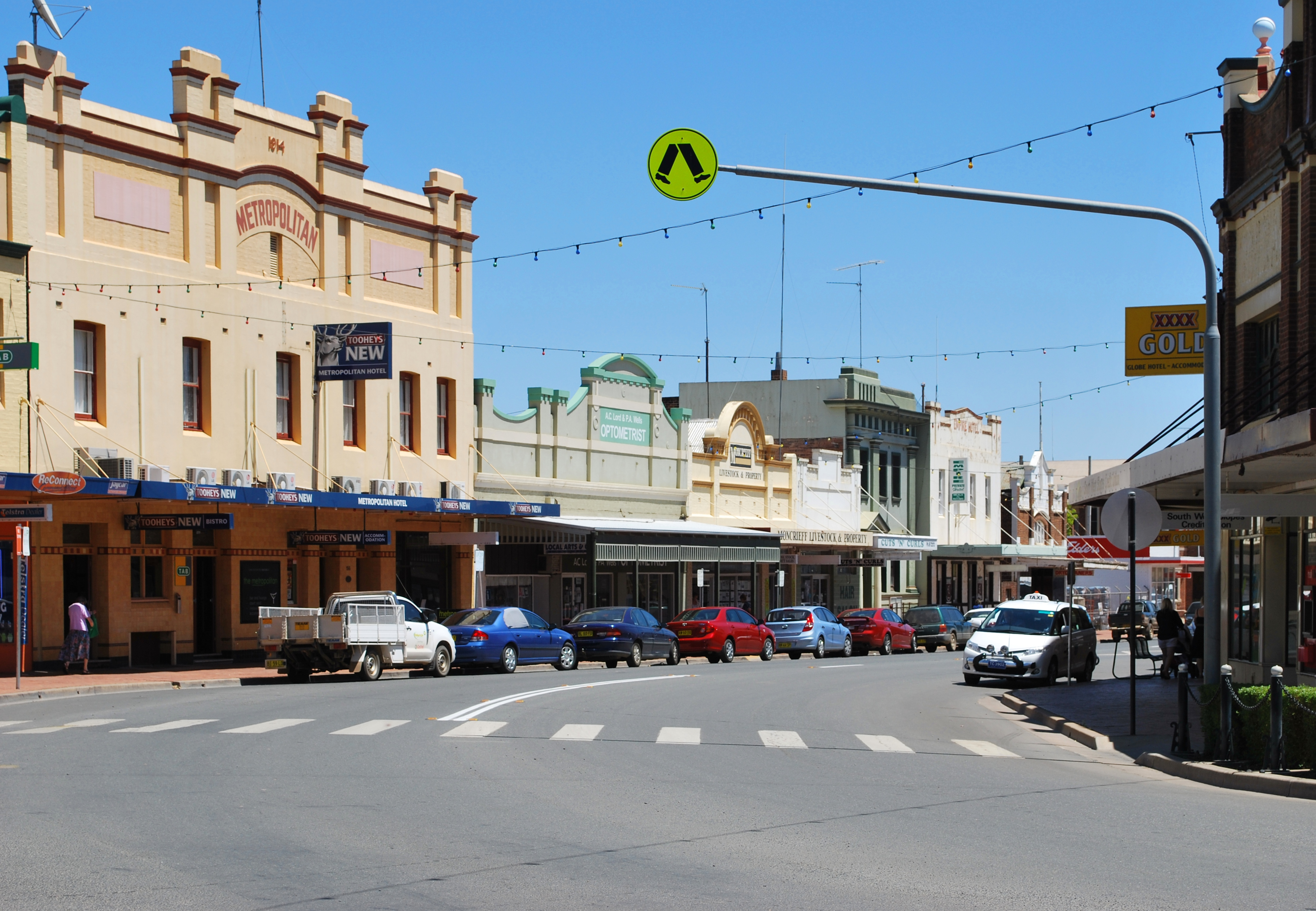
Main Street

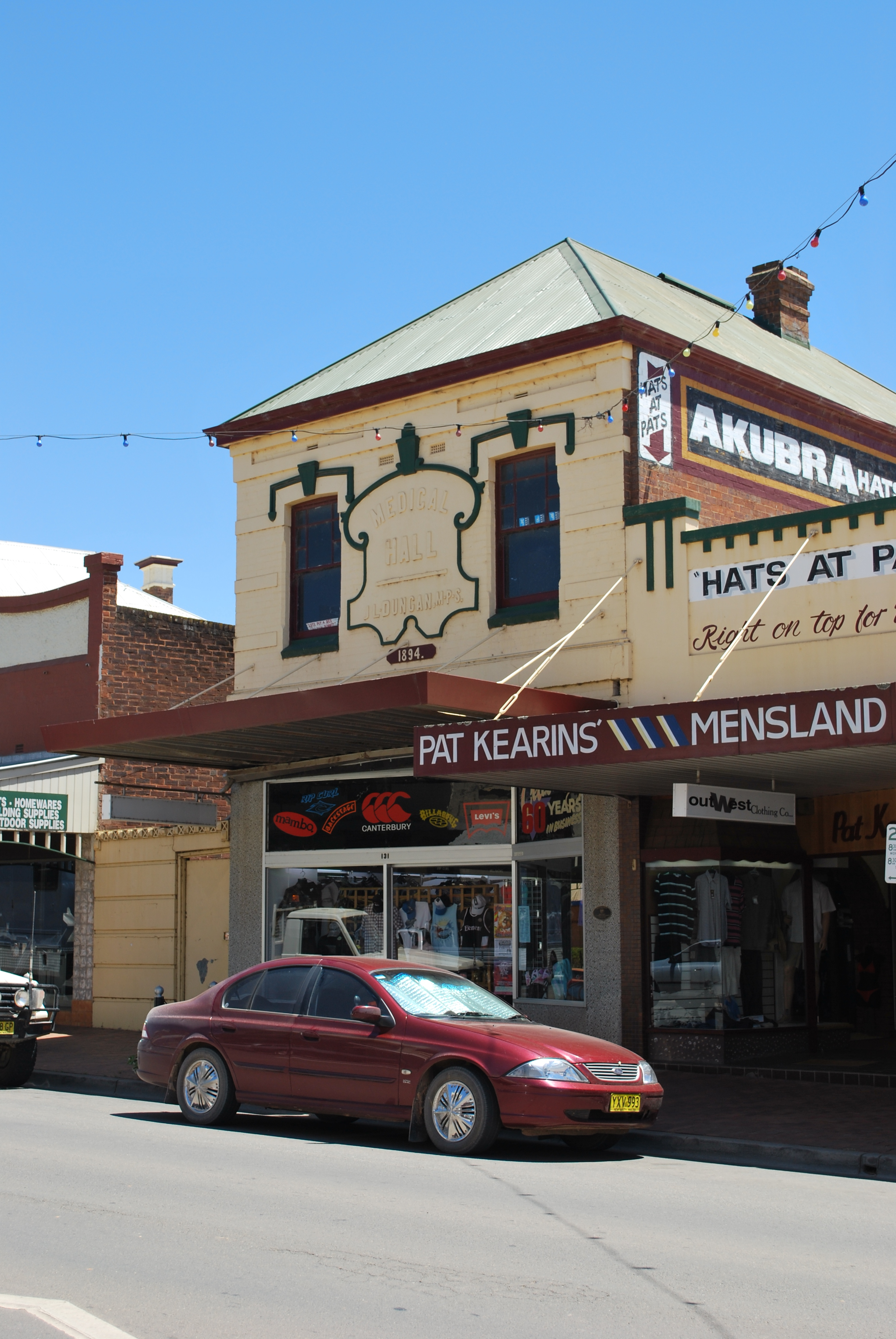
Medical Hall

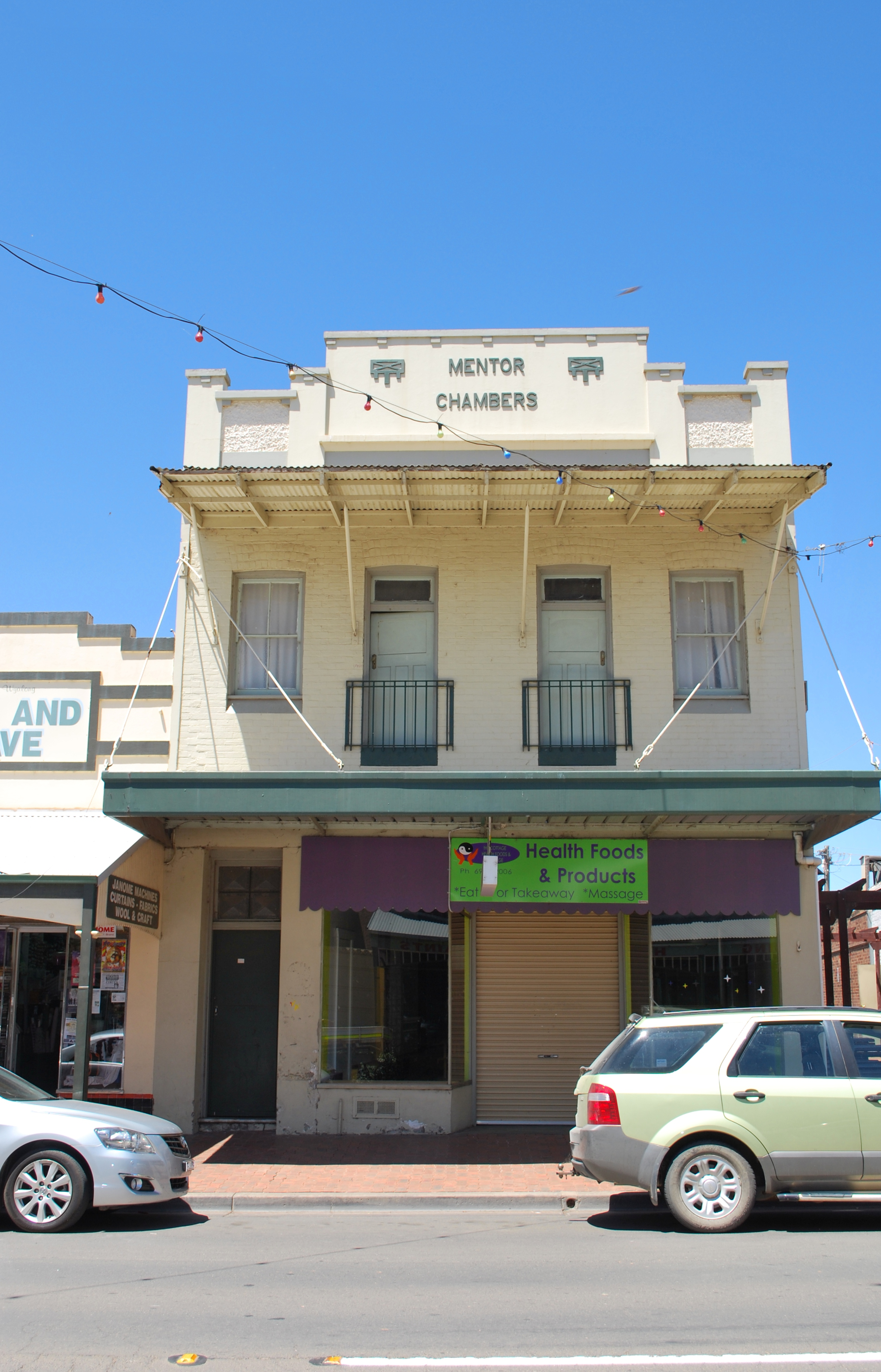
Mentor Chambers

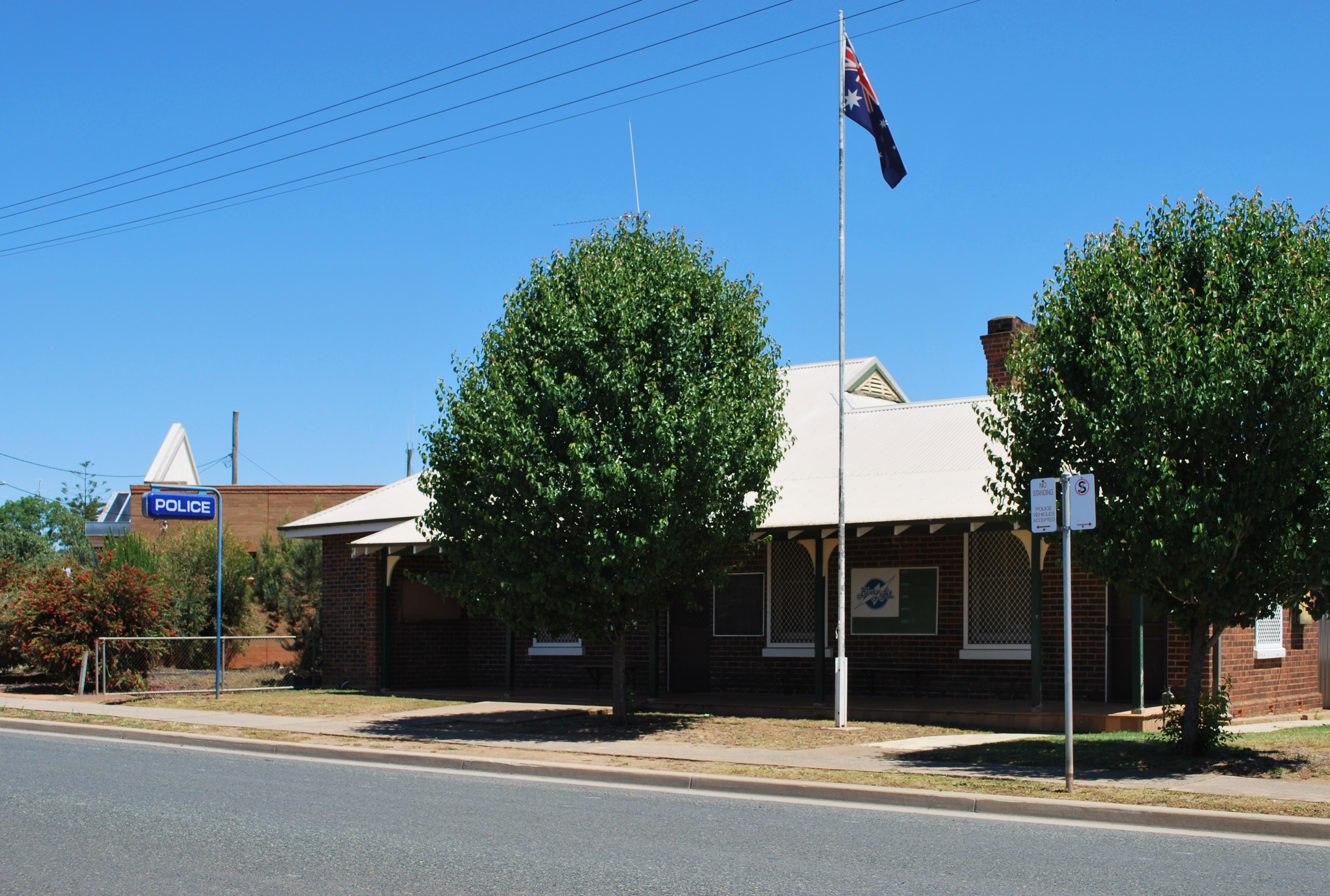
West Wyalong Police Station

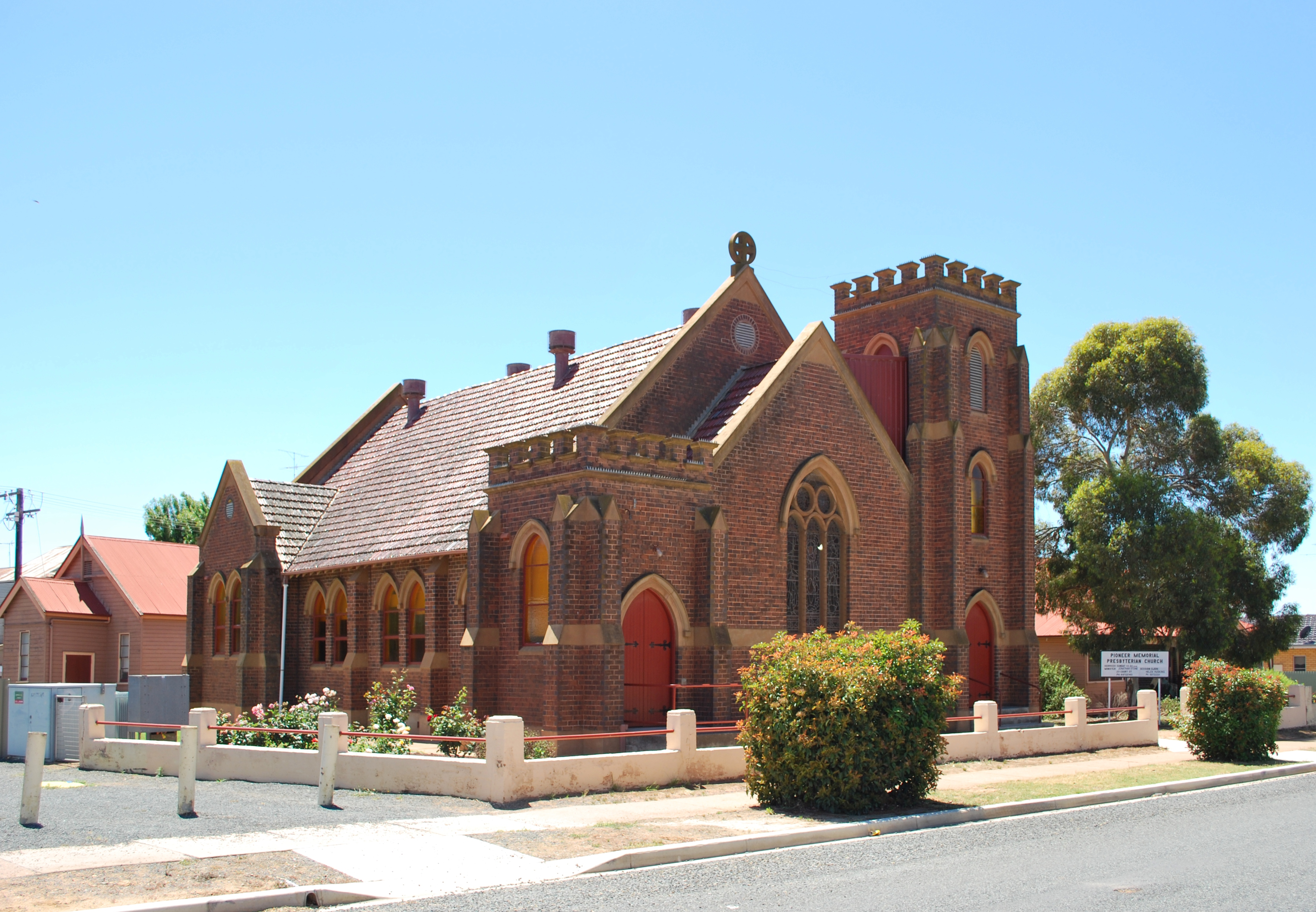
West Wyalong Presbyterian Church

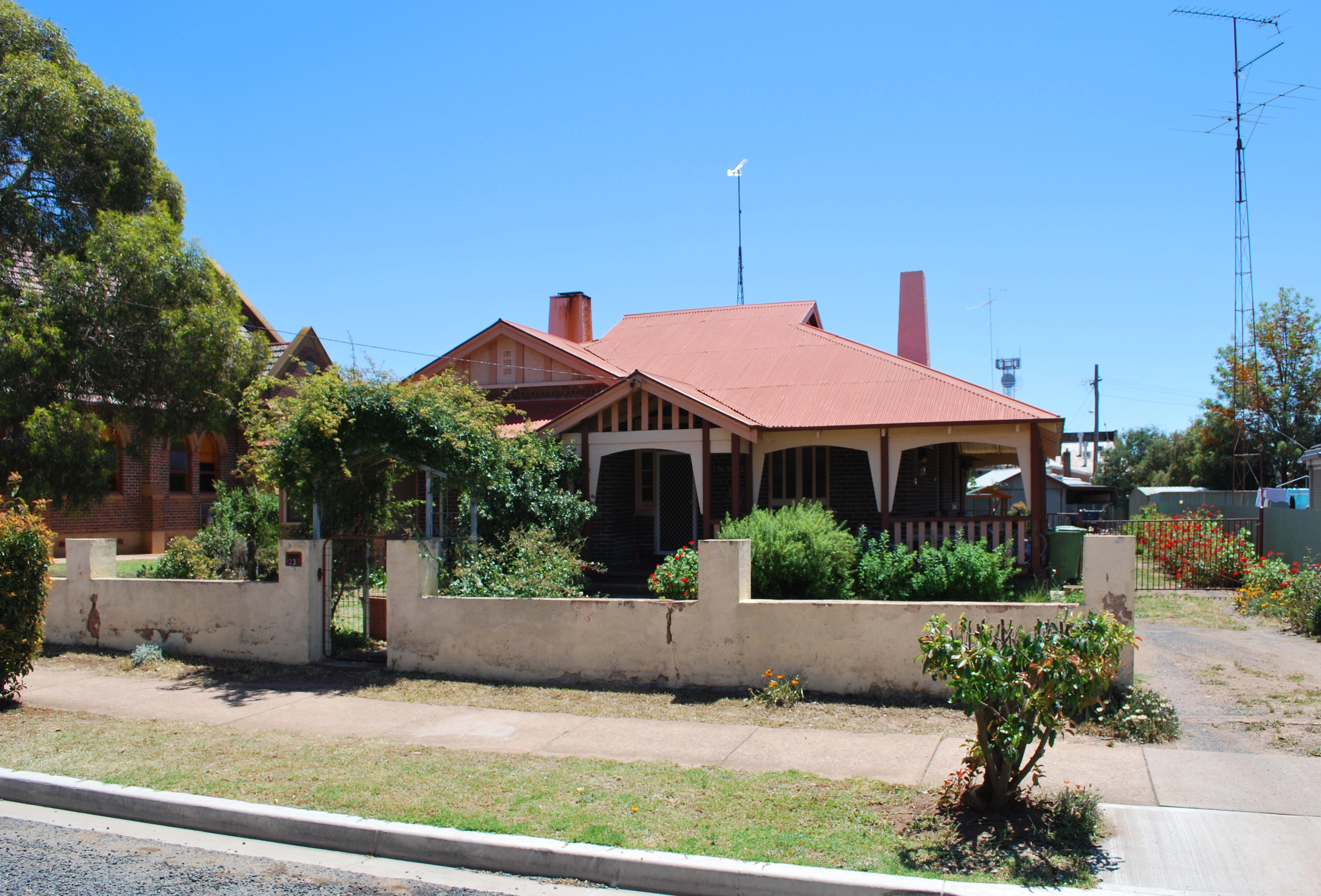
West Wyalong Presbyterian Manse

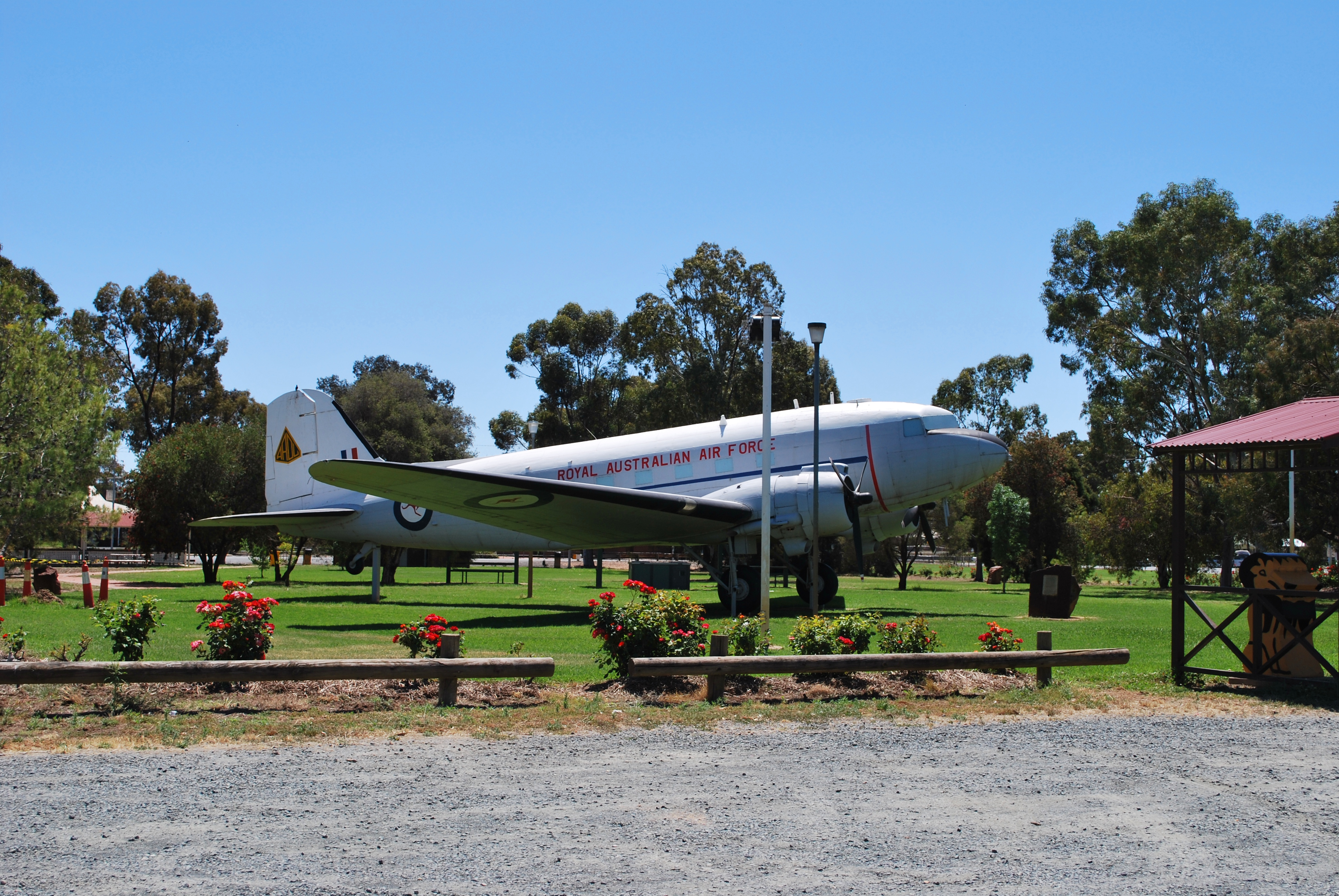
RAAF Plane

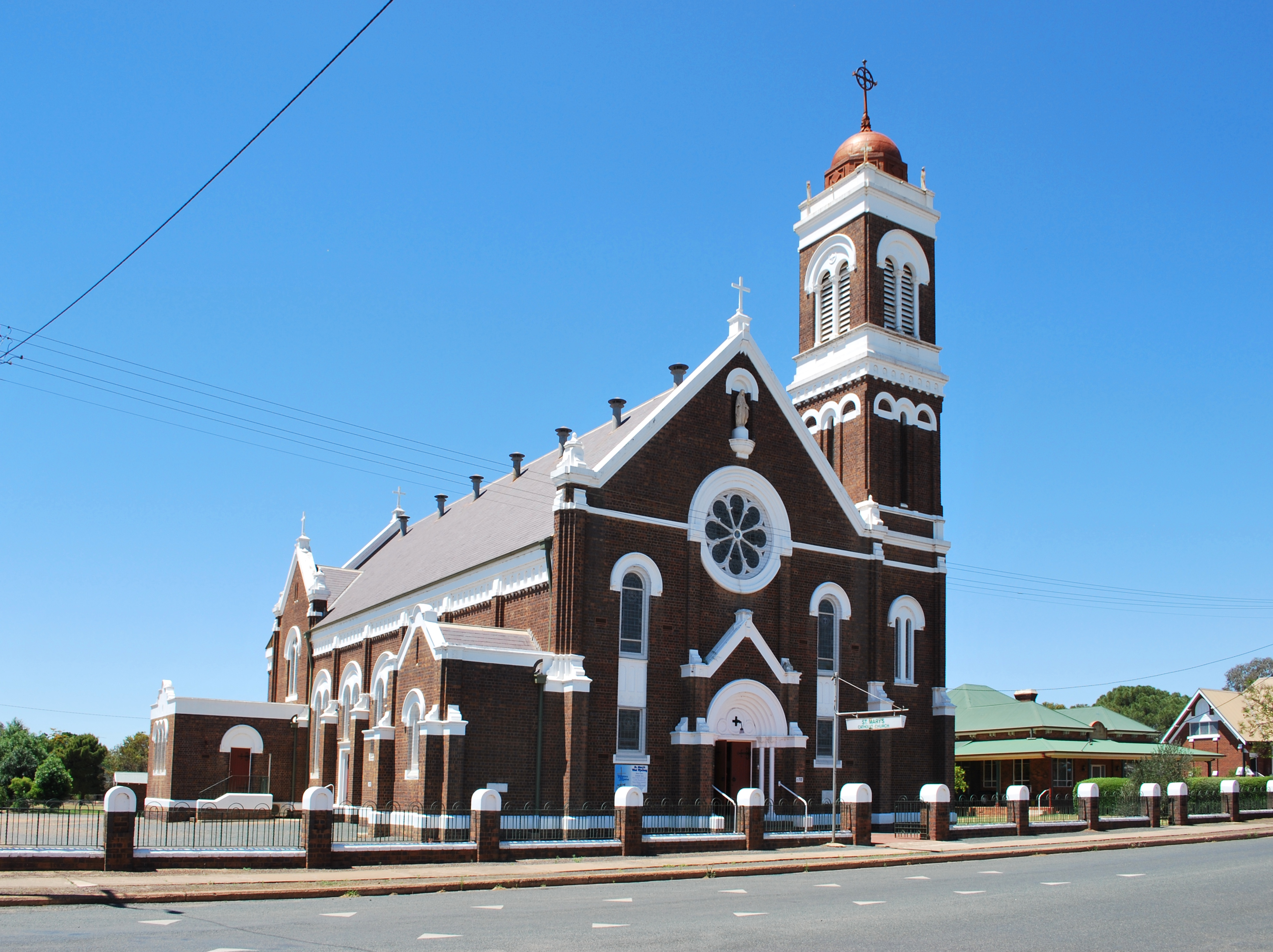
West Wyalong Roman Catholic Church

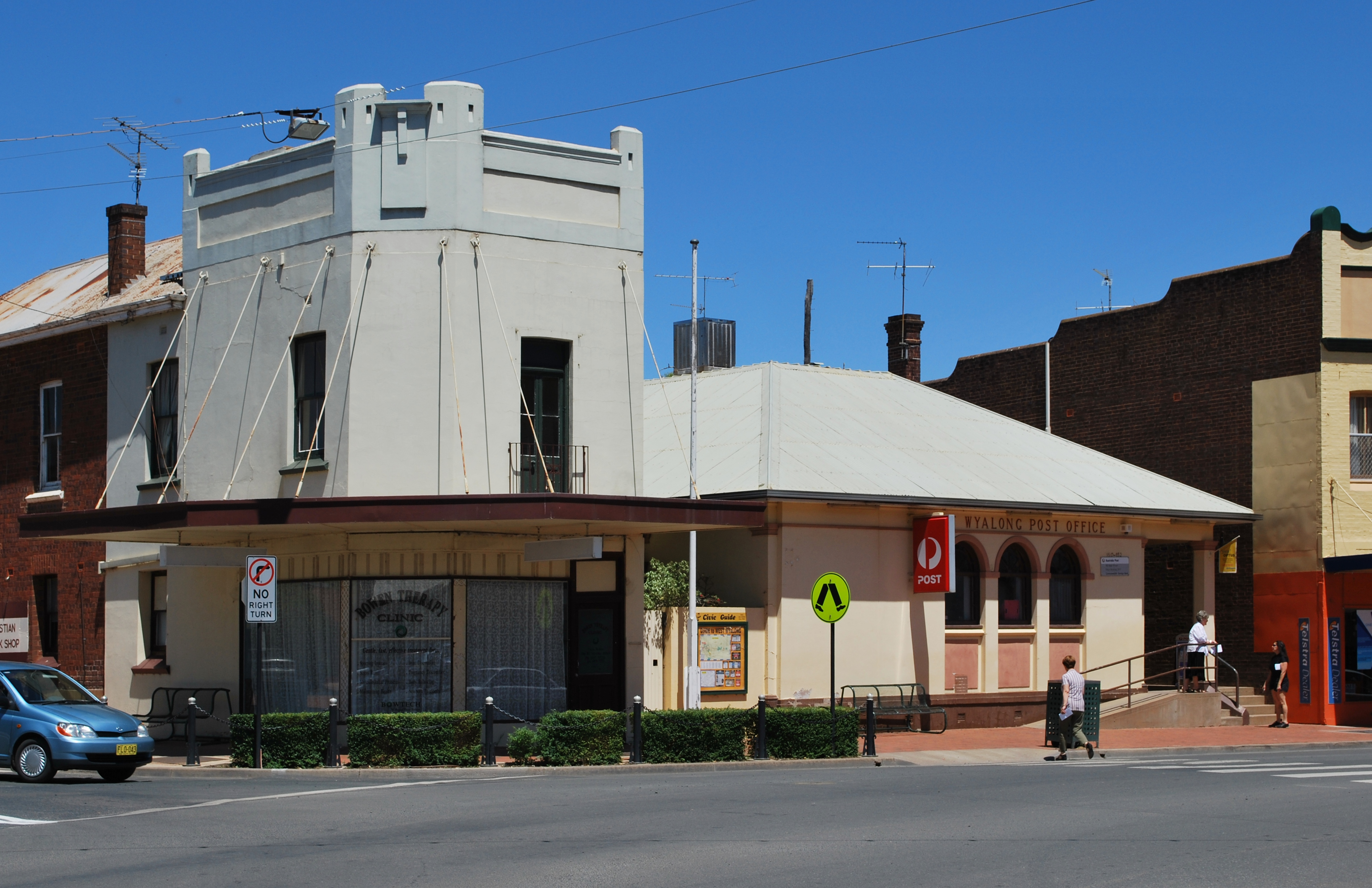
West Wyalong Post Office

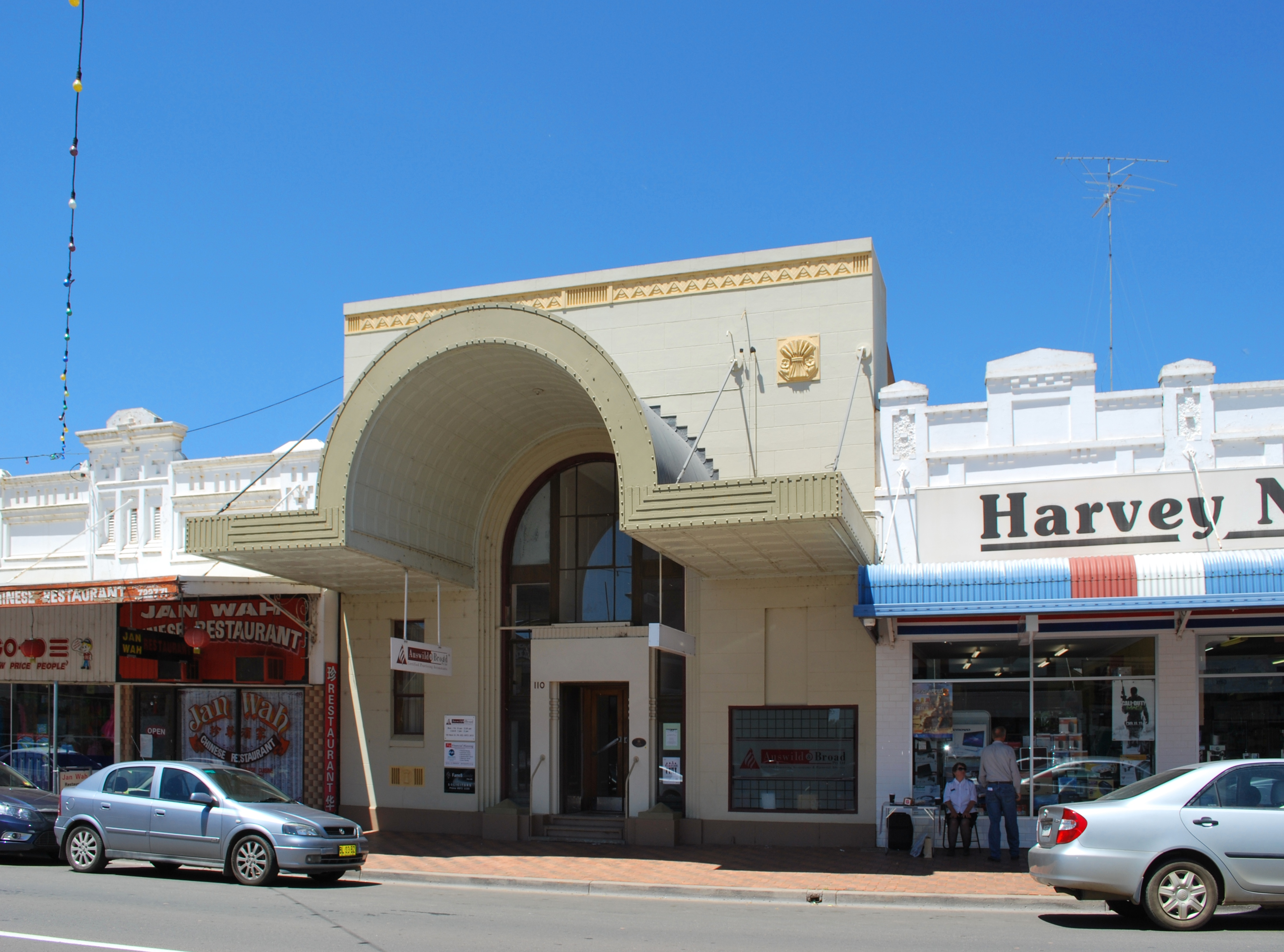
West Wyalong Rural Bank

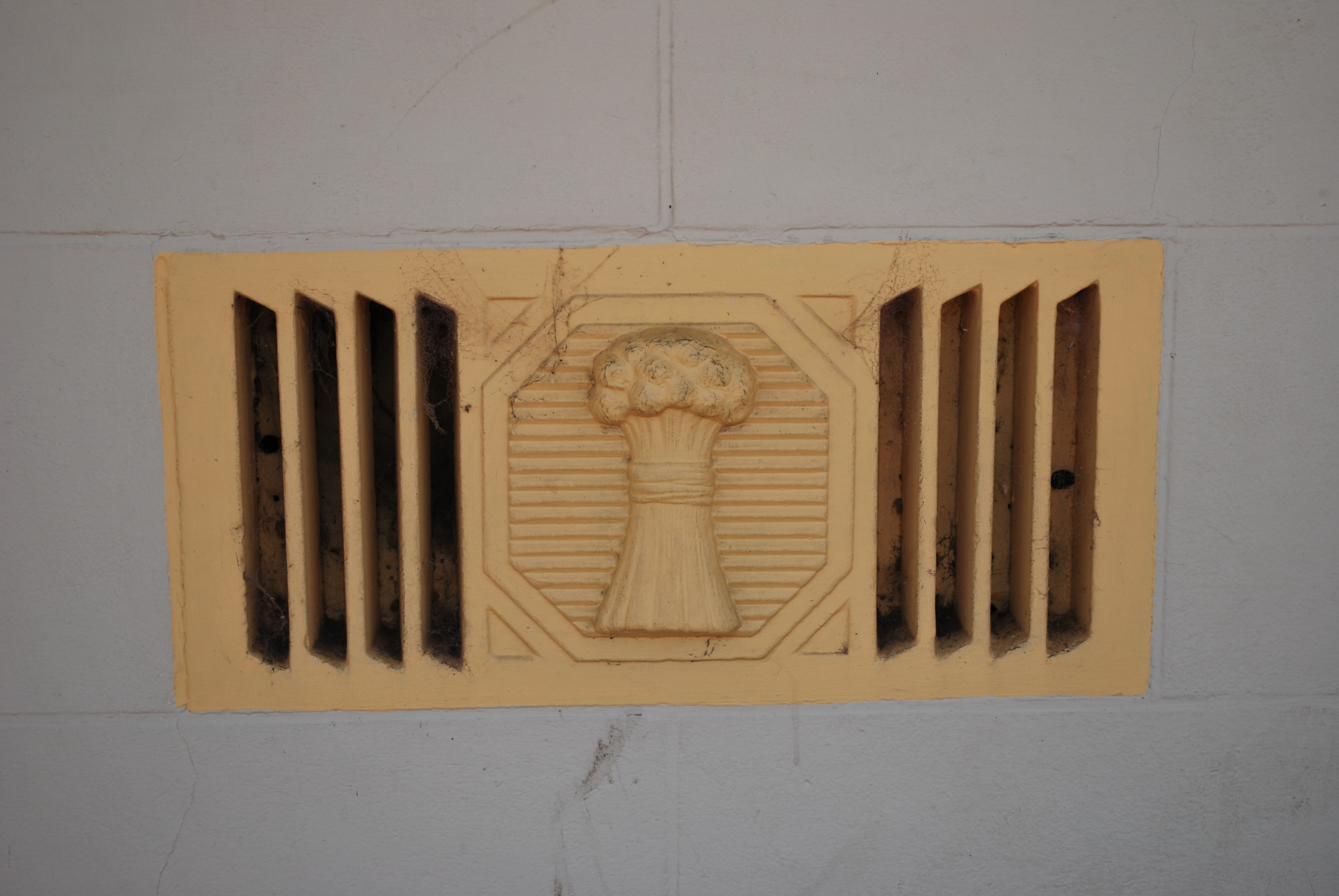
West Wyalong Rural Bank

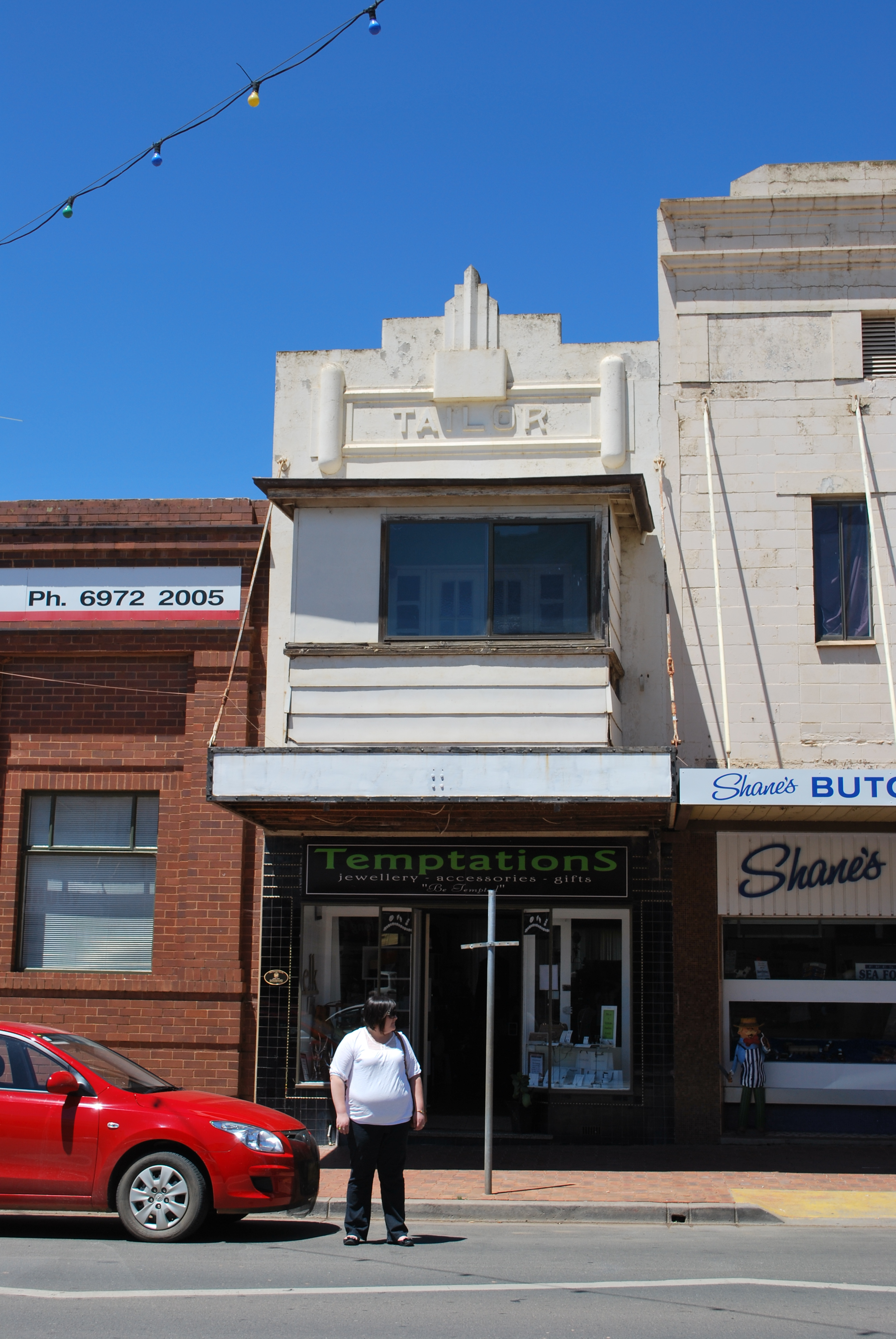
Main Street

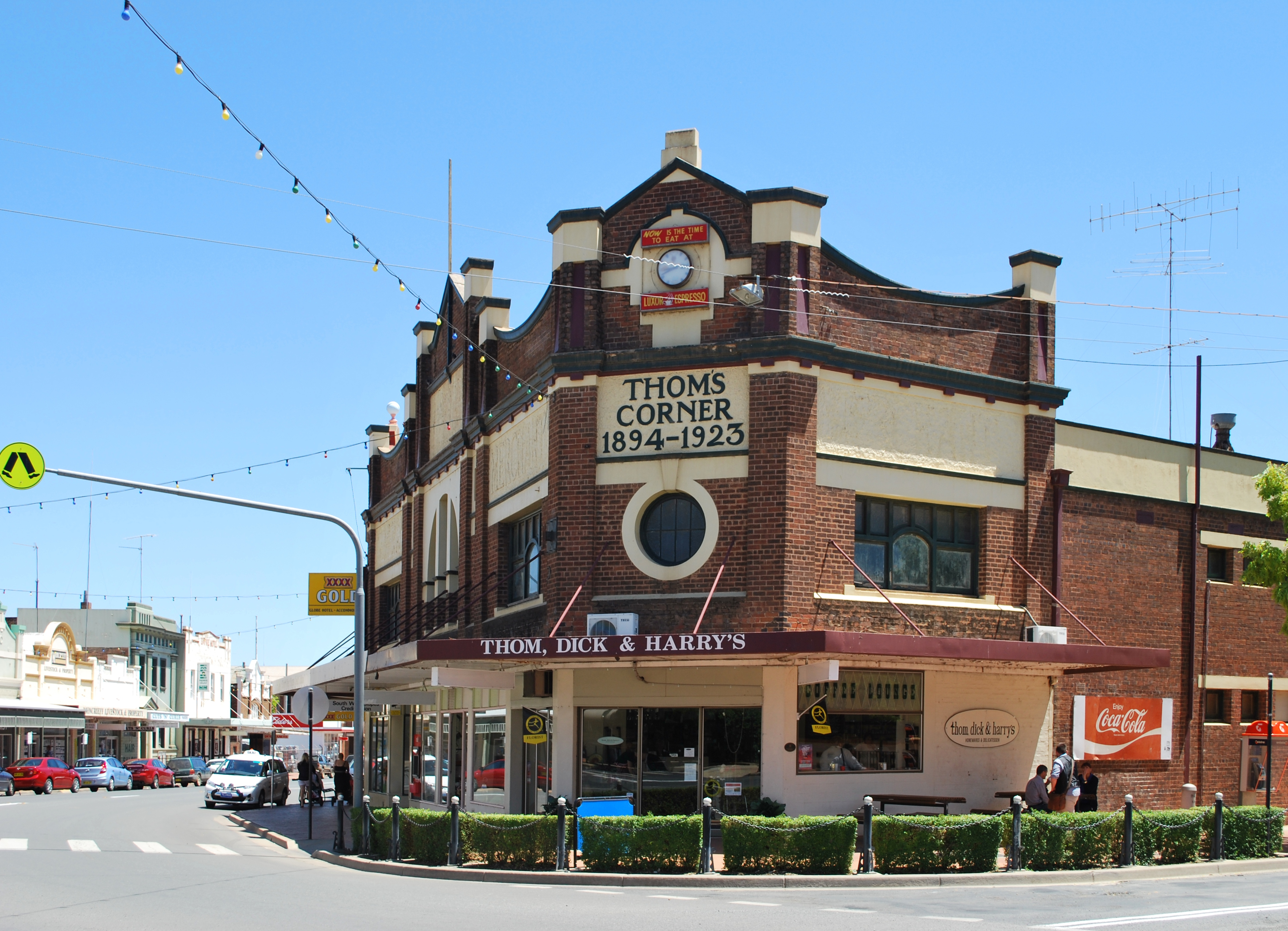
Thom's Corner

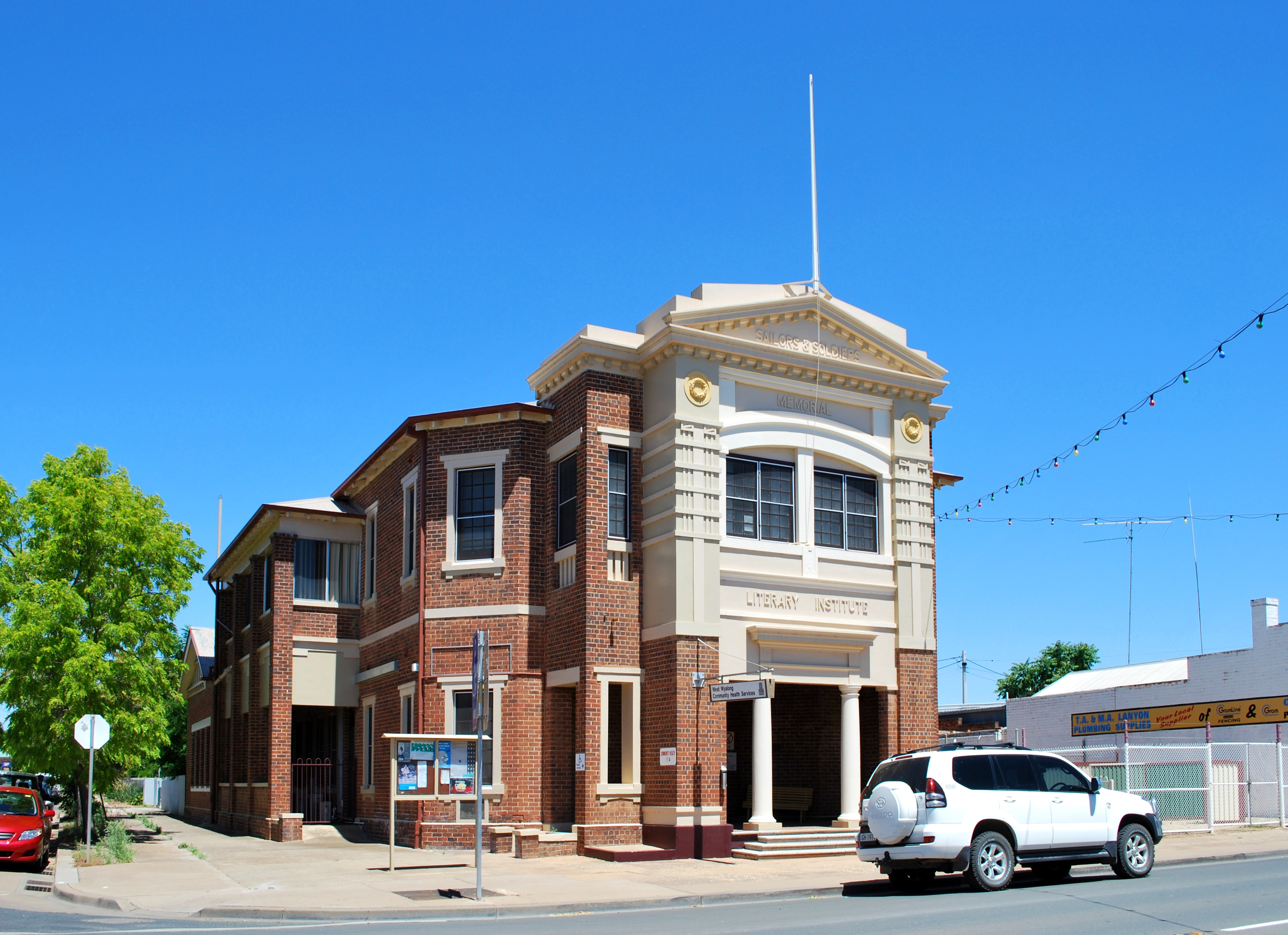
Memorial Literary Institute

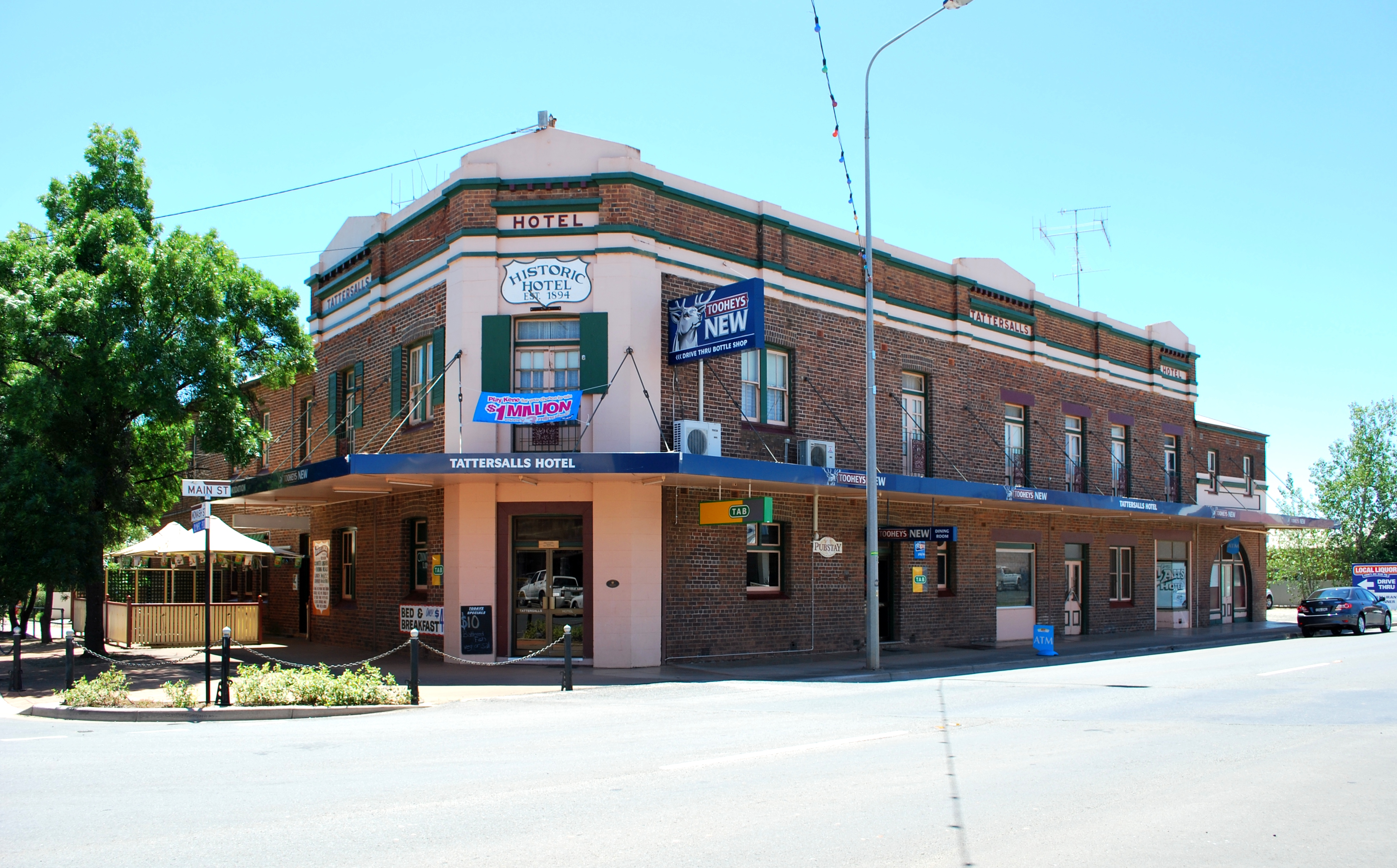
Tattersalls Hotel

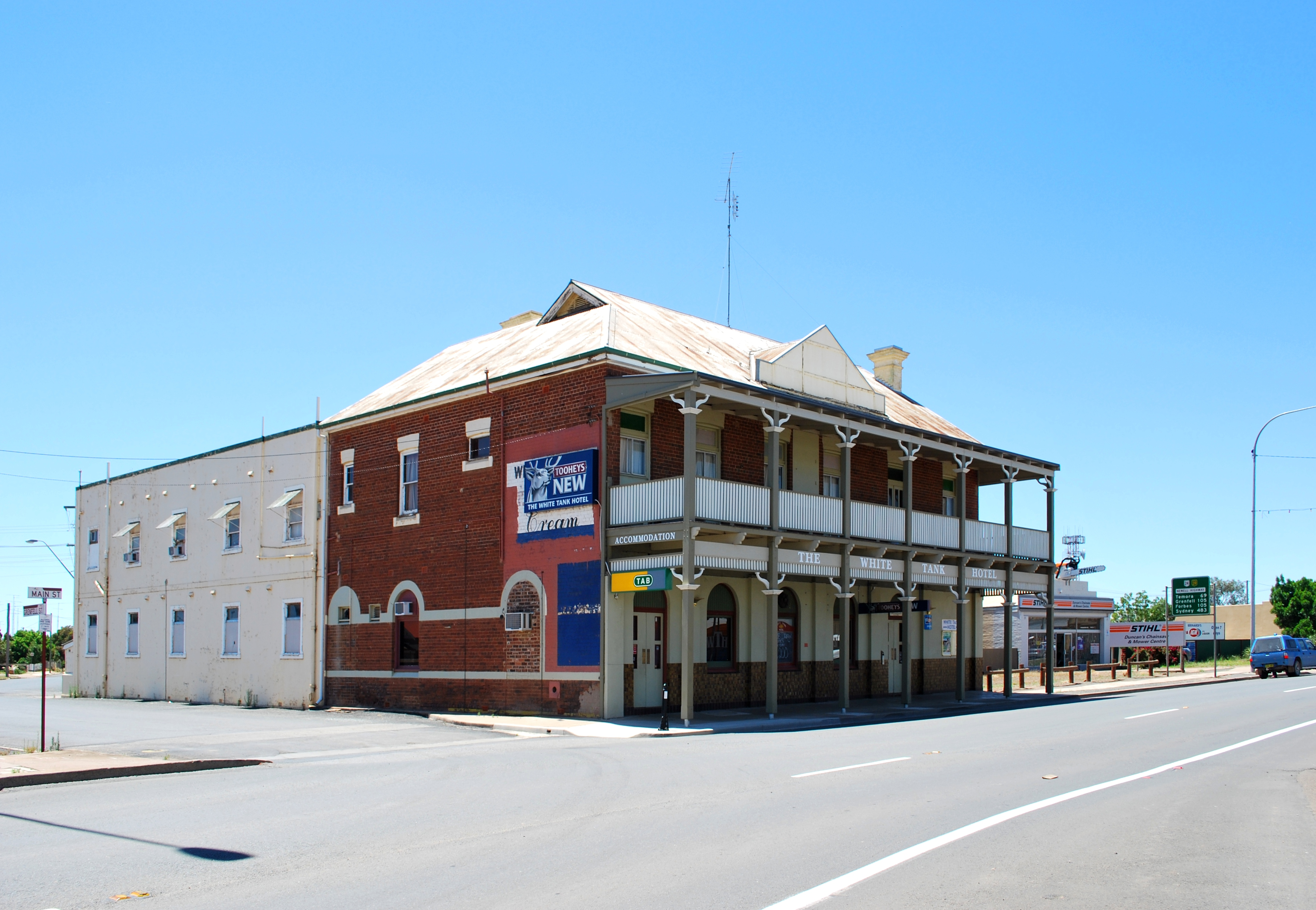
White Tank Hotel

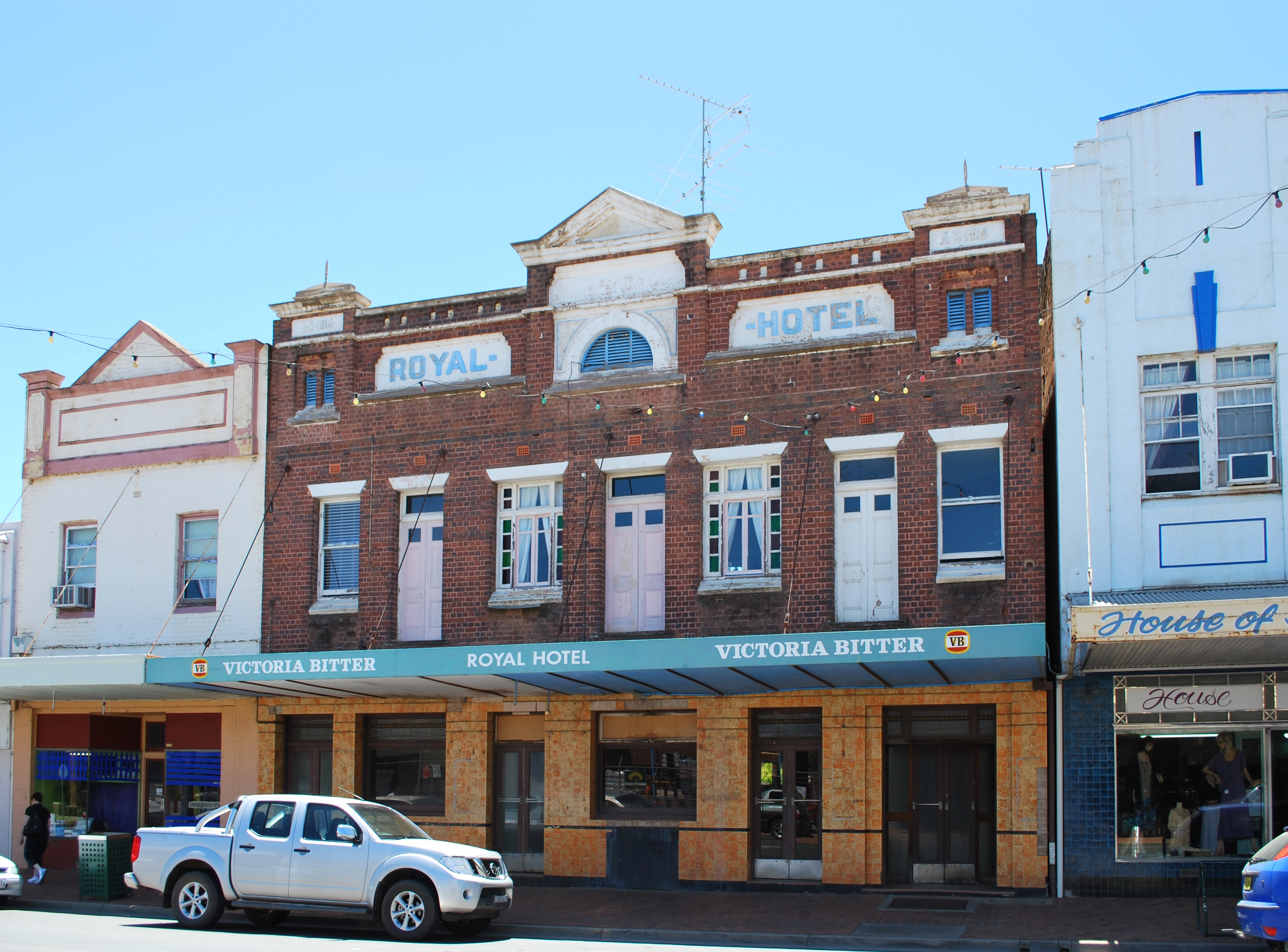
Royal Hotel

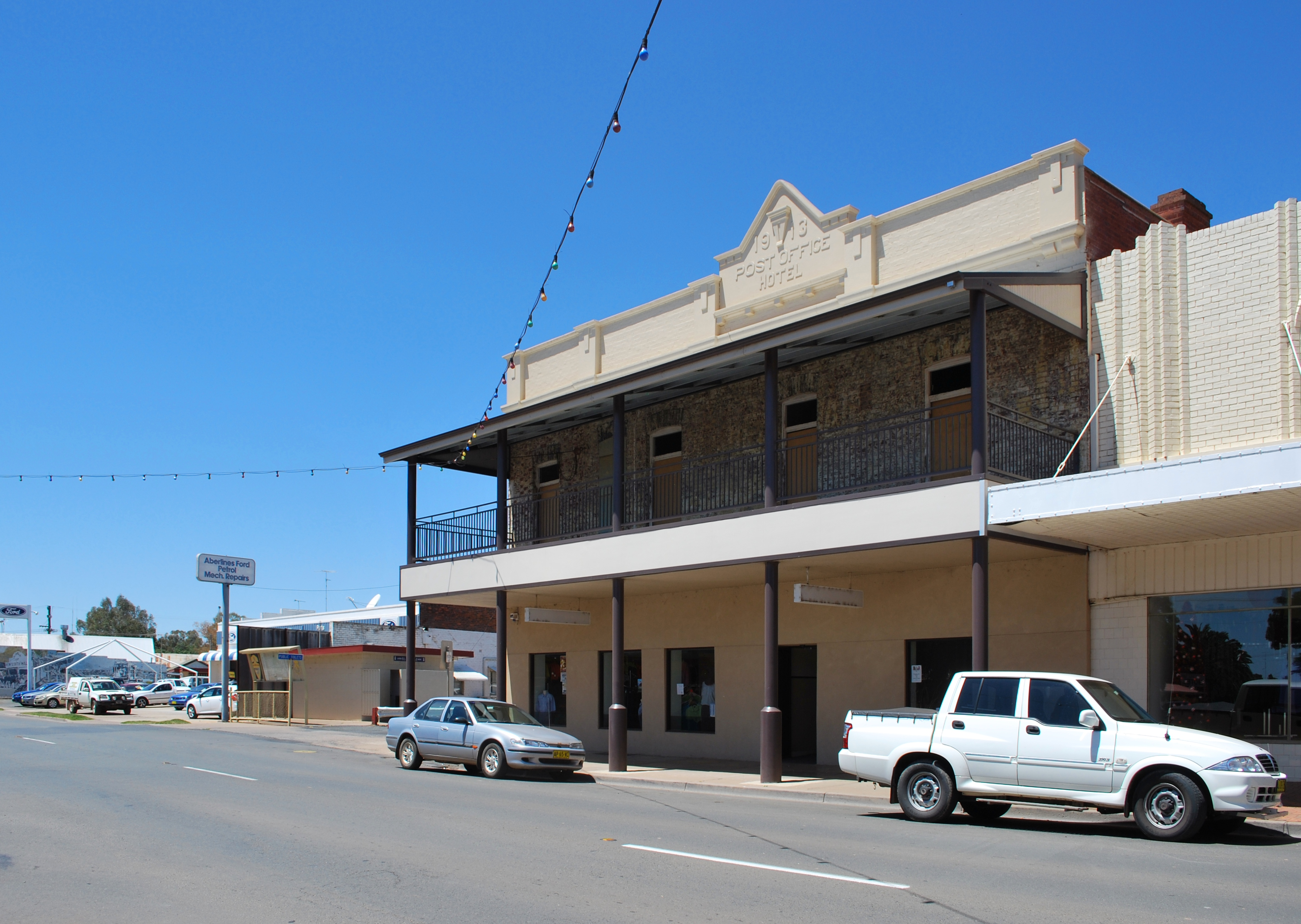
Post Office Hotel

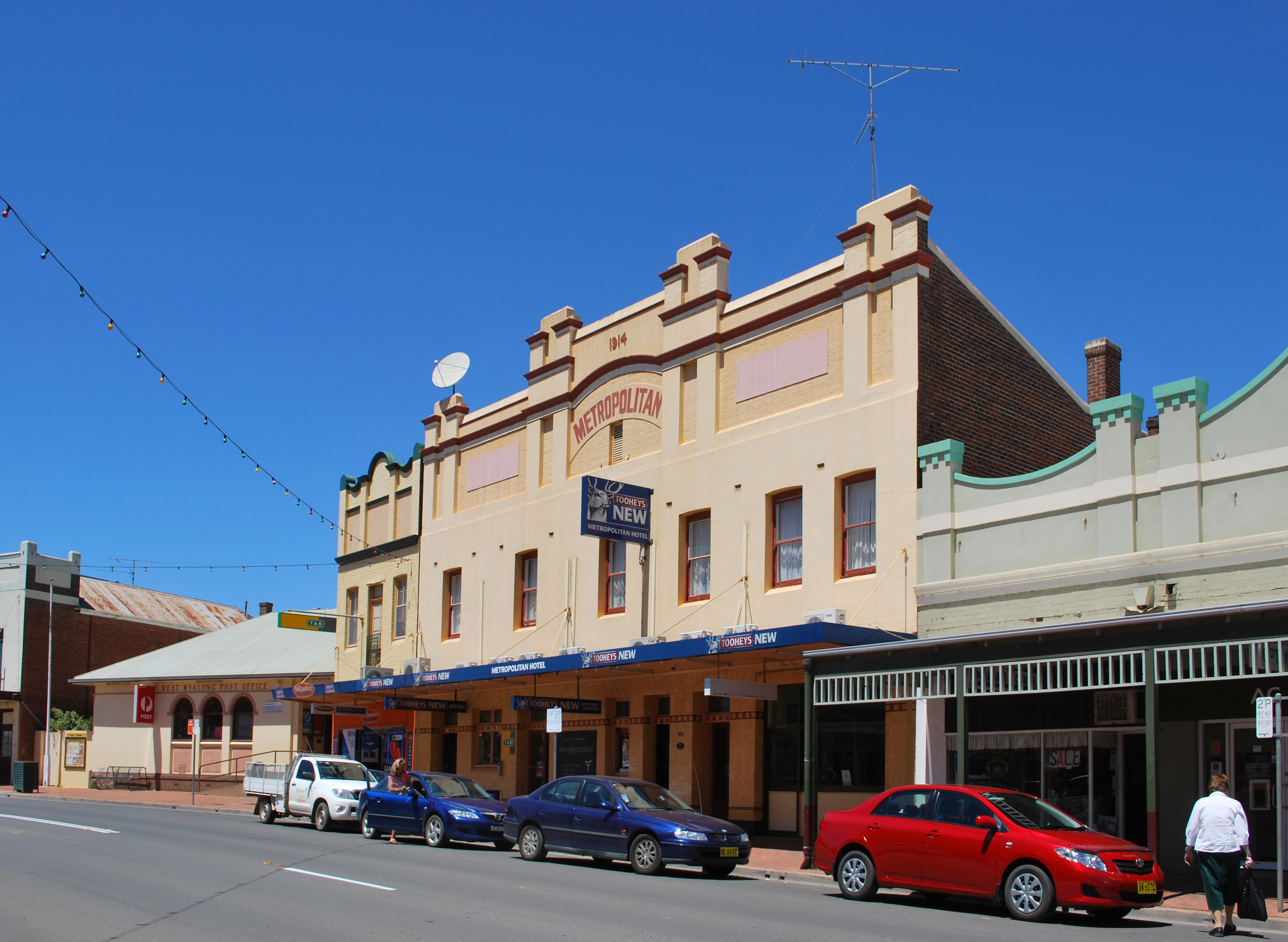
Metropolitan Hotel

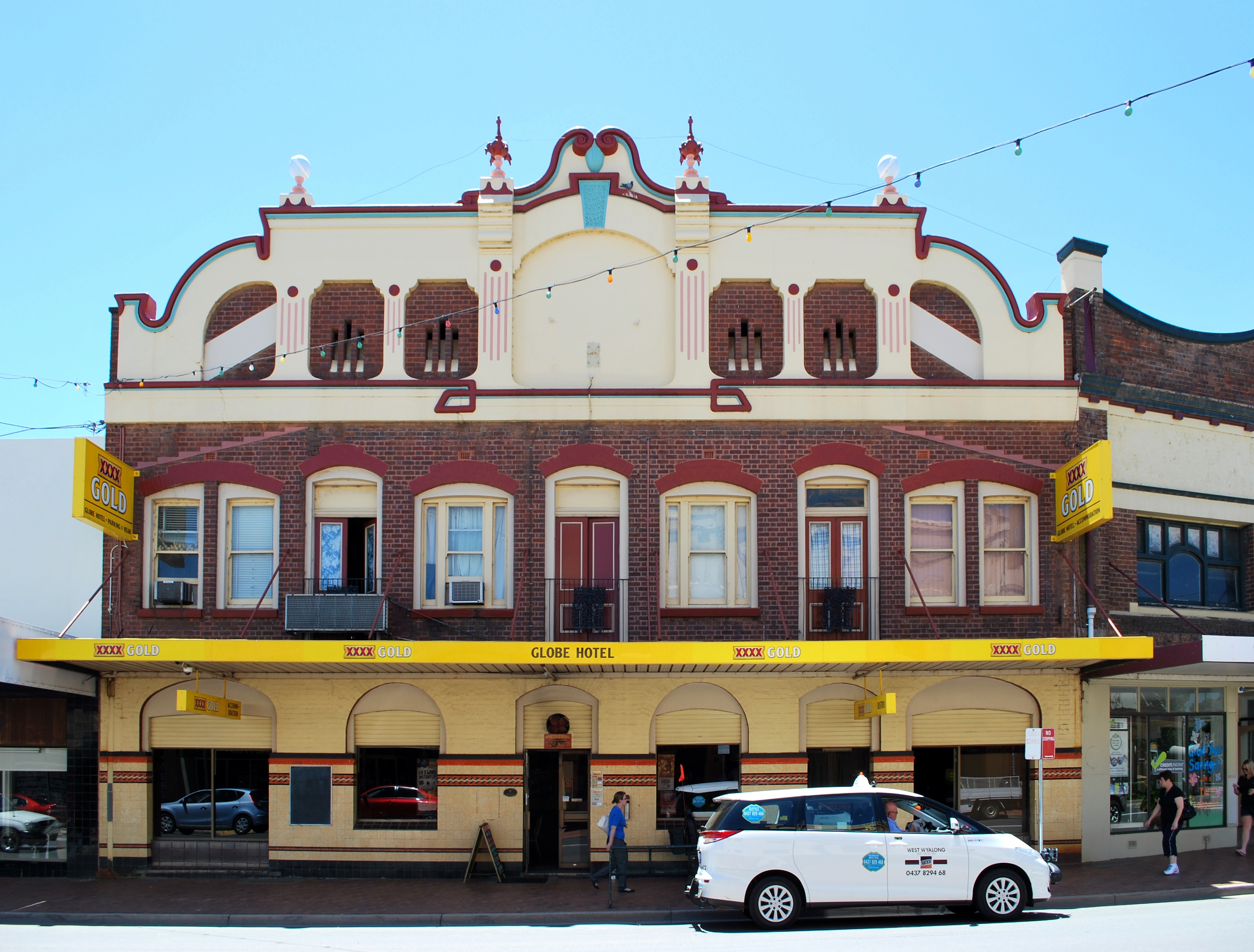
Globe Hotel

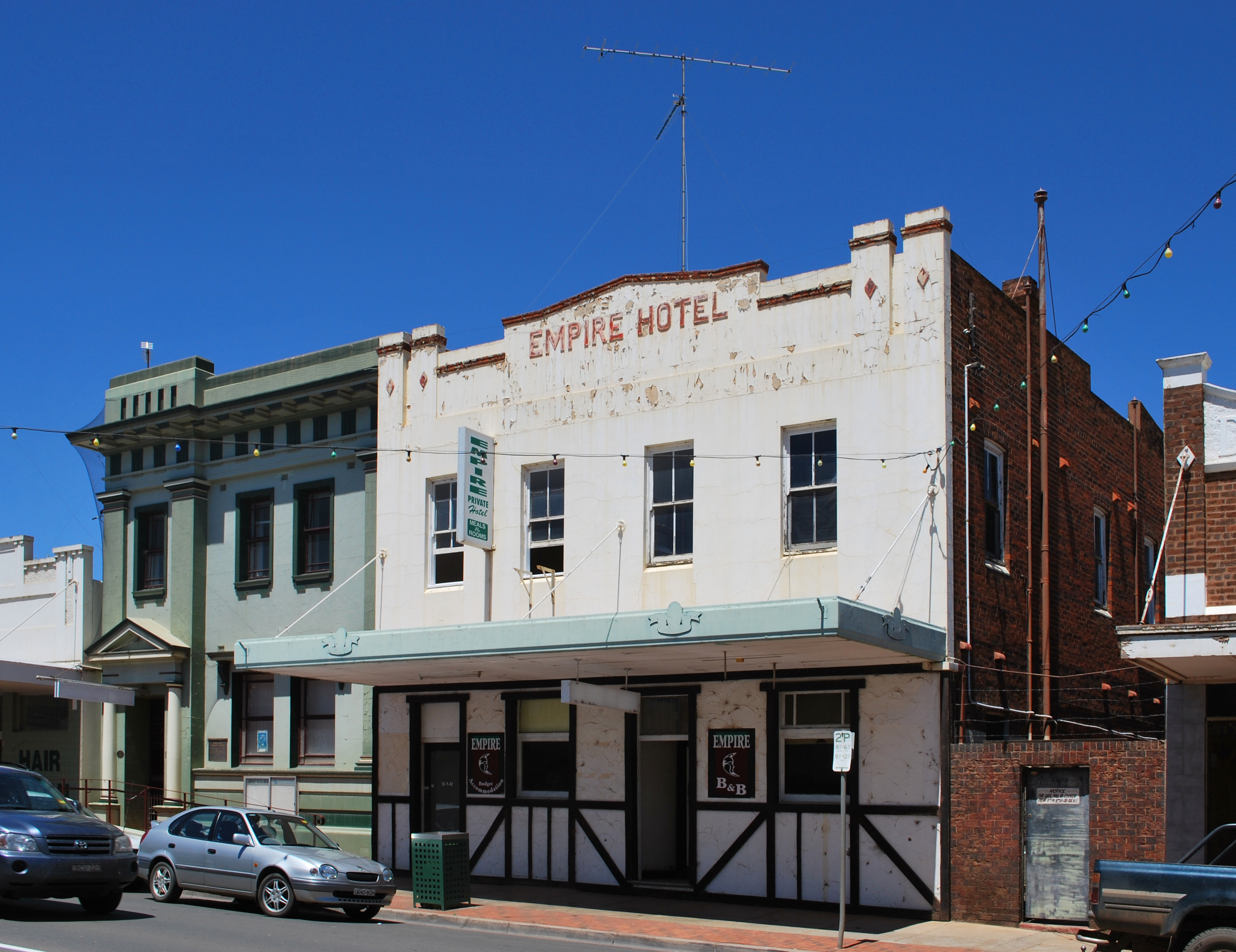
Empire Hotel

== Media ==
The West Wyalong Advocate newspaper is an independent publication, printed on Fridays. It also services nearby towns including Ungarie and Barmedman.

94.5 GOLD FM is West Wyalong's community radio station. It is an independent not-for-profit community broadcaster founded in 2001.

West Wyalong Movies is a project by Ross Harmer aimed at documenting the history of West Wyalong and The Bland Shire.

== Surrounding towns ==
• Barmedman	(32 km or 20 mi)
• Burcher	(52 km or 32 mi)
• Tallimba	(34 km or 21 mi)
• Ungarie	(42 km or 26 mi)
• Weethalle	(57 km or 35 mi)
• Wyalong	(3.5 km or 2.2 mi)
