= Mat McLachlan =

Australian author, historian and television presenter

Mat McLachlan is an Australian author, historian and television presenter. His first book, Walking With the Anzacs: A Guide to Australian Battlefields on the Western Front, was published by Hachette Australia in February 2007. It was reprinted in 2008, 2009, 2011, 2012, 2013 and 2014. A fully revised edition was published in 2015.

His second book, Gallipoli: The Battlefield Guide, was published in April 2010 and reprinted in 2015.

In 2007 McLachlan produced the documentary Lost in Flanders, which follows the investigation into the identities of five Australian soldiers uncovered on the First World War battlefields of Belgium. He appears as the program's key interviewee and is also Associate Producer. The documentary first screened on ABC TV 23 April 2009. McLachlan is also a regular presenter on The History Channel, a history commentator on Channel Seven's Sunrise program and regularly appears in print and on other television and radio programs.

In 2013 McLachlan hosted the 7-part National Geographic Series Australia: Life on the Edge, which was nominated for an ASTRA award for Best Factual Program. He has appeared in numerous other TV programs including Tony Robinsons World War One and Who Do You Think You Are.

McLachlan is also the founder of Mat McLachlan Battlefield Tours, a dedicated battlefield touring company that operates tours of the Western Front, Gallipoli, Vietnam, Guadalcanal and other destinations.

He was born in West Wyalong, NSW and currently lives in Sydney NSW
