= Bland County, New South Wales =

Bland
- Cadastral division
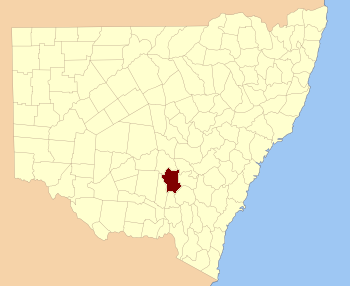
- Location in New South Wales
- Country: Australia
- State: New South Wales
Lands administrative divisions around Bland
| Gipps | Gipps | Forbes |
| Bourke | Bland | Monteagle |
| Bourke | Clarendon | Harden |

Bland County is one of the 141 cadastral divisions of New South Wales, Australia. It contains the town of Temora.

Bland County was named in honour of William Bland who was a medical practitioner and politician between (1789–1868).

== Parishes within this county ==
A full list of parishes found within this county; their current LGA and mapping coordinates to the approximate centre of each location is as follows:

| Parish | LGA | Coordinates |
|---|---|---|
| Back Creek | Bland Shire | 33°51′54″S 147°24′04″E |
| Balabla | Young Shire | 34°10′54″S 148°00′04″E |
| Barbingal | Weddin Shire | 33°53′54″S 147°47′04″E |
| Barmedman | Bland Shire | 34°05′54″S 147°23′04″E |
| Belimebung | Bland Shire | 34°00′54″S 147°23′04″E |
| Berendebba | Weddin Shire | 34°00′54″S 147°45′04″E |
| Berrigan | Weddin Shire | 33°47′54″S 147°34′04″E |
| Berthong | Young Shire | 34°23′54″S 148°07′04″E |
| Bimbella | Bland Shire | 33°45′54″S 147°30′04″E |
| Bimbi | Weddin Shire | 33°59′54″S 148°00′04″E |
| Boginderra | Temora Shire | 34°09′54″S 147°38′04″E |
| Bolungerai | Weddin Shire | 33°50′54″S 148°00′04″E |
| Boonabah | Bland Shire | 34°00′54″S 147°28′04″E |
| Boonabah | Bland Shire | 34°00′54″S 147°31′04″E |
| Boorongagil | Bland Shire | 34°00′54″S 147°38′04″E |
| Bribbaree | Young Shire | 34°04′54″S 148°00′04″E |
| Brymur | Bland Shire | 33°50′54″S 147°31′04″E |
| Bundawarrah | Temora Shire | 34°24′54″S 147°34′04″E |
| Burrabijong | Bland Shire | 33°54′54″S 147°23′04″E |
| Caragabal | Weddin Shire | 33°51′54″S 147°41′04″E |
| Carumbi | Temora Shire | 34°16′54″S 147°44′04″E |
| Combaning | Temora Shire | 34°29′54″S 147°39′04″E |
| Congou | Cootamundra–Gundagai Regional Council | 34°29′54″S 148°00′04″E |
| Culingerai | Temora Shire | 34°13′54″S 147°24′04″E |
| Curraburrama | Bland Shire | 34°04′54″S 147°35′04″E |
| Dinga Dingi | Temora Shire | 34°23′54″S 147°48′04″E |
| Dudauman | Cootamundra–Gundagai Regional Council | 34°35′54″S 147°53′04″E |
| Eurabba | Weddin Shire | 34°04′54″S 147°50′04″E |
| Euroka | Weddin Shire | 33°59′54″S 147°50′04″E |
| Geraldra | Young Shire | 34°22′54″S 147°53′04″E |
| Gidgingidginbung | Temora Shire | 34°15′54″S 147°30′04″E |
| Gundibindyal | Temora Shire | 34°30′54″S 147°44′04″E |
| Jingerangle | Bland Shire | 33°56′54″S 147°37′04″E |
| Maleeja | Cootamundra–Gundagai Regional Council | 34°24′54″S 148°00′04″E |
| Mandamah | Bland Shire | 34°10′54″S 147°20′04″E |
| Marbunga | Bland Shire | 34°04′54″S 147°09′04″E |
| Marowrie | Weddin Shire | 33°55′54″S 148°00′04″E |
| Memagong | Young Shire | 34°15′54″S 148°08′04″E |
| Milong | Young Shire | 34°18′54″S 148°05′04″E |
| Minijary | Weddin Shire | 33°52′54″S 147°36′04″E |
| Moonbucca | Temora Shire | 34°13′54″S 147°43′04″E |
| Morangarell | Bland Shire | 34°04′54″S 147°43′04″E |
| Mugga | Bland Shire | 33°54′54″S 147°16′04″E |
| Narraburra | Temora Shire | 34°15′54″S 147°37′04″E |
| Narragudgil | Bland Shire | 33°59′54″S 147°16′04″E |
| Stockinbingal | Cootamundra–Gundagai Regional Council | 34°29′54″S 147°50′04″E |
| Thanowring | Temora Shire | 34°22′54″S 147°28′04″E |
| Therarbung | Bland Shire | 34°09′54″S 147°30′04″E |
| Thurungly | Temora Shire | 34°11′54″S 147°03′04″E |
| Thurungly | Temora Shire | 34°10′54″S 147°33′04″E |
| Trigalong | Temora Shire | 34°29′54″S 147°34′04″E |
| Tubbul | Young Shire | 34°14′54″S 148°00′04″E |
| Tumbleton | Young Shire | 34°21′54″S 148°00′04″E |
| Waarbilla | Bland Shire | 34°04′54″S 147°30′04″E |
| Waarbilla | Bland Shire | 34°04′54″S 147°28′04″E |
| Walladilly | Temora Shire | 34°31′54″S 147°28′04″E |
| Wallundry | Temora Shire | 34°22′54″S 147°42′04″E |
| Wargin | Bland Shire | 34°07′54″S 147°16′04″E |
| Warralonga | Bland Shire | 33°55′54″S 147°32′04″E |
| Weedallion | Young Shire | 34°09′54″S 147°54′04″E |
| Wyalong South | Bland Shire | 34°09′54″S 147°10′04″E |
| Wyrra | Bland Shire | 33°49′54″S 147°17′04″E |
| Yarran | Young Shire | 34°14′54″S 147°50′04″E |
| Yeo Yeo | Cootamundra–Gundagai Regional Council | 34°30′54″S 147°58′04″E |
| Yerai | Young Shire | 34°09′54″S 147°47′04″E |
| Yiddah | Bland Shire | 34°03′54″S 147°17′04″E |
| Yuline | Weddin Shire | 33°47′54″S 148°00′04″E |
