= Gipps County =

Gipps
- Cadastral division
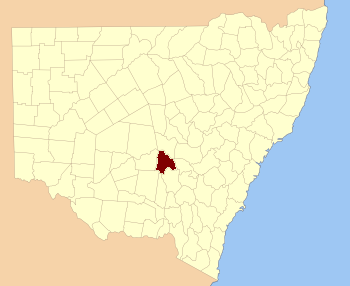
- Location in New South Wales
- Country: Australia
- State: New South Wales
Lands administrative divisions around Gipps
Blaxland	Cunningham	Ashburnham
Dowling	Gipps	Forbes
Cooper	Bourke	Bland

Gipps County is one of the 141 cadastral divisions of New South Wales, named in honour of the mid-19th century Governor of New South Wales, Sir George Gipps.

== Parishes ==
A full list of parishes found within this county, their current LGA and mapping coordinates to their approximate centres is as follows:

Parish	LGA	Coordinates
Banar	Lachlan Shire Council	33°15′54″S 147°04′04″E
Bena	Lachlan Shire Council	33°21′54″S 147°16′04″E
Bibbijolee	Bland Shire Council	33°40′54″S 146°53′04″E
Bimbeen	Bland Shire Council	33°39′54″S 147°06′04″E
Blow Clear	Bland Shire Council	33°41′54″S 147°13′04″E
Bogandillon	Lachlan Shire Council	33°17′54″S 147°18′04″E
Bolagamy	Bland Shire Council	33°42′54″S 147°01′04″E
Brolga	Bland Shire Council	33°51′54″S 146°50′04″E
Bygalorie	Lachlan Shire Council	33°27′54″S 146°47′04″E
Cadalgulee	Forbes Shire Council	33°36′54″S 147°33′04″E
Cadow	Lachlan Shire Council	33°18′54″S 147°28′04″E
Caragabal	Weddin Shire Council	33°47′41″S 147°38′59″E
Carawandool	Forbes Shire Council	33°33′54″S 147°41′04″E
Clear Ridge	Bland Shire Council	33°43′54″S 147°17′04″E
Cookaburragong	Lachlan Shire Council	33°20′54″S 147°04′04″E
Corringle	Bland Shire Council	33°38′54″S 147°22′04″E
Cowal	Bland Shire Council	33°42′54″S 147°24′04″E
Crown Camp	Lachlan Shire Council	33°24′54″S 147°01′04″E
Currah	Lachlan Shire Council	33°25′54″S 147°02′04″E
Currah	Lachlan Shire Council	33°29′54″S 147°00′04″E
Euglo	Lachlan Shire Council	33°25′54″S 147°10′04″E
Euglo South	Lachlan Shire Council	33°27′54″S 147°10′04″E
Gibrigal	Forbes Shire Council	33°31′54″S 147°33′04″E
Goobothery	Lachlan Shire Council	33°08′54″S 146°49′04″E
Gormans Hill	Lachlan Shire Council	33°24′54″S 146°48′04″E
Hiawatha	Bland Shire Council	33°48′54″S 147°13′04″E
Ilgindrie	Lachlan Shire Council	33°15′54″S 147°11′04″E
Ina	Lachlan Shire Council	33°23′54″S 147°27′04″E
Jemalong West	Forbes Shire Council	33°30′54″S 147°43′04″E
Kalingan	Bland Shire Council	33°35′54″S 147°09′04″E
Lake	Forbes Shire Council	33°36′54″S 147°30′04″E
Livingstone	Lachlan Shire Council	33°31′54″S 147°12′04″E
Manna	Lachlan Shire Council	33°23′54″S 147°22′04″E
Marsden	Weddin Shire Council	33°44′54″S 147°32′04″E
Merribooka	Lachlan Shire Council	33°20′54″S 146°55′04″E
Merrimarotherie	Lachlan Shire Council	33°15′54″S 147°01′04″E
Milbee	Lachlan Shire Council	33°17′54″S 147°01′04″E
Mildil	Bland Shire Council	33°51′54″S 147°00′04″E
Moonbia	Lachlan Shire Council	33°17′54″S 147°23′04″E
Moora Moora	Lachlan Shire Council	33°27′54″S 147°27′04″E
Mulga	Bland Shire Council	33°53′54″S 147°04′04″E
Murrengreen	Bland Shire Council	33°43′54″S 146°51′04″E
Nerang Cowal	Lachlan Shire Council	33°27′54″S 147°20′04″E
Pullabooka	Weddin Shire Council	33°47′54″S 147°45′04″E
Pulligal	Lachlan Shire Council	33°20′54″S 146°49′04″E
South Borambil	Lachlan Shire Council	33°14′54″S 147°17′04″E
South Condobolin	Lachlan Shire Council	33°08′54″S 147°07′04″E
South Gulgo	Lachlan Shire Council	33°07′54″S 147°02′04″E
South Micabil	Lachlan Shire Council	33°06′54″S 146°54′04″E
Thulloo	Bland Shire Council	33°42′54″S 146°46′04″E
Tirranna	Weddin Shire Council	33°45′54″S 147°40′04″E
Towyal	Forbes Shire Council	33°24′54″S 147°39′04″E
Trigalana	Weddin Shire Council	33°38′54″S 147°37′04″E
Udah	Bland Shire Council	33°47′54″S 147°05′04″E
Ugalong	Lachlan Shire Council	33°31′54″S 147°04′04″E
Ungarie	Bland Shire Council	33°38′54″S 147°02′04″E
Wallaroi	Lachlan Shire Council	33°11′54″S 146°54′04″E
Wamboyne	Bland Shire Council	33°36′54″S 147°13′04″E
Warangla	Forbes Shire Council	33°38′54″S 147°44′04″E
Wardry	Lachlan Shire Council	33°13′54″S 146°50′04″E
Warroo	Forbes Shire Council	33°22′54″S 147°33′04″E
Weelah	Lachlan Shire Council	33°23′54″S 147°15′04″E
West Plains	Forbes Shire Council	33°31′54″S 147°39′04″E
Wheoga	Forbes Shire Council	33°41′54″S 148°00′04″E
Wilbertroy	Forbes Shire Council	33°27′54″S 147°33′04″E
Wilga	Lachlan Shire Council	33°22′45″S 146°54′40″E
Wilga South	Lachlan Shire Council	33°27′54″S 146°54′04″E
Wollongough	Bland Shire Council	33°33′31″S 146°54′09″E
Wyalong	Bland Shire Council	33°54′54″S 147°10′04″E
Yarnel	Lachlan Shire Council	33°20′54″S 147°10′04″E
Younga Plain	Bland Shire Council	33°43′54″S 147°06′04″E
Youngareen	Bland Shire Council	33°38′54″S 146°46′04″E
