= Forbes County =

Forbes New South Wales
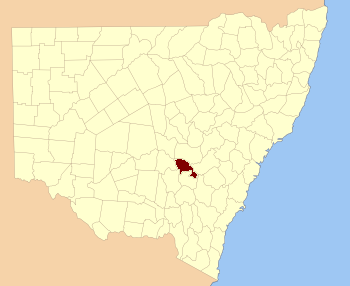
- Location in New South Wales
Lands administrative divisions around Forbes:
Cunningham	Ashburnham	Bathurst
Gipps	Forbes	Bathurst
Bland	Monteagle	King

Forbes County is one of the 141 cadastral divisions of New South Wales.

Forbes County was named in honour of Chief Justice Sir Francis Forbes (1784–1841). It is located south of the Lachlan River near Forbes, down to Grenfell. It includes the area along the Lachlan east to Cowra and the Boorowa River, and also south to Koorawatha.

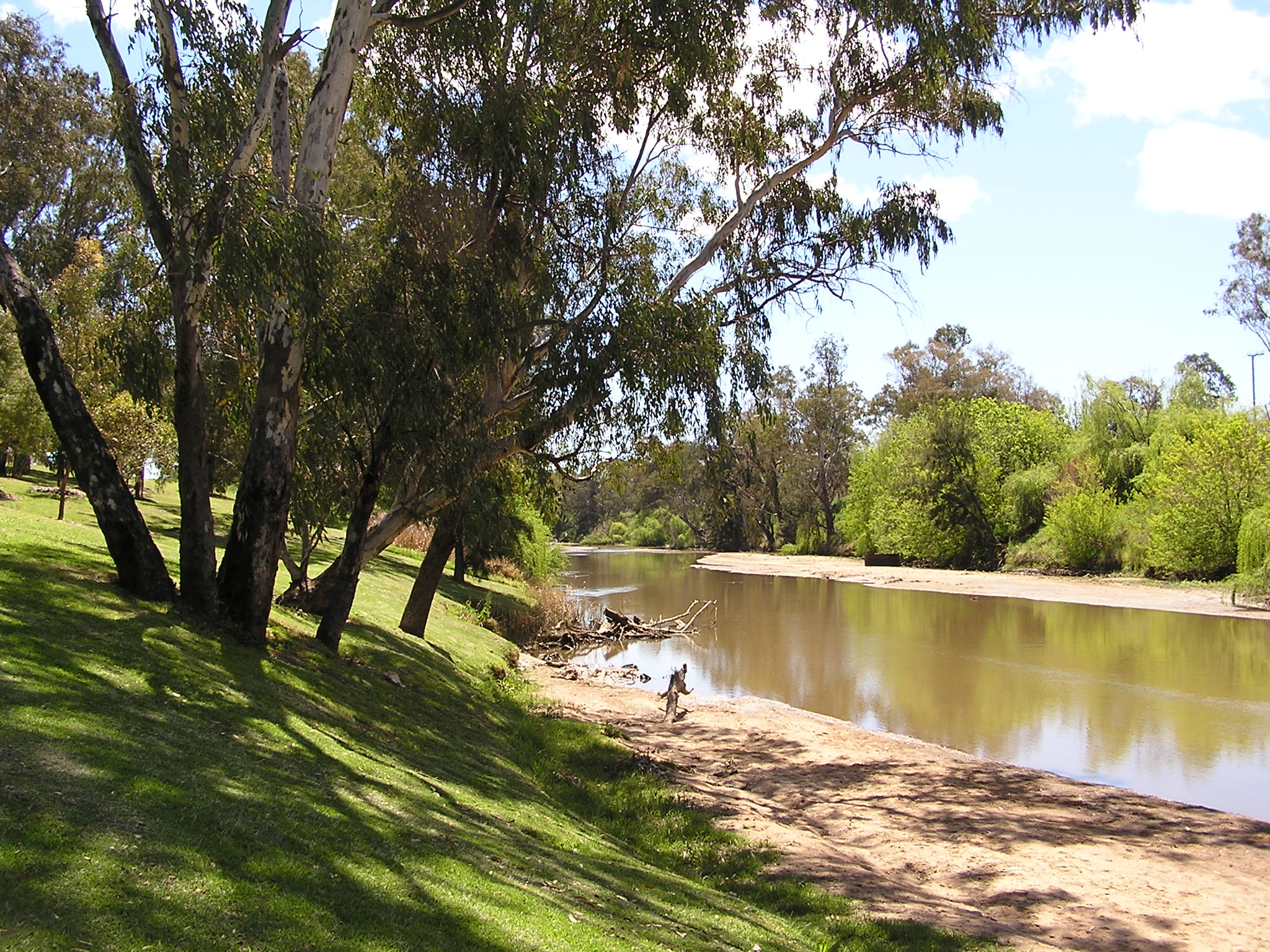
The Lachlan River at Cowra; the river is the boundary between Forbes and Bathurst

== Parishes within this county ==
A full list of parishes found within this county; their current LGA and mapping coordinates to the approximate centre of each location is as follows:

Parish	LGA	Coordinates
Bandon	Forbes Shire	33°31′54″S 148°15′04″E
Bang Bang	Cowra Shire	34°01′54″S 148°38′04″E
Binda	Weddin Shire	33°38′54″S 148°23′04″E
Birangan	Weddin Shire	33°42′54″S 148°07′04″E
Bogolong	Weddin Shire	33°48′54″S 148°05′04″E
Boyd	Forbes Shire	33°54′54″S 147°36′04″E
Braulin	Forbes Shire	33°30′54″S 148°01′04″E
Broula	Cowra Shire	33°50′54″S 148°33′04″E
Bundaburrah	Forbes Shire	33°30′54″S 147°53′04″E
Conimbla	Cowra Shire	33°46′54″S 148°31′04″E
Cudgelong	Cowra Shire	33°54′54″S 148°46′04″E
Cumbijowa	Forbes Shire	33°25′54″S 148°08′04″E
Currowong	Forbes Shire	33°40′54″S 147°50′04″E
Erasa	Forbes Shire	33°15′54″S 148°12′04″E
Eualdrie	Weddin Shire	33°53′54″S 148°03′04″E
Gooloogong	Cowra Shire	33°39′54″S 148°31′04″E
Goonigal	Forbes Shire	33°37′54″S 148°17′04″E
Jemalong	Forbes Shire	33°26′54″S 147°48′04″E
Kangarooby	Weddin Shire	33°42′54″S 148°20′04″E
Maudry	Forbes Shire	33°41′54″S 148°03′04″E
Melyra	Weddin Shire	33°48′54″S 148°11′04″E
Merriganowry	Cowra Shire	33°44′54″S 148°32′04″E
Morongla	Cowra Shire	33°53′54″S 148°39′04″E
Mulyan	Cowra Shire	33°48′54″S 148°35′04″E
Mulyandry	Forbes Shire	33°31′54″S 148°07′04″E
Nanima	Forbes Shire	33°31′54″S 148°20′04″E
Neila	Cowra Shire	34°01′54″S 148°43′04″E
Ooma	Forbes Shire	33°38′54″S 148°09′04″E
Tallabung	Forbes Shire	33°33′54″S 147°49′04″E
Thurungle	Forbes Shire	33°35′54″S 148°02′04″E
Waayourigong	Forbes Shire	33°25′54″S 147°54′04″E
Wallah Wallah	Weddin Shire	33°44′54″S 148°15′04″E
Warraderry	Weddin Shire	33°41′54″S 148°13′04″E
Warrangong	Cowra Shire	33°59′54″S 148°30′04″E
Warrumba	Cowra Shire	33°48′54″S 148°22′04″E
Wattamondara	Cowra Shire	33°54′54″S 148°37′04″E
Wheoga	Weddin Shire	33°45′54″S 147°56′04″E
Wongajong	Forbes Shire	33°25′54″S 148°02′04″E
