= Yiddah =

Yiddah New South Wales
- Coordinates: 34°03′54″S 147°17′04″E
- Postcode(s): 2671
- Elevation: 232 m (761 ft)
- Location: 474 km (295 mi) W of Sydney; 138 km (86 mi) N of Wagga Wagga; 18 km (11 mi) SE of West Wyalong
- LGA(s): Bland Shire
- State electorate(s): Cootamundra
- Federal division(s): Parkes

Yiddah is a locality in New South Wales, Australia. The locality is 474 kilometres (295 mi) west of the state capital, Sydney about midway between the towns of West Wyalong and Barmedman. Yiddah is in the Bland Shire local government area and Bland county cadastral area.

Yiddah railway station (Opened - 02 Dec 1903, Closed - 04 May 1975)) is on the Lake Cargelligo railway line. There is a grain silo and siding there.
