= Bathurst County =

Bathurst
- Cadastral division
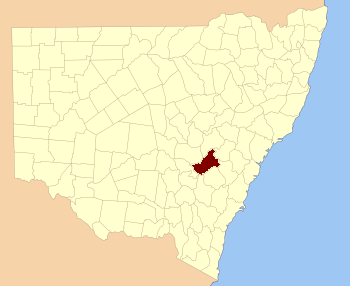
- Location in New South Wales
- Country: Australia
- State: New South Wales
Lands administrative divisions around Bathurst
Ashburnham	Wellington	Roxburgh
Forbes	Bathurst	Westmoreland
Monteagle	King	Georgiana

Bathurst County was one of the original Nineteen Counties in New South Wales and is now one of the 141 cadastral divisions of New South Wales. It includes the area to the south-west of Bathurst to Cowra and Orange. The Lachlan River is the boundary to the south-west, the Belubula River forms part of the northern boundary, with the Fish River on the northeastern boundary. Blayney is located roughly in the middle.

Bathurst County was named in honour of Henry Bathurst, 3rd Earl 1762–1834. The Electoral district of Bathurst (County) was the first state electoral district for the area, between 1856 and 1859.

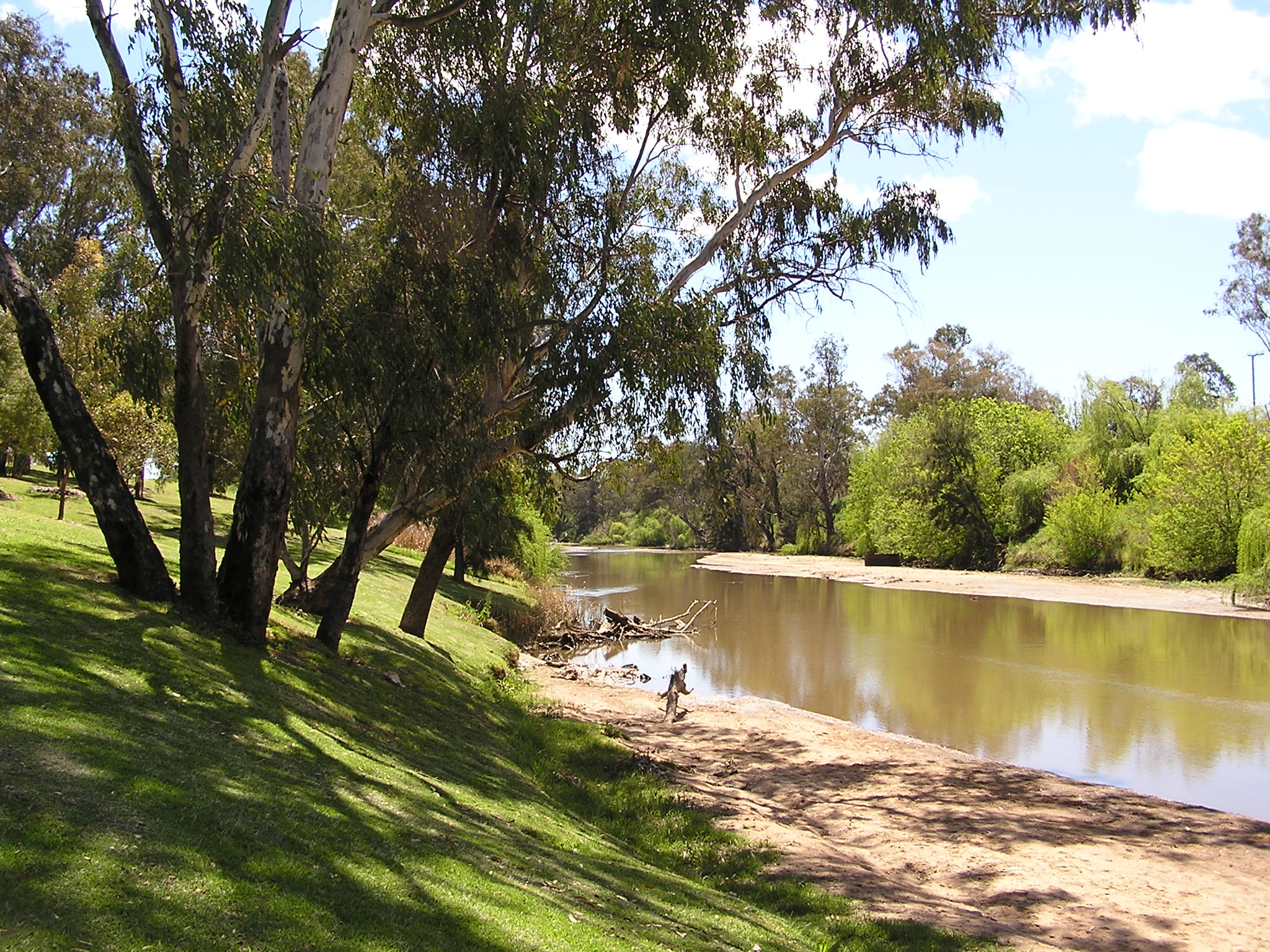
The Lachlan River at Cowra; the river is the boundary between Bathurst and Forbes

In 1852 it had an area of 1,196,400 acres (4,842 km^{2}) and population of 6,405. At this time it was described as having some of the best wool in the colony, with excellent farming land.

== Parishes within this county ==
A full list of parishes found within this county; their current LGA and mapping coordinates to the approximate centre of each location is as follows:

Parish	LGA	Coordinates
Aberfoil	Cabonne Shire	33°06′54″S 149°19′04″E
Anson	Cabonne Shire	33°19′54″S 149°13′04″E
Apsley	Bathurst Regional Council	33°30′54″S 149°34′04″E
Arkell	Bathurst Regional Council	33°38′54″S 149°35′04″E
Bangaroo	Cowra Shire	33°36′54″S 148°33′04″E
Bathurst	Bathurst Regional Council	33°25′54″S 149°34′04″E
Beaufort	Blayney Shire	33°31′54″S 149°06′04″E
Belubula	Blayney Shire	33°34′54″S 149°03′04″E
Beneree	Cabonne Shire	33°25′54″S 149°05′04″E
Billimari	Cowra Shire	33°39′54″S 148°38′04″E
Blake	Blayney Shire	33°31′54″S 148°59′04″E
Bracebridge	Cowra Shire	33°48′54″S 148°58′04″E
Bringellet	Oberon Shire	33°39′54″S 149°30′04″E
Byng	Cabonne Shire	33°20′54″S 149°18′04″E
Cadogan	Bathurst Regional Council	33°21′54″S 149°22′04″E
Calvert	Blayney Shire	33°30′54″S 149°06′04″E
Canowindra	Cowra Shire	33°36′54″S 148°40′04″E
Carlton	Blayney Shire	33°31′54″S 148°56′04″E
Chaucer	Cowra Shire	33°35′54″S 148°47′04″E
Clarendon	Cabonne Shire	33°27′54″S 148°58′04″E
Clinton	Cabonne Shire	33°14′54″S 149°11′04″E
Cole	Bathurst Regional Council	33°29′54″S 149°24′04″E
Coleridge	Bathurst Regional Council	33°09′54″S 149°27′04″E
Colville	Cabonne Shire	33°23′54″S 149°16′04″E
Coota	Cowra Shire	33°49′54″S 148°46′04″E
Cowra	Cowra Shire	33°46′54″S 148°44′04″E
Dunleary	Cowra Shire	33°55′54″S 148°57′04″E
Egbert	Cowra Shire	33°45′54″S 149°10′04″E
Errol	Blayney Shire	33°33′54″S 149°11′04″E
Freemantle	Cabonne Shire	33°14′54″S 149°20′04″E
Galbraith	Blayney Shire	33°33′54″S 149°22′04″E
Glenlogan	Cowra Shire	33°46′54″S 148°39′04″E
Graham	Blayney Shire	33°27′54″S 149°12′04″E
Grantham	Bathurst Regional Council	33°29′54″S 149°30′04″E
Hampton	Cowra Shire	33°36′54″S 148°57′04″E
Huntley	Cabonne Shire	33°22′54″S 149°07′04″E
Kenilworth	Cowra Shire	33°45′54″S 148°50′04″E
Lennox	Cabonne Shire	33°11′54″S 149°17′04″E
Lindsay	Blayney Shire	33°30′54″S 149°13′04″E
Lowry	Bathurst Regional Council	35°33′54″S 149°27′04″E
Lucan	Blayney Shire	33°42′54″S 149°01′04″E
Lucan	Blayney Shire	33°45′54″S 148°00′04″E
Lyndhurst	Blayney Shire	33°37′54″S 149°01′04″E
Malmsbury	Bathurst Regional Council	33°26′54″S 149°25′04″E
Malongulli	Cowra Shire	33°35′54″S 148°53′04″E
Milburn	Cowra Shire	33°53′54″S 148°49′04″E
Mount Pleasant	Bathurst Regional Council	33°25′54″S 149°31′04″E
Napier	Blayney Shire	33°33′54″S 149°17′04″E
Neville	Blayney Shire	33°40′54″S 149°14′04″E
Oakley	Bathurst Regional Council	33°37′54″S 149°40′04″E
Orange	City of Orange	33°18′42″S 149°07′07″E
Osborne	Blayney Shire	33°36′54″S 149°15′04″E
Ponsonby	Bathurst Regional Council	33°36′54″S 149°33′04″E
Purfleet	Cowra Shire	33°51′54″S 149°00′04″E
Roseberg	Cowra Shire	33°50′54″S 149°05′04″E
Shadforth	Cabonne Shire	33°23′54″S 149°12′04″E
Shaw	Blayney Shire	33°37′54″S 149°10′04″E
Somers	Blayney Shire	33°40′54″S 149°07′04″E
St David	Bathurst Regional Council	33°11′54″S 149°24′04″E
Tenandra	Cowra Shire	33°39′54″S 148°47′04″E
Three Brothers	Blayney Shire	33°38′54″S 149°21′04″E
Tintern	Cowra Shire	33°49′54″S 148°53′04″E
Torrens	Blayney Shire	33°28′54″S 149°19′04″E
Vittoria	Cabonne Shire	33°24′54″S 149°22′04″E
Waldegrave	Cabonne Shire	33°24′54″S 149°00′04″E
Walli	Cabonne Shire	33°40′54″S 148°52′04″E
Waugoola	Cowra Shire	33°46′54″S 148°56′04″E
Worcester	Cabonne Shire	33°15′54″S 149°14′04″E
