= Morongla Creek =

Coordinates: 33°51′44″S 148°40′27″E

Morongla Creek is a stream near Mount Morris and Slatterys Hill and runs in a generally northward direction for about 30 km before joining the Lachlan River. It passes the town of Morongla Creek, New South Wales, east of Lachlan Valley Way B81.

== See also ==
- List of rivers of New South Wales (L-Z)
- Rivers of New South Wales
