= Back Creek, New South Wales (Bland) =

Back Creek
- Suburb
- Coordinates: 33°51′54″S 147°24′4″E
- Country: Australia
- State: New South Wales
- Region: Riverina
- LGA: Bland Shire

Government
  - State electorate: Cootamundra
  - Federal division: Parkes

Population
  - Total: 54 (SAL 2021)
- Time zone: UTC+10 (AEST)
  - Summer (DST): UTC+11 (AEDT)
- Postcode: 2671

Back Creek is a small rural locality in the Bland Shire, part of the Riverina region of New South Wales, Australia.

At the 2021 census, the town recorded a population of 54.
