= Bland County =

Bland County may refer to:

- Bland County, Virginia, United States
- Bland County, New South Wales, Australia
