= Bimbi =

Bimbi may refer to:

- Bimbi, New South Wales
- Bimbi, mother of Bimbisara (r. 544 BC – 492 BC), king of Magadha in ancient India
- Bartolomeo Bimbi (1648–1729), Italian painter
- Bimbi (singer) (1908–1991), Cuban singer born Maximiliano Sánchez
- Bimbi (actor), Indian actor featured on the 1971 film Phir Bhi
- Bimbi (cult), a form of African traditional religion in Malawi

== See also ==
- Bimby, cooking appliance
