= Billimari =

Billimari New South Wales
- Coordinates: 33°41′0″S 148°36′0″E
- Population: 117 (SAL 2021)
- Postcode(s): 2804
- Location: 323 km (201 mi) W of Sydney; 121 km (75 mi) WSW of Bathurst; 23 km (14 mi) N of Cowra
- LGA(s): Cowra Shire
- State electorate(s): Cootamundra
- Federal division(s): Riverina

Billimari is a town and locality in the Central West region of New South Wales, Australia. The locality is in the Cowra Shire local government area, 323 kilometres (201 mi) west of the state capital Sydney and approximately 23 kilometres (14 mi) north of the regional centre of Cowra.

== History ==
The name "Billimari" is Aboriginal for "plenty of water" in the local Wiradjuri language.

In 1923 the existing silo was built which had a dramatic effect on day-to-day business in the village as there was no longer a need for wheat to be transported to nearby centres. Around the same time the neighbouring townships of Canowindra and Cowra began to flourish to the detriment of Billimari. Over time the village hall started to deteriorate as a result. In the early 1970s, Locals rallied to repair the hall and in 1976 the "Billican" was formed which produces plays among its many fund raising activities for charity. The Billican earned the Cowra Council's Australia Day Award for Service to the Community in 1994.

The first automatic telephone exchange was set up 16 September 1971 and Madeline Forgie became the postmistress on 19 November 1973.

The railway station is on the now closed Eugowra railway line.

Billimari is also the habitat for the green and golden bell frog (Litoria aurea), also named the green bell frog, green and golden swamp frog and green frog
