= Howick Street houses, Bathurst =

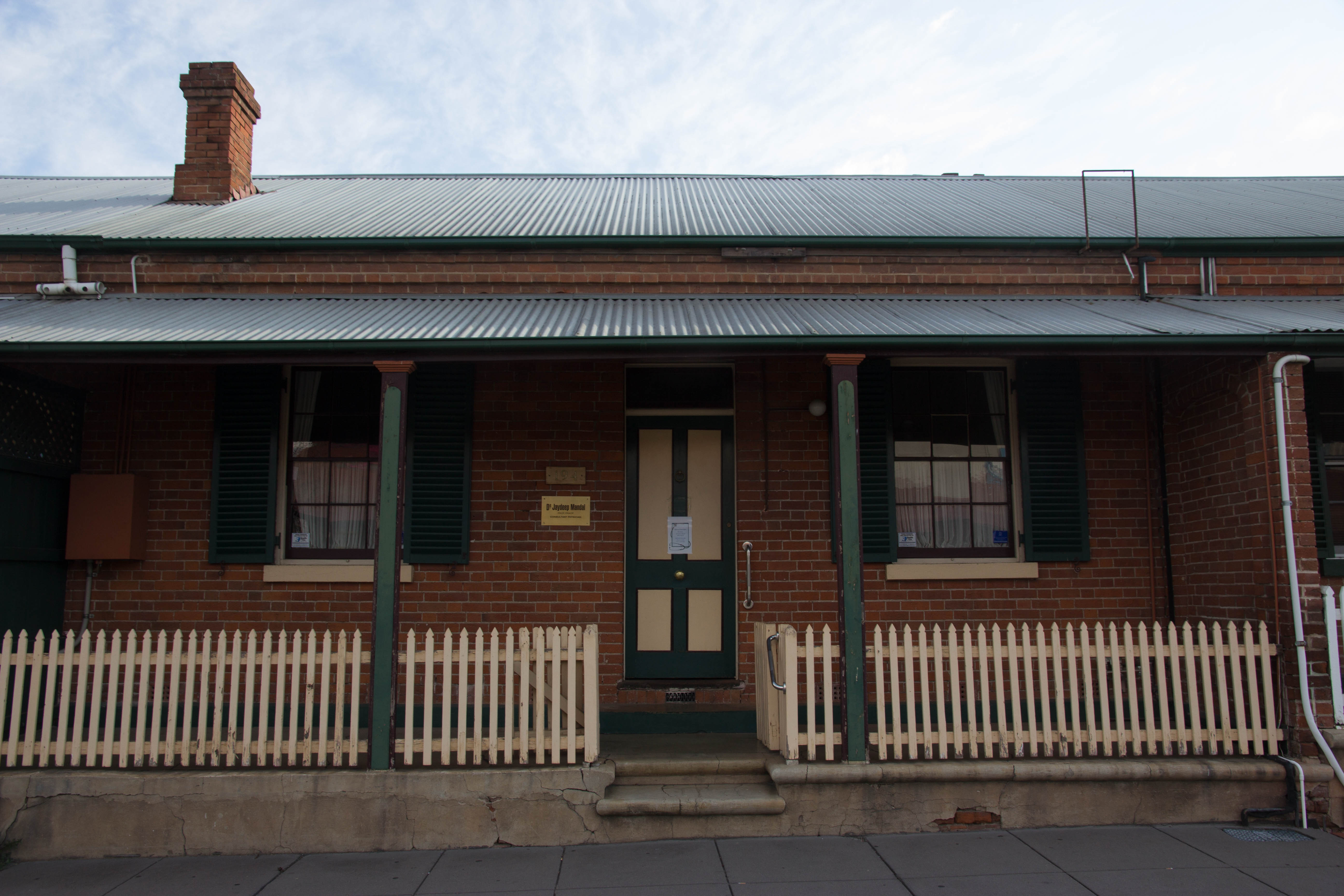
- 194 Howick Street, Bathurst, New South Wales

- Location within New South Wales Location within Australia
- 33°25′07″S 149°34′57″E
- Location: 1. 194–196 Howick Street; 2. 198 Howick Street; 3. 200–202 Howick Street; Bathurst, Bathurst Region, New South Wales, Australia

History
- Built: 1850–

Site notes
- Architectural style: Victorian Georgian

New South Wales Heritage Register
- Official name: Semi-detached Cottages; Terrace Cottages (LEP 2014)
- Type: State heritage (built)
- Designated: 2 April 1999
- Reference no.: 244
- Type: Cottages
- Category: Residential buildings (private)

The Howick Street houses are five heritage-listed neighbouring semi-detached houses at 194, 196, 198, 200 and 202 Howick Street, Bathurst in the Central West region of New South Wales, Australia. 194, 196 and 198 are separately heritage-listed, while 200 and 202 are listed together. The houses are privately owned. It is also known as Terrace Cottages (LEP 2014). The five houses were all added to the New South Wales State Heritage Register on 2 April 1999.

== History ==
=== 194 and 196 Howick Street ===
194 and 196 Howick Street are part of a row of three Victorian Georgian properties comprising a former corner shop and two residences which are part of a late Georgian streetscape on the corners of Bentinck and Howick Streets. They are of a style now rare in central Bathurst.

They are a pair of Victorian Georgian single storey attached residences of face brick under a hipped iron roof. They have a symmetrical façade with central four panelled front doors flanked by 12 paned double hung sash windows with timber louvered shutters. Full width hip – roofed verandah supported by flat timber posts with timber picket balustrade.

=== 198 Howick Street ===
198 Howick Street is a simple, well maintained late Georgian style cottage, one of a group of similar cottages which forms a unified colonial Georgian streetscape on the corner of Howick and Bentinck Streets. It is of a modest style now rare in the Central commercial area of Bathurst.

It is a single-storey Victorian Georgian cottage of face brick under a gabled iron roof. The cottage has a symmetrical façade with central four-panelled front door, flanked by large-paned double-hung sash windows. It has a full-width verandah supported by square timber posts with timber picket balustrade.

It is now used for commercial purposes and tenanted by a hearing clinic.

=== 200–202 Howick Street ===
200–202 Howick Street is on land part of a grant to Richard Stark in 1835 and part of another grant to George Sutton that same year. It is a brick Victorian Georgian duplex built in the 1850s, primarily as a rental property. It changed hands to Percy Arandel Rabett, gentleman (1886), John Stephen Brown (1886), was left in a will to 14 beneficiaries in 1912, passing to H. McFarlane in 1912 and (another part of the land) in 1917. In 1935 Jr. Burfitt and C. J. Holman were appointed trustees over the property. In 1953 a new trustee C. Holman and W. G. Hall were appointed. In 1966 it was owned by V. & M. S. Sinigaglia. In 1973 it was sold by J. K, and B. S. Weal to E. M.Pugh. In 1976 its title was held by the National Trust of Australia (NSW) and in 1982 its title was held by Mark Handley Anlezark.

In 1982 the National Trust of Australia (NSW) advised the Heritage Council that it intended to sell 200-202 Howick Street and was seeking to ensure the property would be protected in future. The cottages were owned and used by the Trust under its Small Houses Scheme. At its meeting of 21 July 1982 the Heritage Council resolved to recommend to the Minister that a Permanent Conservation Order be placed. This followed in 1983 and it transferred to the State Heritage Register in 1999.

== Description ==
The building consists of two late-Georgian semi-detached cottages with good detailing. It has bonded red brick walls and flat brick arches over openings. The building has 12 pane windows, 4 panelled doors and wooden picket fences to a verandah which faces directly onto the street alignment. The verandah roof is of galvanised iron and is supported on timber lattice columns. There are brick, detached kitchens at the rear of the building.

A brick Victorian Georgian duplex built in the 1850s. It is also part of a group of late-Georgian cottages which extend down and around the corner all built in the same period, which present harmonious human-scale urban architecture to the local streetscape. As cottages the style and age (1850s) are of a type which are very rare in Bathurst.

== Heritage listing ==
=== 198 Howick Street ===
198 Howick Street is a simple, well maintained Georgian-Victorian cottage, one of a group of similar cottages that forms a unified streetscape in Howick Street. It is of a style now rare in Bathurst.

=== 200–202 Howick Street ===
The building is part of a unified group of late Georgian cottages which present harmonious, human-scale urban architecture to the local streetscape. As cottages the style and age (1850s) are of a type which are very rare in Bathurst.

== See also ==
- Australian residential architectural styles
