= Ashburnham County =

Ashburnham New South Wales
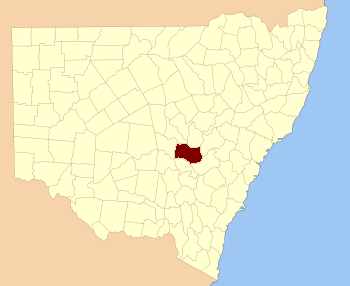
- Location in New South Wales
Lands administrative divisions around Ashburnham:
Kennedy	Gordon	Wellington
Cunningham	Ashburnham	Bathurst
Gipps	Forbes	Bathurst

Ashburnham County, New South Wales is one of the 141 cadastral divisions of New South Wales. The Lachlan River and Belubula River is the southern boundary. It includes Parkes and Forbes.

Ashburnham County was named in honour of Bertram Ashburnham (1797–1878), who became the 4th earl of Ashburnham in 1830.

== Parishes within this county ==
A full list of parishes found within this county; their current LGA and mapping coordinates to the approximate centre of each location is as follows:

Parish	LGA	Coordinates
Barrajin	Cabonne Shire Council	33°29′54″S 148°45′04″E
Barton	Cabonne Shire Council	33°15′54″S 148°57′04″E
Beargamil	Parkes Shire Council	33°03′54″S 148°18′04″E
Bell	Cabonne Shire Council	32°58′54″S 148°50′04″E
Belubula	Cabonne Shire Council	33°31′54″S 148°34′04″E
Bocobidgle	Forbes Shire Council	33°20′54″S 147°56′04″E
Bindogundra	Parkes Shire Council	33°09′54″S 148°21′04″E
Boree Cabonne	Cabonne Shire Council	33°16′54″S 148°49′04″E
Boree Nyrang	Cabonne Shire Council	33°11′54″S 148°54′04″E
Bowan	Cabonne Shire Council	33°19′54″S 148°50′04″E
Brolgan	Parkes Shire Council	33°07′54″S 148°03′04″E
Brymedura	Cabonne Shire Council	33°07′54″S 148°47′04″E
Bumberry	Parkes Shire Council	33°08′54″S 148°27′04″E
Canomodine	Cabonne Shire Council	33°31′54″S 148°50′04″E
Cargo	Cabonne Shire Council	33°25′54″S 148°50′04″E
Carrawabbity	Forbes Shire Council	33°21′54″S 147°51′04″E
Canobolas	Cabonne Shire Council	33°19′54″S 148°58′04″E
Collett	Cabonne Shire Council	33°31′54″S 148°42′04″E
Cookamidgera	Parkes Shire Council	33°14′54″S 148°16′04″E
Coonambro	Forbes Shire Council	33°14′54″S 148°22′04″E
Cudal	Cabonne Shire Council	33°16′54″S 148°43′04″E
Cumble	Cabonne Shire Council	33°04′54″S 148°42′04″E
Currajong	Parkes Shire Council	33°04′54″S 148°04′04″E
Curumbenya	Parkes Shire Council	33°02′54″S 148°25′04″E
Dowling	Forbes Shire Council	33°16′54″S 148°09′04″E
Dulladerry	Cabonne Shire Council	33°12′54″S 148°37′04″E
Edinburgh	Cabonne Shire Council	33°24′54″S 148°55′04″E
Eugowra	Forbes Shire Council	33°22′54″S 148°20′04″E
Forbes	Forbes Shire Council	33°21′54″S 148°02′04″E
Goimbla	Cabonne Shire Council	33°22′54″S 148°32′04″E
Goobang	Parkes Shire Council	33°02′54″S 148°13′04″E
Goonumbla	Parkes Shire Council	33°00′54″S 148°07′04″E
Gregra	Cabonne Shire Council	33°11′54″S 148°45′04″E
Gunningbland	Parkes Shire Council	33°04′54″S 148°00′04″E
Kamandra	Parkes Shire Council	33°08′54″S 148°15′04″E
Mandagery	Cabonne Shire Council	33°17′54″S 148°37′04″E
Manildra	Cabonne Shire Council	33°07′54″S 148°38′04″E
Martin	Parkes Shire Council	33°13′54″S 148°06′04″E
Milpose	Parkes Shire Council	32°59′54″S 148°00′04″E
Mogong	Cabonne Shire Council	33°29′54″S 148°31′04″E
Molong	Cabonne Shire Council	33°08′54″S 148°53′04″E
Moura	Cabonne Shire Council	33°18′54″S 148°32′04″E
Mugincoble	Parkes Shire Council	33°14′54″S 148°12′04″E
Mumbidgle	Forbes Shire Council	33°16′54″S 148°03′04″E
Murga	Cabonne Shire Council	33°21′54″S 148°36′04″E
Nanami	Cabonne Shire Council	33°31′54″S 148°31′04″E
Nangar	Cabonne Shire Council	33°23′54″S 148°33′04″E
Nelungalong	Parkes Shire Council	33°09′54″S 147°55′04″E
Nyrang	Cabonne Shire Council	33°29′54″S 148°41′04″E
Parkes	Parkes Shire Council	33°09′54″S 148°08′04″E
Terarra	Cabonne Shire Council	33°15′54″S 148°31′04″E
Toogong	Cabonne Shire Council	33°21′54″S 148°42′04″E
Trajere	Cabonne Shire Council	33°29′54″S 148°24′04″E
Troubalgie	Forbes Shire Council	33°21′54″S 148°08′04″E
Wanera	Forbes Shire Council	33°18′54″S 148°21′04″E
Warregal	Parkes Shire Council	33°11′54″S 148°00′04″E
Waugan	Forbes Shire Council	33°25′54″S 148°16′04″E
Wise	Forbes Shire Council	33°20′54″S 148°15′04″E
Wolabler	Cabonne Shire Council	33°06′54″S 148°30′04″E
Yarragong	Forbes Shire Council	33°13′54″S 147°53′04″E
