= Bygalorie =

Village in Lachlan Shire, New South Wales

Bygalorie is a village in Lachlan Shire Council, Central West, New South Wales Australia. It is located at 33°27S 54°S and 146°47′04'E.

It is in Gipps County and on the Lake Cargelligo railway line.
