= Monteagle County =

Monteagle
- Cadastral division
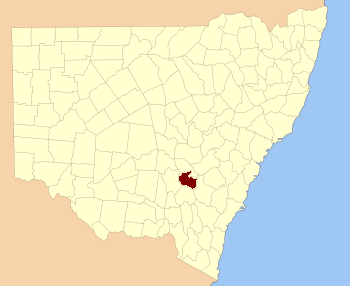
- Location in New South Wales
- Country: Australia
- State: New South Wales
Lands administrative divisions around Monteagle
Bland	Forbes	Bathurst
Bland	Monteagle	King
Harden	Harden	King

Monteagle County is one of the 141 cadastral divisions of New South Wales.

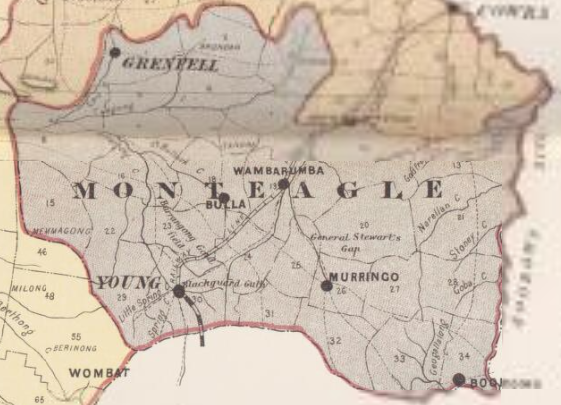
Monteagle County

Monteagle County was named in honour of Thomas Spring Rice, 1st Baron Monteagle of Brandon (1790–1866), a former Chancellor of the Exchequer.

== Parishes within this county ==
A full list of parishes found within this county; their current LGA and mapping coordinates to the approximate centre of each location is as follows:

Parish	LGA	Coordinates
Baxter	Hilltops Council	34°17′54″S 148°12′04″E
Bendick Murrell	Hilltops Council	34°03′54″S 148°29′04″E
Bribbaree	Hilltops Council	34°13′05″S 148°04′45″E
Brundah	Weddin Shire	33°54′54″S 148°11′04″E
Bumbaldry	Weddin Shire	33°54′54″S 148°30′04″E
Bungalong	Weddin Shire	33°59′54″S 148°20′04″E
Bungalong	Weddin Shire	34°00′54″S 148°20′04″E
Burramunda	Hilltops Council	34°08′54″S 148°13′04″E
Burrangong	Hilltops Council	34°14′54″S 148°15′04″E
Coba	Weddin Shire	33°59′54″S 148°15′04″E
Cocomingla	Hilltops Council	34°01′54″S 148°47′04″E
Congera	Hilltops Council	34°17′54″S 148°43′04″E
Coolegong	Hilltops Council	34°05′54″S 148°14′04″E
Cudgymaguntry	Weddin Shire	33°59′54″S 148°25′04″E
Dananbilla	Hilltops Council	34°14′54″S 148°27′04″E
Geegullalong	Hilltops Council	34°23′54″S 148°38′04″E
Gungewalla	Hilltops Council	34°18′54″S 148°37′04″E
Iandra	Weddin Shire	34°02′54″S 148°20′04″E
Illunie	Hilltops Council	34°06′54″S 148°30′04″E
Kikiamah	Hilltops Council	34°04′54″S 148°04′04″E
Marina	Hilltops Council	34°19′54″S 148°24′04″E
Murringo North	Hilltops Council	34°14′54″S 148°30′04″E
Murringo	Hilltops Council	34°14′54″S 148°30′04″E
Murrungal	Hilltops Council	34°22′54″S 148°46′04″E
Narrallen	Hilltops Council	34°11′54″S 148°39′04″E
Rossi	Hilltops Council	34°06′54″S 148°43′04″E
Thuddungara	Hilltops Council	34°13′54″S 148°09′04″E
Tyagong	Weddin Shire	34°02′54″S 148°15′04″E
Wambanumba	Hilltops Council	34°10′54″S 148°28′04″E
Weddin	Weddin Shire	33°59′54″S 148°05′04″E
Willawong	Hilltops Council	34°21′54″S 148°30′04″E
Wilton	Hilltops Council	34°08′54″S 148°18′04″E
Woodonga	Hilltops Council	34°14′54″S 148°22′04″E
Yambira	Weddin Shire	33°52′54″S 148°20′04″E
Young	Hilltops Council	34°18′54″S 148°17′04″E
Yundoo	Hilltops Council	34°13′54″S 148°44′04″E
