= Caragabal =

- Town
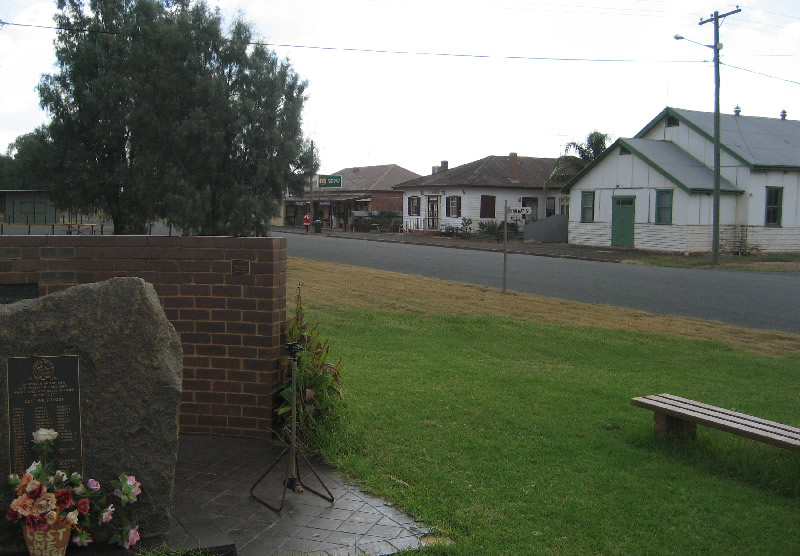
- War memorial, hall, ex-bank and pub

- Coordinates: 33°50′0″S 147°45′0″E
- Country: Australia
- State: New South Wales
- LGA: Weddin Shire
- Location: 413 km (257 mi) W of Sydney; 243 km (151 mi) NW of Canberra; 44 km (27 mi) W of Grenfell

Government
  - State electorate: Cootamundra
  - Federal division: Riverina
- Elevation: 232 m (761 ft)

Population
  - Total: 174 (SAL 2021)
- Postcode: 2810

Caragabal (/kəˈræɡəbʊl/ kə-RAG-ə-buul) is a village and locality in New South Wales 413 kilometres west of Sydney. It is situated on flat country in the Weddin Shire, just beyond where the last slopes of the Great Dividing Range meet the plains of the Central West. The Barbingal Creek runs, after rain, along the south edge of the village parallel to the Mid-Western Highway.

The village of Quandialla is 22 kilometres to the south. The towns of Grenfell, Forbes and West Wyalong are within 45 minutes' drive.

== Population ==
214 people were recorded at the 2011 census for the Caragabal area – 117 males and 97 females. An increase from the 2006 figure of 199. 66% of employed persons were in "sheep, beef cattle and grain farming". Recent decline in population is evidenced by the number of electors casting ballots at Caragabal Public School; 180 in 1998; 151 in 2004, and 127 in 2007, with a slight increase to 136 in 2011. Only 14 students were enrolled at the School in 2012, compared to 118 in 1958.

== History ==
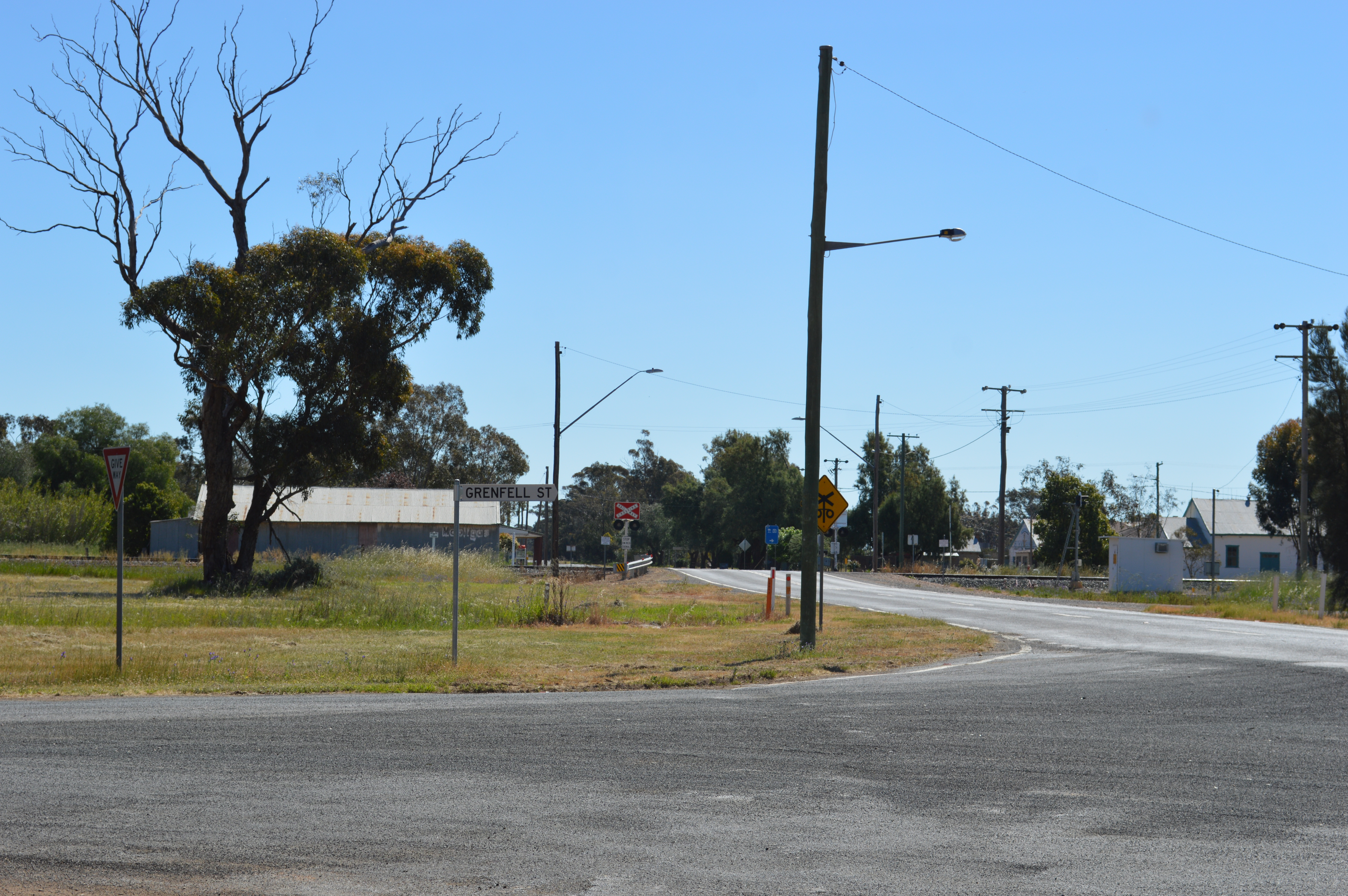
Caragabal Rail Crossing

Permanent white settlement in this part of Wiradjuri country commenced in 1835, when colonial surgeon Andrew Gibson took up extensive grazing holdings ('runs') in the area at; Bogo Bogolong (45,000 ha), Wheogo (13,680ha) and Bland (17,920ha). Gibson's Run at Bland was reduced in size in about 1848 and renamed Caragabal Station.

During the remainder of the 19th century the land was used for sheep and cattle grazing, with Marsden on the Bland Creek to the west, and Bimbi to the south-east emerging as the nearest villages. In the early 20th century closer settlement and wheat production commenced. The village of Caragabal (originally called Barbingal) began in 1914 with the building of the railway. The opening of the line from Stockinbingal in 1916 provided a much needed delivery point for the growing number of "cocky" selectors who had stacked 124,000 bags of wheat at the siding in anticipation.

Caragabal Post Office opened on 18 October 1916 and closed in 1994.

By 1917 there were two stores, a post office, three commission agents and the Royal Hotel. Churches and a school were established. The public hall was opened in 1924 with a ball attended by 200 people.

Today the village is in decline with residents tending to transact business in the towns of Forbes, Grenfell and Young. However Caragabal remains an important grain producing (wheat, canola, oats and barley) area with storage facilities dominating the townscape. Wool, fat lambs and beef cattle are also significant.

== Sport ==
In 1926 Caragabal established a women's hockey team and for many years fielded strong cricket sides. A rugby league team was also formed in 1926. However, since the 1970s rugby union has become the favoured code with many Caragabal men playing for the highly successful Grenfell Panthers.

In recent years the Caragabal community has organised annual sheep races. In 2009 the lawn bowling club merged with the golf club to form the Caragabal Country Club with an 18-hole golf course, new synthetic bowling green and tennis courts.

== Gallery ==
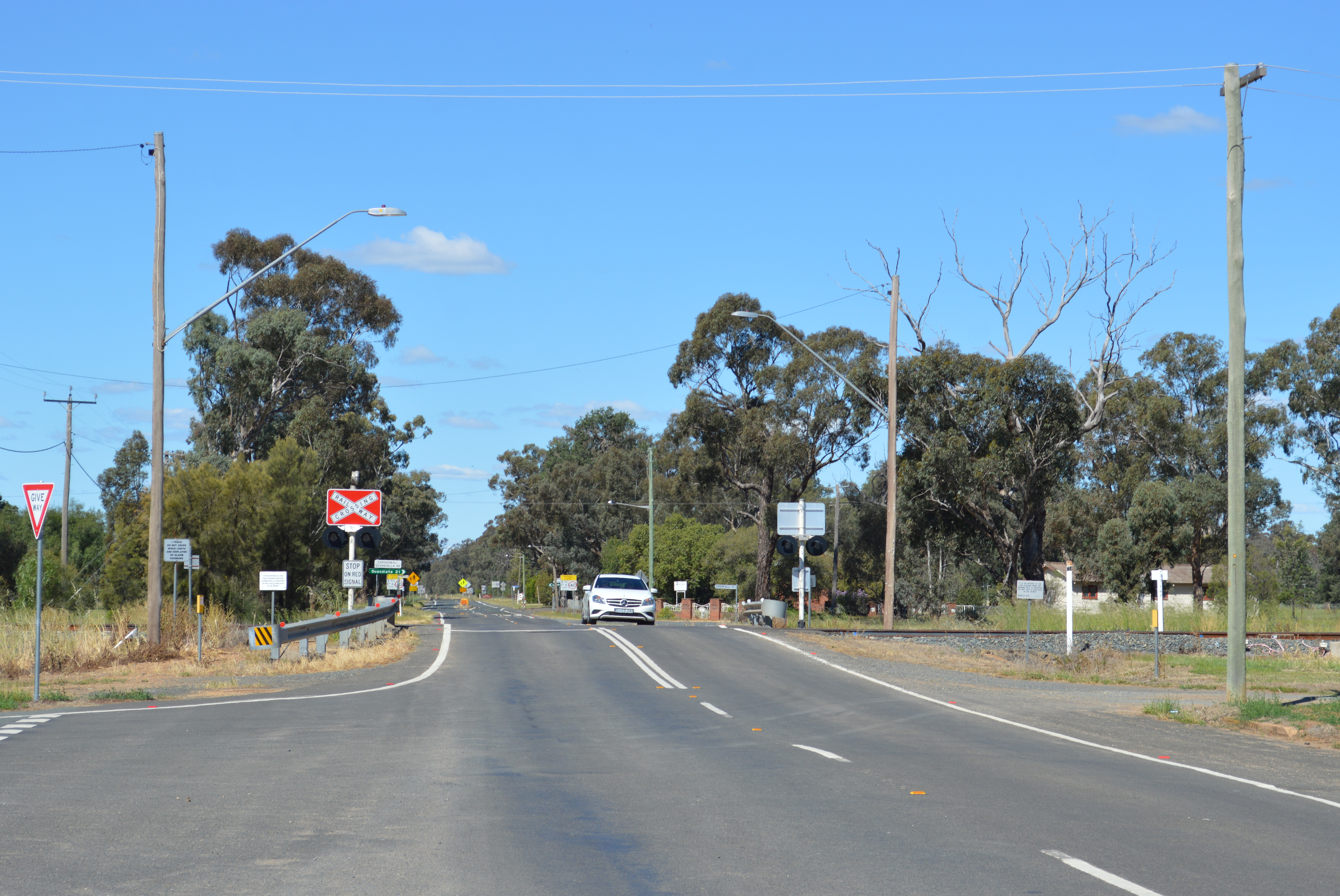
Rail Crossing

.
