= Tubbul =

Tubbul New South Wales
- Coordinates: 34°15′54″S 148°00′04″E
- Population: 63 (SAL 2021)
- Postcode(s): 2594
- Location: 30 km (19 mi) WNW of Young
- LGA(s): Hilltops Council
- State electorate(s): Cootamundra
- Federal division(s): Riverina

Tubbul is a place in southern New South Wales, Australia. The locality is in the Hilltops Council local government area.

In the 2016 census, Tubbul and surrounds had a population of 79, but had dropped to 63 at the 2021 census.

Charles Fagan was appointed teacher at the Tubbul Public School in 1895. The school closed before 1971 when the site was sold at auction.

As of 2013 there was not much remaining of the township – the school and teacher's cottage had been pulled down. The church was demolished in 1972. Built of pisé it was jointly owned by the Church of England and Presbyterian churches.

According to C. A. Irish, the name "Tubbul" is an Aboriginal word for "a bone".
