= Bimbi, New South Wales =

Bimbi New South Wales
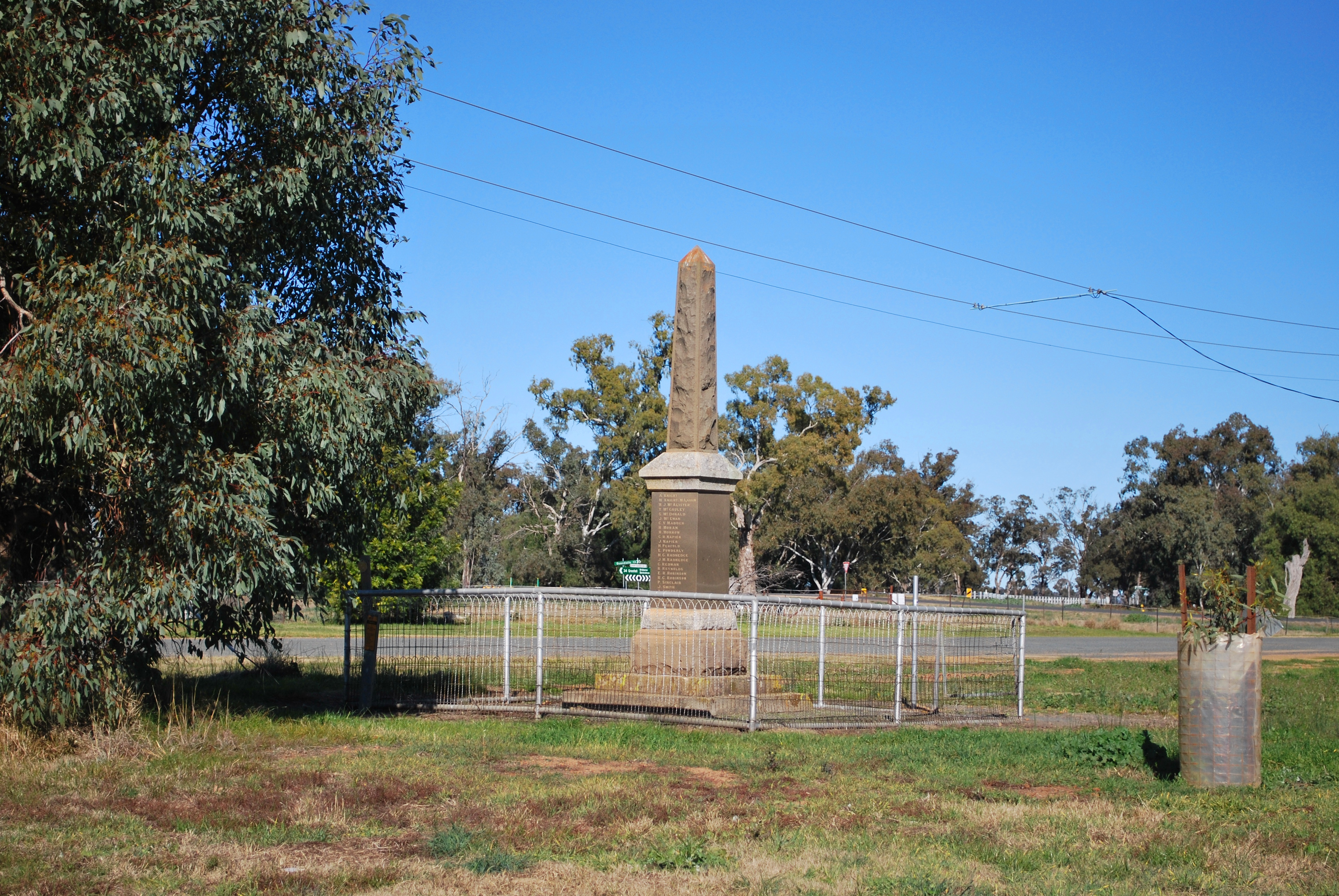
- War memorial at Bimbi

- Coordinates: 34°02′17″S 147°55′46″E
- Population: 114 (2016 census)
- Postcode(s): 2810
- Location: 395 km (245 mi) W of Sydney; 156 km (97 mi) N of Wagga Wagga; 33 km (21 mi) SW of Grenfell
- LGA(s): Weddin Shire
- State electorate(s): Cootamundra
- Federal division(s): Riverina

Bimbi is a locality in New South Wales, Australia. The locality is in the Weddin Shire local government area, 395 kilometres (245 mi) west south west of the state capital, Sydney.

At the 2016 census, Bimbi had a population of 114.
