= Morongla Creek, New South Wales =

Morongla Creek
- Town
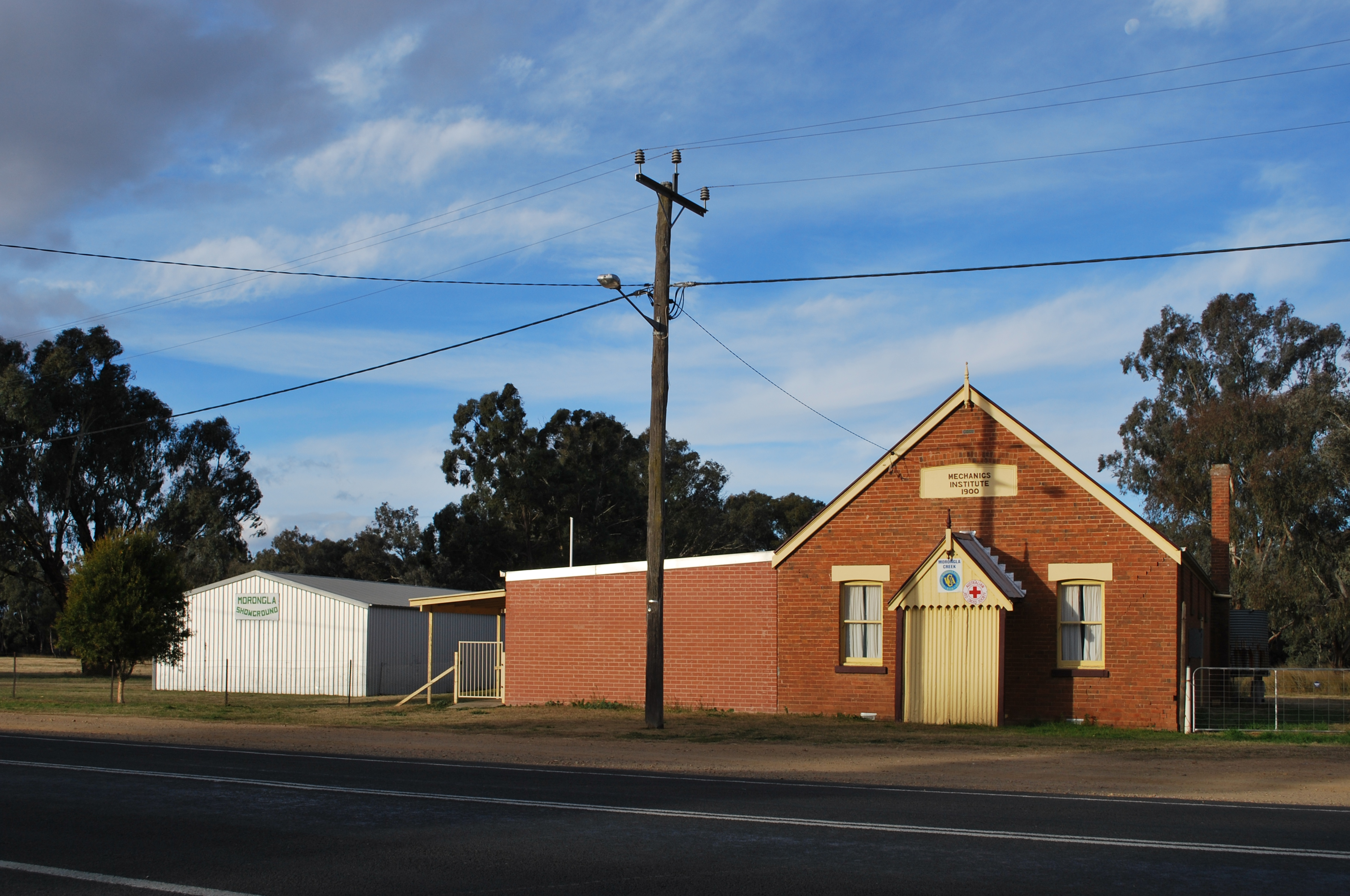
- Mechanics Institute and showgrounds
- Interactive map of Morongla Creek
- Coordinates: 33°57′10″S 148°40′44″E
- Country: Australia
- State: New South Wales
- Shire: Cowra

Morongla Creek is a small town in Cowra Shire, New South Wales, Australia. It has a population of about 40 people and is 13 km south of Cowra by road. Other nearby districts and/or villages are: Neila Creek, Cocomingla, Cucumgilliga, Wattamondara, Koorawatha and Noonbinna.

Just south of the village is Mount Stumbler, a local landmark. Near its base was Conlon's Swamp which, though now largely displaced by a farm dam, reappears in vestigial form following heavy rains.

The creek after which the town is named rises near Mount Morris and Slatterys Hill and runs in a generally northward direction for about 30 km before joining the Lachlan River near Cowra. It runs along the eastern boundary of the village showground.

The Morongla Show, originally known as the Morongla Carnival, is an annual event held on Labour Day each October. Attractions include a Gymkhana, Iron Woman and Iron Man contests, and competitive displays of local produce. Afternoon tea is provided in the Mechanics’ Institute Hall. The 100th anniversary of the Morongla Show is being celebrated in 2019.

The two Honour Rolls in the Mechanics’ Institute hall bear the names of men and women from the district who served in both World Wars.

Morongla Creek village once had a much larger population with a post office, stores and other services. Athur Ambrose Marks operated a blacksmiths and general store from 1911 to 1916. Ben Cannon operated the smithy through the 1920s and 1930s. The general store was later operated by Tom Middlemiss, selling everything from mousetraps to tractors, until it was burned down during WW2 when his sister tripped while carrying a lighted kerosene lantern. In the late 1960s Saint Daniel's Catholic Church also burnt down.

The annual Working Sheepdog Trials are held at the Morongla showground in August.
