= Local government areas of New South Wales =

New South Wales LGAs by largest council faction as of December 2022.

This is a list of local government areas (LGAs) in New South Wales, sorted by region. As of September 2024 there were 128 local government areas in New South Wales, there are 33 local government areas in Greater Sydney and 95 local government areas amongst 12 regions of Regional New South Wales. All councils are listed below in alphabetical order by region. There is also the Unincorporated Far West Region which is not part of any local government area, in the sparsely inhabited Far West, and Lord Howe Island, which is also unincorporated but self-governed by the Lord Howe Island Board.

Norfolk Island Regional Council is also subject to the state-level legislation of New South Wales.

Local elections are held in New South Wales every four years. The most recent elections were held in September 2024.

== Maps ==
Map of LGAs in New South Wales

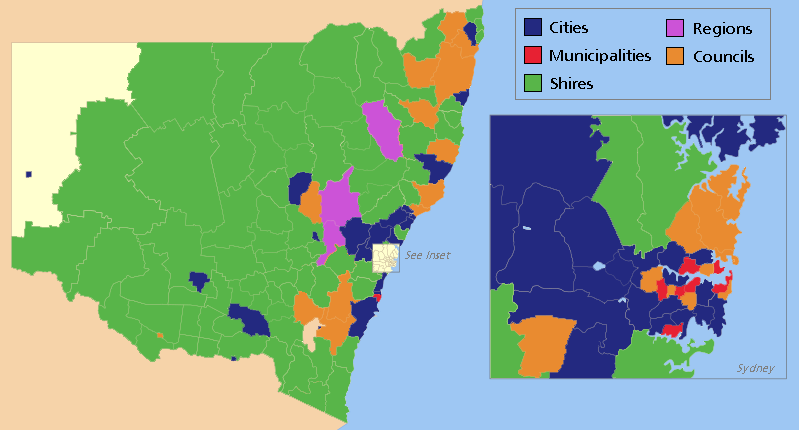
Types and titles of LGAs in New South Wales

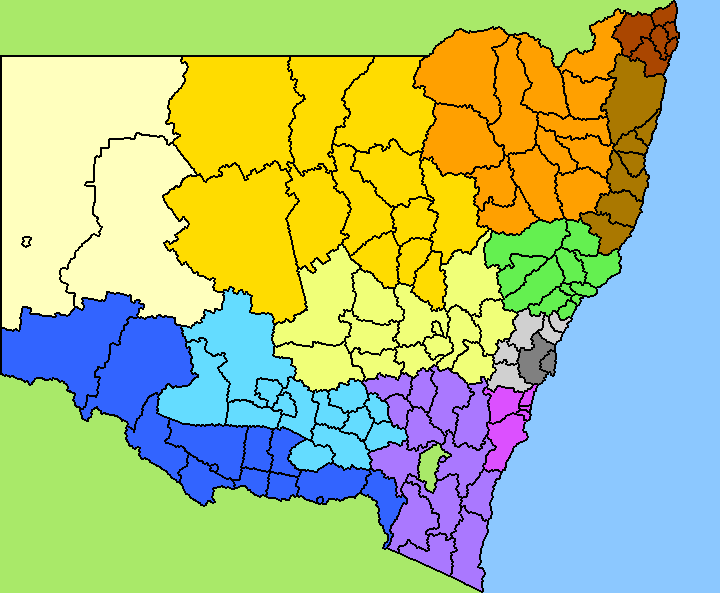
LGA regions in New South Wales

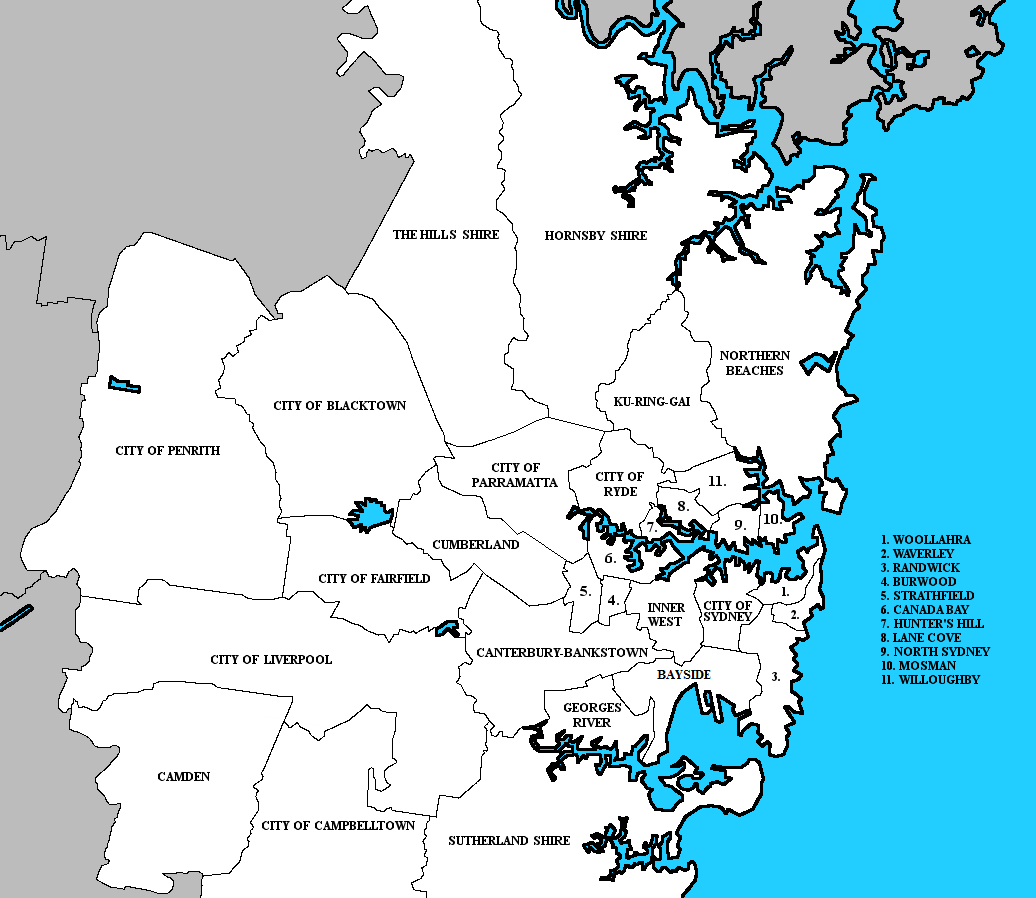
LGAs in Greater Sydney

== Metropolitan LGAs ==
=== Greater Sydney ===
Local government area	Date established		Area			Population		Map	Council Seat
Local government area	Borough / District / Municipality / Shire	City	km^{2}	sq mi	Rank	2021	Rank	Map	Council Seat
Metropolitan Sydney Local Government Areas
Bayside Council	13 January 1871 (as Rockdale Municipality); 29 March 1888 (as Borough of Botany)	9 September 2016	50	19	113	176,061	17		Rockdale Town Hall
Blacktown City Council	6 March 1906 (Shire)	7 March 1979	240	93	103	399,711	1		Blacktown
Burwood, Municipality of	27 March 1874	n/a	7.1	2.7	127	40,397	55		Burwood
Camden Council	6 February 1889	n/a	201	78	104	119,951	24		Oran Park
Campbelltown, City of	21 January 1882	4 May 1968	312	120	97	177,689	16		Campbelltown
Canada Bay, City of	11 August 1883 (Municipal District of Concord); 18 January 1890 (Borough of Drummoyne)	December 2000	20	7.7	120	89,667	29		Drummoyne
Canterbury-Bankstown, City of	17 March 1879 (Municipal District of Canterbury); 7 September 1895 (Municipal District of Bankstown)	12 May 2016	110	42	108	372,322	2		Bankstown
Cumberland City Council	9 July 1872 (as the Prospect and Sherwood Municipal District)	12 May 2016	72	28	112	236,996	6		Merrylands
Fairfield City Council	11 December 1888 (as the Smithfield and Fairfield Municipal District)	18 May 1979	102	39	109	209,030	13		Wakeley
Georges River Council	22 December 1885 (as the Kogarah Municipality); 25 March 1887 (Municipal District of Hurstville)	12 May 2016	38	15	115	152,703	19		Hurstville
Hornsby Shire	6 March 1906	n/a	455	176	92	152,225	20		Hornsby
Hunter's Hill, Municipality of	7 January 1861	n/a	5.7	2.2	128	13,591	80		Hunters Hill
Inner West Council	1 November 1861 (Municipality of Marrickville); 28 December 1871 (Borough of Ashfield); 29 December 1871 (Municipal District of Leichhardt)	12 May 2016	35	14	117	183,772	15		Ashfield, Leichhardt, Petersham
Ku-ring-gai Council	1906 (Shire) 1928 (Municipality)	n/a	85	33	110	124,659	23		Gordon
Lane Cove Council	11 February 1895 (Borough of Lane Cove)	n/a	11	4.2	123	39,601	56		Lane Cove
Liverpool, City of	27 June 1872 (Municipal District)	9 November 1960	306	118	99	234,373	7		Liverpool
Mosman Council	11 April 1893 (as Borough of Mosman)	n/a	8.7	3.4	126	28,461	62		Mosman
North Sydney Council	31 July 1890 (as Borough of North Sydney)	n/a	11	4.2	123	69,460	36		North Sydney Council Chambers
Northern Beaches Council	6 January 1877 (Manly Municipality); 7 March 1906 (as Warringah Shire); 1 May 1992 (as Pittwater Municipality)	12 May 2016	254	98	102	264,481	4		Dee Why
Parramatta, City of	27 November 1861 (Municipality)	12 May 2016	84	32	111	258,315	5		Parramatta Town Hall
Penrith, City of	12 May 1871 (Municipality)	21 October 1959	405	156	93	219,149	9		Penrith
Randwick, City of	23 February 1859	1 July 1990	36	14	116	135,275	21		Randwick Town Hall
Ryde, City of	12 November 1870 (Municipal district)	1 January 1992	41	16	114	129,773	22		Ryde
Strathfield, Municipality of	2 June 1885	n/a	14	5.4	121	45,930	50		Strathfield
Sutherland Shire	6 March 1906	n/a	334	129	96	230,903	8		Sutherland
Sydney, City of	n/a	20 July 1842	27	10	118	214,851	10		Sydney Town Hall
The Hills Shire	6 March 1906 (as Baulkham Hills Shire)	n/a	386	149	95	192,509	14		Norwest
Waverley Council	16 June 1859	n/a	9.4	3.6	125	69,388	37		Bondi Junction
Willoughby, City of	23 October 1865	17 November 1989	22	8.5	119	76,034	34		Chatswood
Woollahra, Municipality of	20 April 1860	n/a	12	4.6	122	53,891	47		Double Bay
Outer Metropolitan Sydney Local Government Areas
Blue Mountains, City of	4 January 1889 (as the Municipality of Katoomba)	1 October 1947	1,431	553	82	78,360	32		Katoomba
Hawkesbury, City of	1843 (as Windsor District Council)	1 January 1981	2,775	1,071	69	67,581	39		Windsor
Wollondilly Shire	6 March 1906	n/a	2,555	986	71	54,176	46		Picton

== Regional LGAs ==
=== Northern ===
==== Central Coast ====
Local government area	Date established		Area			Population		Map	Council Seat
Local government area	Municipality / Shire	City	km^{2}	mi^{2}	Rank	2021	Rank	Map	Council Seat
Central Coast Council	11 November 1886 (as Borough of Gosford); 1 January 1947 (as Wyong Shire)	12 May 2016	1,681	649	78	348,379	3		Gosford, Wyong

==== Hunter ====
Local government area	Date established		Area			Population		Map	Council Seat
Local government area	Municipality / Shire	City	km^{2}	mi^{2}	Rank	2021	Rank	Map	Council Seat
Greater Newcastle Local Government Areas
Cessnock, City of	7 March 1906 (Shire)	n/a	1,965	759	76	64,082	40		Cessnock
Lake Macquarie, City of	7 March 1906 (Shire) 1 April 1977 (Municipality)	7 September 1984	649	251	89	213,967	12		Speers Point
Maitland, City of	12 March 1862 (as Municipality of East Maitland)	7 December 1945	392	151	94	90,553	28		Maitland
Newcastle, City of	8 June 1859 (Municipality)	26 January 1848	187	72	105	169,317	18		Newcastle
Port Stephens Council	7 March 1906 (Shire)	n/a	858	331	87	75,282	35		Raymond Terrace
Other Hunter Local Government Areas
Dungog Shire	16 May 1893	n/a	2,250	870	73	9,525	91		Dungog
Muswellbrook Shire	13 April 1870 (Municipal District of Musclebrook)	n/a	3,405	1,315	61	16,463	75		Muswellbrook
Singleton Council	2 February 1866 (Municipality)	n/a	4,893	1,889	46	24,719	65		Singleton
Upper Hunter Shire	26 May 2004	n/a	8,096	3,126	29	14,254	78		Scone

==== Mid North Coast ====
Local government area	Date established		Area			Population		Map	Council Seat
Local government area	Municipality / Shire	City	km^{2}	mi^{2}	Rank	2021	Rank	Map	Council Seat
Bellingen Shire	30 November 1956	n/a	1,600	620	79	13,197	81		Bellingen
Coffs Harbour, City of	30 November 1956 (Shire)	1 May 1987	1,174	453	85	78,738	31		Coffs Harbour
Kempsey Shire	11 June 1886 (Borough)	n/a	3,376	1,303	62	30,816	60		Kempsey
MidCoast Council	7 March 1906 (as Gloucester Shire); 7 March 1906 (Municipality of Great Lakes); 1 January 1981 (Borough of Taree)	12 May 2016	10,054	3,882	19	96,425	27		Gloucester, Forster, Taree
Nambucca Valley Council	15 December 1915	n/a	1,491	576	81	20,375	70		Macksville
Port Macquarie-Hastings Council	13 July 2005; 1 January 1881 (Municipality of Hastings)	n/a	3,682	1,422	56	86,585	30		Port Macquarie
Lord Howe Island	1913 (Board of Control), 1954 (Board)	n/a	15	5.8	n/a	445	n/a		N/A

==== New England ====
Local government area	Date established	Area			Population		Map	Council Seat
Local government area	Date established	km^{2}	mi^{2}	Rank	2021	Rank	Map	Council Seat
Armidale Regional Council	12 May 2016	8,621	3,329	26	29,332	61		Armidale
Glen Innes Severn Council	15 September 2004; 17 June 1872 (Municipal District of Glen Innes)	5,480	2,120	41	8,922	95		Glen Innes
Gunnedah Shire	19 September 1885 (Municipal District)	4,987	1,925	45	13,085	82		Gunnedah
Gwydir Shire	17 March 2004	9,260	3,580	22	4,911	112		Bingara
Inverell Shire	5 March 1872 (Municipal District)	8,597	3,319	27	17,919	72		Inverell
Liverpool Plains Shire	17 March 2004	5,082	1,962	44	7,608	99		Quirindi
Moree Plains Shire	5 December 1890 (Municipal District of Moree)	17,907	6,914	9	12,961	83		Moree
Narrabri Shire	28 September 1895 (Municipal District of West Narrabri)	13,015	5,025	13	12,809	85		Narrabri
Tamworth Regional Council	17 March 2004 (as Peel Regional)	9,884	3,816	21	63,652	41		Tamworth
Tenterfield Shire	23 November 1871 (Municipal District)	7,323	2,827	31	6,798	102		Tenterfield
Uralla Shire	24 April 1882 (Municipal District)	3,227	1,246	63	5,993	107		Uralla
Walcha Shire	1 June 1955	6,261	2,417	36	3,018	120		Walcha

==== Northern Rivers ====
Local government area	Date established		Area			Population		Map	Council Seat
Local government area	Municipality / Shire	City	km^{2}	mi^{2}	Rank	2021	Rank	Map	Council Seat
Ballina Shire	1 January 1977	n/a	485	187	91	46,172	49		Ballina
Byron Shire	6 March 1906	n/a	566	219	90	36,077	57		Mullumbimby
Clarence Valley Council	25 February 2004	n/a	10,429	4,027	18	54,180	45		Grafton, Maclean
Kyogle Council	6 March 1906 (Shire)	n/a	3,584	1,384	58	9,344	93		Kyogle
Lismore, City of	1879 (Municipality)	9 September 1946	1,288	497	84	44,344	51		Goonellabah
Richmond Valley Council	February 2000	n/a	3,047	1,176	65	23,589	66		Casino
Tweed Shire	1 January 1947	n/a	1,308	505	83	97,151	26		Murwillumbah

=== Southern ===
==== Illawarra (Greater Wollongong) ====
Local government area	Date established		Area			Population		Map	Council Seat
Local government area	Municipality / Shire	City	km^{2}	mi^{2}	Rank	2021	Rank	Map	Council Seat
Kiama, Municipality of	11 August 1859 (Municipality)	n/a	258	100	101	22,961	67		Kiama
Shellharbour, City of	4 June 1859 (Municipality)	May 1996	147	57	107	76,443	33		Shellharbour City Centre
Wollongong, City of	24 August 1843 (as Illawarra District Council)	11 September 1942	684	264	88	214,657	11		Wollongong

==== South Coast ====
Local government area	Date established		Area			Population		Map	Council Seat
Local government area	Municipality / Shire	City	km^{2}	mi^{2}	Rank	2021	Rank	Map	Council Seat
Bega Valley Shire	1981	n/a	6,279	2,424	35	35,761	58		Bega
Eurobodalla Shire	17 November 1913	n/a	3,428	1,324	59	40,453	54		Moruya
Shoalhaven, City of	1 July 1948 (Shire)	13 July 1979	4,567	1,763	50	108,497	25		Nowra

==== Southern Highlands ====
Local government area	Date established	Area			Population		Map	Council Seat
Local government area	Date established	km^{2}	mi^{2}	Rank	2021	Rank	Map	Council Seat
Wingecarribee Shire	1 January 1981	2,689	1,038	70	52,456	48		Moss Vale

==== Southern Tablelands ====
Local government area	Date established	Area			Population		Map	Council Seat
Local government area	Date established	km^{2}	mi^{2}	Rank	2021	Rank	Map	Council Seat
Goulburn Mulwaree Council	11 February 2004	3,220	1,240	64	32,138	59		Goulburn
Hilltops Council	12 May 2016	7,141	2,757	32	19,216	71		Boorowa, Harden, Young
Queanbeyan–Palerang Regional Council	12 May 2016	5,319	2,054	42	63,364	42		Queanbeyan
Snowy Monaro Regional Council	12 May 2016	15,164	5,855	10	21,659	68		Cooma
Upper Lachlan Shire	17 March 2004	7,127	2,752	33	8,491	97		Crookwell
Yass Valley Council	1 January 1980 (Shire); 11 February 2004 (Municipality)	3,995	1,542	53	17,234	74		Yass

=== Western ===
==== Central West ====
Local government area	Date established		Area			Population		Map	Council Seat
Local government area	Municipality / Shire	City	km^{2}	mi^{2}	Rank	2021	Rank	Map	Council Seat
Bathurst Regional Council	26 May 2004	n/a	3,818	1,474	55	43,653	53		Bathurst
Blayney Shire	1 November 1882	n/a	1,525	589	80	7,508	100		Blayney
Cabonne Shire	1 October 1977	n/a	6,022	2,325	37	13,760	79		Molong
Cowra Shire	1980	n/a	2,829	1,092	67	12,753	87		Cowra
Forbes Shire	4 June 1870 (as Municipal District)	n/a	4,710	1,820	49	9,383	92		Forbes
Lachlan Shire	6 March 1906	n/a	14,964	5,778	11	6,149	105		Condobolin
Lithgow, City of	4 June 1889 (Municipality)	21 December 1945	4,512	1,742	51	20,854	69		Lithgow
Mid-Western Regional Council	26 May 2004	n/a	8,752	3,379	25	25,704	64		Mudgee
Oberon Shire	6 March 1906	n/a	3,625	1,400	57	5,564	110		Oberon
Orange, City of	9 January 1860 (Municipality)	10 July 1946	284	110	100	43,736	52		Orange
Parkes Shire	1 March 1883 (as Municipal District)	n/a	5,958	2,300	38	14,453	77		Parkes
Weddin Shire	6 March 1906	n/a	3,415	1,319	60	3,589	117		Grenfell

==== Far West ====
Local government area	Date established		Area			Population		Map	Council Seat
Local government area	Municipality / Shire	City	km^{2}	mi^{2}	Rank	2021	Rank	Map	Council Seat
Broken Hill, City of	n/a	24 September 1888	170	66	106	17,661	73		Council Chambers, Broken Hill
Central Darling Shire	20 March 1959; 6 February 1883 (as Municipal District of Wilcannia)	n/a	53,492	20,653	1	1,760	127		Wilcannia
Unincorporated Far West	n/a		93,199	35,984	n/a	575	n/a		N/A

==== Murray ====
Local government area	Date established		Area			Population		Map	Council Seat
Local government area	Municipality / Shire	City	km^{2}	mi^{2}	Rank	2021	Rank	Map	Council Seat
Albury, City of	4 June 1859 (as Municipality)	1946	306	118	98	56,036	43		Albury
Balranald Shire	27 September 1882	n/a	21,691	8,375	6	2,207	126		Balranald
Berrigan Shire	6 March 1906	n/a	2,066	798	74	8,612	96		Berrigan
Edward River Council	1907 (as Conargo Shire); 16 December 1868 (as Deniliquin Council)	12 May 2016	8,884	3,430	24	8,437	98		Deniliquin
Federation Council	1955 (as Corowa Shire); 1906 (as Urana Shire)	12 May 2016	5,685	2,195	40	12,821	84		Corowa
Greater Hume Shire	26 May 2004	n/a	5,750	2,220	39	11,105	90		Holbrook
Murray River Council	12 May 2016	n/a	11,864	4,581	15	12,780	86		Moama
Wentworth Shire	23 January 1879 (Municipality) and (Shire)	n/a	26,256	10,137	4	7,487	101		Wentworth

==== Orana ====
Local government area	Date established	Area			Population		Map	Council Seat
Local government area	Date established	km^{2}	mi^{2}	Rank	2021	Rank	Map	Council Seat
Bogan Shire	17 February 1891 (Municipality) 7 May 1906 (Shire)	14,600	5,600	12	2,481	124		Nyngan
Bourke Shire	4 July 1878	41,600	16,100	3	2,417	125		Bourke
Brewarrina Shire	15 January 1901	19,164	7,399	7	1,488	128		Brewarrina
Cobar Shire	18 March 1884	45,579	17,598	2	4,098	115		Cobar
Coonamble Shire	3 May 1880	9,916	3,829	20	3,834	116		Coonamble
Dubbo Regional Council	12 May 2016	7,535	2,909	30	55,518	44		Dubbo
Gilgandra Shire	6 March 1906	4,832	1,866	47	4,319	114		Gilgandra
Narromine Shire	23 April 1898	5,262	2,032	43	6,448	104		Narromine
Walgett Shire	6 March 1906	22,308	8,613	5	5,590	109		Walgett
Warren Shire	24 April 1895	10,754	4,152	17	2,586	123		Warren
Warrumbungle Shire	25 August 2004	12,372	4,777	14	9,254	94		Coonabarabran

==== Riverina ====
Local government area	Date established		Area			Population		Map	Council Seat
Local government area	Municipality / Shire	City	km^{2}	mi^{2}	Rank	2021	Rank	Map	Council Seat
Bland Shire	6 March 1906	n/a	8,558	3,304	28	5,542	111		West Wyalong
Carrathool Shire	27 October 1943	n/a	18,935	7,311	8	2,871	122		Goolgowi
Coolamon Shire	6 March 1906	n/a	2,431	939	73	4,401	113		Coolamon
Cootamundra-Gundagai Regional Council	1 April 1975 (as Cootamundra Shire); 1 January 1924 (as Gundagai Shire)	12 May 2016	3,981	1,537	54	11,387	89		Cootamundra, Gundagai
Griffith, City of	6 January 1928	1 January 1982	1,639	633	78	27,182	63		Griffith
Hay Shire	1 January 1965 10 June 1872 (as Municipality)	n/a	11,326	4,373	16	2,883	121		Hay
Junee Shire	26 July 1886 (Borough)	n/a	2,030	780	75	6,450	103		Junee
Leeton Shire	20 December 1927 (Willimbong Shire)	n/a	1,167	451	86	11,481	88		Leeton
Lockhart Shire	6 March 1906	n/a	2,896	1,118	66	3,328	119		Lockhart
Murrumbidgee Council	12 May 2016	n/a	6,881	2,657	34	3,564	118		Darlington Point, Jerilderie
Narrandera Shire	1 January 1960	n/a	4,116	1,589	52	5,731	108		Narrandera
Snowy Valleys Council	12 May 2016	n/a	8,959	3,459	23	14,901	76		Tumut, Tumbarumba
Temora Shire	1 January 1981	n/a	2,802	1,082	68	6,012	106		Temora
Wagga Wagga, City of	15 March 1870 (Borough)	1 January 1981	4,825	1,863	48	67,860	38		Wagga Wagga

== Lord Mayoralties ==
There are four councils in NSW whose office of Mayor has been elevated to Lord Mayor. The process requires that the Premier of the day write to the reigning monarch to request the ascent.

Local Government Area	Year of Royal Assent	Incumbent	Term start	Map
City of Sydney	1930	Clover Moore	27 March 2004	
City of Newcastle	1948	Nuatali Nelmes	15 November 2014	
City of Wollongong	10 April 1970	Tania Brown	14 September 2024	
City of Parramatta	12 December 1988	Pierre Esber	25 September 2023	

== See also ==
- List of local government areas in New South Wales
- Local government in Australia
- NSW Regional Organisations of Councils
