= Bland Shire =

- Local government area
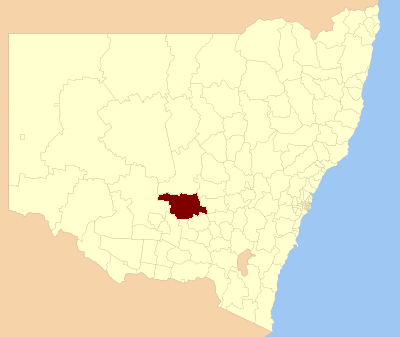
- Location in New South Wales

- Interactive map of Bland Shire
- Coordinates: 33°56′S 147°15′E
- Country: Australia
- State: New South Wales
- Region: New South Wales Riverina
- Council seat: West Wyalong

Government
  - Mayor: Brian Monaghan (Independent)
  - State electorate: Cootamundra
  - Federal division: Parkes

Area
  - Total: 8,560 km^{2} (3,310 sq mi)

Population
  - Totals: 5,995 (2016 census); 5,985 (2018 est.)
  - Density: 0.7004/km^{2} (1.8139/sq mi)
- Website: Bland Shire
LGAs around Bland Shire
Carrathool	Lachlan	Forbes
Carrathool	Bland Shire	Weddin
Griffith	Narrandera	Temora

Bland Shire is a local government area in the Riverina region of New South Wales, Australia. it covers an area of 8,560 square kilometres (3,310 sq mi). As at the 2016 census the population was 5,995. It is a member of the League of Extraordinary Communities which was established by Dull, Perth and Kinross, Scotland; and Boring, Oregon, US.

The major economic activities of the shire are agriculture, mining, transport, tourism and wholesale distribution.

== History ==
The farm community of Bland Shire was a former gold prospecting site in the Riverina region, centred on West Wyalong.

Bland Shire was proclaimed on 6 March 1906. The shire was named in honour of William Bland.

In 1935 Bland Shire absorbed the Municipality of Wyalong local government area.

== Location and settlements ==
Bland Shire is located on the boundary between the central west and Riverina regions. The area is adjacent to the Newell and Mid-Western highways.

The largest town and council seat is West Wyalong. The region also includes the towns of Wyalong, Barmedman, Tallimba, Ungarie, Weethalle and Mirrool. The major economic activities of the shire are agriculture, mining, transport, tourism and wholesale distribution.

=== Twin towns ===
In 2013, the community joined Dull in Perthshire, Scotland and Boring in Oregon, US to create a "League of Extraordinary Communities" to group Dull, Boring and Bland as a means of encouraging travel, promoting all three communities.

This grouping is not officially a "twin towns" relationship, as Bland is a shire, Dull is a village, and Boring is a town, and all three have very different population sizes.

== Climate ==
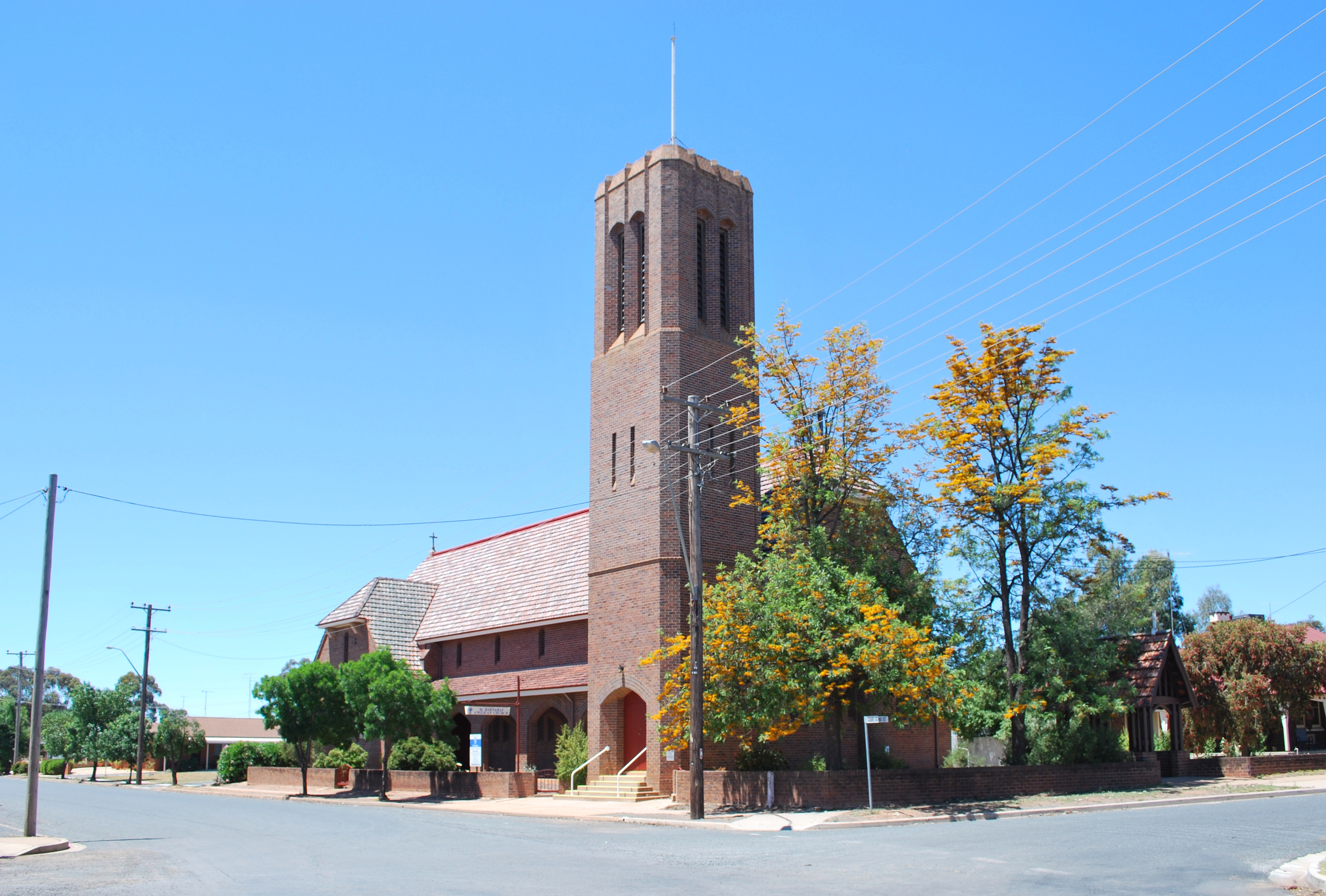
West Wyalong Anglican Church

Average annual rainfall is 480 millimetres (19 in). Average temperature are: maximum 23.3 °C (73.9 °F), minimum 9.5 °C (49.1 °F). The prevailing wind direction is north east in the morning and south west in the afternoon and evening, with predominantly calm conditions.

== Topography, flora and fauna, and geology ==
Topography is generally undulating or flat, with the altitude ranging from 200 to 486 metres (656–1,594 ft).

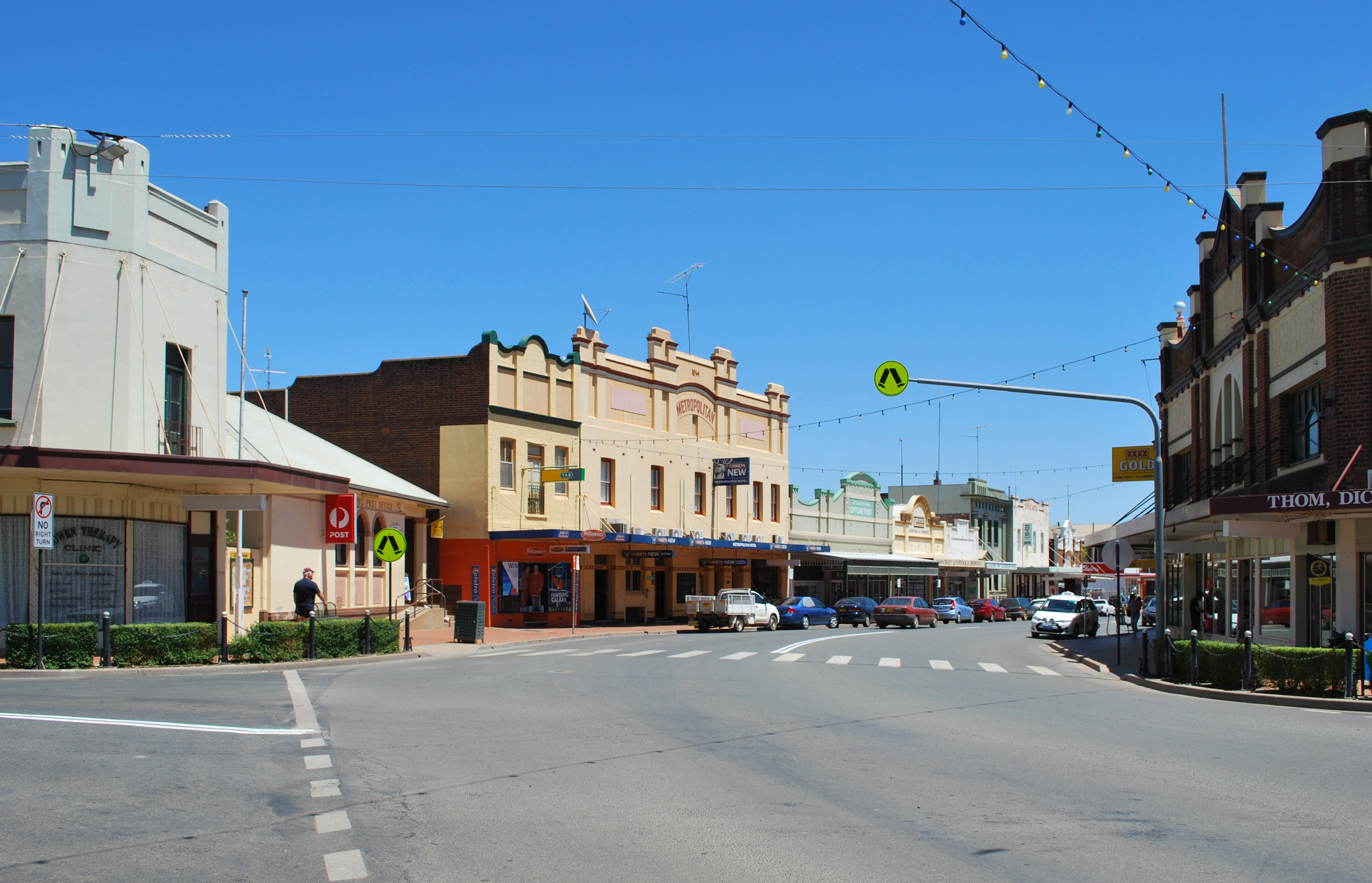
The main street of West Wyalong

Main tree species include: kurrajong, cypress pine, mallee, box, ironbark, belah and wilga. Native pasture plants include: wallaby grasses, Queensland blue grass and plains and wire grass. Native fauna include: water fowl, red and grey kangaroos, echidnas, goannas, possums, bats and mallee fowls.

Soil are predominantly clay with some granite soil and red brown earth, mostly neutral in pH.

== Council ==
=== Current composition and election method ===
Bland Shire Council is composed of nine councillors elected proportionally as a single ward. All councillors are elected for a fixed four-year term of office. The mayor is elected by the councillors at the first meeting of the council. The most recent election was held on 4 December 2021, and the make-up of the council is as follows:

Party	Councillors
Independents	8
Independent Labor	1
Total	9

The current Council, elected in 2021, in order of election, is:

Councillor	Party	Notes
Kerron Keatley	Unaligned	
Elizabeth McGlynn	Unaligned	
Brian Monaghan	Independent	Mayor
Rodney Crowe	Unaligned	Deputy Mayor
Roger Moore	Independent	
Tony Lord	Independent Labor	
Jill Funnell	Unaligned	
Monica Clark	Unaligned	
Bruce Baker	Unaligned	

== Election results ==
=== 2024 ===
2024 New South Wales local elections: Bland
Party	Candidate	Votes	%	±%
Independent	Brian Monaghan (elected)	729	22.4	−6.0
Independent	Holly Brooks (elected)	364	11.2	
Independent	Elizabeth McGlynn (elected)	324	10.0	−2.4
Independent	Emma Henderson (elected)	311	9.6	
Independent National	Lisa Minogue (elected)	306	9.4	
Independent	Rodney Crowe (elected)	264	8.1	−2.5
Independent	Malcolm Carnegie (elected)	189	5.8	
Independent	Mark Hoskinson	176	5.4	
Independent Labor	Tony Lord (elected)	159	4.9	−1.4
Independent	Jill Funnell (elected)	138	4.3	−2.0
Independent	Roger Moore	117	3.6	−4.4
Independent	Glenda Tasker	63	1.9	
Independent	Alan McGlynn	55	1.7	
Independent	Bradley Staniforth	53	1.6	−2.3
Total formal votes		3,248	96.3	
Informal votes		126	3.7	
Turnout		3,374	81.7	

=== 2021 ===
2021 New South Wales local elections: Bland
Party	Candidate	Votes	%	±%
Independent	Brian Monaghan (elected)	913	28.4	
Independent	Elizabeth McGlynn (elected)	405	12.6	
Independent	Kerron Keatley (elected)	399	12.4	
Independent	Rodney Crowe (elected)	339	10.6	
Independent	Roger Moore (elected)	256	8.0	
Independent	Jill Funnell (elected)	201	6.3	
Independent Labor	Tony Lord (elected)	201	6.3	
Independent	Bruce Baker (elected)	196	6.1	
Independent	Monica Clark (elected)	176	5.5	
Independent	Bradley Staniforth	125	3.9	
Total formal votes		3,211	96.1	
Informal votes		131	3.9	
Turnout		3,342	80.7	

== Demographics ==
Selected historical census data for Bland Shire local government area
Census year		2011	2016
Population	Estimated residents on census night	5,865	▲5,995
Population	LGA rank in terms of size within New South Wales	111th	▲109th
Population	% of New South Wales population		
Population	% of Australian population		
Cultural and language diversity			
Ancestry, top responses	English		
Ancestry, top responses	Australian		
Ancestry, top responses	Italian		
Ancestry, top responses	Chinese		
Ancestry, top responses	Irish		
Language, top responses (other than English)	Italian		
Language, top responses (other than English)	Mandarin		
Language, top responses (other than English)	Cantonese		
Language, top responses (other than English)	Korean		
Language, top responses (other than English)	Greek		
Religious affiliation			
Religious affiliation, top responses	Catholic		
Religious affiliation, top responses	No religion		
Religious affiliation, top responses	Anglican		
Religious affiliation, top responses	Eastern Orthodox		
Religious affiliation, top responses	Buddhism		
Median weekly incomes			
Personal income	Median weekly personal income	A$	
Personal income	% of Australian median income		
Family income	Median weekly family income		
Family income	% of Australian median income		
Household income	Median weekly household income		
Household income	% of Australian median income		
