= Cowra Shire =

- Local government area
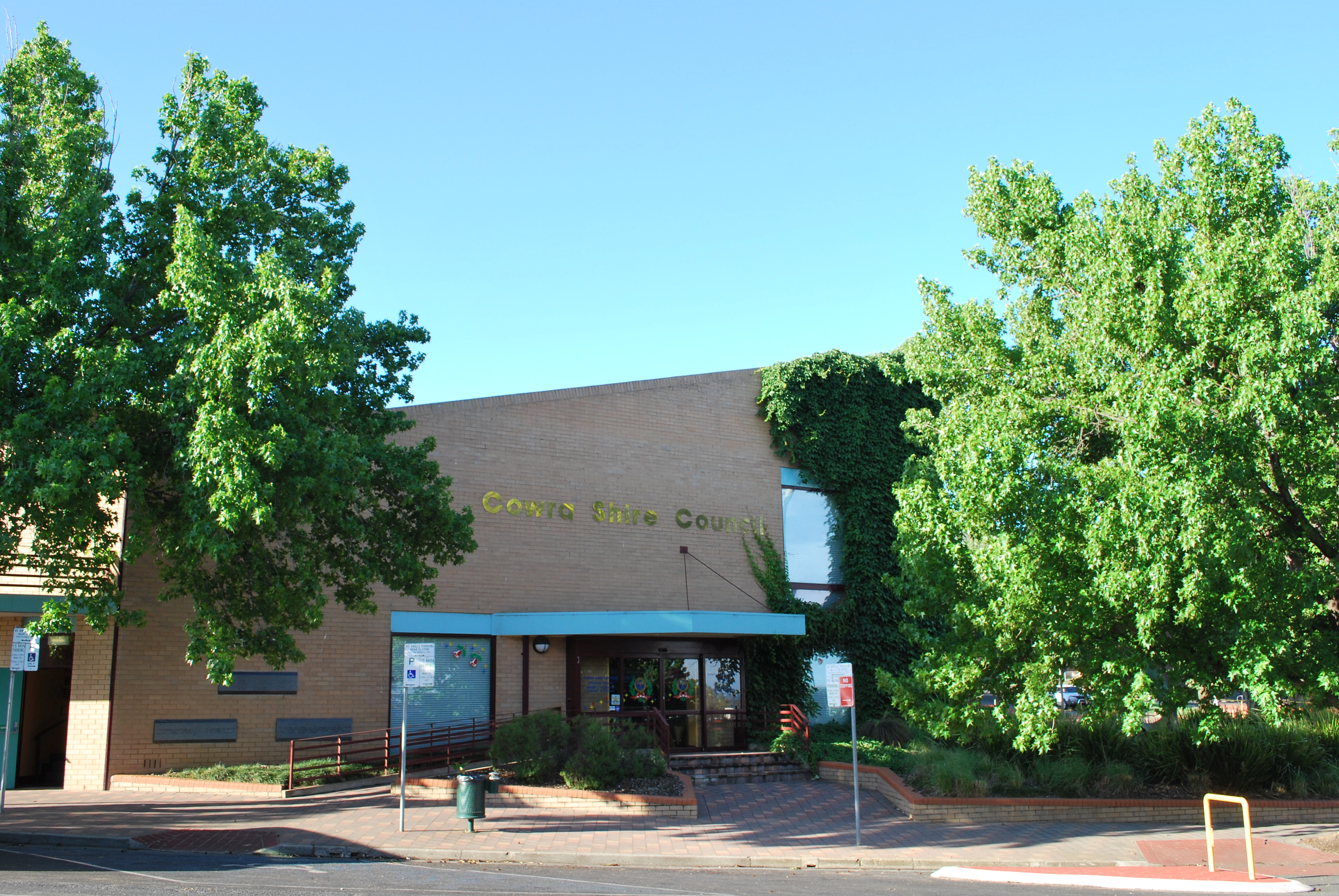
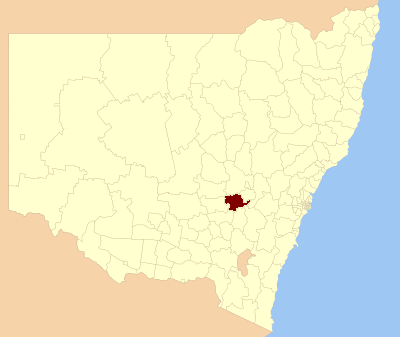
- Shire offices in Cowra Location in New South Wales

- Interactive map of Cowra Shire
- Coordinates: 33°49′S 148°44′E
- Country: Australia
- State: New South Wales
- Region: Central West
- Established: 1980
- Council seat: Cowra

Government
  - Mayor: Paul Smith
  - State electorate: Cootamundra
  - Federal division: Riverina

Area
  - Total: 2,810 km^{2} (1,080 sq mi)

Population
  - Total: 12,724 (2021 census)
  - Density: 4.528/km^{2} (11.728/sq mi)
- Website: Cowra Shire
LGAs around Cowra Shire
| Forbes | Cabonne | Blayney |
| Weddin | Cowra Shire | Bathurst |
| Hilltops | Hilltops | Upper Lachlan |

The Cowra Shire is a local government area in the Central West region of New South Wales, Australia. The Shire is located adjacent to the Lachlan River, the Mid-Western Highway and the Lachlan Valley Way.

The largest town and council seat is Cowra. The municipality also has a number of small villages: Billimari, Darbys Falls, Gooloogong, Morongla, Noonbinna, Wattamondara, Woodstock, and Wyangala.

The mayor of Cowra Shire Council is Paul Smith.

== Council ==
Cowra Shire Council has nine councillors elected proportionally as a single ward. All councillors are elected for a fixed four-year term of office. The mayor is elected by the councillors at the first meeting of the council. The most recent by-election was held on 21 December 2021, and the makeup of the council is as follows:

| Party | Councillors |
|---|---|
| Independents and Unaligned | 7 |
| Independent Labor | 1 |
| Independent National | 1 |
| Total | 9 |

The current Council is:

| Councillor | Party | Notes |
|---|---|---|
| Paul Smith | | |
| Nikki Kiss | Independent | |
| Erin Watt | Independent Labor | |
| Cheryl Speechley | | |
| Cheryl Downing | Independent | |
| Peter Wright | Independent | |
| Ruth Fagan | Independent National | |
| Karren Cave | | |
| Tony Horton | | |

== Election results ==
=== 2024 ===
2024 New South Wales local elections: Cowra
| Party | Candidate | Votes | % | ±% |
|---|---|---|---|---|
| Independent | Paul Robert Smith (elected) | unopposed | | |
| Independent | Cheryl Downing (elected) | unopposed | | |
| Independent | Tony Horton (elected) | unopposed | | |
| Independent Labor | Erin Watt (elected) | unopposed | | |
| Independent | Cheryl Speechley (elected) | unopposed | | |
| Independent National | Ruth Fagan (elected) | unopposed | | |
| Independent | Peter Wright (elected) | unopposed | | |
| Independent | Nikki Kiss (elected) | unopposed | | |
| Registered electors | | | | |

=== 2021 ===
2021 New South Wales local elections: Cowra
| Party | Candidate | Votes | % | ±% |
|---|---|---|---|---|
| Independent | Bill West (elected) | 2,132 | 27.5 | |
| Independent | Erin Watt (elected) | 1,138 | 14.7 | |
| Independent | Sharon D'Elboux (elected) | 705 | 9.1 | |
| Independent | Nikki Kiss (elected) | 676 | 8.7 | |
| Independent | Cheryl Downing (elected) | 527 | 6.8 | |
| Independent | Peter Wright (elected) | 428 | 5.5 | |
| Independent | Paul Smith (elected) | 386 | 5.0 | |
| Independent National | Ruth Fagan (elected) | 265 | 3.4 | |
| Independent | Donna Peters | 260 | 3.3 | |
| Independent National | Ian Docker | 235 | 3.0 | |
| Independent | Rodrick Buhr | 230 | 3.0 | |
| Independent | Judi Smith (elected) | 216 | 2.8 | |
| Independent | Michael Nobes | 152 | 2.0 | |
| Independent | Alex Cozadinos | 145 | 1.9 | |
| Independent | Rebecca Morgan | 143 | 1.8 | |
| Independent | Simon Bray | 126 | 1.6 | |
| Total formal votes | | 7,764 | 94.2 | |
| Informal votes | | 480 | 5.8 | |
| Turnout | | 8,244 | 85.0 | |

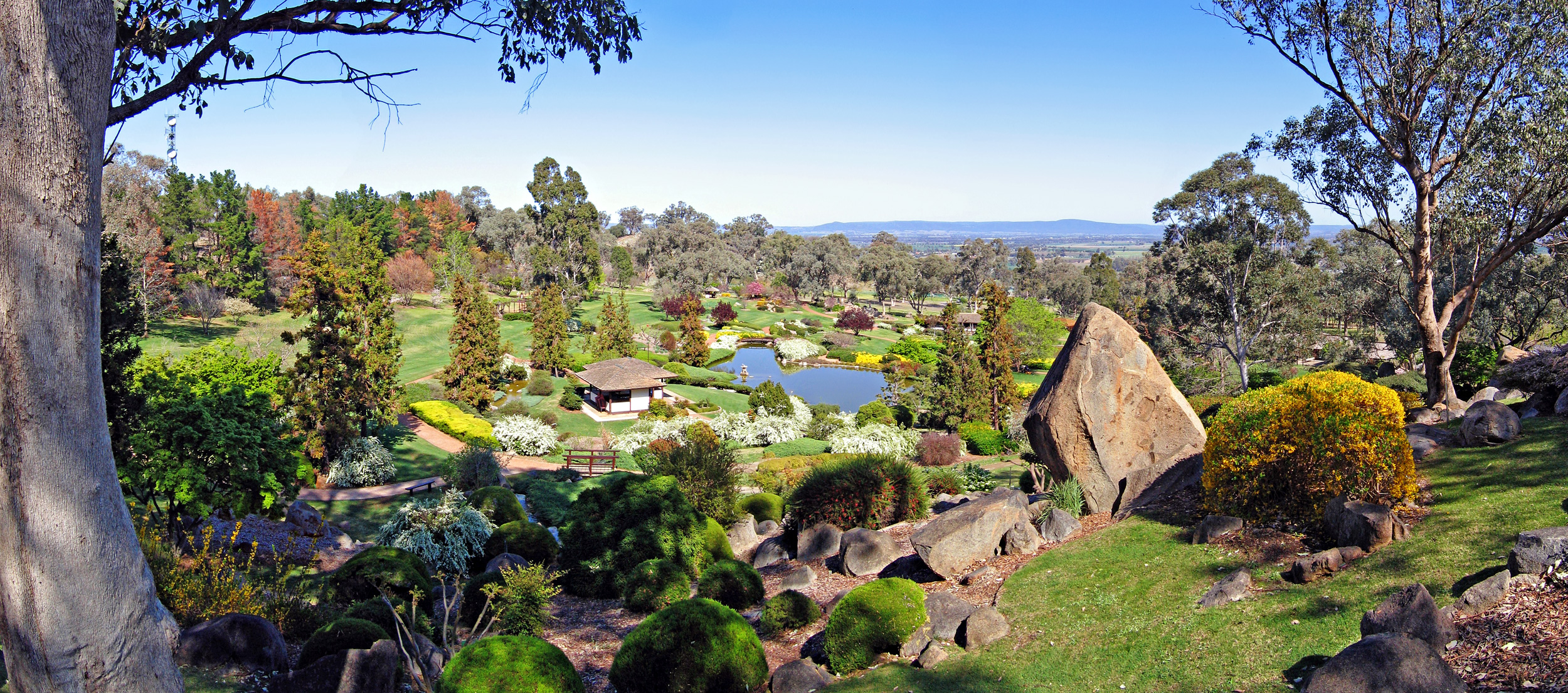
Panoramic view from Cowra Mountain at the Cowra Japanese Garden. The view takes in the gardens and the plains of the Cowra Shire across to the nearby mountains.
