= Forbes Shire =

- Local government area
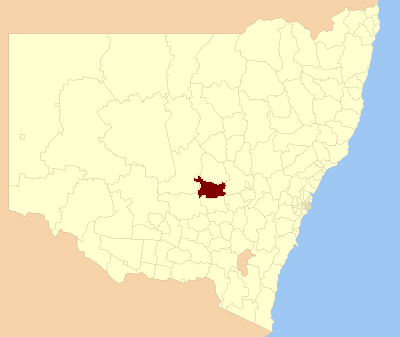
- Location in New South Wales

- Interactive map of Forbes Shire
- Coordinates: 33°22′S 148°00′E
- Country: Australia
- State: New South Wales
- Region: Central West
- Established: 1 January 1981
- Council seat: Forbes

Government
  - Mayor: Phyllis Miller (Independent)
  - State electorate: Orange
  - Federal division: Riverina

Area
  - Total: 4,720 km^{2} (1,820 sq mi)

Population
  - Total: 9,319 (2021 census)
  - Density: 1.9744/km^{2} (5.114/sq mi)
- Website: Forbes Shire
LGAs around Forbes Shire
Lachlan	Parkes	Cabonne
Lachlan	Forbes Shire	Cabonne
Bland	Weddin	Cowra

Forbes Shire is a local government area in the central west region of New South Wales, Australia. The Shire was formed in 1981 from the amalgamation of the Municipality of Forbes and the Shire of Jemalong resulting from the Local Government Areas Amalgamation Act 1980.

In addition to the town of Forbes, the Shire includes the town and villages of Bedgerebong, Bundbarrah, Corradgery, Daroobalgie, Eugowra, Ooma North and Paytens Bridge and Wirrinya.

Since September 2020, the mayor of Forbes Shire Council is Phyllis Miller and Deputy Mayor of Forbes Shire Council is Chris Roylance, who are both unaligned with any political party.

== Council ==
=== Current composition and election method ===
Forbes Shire Council is composed of nine councillors elected proportionally as a single ward. All councillors are elected for a fixed four-year term of office. The mayor is elected by the councillors at the first meeting of the council. The most recent election was held on 4 December 2021, and the makeup of the council is as follows:

Party	Councillors
Independent	8
Independent National	1
Total	9

== Election results ==
=== 2024 ===
2024 New South Wales local elections: Forbes
Party	Candidate	Votes	%	±%
Independent National	Phyllis Miller (elected)	1,828	33.7	−2.9
Independent	Steve Karaitiana (elected)	650	12.0	+1.7
Independent	Aidan Clarke (elected)	635	11.7	+3.7
Independent	Jenny Webb (elected)	507	9.4	−0.7
Independent	Chris Roylance (elected)	382	7.1	+2.4
Independent	Margaret Duggan (elected)	373	6.9	−1.2
Independent	Brian Mattiske (elected)	301	5.6	+2.5
Independent	Sarahlee Sweeney (elected)	283	5.2	
Independent	Michele Herbert (elected)	243	4.5	−2.0
Independent	James Whalan	216	4.0	
Total formal votes		5,418	95.3	−1.8
Informal votes		265	4.7	+1.8
Turnout		5,683	81.6	−1.5

=== 2021 ===
2021 New South Wales local elections: Forbes
Party	Candidate	Votes	%	±%
Independent National	Phyllis Miller (elected)	2,062	36.6	
Independent	Steve Karaitiana (elected)	577	10.3	
Independent	Jenny Webb (elected)	569	10.1	
Independent	Margaret Duggan (elected)	456	8.1	
Independent	Aidan Clarke (elected)	451	8.0	
Independent	Maria Willis (elected)	272	4.8	
Independent	Chris Roylance (elected)	267	4.7	
Independent	Emma Henderson	190	3.4	
Independent	Brian Mattiske (elected)	176	3.1	
Independent	Graeme Miller	164	2.9	
Independent	Thomas Dwyer	160	2.8	
Independent	Michele Herbert (elected)	142	2.5	
Independent	Jeff Nicholson	142	2.5	
Total formal votes		5,628	97.1	
Informal votes		170	2.9	
Turnout		5,798	83.1	
