= Central West (New South Wales) =

- Region
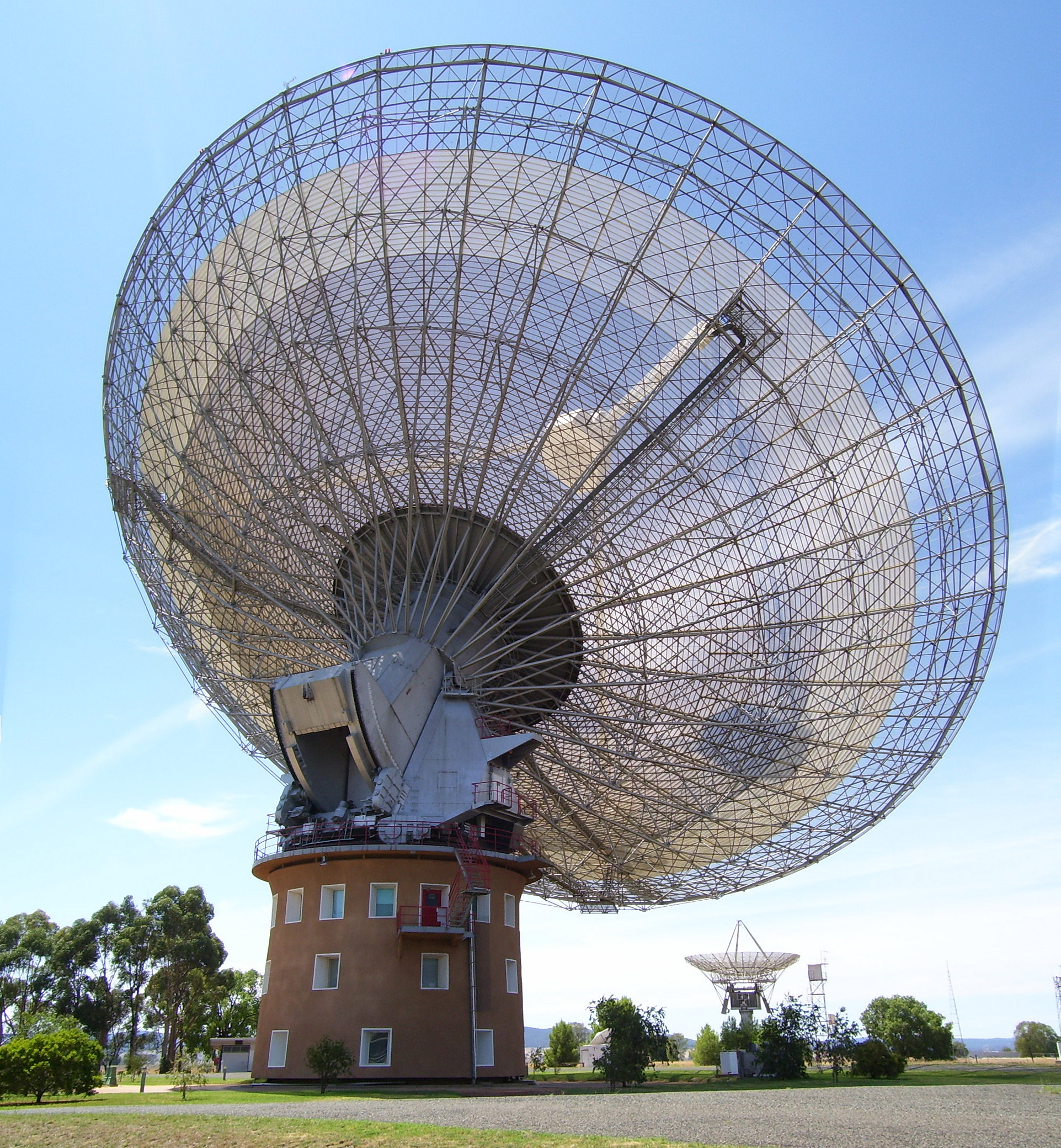
- The CSIRO Radio Telescope at Parkes

- Coordinates: 33°14′S 149°11′E
- Country: Australia
- State: New South Wales
- LGA: Bathurst Regional Council; Blayney Shire; Cabonne Shire; Cowra Shire; Forbes Shire; Lachlan Shire; City of Lithgow; Mid-Western Regional Council; Oberon Shire; City of Orange; Parkes Shire; Weddin Shire
- Location: 200 km (120 mi) W of Sydney

Government
  - State electorates: Bathurst; Cootamundra; Dubbo; Orange; Barwon
  - Federal divisions: Calare; Riverina; Parkes

Area
  - Total: 55,754 km^{2} (21,527 sq mi)

Population
  - Total: 212,962 (2021 census)
  - Density: 3.81967/km^{2} (9.89291/sq mi)
- Time zone: UTC+10 (AEST)
  - Summer (DST): UTC+11 (AEDT)
Regions around Central West
Orana	Upper Hunter	Hunter
Orana	Central West	Blue Mountains (Greater Sydney)
South West Slopes	Riverina	Southern Tablelands

The Central West is a region in central New South Wales, Australia. The region stretches from Lithgow in the east and to as far west as Lake Cargelligo, on the Lachlan River. The Central West is known for its attractions such as the Jenolan Caves, near Oberon and also wineries, as well as rural farmland and natural landscapes. The region includes major towns like Bathurst, Orange, Mudgee, Lithgow, Parkes and Cowra. It has an area of 63,262 square kilometres (24,426 sq mi). The region also includes the sub-region known as the Central Tablelands, located in the eastern part of the region. The region known as the Orana, which includes the area surrounding Dubbo is typically classed as being a part of the Central West also.

Major population and service centres in the Central West include Bathurst, Cowra, Lithgow, Mudgee, Orange, and Parkes. Bathurst and Orange are home to campuses of Charles Sturt University, and Lithgow housing the University of Notre Dame Regional Clinical School.

== Cities and towns ==
The Central West includes the large regional centres of Bathurst and Orange; the towns of Cowra, Mudgee, Lithgow and Parkes; and smaller centres, such as Blayney, Canowindra, Condobolin, Eugowra, Forbes, Grenfell, Gulgong, Kandos, Lake Cargelligo, Millthorpe, Molong, Oberon, Peak Hill, Portland, Rylstone, and Wallerawang.

=== Demography and area ===
The following local government areas are contained within the region:

Population by Local Government Area
Central West rank	Local Government Area	Population as of 30 June 2016	10 year growth rate	Population density (people/km^{2})
1	Bathurst Regional	42,389	14.8	11.1
2	Orange City	41,384	13.8	145.6
3	Mid-Western Regional	24,569	13.5	2.8
4	Lithgow City	21,524	6.6	4.8
5	Parkes Shire	14,946	2.4	2.5
6	Cabonne Shire	13,625	7.8	2.3
7	Cowra Shire	12,673	-0.6	4.5
8	Forbes Shire	9,808	2.8	2.1
9	Blayney Shire	7,418	10.0	4.9
10	Lachlan Shire	6,352	-7.0	0.4
11	Oberon Shire	5,399	4.2	1.5
12	Weddin Shire	3,692	-0.8	1.1
Central West		209,810	8.5	3.0

== Terrain ==
The Central West's east is higher, wetter and hillier and supports orchards, vineyards, vegetable-growing and pastoralism. The west is flatter and drier and supports grain crops and pastoralism.

== Transport ==
The Central West region is traversed by the Great Western Highway, the Mid-Western Highway, the Mitchell Highway, the Newell Highway and the Castlereagh Highway.

Orange Airport is the region's main airport which provides direct flights to Sydney, Melbourne and Brisbane.

The Central West is serviced by Blue Mountains Line trains to Bathurst and NSW TrainLink services to Broken Hill via the Outback Xplorer and Dubbo via the Central West Express.

== Media ==
The Central West has several radio stations, including ABC Central West, 2BS 95.1FM, B-Rock FM, Life Radio AM 1629khz, 97.9 2LVR (a community radio station), 105.1 2GZFM, 105.9 Star FM, Radio 2LT, 107.9 Move FM, 95.5 ROK FM, 107.5 Community Radio, 103.5 Rhema FM and 1089AM — a commercial station that gets most of its programming from 2SM in Sydney. Other electronic media are represented by the Australian Broadcasting Corporation with both television and radio broadcasting; and by television stations Prime7, Nine, and Southern Cross 10.

Two major newspapers are published in the region, the Central Western Daily newspaper is published in Orange and the Western Advocate in Bathurst. Numerous other local papers serve the remaining large towns.

== History ==
The Central West area was originally inhabited by the Wiradjuri people. The first British explorer, George Wilson Evans, entered the Lachlan Valley in 1815. He named the area the Oxley Plains after his superior the surveyor-general, John Oxley. In 1817 he deemed the area unfit for settlement. A Military Depot was established not long after at Soldiers Flat near present-day Billimari. Arthur Ranken and James Sloan, from Bathurst, were amongst the first European settlers on the Lachlan. They moved to the area in 1831.

In the 1850s many gold prospectors passed through headed for gold fields at Lambing Flat (Young) and Grenfell.

== See also ==
- Regions of New South Wales
