= Weddin Shire =

- Local government area
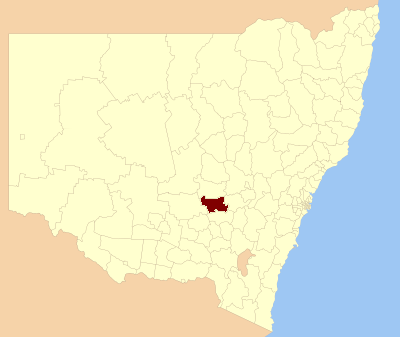
- Location in New South Wales

- Interactive map of Weddin Shire
- Coordinates: 33°54′S 148°09′E
- Country: Australia
- State: New South Wales
- Region: Central West
- Council seat: Grenfell

Government
  - Mayor: Craig Bembrick (Unaligned)
  - State electorate: Cootamundra
  - Federal division: Riverina

Area
  - Total: 3,410 km^{2} (1,320 sq mi)

Population
  - Totals: 3,664 (2016 census); 3,636 (2018 est.)
  - Density: 1.0745/km^{2} (2.783/sq mi)
- Website: Weddin Shire
LGAs around Weddin Shire
Lachlan	Forbes	Cabonne
Bland	Weddin Shire	Cowra
Temora	Hilltops	Hilltops

Weddin Shire is a local government area in the Central West region of New South Wales, Australia. The shire's major town is Grenfell and it also includes the small towns of Caragabal, Greenethorpe and Quandialla.

The mayor of Weddin Shire Council is Cr Paul Best, who is unaligned with any political party.

== Demographics ==
Selected historical census data for Weddin Shire local government area
Census year		2001	2006	2011	2016
Population	Estimated residents on census night	3,653	▼3,641	▲3,665	▼3,664
Population	LGA rank in terms of size within New South Wales			119th	▲118th
Population	% of New South Wales population	0.06%	0.06%	▼0.05%	0.05%
Population	% of Australian population	0.02%	0.02%	0.02%	0.02%
Cultural and language diversity					
Ancestry, top responses	Australian			36.2%	▼35.3%
Ancestry, top responses	English			33.7%	▼33.2%
Ancestry, top responses	Irish			9.9%	▼8.7%
Ancestry, top responses	Scottish			8.4%	▼8.3%
Ancestry, top responses	German			2.6%	▼2.4%
Language, top responses (other than English)	Cantonese	0.1%	▼ n/c	▲0.1%	▲0.3%
Language, top responses (other than English)	Tagalog	n/c	n/c	n/c	▲0.1%
Language, top responses (other than English)	Filipino	n/c	n/c	▲0.1%	0.1%
Language, top responses (other than English)	French	n/c	n/c	n/c	▲0.1%
Language, top responses (other than English)	Greek	0.1%	0.1%	0.1%	0.1%
Religious affiliation					
Religious affiliation, top responses	Anglican	32.2%	▼31.3%	▼30.6%	▼26.7%
Religious affiliation, top responses	Catholic	27.7%	▼27.0%	▼26.4%	▼24.1%
Religious affiliation, top responses	No Religion, so described	6.8%	▲8.1%	▲12.9%	▲18.5%
Religious affiliation, top responses	Not stated	n/c	n/c	n/c	▲10.3%
Religious affiliation, top responses	Uniting Church	9.4%	9.4%	▼8.9%	▼8.0%
Median weekly incomes					
Personal income	Median weekly personal income		A$330	A$383	A$492
Personal income	% of Australian median income		70.8%	▼66.4%	▲74.3%
Family income	Median weekly family income		A$775	A$874	A$1,193
Family income	% of Australian median income		66.2%	▼59.0%	▲68.8%
Household income	Median weekly household income		A$602	A$717	A$904
Household income	% of Australian median income		58.6%	▼58.1%	▲62.9%

== Council ==
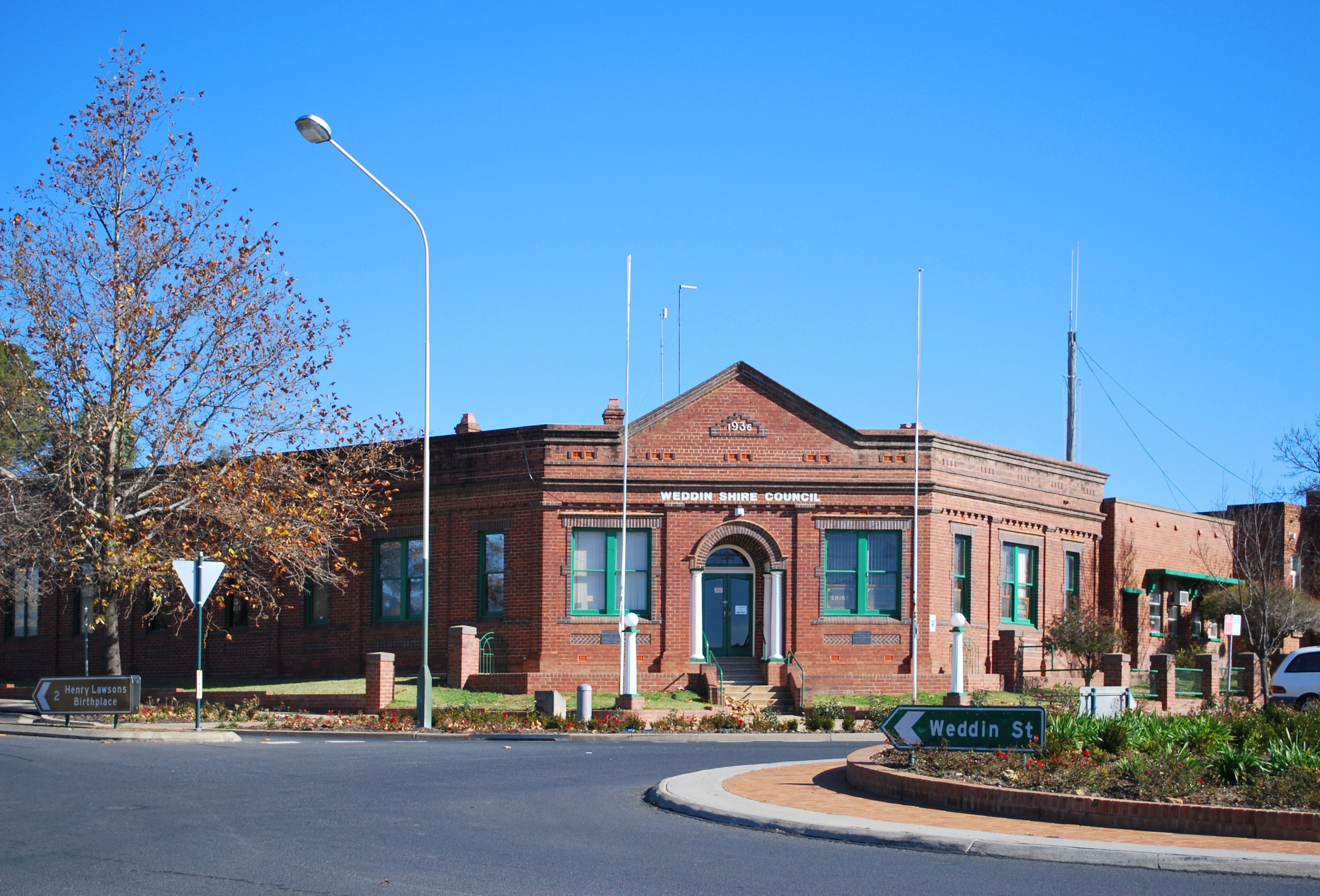
The Weddin Shire Council Chambers, in Grenfell

=== Current composition and election method ===
Weddin Shire Council is composed of nine councillors elected proportionally as a single ward. All councillors are elected for a fixed four-year term of office.

The current council

Councillor	Party	Notes
John Niven	Independent Labor	
Simon Rolls	Independent	
Paul Best	Independent	Mayor
Michael Neill	Independent	
Colleen Gorman	Independent	Deputy Mayor
Wezley Makin	Independent	
Jeanne Montgomery	Independent	
Chad White	Independent	
Jan Parlett	Independent	

== Election results ==
=== 2024 ===
2024 New South Wales local elections: Weddin
Party	Candidate	Votes	%	±%
Independent	Paul Best (elected)	459	20.2	+13.4
Independent Labor	John Niven (elected)	400	17.6	
Independent	Michael Neill (elected)	197	8.7	
Independent	Simon Rolls (elected)	230	10.1	
Independent	Chad White (elected)	156	6.9	−1.6
Independent	Colleen Gorman (elected)	150	6.6	
Independent	Jan Partlett (elected)	119	5.2	
Independent	Wezley Makin (elected)	118	5.2	
Independent	Gordon Gam	90	4.0	
Independent	Jeanne Montgomery (elected)	81	3.6	
Independent	Michelle Cook	71	3.1	−2.6
Independent	Glenda Howell	57	2.5	+0.1
Independent	Julie Gilmore	49	2.2	
Independent	Phillip Moore	46	2.0	
Independent	Warwick Frame	46	2.0	+0.9
Total formal votes		2,269	95.5	
Informal votes		106	4.5	
Turnout		2,375	85.2	

== Heritage listings ==
Weddin Shire has a number of heritage-listed sites, including:

- Iandra Road, Greenethorpe: Iandra Castle
- Koorawatha-Grenfell railway, Grenfell: Grenfell railway station
