= Reefton, New South Wales =

Locality in New South Wales, Australia

Reefton New South Wales
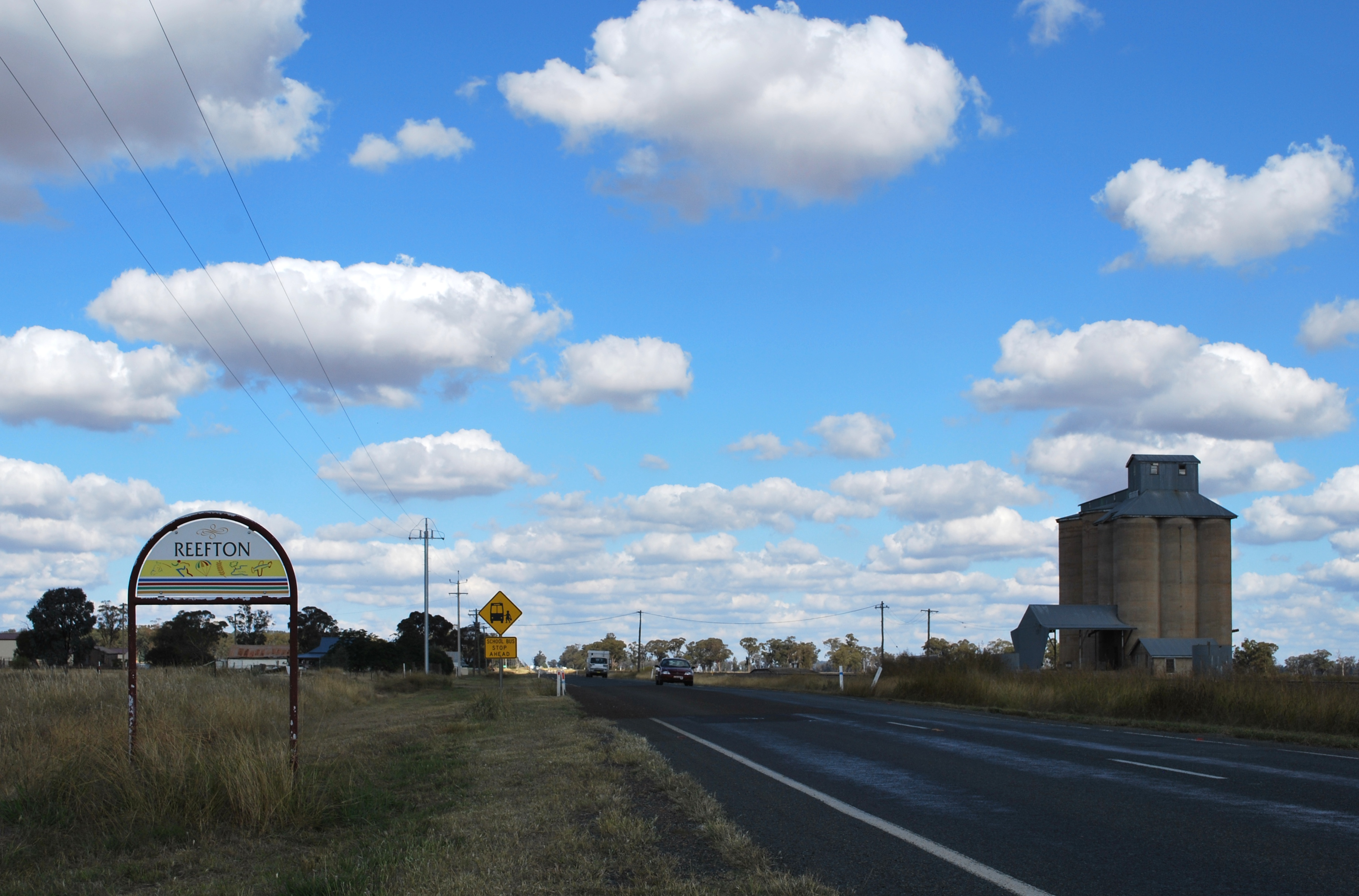
- Entry to Reefton village area

- Coordinates: 34°14′35.5″S 147°26′05.5″E
- Population: 34 (2021 census)
- Postcode(s): 2666
- Elevation: 253 m (830 ft)
- Location: 446 km (277 mi) W of Sydney; 24.5 km (15 mi) NNW of Temora
- LGA(s): Temora Shire
- State electorate(s): Cootamundra
- Federal division(s): Riverina
Localities around Reefton:
West Wyalong	Barmedman	Quandialla
	Reefton	Morangarell
Ariah Park	Gidginbung	Narraburra

Reefton is a locality in the Temora Shire local government area of the Riverina region of New South Wales Australia. It lies on the Goldfields Way, between Temora and West Wyalong, to the south of Barmedman. There was once a gold mining village of the same name, which is now a ghost town. What remains of the second village bearing the name still lies in the locality, on the Lake Cargelligo railway line, and there was once a railway station, also called Reefton. The locality is rural with crop raising and grazing being the main economic activities.

The area now known as Reefton lies on the traditional land of Wiradjuri people.

Most of the locality is relatively flat land but, to the east of the village site and just outside the locality, Pinnacle Mountain rises to an elevation of 447m. The source of Barmedman Creek lies within the locality.

The original mining village lay slightly to the east of the newer village on the railway. Its establishment followed the discovery of gold-bearing quartz reefs in the area, in 1894. The miners themselves laid out a town and gave it the name Gidginbung, but it was renamed Reefton before it was proclaimed as a village in 1896. It is likely, but not certain, that the village was named after the gold mining town of Reefton, New Zealand.

Opening of a sawmill allowed the erection of buildings in the village, and it soon had two general stores, several small stores, two bakers, three butchers, three boarding houses, a working man’s club, the Reefton Hotel, post office and police station. Some of the villages planned streets were South and West Streets, and some streets named after local identities, Nixon, Owen, Storm, and Lauder.

Fifty men were working in four mines in the area in 1897. However, the field had a relatively short life, with mining all but ceasing in 1902. There was sporadic production of small amounts of gold between 1905 and 1937. Even by 1898, the village was in decline and, by 1902, all that left was the hotel, post office, school, and a few houses. The Reefton Hotel was destroyed by fire, in 1920; it was insured, but apparently was not rebuilt. Reefton had a school from November 1894 to December 1971.

The second village to be known as Reefton is now the site of a small cluster of settlement, on the eastern side of the Lake Cargelligo railway line. It was originally known as West Reefton. It dates from the coming of the railway—Reefton station opened in 1903—being proclaimed as a village in February 1907. Between West Reefton and the mining village of Reefton, was an area of common land, shared by both villages. West Reefton was officially renamed Reefton, in 1974, by which time the older mining village had effectively ceased to exist.

The railway station closed in 1975, and was demolished. There is still a grain silo near the site of the old station, but it is no longer used as a train loading location. The names of three of the streets of the second village remain in use, Reefton Street, Carruthers Street, and Austral Street, although these no longer entirely conform to the village's plan.
