= Sebastopol, New South Wales =

Sebastopol New South Wales
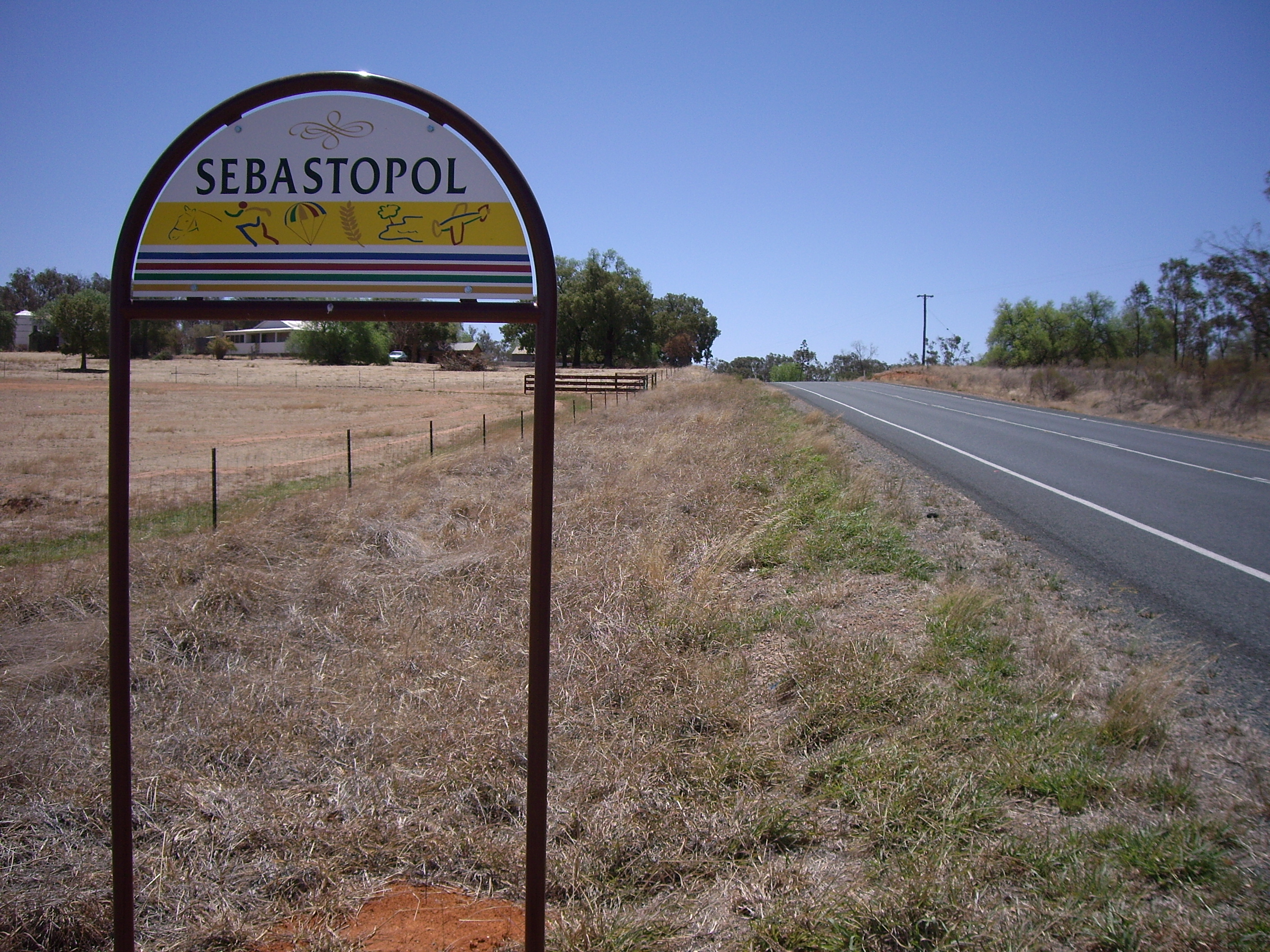
- Entering Sebastopol

- Coordinates: 34°34′48″S 147°31′03″E
- Population: 56 (SAL 2021)
- Postcode(s): 2666
- Elevation: 299 m (981 ft)
- Location: 15 km (9 mi) from Temora; 19 km (12 mi) from Junee Reefs
- LGA(s): Temora Shire
- County: Clarendon
- State electorate(s): Cootamundra
- Federal division(s): Riverina

Sebastopol is a village community in the north east part of the Riverina, in New South Wales, Australia. It is situated about 15 kilometres south of Temora and 19 kilometres north of Junee Reefs. The name is also applied to the surrounding rural locality, for statistical and postal purposes.

The area now known as Sebastopol lies on the traditional lands of Wiradjuri people.

It was named after Sevastopol, the site of an important battle during the Crimean War. Gold was mined there from c. 1870. It was the first to be discovered of a line of gold mining locations that ran north-north-west, from Junee Reefs, through Sebastopol, Temora, Reefton, and Barmedman, to West Wyalong.

The early days of the gold field were difficult; the closest police were at Morangorell, and water, carried from springs near Combaning, had to be purchased by the cask.

The first large quartz reef mine on the field was the Morning Star, begun in 1869, which was also the most productive, recorded as producing 0.93 tonnes of gold. The other large mine was the Homeward Bound. Both of these mines were rich in gold at a relatively shallow depth, yielding around eight ounces of gold to the ton; more gold was recovered later by retreating the tailings from these mines. From 1895 to 1898, the cyanide process was used to recover 0.5 ounces of gold per ton from the tailings. After 1896, mining on the field declined to small-scale and intermittent operations, but some mining activity continued in the area into the first half of the 20th Century.

The mines were long-lived enough for a mining village of around 500 people to form. It had three hotels, three stores and two butcher's shops. Sebastopol Post Office opened on 7 March 1870 and closed in 1973. Sebastopol had a school from 1871 to 1949. An Anglican church building remains in the locality some distance away from the old mining village, at a sub-locality once known as Bagdad; it is no longer used as a church, having been sold in 2016. There was also a school named Bagdad, from 1884 to 1912 and later from 1923 to 1948. Apart from some ruined buildings, little remains of the original mining village of Sebastopol.

Near Sebastopol is the 248 hectare site of a 90 Mega-Watt solar farm that became operational in December 2021.

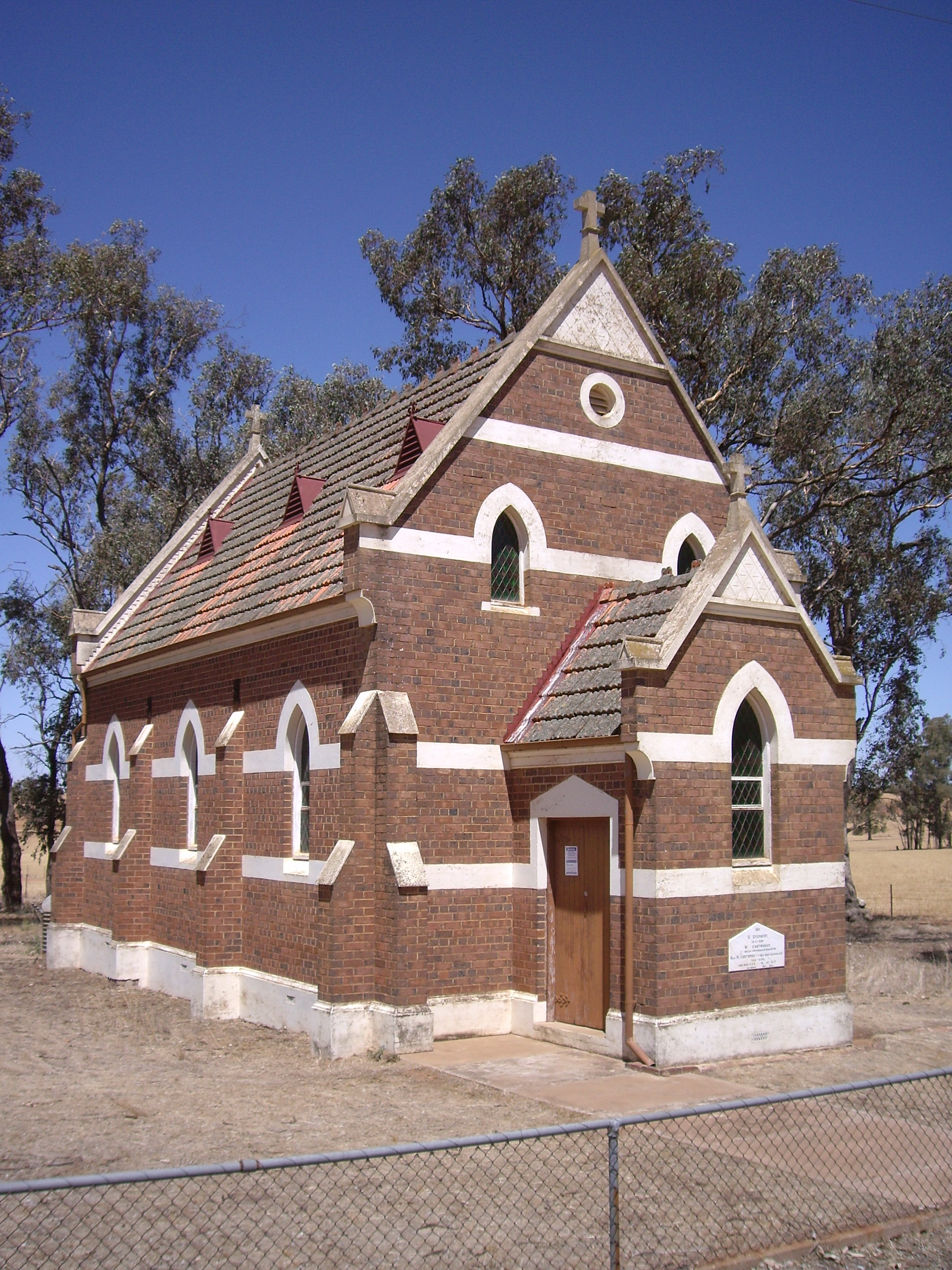
St Stephen's Church Sebastopol

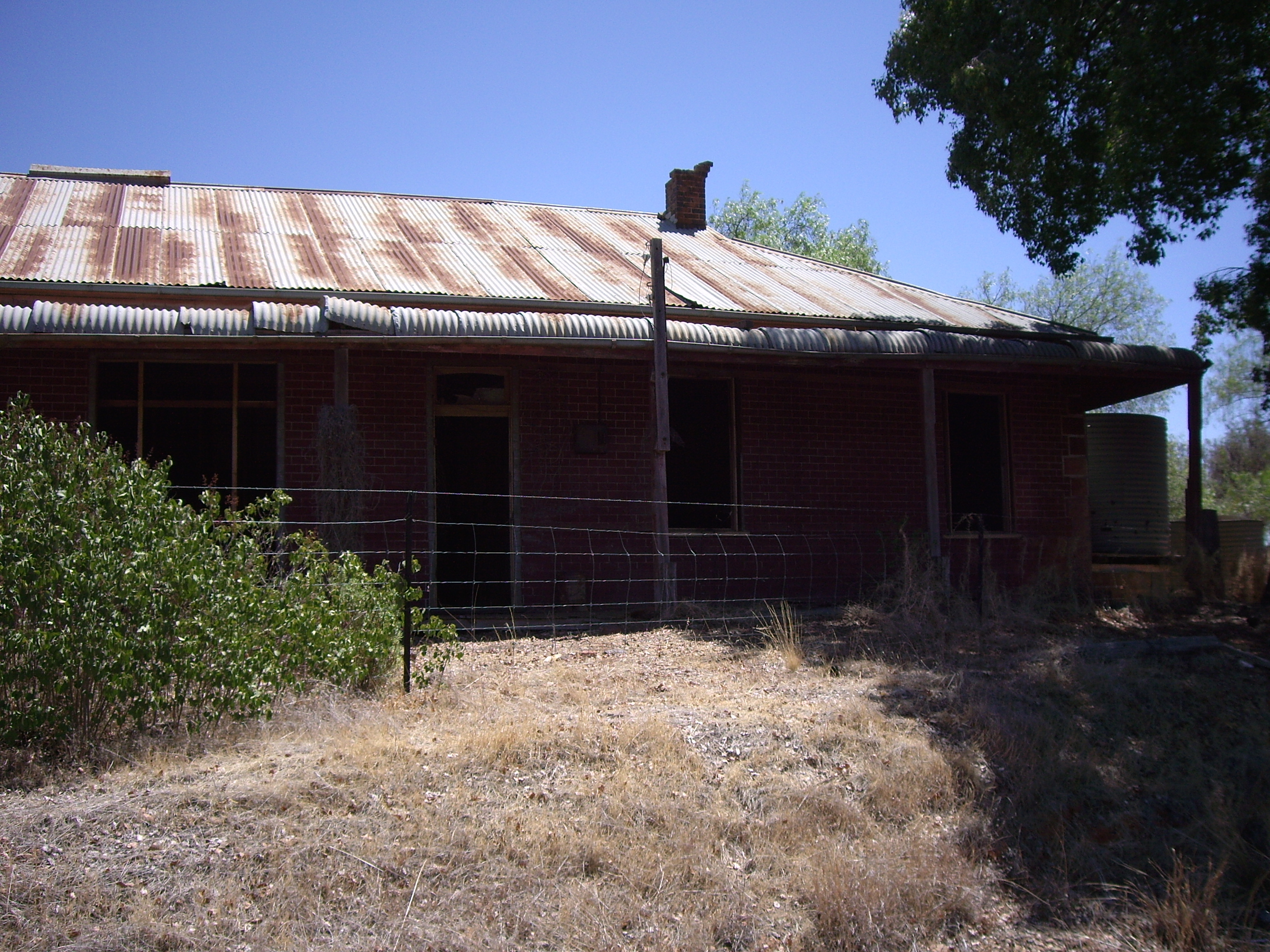
Ruins at Sebastopol
