= Junee Reefs =

- Town
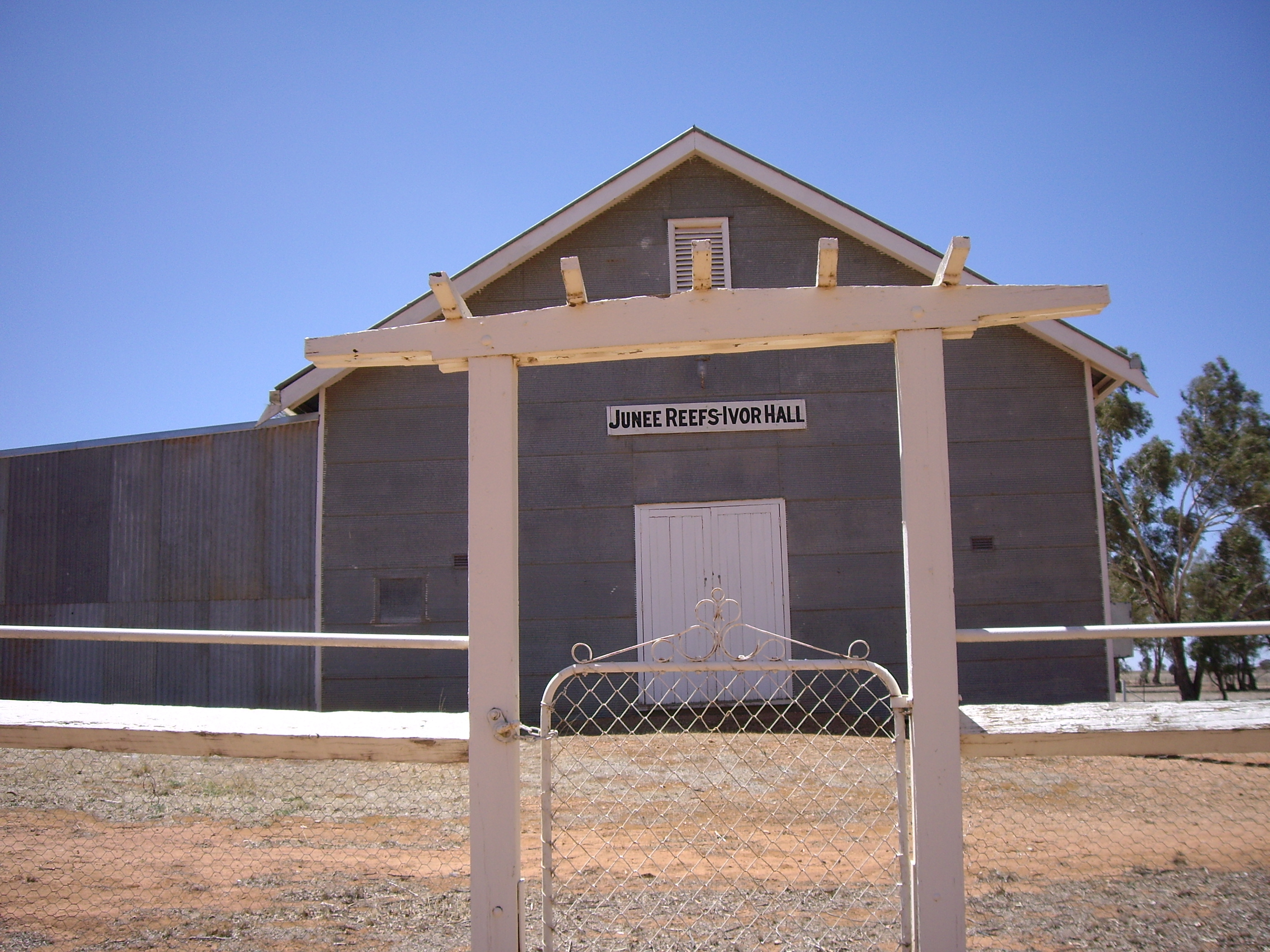
- Junee Reefs – Ivor Hall

- Coordinates: 34°43′41″S 147°37′49″E
- Country: Australia
- State: New South Wales
- LGA: Junee Shire
- Location: 19 km (12 mi) from Junee; 19 km (12 mi) from Sebastopol

Government
  - State electorate: Cootamundra
  - Federal division: Riverina
- Elevation: 303 m (994 ft)

Population
  - Total: 86 (2021 census)
- Postcode: 2666
- County: Clarendon

Junee Reefs is a locality in the south east part of the Riverina, Australia. It is situated by road, about 19 kilometres north of Old Junee and 19 kilometres south of Sebastopol. At the 2021 census, Junee Reefs had a population of 86 people.

It the most southerly of a line of gold mining locations that ran north-north-west, from Junee Reefs, through Sebastopol, Temora, Reefton, and Barmedman, to West Wyalong.

A difficulty for early gold miners was a lack of water. Mining of Wallett's quartz reef was well underway in April 1869, shafts had been sunk on Eaglehawk reef, about a quarter of a mile away, and quartz had been taken from Hope reef. A settlement had sprung up around the mines, which included a hotel and a store, butcher, and baker.

The Reefs Post Office opened on 1 January 1878, was renamed Junee Reefs in 1917. The original post office stood on the banks of Houlaghans Creek, which was also the site of the hotel and a crushing battery, and so seems to have been the site of the early mining settlement. In 1930, the post office was relocated by around a mile, to be on the main road, between Junee and Temora, now Goldfields Way. It closed in 1971.

There was a school at Junee Reefs from November 1884 until December 1944. The war memorial dates from 1921 and commemorates former pupils of the school who fought in the First World War. After the school closed, various options were considered for the memorial, but the memorial remained at its original location, the last service being held there in 1974. It was not until 2007 that it was restored and relocated to its present site outside the Ivor Hall, the old mining village's public hall, which was built in 1926. It was rededicated in March 2008. A separate memorial was erected nearby, which also commemorates those who fought in other wars.

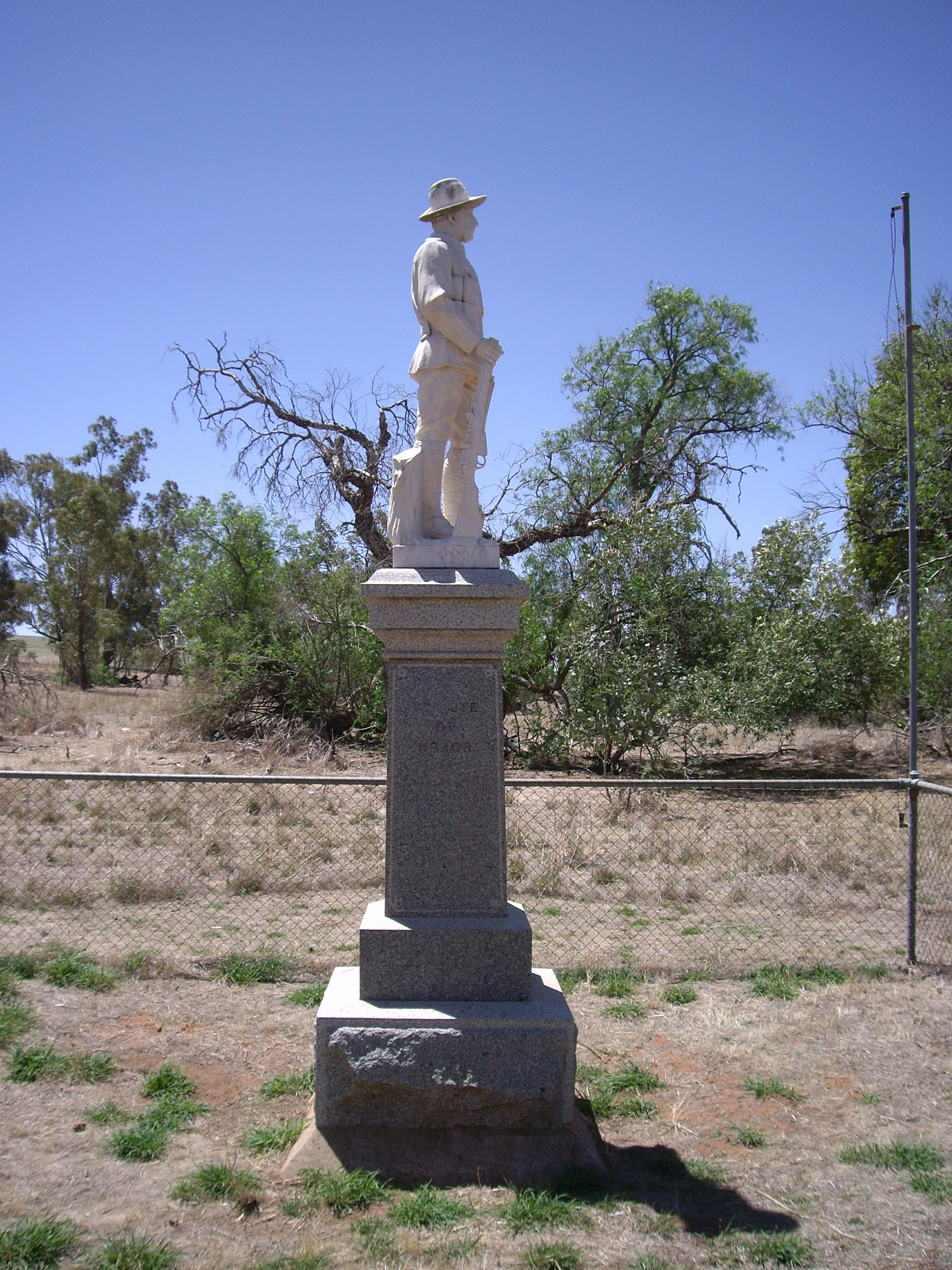
Junee Reefs Memorial
