= Barmedman Creek =

Barmedman Mandamah
- Location of the Barmedman Creek mouth in New South Wales

Location
- Country: Australia
- State: New South Wales
- Region: South Eastern Highlands, Riverina (IBRA), South Western Slopes
- LGAs: Temora, Bland
- Town: Barmedman

Physical characteristics
- Source
  - location: near Reefton
  - coordinates: 34°17′8″S 147°26′48″E
  - elevation: 261 m (856 ft)
- Mouth: Bland Creek
  - location: near Marsden
  - coordinates: 33°45′8″S 147°30′54″E
  - elevation: 208 m (682 ft)
- Length: 85 km (53 mi)

Basin features
- River system: Lachlan sub-catchment, Murray–Darling basin
- Tributaries
  - left: Yiddah Creek

The Barmedman Creek, a mostly–perennial river that is part of the Lachlan sub-catchment of the Murrumbidgee catchment within the Murray–Darling basin, is located in the South Western Slopes, and Riverina regions of New South Wales, Australia. The Barmedman Creek is only connected to the Murray Darling basin when the Bland Creek, the Lachlan and Murrumbidgee Rivers are in flood.

== Course and features ==
The Barmedman Creek (technically a river) rises near Reefton, between the towns of Temora and Barmedman, and flows generally north, joined by one minor tributary, before reaching its confluence with the Bland Creek. The creek descends 53 metres (174 ft) over its 185-kilometre (115 mi) course.

The creek is crossed by the Newell Highway south of the river mouth and east of Wyalong.

== See also ==
- List of rivers of New South Wales (A–K)
- Rivers of New South Wales
