= Goldfields Way =

Goldfields Way New South Wales
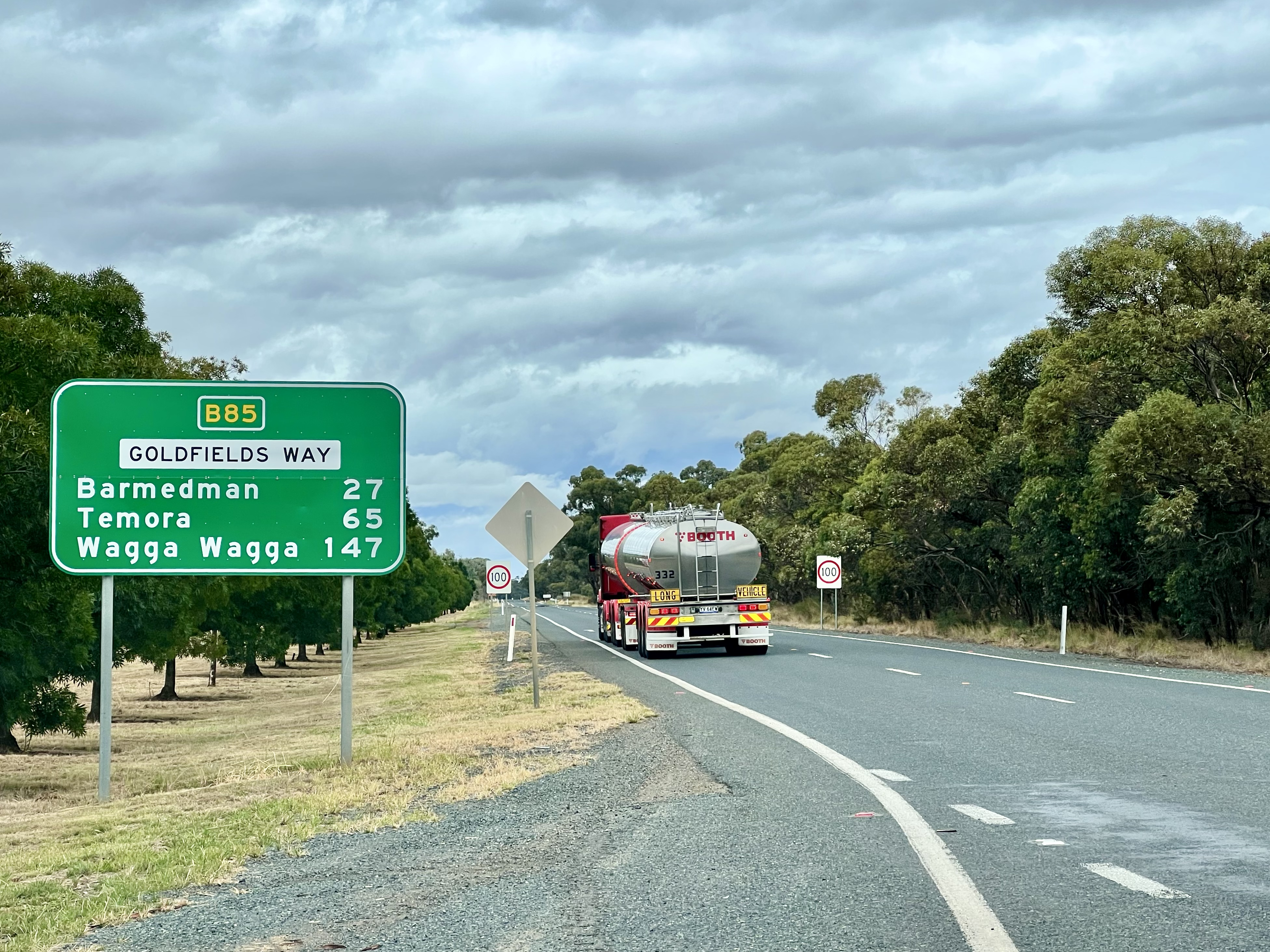
- Heading south along Goldfields Way, just south of the intersection with Newell Highway
- Coordinates: 33.926464°S 147.251318°E (North end); 34.864689°S 147.500679°E (South end)

General information
- Type: Rural road
- Length: 116 km (72 mi)
- Gazetted: August 1928
- Route number(s): B85 (2013–present)
- Former route number: State Route 85 (1974–2013)

Major junctions
- North end: Newell Highway; Wyalong, New South Wales
- Burley Griffin Way
- South end: Olympic Highway; Old Junee, New South Wales

Location(s)
- Major settlements: Barmedman, Gidginbung, Temora, Sebastopol

Goldfields Way is a 116-kilometre (72 mi) country road in the northern part of the Riverina region of New South Wales, connecting Wyalong via Temora to Old Junee.

== Route ==
Goldfields Way commences at the intersection with Newell Highway at Wyalong in the north and heads in a south-easterly direction before it intersects with Burley Griffin Way as it passes through the town of Temora. It continues in a southerly direction before it ends at an intersection with Olympic Highway at Old Junee.

== History ==
The passing of the Main Roads Act of 1924 through the Parliament of New South Wales provided for the declaration of Main Roads, roads partially funded by the State government through the Main Roads Board (later the Department of Main Roads, and eventually Transport for NSW). Main Road No. 57 was declared along this road on 8 August 1928, from the intersection with Monaro Highway (today Sturt Highway) at Wagga Wagga, via Old Junee and Temora to Wyalong (and continuing northwards via Condobolin and Tullamore to the intersection with North-Western Highway, today Mitchell Highway, at Trangie). With the passing of the Main Roads (Amendment) Act of 1929 to provide for additional declarations of State Highways and Trunk Roads, this was amended to Trunk Road 57 on 8 April 1929.

The southern end of Trunk Road 57 was truncated just south of Old Junee when the declaration of Olympic Way (later named Olympic Highway) subsumed the former alignment on 19 June 1963.

The passing of the Roads Act of 1993 updated road classifications and the way they could be declared within New South Wales. Under this act, Goldfields Way today retains its declaration as part of Main Road 57, from Wyalong to Old Junee.

Goldfields Way was signed State Route 85 across its entire length in 1974. With the conversion to the newer alphanumeric system in 2013, this was replaced with route B85.

== Major intersections ==
LGA	Location	km	mi	Destinations	Notes
Bland	Wyalong	0.0	0.0	Newell Highway (A39/B64) – Hay, Cowra, Parkes	Northern terminus of Goldfields Way and route B85
Bland	Barmedman	28.1	17.5	Mary Gilmore Way – Grenfell	
Temora	Temora	63.9	39.7	Milvale Road – Milvale, Young	Roundabout
Temora	Temora	64.2	39.9	Burley Griffin Way (B94) – Griffith, Wallendbeen, Bowning	Roundabout
Temora	Temora	64.7	40.2	Old Cootamundra Road – Cootamundra	
Junee	Old Junee	112	70	Canola Way – Coolamon, Grong Grong	
Junee	Old Junee	116	72	Olympic Highway (A41) – Junee, Wagga Wagga, Albury	Southern terminus of Goldfields Way and route B85
1.000 mi = 1.609 km; 1.000 km = 0.621 mi: Route transition

== See also ==
- Highways in Australia
- Highways in New South Wales
