= Bland Creek Bridge =

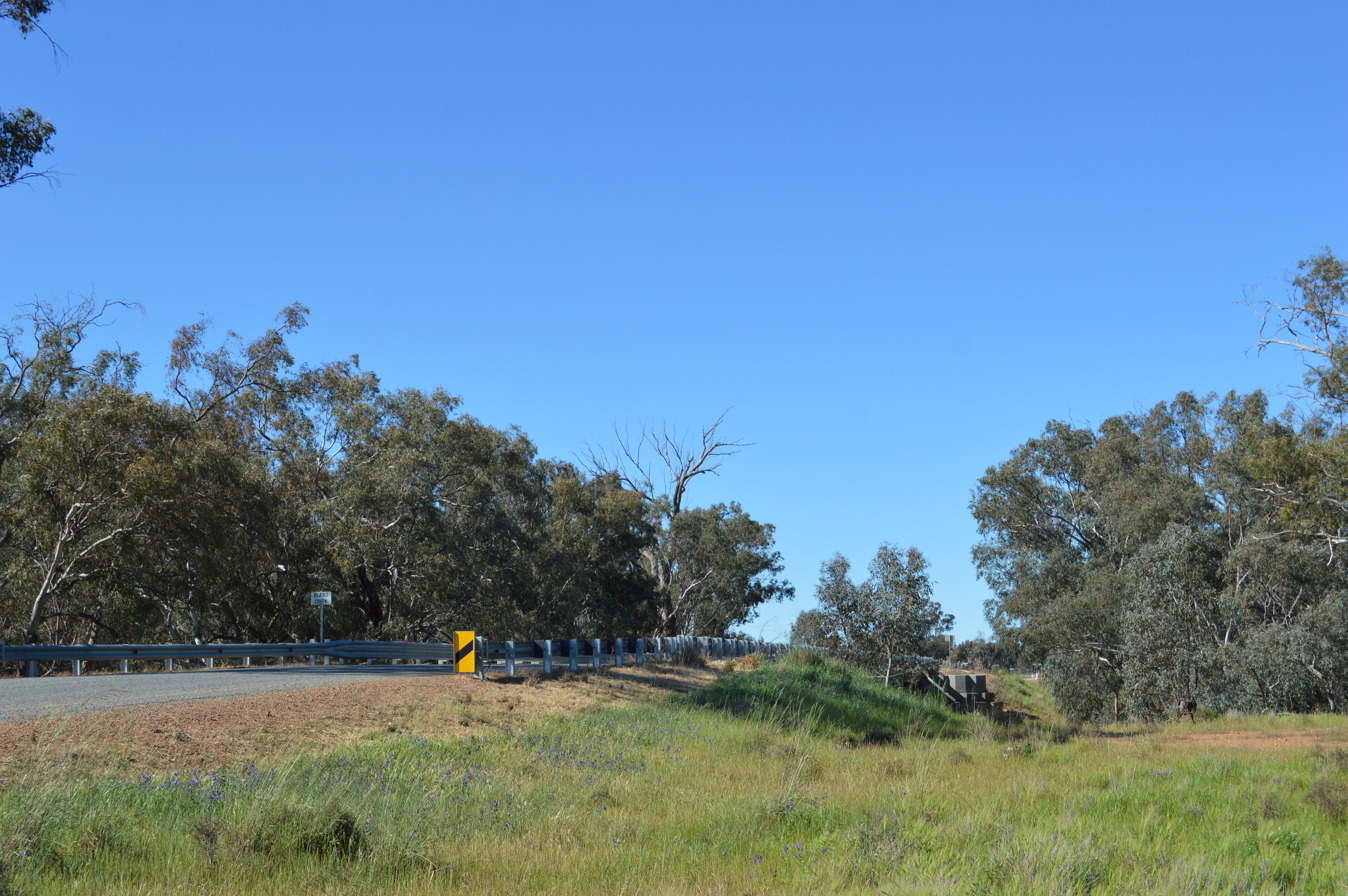
- Bridge over Bland Creek at Morangarell, in 2013
- Coordinates: 33°45′43″S 147°31′14″E
- Carries: Newell Highway
- Crosses: Bland Creek
- Locale: Morangarell, Bland Shire, New South Wales, Australia
- Owner: Transport for NSW

Characteristics
- Design: Road bridge
- Material: Cast iron

Location
- Interactive map of Bland Creek Bridge

Bland Creek Bridge is a cast iron road bridge that carries the Newell Highway across Bland Creek in Morangarell, Bland Shire, New South Wales, Australia. It was constructed in the late 1990s, following the Roads & Traffic Authority's massive 1990s construction roll-out of a central New South Wales bridge project.

The bridge replaced an earlier bridge, opened in 1934.
