= Berthong Creek =

Berthong Yannawah
- Location of the Berthong Creek mouth in New South Wales

Location
- Country: Australia
- State: New South Wales
- Region: South Eastern Highlands, Riverina (IBRA), South West Slopes
- LGAs: Cootamundra, Temora, Bland

Physical characteristics
- Source
  - location: west of Wombat
  - coordinates: 34°26′18″S 148°7′40″E
  - elevation: 444 m (1,457 ft)
- Mouth: Bland Creek
  - location: near Grogan
  - coordinates: 34°20′7″S 147°49′29″E
  - elevation: 262 m (860 ft)
- Length: 40 km (25 mi)

Basin features
- River system: Lachlan sub-catchment, Murray–Darling basin
- Tributaries
  - left: Long Reach Creek
- Dams: Berthong Dam

The Berthong Creek, a mostly–perennial river that is part of the Lachlan sub-catchment of the Murrumbidgee catchment within the Murray–Darling basin, is located in the South West Slopes, and Riverina regions of New South Wales, Australia. The Berthong Creek is only connected to the Murray Darling basin when the Bland Creek, the Lachlan and Murrumbidgee Rivers are in flood.

== Course and features ==
The Berthong Creek (technically a river) rises west of Wombat, between the towns of Stockinbingal and Young, and flows generally north by west, joined by one minor tributary, before reaching its confluence with the Bland Creek. The creek descends 182 metres (597 ft) over its 40-kilometre (25 mi) course. The creek is impounded by the Berthong Dam south of Yannawah.

== See also ==
- List of rivers of New South Wales (A-K)
- Rivers of New South Wales
