= Burrangong Creek =

Burrangong Creek Burrangong
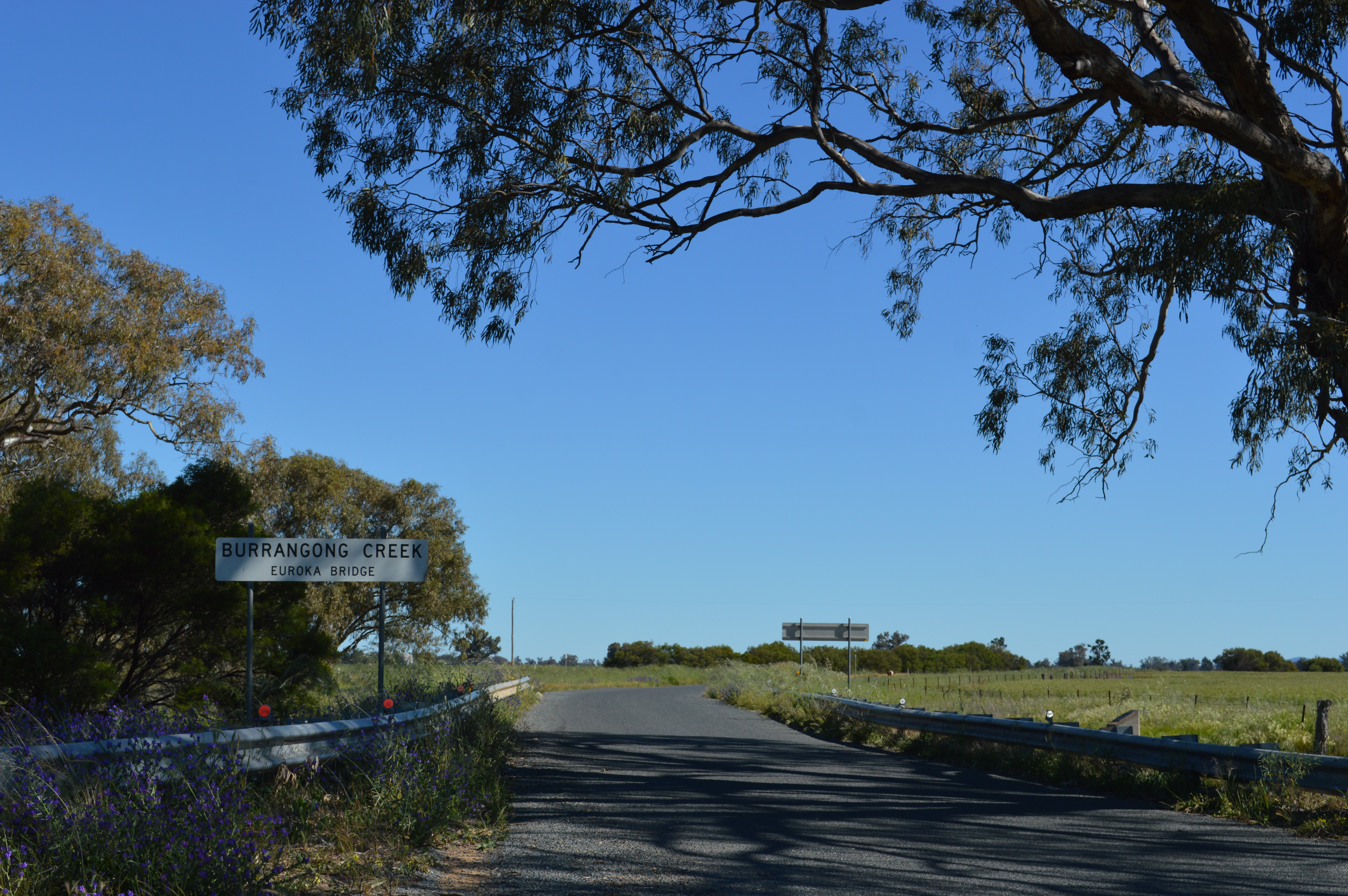
- Quandialla Euroka Bridge

- Location of the Bulla Creek mouth in New South Wales

Location
- Country: Australia
- State: New South Wales
- Region: South Eastern Highlands (IBRA), South West Slopes
- LGA: Young

Physical characteristics
- Source: Great Dividing Range
  - location: south of Monteagle
  - coordinates: 34°11′48″S 148°20′29″E
  - elevation: 437 m (1,434 ft)
- Mouth: confluence with Bland Creek
  - location: between Young and Grenfell
  - coordinates: 34°7′25″S 148°13′54″E

Basin features
- River system: Lachlan sub-catchment, Murray–Darling basin

The Burrangong Creek, a mostly–perennial stream that is part of the Lachlan sub-catchment of the Murrumbidgee catchment within the Murray–Darling basin, is located in the South West Slopes region of New South Wales, Australia. The Creek is between Young and Grenfell.

== Network ==
Burrangong Creek is only connected to the Murray Darling basin when Bland Creek and both the Lachlan and Murrumbidgee Rivers are in flood.

Burrangong Creek is a tributary of Bland Creek, which descends 101 metres (331 ft) over its 22-kilometre (14 mi) course.

== See also ==
- List of rivers of New South Wales (A-K)
- Rivers of New South Wales
