= Morangarell =

Locality in New South Wales, Australia

- Town
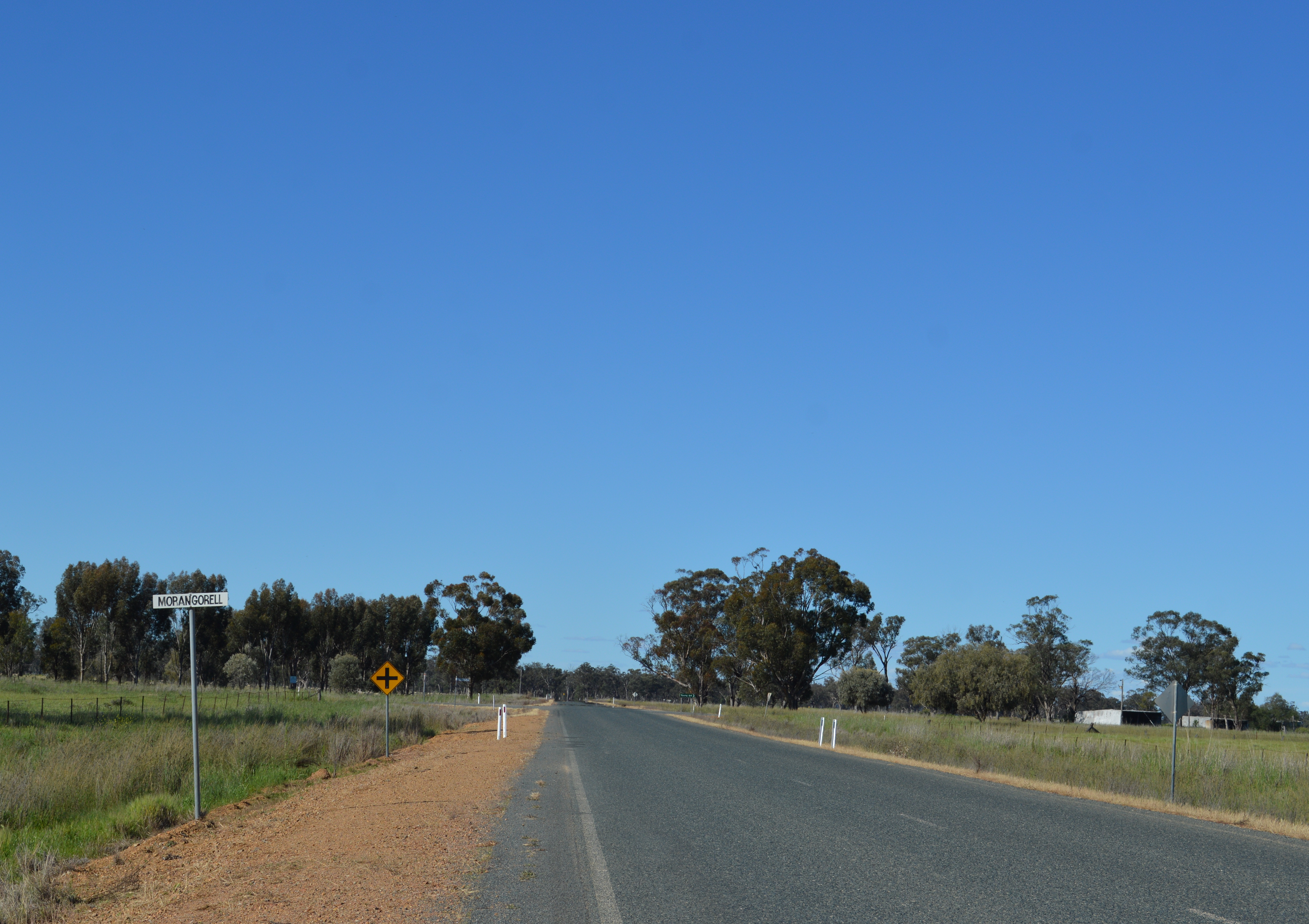
- Former village site (2013)

- Coordinates: 34°08′48.7″S 147°42′05.7″E
- Country: Australia
- State: New South Wales
- LGA: Bland Shire
- Location: 440 km (270 mi) W of Sydney; 129 km (80 mi) NNE of Wagga Wagga; 59 km (37 mi) SW of Grenfell

Government
  - State electorate: Cootamundra
  - Federal division: Parkes
- Elevation: 232 m (761 ft)

Population
  - Total: 34 (2021 census)
- Postcode: 2666
Localities around Morangarell
West Wyalong	Quandialla	Bimbi
Barmedman	Morangarell	Bribbaree
Narraburra	Grogan	Milvale

Morangarell is a locality in Bland Shire in the Riverina region of New South Wales, Australia. There was once a village of the same name, now a ghost town. Morangarell lies between Temora and Grenfell, and Barmedman and Young. The locality is bisected by Bland Creek, a tributary of Lachlan River. The locality is rural, with the main economic activities being raising crops and grazing.

The area now known as Morangarell lies on the traditional lands of Wiradjuri people. The name Morangarell is said to mean “water fowl’s nest”.

The village, officially a town, was located within the modern-day locality, near the junction of modern-day Mary Gilmore Way—it bisects the old town site—and what is still known as McGregor Street. Morangarell serviced the needs of the surrounding agricultural properties, 'Moonbucca', 'Morangarell', 'Curraburrama' and 'The Retreat'.

The heyday of the village was from the 1870s to around 1918. It was only in November 1884, that the site of the Town of Morangarell was officially declared. In 1899, its plan was altered by closing streets and lanes and cancelling some land. A new street, East Street, was opened.

There has been a post office in the area since 1858. A church building, used by multiple denominations, opened in 1860. The first hotel dated from 1864; it later burned down but was rebuilt. It had a police court, by 1873. Morangarell was also at the convergence of roads leading to Young, Temora, Stockinbingal, Forbes, Barmedman, and Grenfell.

The southern section of the Stockinbingal–Parkes railway line, between Forbes and Stockinbingal, authorised in 1911, was completed in 1918. The Lake Cargelligo railway line opened in 1917. The new lines did not pass through Morangarell; consequently, economic activity and services migrated to newly-established villages that lay on a railway, such as Bribbaree and Quandialla.

There was a school there from October 1913 to June 1920. The police station closed in March 1929, and the police presence relocated to Bribbaree. The Morangarell Hotel closed in late 1936, and had been demolished by mid 1937. The post office, which was staffed by the same postmistress for over forty years up to 1930, seems to have been closed by around the end of 1937. In 1972, reservations of land for the village's recreation area, public buildings, and public hall were revoked. In October 1974, the Town of Morangarell officially ceased to exist, and was redesignated as a locality.

The village's cemetery survives.
