= Springdale, New South Wales =

Springdale
- Town
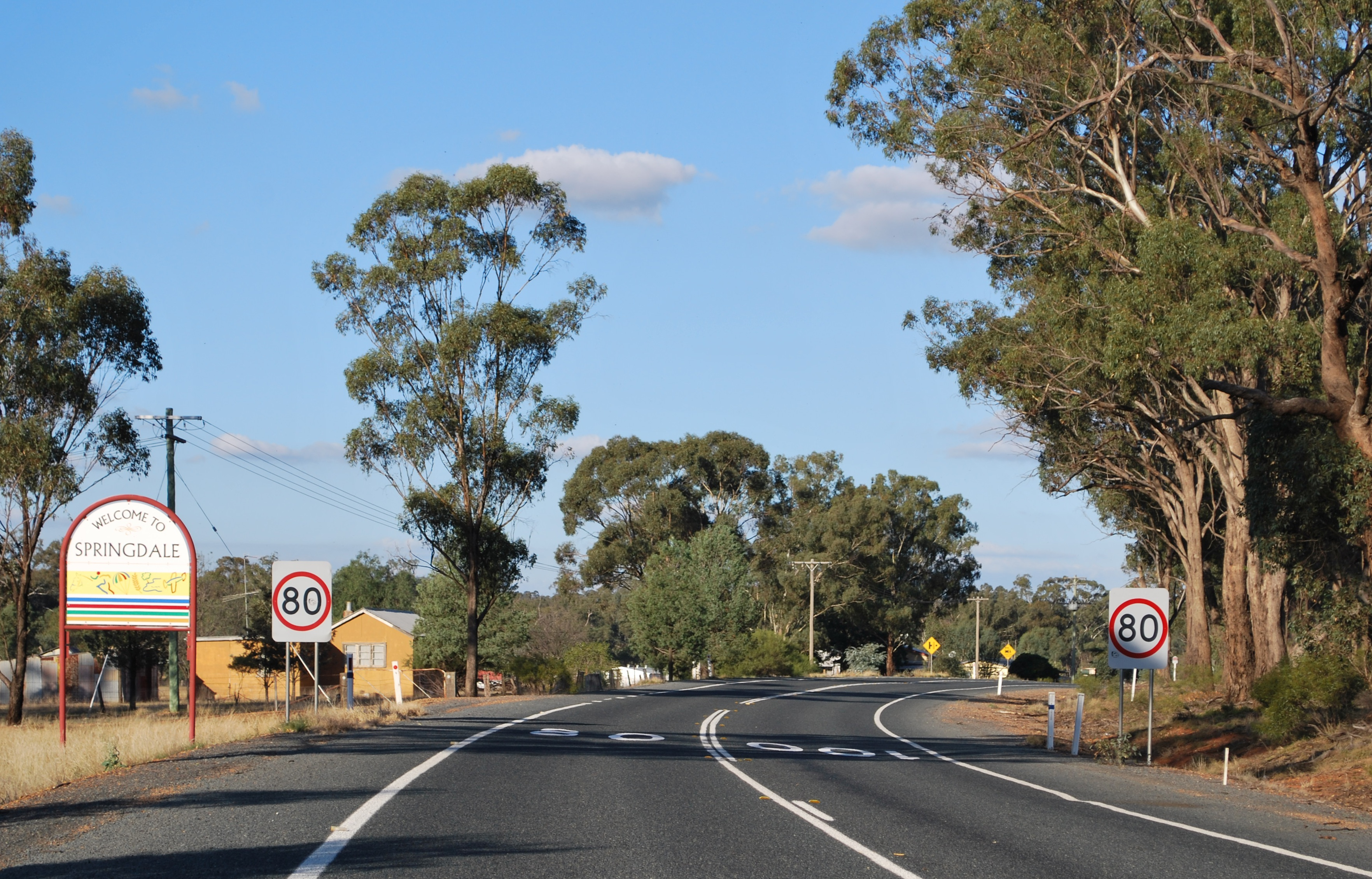
- Entering Springdale

- Coordinates: 34°27′S 147°43′E
- Country: Australia
- State: New South Wales
- LGA: Temora Shire
- Location: 3 km (1.9 mi) from Combaning; 23 km (14 mi) from Stockinbingal

Government
  - State electorate: Cootamundra
  - Federal division: Riverina

Population
  - Total: 126 (SAL 2021)
- Postcode: 2666
- County: Bland

Springdale is a village community in the central north part of the Riverina region of the Australian state of New South Wales. It is situated by road, about 3 kilometres east of Combaning and 23 kilometres north west of Stockinbingal. At the 2016 census, it had a population of 150. At the 2021 census, it had a population of 126.

Springdale Post Office opened on 1 November 1897 and closed in 1977. A railway station on the branch line to Lake Cargelligo served the community between 1893 and 1975.

== Gallery ==
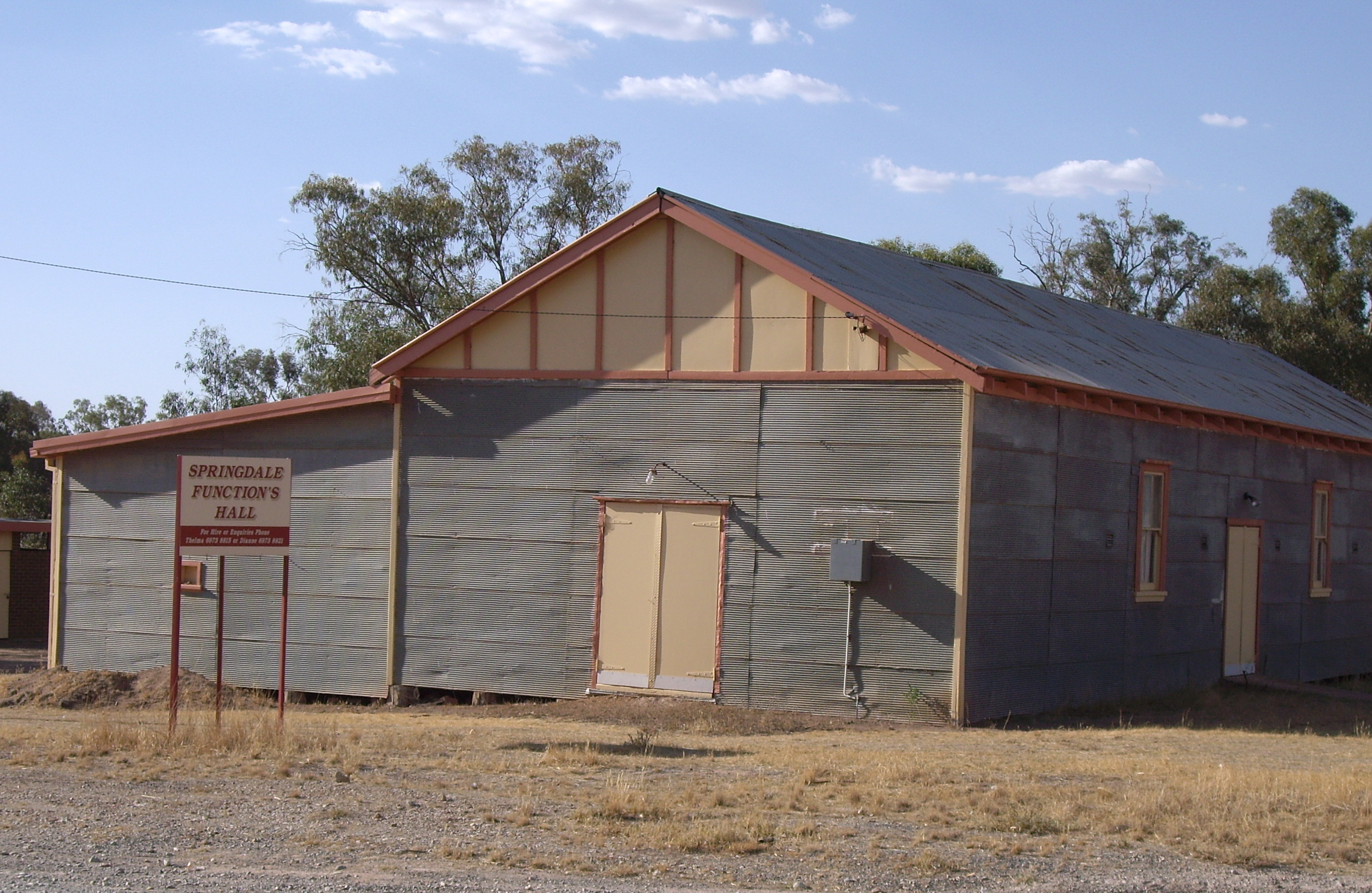
Springdale Functions Hall

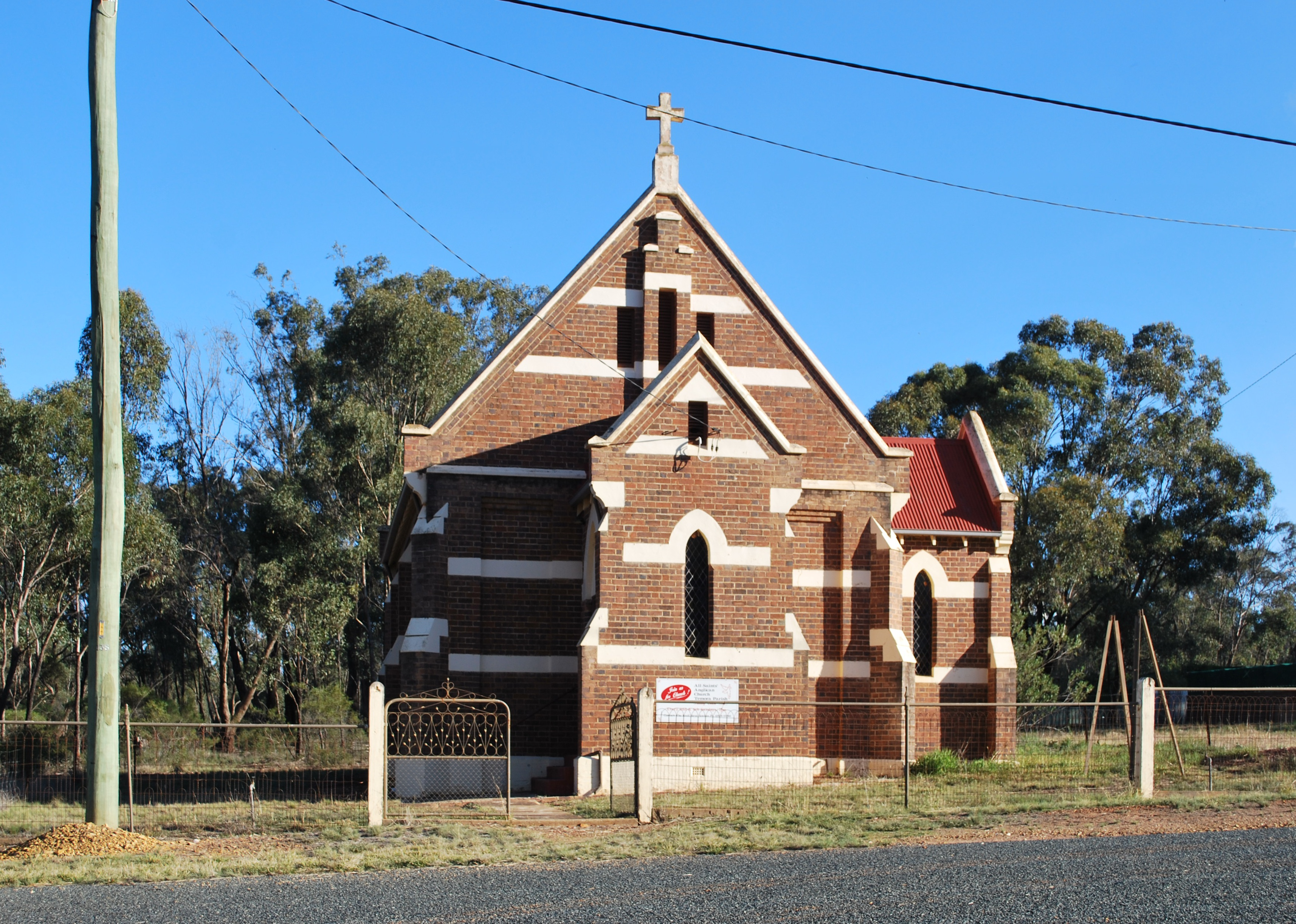
All Saints Anglican church

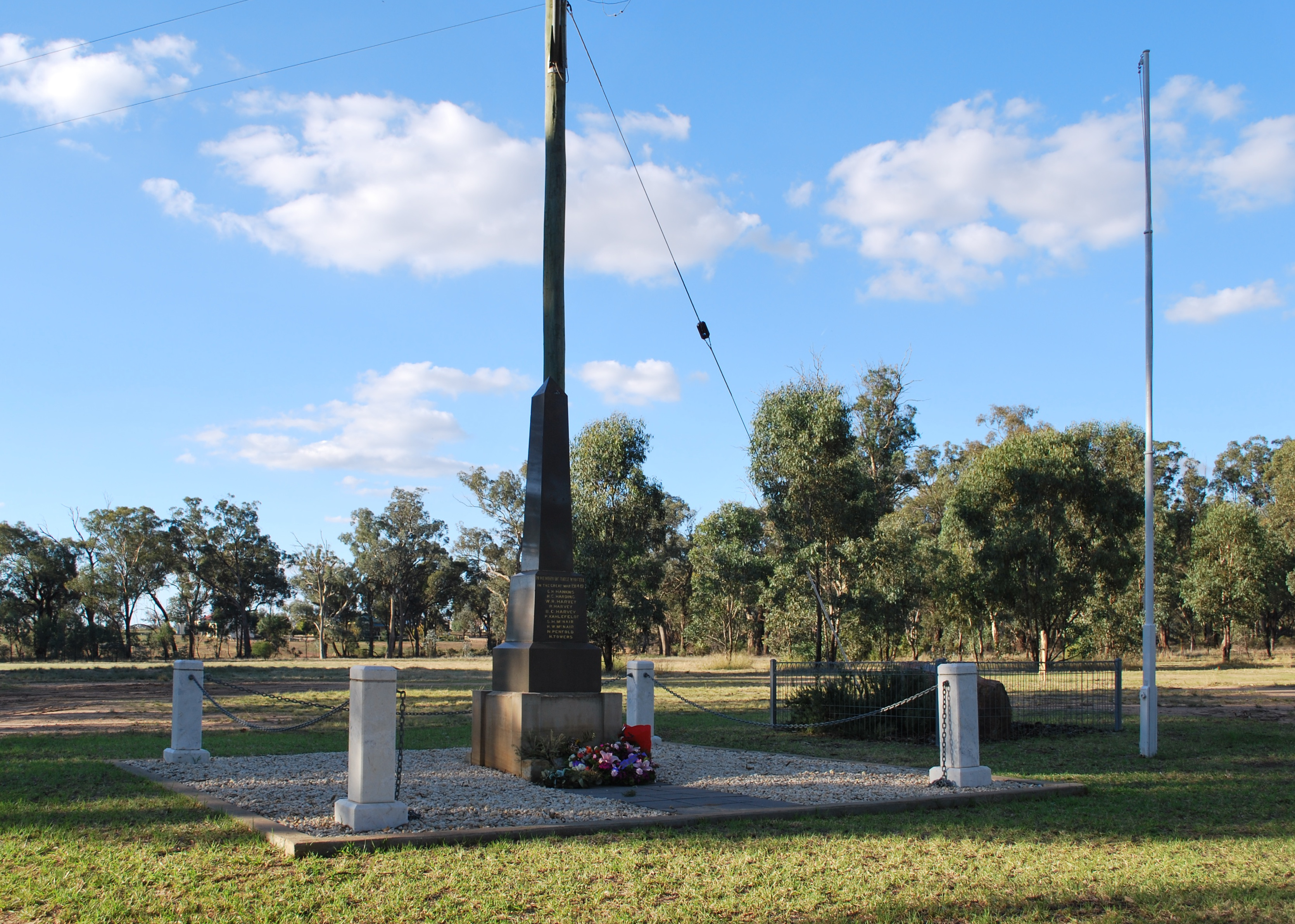
War memorial

== Springdale railway station ==
Preceding station	Former services	Following station
Combaning towards Lake Cargelligo	Lake Cargelligo Line	Gundibindyal towards Cootamundra
