= Bland Creek =

Bland Yeo Yeo Creek
- Location of the Bland Creek mouth in New South Wales
- Etymology: In honour of William Bland; and hence, Bland Shire

Location
- Country: Australia
- State: New South Wales
- Region: South Eastern Highlands, Riverina (IBRA), South West Slopes
- LGAs: Cootamundra-Gundagai, Temora, Bland
- Town: Stockinbingal

Physical characteristics
- Source: Twins Range
  - location: near Frampton
  - coordinates: 34°39′5″S 147°53′16″E
  - elevation: 390 m (1,280 ft)
- Mouth: Lake Cowal
  - coordinates: 33°40′45″S 147°28′10″E
  - elevation: 205 m (673 ft)
- Length: 173 km (107 mi)
- Basin size: 940,000 km^{2} (360,000 sq mi)

Basin features
- River system: Lachlan sub-catchment, Murray–Darling basin
- Tributaries
  - left: Narraburra Creek, Barmedman Creek
  - right: Berthong Creek, Rushy Creek, Weedallion Creek, Bribbaree Creek, Burrangong Creek

The Bland Creek, a mostly–perennial river that is part of the Lachlan sub-catchment of the Murrumbidgee catchment within the Murray–Darling basin, is located in the South West Slopes, and Riverina regions of New South Wales, Australia. The Bland Creek is only connected to the Murray Darling basin when both the Lachlan and Murrumbidgee Rivers are in flood.

== Course and features ==
The Bland Creek (technically a river) rises below Twins Range, a northern spur of the Great Dividing Range, and flows generally north northwest, joined by seven minor tributaries, before reaching its mouth and spilling into Lake Cowal, the largest natural inland lake in New South Wales. The creek descends 185 metres (607 ft) over its 173-kilometre (107 mi) course.

Eucalyptus camaldulensis (river red gum) woodland occurs along the edges of the Bland Creek. In 2012 it was reported that the Bland Creek mallee fowl was on the brink of extinction.

The creek is crossed by the Newell Highway south of the river mouth and east of Wyalong.

== See also ==
- List of rivers of New South Wales (A-K)
- Rivers of New South Wales
