= Combaning =

- Town
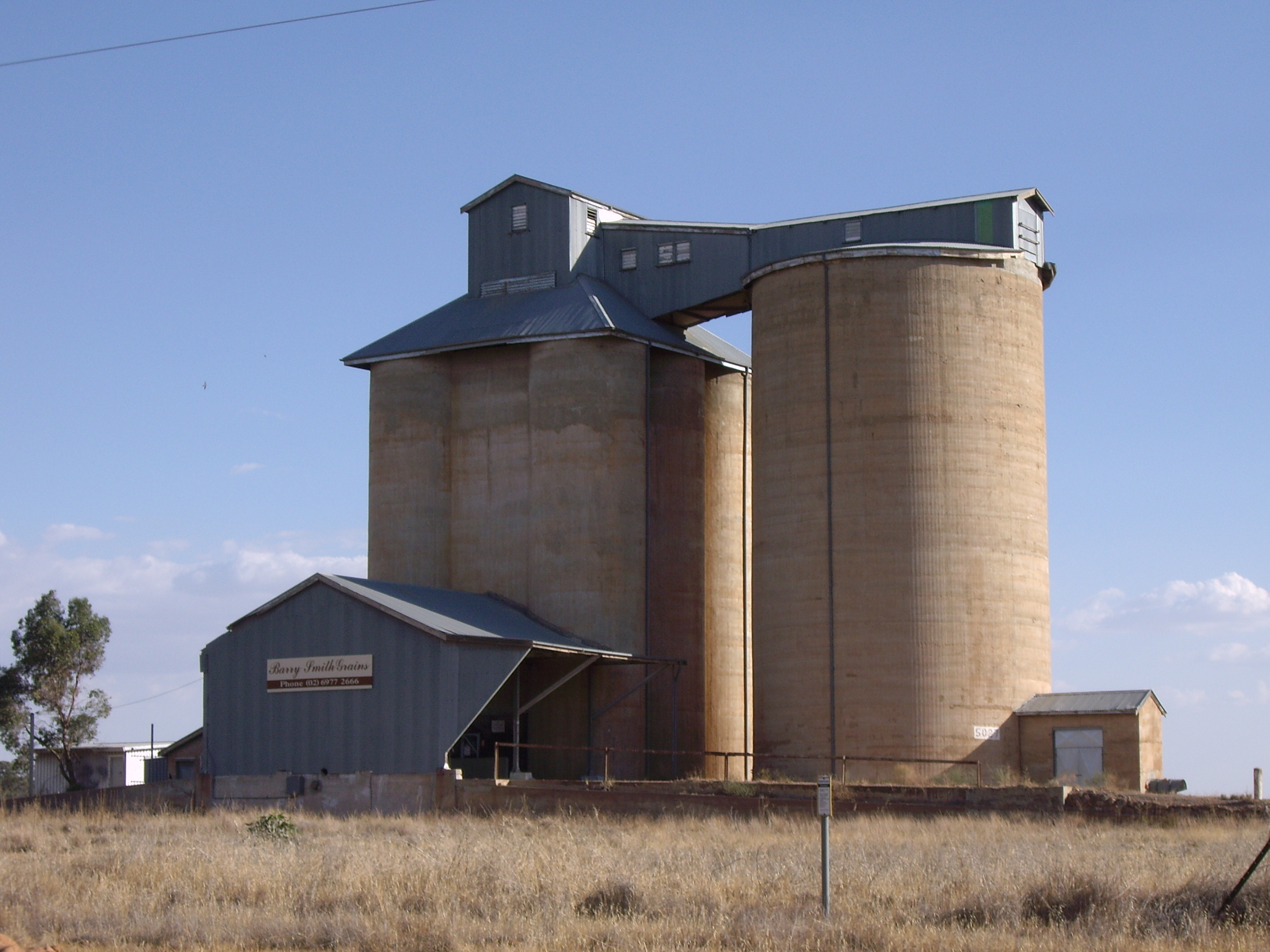
- Silos at Combaning

- Coordinates: 34°27′31″S 147°40′56″E
- Country: Australia
- State: New South Wales
- LGA: Temora Shire
- Location: 409 km (254 mi) from Sydney; 98 km (61 mi) from Wagga Wagga; 13 km (8.1 mi) from Temora; 3 km (1.9 mi) from Springdale

Government
  - State electorate: Cootamundra
  - Federal division: Riverina
- Elevation: 303 m (994 ft)

Population
  - Total: 100 (2021 census)
- Postcode: 2666
- County: Bland

Combaning is a rural community in the north east part of the Riverina. By road it is about 3 kilometres west of Springdale and 13 kilometres east of Temora. At the 2021 census, Combaning had a population of 100 people.

The place name Combaning is derived from the local Aboriginal (Yuin) word meaning 'to hold water'.

== Combaning railway station ==
A railway station on the branch line to Lake Cargelligo served the community between 1893 and 1975.

Preceding station	Former services	Following station
Temora towards Lake Cargelligo	Lake Cargelligo Line	Springdale towards Cootamundra
