= Quandialla =

- Town
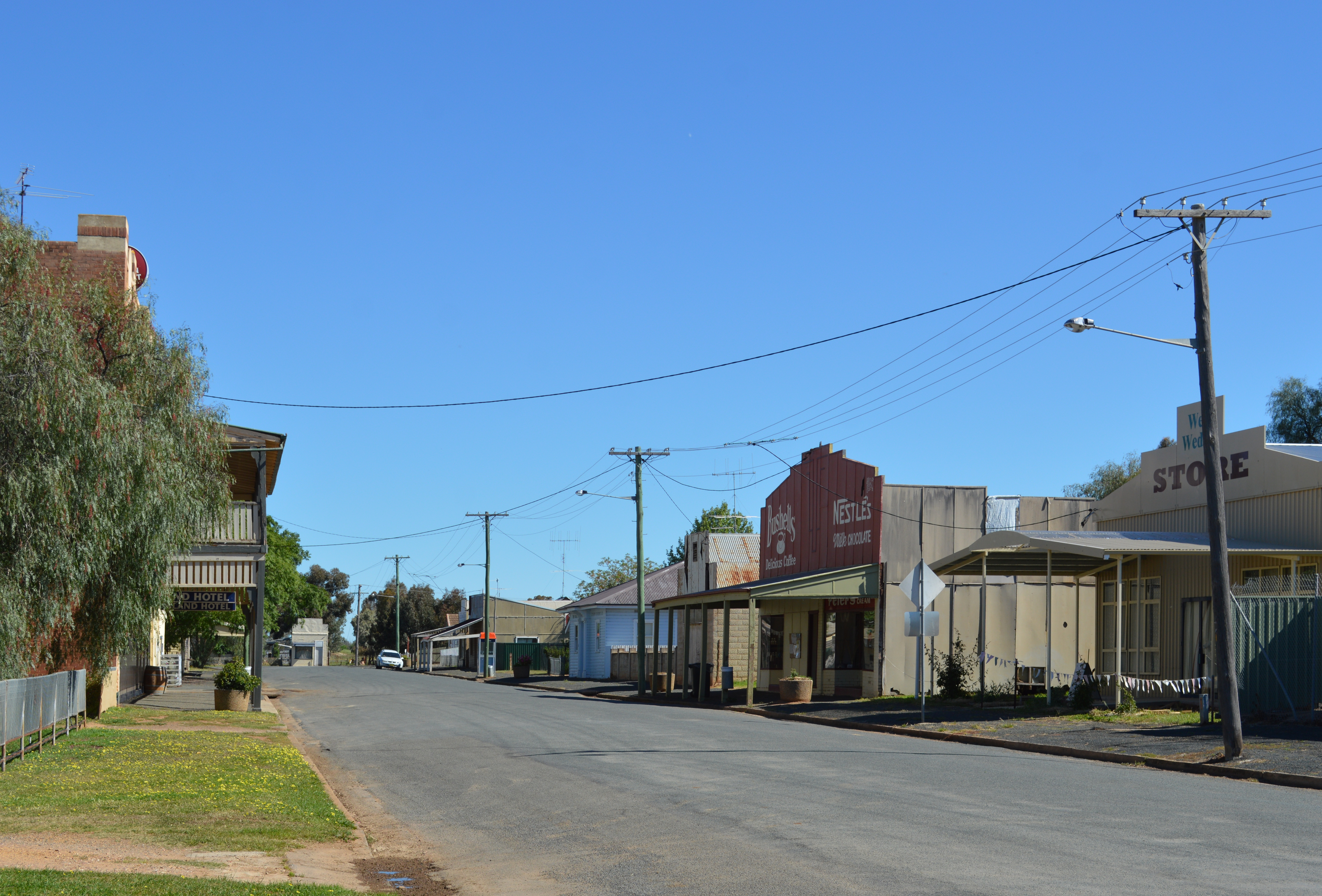
- Second Street, the main street of Quandialla, 2013

- Coordinates: 34°00′41″S 147°47′35″E
- Country: Australia
- State: New South Wales
- LGA: Weddin Shire
- Location: 412 km (256 mi) W of Sydney; 169 km (105 mi) N of Wagga Wagga; 46 km (29 mi) SW of Grenfell

Government
  - State electorate: Cootamundra
  - Federal division: Riverina
- Elevation: 250 m (820 ft)

Population
  - Total: 349 (2011 census)
- Postcode: 2721

Quandialla is a village in the Central West region of New South Wales Australia. The town is 412 kilometres (256 mi) west of Sydney. It is situated on the plains at the western edge of the Weddin Shire. The town of Grenfell is 46 kilometres (29 mi) to the north-east, Young is 65 kilometres (40 mi) to the south-east and West Wyalong is 57 kilometres (35 mi) to the west. The Weddin Mountains are within sight.

At the 2011 census, Quandialla and the surrounding area had a population of 349.

== History ==
Home to the Wiradjuri people, the area was first settled by Europeans in the 1830s. According to Bruce Robinson "The area was 'station' country known as 'The Bland' or 'The Levels' and was famous for its prime grazing and fattening pastures..." The villages of Morangarell to west, and Bimbi to the east, developed along creeks and pre-dated Quandialla.

The Quandialla township, founded in 1914, was a product of the coming of the Stockinbingal-Parkes railway line. Opening in 1916, the rail line was both a result of closer settlement - and the move from grazing to farming, as well as a catalyst for the further development of a grain based farming economy. Quandialla became an important service town for wheat production and fat lamb raising. The Quandialla Post Office opened on 19 June 1916.

The township grew rapidly in the 1920s, while Bimbi and Morangarell, which were bypassed by the railway, went into decline. In the 1950s Quandialla was serviced by three motor garages, two stock and station agents, a cinema, state and Roman Catholic schools and sales yards with yardings of up to 10,000 stock. In the late 1950s the Quandialla Central School enrolment exceeded 230 pupils, compared with 50 in 2009. Over 600 people attended the opening of the Memorial Hall in 1955. The town until recently had its own hospital.

== Today ==
In 2010 the village still retained its general store, The Bland Hotel, the central school, a public swimming pool and a bowling club. The Quandialla area today is in the heart of the wheat belt, as well as producing other grains - canola, oats and barley. Wool and fat lamb production are also significant.

== Film and television ==
Cinematographer Don McAlpine was born and raised in Quandialla. McAlpine started his career as a physical education teacher. He then moved on to cinematography, filming a wide range of well known movies such as Breaker Morant, Moulin Rouge, My Brilliant Career, Predator, Mrs Doubtfire, Romeo and Juliet, Patriot Games and The Getting of Wisdom.

'1915', a television mini-series about two young Australian soldiers during World War I was partly filmed in Quandialla and Bimbi. This film sold to almost 40 countries and won two Logies.

== Climate ==
Climate data for Quandialla Post Office
Month	Jan	Feb	Mar	Apr	May	Jun	Jul	Aug	Sep	Oct	Nov	Dec	Year
Record high °C (°F)	45.0 (113.0)	44.8 (112.6)	41.0 (105.8)	34.1 (93.4)	28.2 (82.8)	24.4 (75.9)	24.8 (76.6)	27.8 (82.0)	34.4 (93.9)	37.3 (99.1)	43.4 (110.1)	43.5 (110.3)	45.0 (113.0)
Mean daily maximum °C (°F)	33.0 (91.4)	32.1 (89.8)	29.0 (84.2)	24.1 (75.4)	19.1 (66.4)	15.2 (59.4)	14.3 (57.7)	16.2 (61.2)	19.5 (67.1)	23.7 (74.7)	27.5 (81.5)	31.4 (88.5)	23.8 (74.8)
Mean daily minimum °C (°F)	17.1 (62.8)	17.0 (62.6)	13.8 (56.8)	9.6 (49.3)	6.4 (43.5)	4.1 (39.4)	2.9 (37.2)	3.6 (38.5)	5.6 (42.1)	8.7 (47.7)	11.9 (53.4)	14.9 (58.8)	9.6 (49.3)
Record low °C (°F)	5.9 (42.6)	6.8 (44.2)	2.7 (36.9)	−1.0 (30.2)	−4.0 (24.8)	−6.0 (21.2)	−5.8 (21.6)	−5.5 (22.1)	−2.6 (27.3)	−0.5 (31.1)	1.8 (35.2)	4.5 (40.1)	−6.0 (21.2)
Average precipitation mm (inches)	49.0 (1.93)	44.0 (1.73)	43.9 (1.73)	41.7 (1.64)	43.3 (1.70)	39.9 (1.57)	44.1 (1.74)	42.6 (1.68)	40.6 (1.60)	51.0 (2.01)	44.0 (1.73)	44.3 (1.74)	528.5 (20.81)
Average precipitation days	4.7	4.7	4.6	5.0	6.7	8.5	9.7	9.2	7.5	7.3	6.3	5.4	79.6
