= Narraburra =

Narraburra New South Wales
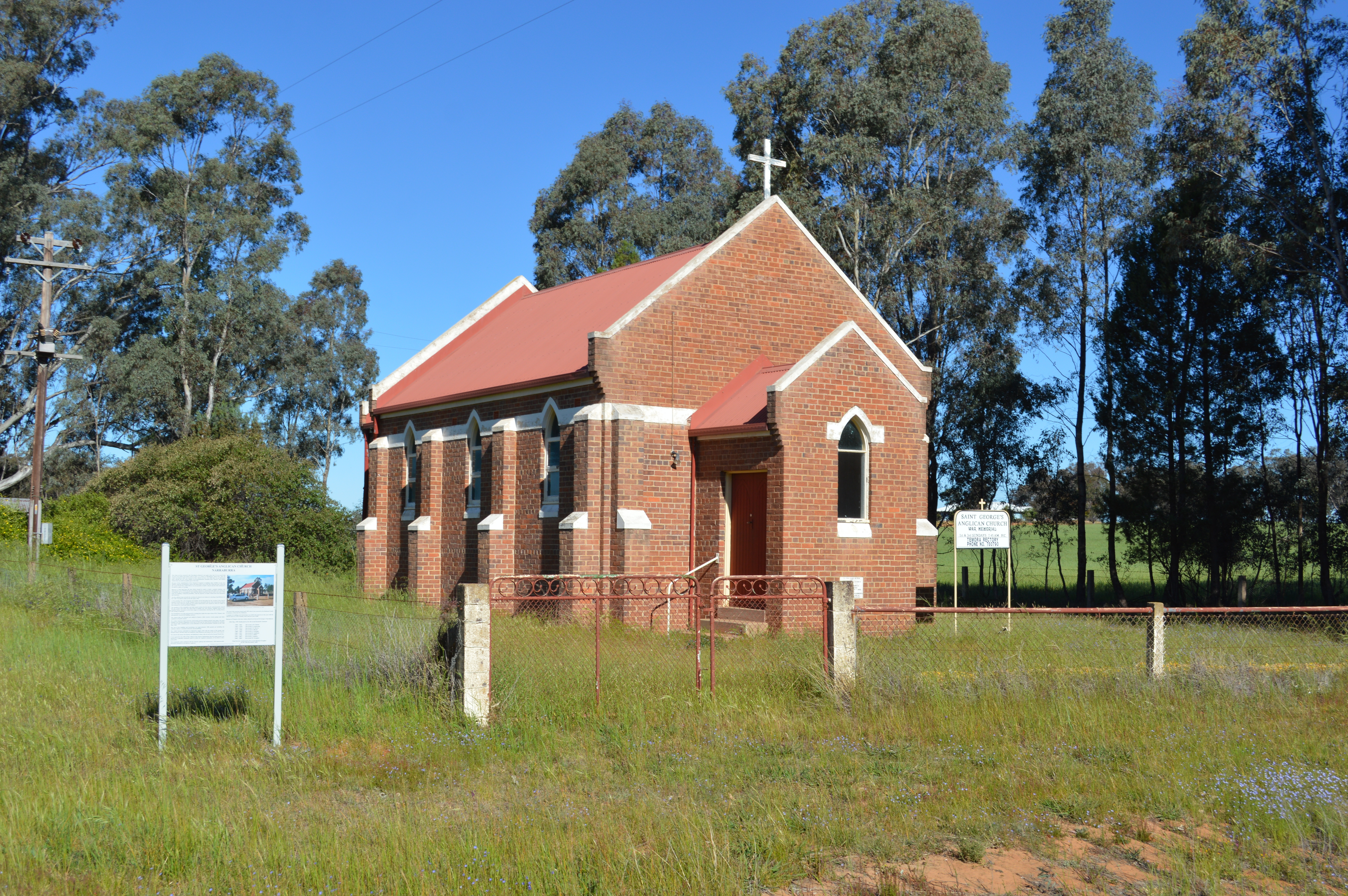
- St George's Anglican church at Narraburra

- Coordinates: 34°17′S 147°41′E
- Population: 70 (SAL 2021)
- Postcode(s): 2666
- Location: 431 km (268 mi) SW of Sydney; 98 km (61 mi) N of Wagga Wagga; 12 km (7 mi) NE of Temora
- LGA(s): Temora Shire
- State electorate(s): Cootamundra
- Federal division(s): Riverina

Narraburra is a locality in the Riverina region of New South Wales, Australia. The locality is in the Temora Shire, 431 kilometres (268 mi) west of the state capital, Sydney.

At the 2016 census, Narraburra had a population of 62.
