= Gidginbung =

Gidginbung New South Wales
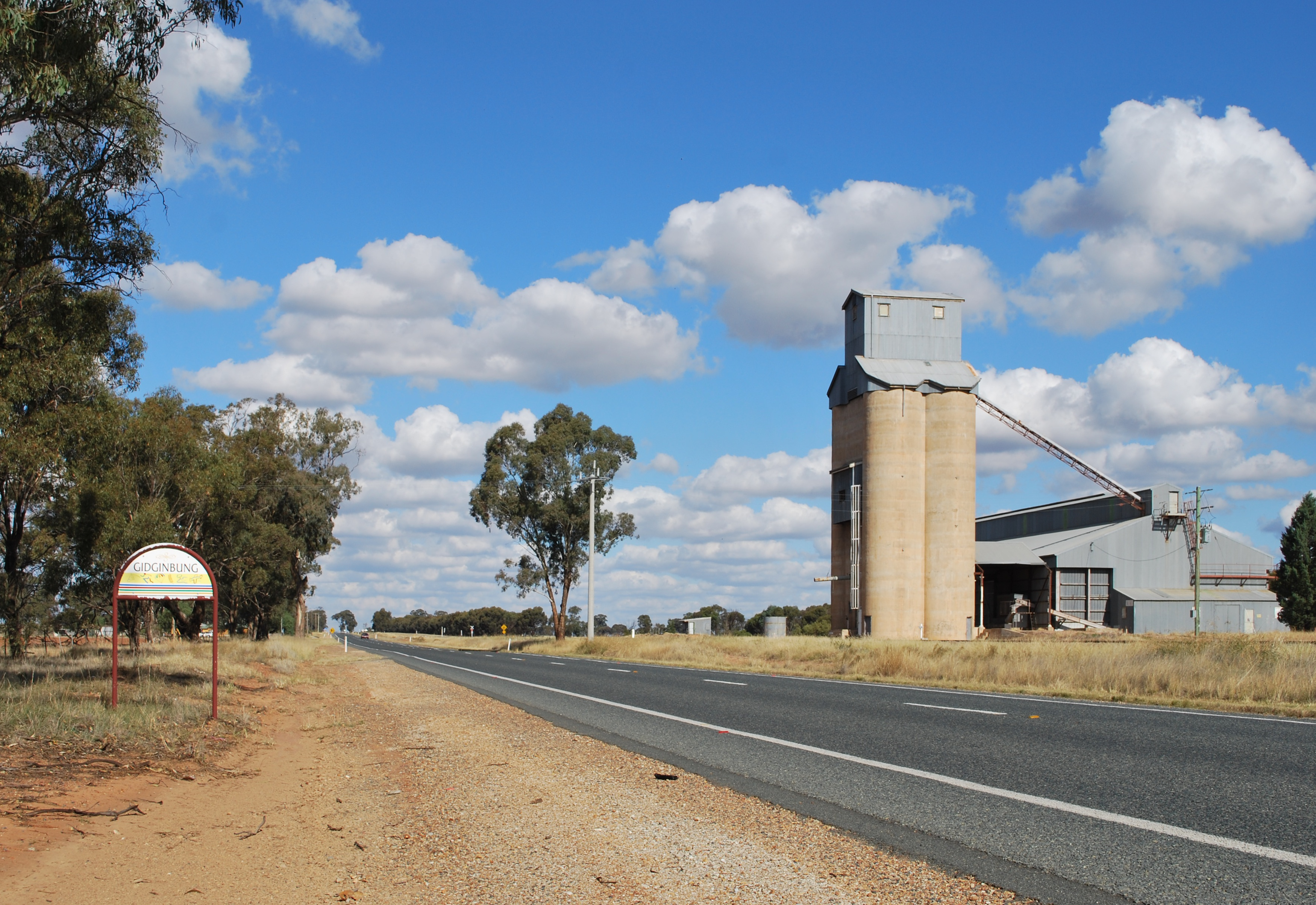
- Entering Gidginbung

- Coordinates: 34°20′01″S 147°31′34″E
- Population: 69 (SAL 2021)
- Postcode(s): 2666
- Elevation: 302 m (991 ft)
- Location: 18 km (11 mi) from Temora; 50 km (31 mi) from West Wyalong
- LGA(s): Temora Shire
- County: Bland
- State electorate(s): Cootamundra
- Federal division(s): Riverina

Gidginbung is a town community in the north eastern part of the Riverina and situated about 18 kilometres north west of Temora and 50 kilometres south east of West Wyalong.

Gidginbung Post Office opened on 1 October 1891 and closed in 1978.
