= Barmedman =

- Town
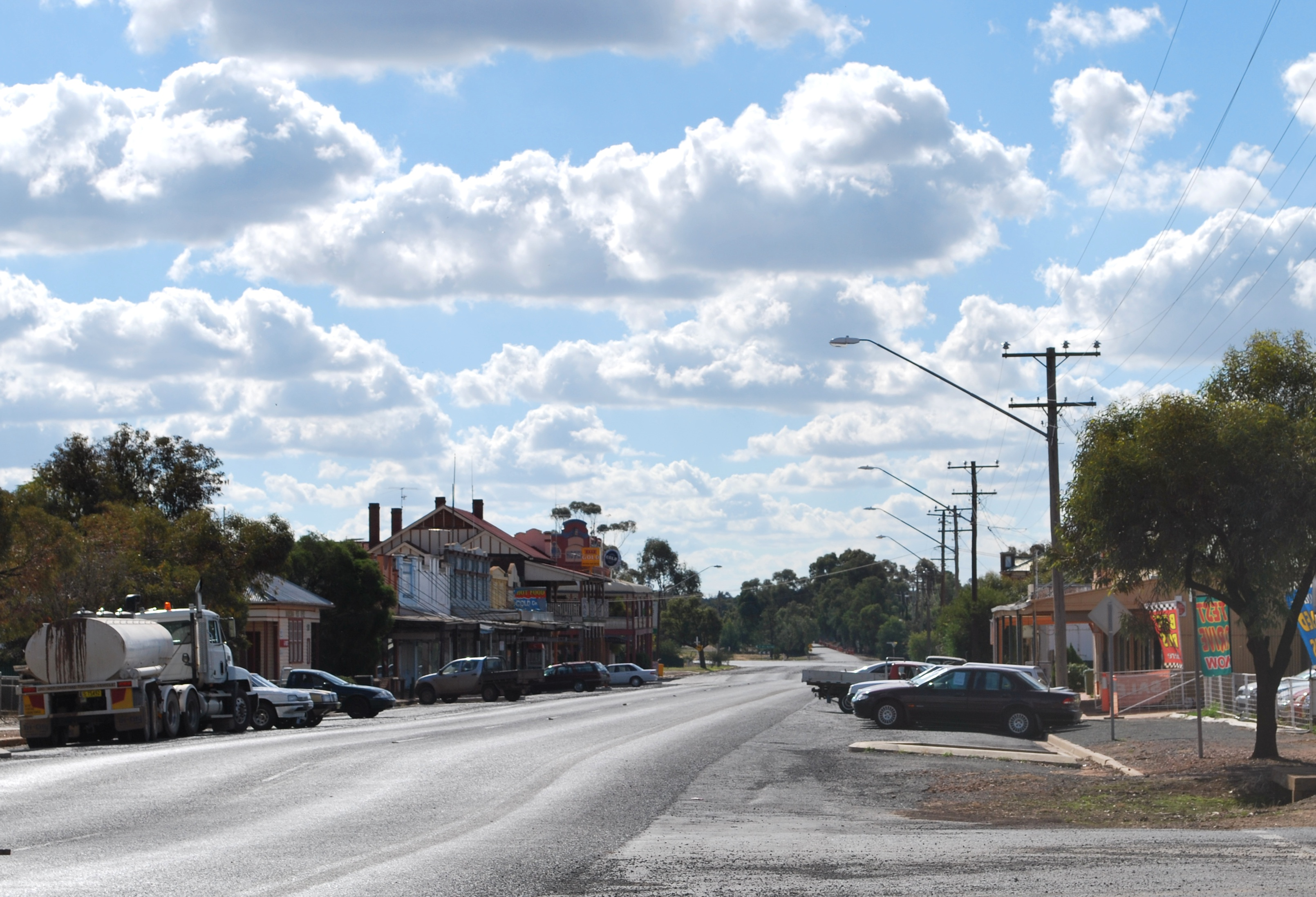
- Main street of Barmedman

- Coordinates: 34°09′0″S 147°23′0″E
- Country: Australia
- State: New South Wales
- LGA: Bland Shire Council
- Location: 35 km (22 mi) from West Wyalong; 457 km (284 mi) from Sydney

Government
  - State electorate: Cootamundra
  - Federal division: Parkes
- Elevation: 262 m (860 ft)

Population
  - Total: 212 (UCL 2021)
- Postcode: 2668

Barmedman is a rural village in the Bland Shire in the New South Wales state of Australia, located approximately half-way between West Wyalong and Temora. Barmedman began as a service centre for gold-mining operations in the area. Nowadays the local district has an agricultural economic base, including wheat and canola cropping and sheep grazing. It is the home of two large wheat silos with a combined capacity of over a million bushels. At the 2011 census, Barmedman had a population of 212. The township's name is derived from an Aboriginal word meaning 'long water'.

== History ==
=== Barmedman pastoral run ===
In December 1849 the 'Barmedman' pastoral run, leased by John Cartwright, was described as having an estimated area of 36,000 acres with a grazing capacity of about 1,000 cattle. Within its boundaries was a water-source called the Barmedman Waterhole.

In August 1872 the Robertson brothers purchased 'Barmedman' station from A. G. Jones. At about the same time the brothers also purchased 'West Bland Plains' and 'Bland West' stations. One of the brothers, Lachlan Robertson, resided on 'Barmedman' station until his death in 1916.

=== Barmedman Reefs ===
In 1874 newspaper reports began to appear of gold-mining operations at a location called Barmedman Reefs, on the 'Barmedman' pastoral run 70 miles north-west of Young. The location was described as "a hill of no great altitude" making up an area of 10 acres "with hardly perceptible slopes on either side". Seams (or reefs) of gold-bearing quartz had been found within the formation which consisted of layers of slate and sandstone.

Quartz reef mining was carried out by using crushing machines which reduced the quartz to a fine dust, after which it was mixed with water and passed into 'ripple tables' where gold could be extracted by means of plates coated with mercury (which amalgamated with any gold fragments). Mining with crushing machines required a workforce to dig the shafts, extract the rock and operate the machinery. Miners operating at the Barmedman Reefs in early 1874 were the partnership of Mayne, Marr, and the Quail brothers and also M'Garr "and party".

In about May 1878 a public-house opened at Barmedman Reefs, owned and managed by Mrs. Maher. Jackson's store opened shortly afterwards at the locality. Another business at Barmedman Reefs was carried out by Christopher M'Neven, operating as a blacksmith and wheelwright. Mrs. Maher's hotel at Barmedman Reefs, as well as a store also owned by her, were burned down in January 1881; it was reported that "Mrs. Maher and the children were barely outside when the roof fell with a loud crash".

=== Barmedman township ===
The locality was known as Barmedman Reefs (or Barmedman Reef) until the early 1880s. From about 1882, after much of the attention had been taken away by the gold-rush at nearby Temora, the name of the township increasingly began to be shortened to Barmedman.

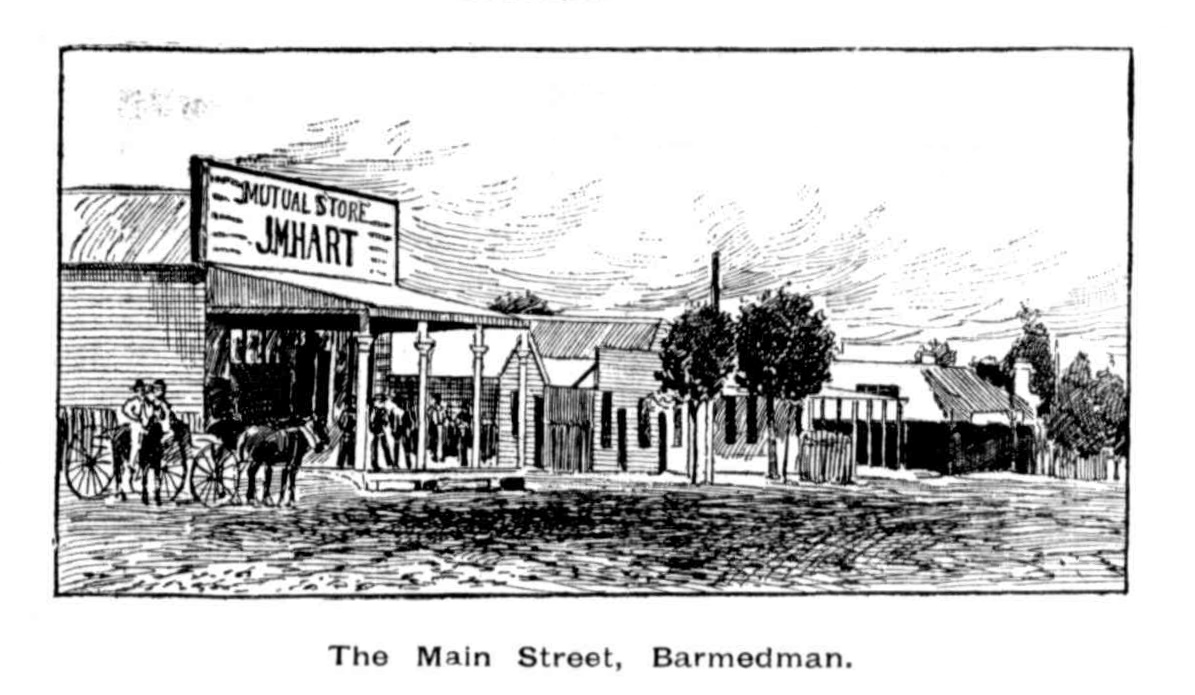
Barmedman main street - illustration published in Australian Town and Country Journal, 7 April 1894.

By early 1882 there were two hotels operating at Barmedman: the West Coast of New Zealand Hotel owned by Alexander Constantine (who had been a successful miner in the district) and the Barmedman Hotel owned by John Birnie. By the end of 1882 a third hotel had opened in the town, the Melbourne Club Hotel owned by John Cohen.

In August 1882 a portion of Crown Land was set aside by the New South Wales Department of Lands "as a site for the town of Barmedman". A public school was opened at Barmedman in July 1883.

In May 1891 it was reported that "within a radius of 25 miles from Barmedman there are 200 families, holding in the aggregate 272,000 acres of conditionally purchased land". After a period of intense lobbying by the local Farmers' Association in August 1892 the Minister of Lands approved the establishment of a Lands Office at Barmedman.

In September 1892 a report was published regarding the economics of crushing the gold-bearing stone at Barmedman, claiming that "miners must get good stone" in order to pay the high price "for carting and crushing". Despite that "some miners are getting a very good living by going through the old workings". The correspondent stated Barmedman's population "is about 300, and there is a good opening for a butcher and baker".

In April 1894 it was reported that Barmedman had a population of 400 residents, with a public school "under the supervision of Mr. Walsh" with "an attendance roll of 100 children".

In June 1903 a railway connection between Temora and Barmedman was opened for the carriage of goods. The continuance of the line from Barmedman to Wyalong was opened in November the same year. The final railway extension was opened in November 1917 between Wyalong and Cargelligo (Lake Cargelligo), which completed the Central Western branch line joining with the Main Southern Railway at Cootamundra. In January 1923 a railway line was opened which branched from the Lake Cargelligo line at Barmedman and terminated at Rankins Springs.

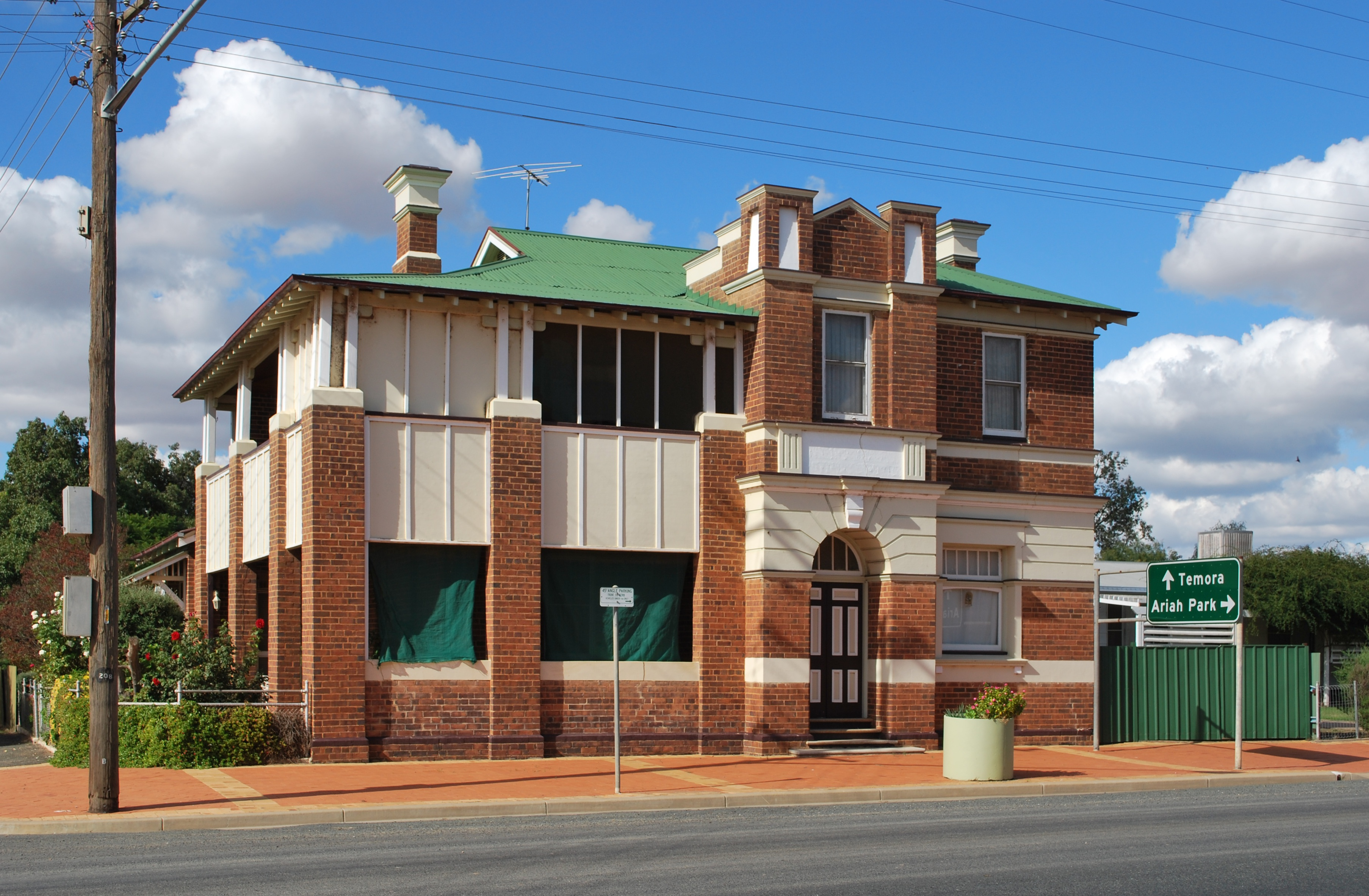
The former Commercial Bank at Barmedman, erected in 1924.

The opening of the branch line to Rankins Springs proved to be a boon for Barmedman, stimulating increased commercial activity in the township. In early 1924 the St. John's Parish Soldiers' Memorial Hall was completed and construction began on the two-storey Commercial Bank opposite the Queensland and Barmedman hotels.

In 1940 a sewerage system was completed for Barmedman township, at that time claimed to be "the smallest town in New South Wales to be granted a sewerage scheme". This was a significant achievement considering Barmedman's population "of approximately 500 residents" and the State Government's policy of not approving sewerage schemes "where the population did not number 1,500". The success of the original application to Government was attributed to the advocacy of Councillor A. Holland, the Shire President of Bland Shire Council. At about the same time Barmedman was connected with a water supply and "bulk electricity supply" from Burrinjuck Dam.

In July 1945 the residents of Barmedman assembled to welcome Sergeant Reg Rattey who had been awarded the Victoria Cross for gallantry on Bougainville. Rattey, who was born at Barmedman, arrived by train from Sydney. His parents and siblings boarded the train at Reefton prior to its arrival at Barmedman. A brass band from West Wyalong led a procession from Barmedman station to the centre of town "where three lorries were parked close together" to form a platform which was draped with flags. During the speeches Rattey "looked uncomfortable" as the speakers "extolled his heroism". He "appeared lost for words" when asked to respond; after a long pause he said "Thanks for booming me up", before adding "the boys still up on Bougainville are doing just as good a job as I did, and getting no recognition". In August 1945, after a representation on behalf of Barmedman residents from the local member of parliament, the NSW Government "granted a farm" to Reg Rattey of 2432 acres near Lake Cowell.

== Rugby league ==
Although the town no longer has a team, rugby league is the most popular sport in Barmedman.

In February 1911 West Wyalong joined the New South Wales Rugby League, the first inland town in NSW to do so. The team was named 'The Goldfields' and from April 1911 they began to play teams from Sydney, with the teams travelling to and fro by train. In April 1912 the Goldfields team travelled to Barmedman to play an exhibition match against a local team, "where the thirteen-a-side game has secured many converts". By the following June players from Barmedman and Ariah Park were selected in the Goldfields team to play a combined Sydney team at West Wyalong. During the 1913 season the Barmedman team played the Goldfields team on a number of occasions. After a game in July 1913 when Barmedman was defeated 24 to nil the local Wyalong newspaper published this helpful advice: "[The] Barmedman team should study up the Rules, especially on off-side play, which will prevent them from being penalised so often, and another point, when the scrum-half puts the ball in the scrum he should retire behind his pack, and not rush around to collar the opposing scrum-half before the ball is out of the pack".

The Barmedman rugby league team has been described as the "mouse that roared" during the Maher Cup period from 1920 to 1971. The Maher Cup was a district challenge competition, with the trophy held by the winner of each successive match. On statistical evidence alone the sporting record of the Barmedman Maroons is not particularly impressive, having won just 34 of their 106 games in the Maher Cup competition. There were, however, periods when the Barmedman team held the cup against teams from townships with far larger populations. Barmedman's first Maher Cup success was in 1929 with a team "claimed to be composed entirely of local players", after which they held the cup for five successive challenges. In April 1955, a week after Barmedman had defeated Boorowa to win back the trophy, the Barmedman team defeated Junee by 72 to 3 in their first defence, "the biggest margin ever in Maher Cup football". The Barmedman Maroons were notable for the fanaticism of their supporters and attracted renowned players to captain-coach, including George Mason, Tom Kirk, Keith Gittoes and Ron ('Dookie') Crowe.

== Aspects of the town ==
The Barmedman Mineral Pool is located on the edge of town. The large pool originated as a flooded gold-mine and contains water with a high mineral content, fed by groundwater from an aquifer and is reputed to have therapeutic effects. Located within a four hectare reserve the pool is surrounded by shady grassed areas, with facilities such as barbecues and change rooms. Barmedman Mineral Pool is open from mid-October to the end of March and admission is by donation. The Pool may be empty at times.

The annual Barmedman Show is held every year on the first Saturday in September. The event began in September 1907 with the inaugural Ploughing Carnival and Horse Parade "held on Mr Doel's farm, 2½ miles from Barmedman", attended by 700 people. The event featured ploughing matches and horse judging events, as well as bread-baking, fresh butter and home-made jam competitions. A newspaper report of the event predicted "that it will eventually merge into a full-blown show". The Barmedman Show Society proudly carries on that heritage, using "since 1907" in their advertising. In more recent times the Show features carnival rides, equestrian events, the 'Beaut Ute' competition, and includes a luncheon pavilion and numerous arts, crafts, cookery, agricultural and school exhibitions. The Barmedman Show was cancelled in 2020 due to COVID-19 pandemic restrictions.

Barmedman also hosts a Modified Tractor Pull competition, usually held in October. The event features customised tractors pulling a weighted sled. The vehicles compete in various modification categories: mini-modified, open-modified, limited, super-modified tractors and two-wheel drive trucks. The popular Modified Tractor Pull has additional attractions such as children's rides, trade stalls, and a variety of other entertainment.

== Publications ==
- McLaren, Beth, ed. (1974). Trials and triumphs : Barmedman, 1874-1974. Barmedman, NSW: Barmedman Centenary Executive Committee.
