= Temora Shire =

Coordinates: 34°26′S 147°32′E

- Local government area
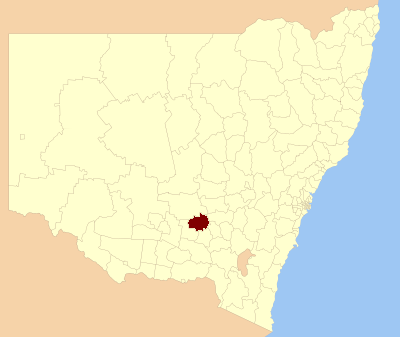
- Location in New South Wales

- Interactive map of Temora Shire
- Country: Australia
- State: New South Wales
- Region: Riverina
- Established: 1980
- Council seat: Temora

Government
  - Mayor: Rick Firman ()
  - State electorate: Cootamundra
  - Federal division: Riverina

Area
  - Total: 2,802 km^{2} (1,082 sq mi)

Population
  - Totals: 6,110 (2016 census); 6,274 (2018 est.)
  - Density: 2.1806/km^{2} (5.648/sq mi)
- Website: Temora Shire
LGAs around Temora Shire
Bland	Bland	Weddin
Coolamon	Temora Shire	Hilltops
Coolamon	Junee	Cootamundra-Gundagai

Temora Shire is a local government area in the Riverina region of New South Wales, Australia. It is on Burley Griffin Way. The Shire was created on 1 January 1981 via the amalgamation of Narraburra Shire and the Municipality of Temora.

It includes the town of Temora and the small towns of Springdale, Sebastapol, Ariah Park, Gidginbung, Narraburra and Wallundry.

The mayor of Temora Shire is Rick Firman.

== Heritage listings ==
The Temora Shire has a number of heritage-listed sites, including:

- Temora, Cootamundra-Griffith railway: Temora railway station

== Council ==
=== Current composition and election method ===
Temora Shire Council is composed of nine councillors elected proportionally as a single ward. All councillors are elected for a fixed four-year term of office.

== Election results ==
=== 2024 ===
2024 New South Wales local elections: Temora
Party	Candidate	Votes	%	±%
Independent National	Rick Firman (elected)	1,736	42.8	−3.7
Independent	Anthony Irvine (elected)	355	8.7	−1.4
Independent	Nigel Judd (elected)	348	8.6	+2.5
Independent National	Graham Sinclair (elected)	327	8.1	+4.1
Independent	Belinda Bushell (elected)	214	5.3	+0.8
Independent	Brenton Hawken (elected)	189	4.7	
Independent	Narelle Djukic (elected)	184	4.5	
Independent	Paul Mahon (elected)	122	3.0	
Independent	Mitchell Farlow	102	2.5	
Independent	Kenneth Smith (elected)	99	2.4	+0.1
Independent	Robert Matthews	97	2.4	
Independent	Sigrid Carr	89	2.2	
Independent	Philip Bleyer	80	2.0	
Independent	Dean McCrae	71	1.8	
Independent	Martin Bushby	47	1.2	
Total formal votes		4,060	97.2	
Informal votes		115	2.8	
Turnout		4,175	89.6	

=== 2016 ===
2016 New South Wales local elections: Temora
Party	Candidate	Votes	%	±%
Independent National	Rick Firman (elected 1)	2,277	59.67	
Independent National	Graham Sinclair (elected 2)	162	4.25	
Independent	Lindy Reinhold (elected 3)	198	5.19	
Independent	Nigel Judd (elected 4)	197	5.16	
Independent	Max Oliver (elected 5)	110	2.88	
Independent	Claire McLaren (elected 6)	207	5.42	
Independent	Kenneth Smith (elected 7)	138	3.62	
Independent	Dale Wiencke (elected 8)	97	2.54	
Independent	Dennis Sleigh (elected 9)	75	1.97	
Independent	Irene Broad	78	2.04	
Independent	Les Buckley	85	2.23	
Independent	Jone Pavelic	70	1.83	
Independent	Trevor Colwill	47	1.23	
Independent	Andrew Robbins	30	0.79	
Independent	Garath Otley	31	0.81	
Independent	Chris Lasdauskas	14	0.37	
Total formal votes		3,816	97.45	
Informal votes		100	2.55	
Turnout		3,916	85.00	
