= Narriah Mountain =

Coordinates: 33°51′43″S 146°42′00″E

Highest point
- Elevation: 457 m (1,499 ft)

Naming
- English translation: Bare Place

Geography
- Location: NSW, Australia
- Topo map(s): Weethalle, NSW

Narriah Mountain is a former mountain in Australia. It is no longer considered a mountain, and is now a hill. It is located in the Bland Shire, New South Wales, in the south eastern part of Australia, 270 km (170 mi) north-west of Canberra, the national capital, near Weethalle, a small town. Narriah Mountain stands 457 metres (1,499 ft) above sea level.

The name 'Narriah' is thought to have come from an anglicised spelling of an aboriginal word meaning 'Bare Place'.

The terrain around Narriah Mountain is generally flat. Narriah Mountain is the highest point in the area. There are less than two people per square kilometre around Narriah Mountain.

Location of Narriah Mountain in Australia.

The surrounding area is almost completely deserted. The climate is cold-dry, semi-arid. The average temperature is 20 °C. The hottest month is January at 32 °C, and the coldest is July at 8 °C. The average precipitation is 547mm per year. The wettest month is February with 104mm of rainfall and the dryest is October, with 18mm.

Narriah Mountain

Climate chart (precipitation, max. and min. temperature)
J	F	M	A	M	J	J	A	S	O	N	D
40 43 20	104 39 18	63 35 14	24 28 12	48 20 6	67 13 5	40 12 3	32 16 4	41 22 8	18 30 12	35 39 14	35 40 17
- █ Average max. and min. temperatures in °C
- █ Precipitation totals in mm
Imperial conversion
J	F	M	A	M	J	J	A	S	O	N	D
1.6 109 68	4.1 102 64	2.5 95 57	0.9 82 54	1.9 68 43	2.6 55 41	1.6 54 37	1.3 61 39	1.6 72 46	0.7 86 54	1.4 102 57	1.4 104 63
- █ Average max. and min. temperatures in °F
- █ Precipitation totals in inches

== See also ==
- Weethalle
- West Wyalong
- Mt. Wycheproof
