= Weethalle =

- Town
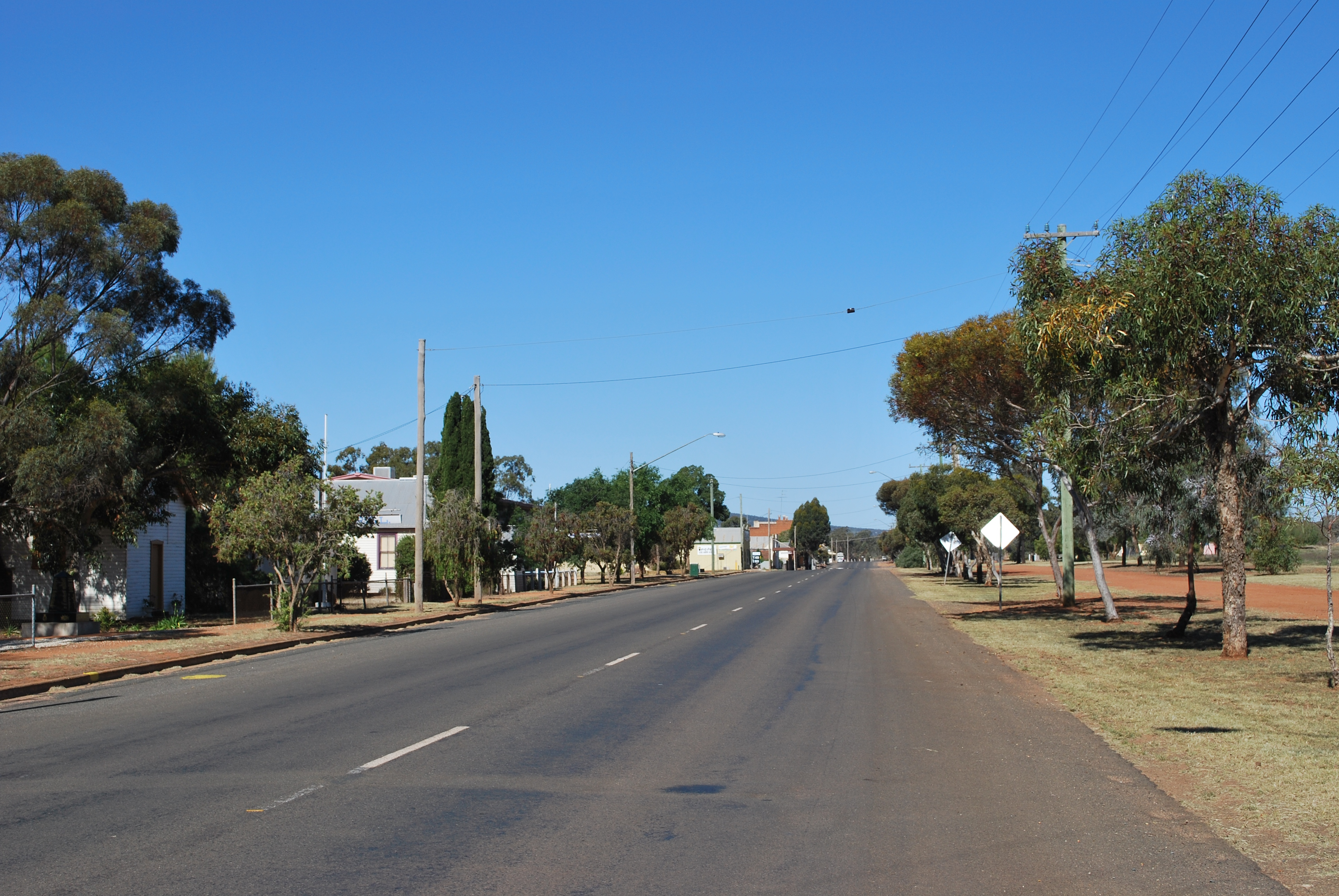
- Railway Street (Mid-Western Highway), the main street of Weethalle

- Coordinates: 33°52′32″S 146°37′30″E
- Country: Australia
- State: New South Wales
- LGA: Bland Shire
- Location: 526 km (327 mi) W of Sydney; 100 km (62 mi) NE of Griffith; 57 km (35 mi) W of West Wyalong

Government
  - State electorate: Cootamundra
  - Federal division: Parkes

Population
  - Total: 268 (SAL 2021)
- Postcode: 2669

Weethalle (/ˈwiːθæli/ WEE-thal-ee) is a town in the Central West region of New South Wales, Australia. The town is in the Bland Shire local government area and on the Mid-Western Highway, 526 kilometres (327 mi) west of the state capital, Sydney, and 100 kilometres (62 mi) north east of Griffith. At the 2011 census, Weethalle and the surrounding area had a population of 307. The name "Weethalle" is said to be an Aboriginal Australian word for drink. Locals refer to the town as the Wee or the Peethalle.

== History ==
The area now known as Weethalle lies on the traditional lands of the Wiradjuri people.

The Australian landmark known colloquially as Narriah Mountain is located in Weethalle, which is an elevation 483 metres above sea level.

The Weethalle area was set aside as homestead farms for returned soldiers in 1921. The Rankins Springs railway line was extended to Weethalle in 1922. Land clearing commenced and by 1923 the first wheat from the area was delivered to the Weethalle railway station.

By 1924, a site was surveyed for a village to service the surrounding farms with town allotment sales taking place the following year. A "skeleton" town was in existence by 1926, with "buildings in all states of construction" and "built mostly of wood". In the same year, a provisional school was established along with a branch of the Commercial Banking Company of Sydney.

An observer in 1928 described the growth of Weethalle as "remarkable" with the town having "sprung up in the night". In that year, a new hotel was built at a cost of £13,000. The hotel was the newest addition to a town that also boasted a bank, "2 stores ... butchers, bakers, hairdresser and tobacconist, several agents, a school, a doctor, a dance and picture hall, and a tri-weekly rail service."

== Sport ==
The most popular sport in Weethalle is rugby league. The town's team, the Weethalle Kangaroos, used to compete in the Group 17 Rugby League competition. Nowadays, the town's players play for either former rivals Rankins Springs in the Western Riverina Community Cup competition or for West Wyalong.

Weethalle also has a golf course and cricket facilities.

The town formerly had a combined Australian rules team with Rankins Springs competing in the Northern Riverina Football League.

== Gallery ==
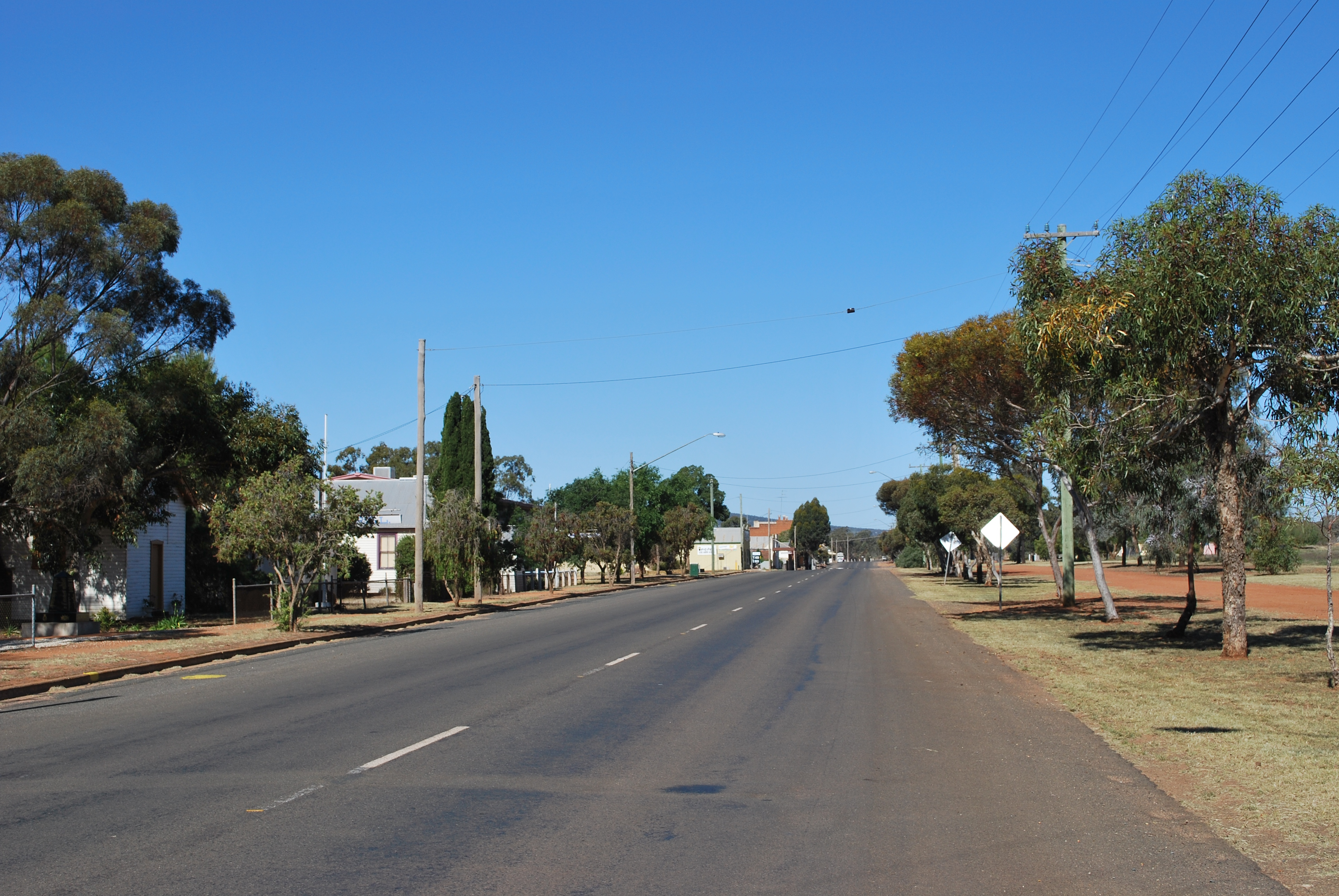
Weethalle Mid-Western Highway

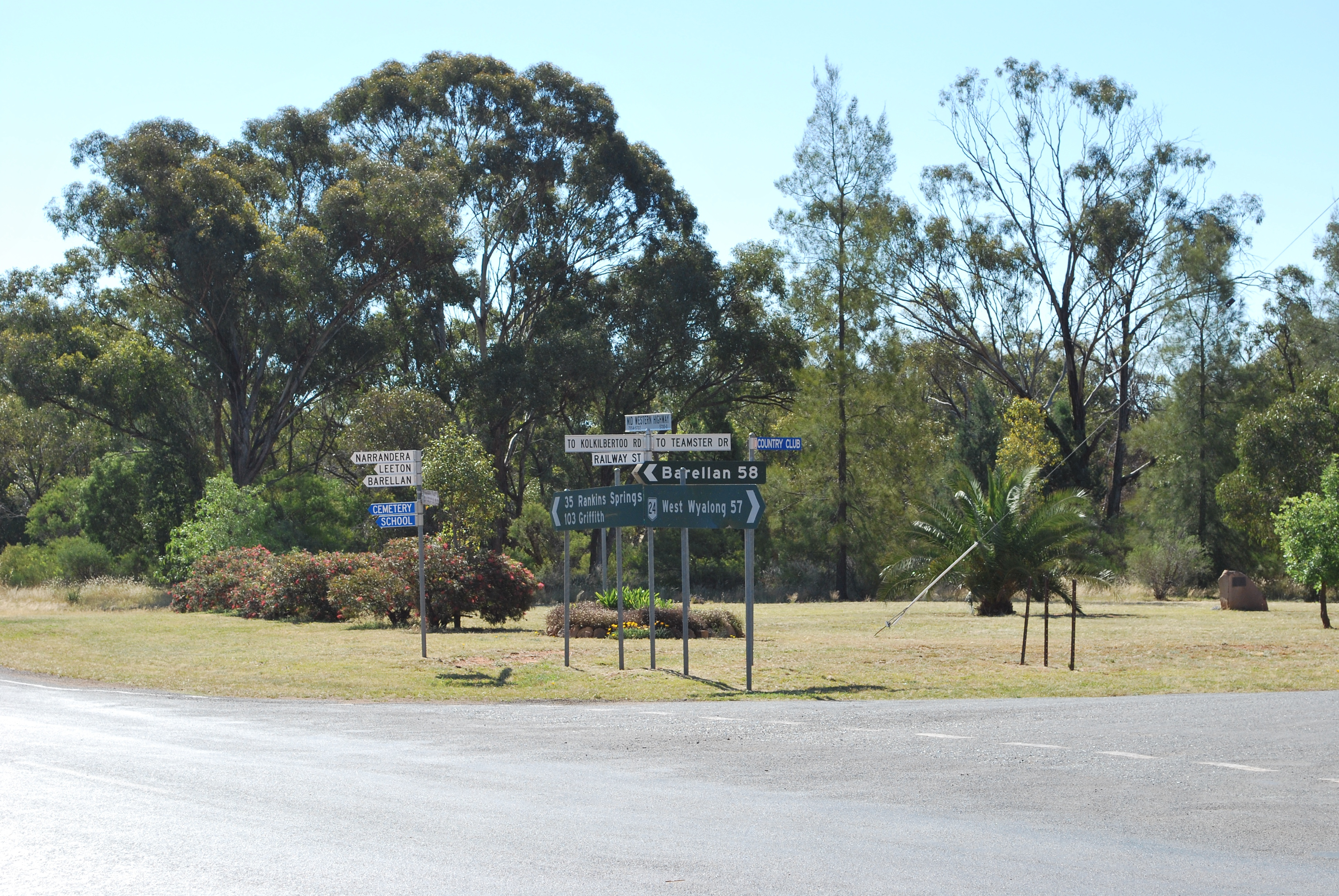
Weethalle Mid-Western Highway

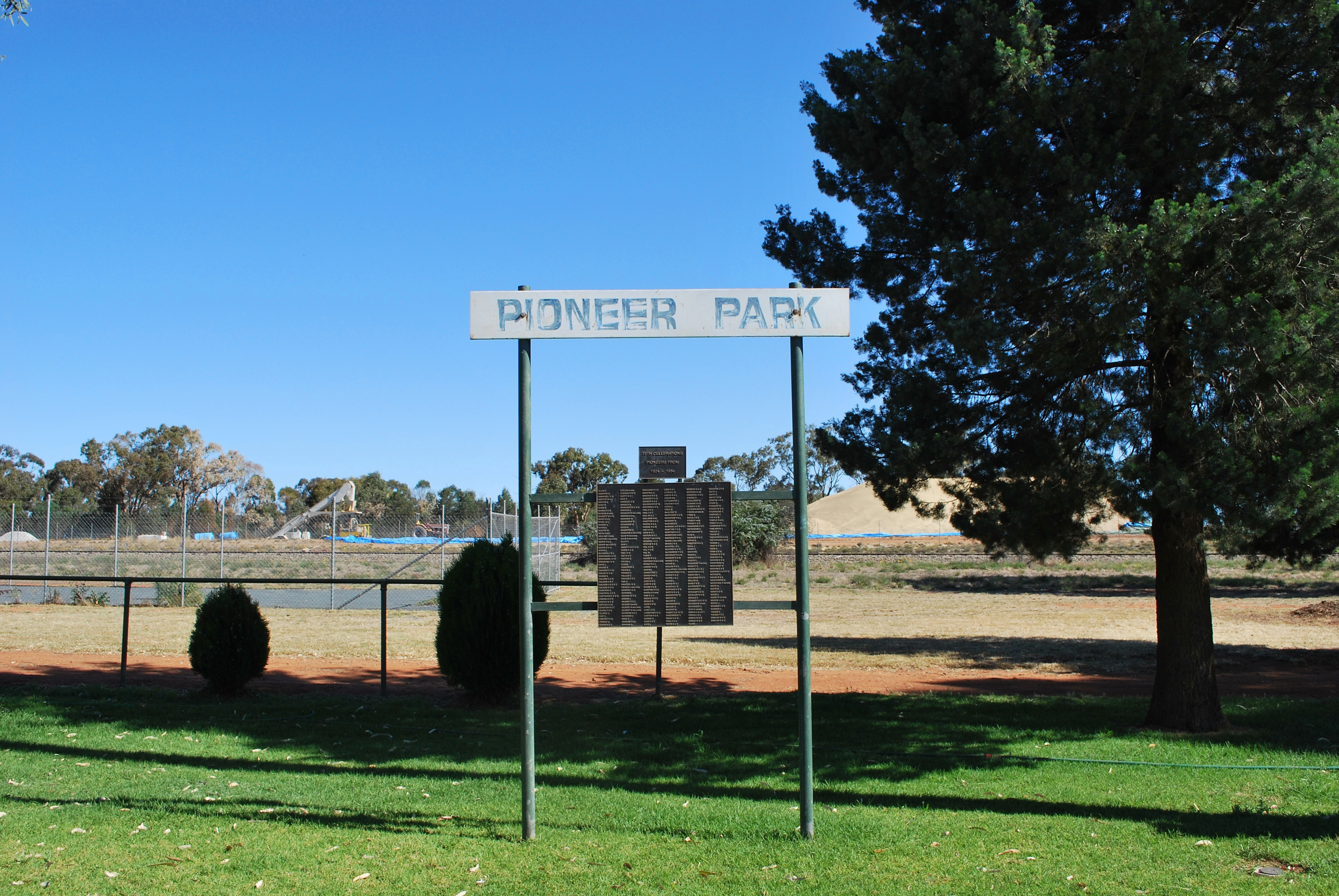
Pioneer Park

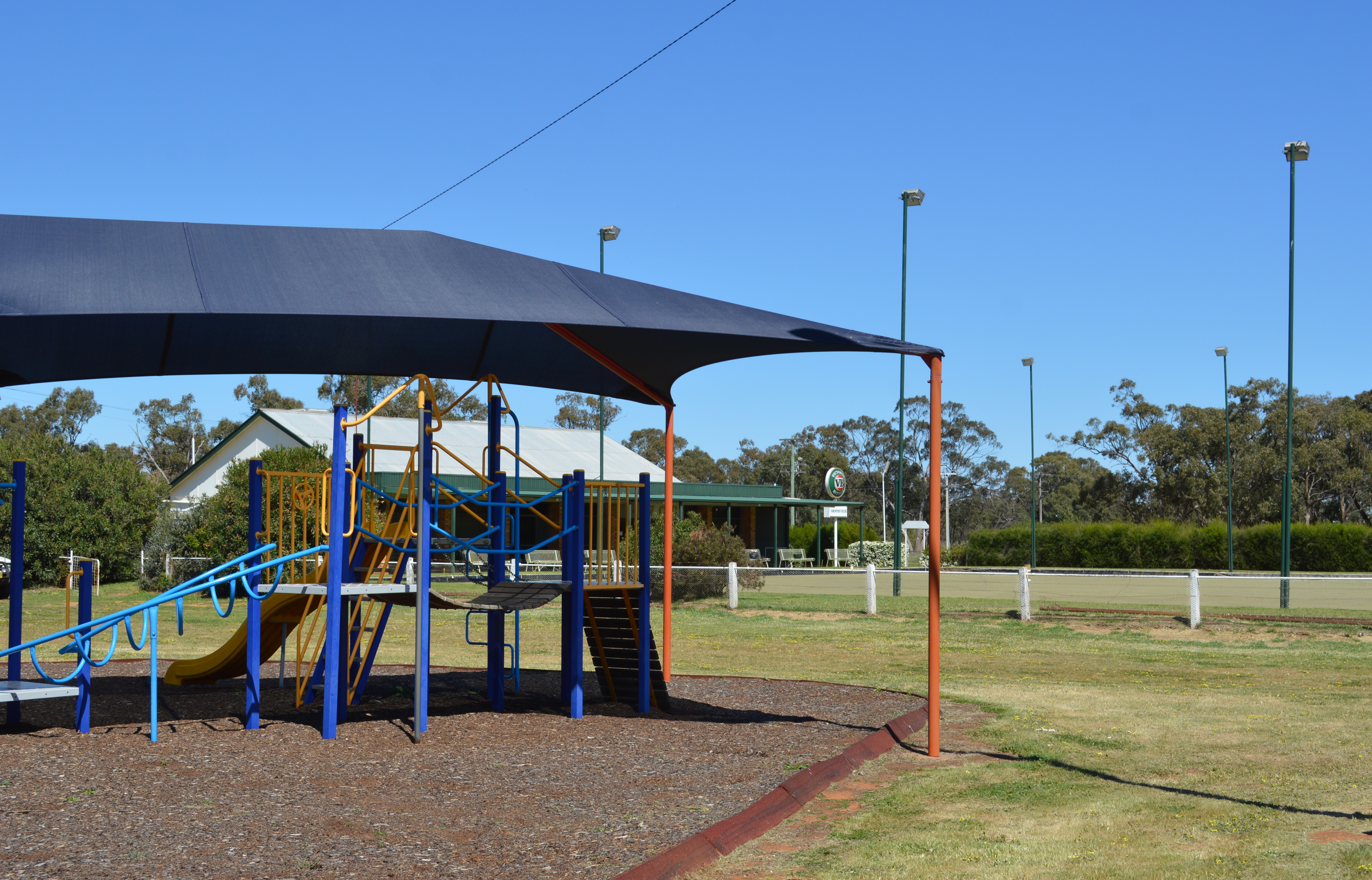
park

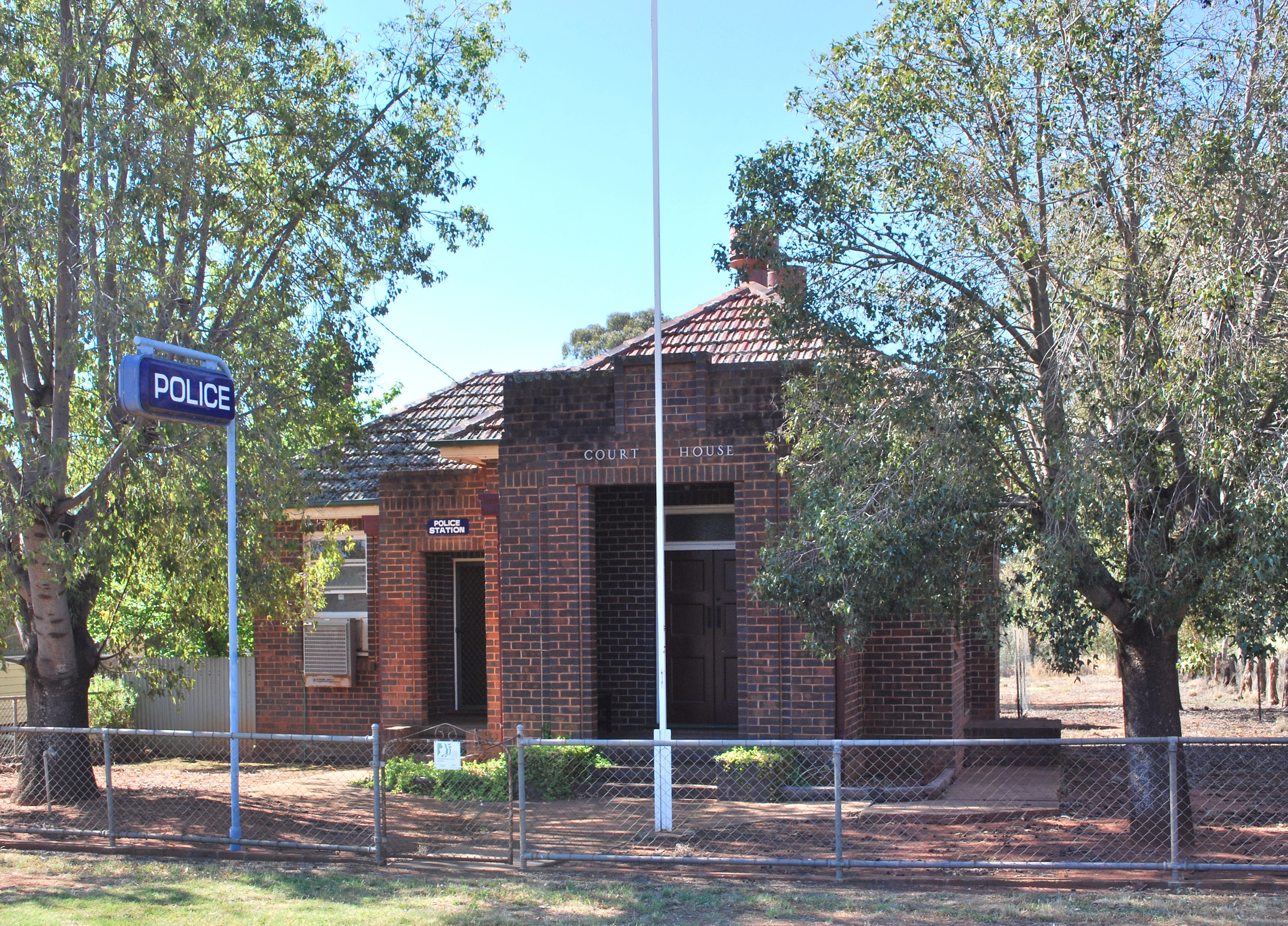
Court House

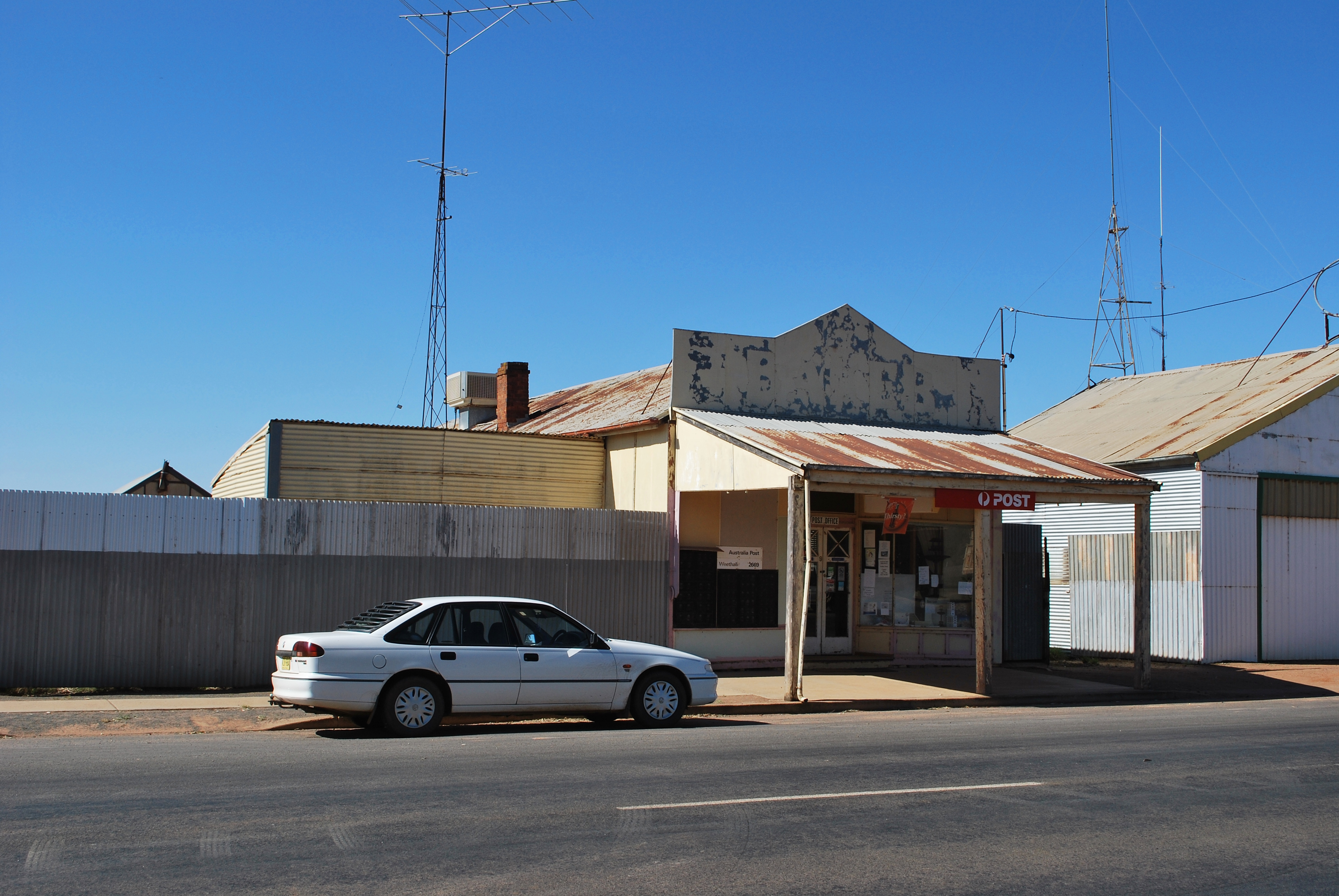
Post Office

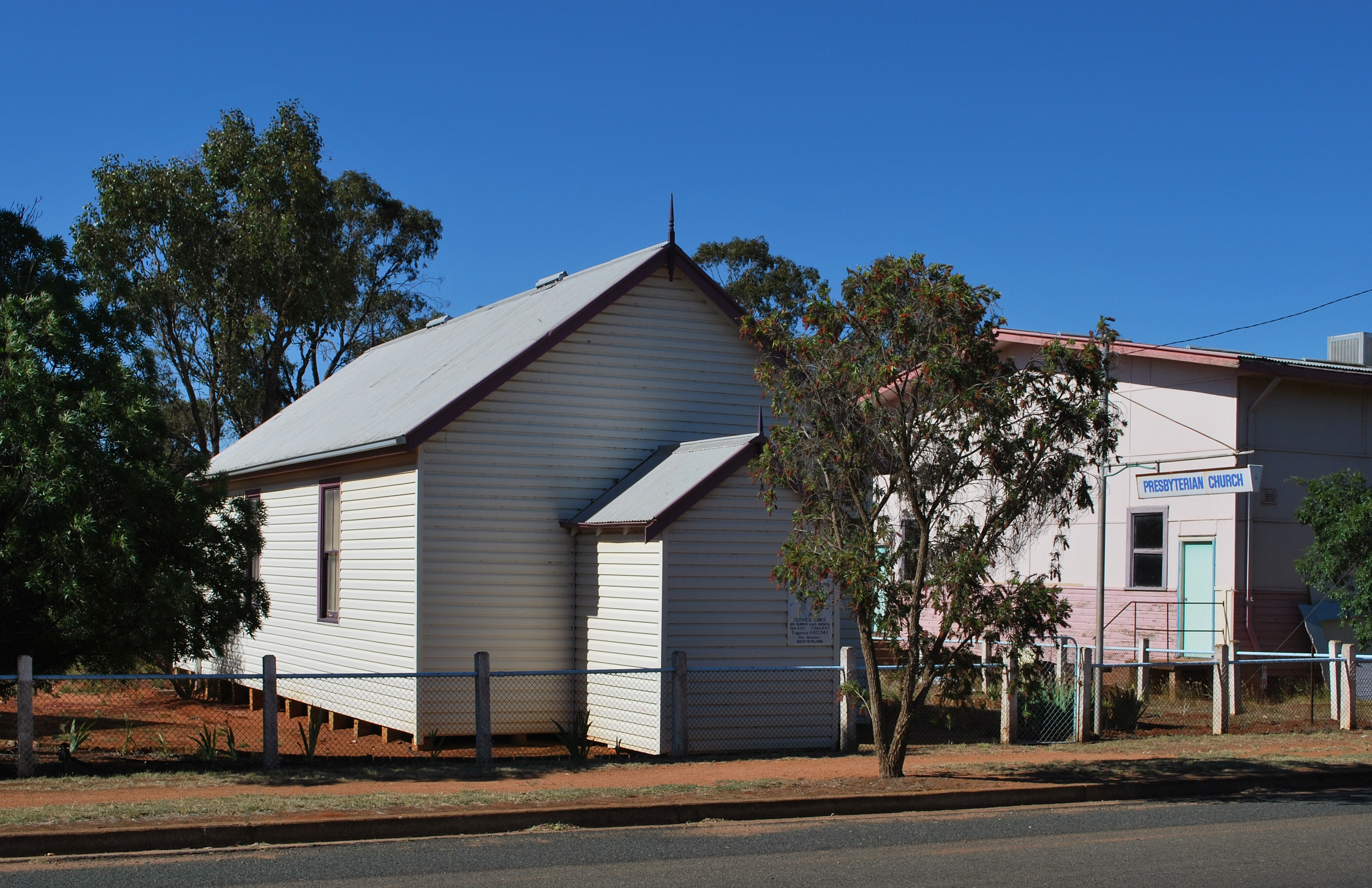
Presbyterian Church

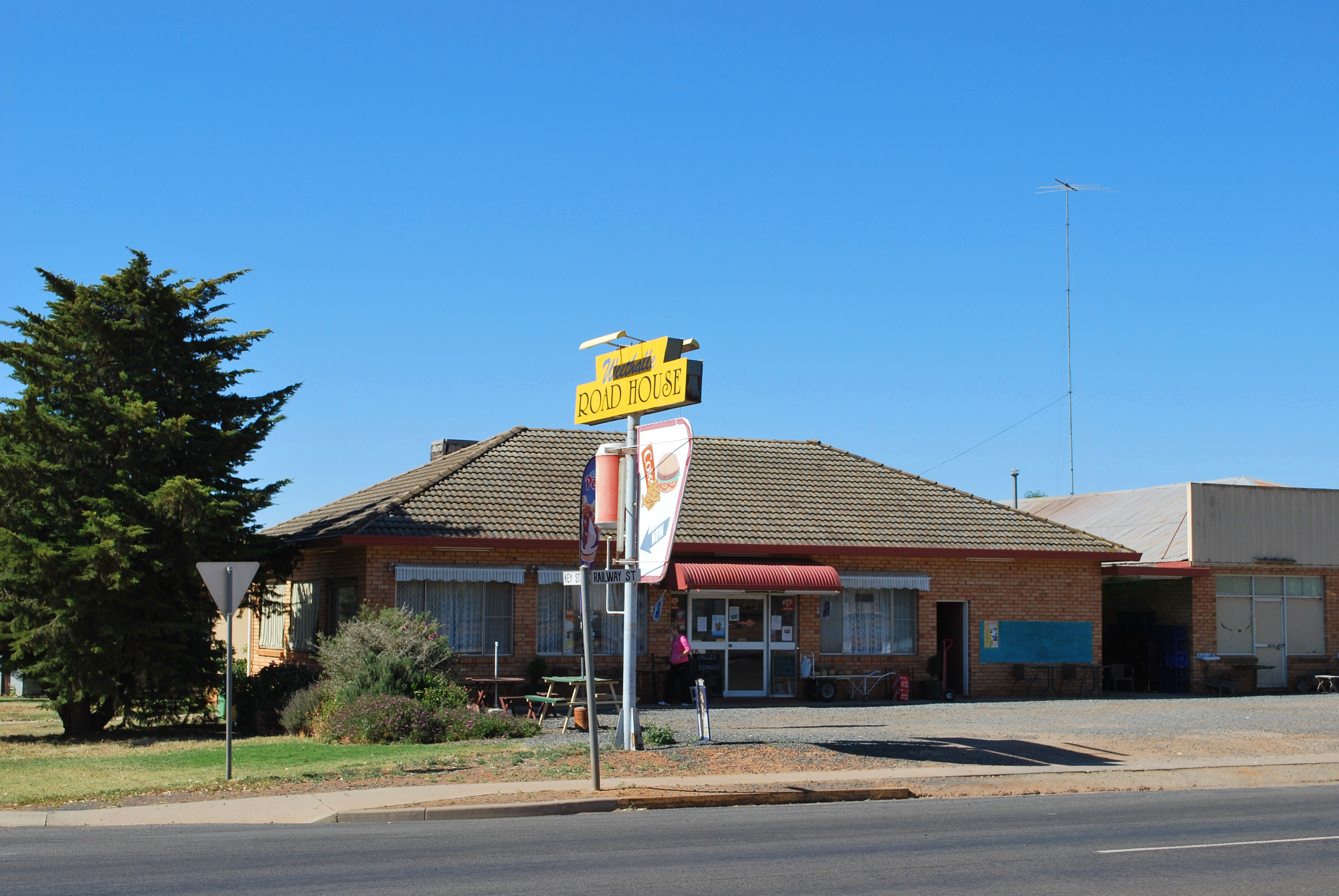
Weethalle Roadhouse

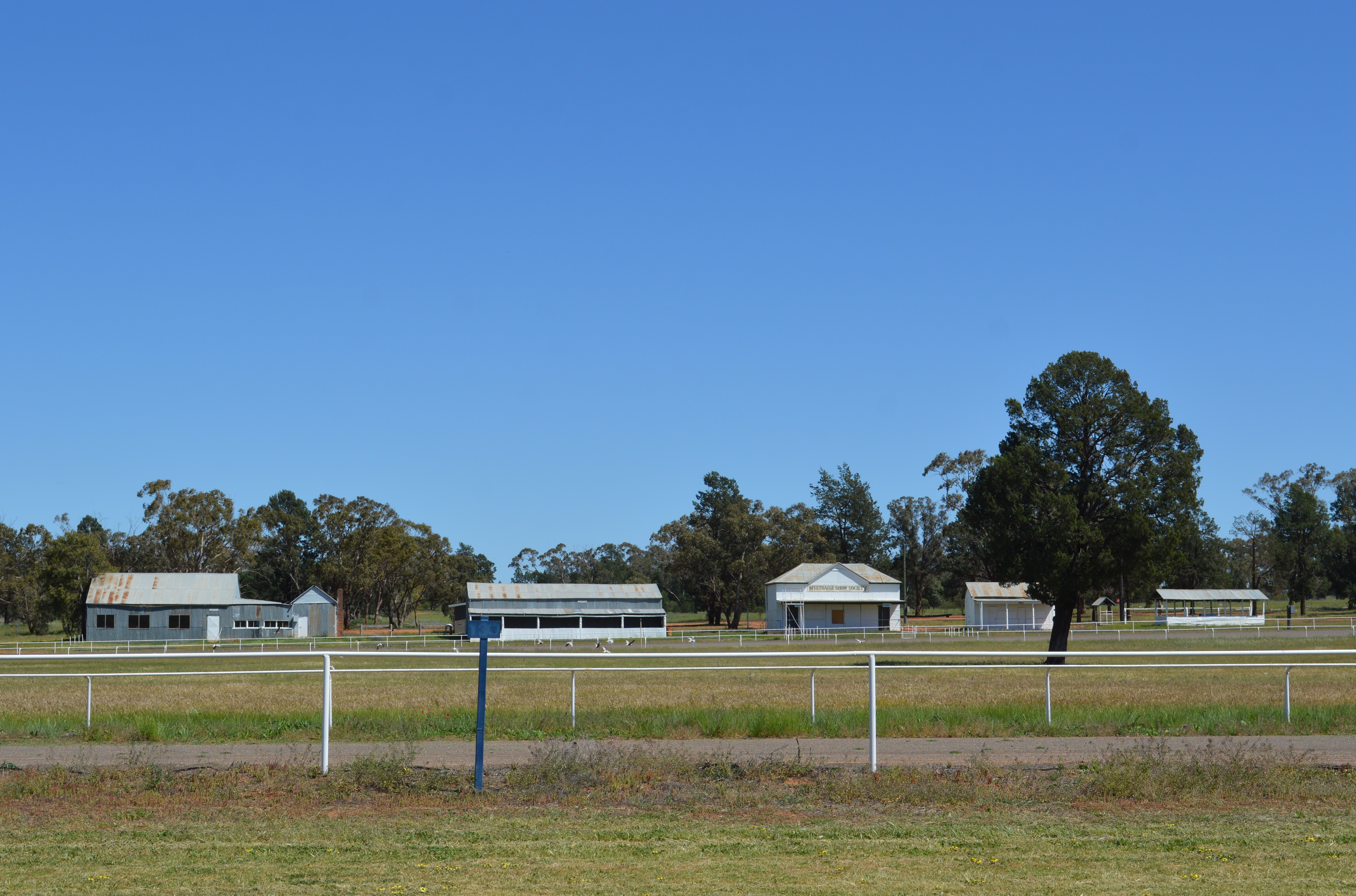
Weethalle Showgrounds

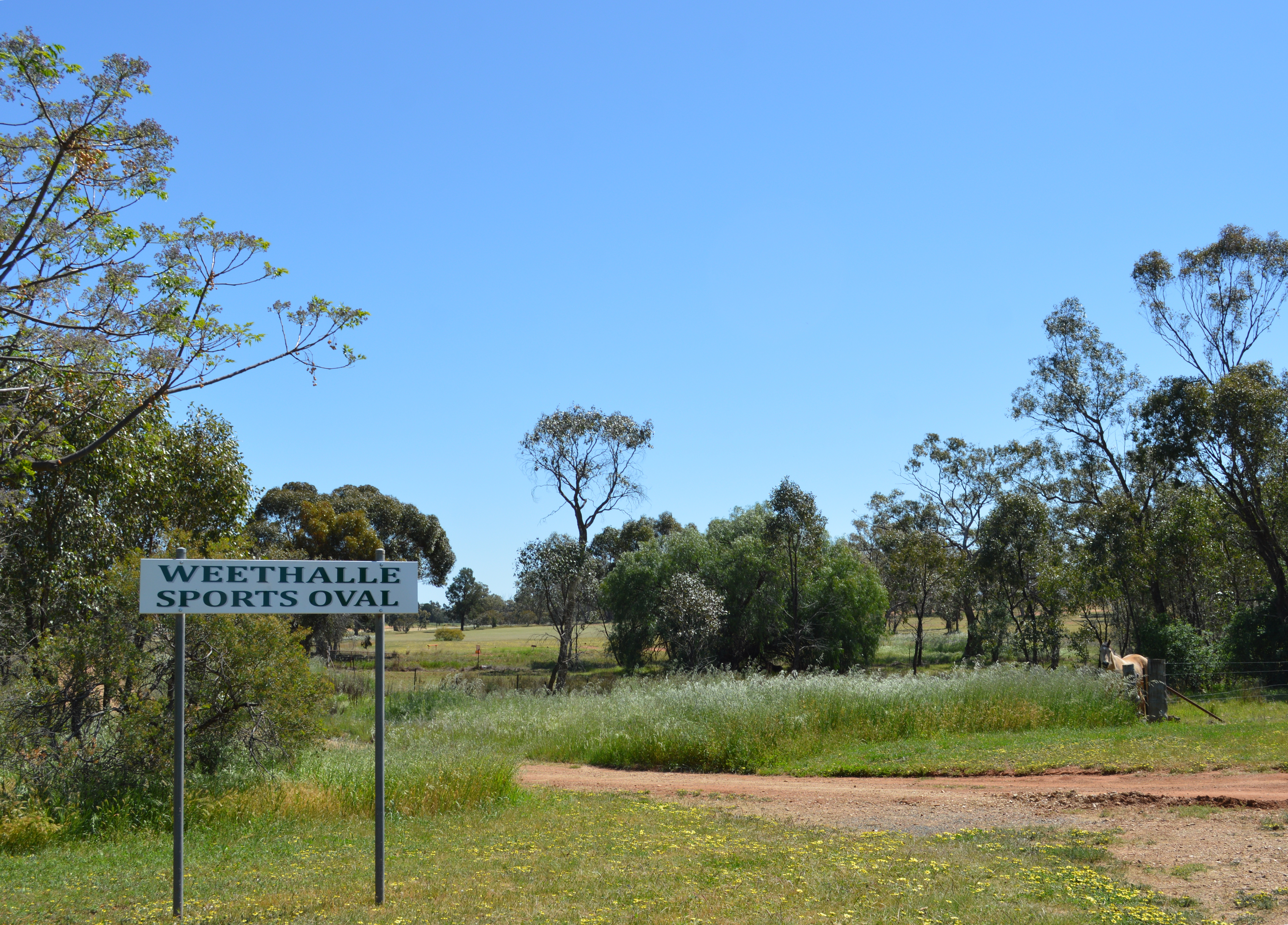
Sports Ground

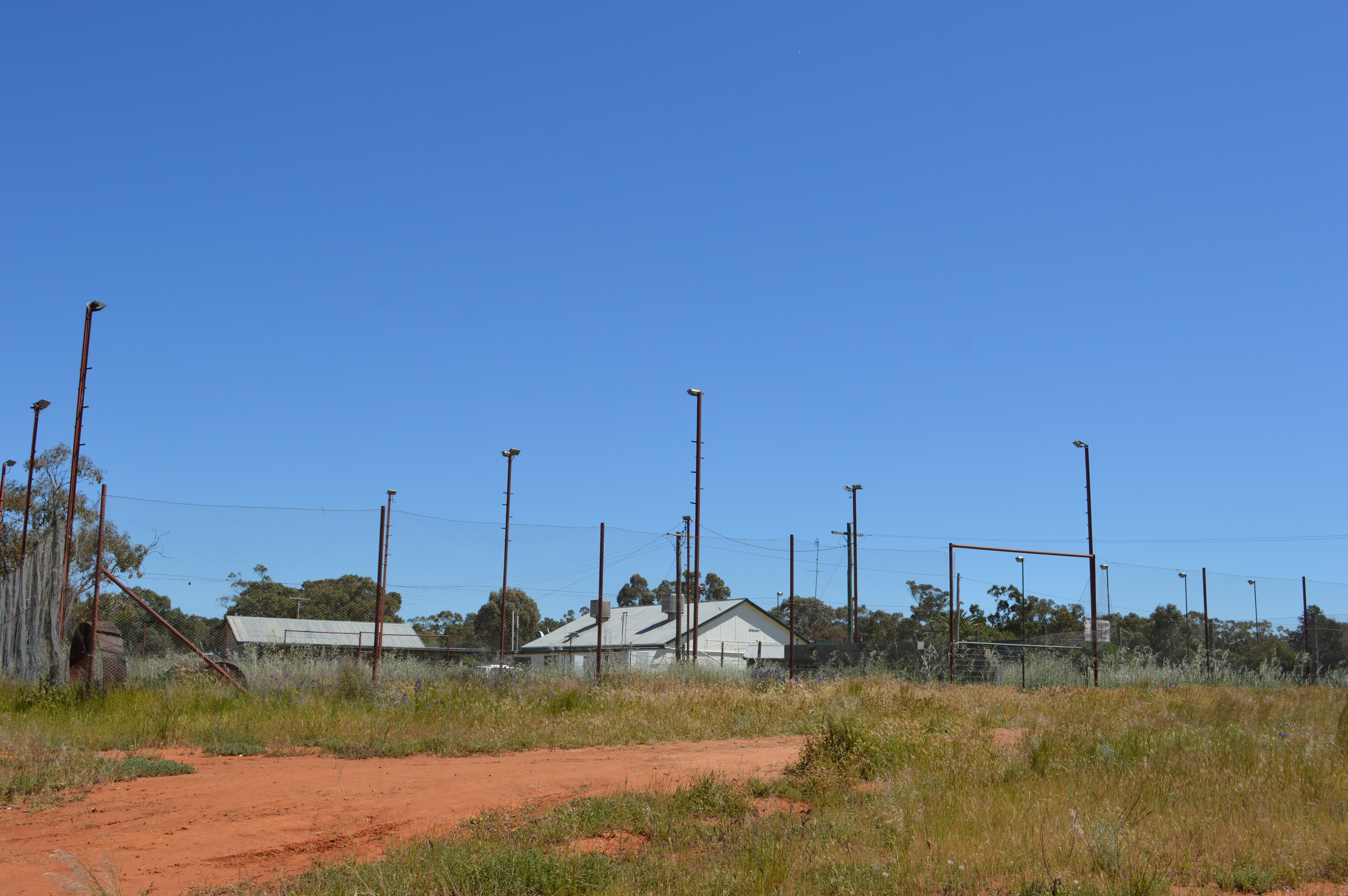
Tennis Courts

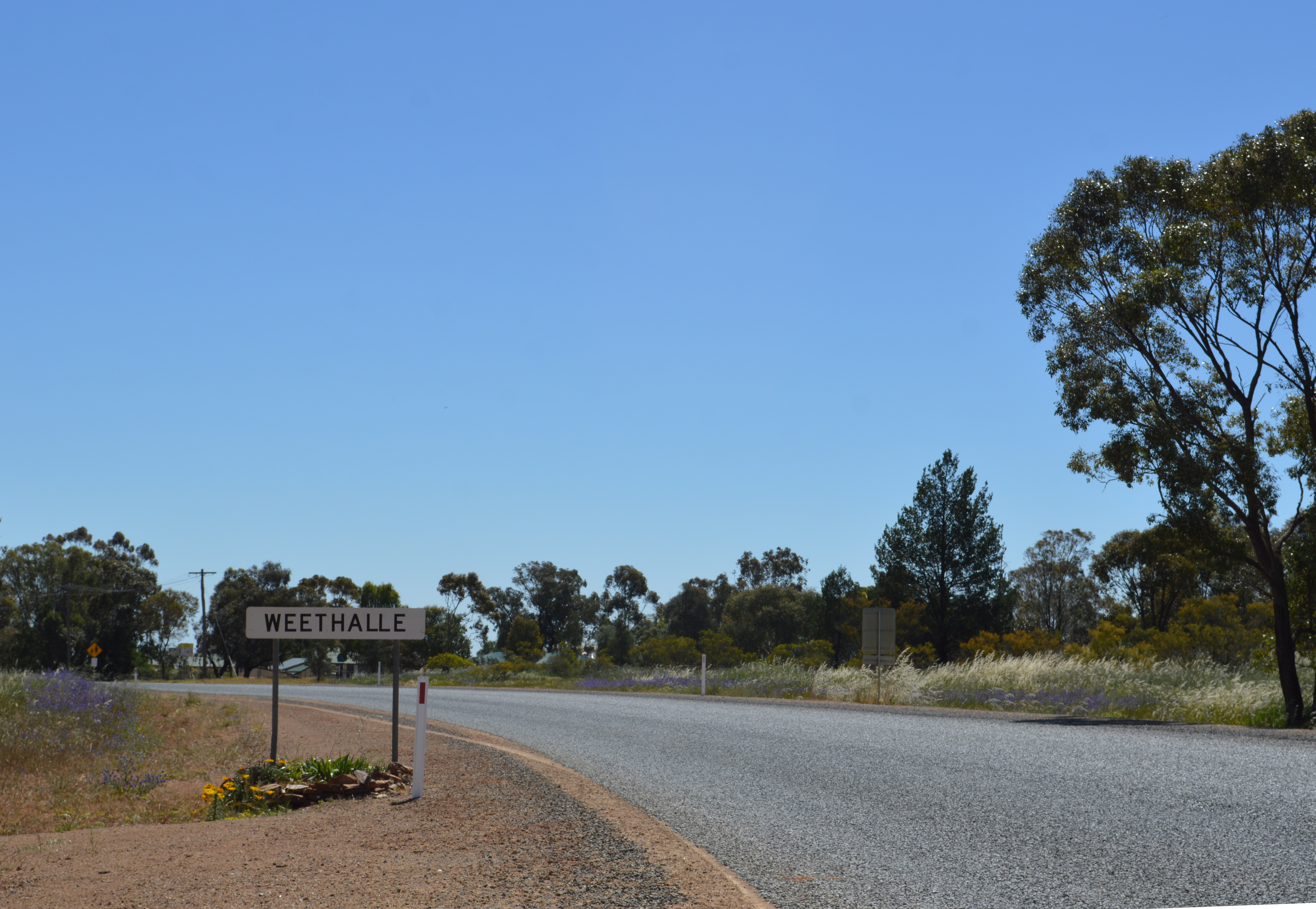
Weethalle Town Entry

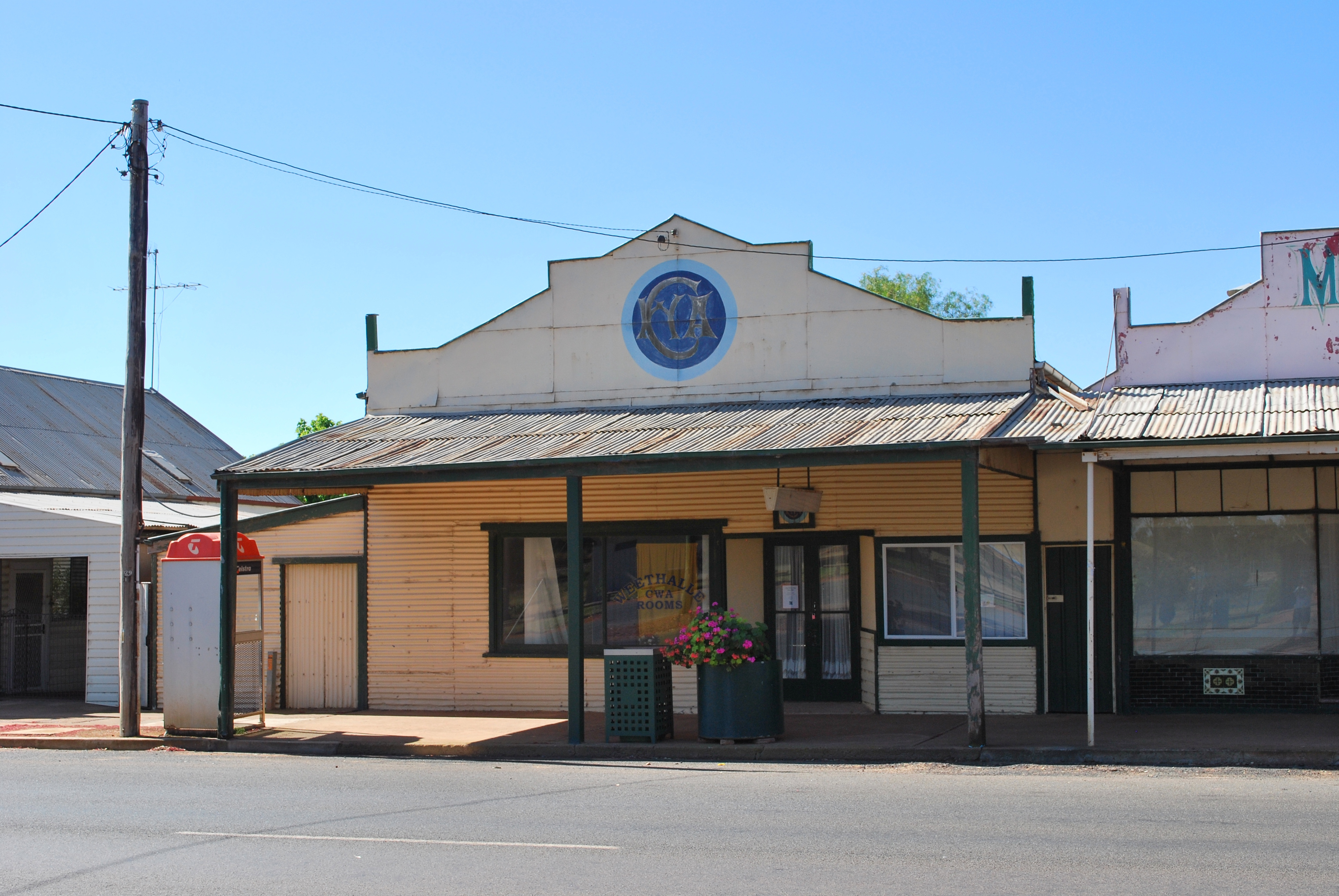
CWA Rooms

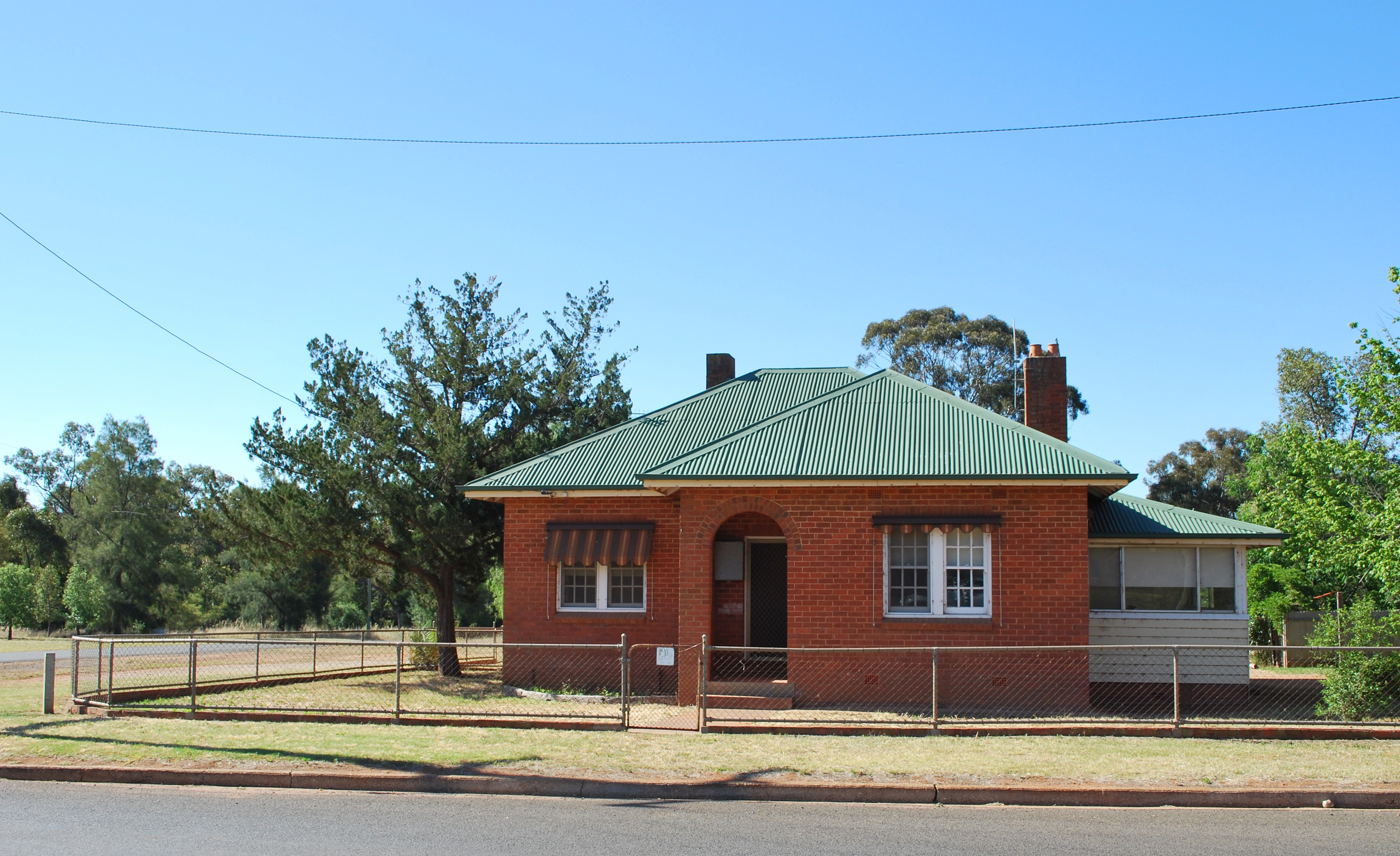
Street in Weethalle

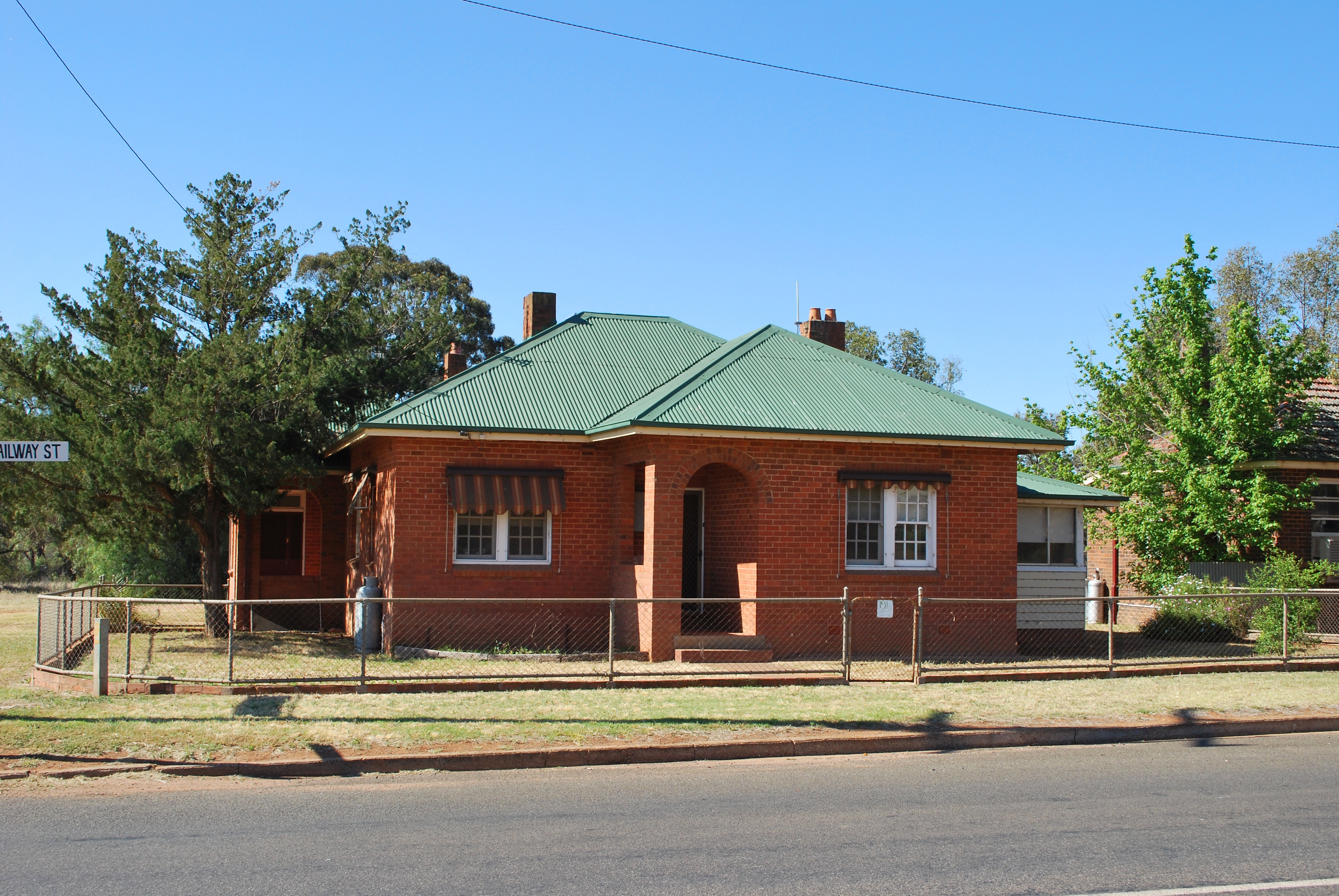
Weethalle Street

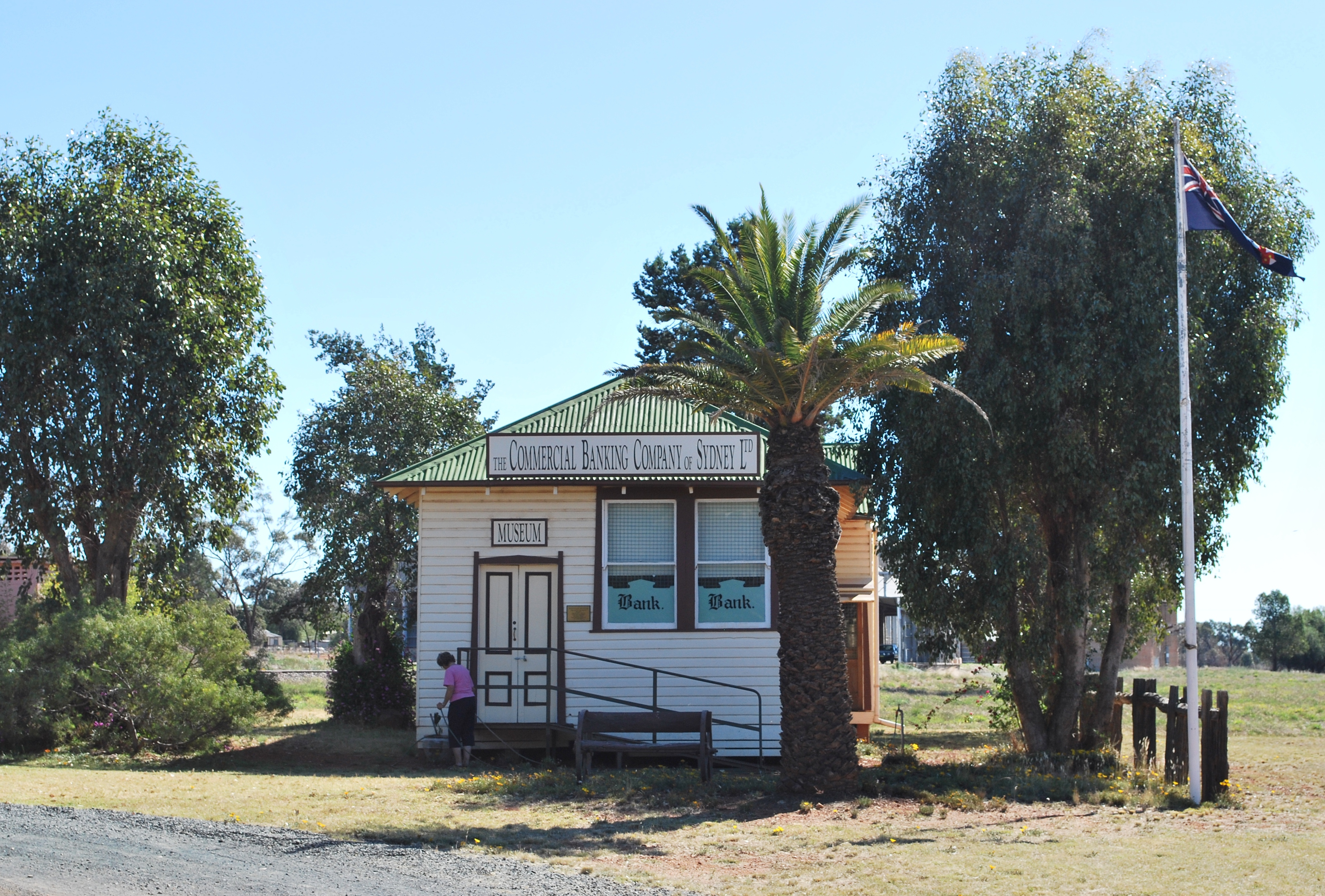
Museum

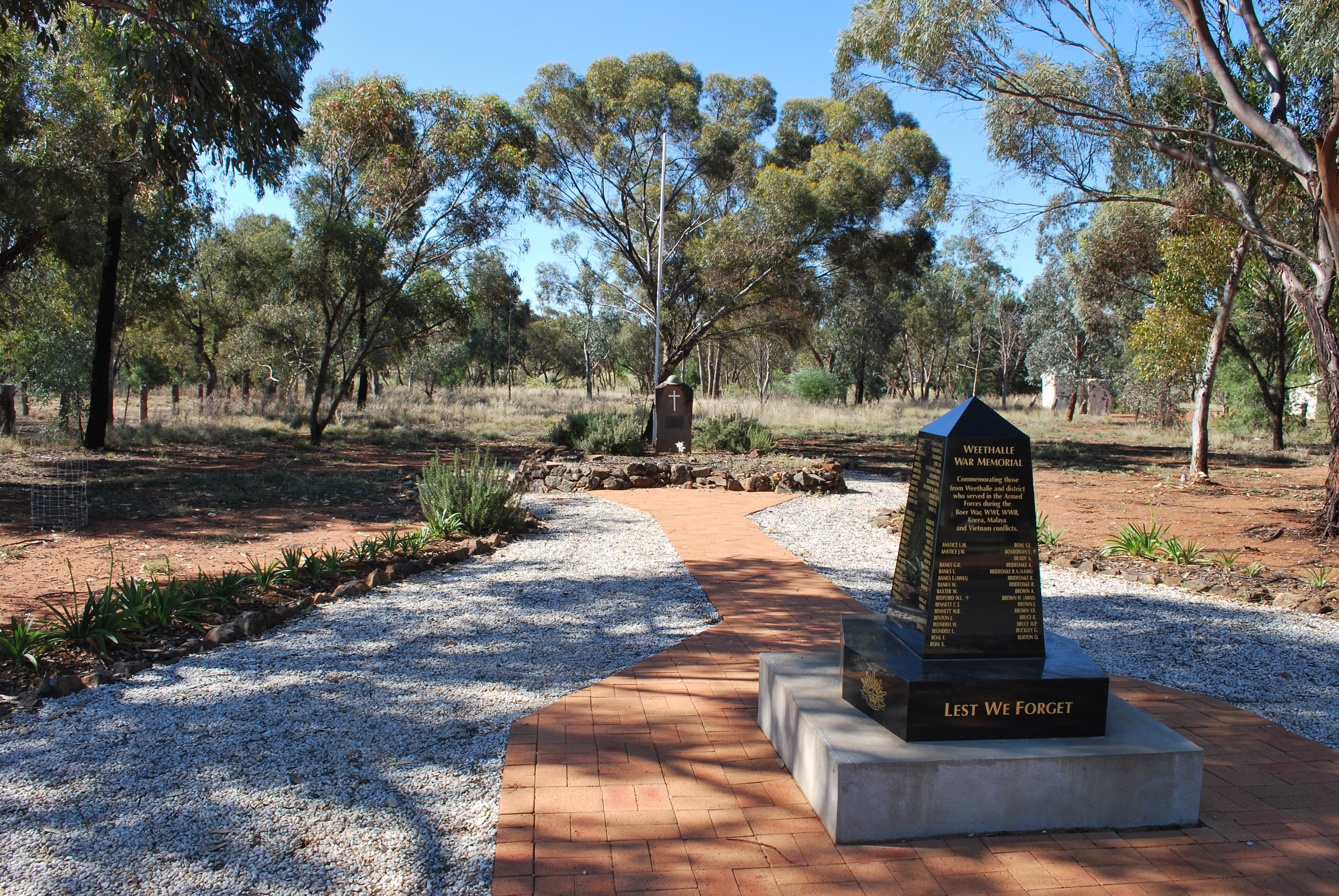
War memorial

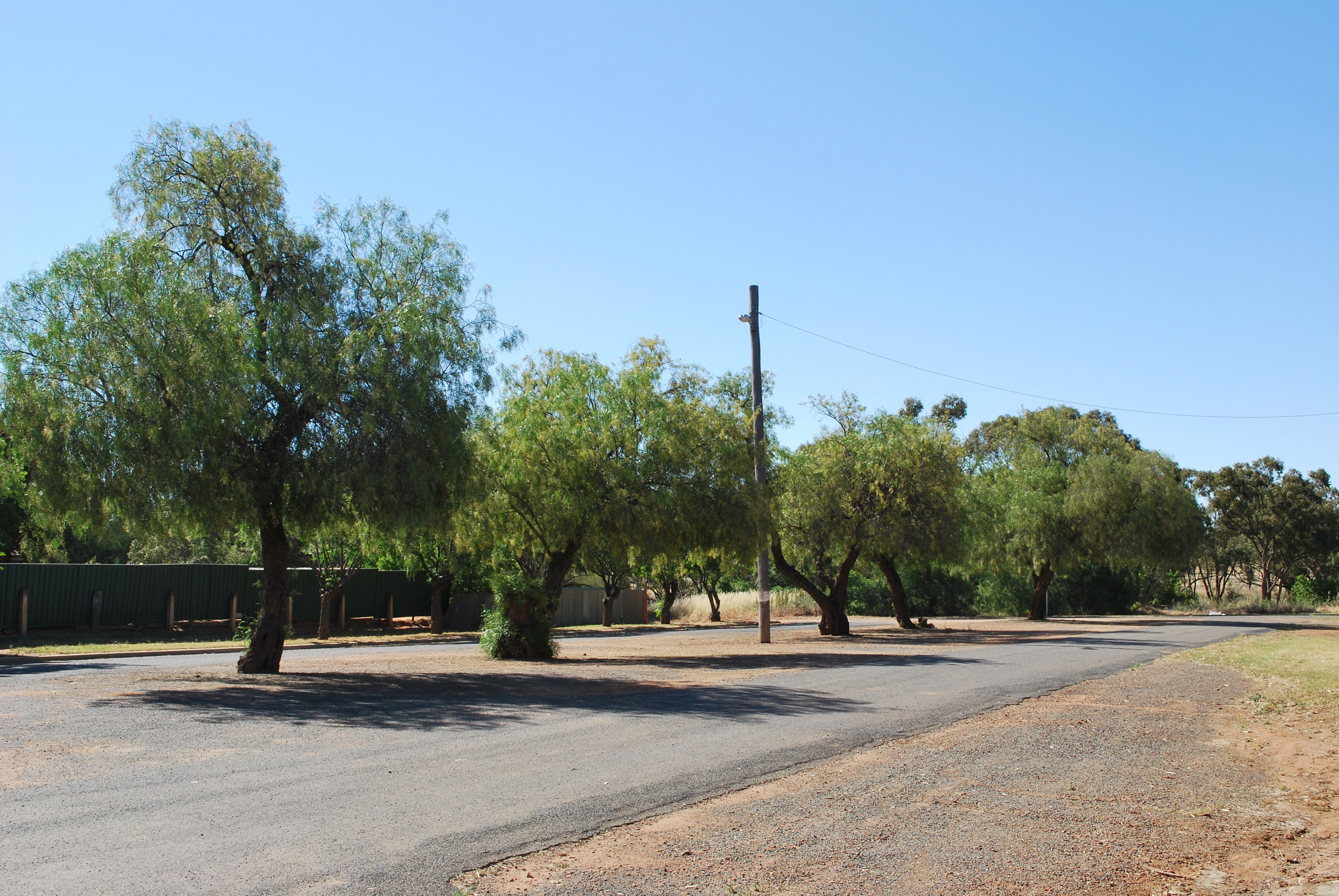
Weethalle Wee St

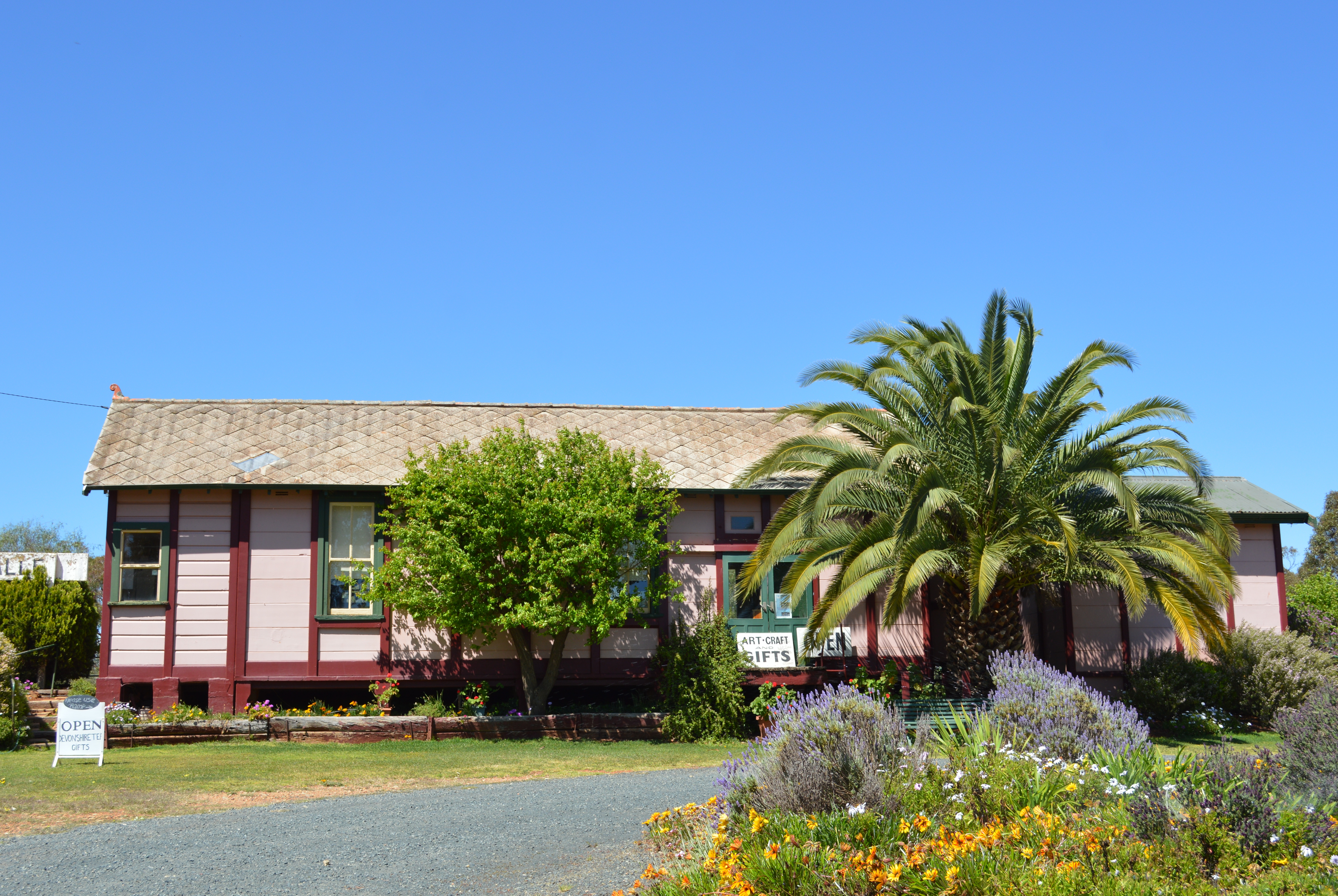
Railway Station

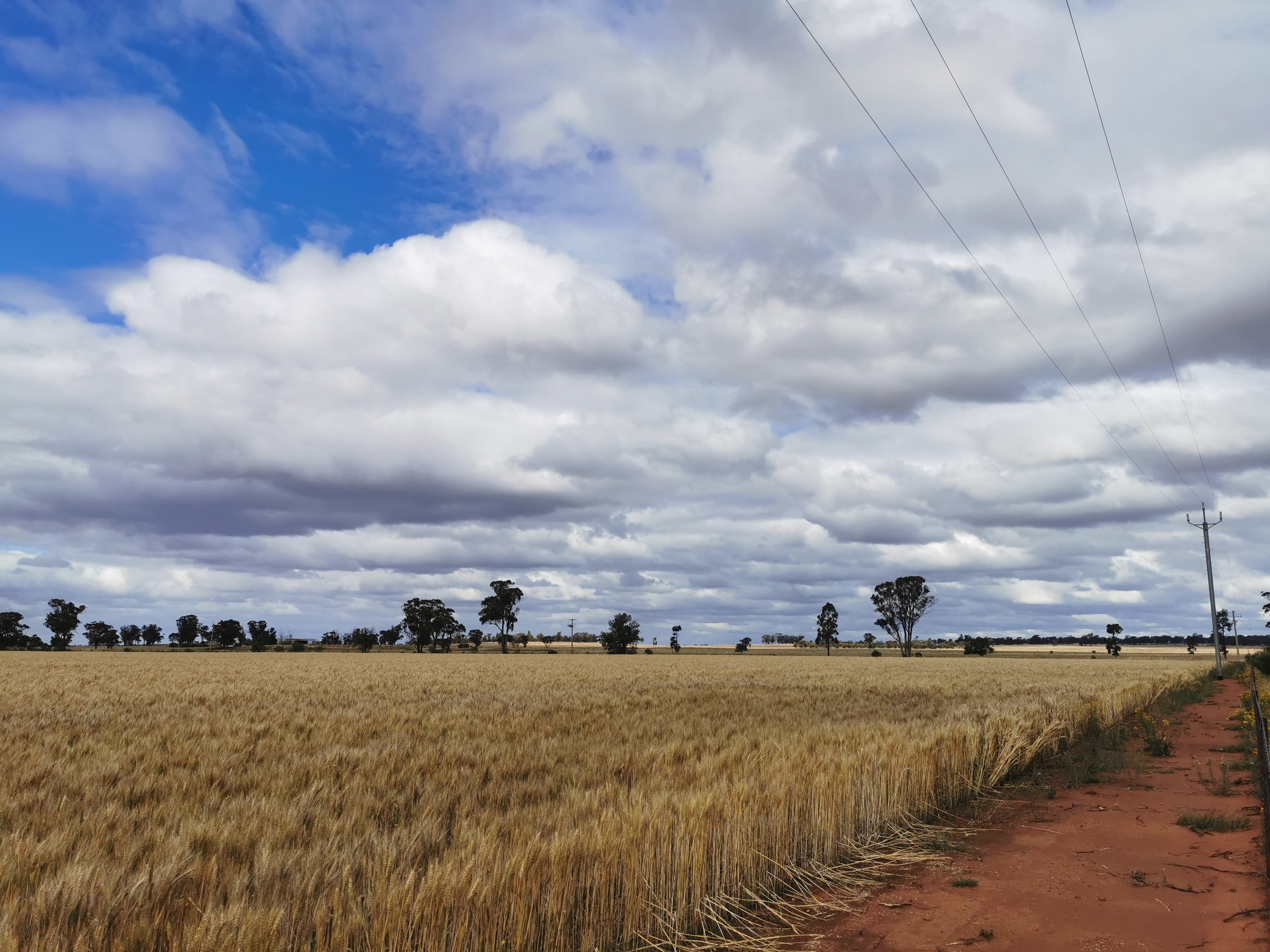
Wheatfield near Weethalle
